= St Ann's Well railway station =

Disused railway station in Nottinghamshire, England

Coordinates: 52.9730°N 1.1251°W

St Ann's Well
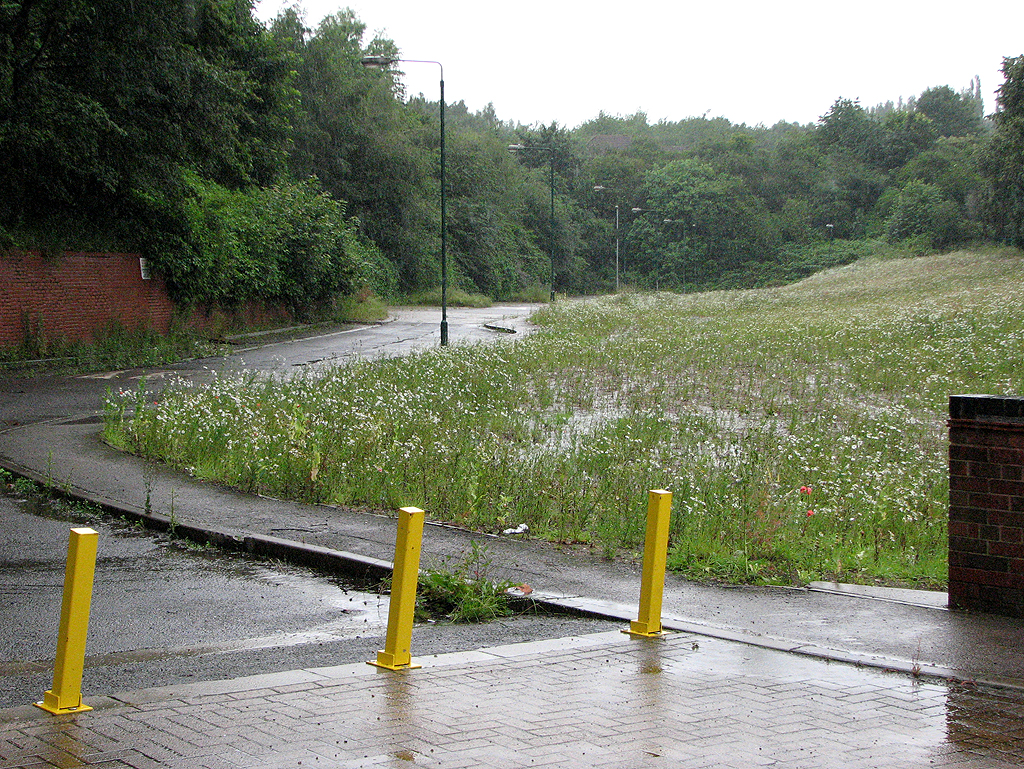
- Site of St Ann's Well station

General information
- Location: St Ann's, Nottingham, Nottinghamshire; England
- Platforms: 2

Other information
- Status: Disused

History
- Original company: Great Northern Railway
- Pre-grouping: Great Northern Railway
- Post-grouping: London and North Eastern Railway

Key dates
- 1889: Opened
- 1916: Closed to passengers
- 1951: Line closed
Location

St Ann's Well railway station was a station serving the suburb of St Ann's in Nottingham, Nottinghamshire. It was located on the Great Northern Railway Nottingham Suburban Railway. The station was opened in 1889, only to be closed to regular passenger traffic on 1 July 1916 and completely to through traffic in 1951

Former Services

Preceding station	Disused railways	Following station
Thorneywood	Great Northern Railway; Nottingham Suburban Railway	Sherwood

== See also ==
- Sherwood railway station
- Thorneywood railway station
- Nottingham's Tunnels
