= Nottingham Academy =

Coeducational multi-campus academy in Nottingham

Nottingham Academy Woodford
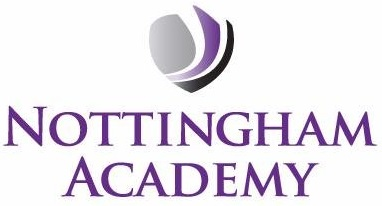
- Nottingham; England

Information
- Type: Comprehensive school All-through Academy
- Motto: Be Inspired
- Established: 2009
- Founders: Merged
- Local authority: City of Nottingham
- Trust: Greenwood Academies Trust
- Department for Education URN: 135881 Tables
- Ofsted: Reports
- Lead Head Principal: Mr M Afaq
- Gender: Mixed
- Age range: 3–19
- Enrolment: 2,928
- Capacity: 3,570
- Campuses: Greenwood 1; Greenwood 2; Wells Academy
- Colours: Purple and Black
- Accreditation: DrugAware
- Website: www.nottinghamacademy.org

Nottingham Academy is an academy school located in Nottingham, England. It is an all-through 3-19 school. The school is made up from two (formerly three) predecessor schools, Greenwood Dale 11-19, The Jesse Boot Primary School 3–11, and formerly Elliott Durham 11–16.

The Nottingham Academy was founded in 2009 but formally opened during the year of 2011 when Greenwood Campus had completed construction, becoming once the 'largest school in Europe', serving up to 3,780 pupils ages 3–19. It is administered by a principal, and each site has a Head of School. The academy is sponsored by the Greenwood Academies Trust (GAT).

In September 2020, The Nottingham Academy, Greenwood Campus and Ransom Campus separated and become two individual schools under the Greenwood Academies Trust. The Greenwood Campus remained called The Nottingham Academy while the Ransom Campus became The Wells Academy.

== History ==
The Nottingham Academy is the result of the combination of the former Elliott Durham School, which was labelled the third worst performing school in the country in 2007, the Greenwood Dale School, which had been highlighted by Ofsted in 2009 as one of 12 outstanding schools serving disadvantaged communities. Also included was the Jesse Boot School. The Academy was formed in 2009 as city academy.

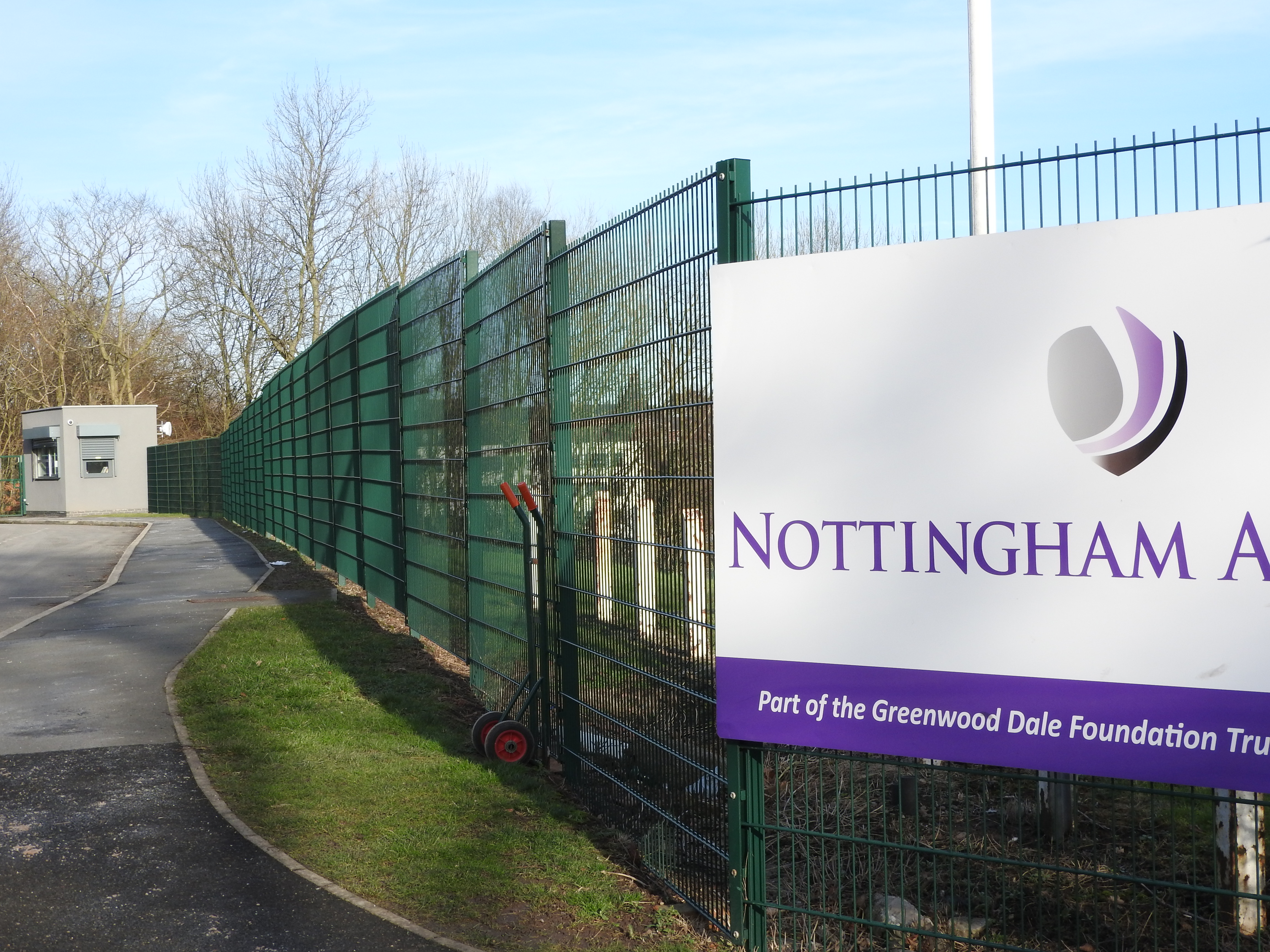
Nottingham Academy, Wells Academy Campus

Greenwood Dale school, in Sneinton was a maintained comprehensive that was popular with parents and was full to capacity and too full to take extra pupils, and the site was impossible to expand. It had previously been Greenwood Bilateral School, changing from being a bilateral, with its grammar stream, to a comprehensive school in 1972. It had not lost its kudos. It had failed some key Ofsted tests in 1992 but had raised these indicator results from 12% five A* to C, not including maths and English, in 1992, to 97% overall pass rate in 2007 and it had a 53% pass rate when including maths and English.

Elliott Durham, was a deeply unpopular comprehensive which served one of Nottingham's poorest neighbourhoods, St Ann's. It had space for 1,350 pupils, but in 2007 had only 350. Families would rather bus their children out of the city than send them to Elliott Durham. Academically it had just 21% A* to C grades at GCSE in 2007, including maths and English, though that was a rise on the 7% two years previously; considerably down on the 47.6% average for secondary schools in England. It was a classified as a "national challenge" school, ones where fewer than 30% of pupils achieve five GCSE passes including in maths and English, it had been told to rapidly improve or close down.

Jesse Boot, a primary school in Bakersfield down the road, urgently needed to replace its 1930s classrooms and do something about its falling rolls. It had 500 pupils on roll, but capacity for 630.

=== Opening of the Nottingham Academy ===
Europe's biggest school catering for 3,600 pupils opened to the public on 7 September 2009. The academy merged three schools. The academy had 200 teachers and more than 100 administrators and assistants on roll during its opening.

The Nottingham Academy was one of the Government's most costly schools building projects. It was among many 'all through' schools providing education for children aged 3 to 19.

Nottingham Academy was one of the first of its kind with a target to build more premium academies across the country.

Today Nottingham Academy is among 31 other academies just like it, all sponsored to the Greenwood Academy Trust.

Michael Gove, former Secretary of State for Education, officially opened the new Greenwood Campus 1 building at Nottingham Academy on 22 September 2011.

== Greenwood Campus ==
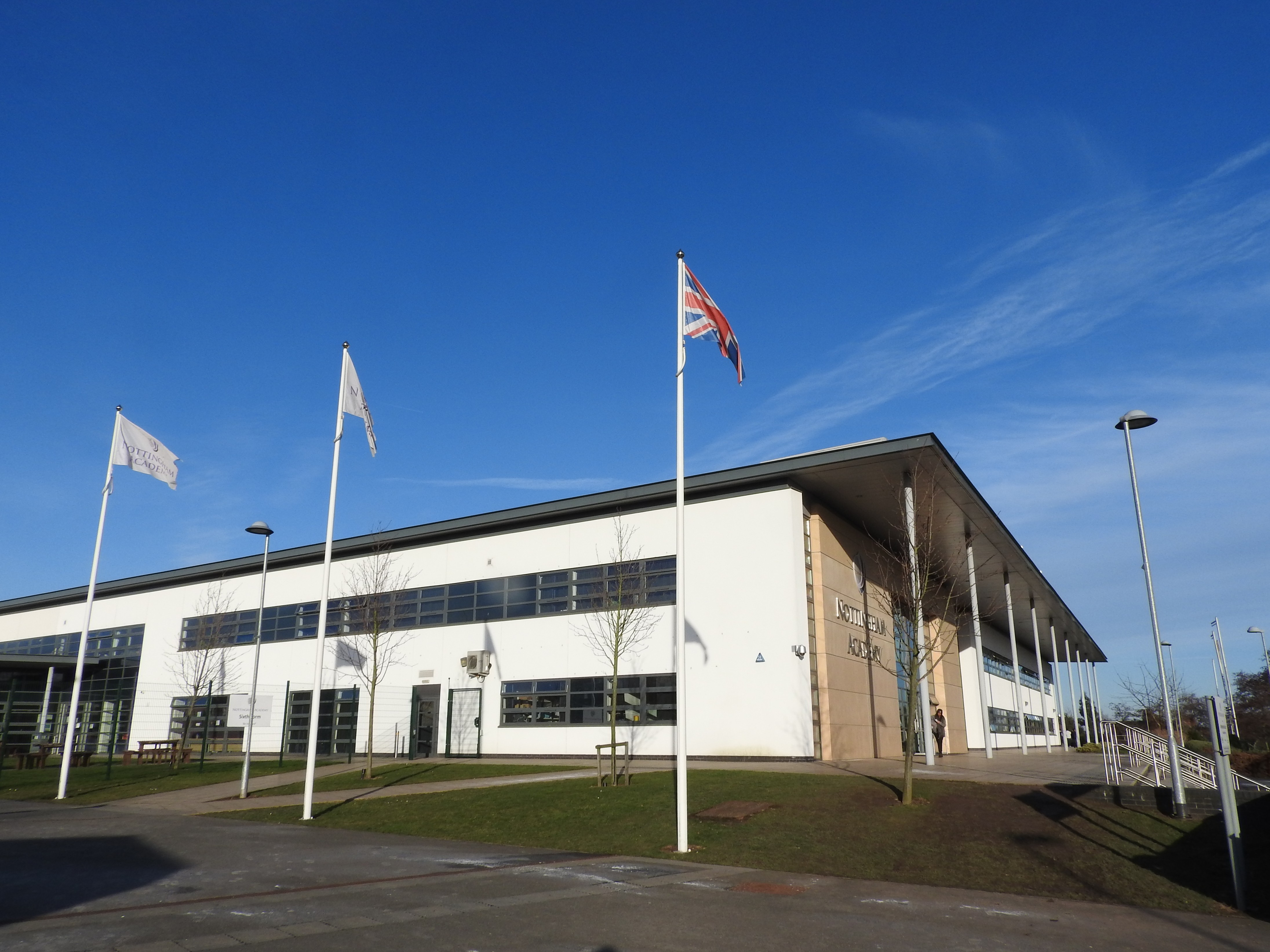
The Greenwood Site, 2018

The Nottingham Academy, Greenwood Campus is set on the former Jesse Boot School and the Greenwood Dale School, creating Greenwood Campus 1 & 2. The Greenwood Campus 1 (GC1) holds the Primary Academy (Nursery - Year 3), the Secondary Academy (Year 9-11) and the Sixth Form Centre (Year 12-13)

The Greenwood Campus 2 (GC2) currently holds the Primary Academy (Year 4-6) and the Secondary Academy (Year 7-8). The Greenwood Campus 1 & 2 serves the Sneinton and Bakersfield areas.

=== The Jesse Boot School, Hereford Road ===
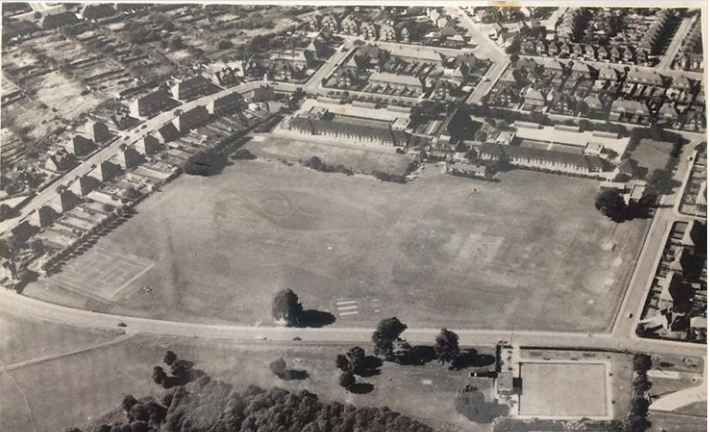
Jesse Boot School

The Jesse Boot Infant and Juniors School was a primary school located on Hereford Road, Bakersfield, Nottingham (Now, Nottingham Academy, Greenwood Campus 1). It provided education for students aged 3–11. The Jesse Boot School was permanently closed in September 2009. Miss L Valentine was the last headmaster at the school, she retired in 2017.

==== Jesse Boot, 1st Baron Trent ====
Jesse Boot's father (John Boot) founded the Boots Company. Jesse Boot transformed the Boots company into a national retailer. The company branded itself 'chemists to the nation' before Jesse sold his controlling interest to American investors in 1920. Jesse donated land to the University of Nottingham. He was knighted in 1909, and died in Jersey on 13 June 1931.

The Jesse Boot School was built as a memorial for Jesse Boot, the school was opened in 1935 following his death. His son, John Boot officially opened the school on 17 July 1936, he said: "There was no memorial that my father would have appreciated more than to have a school like this named after him." The Jesse Boot School opened with two headmasters, Mr. A.J Bates, and E.A Worsdall.

In September 2019, Greenwood Campus and Greenwood Campus 2 could re-open as 'Colwick Park Academy' in efforts to raise the standards, control and overall education at the Nottingham Academy set out by Greenwood Academies' Proposal.

=== Elliot Durham ===
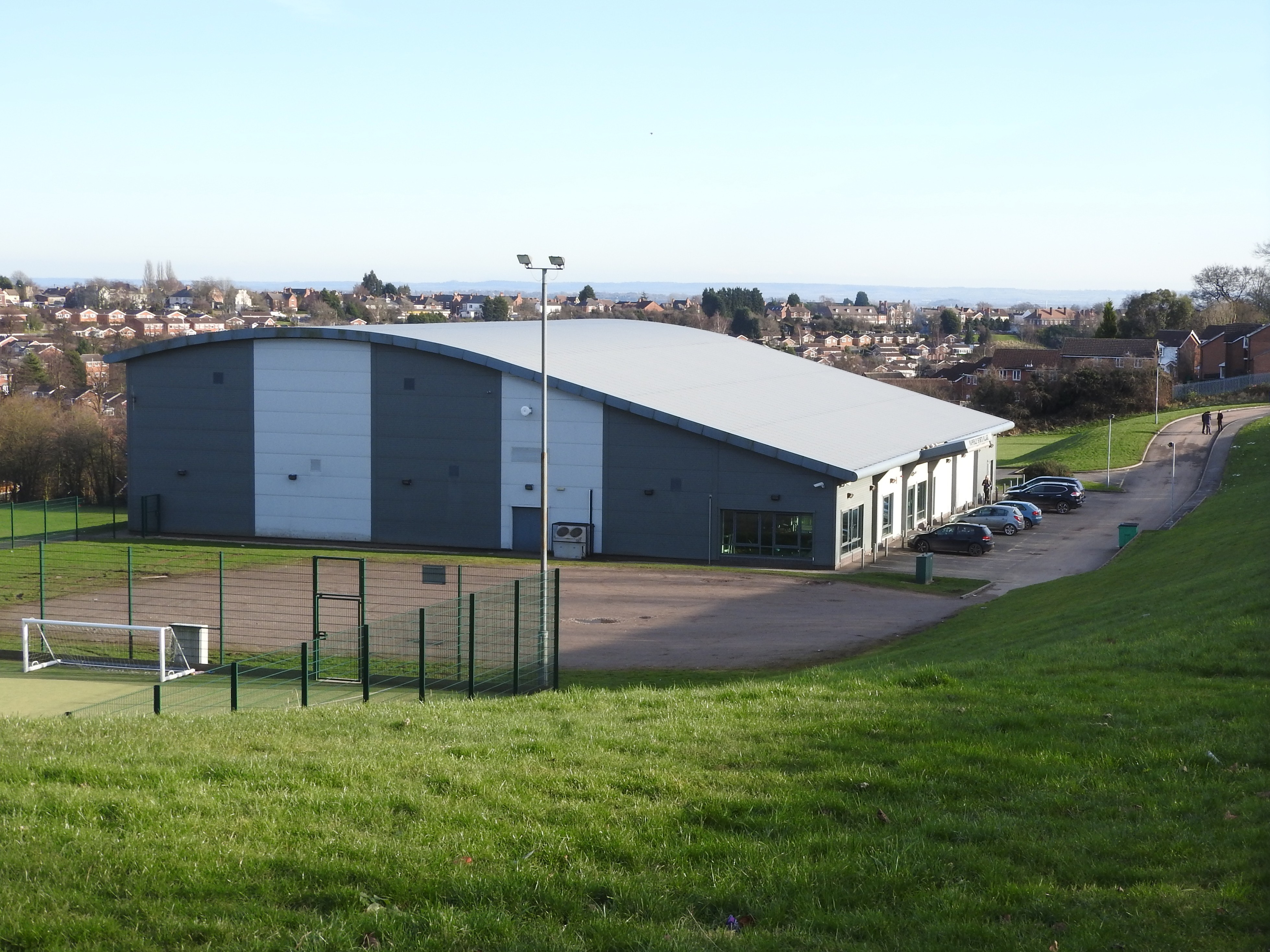
The Sports Hall in 2018

Elliot Durham opened in 1966. Schoolsnet in 2003 described it as an 11 to 16 co-educational school, which is housed in excellent purpose-built accommodation on a very attractive site. It emphasises the sports facilities, which include a sports hall with a full size of basketball court, four badminton courts and areas for gymnastics, indoor football, netball and hockey, and a small carpeted hall for dance and aerobics. Outside there are four tennis courts, two floodlit astro-turf fields, extensive playing fields and pool. The school was not popular with parents and though having a capacity of 1350, it had only 353 students on roll.

== Proposal to de-merge ==
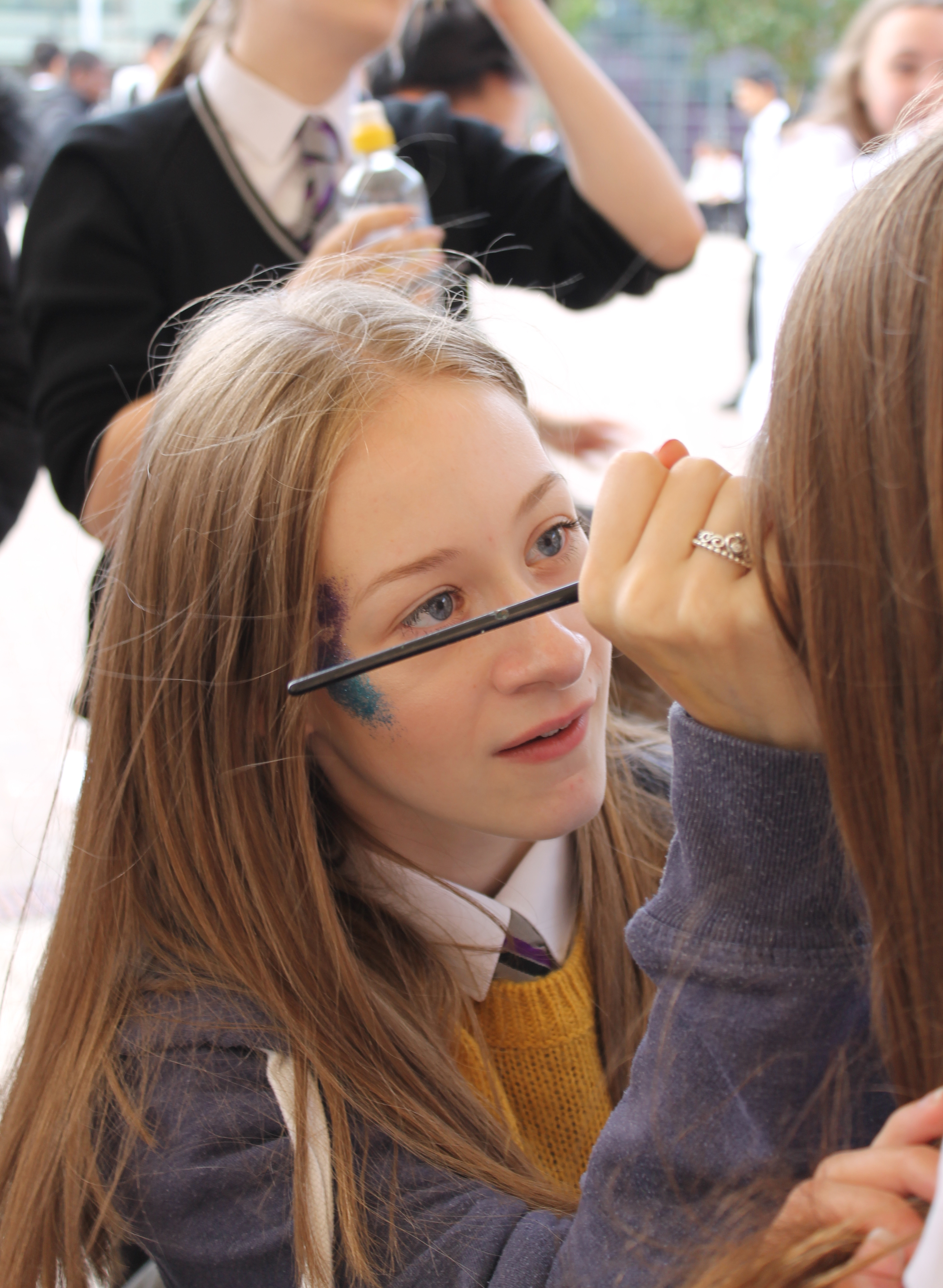
Nottingham Academy student engaged in face painting at Nottingham Academy Pride 2019

In November 2018, Greenwood Academies, sponsor of Nottingham Academy, announced their plans to separate the Greenwood Campus and Ransom Campus.

The original proposal saw changes to the names of both Ransom Campus and Greenwood Campus. Greenwood Campus would be renamed 'Colwick Park Academy' and Ransom Campus would be renamed as 'Mapperley Park Academy'. The newly formed academy would receive a new principal and a personalised curriculum.

After the consultation in December 2018, a series of changes were made to the proposal. Under the new proposal, the Ransom Road Campus would be renamed to 'The Wells Academy' in September 2020, but until 2020 it would be referred to as 'Nottingham Academy - Wells Academy Campus'.

Other changes consisted of an extended day for the Wells Academy Campus for additional pastoral support, academic revision and an improvement upon reading and new uniform policies which included the removal of the skirt for female students and the proposal to include a line of blazers. However, after complaints from parents, the decision to remove skirts from the uniform has been removed.

Under the new proposal, Greenwood Campus would remain the same, the earlier proposed 'Colwick Park Academy' rename would no longer come into effect and the campus would stay as 'Nottingham Academy, Greenwood Campus 1&2'.

The proposal took complete effect after September 2020, with the Ransom Road campus becoming The Wells Academy.

== Governance ==
The Nottingham Academy is part of the Greenwood Academies Trust and is controlled by the trustees. There is no local governing body, just an advisory board. Each region has a liaising advisor. Individual schools do not have local governing bodies, but advisory panels.

== School structure ==
A central team from the trust provides support services for finance, ICT, procurement, human resources, catering, data, curriculum development, staff development, health and safety. The academy has control of 94.5% of the budget; the central team controls the other 5.5%.

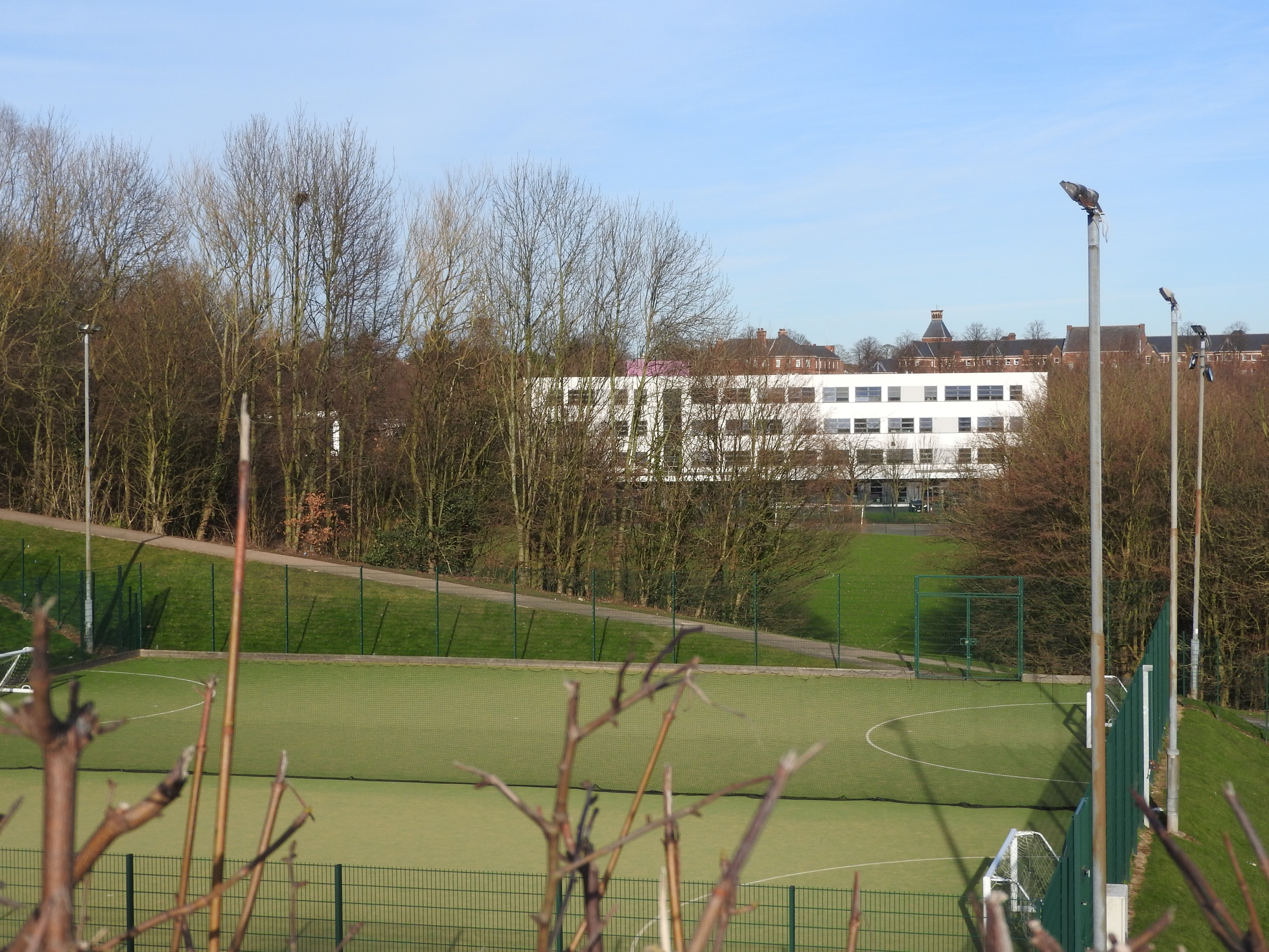
The Wells Campus, formally Ransom Campus

There are three sites representing the three former schools. They are grouped into two campuses.

The Greenwood Campus serves the Sneinton and Bakersfield areas and the Wells Academy Campus serves the Mapperley and St Anns areas. On the Greenwood Campus, the Greenwood Road site includes pupils from primary year groups from Nursery through to year 3 and secondary students in year groups 9 through to Post 16. The Sneinton Boulevard site includes primary year groups year 4 to year 6 and secondary year groups 7 and 8, like a traditional middle school.

Cohort	Greenwood Campus	Ransom Road Campus
Year 7	246	138
Year 8	233	154
Year 9	244	138
Year 10	233	130
Year 11	230	108
Year 12	76	--
Year 13/14	99	--

=== Buildings ===
The three sites were given a £55 million rebuild. The architects were Franklin Ellis Architects and the scheme was managed by Carillon.

The Wells Academy buildings have been refurbished and subjected to new cladding. They have been linked at the upper floor level.

Sneinton Boulevard's (Greenwood Site 2) annex building was demolished during the academic year of 2016/2017 making way for a new primary building that was finished in 2017.

== Pupil initiatives ==
=== Nottingham Academy Pride 2018 ===
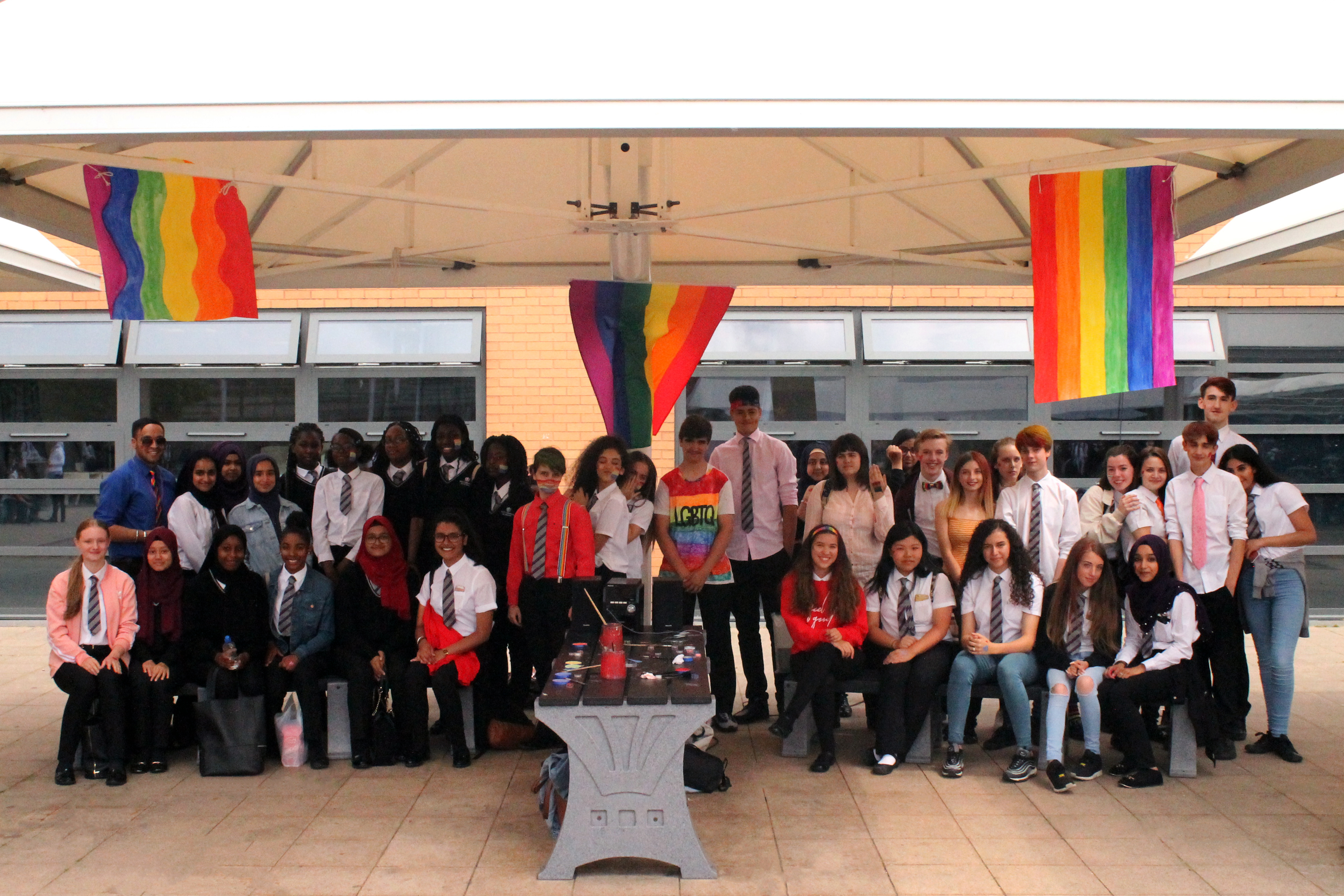
Mr S Gidda and his pupils

In early 2018, a Nottingham Academy year ten pupil presented the idea to run a series of educational events surrounded equality, diversity and the LGBTQ community to 10SGI tutor at Greenwood Campus. As a result to the proposal, development was made on the student's idea and from 6 to 13 July 2018 the tutorial group, 10SGI led the Nottingham Academy Pride and LGBTQ+ Awareness Week campaign.

The tutor group, 10SGI presented activities that ran throughout the week. These activities included educational lessons on equality, diversity and LGBTQ topics, pride-themed fundraisers and educational assemblies.

The educational lessons were presented to tutors across Greenwood Campus that aimed to look at different subjects. Topics included 'The Pride Movement', 'The Meaning Behind LGBTQ+', 'Difference Between Sex & Gender' and others. These lessons were backed by physical activities which included worksheets and social conversations with other pupils. These activities were themed and included 'How masculine and feminine are you?' and 'What do the colours of the flag represent?'.

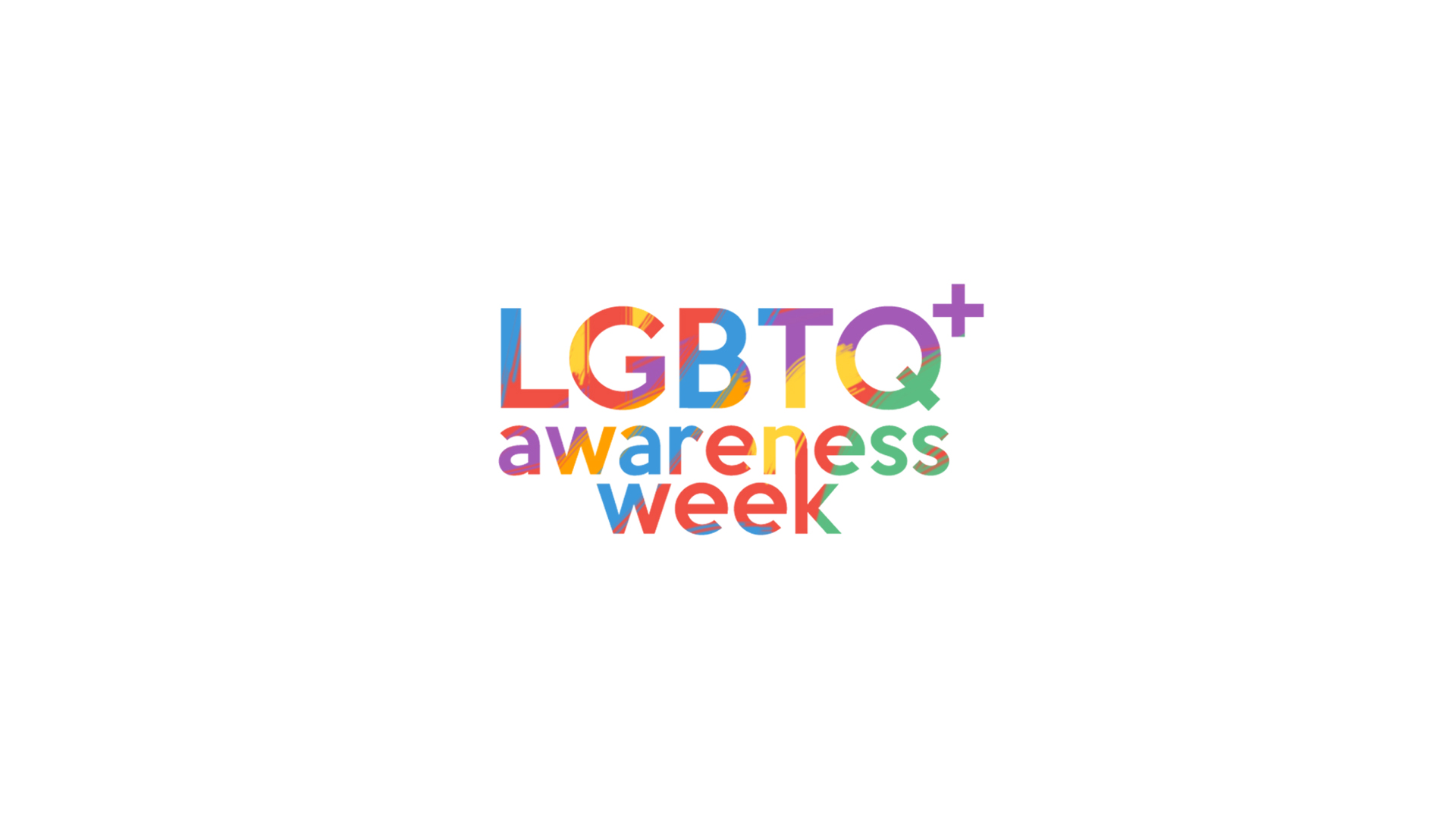

The Nottingham Academy tutor group, 10SGI invited a trans woman into the campus to speak to the year ten group of pupils within an assembly about transness. This assembly included her life, the science behind transness and statistics with advice on bullying and abuse related issues.

Throughout the week of Nottingham Academy Pride 2018, 10SGI ran a series of pride-themed fundraisers including cake sales, ice pole sales, non-uniform and face painting, raising £110 for Nottinghamshire Pride.

The non-uniform and face-painting or 'celebration' events allowed for students to come together and embrace their differences despite their race, religion, colour, creed or sexual orientation while showing support for those within the LGBTQ+ community and those affected by anti-LGBTQ abuse.

=== Nottingham Academy Pride 2019 ===
In 2019, a Nottingham Academy student proposed to run a second year of the Nottingham Academy Pride event for pupils across Greenwood Campus. The proposal saw developments from the 2018 Pride event with students from all secondary year groups participating in lessons and celebrations along with new lesson topics and fundraisers.

From 8 to 12 July 2019 Nottingham Academy, Greenwood Campus students participated within the second year of the school's pride, equality and diversity events with a series of new educational lessons and pride-themed fundraisers. The educational lessons saw development from previous years, with topics such as 'The Pride Movement', 'LGBTQ Abuse and Bullying' from 2018 with added topics such as 'Section 28', 'LGBTQ+ Rights' and more. These educational lessons were backed with physical activities such as class discussions and worksheets, similar to the 2018 event.

Nottingham Academy students from all secondary year groups across Greenwood Campus participated within pride-themed fundraisers and celebrations. These fundraisers included colourful cake, biscuit and ice pole sales along with pride badges with all proceeds going to Stonewall UK, an LGBTQ+ charity.

Nottingham Academy Pride 2019 logo, created by Nottingham Academy Pupil

To end off the pride and LGBTQ+ Awareness and Acceptance events pupils from all secondary year groups stood together, supporting equality and diversity through a series of celebrations including face painting, colourful non-uniforms and more. Students embraced their differences regardless of race, religion, colour, creed, or sexual orientation.

The Nottingham Academy Pride event was promoted on Twitter by Nottingham Academy and Greenwood Academies Trust using the hashtag '#StandingTogetherForPride'

The event, "Nottingham Academy Pride is part of the 'Standing Together Programme', created by Nathaniel McLaughlin, Tamina Ikram and inspired by Mr S Gidda."
