= Sherwood railway station =

Disused railway station in Nottinghamshire, England

Coordinates: 52.9819°N 1.1368°W

Sherwood
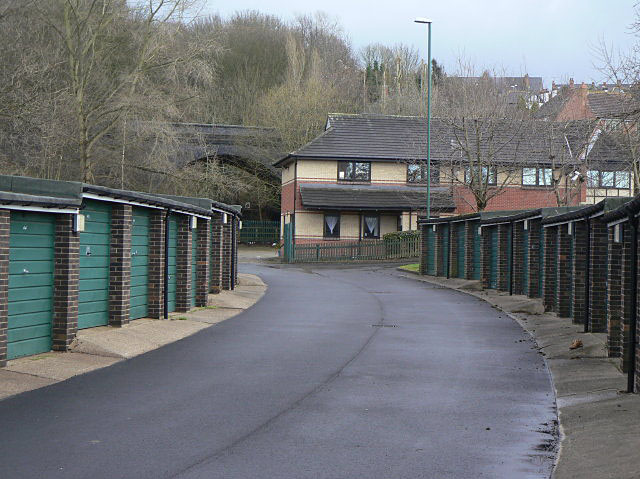
- Site of Sherwood station

General information
- Location: Sherwood, Nottingham, Nottinghamshire; England
- Platforms: 2

Other information
- Status: Disused

History
- Original company: Great Northern Railway
- Pre-grouping: Great Northern Railway
- Post-grouping: London and North Eastern Railway

Key dates
- 1889: Opened
- 1916: Closed to passengers
- 1951: Line closed
Location

Sherwood railway station was a station on the former Great Northern Railway Nottingham Suburban railway in Nottingham. The station lies within Woodthorpe Grange Park in Woodthorpe.

The NSR was built mainly for the brickworks of Mapperley and Thornywood, however, there were passenger services to Daybrook and Sherwood Station. In 1905, Parry sold the estate to Godfrey Small a Nottingham City Councillor. Meanwhile, the railway was struggling with the opening of the electric tram from Nottingham City Centre to Sherwood. In 1916 the regular passenger service was withdrawn and Sherwood Station closed.

Woodthorpe Grange Park opened to the public in 1922. On 10 July 1928 King George V and Queen Mary visited the park and 17,000 school children travelled to the event on the NSR to Sherwood Station (which had been re-opened for the event). An enthusiasts special ran on 16 June 1951 but goods train finished on 1 August 1951 when the line was abandoned. The track was lifted in 1954.

Preceding station	Disused railways	Following station
St Ann's Well	Great Northern Railway; Nottingham Suburban Railway	Daybrook

== See also ==
- St Ann's Well railway station
- Thorney Wood railway station
- Nottingham's Tunnels
