= Thorneywood railway station =

Disused railway station in Nottinghamshire, England

Coordinates: 52.9623°N 1.1211°W

Thorneywood
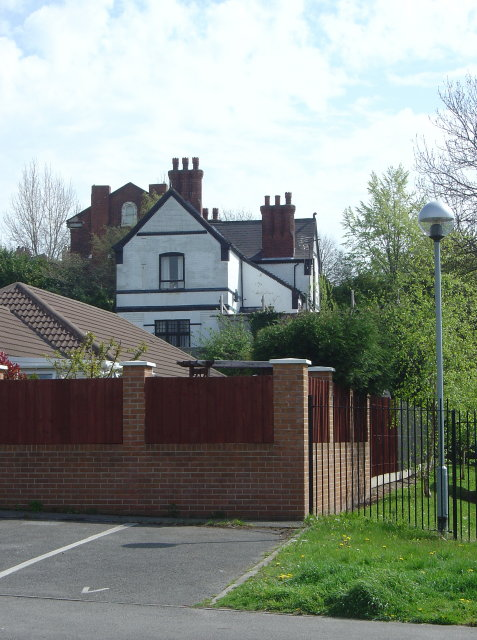
- Thorneywood Station

General information
- Location: Thorneywood, Nottingham, Nottinghamshire; England
- Platforms: 2

Other information
- Status: Disused

History
- Original company: Great Northern Railway
- Pre-grouping: Great Northern Railway
- Post-grouping: London and North Eastern Railway

Key dates
- 1889: Opened
- 1916: Closed to passengers
- 1951: Line closed
Location

Thorneywood railway station was a station on the former Great Northern Railway Nottingham Suburban railway in Thorneywood, Nottingham, England. It opened in 1889, regular passenger services ceased in 1916. Woodthorpe Grange Park opened to the public in 1922. On 10 July 1928 King George V and Queen Mary visited the park and 17,000 school children travelled to the event on the NSR to Sherwood and Thorneywood Stations (which had been re-opened for the event). An enthusiasts special ran on 16 June 1951 but goods train finished on 1 August 1951 when the line was abandoned. and the track was lifted in 1954.

Former Services

Preceding station	Disused railways	Following station
Nottingham London Road High Level	Great Northern Railway; Nottingham Suburban Railway	St Ann's Well

== See also ==
- Sherwood railway station
- St Ann's Well railway station
- Nottingham's Tunnels
