= Tunnels of Nottingham =

Transportation tunnels in Nottingham, UK

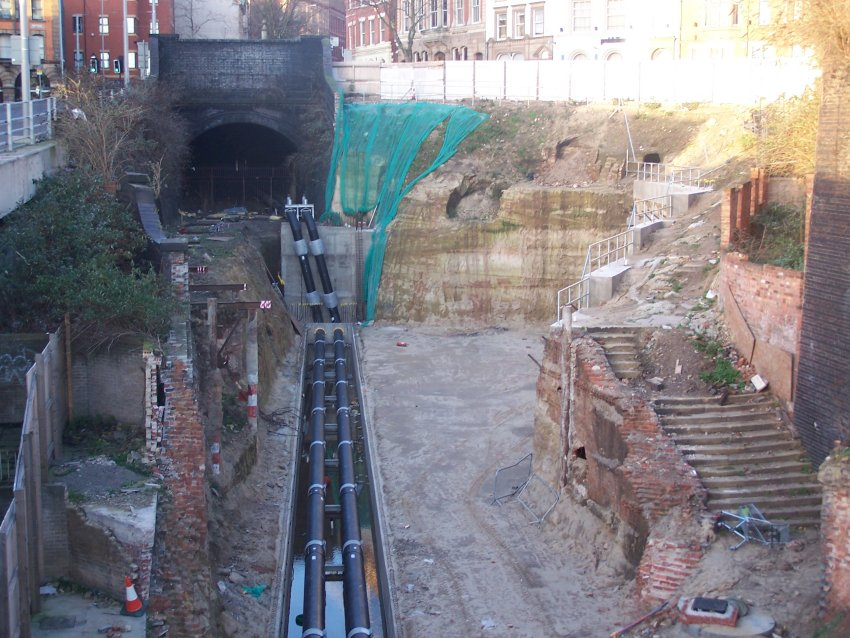
Weekday Cross Tunnel south portal. The cutting has been deepened and the heating pipes lowered to accommodate the CCAN in 2007

Many of the tunnels of Nottingham were built by three railway companies in and around Nottingham, England because their lines crossed substantial hills. The companies were the Great Northern Railway (GNR), the Great Central Railway (GCR), and the Nottingham Suburban Railway.

The LNWR built a station in Nottingham on Manvers Street with its own lines and sidings running off the GNR; whilst it had no tunnel on its short route, it did have a large underground storage depot under the station site, and this is still there. The Park Tunnel was built for more fanciful reasons. Nottingham is home to many underground structures but only those built for transport are mentioned here.

== Great Central Railway ==
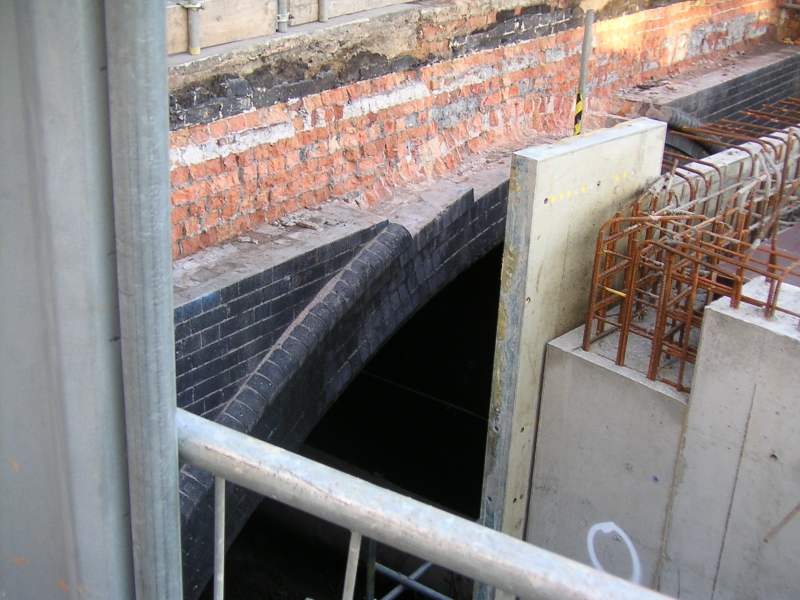
Weekday Cross Tunnel south portal November 2007. Last view of the tunnel mouth before it is covered up by the CCAN.

- Mansfield Road Tunnel (south portal: 52.958346°N 1.147664°W, north portal: 52.968751°N 1.154337°W) is a 1,189-yard tunnel with its north portal in a railway cutting (now filled in) which housed Carrington railway station (closed in 1928) and continued south towards central Nottingham. Its south portal is at the north end of the extensive cutting which currently accommodates the Victoria Shopping Centre. The tunnel still exists but is not accessible.
- Sherwood Rise Tunnel (south portal: 52.970088°N 1.155496°W, north portal: 52.974721°N 1.160291°W) is a 665-yard tunnel and part of its north portal can still be seen in the partly filled cutting off Haydn Road in Basford and its south portal at the north end of the Carrington Station cutting. The tunnel still exists but is only accessible from the south portal.
- Victoria Street Tunnel (south portal: 52.9513°N 1.1461°W, north portal: 52.955548°N 1.147063°W) also known as Weekday Cross Tunnel currently accommodates steam heating pipes from Nottingham's Cattle Market waste incinerator for the Victoria flats above Victoria Shopping Centre. This tunnel is 19 chains long (418 yards) and was originally built for the Great Central Railway completed in 1897 although the Great Central's Nottingham Victoria Station was not completed until 1900. The Victoria Shopping Centre was built on the site of the demolished Victoria Station. This tunnel runs south from Victoria Shopping Centre to its south portal near to Nottingham's Galleries of Justice at Weekday Cross. The Nottingham Express Transit line proceeds from just south of this portal towards Midland Railway Station on an original GCR viaduct. In 2009. the Centre for Contemporary Art Nottingham (CCAN) was built in the railway cutting in which the south portal resides.

== Great Northern Railway ==
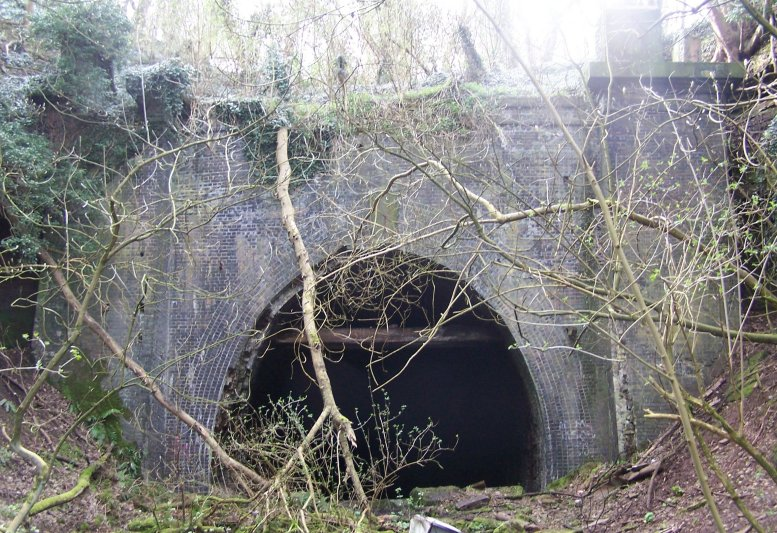
Mapperley Tunnel eastern portal photographed in 2007

- Mapperley Tunnel is a 1,044m, or 1,132-yard-long tunnel, built for the Derbyshire and Staffordshire Extension of the Great Northern Railway. This line ran from Colwick Junction in Nottingham to Egginton Junction in South Derbyshire. The route planned took the line through Mapperley via the Mapperley Tunnel built to avoid attempting to get the railway over the ridge. The tunnel was in use by 1875 but suffered a roof collapse due to mining subsidence on 23 January 1925. A length of roof about 12 yards long collapsed, blocking the line with approximately 150 tons of rubble. Whilst repairs were undertaken traffic was diverted along the Nottingham Suburban Railway. The tunnel was repaired, but the continuing effects of subsidence resulted in speed restrictions in the 1950s and closure on 4 April 1960. The eastern portal is still open and accessible, and the tunnel itself is open to a point just west of the second air shaft (counting from the east). Beyond the second air shaft the tunnel has been filled with earth. The tunnel portal is on private property, and permission should be sought from the owner before entering. A large quantity of rubbish has been thrown down the second air shaft, creating an unstable pile in the tunnel which may collapse in the future, causing injury to anyone present.

== Nottingham Suburban Railway ==
The Nottingham Suburban Railway was completed in 1889; it was only 3.5 miles long but had four tunnels. The line ran between a junction with the Great Northern Railway's Nottingham to Grantham line at Trent Lane in Sneinton, and the Great Northern Railway's Derbyshire and Staffordshire Extension line at Daybrook. It had stations at Sherwood, St Ann's Well and Thorney Wood.

- Ashwell Tunnel is entirely within Woodthorpe Park, Nottingham. The stately home in Woodthorpe Park is called Woodthorpe Grange and was once owned by Edward Parry, the designer and chief engineer of the Nottingham Suburban Railway. Both portals of this 70-yard long tunnel have been covered with earth and the tunnel itself is no longer accessible. At the north portal there is an accommodation bridge allowing Woodthorpe Drive to cross the railway line. The south side of this bridge has been bricked up and a full-sized model of a steam locomotive has been built into the brickwork.
- Sherwood Tunnel is the next tunnel south from Ashwell Tunnel. At the south end of Woodthorpe Park the line passed under the accommodation bridge for Sherwood Vale. This bridge still exists and marks the beginning of a short cutting leading to the north portal of the 442-yard-long Sherwood Tunnel. This portal has been covered with earth. The south portal of this tunnel has also been covered with earth and is just to the west of The Wells Road, Nottingham. To the south of this portal is the St. Ann's Well Station House, which is used as a residence. The station house is on the corner of Dooland Drive and The Wells Road.
- Sneinton Tunnel is 128 yards long and the furthest south of the four tunnels. Its north portal is still visible, but bricked up with access through a locked door. This tunnel was once home to a rifle club. This portal is found at the south end of Porchester Road on the opposite side of Carlton Road, Nottingham.
- Thorneywood Tunnel is a 408-yard-long tunnel south of Sherwood Tunnel with its north portal in a short cutting off Mickleborough Avenue, Nottingham. This portal has also been covered with earth. There was once an embankment to the north of this tunnel leading first over two brick arches and then on to a high girder bridge. The bridge was removed in 1954 and the embankment was removed in 1959. The rubble from the embankment was packed into Thorneywood Tunnel.
- Fifth Tunnel. There was a fifth tunnel on the Nottingham Suburban Railway. This tunnel was on a branch line serving the Nottingham Patent Brickworks. It was 118 yards long and ran from Thorneywood Station under Thorneywood Lane. There was a steep gradient uphill from the station; therefore wagons were hauled through this tunnel to the brickworks by a stationary engine.

== Park Tunnel ==
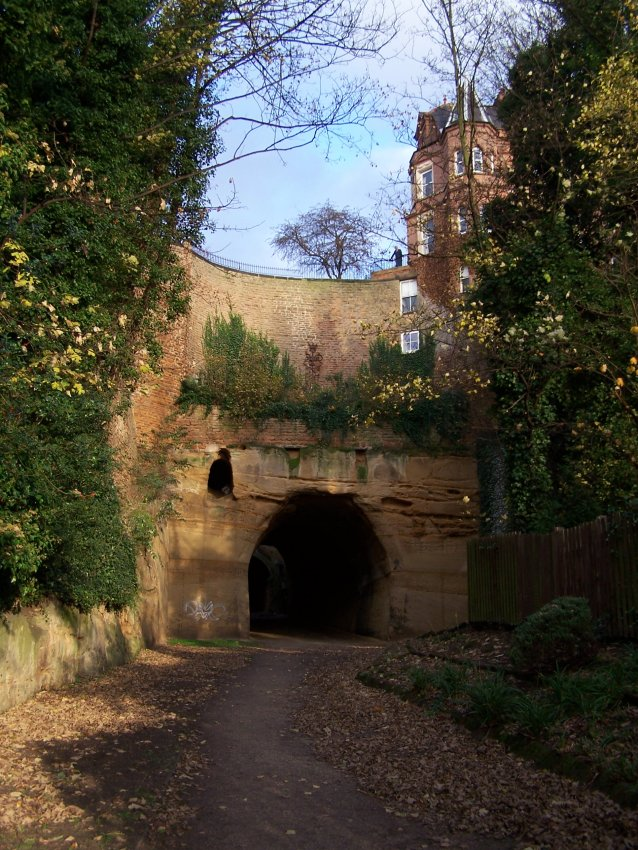
The Park Tunnel photographed from Tunnel Road in the Park, Nottingham in 2006

The Park Tunnel was built in 1855 to allow horsedrawn carriages access to The Park Estate from Derby Road in Nottingham. This area was formerly a private hunting park for the Duke of Newcastle, who was also the owner of Nottingham Castle Mansion. The Fifth Duke of Newcastle retained architect Thomas Chambers (T.C.) Hine (1813–1899) to design and build the Park Tunnel (primarily as the main entrance to the park) and to develop the park as a residential area in central Nottingham for the wealthier members of society. T.C. Hine was also made responsible for the later repair of Nottingham Castle and its conversion into a museum. The tunnel is still in use, providing pedestrian access from Derby Road, Upper College Street and The Ropewalk to the Park.

== See also ==
- Caves of Nottingham
- List of tunnels in the United Kingdom
- St Ann's Well railway station
- Thorney Wood railway station
- Sherwood railway station
