= That Friday Feeling =

That Friday Feeling (TFF)
- Running time: 3 hours
- Country of origin: United Kingdom
- Language: English
- Home station: Mansfield 103.2
- Hosted by: Ian Watkins
- Starring: Ian Watkins
- Produced by: Cameron Ward; Ben Brown
- Original release: September 2009

That Friday Feeling (TFF) was a humorous phone in and music radio programme, broadcast on Mansfield 103.2 which last aired in September 2009. Mansfield 103.2 FM – The Home of Great Music is an Independent Local Radio station in Mansfield, Nottinghamshire.

The show ran for three hours, between 7pm and 10pm, on Fridays. Presented by Ian 'Watko' Watkins, it also featured his producers, Christoff, Cam and Ben. Podcasts of the show were made available by MickYNWA. The show relied on callers and crazy topics. Some of the regulars included the Iman, Crazy Dave, Helen in Sutton, Sue Morgan, Russell from Warsop, David In Mansfield, Mad Pixie, Gary from Kirkby and Phil Mitchell. In one episode Phil Mitchell was almost enticed to buy a fridge by an unknown caller. The show was heavily influenced by radio and TV presenter Iain Lee and on 24 July 2009 he made a guest appearance live in the studio.

The programme started on 22 February 2008 and ran for 5 series until 11 September 2009.

TFF did make a come back for a one off special on 24 March 2017, where Watko put together a treasure hunt and people had to help find golden ducks that were hidden across Mansfield, Ashfield and Bolsover
