= Stonebridge City Farm =

City farm in Nottingham, England

Stonebridge City Farm and Gardens
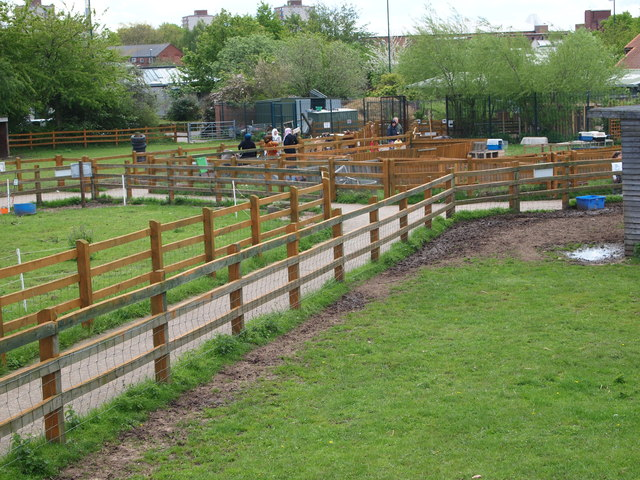
- Interactive map of Stonebridge City Farm and Gardens
- Motto: Helping people connect, contribute and belong through a welcoming community farm
- Location: St Ann's, Nottingham, Nottinghamshire, England
- Nearest city: Nottingham
- Coordinates: 52°57′27″N 1°08′03″W
- Created: 1978
- Open: 10 a.m. to 4 p.m.
- Farm logo
- Website: www.stonebridgecityfarm.com

Stonebridge City Farm is a free-entry community farm and registered charity located in St Ann's, Nottingham, England. Founded in 1978, the farm occupies approximately three acres and attracts around 100,000 visits annually. It combines animals, gardens, volunteering, education, food, and community activity within an urban environment.

The farm supports more than 130 volunteers each week, many of whom have additional support needs, disabilities, or experience social isolation. Alongside its animal and horticultural activities, the farm operates a café, shop, educational facilities, community programmes, and volunteer development opportunities.

Stonebridge City Farm is located within St Ann's, one of Nottingham's most economically disadvantaged communities, and functions as a free community space where people can visit, learn, volunteer, and participate in local activities.

== Community Role ==
Stonebridge City Farm serves as a community hub as well as a visitor attraction. The organisation provides volunteering opportunities, educational visits, work placements, skills development, and community activities for people of all ages. Approximately 1,600 schoolchildren visit the farm annually and volunteers contribute across animal care, horticulture, catering, retail, maintenance, and events.

The farm works with schools, colleges, local authorities, community organisations, and businesses to support learning, inclusion, environmental awareness, and community participation.

== History ==
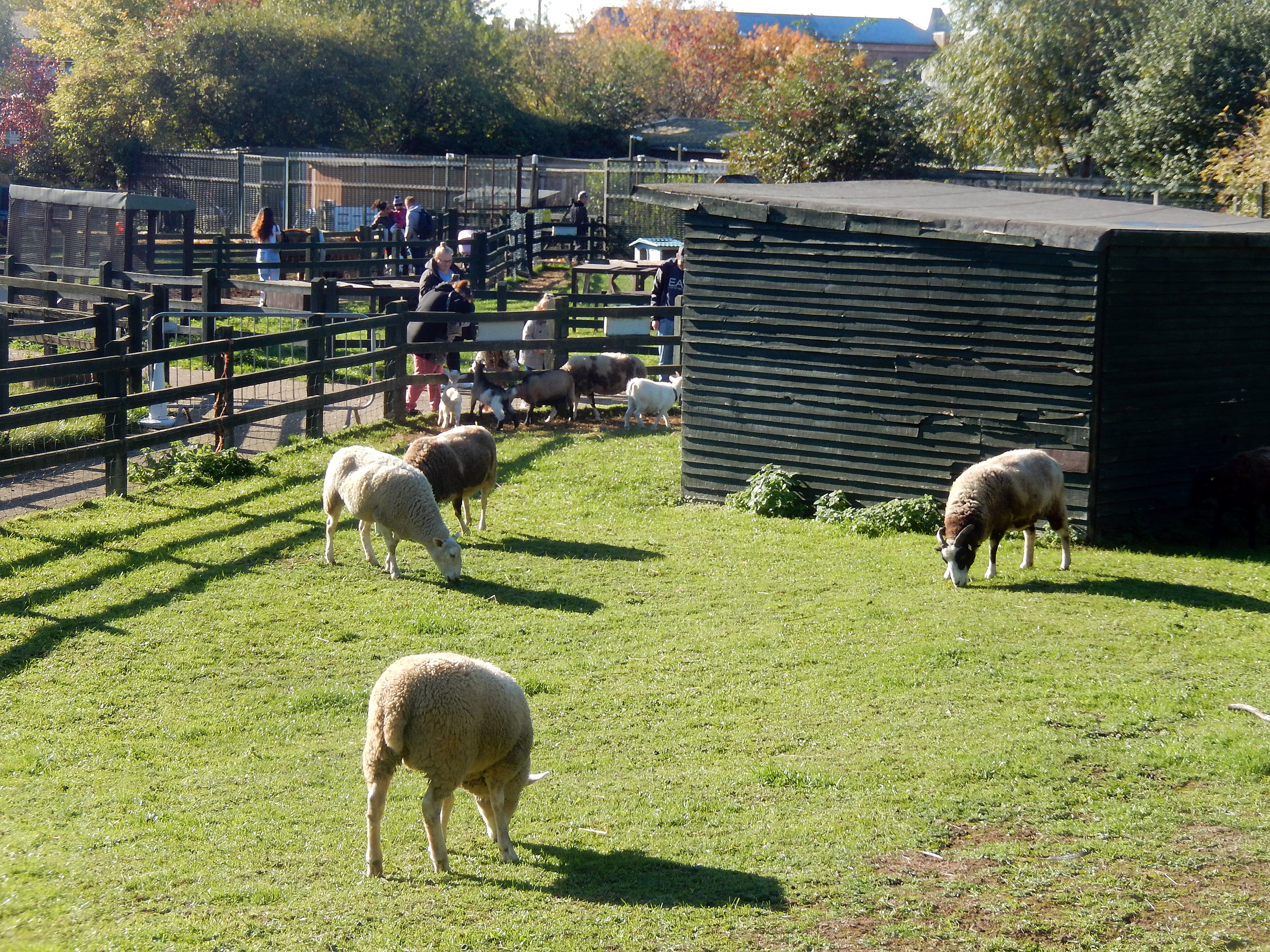
Sheep and goats

Stonebridge City Farm was established in 1978 following a period of significant redevelopment and slum clearance in St Ann's. Land on the site had originally been allocated for a school, but the project was abandoned, leaving the area unused. Inspired by the emerging city farm movement and following discussions between local residents and Nottingham City Council, a lease for the site was agreed on 17 August 1978. The farm's first permanent structure, a barn, was erected in May 1980.

The farm developed through community involvement and volunteer support, becoming a permanent feature of the area. Over time it expanded beyond animal husbandry to include gardens, environmental education, volunteering, work experience opportunities, community events and a public café.

In January 2020, local police donated confiscated gardening equipment from illegal cannabis growing for use on the farm, including fertiliser, tools, and hardware.

== Gardens ==
The farm has a number of areas of cultivation, from orchards and greenhouses to more formal gardens and wild spaces. Fruit and vegetables grown there are used in the on-site café or sold in the shop. Bees are also kept as pollinators and produce several hundred jars of honey.

Stonebridge City Farm and Gardens has won multiple awards, firstly winning the Civic Trust "Green Flag" award (a national standard for parks) in 2010. The gardens won the Royal Horticultural Society in Bloom Bronze and Gold Medals. In 2011, the gardens won the Outstanding award in the East Midlands Bloom Finals.

In 2022, the gardens won a Civic Trust "Green Flag" Community Award.

== Animals ==
Animals are a central part of Stonebridge City Farm's visitor, education, and volunteering activities. The farm keeps a mixture of livestock, poultry, small mammals, and aviary birds. As a working community farm, the animal collection changes over time and includes both resident animals and those that have been rescued or rehomed. The animals are used to support educational visits, volunteer training, and public engagement.

== Education ==
The farm encourages school visits so that city children can learn about farm life. It offers courses on beekeeping and gardening, placements for students studying animal-related courses, and supports people with special needs. It has an education building with a purpose-built classroom. The farm hosts a work club for over-18s.
