= Skegness Academy =

Location
- Burgh Road; Skegness, Lincolnshire, PE25 2QH; England; 53°09′05″N 0°19′49″E

Information
- Type: Academy
- Trust: Greenwood Academies Trust UID 3251
- Department for Education URN: 136217 Tables
- Ofsted: Reports
- Gender: Coeducational
- Age: 11 to 19
- Colour: purple/black
- Website: http://www.skegnessacademy.org/

Skegness Academy is a coeducational secondary school and sixth form with academy status, in Skegness, Lincolnshire, England.

== History ==
=== Secondary modern schools ===
Skegness Secondary School opened in 1932.

By 1951, the school was overcrowded. By 1956 around 720 children in Skegness would need secondary modern education. The secondary school could not be enlarged to hold 720 children, so John Birkbeck, the director of education of Lindsey Education Committee proposed a new two-form mixed secondary modern school by 1956. On Friday 13 April 1956 Lindsey Education Committee decided to call the former secondary modern school the Lumley Secondary Modern School, and the new secondary modern would be the Morris Secondary Modern School, named after Canon A.H. Morris, the former rector of Skegness. The new head of the Morris school would be Ronald Johnson from Macclesfield, who had been headteacher of Winterton Secondary Modern School for seven years.

Morris Secondary School opened with 240 children, with places for 300. Ronald Johnson had served in the war as a Captain with the Royal Artillery. He moved to the Army Education Corps, working at the headquarters in Jerusalem, and lectured at the Army College of Education in Haifa. He mentioned to the children of his knowledge of Bethlehem and Nazareth. The Morris school opened Tuesday 4 September 1956, on Church Road, being built by Adkins of Boston.; it was officially opened by the Earl of Scarbrough on Monday 30 September 1957, with the chairman of Lindsey County Council, Sir Weston Cracroft-Amcotts, of Kettlethorpe Hall. Mr T Bagshaw, the deputy head of Ullswater School, in Penrith, took over as headteacher in June 1966, when Ronald Johnson resigned, due to ill health. Mr Bagshaw moved in January 1973. Brian Drinkall, deputy head of the William Allitt School in south Derbyshire, took over in January 1974.

=== Merger ===
Lumley merged with Morris to form the Earl of Scarbrough High School in 1986. The Earl of Scarbrough High School was officially opened on Tuesday 7 November. A new £400,000 block was built from 1995, to open in 1996.

Skegness Earl of Scarbrough High School continued until 2004 when it was closed, and reopened as St Clements College.

=== Academy ===
This 'fresh start' school converted to academy status in 2010, being one of the first academy schools in England, and was renamed Skegness Academy. The Skegness Academy is part of the Greenwood Academies Trust .

In 2017 Skegness Academy was found 'inadequate' by Ofsted but has 'ambitious plan for improvement'. Skegness Academy has since been monitored closely by Ofsted.

In January 2020, Ofsted did a full inspection and acknowledged that the improvements had been put in place, but would take time to show effect. As a result, the school was removed from special measures as is now rated as 'requiring improvement'.

== Curriculum ==
A higher proportion than average enter the school with attainment that is significantly below the national average need support to effectively to develop literacy and numeracy skills.

During Key Stage 3, pupils are taught English, mathematics, science, geography, history, RE, modern foreign languages, ICT, technology (including food technology), expressive arts (music, drama), art and PE. Key Stage 3 includes years 7, 8, and 9. Twenty minutes a day is devoted to a recreational reading session (Drop Everything and Read).

In years 10 and 11, pupils choose four subjects to go with the core subjects Maths, English, Science, in either Level 2 BTEC or GCSE format, and PE.

=== Pathways ===
At Sixth Form three pathways are offered, students can take the Academic Pathway with A-Levels for university entry, the Core Level 3 pathway which includes Level 3 BTECs and can also retake GCSE Maths and English if they have not achieved a Level 4 grade or above at Year 11. There is a Level 2 pathway offering vocational courses

The Sixth Form has a 100% pass rate across all Level 3 courses.

== Notable former pupils ==
=== Lumley Secondary Modern School ===
- Ray Clemence, England and Liverpool goalkeeper throughout the 1970s

=== Morris Secondary Modern School ===
- Graham Bonnet (1958–64), rock singer, known for the 1979 song Since You Been Gone

=== Earl of Scarbrough High School ===
- Jason Atherton, chef
- Helen Dobson, golfer
