= Greenwood Academies Trust =

Multi-academy trust in the English Midlands

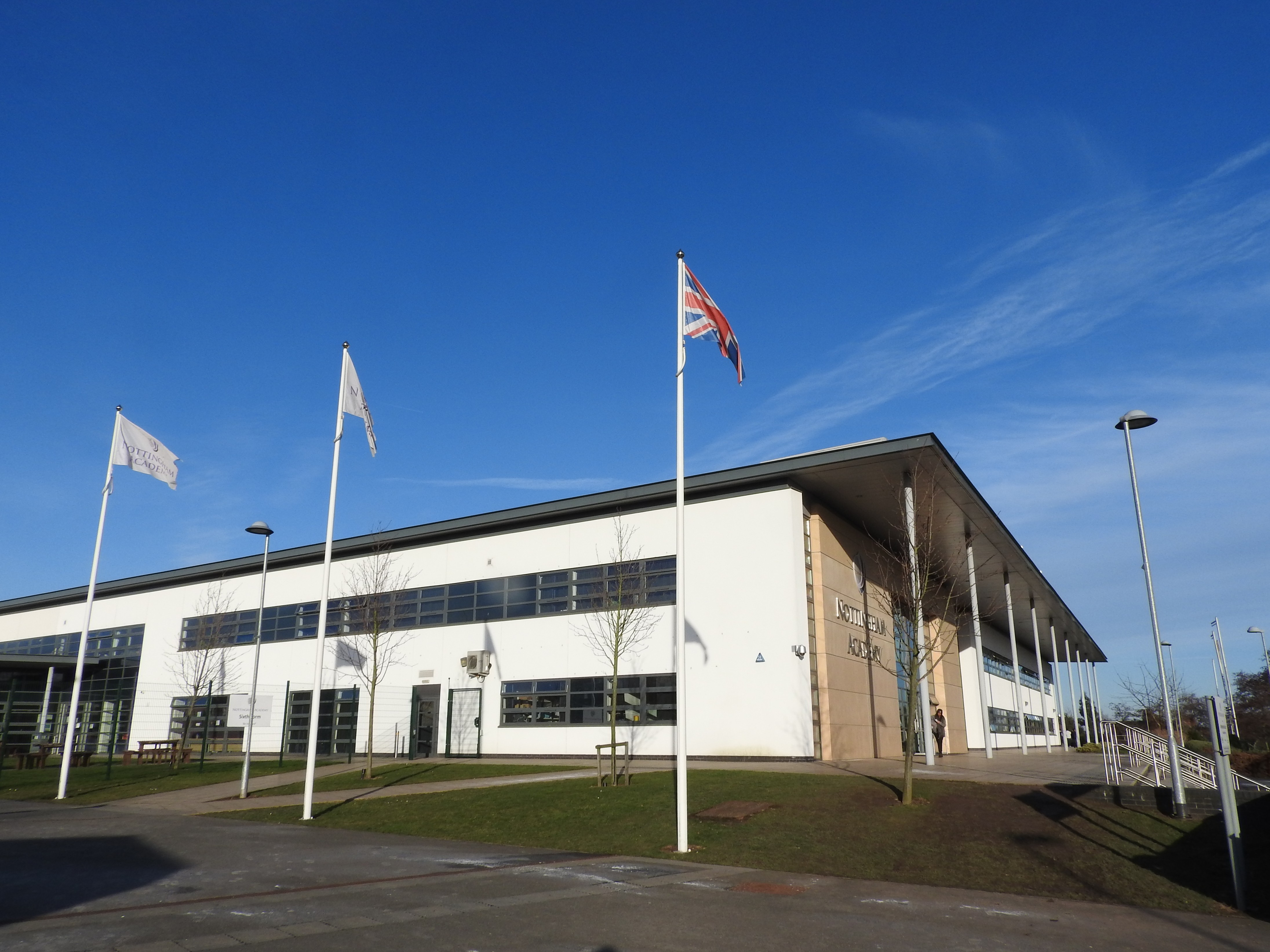
- Nottingham Academy, the trust's 'mother academy'.

Address
- Greenwood House, Colwick Quays Business Park, Private Road No 2, Colwick, Nottingham, Nottinghamshire, NG4 2JY; United Kingdom
- Coordinates: 52.955183°N 1.077013°W

District information
- Type: Multi-academy trust
- Established: 31 March 2009; 16 years ago
- Chair of the board: Mike Hamlin

Other information
- Website: www.greenwoodacademies.org

The Greenwood Academies Trust is a large multi-academy trust in England, centred around the Nottingham Academy, which was formerly the Greenwood Dale School. There are 34 academies within the trust, educating over 17,000 pupils.

== Organisation ==
The academies within the trust are clustered into four geographical regions:

1. East Coast
2. Northamptonshire / Central Bedfordshire
3. Nottingham / Leicester
4. Peterborough

Each region has a liaising advisor. Individual schools do not have local governing bodies but advisory panels.

A Central Team operates across the trust providing support services for finance, ICT, procurement, human resources, catering, data, curriculum development, staff development, health and safety. Schools have control of 94.5% of their budget: the Central Team budget is 5.5%.

== Academies ==
- Beacon Primary Academy, Skegness, 4-11
- Bishop Creighton Academy, Peterborough, 4-11
- City of Peterborough Academy, 11-16
- City of Peterborough Academy Special School, 4-18
- Corby Primary Academy, 4-11
- Danesholme Infant Academy, Corby, 3-7
- Danesholme Junior Academy, Corby, 7-11
- Dogsthorpe Academy, Peterborough, 7-11
- Green Oaks Primary Academy, Northampton, 3-11
- Hazel Leys Academy, Corby, 3-11
- Ingoldmells Academy, 4-11
- Kingswood Primary Academy, Corby, 3-11
- Kingswood Secondary Academy, Corby, 11-18
- Mansfield Primary Academy, 3-11
- Mablethorpe Primary Academy, 3–11
- Nethergate Academy, Nottingham 5-19
- Newark Hill Academy, 4-11
- Nottingham Academy, 3-18
- Nottingham Girls' Academy, 11-18
- Purple Oaks Academy, Northampton, 3-18
- Queensmead Primary Academy, Leicester, 3-11
- Rushden Primary Academy, 4-11
- Skegby Junior Academy, 3-11
- Skegness Academy, 11-18
- Skegness Infant Academy, 3-7
- Skegness Junior Academy, 7-11
- Studfall Junior Academy
- Studfall Infant Academy
- Stanground Academy, Peterborough, 11-18
- Sunnyside Primary Academy, Northampton, 4-11
- Welland Academy, Peterborough, 4-11
- The Wells Academy, Nottingham, 11-16
- The Brunts Academy, Nottingham, 11-18
- The Bramble Academy, Nottingham, 3-11
- Weston Favell Academy, Northampton, 11-18
- Woodvale Primary Academy, Northampton, 3-11

== Cancelled projects ==
=== Waterside Primary Academy ===
Waterside Primary Academy was a planned Free School with academy status located in the city of Nottingham in Nottinghamshire, England. Plans for the school were announced in 2020, with planning permission approved in 2023. It was planned to have capacity for 210 children, with a capacity for 30 nursery aged children. Waterside Primary Academy was built at a total cost of £11.5 million.

Waterside Primary Academy was planned to open in September 2024, but this date was missed and the opening date was delayed until the following year. Funding for Waterside Primary Academy from the department for Education was pulled in December 2024 due to the low number of applications for places at the school.

In January 2025 it was announced that Greenwood Academies Trust had dropped plans to open Waterside Primary Academy. In March 2025 it was announced that former school buildings would be used to expand Rosehill specialist School, with a planned opening date for the expanded specialist school of 2026.
