= The Wells Academy =

Location
- Ransom Drive; St Ann's; Nottingham, Nottinghamshire, NG3 5LR; England

Information
- Type: Comprehensive; Academy
- Established: 1966
- Local authority: Nottingham City Council
- Trust: Greenwood Academies Trust
- Department for Education URN: 147456 Tables
- Ofsted: Reports
- Principal: George Coles
- Gender: Co-educational
- Age: 11 to 16
- Website: www.thewellsacademy.org

The Wells Academy is a co-educational secondary school for 11-16 yr olds, located in the St Ann's area of Nottingham in the English county of Nottinghamshire.

== History ==
Elliott Durham School was established at the current school site in 1966. It was designed as an 11 to 16 co-educational school housed in its own purpose-built accommodation on a very attractive site. The sports facilities included a sports hall with a full size of basketball court, four badminton courts and areas for gymnastics, indoor football, netball and hockey, and a small carpeted hall for dance and aerobics. Outside there are four tennis courts, two floodlit astro-turf fields, extensive playing fields and pool. The school was not popular with parents and though having a capacity of 1350, it had only 353 students on roll on 2003.

It had just 21% A* to C grades at GCSE in 2007, including maths and English, though that was a rise on the 7% two years previously; considerably down on the 47.6% average for secondary schools in England. It was a classified as a "national challenge" school, ones where fewer than 30% of pupils achieve five GCSE passes including in maths and English, it was told to rapidly improve or close down.

In 2009 it formally merged with Greenwood Dale School and The Jesse Boot Primary School to form Nottingham Academy, a new City Academy which was located over the former three school sites. Nottingham Academy was sponsored by the Greenwood Academies Trust. The former Elliot Durham School site was then renamed The Nottingham Academy Ransom Campus and refurbished.

In November 2018 the Greenwood Academies Trust announced plans to de-merge the two secondary school sites, with The Nottingham Academy Ransom Campus becoming a separate school. The changes took effect from September 2020: The Nottingham Academy Ransom Campus becoming 'The Wells Academy'.

== The school ==
The Wells Academy is a 5 form entry 11-16 secondary school sponsored by the Greenwood Academies Trust. It offers GCSEs and BTECs as programmes of study for pupils. The school also offers an alternative curriculum provision located at the Mapperley Sports Village.
