= Bernard Tomlinson =

British neuropathologist

Sir Sir Bernard Tomlinson CBE
- Born: July 13, 1920; Ashfield, Nottinghamshire, England
- Died: May 26, 2017 (aged 96)
- Education: University College Hospital
- Occupations: Neuropathologist, academic
- Spouse: Betty Oxley
- Awards: Commander of the Order of the British Empire (CBE, 1981), Knight Bachelor (1988)

Sir Bernard Evans Tomlinson CBE (13 July 1920 – 26 May 2017) was a distinguished neuropathologist.

== Biography ==
He was born in Ashfield, the second of four children. The family lived in Huthwaite and he went to Brunts Grammar School. His elder brother also became a doctor, and his younger twin sisters became nurses. He married Betty Oxley, who also lived in Huthwaite.

He trained as a clinical pathologist at University College Hospital and joined the Socialist Medical Association. He campaigned for the establishment of the NHS during the 1945 election. He did two years’ National Service in the Royal Army Medical Corps. He was appointed in 1949 as senior registrar in pathology and deputy director of pathology at Newcastle General Hospital and was professor of pathology at Newcastle University from 1973 to 1985. The family moved to Low Fell. His main research was into dementia and Alzheimer’s. In 1982 he was appointed by Norman Fowler to chair the Northern Regional Health Authority, the first medic to do so.

He was appointed CBE in the 1981 Birthday Honours, and he was knighted in 1988.

In 1991 he was asked by William Waldegrave to produce a report on Healthcare in London, which was known as the Tomlinson review. It recommended the closure of Charing Cross Hospital, Middlesex Hospital and St Bartholomew's Hospital, the merger of Guy’s and Thomas’ and the closure of ten smaller hospitals. The government accepted the report. Middlesex did close; Guy's and Thomas' did merge, but most of the recommendations were not implemented because they were too controversial.

In discussions about bovine spongiform encephalopathy in 1996, he told You and Yours that he would not eat beefburgers “under any circumstances” and was attacked by Angela Browning for saying so.
