= The Brunts Academy =

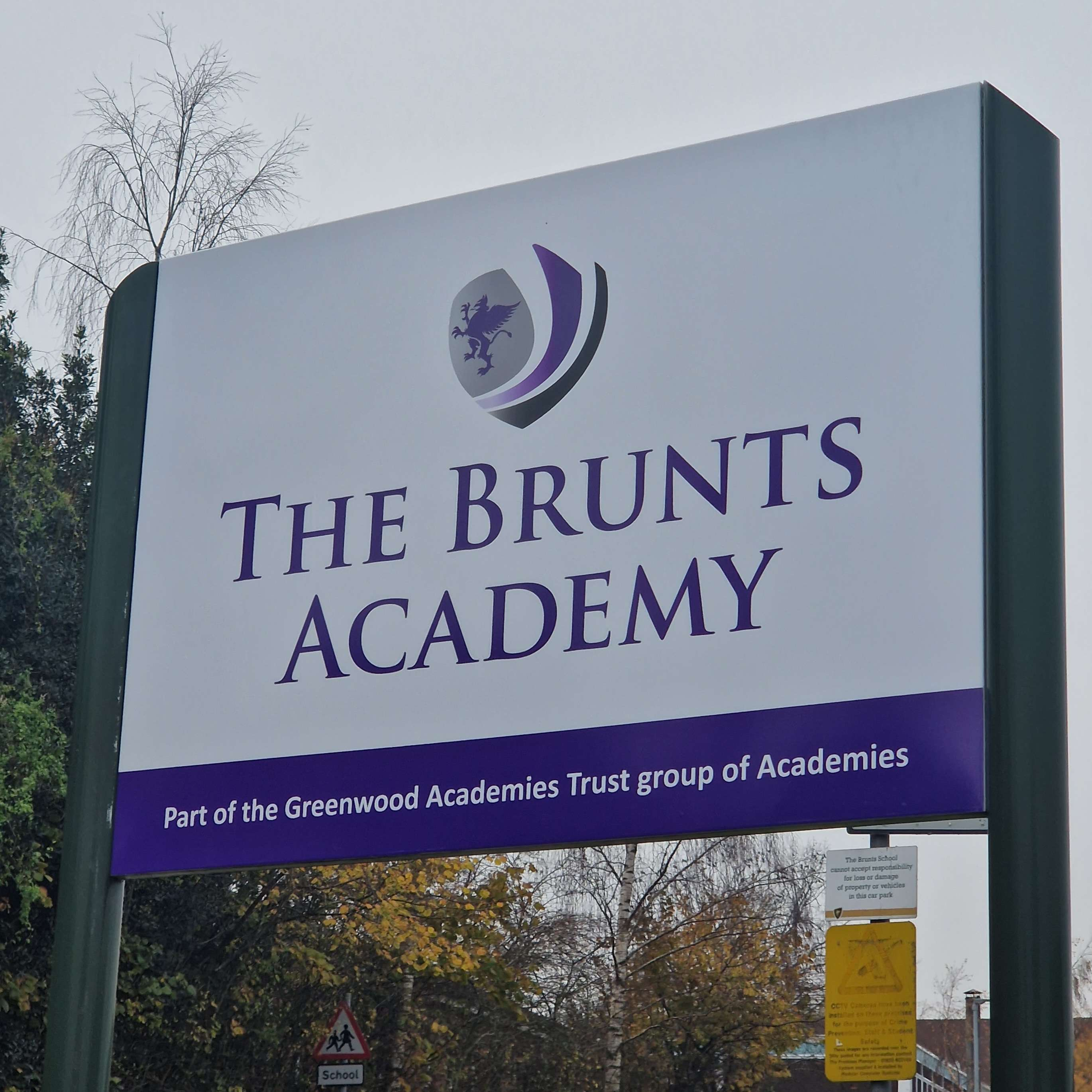

Location
- The Park; Mansfield, Nottinghamshire, NG18 2AT; England; 53.1515°N 1.1896°W

Information
- Type: Academy
- Motto: Latin: Nil mortalibus ardui est (Nothing is impossible for humankind)
- Established: 1709; 317 years ago
- Founder: Samuel Brunt
- Department for Education URN: 137763 Tables
- Ofsted: Reports
- Principal: Chris Fisher
- Senior Deputy Headteacher: Jess Pearson, Lindsey Maycock
- Deputy Principal: Steve Taylor, Michelle Hackett
- Executive Principal: Chris Fisher
- Director of Post 16: Abi Olsen
- Secondary years taught: Year 7 through Year 13
- Gender: Coeducational
- Age: 11 to 18
- Enrolment: 1451
- Colours: Gold; Green; Grey; Purple; Black
- Sixth form: 288
- Local affiliations: Greenwood Academies Trust
- SENCo: Yasmin Ensor
- Website: The Brunts Academy

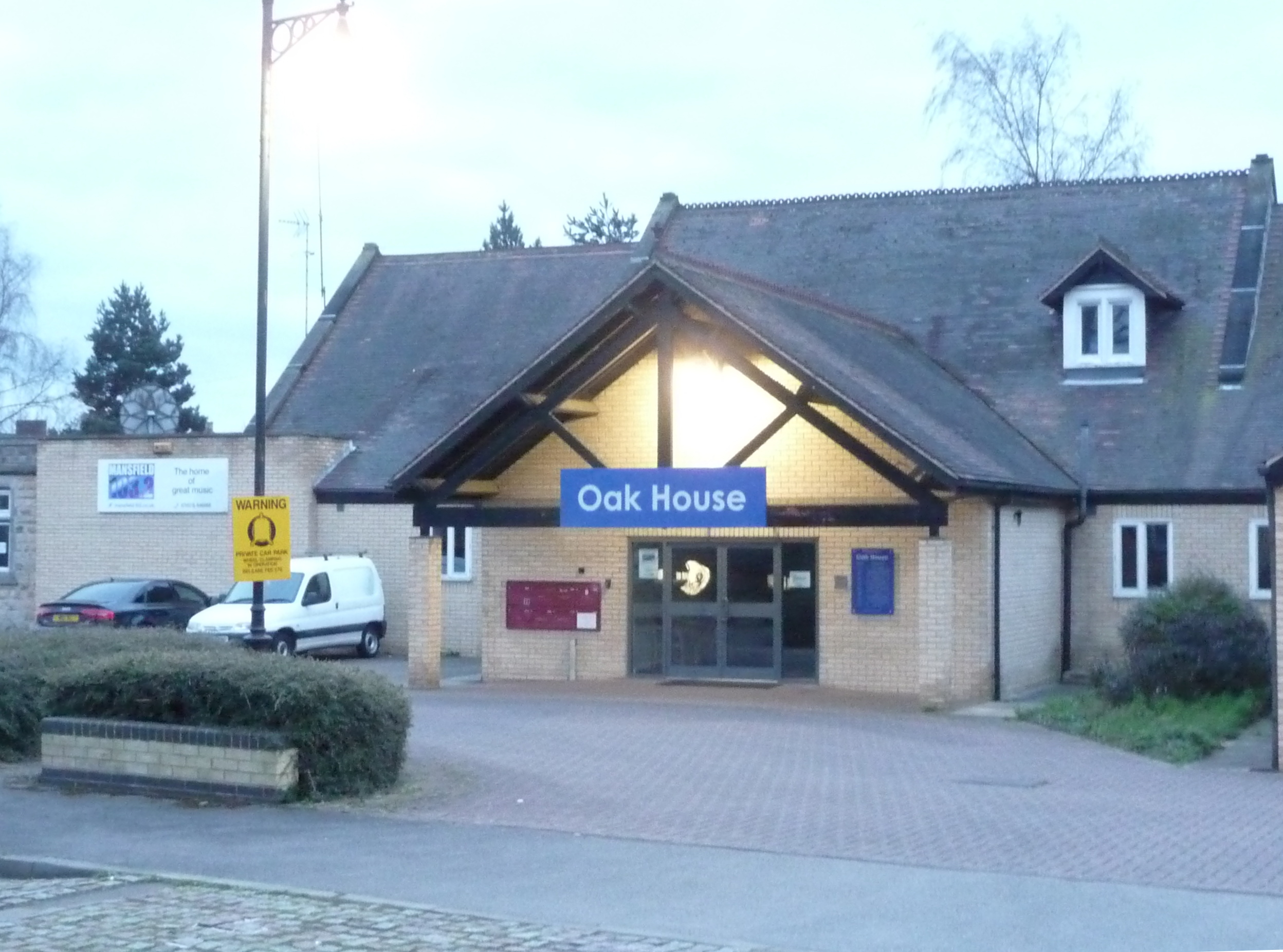
Part of the old Brunts Grammar School buildings off Woodhouse Road, Mansfield, re-developed into offices housing Mansfield 103.2 FM local radio station, and with some new buildings in the former grounds

The Brunts Academy, a large secondary school in Mansfield, Nottinghamshire, England, is a member of the Greenwood Academies Trust. The school specialises in the performing arts. It has previously been a grammar school and a secondary technical school and traces its foundation to a bequest by Samuel Brunt in 1709.

The Brunts School became The Brunts Academy with effect from 1 January 2012.

The Brunts Academy became a part of the Greenwood Academies Trust and left the Evolve Trust, effective 1 December 2022.

== History ==
The Brunts Academy can trace its history back to an elementary school that was founded in 1687 and had endowments equal to £100 per year. In 1709, Samuel Brunt left a bequest in order that local children could learn an honest trade. The bequest and the school resulted in 40 boys and girls learning reading, writing and arithmetic by 1831 with the girls particularly studying needlework. It was not until 60 years later that the school and the bequest were combined. In recognition of his significance in the school's founding, Brunt was referenced in the school's former 'school song', composed in 1944 by former music teachers H S Rosen and A D Sanders.

In 1830 Brunts Charity owned buildings and land in East Bridgford, Nottingham's marketplace and at Claypole in Lincolnshire. It was the richest of all the charitable foundations in Mansfield in 1832 when it was paying out £4 a year (equivalent to £387 in 2025) to 220 different claimants.

By 1891, Samuel Brunt's bequest was worth £3,800 (equivalent to £417,438 in 2025) and a new school was established and named Brunts Technical School. School buildings were erected for it at Woodhouse Road, Mansfield, and the new Technical School had its official opening on 29 September 1894. In 1976, Brunts Grammar School was closed and a new comprehensive school opened on the site, using the grammar school's buildings. The school had left the site by 1999, transferring to a new home on a greenfield site nearby at The Park.

The Samuel Brunts Statue was formerly on the front of the old Black Boy Hotel in Nottingham Market Place. When the hotel was pulled down, a Mansfield coal merchant rescued the statue and gave it to the school. It now sits in the Memorial Garden. Above the door to Brunts Chambers, at the corner of Clumber Street and Leeming Street, there is another statue of Brunt.

The School Song. The former grammar school had its own school song, composed by a music teacher.

Old Samuel Brunts was a yeoman staunch
In the days of good Queen Anne.
He’d a heart as big as his periwig
And he loved his fellow man.
As he strolled one day down Toothill Lane
With his red-heeled shoes and his gold-topped cane
He took a pinch of choice rappee
"And I know what I’ll do with my lands", said he.

== Organisation ==
The school's intake is taken from a number of schools known as the 'family of schools'. The list includes King Edward School, Sutton Road School, St Peter's (C of E) School, High Oakham School and Newgate Primary School.

The school uniform includes distinctive green blazers for both boys and girls. The school colours are green, gold, white, purple, grey and black and the school emblem is a rearing griffin within a shield with the academy's motto, Latin: Nil mortalibus ardui est, meaning "nothing is impossible for humankind" emblazoned upon it.

== Academic standards ==
In 2002, there were nearly 1,500 pupils in the school, of whom fewer than 1,300 were at age 16 or below. The school achieved 57% A-C passes with only 5% achieving no passes at all. This was 5% better than the county and 10% above the national average.

Overall the school is characterised by a high proportion of white pupils compared with the national average and nearly all students have English as their first language. Attainment was "broadly average" at the visit of Her Majesty's Inspectorate in 2009 (before academy status); the school was assessed as "satisfactory" with higher marks for its pastoral care. A subsequent Ofsted two-day audit in 2013 returned "good" findings across all areas inspected.

The Sixth Form at The Brunts Academy has achieved a 100% pass rate for the third year in a row since 2020

== Notable former pupils ==
- Rebecca Adlington, double Olympic gold medal-winning swimmer.
- Nicholas Crafts (1949–2023), professor of economics and economic history
- Eric Jakeman (1939– ), professor of statistics
- Jim McGrath, TV commentator
- Adrian Metcalfe (1942– ) UK athlete, silver medal winner Tokyo Olympics 1964
- Bernard Tomlinson (1920–2017), pathologist
- Tom Scott, educator and YouTube personality.
- Calvin Robinson, Anglican deacon, political commentator, journalist, policy advisor and campaigner

== Awards ==
In 2003 Brunts was awarded the Artsmark Gold Award and in 2006 the Healthy Schools Gold Standard and the Full International School Award.

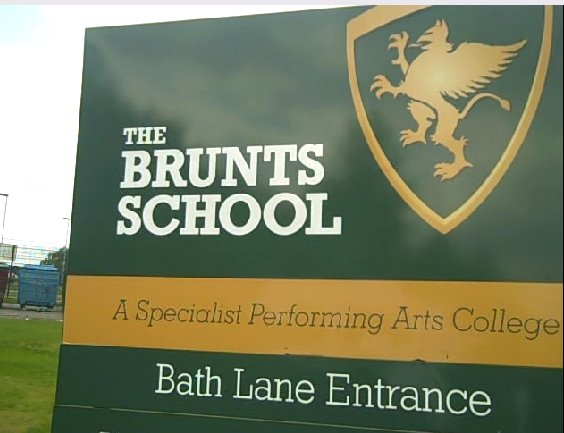
Old Logo used before 1 December 2022. The logo has since changed to the new logo as a part of the Greenwood Academies Trust handover.
