= Mansfield Radio =

Radio station in Mansfield, England

- Mansfield; England
- Broadcast area: North Nottinghamshire and north-east Derbyshire
- Frequency: 103.2 FM

Programming
- Format: Adult contemporary

History
- First air date: 1 February 1999; 27 years ago

Technical information
- Transmitter coordinates: 53.1405°N 1.2330°W

Links
- Website: Mansfield Radio

Mansfield Radio (formerly Mansfield 103.2FM) is an independent local radio station in Mansfield, Nottinghamshire, serving the areas of Mansfield and Ashfield in Nottinghamshire and nearby Bolsover in Derbyshire.

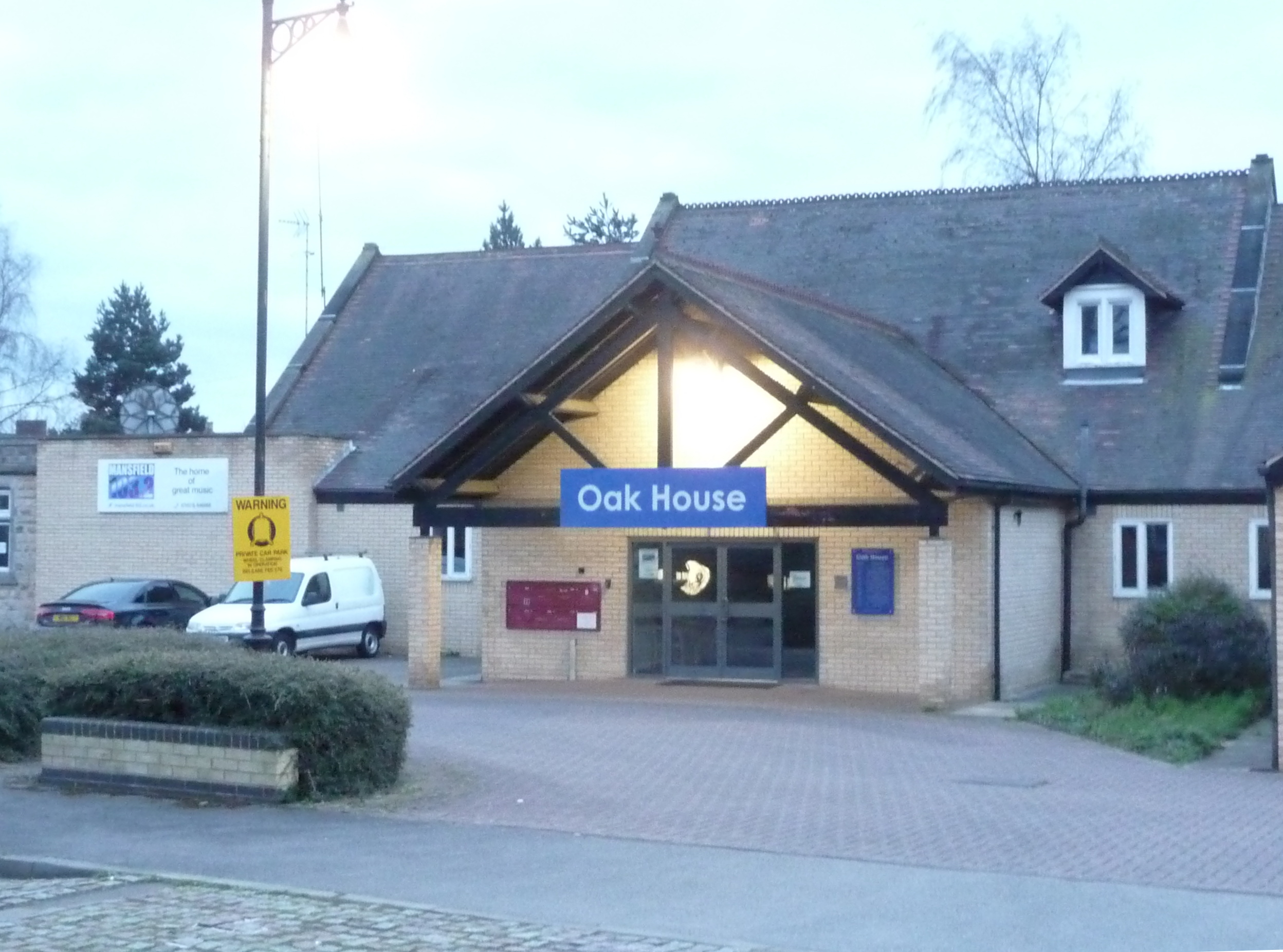
Mansfield Radio’s studios are situated within Brunts old grammar-school buildings

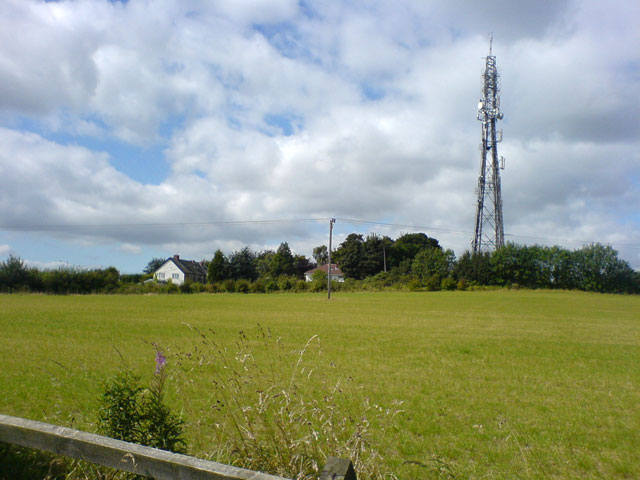
Shared transmitter at Fishpond Hill

It was launched in 1999 after winning a licence to broadcast from the Radio Authority in 1998. Based at the Brunts Business Centre, near the centre of Mansfield, it uses a shared transmitter mast sited at Fishpond Hill, on the outskirts of Mansfield near to Skegby.

Mansfield 103.2's Managing Director was Tony Delahunty, and the Managing Editor was Ian Watkins.

The station, one of only a few independent local commercial broadcasters, celebrated its 25-year anniversary as Mansfield's only local radio station in 2024.

As of December 2023, the station broadcast to a weekly audience of 25,000, according to RAJAR.

On 14 September 2026, following a transfer of ownership from Tony Delahunty to Paul and Nicola Chadbourne in May 2026, the station rebranded to Mansfield Radio. Former Managing Editor, 25-year veteran of the station Ian Watkins, known as "Watko", becomes programme director.

== Programming ==
Schedules include news on the hour. The news is local, national, and international from Sky News, as well as local news bulletins aired from the 103.2 news team based at Samuel Brunts Way every morning at 7am, 8am, 9am and 10am, and each weekday afternoon at 4pm, 5pm and 6pm.

The main programming consists of a breakfast show (presented by Sean Goldsmith on weekdays, Si Gilmore on Saturdays and Katie Trinder on Sundays), a mid-morning show (presented by Jason Harrison on weekdays and Katie Trinder at weekends), an afternoon show (presented by Ian Watkins on weekdays and Sundays, and Rob Wain on Saturdays), a teatime show weekdays presented by Marc Steele, a Friday late night show, presented by James Hilton, and weekend lunchtime shows “The Adam Moss Saturday Show” and “The Major Roast with Paul and Nikki” on Sunday, both 12-2pm.

Extra programmes include Chequered Flag with Matt Edwards on Monday evenings (during the motorsport season and in place of the teatime show), Jukebox Giants with Ron Coles on Sunday evenings, and the 80s and 90s School Reunions on Friday and Saturday nights respectively, in place of the evening shows on each day. Following the rebrand to Mansfield Radio, new presenter Lee Glasby joined the station, first as a cover presenter, and now presents the Saturday Evening Show from 9pm to Midnight. When there is no presenter on, the station airs non-stop music programmes.

When a presenter is off, whilst sometimes the shows are aired as non-stop music, most of the time the shows is covered by another presenter. The main cover presenters are Aaron Outram, and regular Katie Trinder. Occasionally, shows are also covered by regular presenters Lee Glasby, John B Tannen, Jason Harrison and James Hilton.

Following the station’s name change, in November 2026 Sean Goldsmith took over “The Breakfast Show” from John B Tannen, who had been presenting it for 6 years and had worked with the station for over 20 years.

== News and sport coverage ==
Mansfield 103.2 has a news and sport team based at Samuel Brunts Way, staffed by the managing editor and broadcast journalists, there are national and local news updates on the hour. Each Saturday in the football season there are regular updates on local games in the area including Mansfield Town, Chesterfield F.C. Derby County, Nottingham Forest, Notts County, South Normanton Athletic F.C., Glapwell F.C., Shirebrook Town F.C. and Sutton Town F.C.

== Outside broadcasts ==
Mansfield 103.2 had an outside broadcast unit named Fix Auto Street Crusader, which was in use until 2024. The vehicle was operated by the commercial producer and engineer, with an outside broadcast team. There are still outside broadcasts on the station, including visits to local charities, public events, openings, businesses and services.

== The Gooseberry Pork Pie ==
In July 2010, Mansfield 103.2 revived a 70-year-old Mansfield Tradition of a Gooseberry Pork Pie. Years ago in Mansfield, the town would celebrate with a giant pork pie filled with Gooseberries. The pie was not made since the end of the Second World War, but in July 2010 The Breakfast Show brought back the tradition, by creating a batch of small gooseberry filled pies with the help of local butchers.

== See also ==
- That Friday Feeling
- Mansfield Town FC
