= St Ann's, Nottingham =

Area of Nottingham, England

Coordinates: 52.962°N 1.136°W

St Ann's
- Suburb
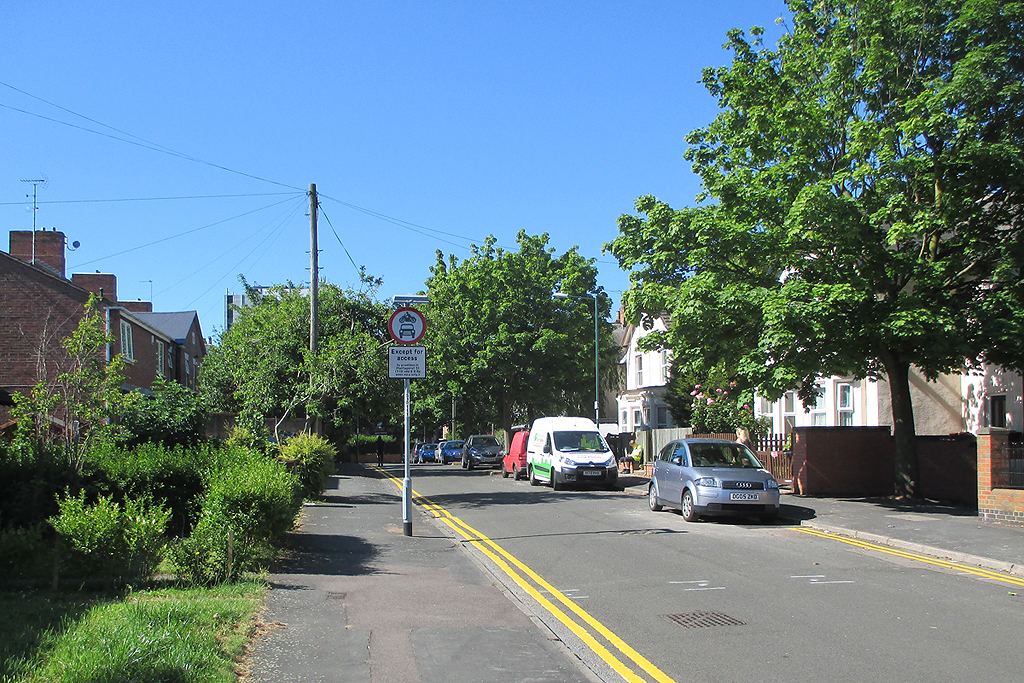
- Plantagenet Street

- Location within Nottinghamshire
- Population: 19,316 (Ward 2011)
- OS grid reference: SK 58028 40898
- Unitary authority: Nottingham
- Ceremonial county: Nottinghamshire
- Region: East Midlands
- Country: England
- Sovereign state: United Kingdom
- Post town: NOTTINGHAM
- Postcode district: NG3
- Dialling code: 0115
- Police: Nottinghamshire
- Fire: Nottinghamshire
- Ambulance: East Midlands
- UK Parliament: Nottingham East

St Ann's
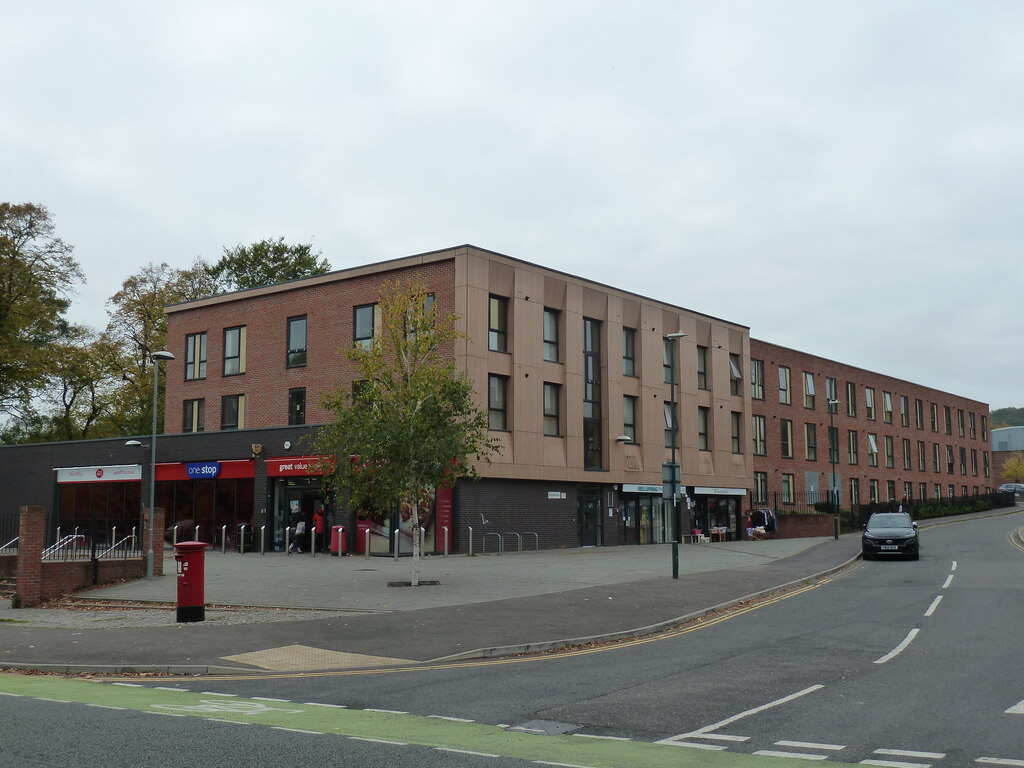
- St Ann’s shops
- Interactive map of St Ann's

General information
- Location: Nottingham, UK
- Status: Stable
- Area: 1,068 acres (432 ha)
- Population: 15000 (2005)

Construction
- Constructed: 1970
- Contractors: George Wimpey
- Authority: City of Nottingham
- Style: Radburn

St Ann's is a large district of the city of Nottingham. The population of the district based on the 2011 census was 19,316.

== History ==
The name St Ann's is possibly derived from an ancient well in the area, once thought to have healing properties. It was recorded in 1301 as The Brodewell and in other historical references it was called the O[w]swell or Robin Hood's Well.

In 1500, the spring was appropriated by monks who built a chapel adjacent to the well and dedicated the site to St. Ann. There are several ancient names attached to the area; Peas Hill (1230), Hunger Hills (1304) and Clay Fields.

The development of the St Ann's perhaps began as early as 1750 when Charles Morley, Sheriff in 1737-8, manufactured brown earthenware very prosperously in a small factory in Beck Street, his speciality being his brown beer jugs.

In the 1830s, Clay Fields was divided into plots. Until the passing of the St. Mary's Nottingham Inclosure Act 1845 (8 & 9 Vict. c. 7 Pr.), the area was largely uninhabited and formed part of the Clay Fields area. After that date, the council was able to develop the land, and the area became known as St Ann's. An associated church, St. Ann's Church, was constructed in the 1860s to serve the community. The foundation stone was laid on 23 September 1863 by Sydney Pierrepont, 3rd Earl Manvers. The church was consecrated on 26 September 1864, and was a daughter church of St. Mary the Virgin, Nottingham.

The St. Mary's Nottingham Inclosure Act 1845 allowed the city to take 1,068 acres (432 ha) of the Clay Fields. It was used for housing, and by 1880 the building of 'New Town' was complete. It was specifically built for the working poor. They were very basic cottages, with a butcher, a baker, a large number of public houses, a market place and, for the first time in Britain, allotments where the poor could grow their vegetables. The Public Health Act 1875 enabled local authorities to make byelaws to regulate such building. Here, all the houses were pre-Public Health Act terraced houses, on a gridiron plan arranged around courts of ten houses. These were later demolished under slum clearance legislation of the 1960s.

According to McKenzie (2015), the estate was a town within a town; the local constabulary refused to enter St Ann's estate, so policing was managed by the residents relying on 'family affiliation'. It was an area of hard work and low pay that culturally was separate from Nottingham. It was also an area of 10,000 houses where only 9% had an inside toilet, and 50% had no hot water system - many of the yards had shared toilets and open sewers leading to endemic dysentery and cholera. Infant mortality was three times the national average. Clearances of houses such as these started in 1930, but because of the war 'New Town' continued until 1970. The houses were flattened and the residents dispersed.

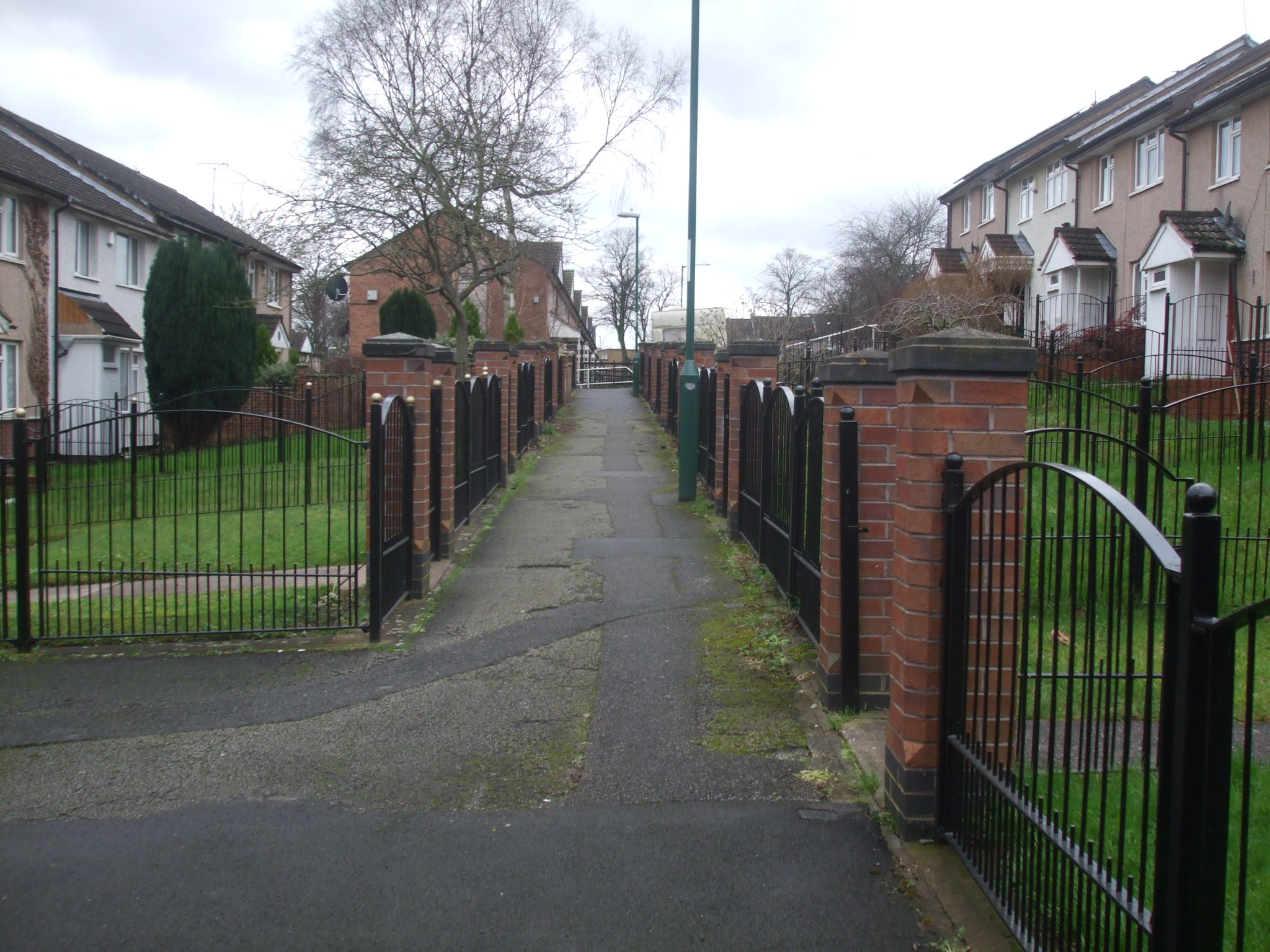
Tulip Avenue house, from Hungerhill Road, looking towards Robin Hood Chase park (2016)

In 1970, the Victorian streets were replaced with a Radburn style estate. While this introduced a more modern housing stock, the confusing pattern of facing houses with differing street names and the maze of undistinguishable walk-ways made the new estate impenetrable to outsiders. The houses were built by Wimpey, using prefabricated techniques. The first residents were proud of the houses, but critical of the design of the estate. Radburn estates worldwide have since become widely unpopular, often referred to as an urban design layout that is typified by failure because of its laneways and interconnected green squares being used as common entries and exits to houses – helping to isolate communities and encourage crime, with roads and car courts poorly surveilled.

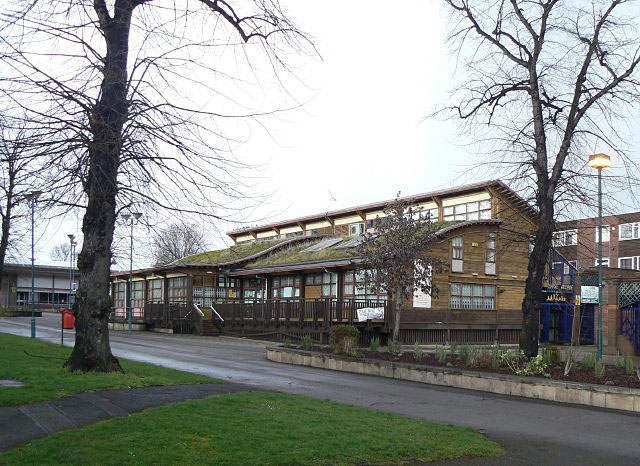
The Chase Neighbourhood Centre (2009)

== Government ==
St Ann's lies within the unitary authority of Nottingham, and so is governed by Nottingham City Council.

== Geography ==
St Ann's lies east of Nottingham city centre, with Thorneywood to the north east and Carlton Road forming the unofficial boundary with Sneinton to the south.

== Demography ==
In common with other parts of the city, the largely working-class population is still affected by the collapse of manufacturing industry and much of the area scores badly on government measures of deprivation. It is ethnically mixed with a strong sense of community. The population in 2005 was around 15,000.

St Ann's is home to people from all over the world, such as: Pakistan, Afghanistan, the West Indies, Iran, Romania, Greece, Portugal, Italy, Spain, Turkey, Somalia, Sudan, South Sudan, Brazil, Mexico, Guinea, Thailand, China, Japan and South Korea.

The area has a Pakistani Community Centre and the African Caribbean National Artistic Center (ACNA).

== Economy ==
In the nineteenth century, the local industries were lace and textile manufacturing, like most of Nottingham.

As of 2023, the area suffers from a lack of pubs, restaurants and shops, with locals left with few places to gather or meet and no major supermarket chains in the area. There is a weekly market, the St Ann's Market, which takes place every Tuesday morning.

There are several ethnic supermarkets including Jamaican, Pakistani, Somali, Portuguese, Italian and Greek. The two main ethnic supermarkets are Murat (which is Kurdish/Turkish) and Asiana, which is the largest oriental retail outlet in the East Midlands.

== Culture and community ==
The area takes its name from St Ann's Well, a spring once thought to have miraculous healing powers, at the junction of The Wells Road and Kildare Road. It was also known as The Brodewell, the Owswell, Robin Hood's Well, in records dating back to 1301. The people of Nottingham used to walk to St Ann's Well on Easter ('Black') Monday and celebrate with a party. It was covered by a spired structure from 1856 to 1887, which was demolished to make way for the railway and later built over by what became The Gardeners pub.

Stonebridge City Farm, which charges no admission fee, is an urban farm that is active in the community.

The last pub in the area was the Sycamore Inn, which closed in April 2014.

== Landmarks ==
The terraces north of Victoria Park have been listed as representing a style of domestic architecture that was once widespread but has been largely lost to bomb damage and slum clearance.

The St Ann's Allotments is the oldest and largest allotment site in England, created in the 1830s and now Grade II* listed as being of "Special Historic Interest". The allotments have received National Lottery funding for restoration, and were featured on the BBC's The One Show and Radio 4.

== Transport ==
The Nottingham Suburban Railway ran through the area, connecting Trent Lane junction in Sneinton with Daybrook, but bomb damage closed the Sneinton end in 1941 and the line ceased operations completely in 1951.

=== Bus services ===
Nottingham City Transport

■ 39: Nottingham → St Ann's (Beacon Hill Rise) → Thorneywood → Carlton Valley

■ 40: Nottingham → St Ann's → Sherwood → City Hospital Campus

■ 40B: Nottingham → St Ann's → The Wells Road Top

■ 41: Nottingham → St Ann's

■ 42: Nottingham → St Ann's

== Education ==
Blue Bell Hill Primary School is on Gordon Road along with Our Lady and St. Edwards Primary. The Wells Academy provides secondary education, along with the new St Ann's Well Academy on Hungerhill Rd. There is also Sycamore Academy and Huntingdon Academy.

== Religion ==
Religion in St Ann's (Ward 2011)
religion	per cent
Christianity	43.3%
Buddhism	1.3%
Hinduism	2.2%
Judaism	0.3%
Islam	9.3%
Sikhism	1.4%
Others	0.4%
No religion	33.5%
Unknown / None	8.3%

The parish church is St. Ann with Emmanuel; the RCCG Covenant Restoration Assembly St Anns meet in Blue Bell Hill Community Centre.

There are also two Mosques in the area with one in the Pakistani Centre and the Islamic Center.

== Sport ==
There are few sports facilities actually in St Ann's, but across the ring road is the National Ice Centre, an Olympic-sized ice rink that is both home to the Nottingham Panthers, and also acts a major music venue of Nottingham. Nottingham Racecourse, the local horse racing track, and the Nottingham Greyhound Stadium are also nearby.

== Media ==
Nottingham film-maker Shane Meadows used St Ann's for some scenes in the 2006 drama This Is England filmed in St Ann's.

Ray Gosling, broadcaster and writer, lived in St Ann's and wrote about it. He also introduced a film about poverty in the area by Thames Television.

== Social issues ==
There have been three academic studies based on the working class community of St Anns:

- Poverty: The Forgotten Englishmen, by Ken Coates and Bill Silburn : University of Nottingham
- Getting by: by Lisa McKenzie, LSE
- Narratives From a Nottingham Council Estate: a Story of White Working-Class Mothers With Mixed-Race Children, Ethnic and Racial Studies, by Lisa McKenzie

== See also ==
- St Ann's riots
- Listed buildings in Nottingham (St Ann's ward)
- St Ann's – other places with the same name
- The Meadows, Nottingham- similar Radburn style estate
