= Nottingham Suburban Railway =

British railway company

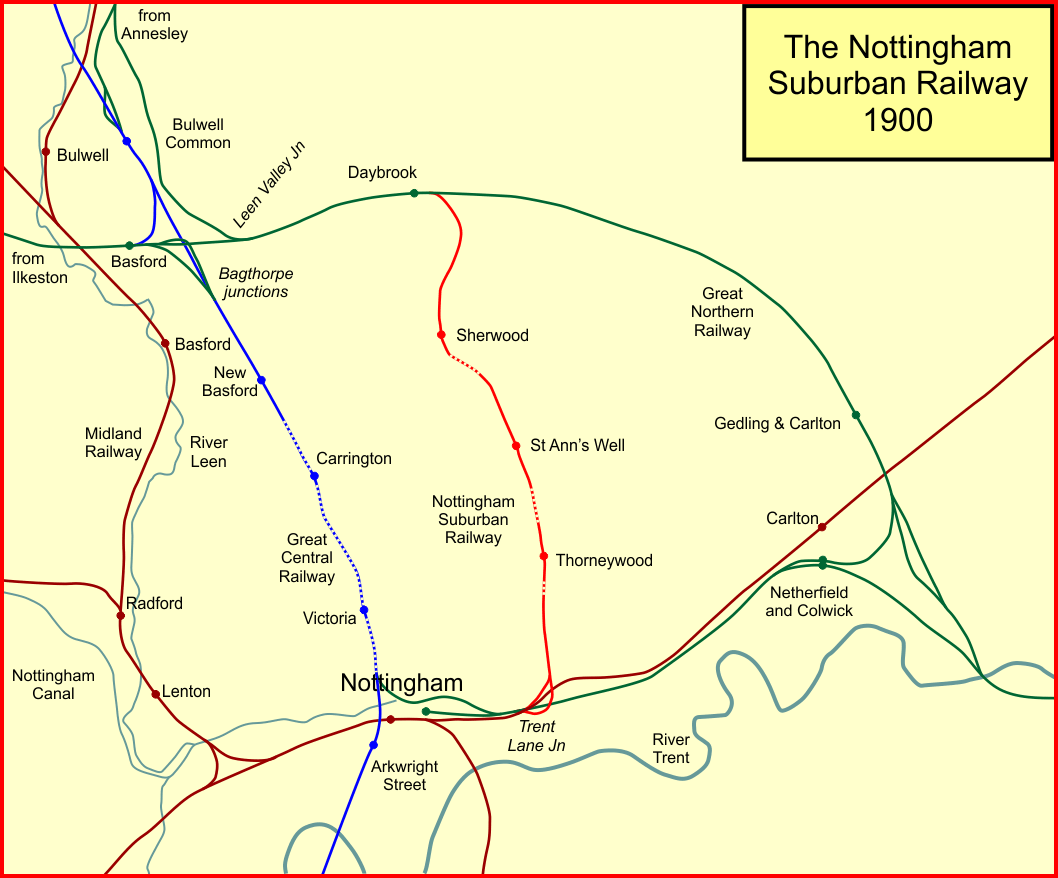
- The Railway in 1900

Overview
- Main region: Nottingham
- Stations called at: 3
- Parent company: Great Northern Railway
- Headquarters: Nottingham, England
- Dates of operation: December 2, 1889–August 1, 1951
- Successor: London and North Eastern Railway

Technical
- Track gauge: 1,435 mm (4 ft 8 1/2 in) standard gauge
- Length: 3.65 mi (5.87 km)

The Nottingham Suburban Railway was a British railway company that constructed a line 3.65 miles (5.87 km) in length serving the north-eastern suburbs of Nottingham. It was built to shorten the distance by train to Ilkeston and towns on the Leen Valley railway line, and to connect important brickworks near Nottingham. The short line was expensive to build due to difficult topography; it opened in December 1889, and was worked by the Great Northern Railway; the trains used that company's Nottingham terminus.

The line was soon by-passed by another route to the Leen Valley, and electric street-running trams attracted most of the local passenger business. Passenger stations on the line closed in 1916, and it closed completely in 1954.

== Great Northern Railway ==
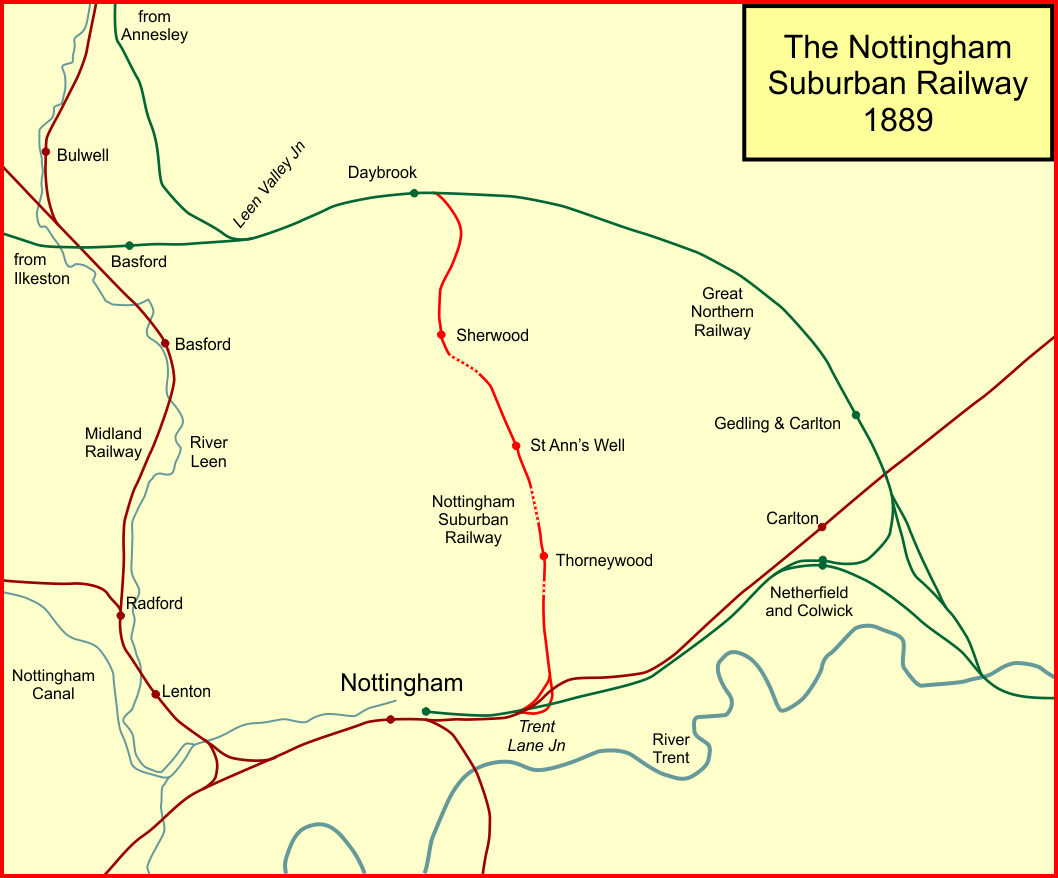
The Nottingham Suburban Railway in 1889

In 1875 the Great Northern Railway had opened the first part of its Derbyshire and Staffordshire extension, designed chiefly to get independent access to the coalfields of west Nottinghamshire and Derbyshire. Carrying coal south, to London and the southern counties was a lucrative business. In addition, the GNR had passenger business to Ilkeston, and to towns in the Leen Valley and beyond. The Great Northern Railway developed a traffic centre for its mineral business at Colwick, on the south-eastern side of Nottingham, and in time this was developed considerably as a marshalling point.

Carrying the GNR into Derbyshire had required a route making a circuit round the north of Nottingham from Colwick, but this meant that GNR passenger trains from Nottingham itself had to travel east, and then north and west. Reaching Daybrook, they had travelled 7 1/2 miles but were only 3 1/4 miles from their starting point. Moreover the heavy mineral traffic on the line led to considerable congestion delay.

== The Nottingham Suburban Railway promoted ==
Nottingham Suburban Railway Act 1886
- Act of Parliament
- Parliament of the United Kingdom
- Long title: An Act to incorporate a company for the construction of the Nottingham Suburban Railway; and for other purposes.
- Citation: 49 & 50 Vict. c. xciv

Dates
- Royal assent: 25 June 1886

In 1885 a group of local businesspeople formed a project to make a new railway running more directly to Daybrook; as well as greatly shortening the journey for the growing residential passenger business, the line would link in important brickworks at Thorneywood and Mapperley. The Nottingham Suburban Railway Act 1886 (49 & 50 Vict. c. xciv) was passed on 25 June 1886 authorising the construction; share capital was to be £250,000. The new company agreed to pay the GNR £100 for the right to make each (Note: Marshall; Birch, volume 1 page 28, says £100 for both.) of the new junctions with its line; the GNR would work the line, and had the power to acquire it after ten years, although this power was in fact never exercised.

The railways herein-before referred to and authorised by this Act are:—
- Railway No. 1 Three miles six furlongs five chains and fifty links in length commencing in the parish of Sneinton in the town and county of the town of Nottingham by a junction with the Nottingham and Grantham line of the Great Northern Railway at a point two chains or thereabouts in a westerly direction from the bridge carrying the said line over Meadow Lane and terminating in the parish of Arnold in the county of Nottingham by a junction with the Derby and Staffordshire line of the Great Northern Railway near the Daybrook Station:
- Railway No. 2 Nine chains in length situate wholly in the parish of Sneinton in the town and county of the town of Nottingham commencing by a junction with the Railway No. 1 near the junction of Thorney Wood Lane with Carlton Road and terminating near the junction of the occupation road leading from Thorney Wood Lane to the Nottingham Patent Brick Company's works with Thorney Wood Lane.
— Section 5, Nottingham Suburban Railway Act 1886 (49 & 50 Vict. c. xciv)

Nevertheless the GNR agreed to guarantee 3.5% on the projected £215,000 cost of the construction, and this and the working agreement were authorised by a second act of Parliament, the Great Northern Railway Act 1889 (52 & 53 Vict. c. xciv) of 26 July 1889. (Note: Marshall; Birch says (volume 1, page 29) 3% on £230,000.) In fact the final cost of the construction works was about £262,500.

The terrain was hilly, and three tunnels were required. Approaching Nottingham from Colwick, the GNR line ran south of the Midland Railway route from Newark, as far as Trent Lane, where the lines crossed over. The planned line was to join the GNR west of Trent Lane where it was on the north side of the Midland line. However this was objected to by the Board of Trade because approaching trains would be descending on a gradient of 1 in 49 approaching the junction. It was decided to make a grade-separated junction so that up (inbound) trains would cross over both the Midland and GNR lines further east on long lattice bridges, and then curve round and cross the Midland route a second time to join the GNR. The shorter down direction line followed the originally planned alignment, and made a sharp curve rising at 1 in 49.

Anderson observes that

Considering its meagre achievements, the 3 3/4 mile line was a very costly venture. Land itself was inexpensive and most of the [£250,000 construction cost] was spent on conquering the undulating terrain around Mapperley with 1,048 yd of tunnelling, numerous embankments and cuttings, and a dozen or more substantial bridges.

== Opening and early traffic ==
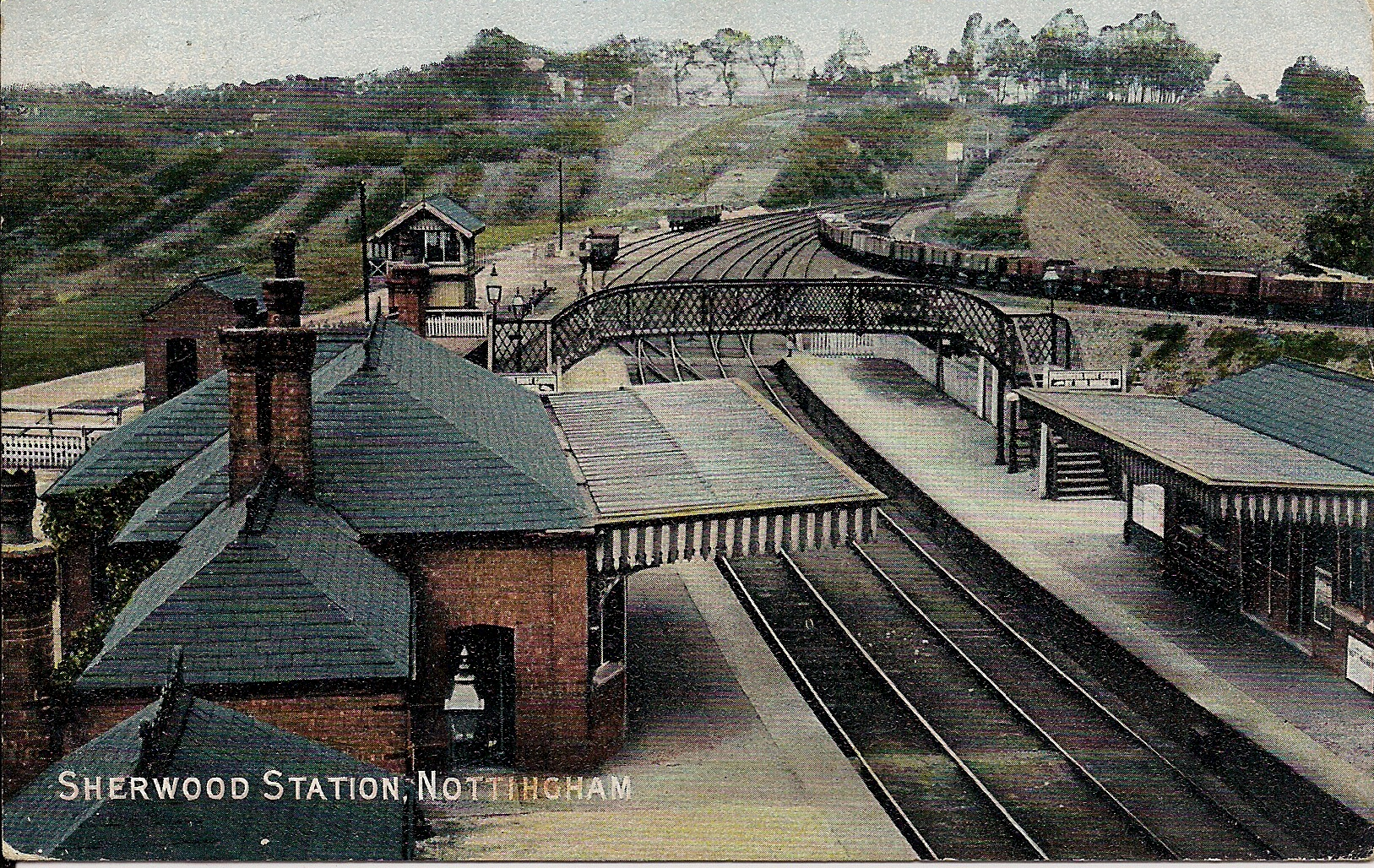
Sherwood railway station

The construction was complete in November 1889. Major General Hutchinson of the Board of Trade inspected the line on 22 November 1889 and was satisfied, and the line opened for ordinary traffic on 2 December 1889. The first train was delayed when the contractor's agent stopped it by standing on the line showing a red flag at Trent Lane Junction; the contractor Edwards claimed he was still in possession of the line, not having been paid fully, although the company had obtained an injunction forbidding this interference. After some discussion the train continued its journey.

From January 1890 there were ten passenger trains each northbound and nine southbound over the line, some of which worked to and from Newstead, the passenger extremity of the Leen Valley line at the time. The trains used the GNR London Road station at Nottingham. There was a Sunday service of four trains each way until 31 December 1889.

== Manchester, Sheffield and Lincolnshire Railway connection to Nottingham ==
If the future seemed rosy, Anderson provides a measured view of this achievement:

... even as the inaugural train climbed away from Trent Lane, construction work was in progress on the Manchester, Sheffield & Lincolnshire line to Annesley. By 1900 this new railway had been extended through Nottingham itself and as it provided the GNR with an even more convenient route to the west the majority of local services were diverted on to it. Overnight the Suburban route had lost its raison d'etre and, furthermore, what few customers its three stations had managed to attract were soon tempted away by electric trams which began to serve Sherwood in 1901.

On 2 January 1893 the Manchester, Sheffield and Lincolnshire Railway opened a line from Staveley to Annesley, joining the GNR Leen Valley Line at Newstead; this brought additional traffic to the GNR lines: the MS&LR ran a Sheffield to Nottingham passenger service of six trains a day, running over the Suburban Line to London Road. In the first few months (only) of 1893 the GNR ran a corresponding service from Nottingham to Staveley. (Note: The MS&LR and the GNR had agreed mutual running powers over these routes.)

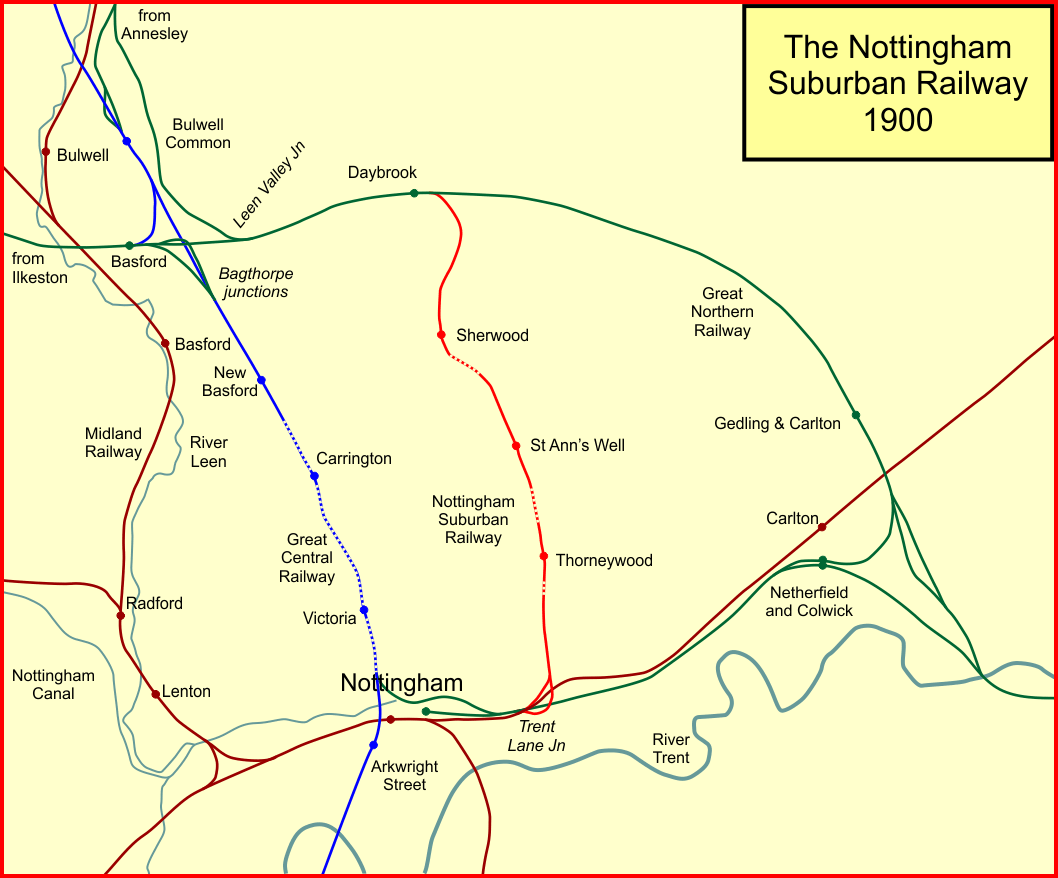
The Nottingham Suburban Railway in 1900

The Manchester, Sheffield and Lincolnshire Railway decided to build a London Extension from Annesley, passing through Nottingham, obtaining authority in the Manchester, Sheffield and Lincolnshire Railway (Extension to London, &c.) Act 1893 (56 & 57 Vict. c. i). The MS&LR changed its name to the Great Central Railway in 1897. After considerable negotiation, the Great Northern Railway and the Great Central Railway agreed to build jointly a new large passenger station in central Nottingham. This opened on 24 May 1900 and (later) became known as Nottingham Victoria station. The passenger service over the Nottingham Suburban line was diverted to that station.

== Tramway competition and loss of local passenger business ==
In 1901 electric trams started operation in Nottingham, and extensions to the network resulted in effective competition with the passenger traffic to the intermediate stations on the line, which declined sharply. By 1914 the majority of trains from Nottingham to Shirebrook using the Suburban Line ran non-stop to Daybrook, returning via the GCR line; a corresponding clockwise service ran.

On 13 July 1916 the intermediate stations, Thorneywood, St Ann's Well and Sherwood were closed and only two passenger trains operated to Shirebrook over the line, with no corresponding inward trains.

== Grouping of the railways and events to 1931 ==
The main line railway companies of Great Britain were merged into one or other of four new large companies in a process called the Grouping, mandated by the Railways Act 1921. The Nottingham Suburban Railway (as owner of the line) was absorbed into the new London and North Eastern Railway (LNER), and the Great Northern Railway was a constituent of it. The train service on the line continued at a low level. The process of absorption resulted in Suburban Railway shareholders receiving LNER stock of equal value to their own.

On the evening of 23 January 1925 a length of the Mapperley Tunnel, on the line from Colwick to Daybrook, collapsed, blocking the line. While repairs were being carried out the heavy GNR coal traffic from west and north of Nottingham was carried over the Nottingham Suburban Line, which required reversal in London Road yard.

On 10 July 1928 the King and Queen visited Sherwood for a ceremony involving 17,000 children. Sherwood and Thorneywood stations were reopened on that day to enable the children and others to travel to the event.

On 9 February 1930 the line was singled; only one passenger train used the line, and that ceased to operate after 14 September 1931.

== Closure ==
On 9 March 1941 an enemy bomb exploded on the line not far from Trent Lane Junction, severing the route there. By this time only Thorneywood had revenue traffic use, accessed from the Daybrook end, so it was decided not to reinstate the track, and the intermediate sidings were accessed from the Daybrook end only from that time. A short stub at Trent Lane was used as a wagon storage siding. Goods workings continued to serve the brickworks, and the oil storage depot at Thorneywood.

An enthusiasts' special train ran on 16 June 1951. The line closed altogether on 1 August 1951;

== Legacy ==
Much of the route has been obliterated by redevelopment, but some structures remained in 2019, including the brick arch bridge over Trent Lane that carried the up line at the grade-separated junction. The former station house at St Ann's Well was still extant in 2021, as is the station masters house at Thorneywood as a private dwelling.

== Topography ==
Locations:

- Trent Lane Junction; on GNR Nottingham to Grantham line;
- Sneinton Tunnel; 183 yards;
- Thorneywood station;
- Thorneywood Tunnel; 408 yards;
- St Ann's Well station;
- Sherwood Tunnel; 442 yards;
- Sherwood station;
- Ashwell's Tunnel; 70 yards;
- Daybrook junction; on Colwick to Kimberley line.
