= Drumclog (disambiguation) =

Drumclog is a hamlet in Scotland.

Drumclog may also refer to:

- Drumclog Moss, bog
- Battle of Drumclog, battle fought at the Drumclog bog
- Drumclog railway station, in South Lanarkshire, Scotland
