= Drumclog =

Village in South Lanarkshire, Scotland

Coordinates: 55.62450027°N 4.16179877°W

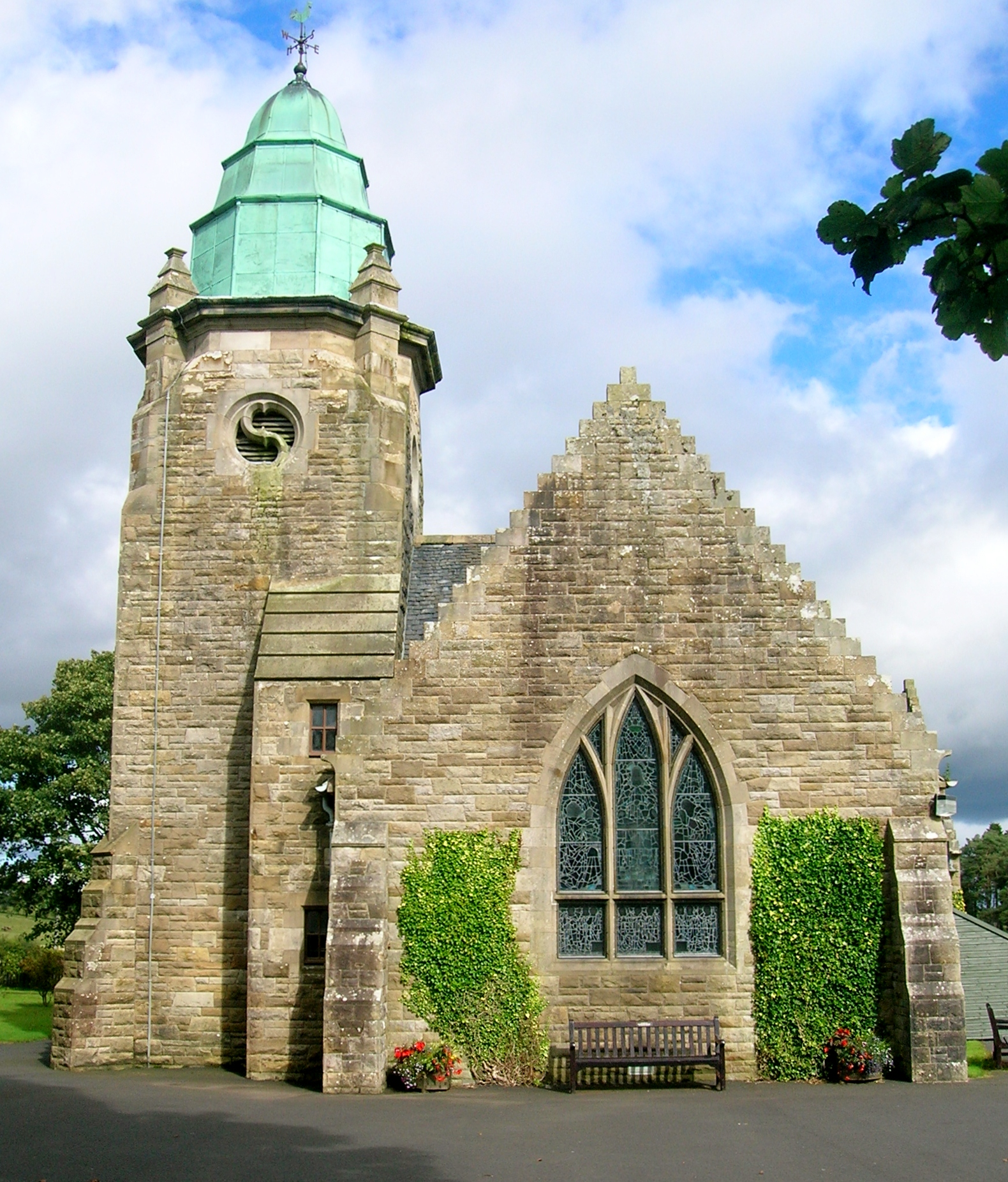
- Drumclog Memorial Kirk

- Location within South Lanarkshire
- OS grid reference: NS 6397 3888
- Council area: South Lanarkshire
- Country: Scotland
- Sovereign state: United Kingdom
- Post town: STRATHAVEN
- Postcode district: ML10
- Dialling code: 01357
- Police: Scotland
- Fire: Scottish
- Ambulance: Scottish

Drumclog is a small village in South Lanarkshire, Parish of Avendale and Drumclog, Scotland. The settlement is situated on the A71, between Caldermill and Priestland in East Ayrshire at an elevation of 197 metres (646 feet) and about five miles (eight kilometres) west of Strathaven.

== History ==
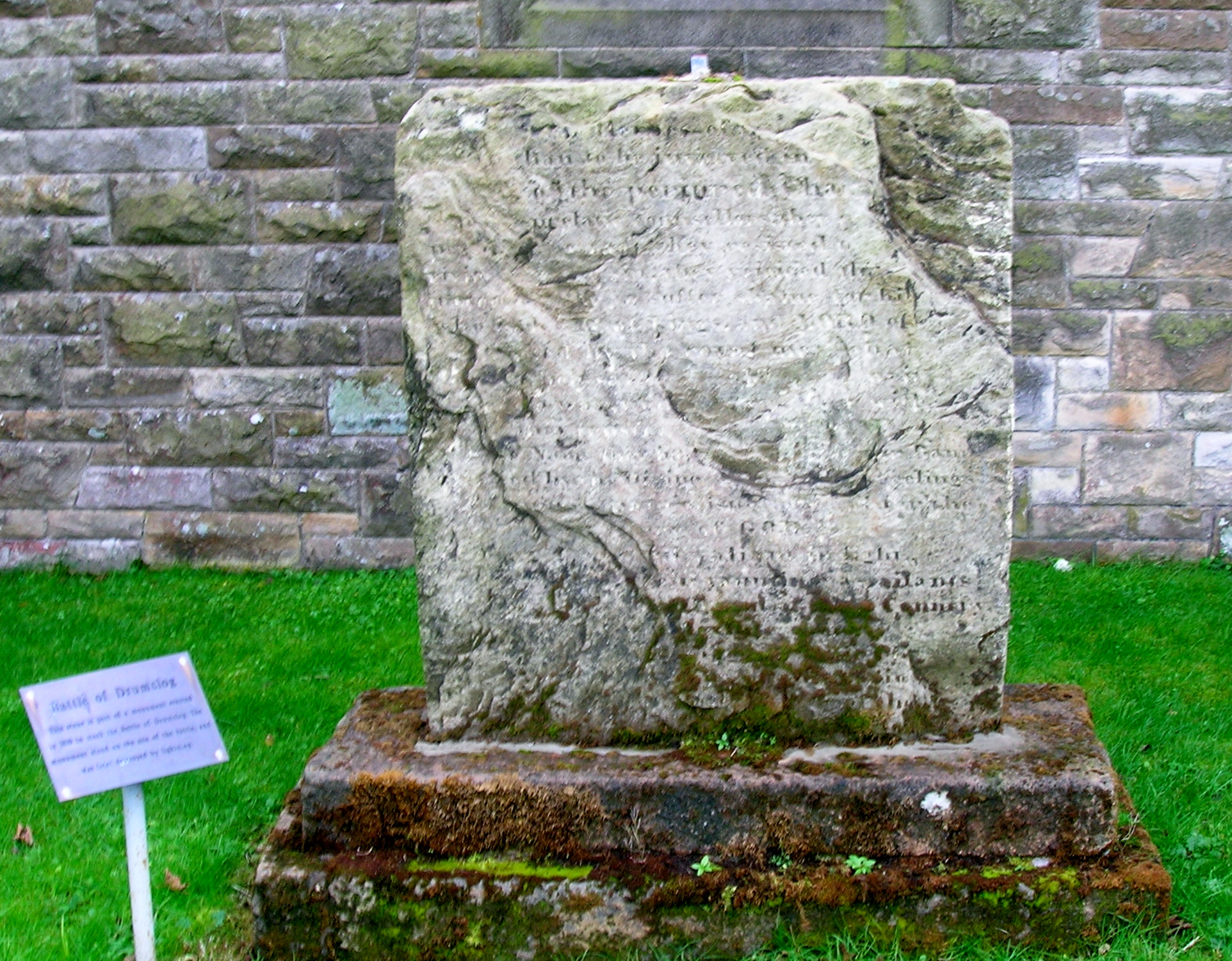
The original Battle of Drumclog memorial stone

Drumclog is best known as the site of the 1679 Battle of Drumclog that took place on Drumclog Moss in which the Covenanters defeated the King's Dragoons who were under the command of Claverhouse. The Lochgoin Covenanters Museum on Whitelee Moor in Fenwick Parish has displays and artifacts from the battle. A monument is located on the site of the battle. Thomas Carlyle visited the battlefield in April 1820 and wrote a description of the "flat wilderness of broken bog, a quagmire not to be trusted". At the nearby hamlet of Caldermill the Trumpeter's Well is located that is named after a government soldier who was killed and buried at the site in the aftermath of the battle.

Originally the village was a group of small farms however the opening of the railway in 1905 and the building of a substantial stone church in 1912 created a focus upon the area around Snabe and the habitation then formally achieved the status of a named village.

The post office has closed however the church remains in regular use (datum 2019).

=== Etymology ===
Drumclog may have Brittonic origins. The first part of the name may be the very common element *drum, indicating a place with "a back, a ridge", and the second element *clog, "a rock, a crag, a steep cliff" (Welsh drum-clog), in place names meaning a standing stone or other stones of perceived significance. The second part of the name could also be the cognate Gaelic element clach.

== Drumclog Memorial Kirk ==
This church was opened in 1912 and replaced a corrugated-iron church that had been built in 1901 to serve this remote location in Avendale and Drumclog Parish. It was designed by J McLellan Fairley in a Gothic-style with a square tower crowned with an octagonal copper covered spire. The title "Drumclog Memorial Kirk" was given in remembrance of the Battle of Drumclog that was fought nearby in 1679 when the Covenanters defeated Government troops. The original remembrance stone for this battle, damaged by a lightning strike, stands on the west side of the kirk. The stone's inscription reads "In commemoration of the victory obtained on this battlefield, on Sabbath the 11th June 1679, by our Covenanted forefathers over Graham of Claverhouse and his dragoons." A stained glass window of the battle is a further commemoration together with a replica of the Covenanter's Flag.

== Drumclog Memorial School ==
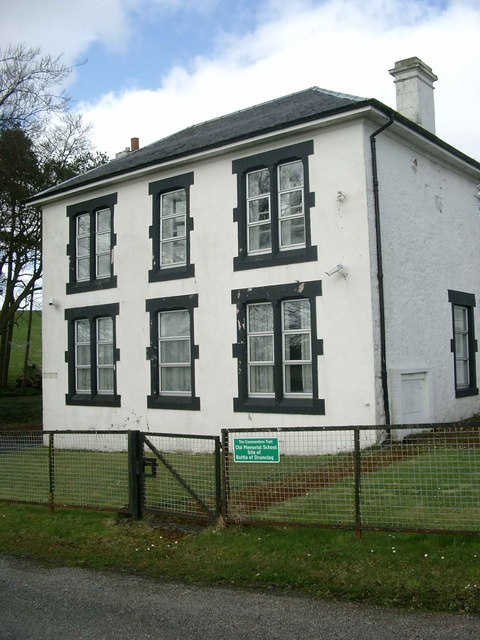
The old Drumclog Memorial School

The Old Memorial School was located away from the centre of the village in a location that was most convenient for the farms and their children. The plaque on the wall reads "On the battlefield of Drumclog, this Seminary of Education was erected, in memory of those Christian Heroes, who on Sabath the 1st of June 1679 nobly fought, in defence of Civil and Religious Liberty". The nearest primary school is now at Gilmourton.

== Drumclog railway station ==
Located at NS 63889 38645 next to the A71 this was a railway station on the Darvel and Strathaven Railway opened 4 July 1905 by the Caledonian Railway serving a rural area that included the village and farms in the rural area around Drumclog. The line had been intended as a through route between Lanarkshire and Ayrshire, however there was very little traffic along the route as the population in the area was very low. The station was closed from September until November 1909 and then again from January 1917 until December 1922. The last train ran on 10 September 1939, however the official closing date was two weeks later. Loudounhill railway station stood to the west and Ryeland railway station to the east. A photograph can be found at this site.

=== Cartographic evidence ===
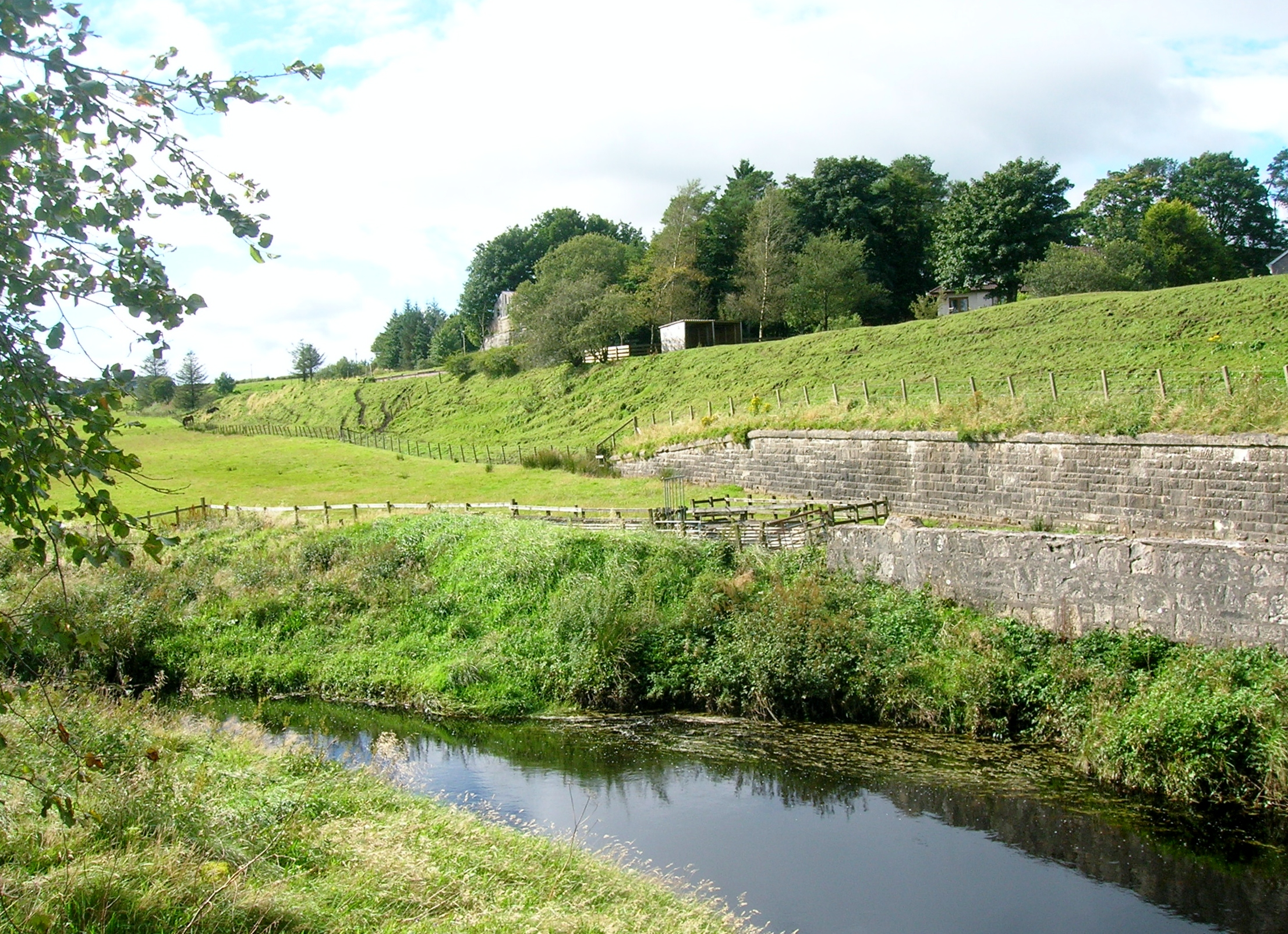
The site of Drumclog railway station.

Joan Blaeu's map based on that of Timothy Pont circa 1560 to 1614 shows an 'O. Drumclogs' and a 'N. Drumklog'. Adair's 1685 map shows Drumclog close to a track from Loudoun Hill to Renfrew. Hill of Drumclogg and Laigh Crumclogg are shown together some un-named buildings and with Snaid recorded on the predecessor to the A71, the Ayr to Edinburgh by Haamilton and Kirk of Shotts Road. Ross's 1773 map shows Drumclog to the north of the Ayr to Edinburgh road with the inaccurate note 'Clevers fought a battle 1684'. In 1816 Forrest's map shows East, High and Laigh Drumclog together with Snabe (sic). Both coal and limeworks are shown. In 1822 lime and coal works are still shown. The 1858 OS map shows old limestone quarries and a number of old limekilns. The 1911 OS map shows the presence of a post office, the church and Drumclog railway station. In 1958 the OS map shows the railway to have been closed and lifted.

== Archaeology ==
In 1803 a buried hoard of Roman coins was unearthed at North Torfoot Farm. In 1848 a Drumclog Tile Works was recorded.
