= Loudounhill railway station =

Former railway station in Scotland

Coordinates: 55.6082°N 4.2196°W

Loudounhill railway station Loudoun Hill

General information
- Location: Loudoun Hill, East Ayrshire; Scotland
- Platforms: 2

Other information
- Status: Disused

History
- Original company: Darvel and Strathaven Railway
- Pre-grouping: Glasgow and South Western Railway
- Post-grouping: London, Midland and Scottish Railway

Key dates
- 1 May 1905: opened
- January 1917: closed
- December 1922: reopened
- 11 September 1939: Officially closed to passengers and goods
Location

Loudounhill (NS 60268 37191) was a railway station on the Darvel and Strathaven Railway serving a rural area that included the landmark of Loudoun Hill in the Parish of Galston, East Ayrshire, Scotland.

== History ==
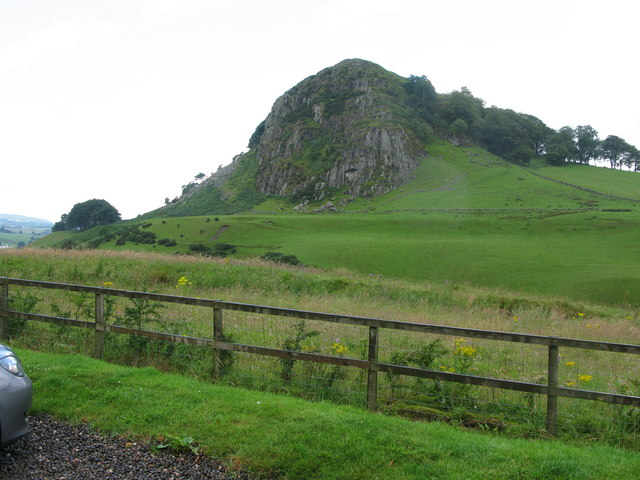
Loudoun Hill from near the site of the station

On 4 July 1905 the line opened, thereby connecting the Darvel Branch that ran from Kilmarnock, resulting in the line becoming a through route to Strathaven which was a line jointly run between the Glasgow and South Western Railway (G&SWR) and the Caledonian Railway (CR). The CR owned the Loudounhill to Strathaven section and the G&SWR owned the section from Loudounhill to Darvel and beyond.

Despite being a through route, no trains ran between Kilmarnock and Strathaven; instead, the two companies took it in turns to run the line between Darvel and Strathaven every six months. Stations were also located at Ryeland and Drumclog. The line was never successful and closed in 1939; the track was lifted in 1951.

The station had a signal box on the platform and a wooden waiting room and ticket office. The station had an island platform and a footbridge gave passengers access. A crane was present and several sidings with a goods yard and loading dock. The lengthy Loudounhill Viaduct lay to the south.

The junction between the Caledonian Railway and the Glasgow and South Western Railway was at the county boundary at Loudounhill Station. The closed line was used to store hundreds of damaged railway waggons that were awaiting repair.

The line had been intended as a through route between Lanarkshire and Ayrshire, but there was very little traffic along the route as the population in the area was very low. The station was closed from September until November 1909 and then again from January 1917 until December 1922. The last train ran on 10 September 1939, but the official closing date was two weeks later.

== Other stations ==
- Ryeland
- Drumclog

== Previous and next stations ==
Preceding station	Historical railways	Following station
Drumclog	Glasgow and South Western Railway / Caledonian Railway; Darvel and Strathaven Railway	Darvel
