= Ryeland railway station =

Former railway station in Scotland

Coordinates: 55.6383°N 4.1374°W

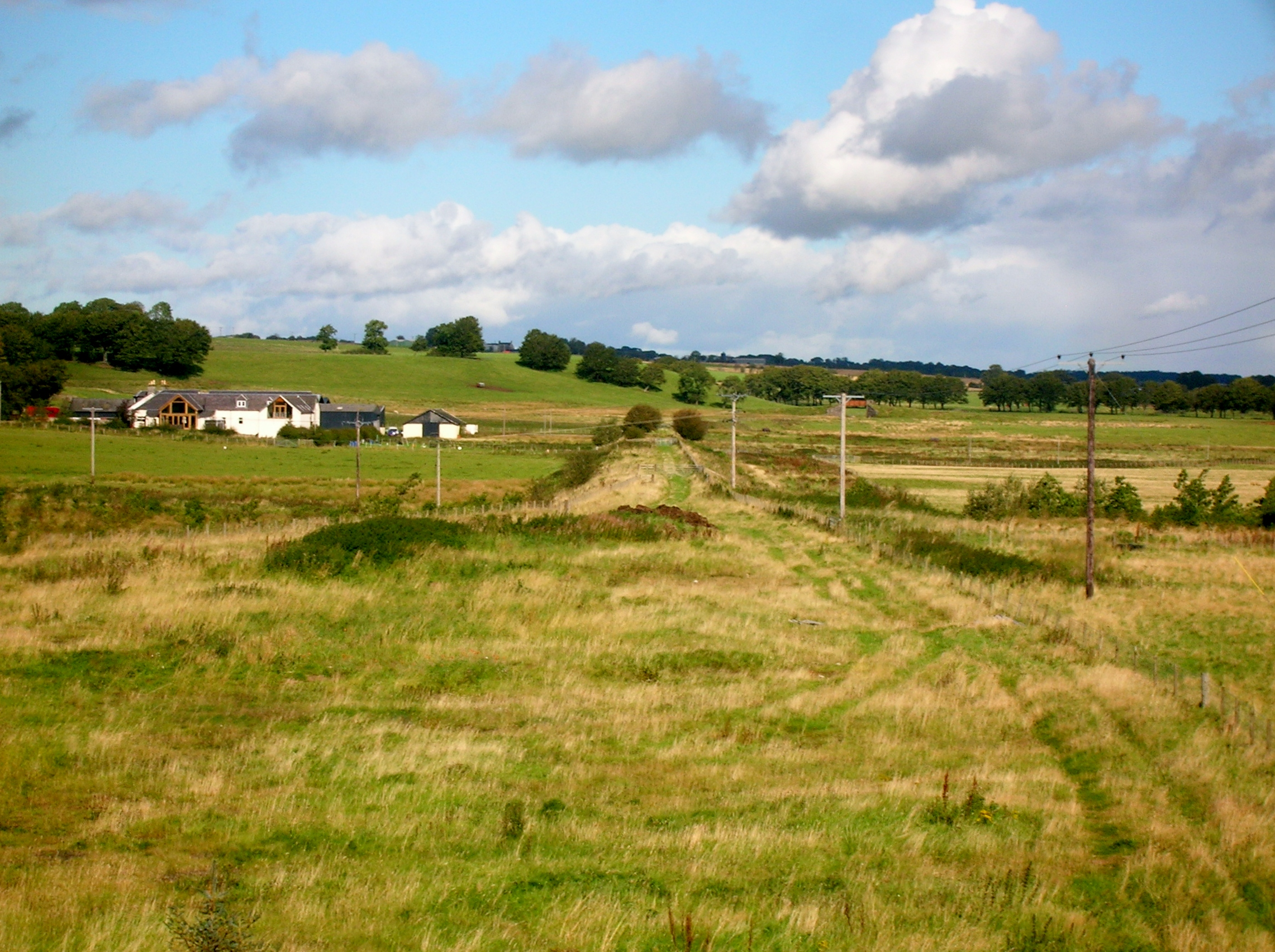
- The site of the station and goods yard

General information
- Location: Ryeland, South Lanarkshire; Scotland
- Platforms: 2

Other information
- Status: Disused

History
- Original company: Darvel and Strathaven Railway
- Pre-grouping: Glasgow and South Western Railway Caledonian Railway

Key dates
- 1 May 1905: opened
- January 1917: closed
- December 1922: reopened
- 11 September 1939: Officially closed to passengers and goods
Location

Ryeland (NS 65545 40364) was a railway station on the Darvel and Strathaven Railway serving Caldermill and the surrounding rural area in South Lanarkshire, Scotland.

== History ==
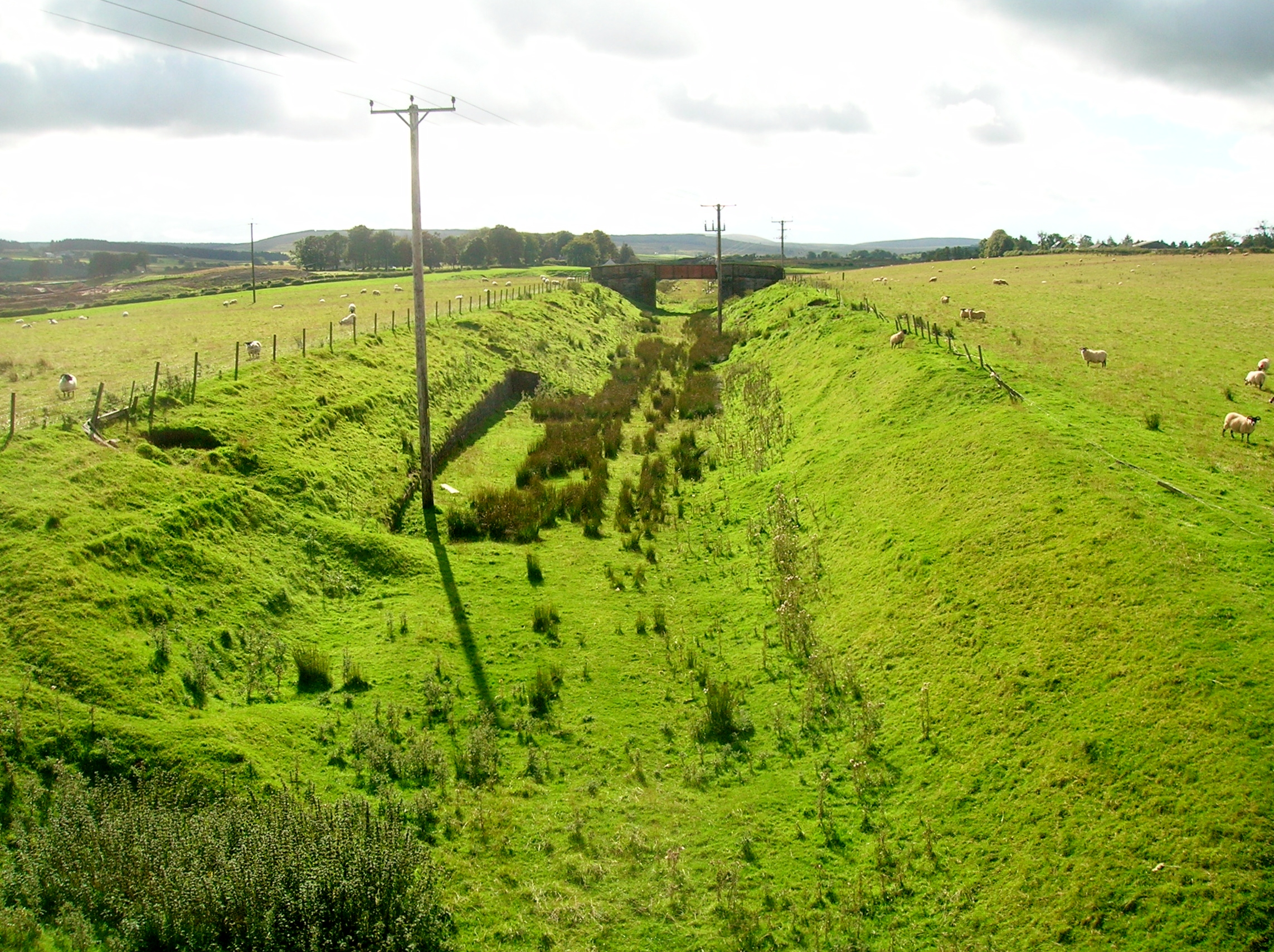
A view from the overbridge looking towards Drumclog.

On 4 July 1905 the line opened, thereby connecting the Darvel Branch that ran from Kilmarnock, resulting in the line becoming a through route to Strathaven which was a line jointly run between the Glasgow and South Western Railway (G&SWR) and the Caledonian Railway (CR). The CR owned the Loudounhill to Strathaven section and the G&SWR owned the section from Loudounhill to Darvel and beyond

Despite being a through route, no trains ran between Kilmarnock and Strathaven; instead, the two companies took it in turns to run the line between Darvel and Strathaven every six months. Stations were also located at Drumclog and Loudounhill. The line was never successful and closed in 1939 and the track lifted in 1951.

The station had a signal box on the platform and a wooden waiting room and ticket office. The station had an island platform and steps from the overbridge gave passengers access. Several sidings with a large goods shed were present. Ryelands Creamery was located nearby. The goods shed and creamery building were still present in 2012.

The nominal junction between the Caledonian Railway and the Glasgow and South Western Railway was at the county boundary at Loudounhill Station. The closed line was used to store hundreds of damaged railway waggons that were awaiting repair.

The line had been intended as a through route between Lanarkshire and Ayrshire, however there was very little traffic along the route as the population in the area was very low. The station was closed from September until November 1909 and then again from January 1917 until December 1922. As stated, the last train ran on 10 September 1939, however the official closing date was two weeks later.

== Other stations ==
- Strathaven
- Drumclog
- Loudounhill

== Previous and next stations ==
Preceding station	Historical railways	Following station
Strathaven Central	Glasgow and South Western Railway / Caledonian Railway; Darvel and Strathaven Railway	Drumclog
