= Riccarton and Craigie railway station =

Railway station in East Ayrshire, Scotland

Coordinates: 55.5965°N 4.4995°W

Riccarton and Craigie Riccarton
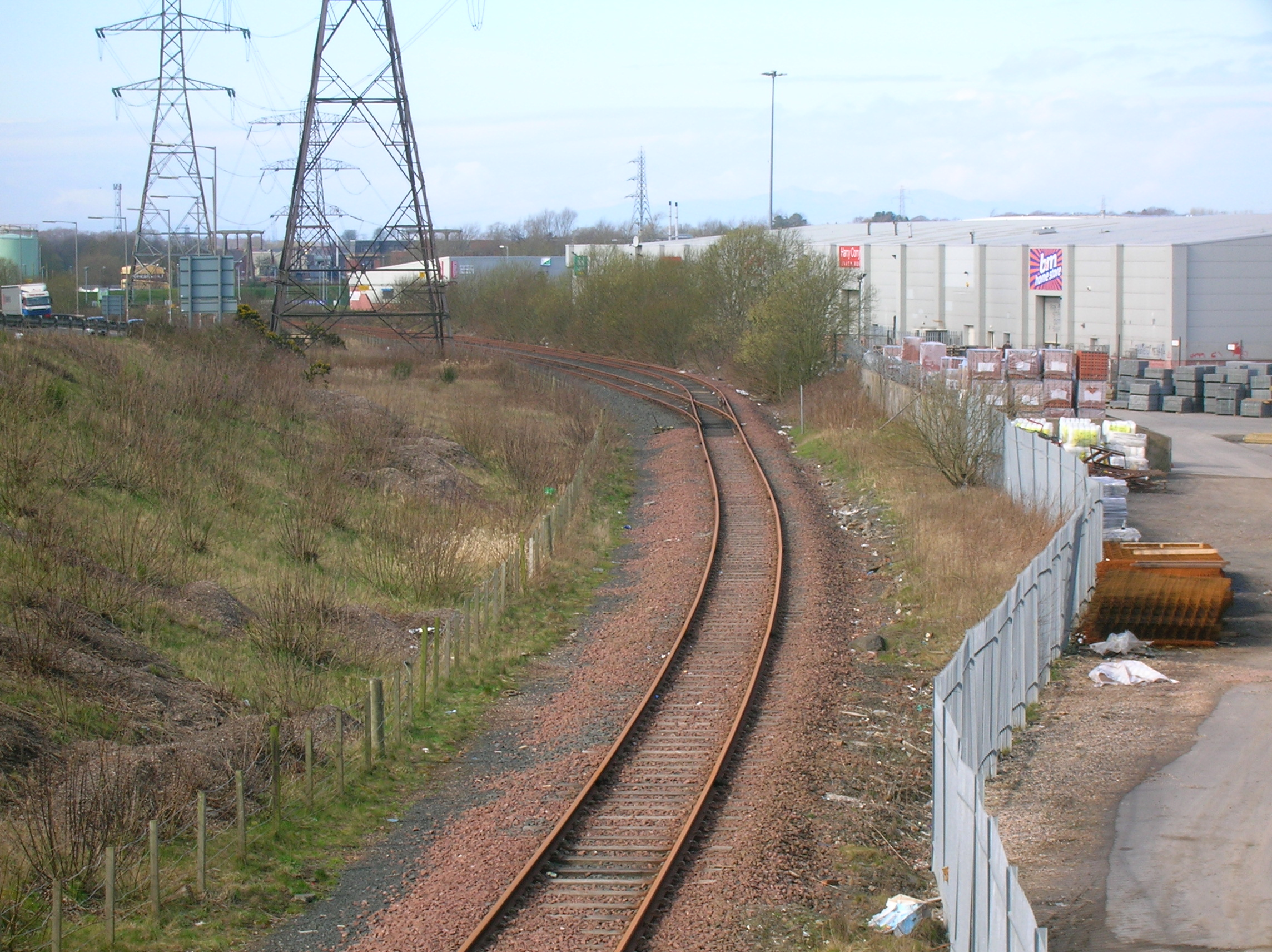
- The remaining section of the line.

General information
- Location: Riccarton, East Ayrshire; Scotland
- Platforms: 1

Other information
- Status: Disused

History
- Original company: Glasgow, Paisley, Kilmarnock and Ayr Railway
- Pre-grouping: Glasgow and South Western Railway

Key dates
- 5 July 1965: Officially closed
Location

Riccarton and Craigie was an unopened railway station serving the village of Riccarton and the distant hamlet of Craigie, both in East Ayrshire, Scotland. Built in 1902 and originally just called Riccarton, it was renamed in 1905.

== History ==
The village of Riccarton near Kilmarnock had a railway station by this name on the Gatehead and Hurlford branch of the Glasgow and South Western Railway. Part of the line remained open to supply a Hurst Fuels Depot in Kilmarnock that has now closed (datum June 2021), the track in the old station area was however lifted in the 1970s when Kilmarnock's Power Station closed. The remains of the station with its island platform and bricked up entrance from the street were extant until the building of the new Kilmarnock bypass removed all traces in the 1980s.

The station was built on the embankment just to the west of Campbell Street, but never opened for regular services; the double track line from Gatehead to Hurlford was officially open on 14 July 1902. and officially closed on 5 July 1965. The line never had a publicly advertised passenger service and a goods yard stood where the Hurst Fuels Depot was built in the 1970s. The signalbox at Riccarton & Craigie closed on 30 June 1938 when the line ceased to be a through route, possibly replaced by a ground frame.

The route was used by excursion and relief trains, including services between Kilmarnock and Ayr until closure as a through route on 27 June 1938. In 1932 the main Glasgow - Ayr line was cut by a subsidence at the Irvine Viaduct and as a result trains between Glasgow and Ayr not calling at Paisley were for a time diverted via Barrhead, Kilmarnock and Riccarton and Craigie.

It is listed in 1929 as 'Riccarton and Craigie' by the London, Midland and Scottish Railway, one of the stations which the company conveyed goods to. The G&SWR operated a goods station at Riccarton and Craigie (Goods) which in 1910 had a substantial goods shed and associated crane and weighing machine. It is recorded as being closed officially on 5 July 1965.

Kay Park Junction was opened in 1904 as a spur to the Hurlford - Gatehead line. The signal box was still in use in 1962 for the trains running to the sidings surviving several industrial companies works.

The 1902 1 inch to a mile OS map (sheet 22) and the 1920s OS map, show the station as being open to passengers.

== Services ==
The Working Timetable for October 1909 shows a 'Saturday's Only' passenger train that was due into Kilmarnock at 5.42pm, running from Ayr at 5pm via Riccarton. The 12.50pm Goods from Ayr to Kilmarnock called at Riccarton to detach traffic and also a Tuesdays only goods from Hurlford to Gatehead via Riccarton and return to Darvel.

== Appearance ==
The 1938 Ordnance Survey map shows an island platform with a semaphore signal positioned close to the bridge over the road to the east. Stairs ran up to the platform from the ground level pavement beneath the railway overbridge.

== Sources ==
- Butt, R. V. J. (October 1995). The Directory of Railway Stations: details every public and private passenger station, halt, platform and stopping place, past and present (1st ed.). Sparkford: Patrick Stephens Ltd. ISBN 978-1-85260-508-7. OCLC 60251199. OL 11956311M.
- Jowett, Alan (March 1989). Jowett's Railway Atlas of Great Britain and Ireland: From Pre-Grouping to the Present Day (1st ed.). Sparkford: Patrick Stephens Ltd. ISBN 978-1-85260-086-0. OCLC 22311137.
- Blane, Robert (2014). The Riccarton Branch - an Industrial railway in Kilmarnock. Sou' West. Autumn 2014.
- Burgess, Max (2014). Letters to the Editor - The Riccarton Branch. Sou' West. Winter 2014/2015.
- Thomas, John (1971). A Regional History of the Railways of Great Britain. V.6, Scotland. David & Charles : Newton Abbot. ISBN 0-7153-5408-6.

== Previous and next stations ==
Preceding station	Historical railways	Following station
Gatehead; Line open; station closed	Glasgow and South Western Railway; Glasgow, Paisley, Kilmarnock and Ayr Railway	Kilmarnock
Galston; Line and station closed	Glasgow and South Western Railway; Darvel Branch	Kilmarnock
