= Caldermill =

Coordinates: 55.64°N 04.13°W

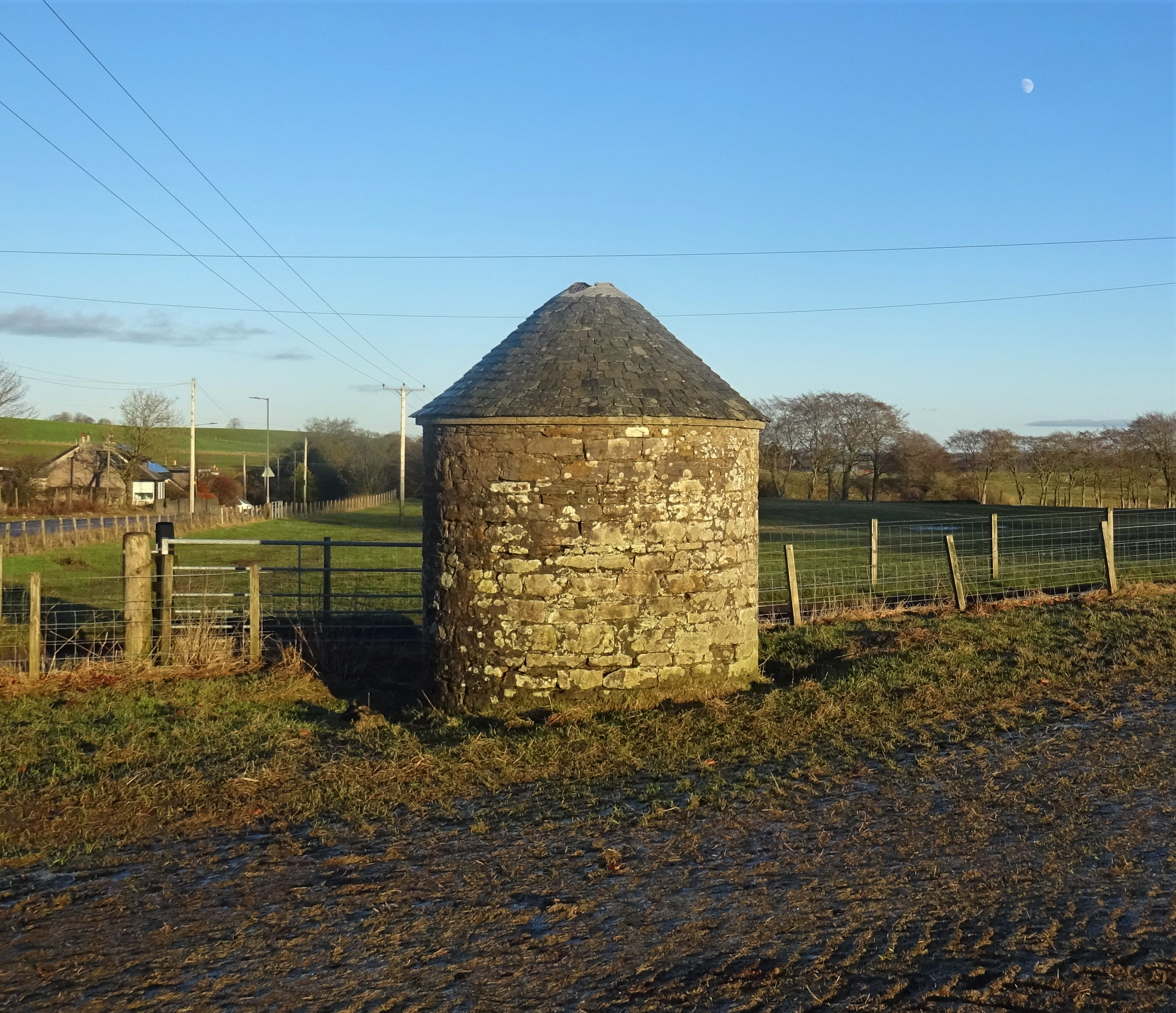
- The Trumpeter's Well and Calderbank

- Location within South Lanarkshire
- OS grid reference: NS6641
- Council area: South Lanarkshire
- Lieutenancy area: Lanarkshire
- Country: Scotland
- Sovereign state: United Kingdom
- Post town: STRATHAVEN
- Postcode district: ML10
- Dialling code: 01357
- Police: Scotland
- Fire: Scottish
- Ambulance: Scottish
- UK Parliament: East Kilbride and Strathaven
- Scottish Parliament: Clydesdale

Caldermill is a small settlement in South Lanarkshire, Scotland.

Caldermill is 3 miles (5 km) south-west of Strathaven, and is the next settlement a driver will come across after leaving Strathaven on the A71 westbound towards Kilmarnock. It is a hamlet of just a few houses. For children raised in Caldermill, the closest primary school is Gilmourton Primary, in the nearby hamlet of Drumclog, which is 2 miles (3 km) further along the A71 towards Kilmarnock. The nearest high school is Strathaven Academy, located in the town of Strathaven.

== History ==
The name of the settlement means 'hazel stream' in Gaelic. It was linked with the covenanters during the so-called 'Killing Times'. The Trumpeter's Well linked to the 1679 Battle of Drumclog stands beside the entrance to Hillhead Farm off the A71. By 1858 a group of four dwellings was named as Calderbank on the north side of the main road and a building is shown to the west of Calder Mill. By 1896 one of the Calderbank buildings is shown as a smithy and the building close to the mill had been re-modelled as a farm. In 1909 a post office is shown next to the smithy and a horse trough stands opposite. A later OS map shows a telephone call box at the post office with the smithy no longer marked. The Caldermill Farm buildings next to the old Calder Mill are shown as greatly enlarged in the mid-20th century. The farm of Calderbraehead is recorded in the OS Name book for the period 1858 to 1861 as being occupied by William Wiseman and at the time it was the property of the Duke of Hamilton.

=== Calder Mill ===
The mid-18th century map by William Roy does not name the mill; however, a building marked next to the mill lade running from the Calder Water is clearly shown. Calder Bridge is drawn and Hillhead Farm is shown.

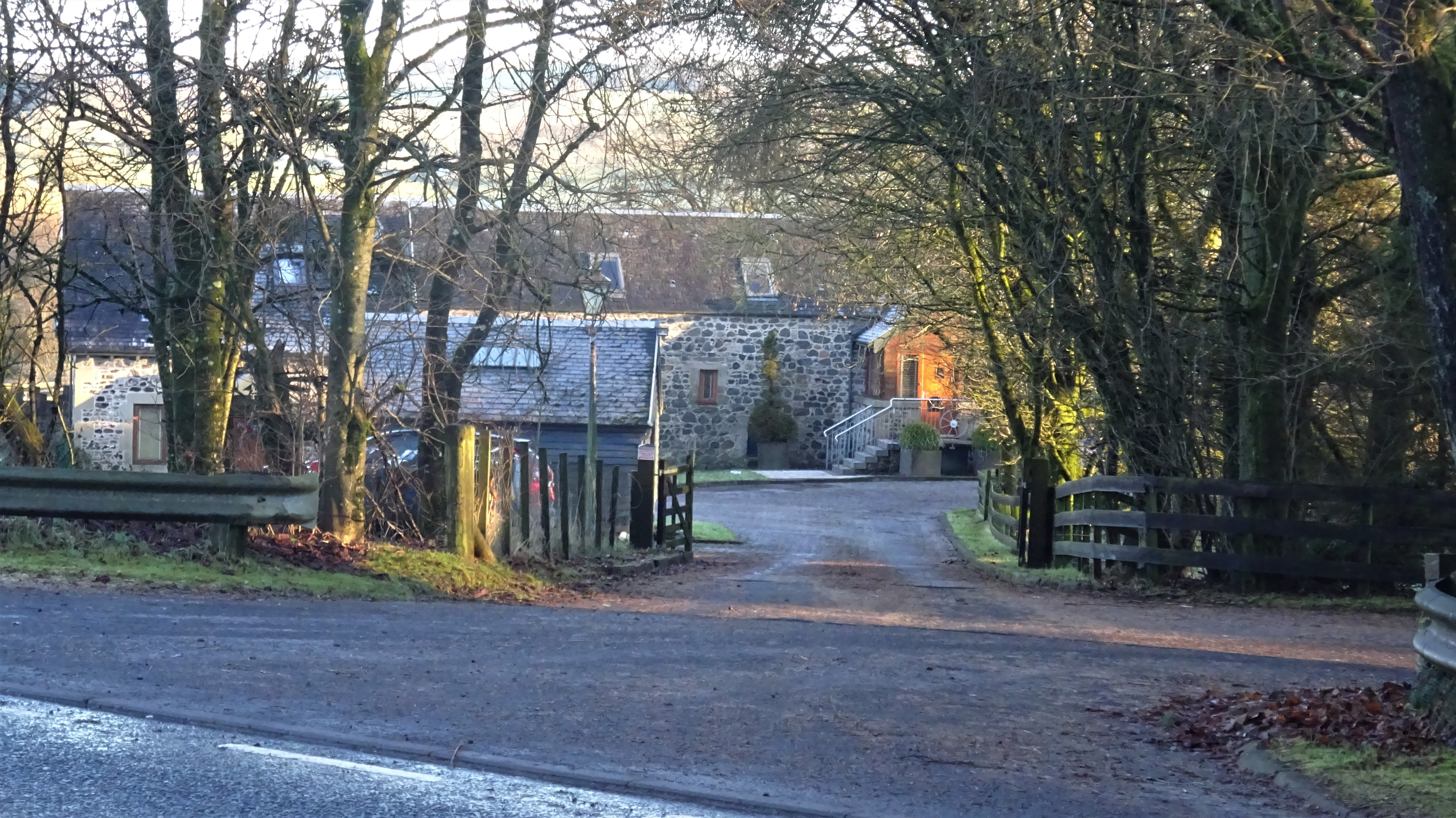
Calder Mill

The mill is shown in 1776 on the Taylor and Skinner survey of road. Calder Mill is indicated by a waterwheel symbol in the early 19th century.

The 1858 OS map records Calder Mill as a corn mill and a mill pond is shown on the north side of the main road with a dam on the Calder Water partly diverting the current down the lade towards the mill.

The OS Name Book records in the period 1858 to 1861 that the Corn Mill was occupied by John Barr and was the property of Thomas Allison of Strawfrank in Carstairs.

In 1909 Calder Mill's mill pond is shown as abandoned and the route of the tail race of the lade to the Calder Water is not marked although the mill is still recorded as a corn mill.

A 2005 photograph shows the old mill as a ruin (datum 2023), but it has since been restored as a private dwelling. In 2022 the site of the mill pond remains as a flooded area next to the old access road to the abandoned Calder Bridge. In the mid-20th century the mill is not shown as an operational corn mill.

The mill had an overshot waterwheel and there was a grain kiln with two sets of millstones for general grinding and for producing oatmeal. The last miller was John McStrovock who died in January 1946, the mill having ceased operation in 1945. An earlier miller was William McKenzie.

=== Calder Bridge ===
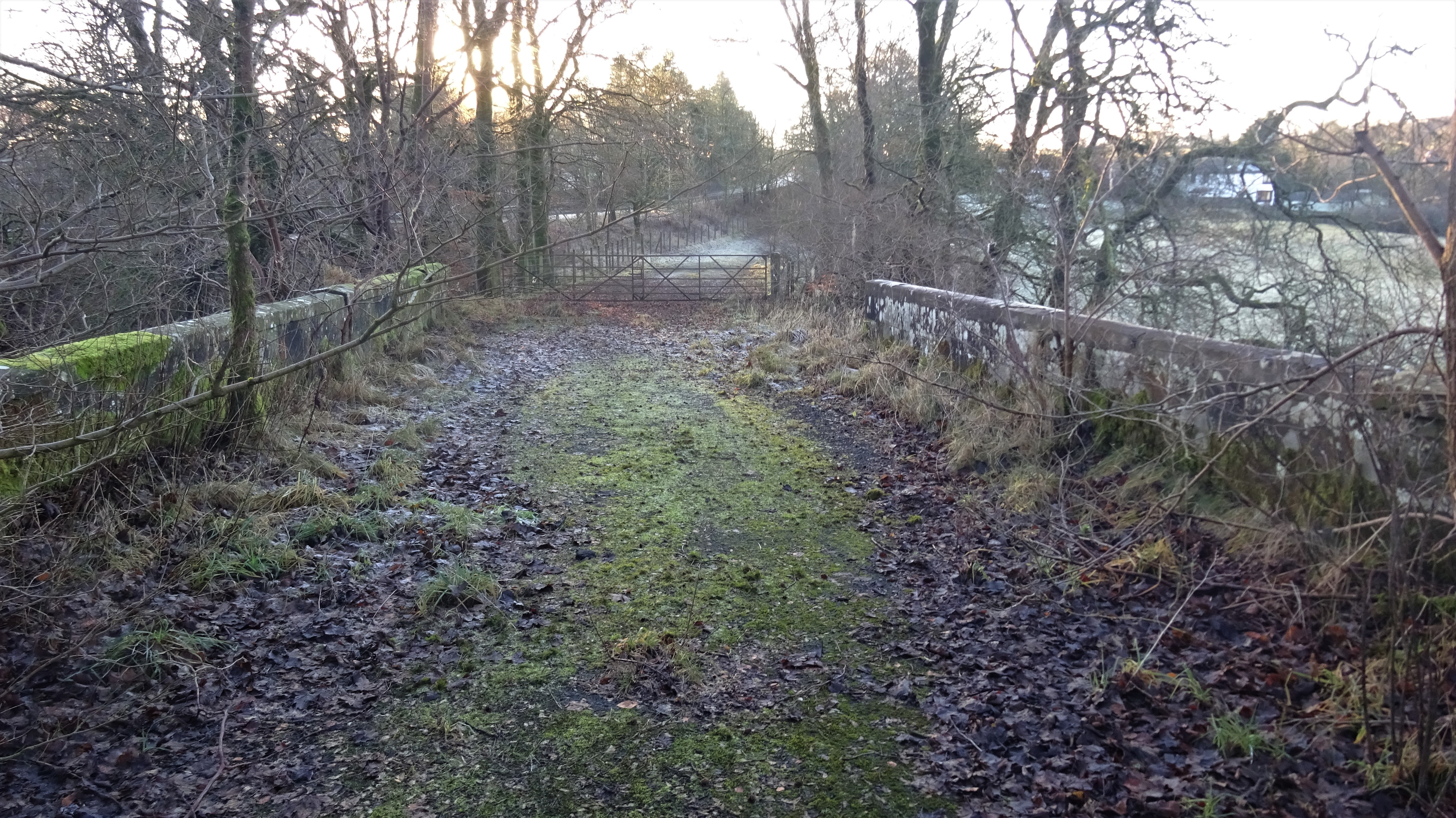
Old Calder Bridge road

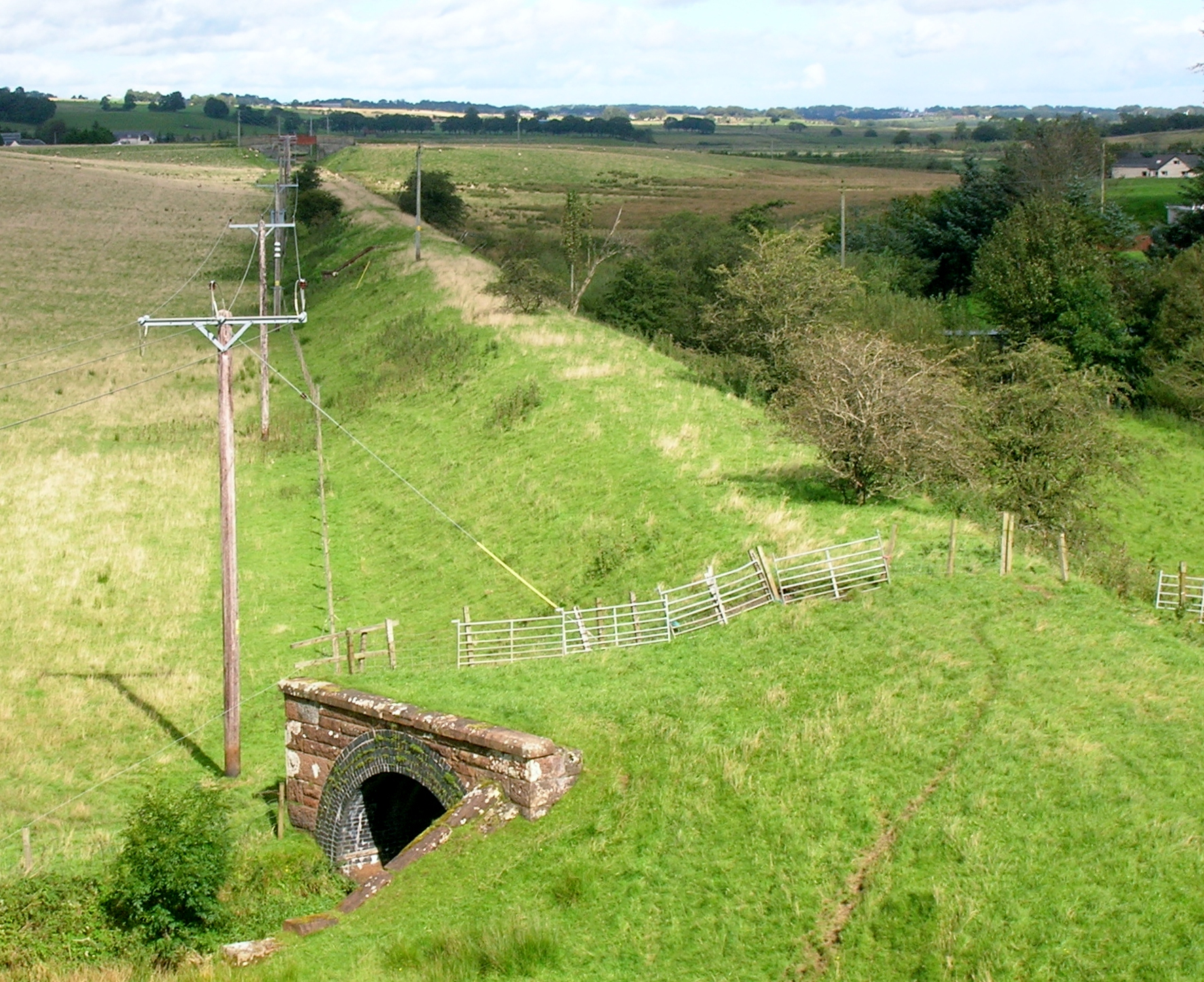
Old track formation looking towards Ryeland

The old Calder Brig or Bridge is Category B Listed and crosses the Calder Water and is dated 1829, with Thomas Telford and Henry Welch as architects. It has a single semi-circular span and is built of ashlar and parapet coping. The abutments are splayed and sloping. A date stone with 'Built by Wm Brownlie,' a Strathaven mason, is set in a rectangular panel over the keystone on the southern side. The bridge has been replaced by a wider concrete bridge with a new alignment through the settlement.

== Transport ==
The Darvel and Strathaven Railway ran near to Caldermill; however, the nearest station was at Ryeland with passenger trains running to Strathaven and Darvel from 1905 to 1939 with WWI closure between 1917 and 1922.
