= Trumpeter's Well =

Coordinates: 55°39′0″N 4°7′50″W

The Trumpeter's Well at Caldermill in South Lanarkshire, Scotland is recorded as the site of the death of a government trumpeter or cornet who was killed in the aftermath of the 1679 Battle of Drumclog, at which the Covenanters were victorious.

Location of the Trumpeter's Well, South Lanarkshire

== Introduction ==
The Category C Listed Trumpeter's Well is located in the hamlet of Caldermill (NS 66013 41683) in a field beside the entrance drive to Hillhead Farm, on the A71 route to Strathaven from Darvel, Parish of Avondale, South Lanarkshire. The site lies about 3 miles away from the site of the Battle of Drumclog.

== Description ==
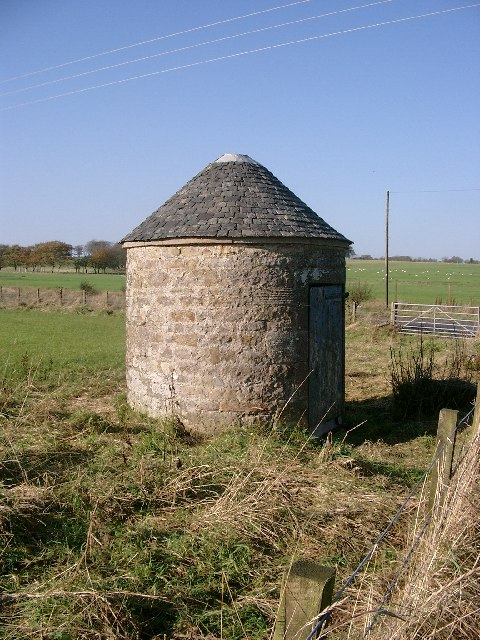
The Trumpeter's Well

In 1858 the Trumpeter's Well had been infilled, but was traditionally associated with the death of a trumpeter whose burial site was still pointed out. The well head is stone lined and protected by a professionally built 9' high circular stone rubble building with a concical slated roof and a wooden door with an ashlar surround, once again in use in 1966, the water from it supplying nearby Hillhead Farm. The building probably dates from the early 19th century.

In 1851-1861 the spot where he was buried was still known locally, but there was no appearance of a grave. Lidar images do however show depressions in the field lying close to the well house.

== History ==
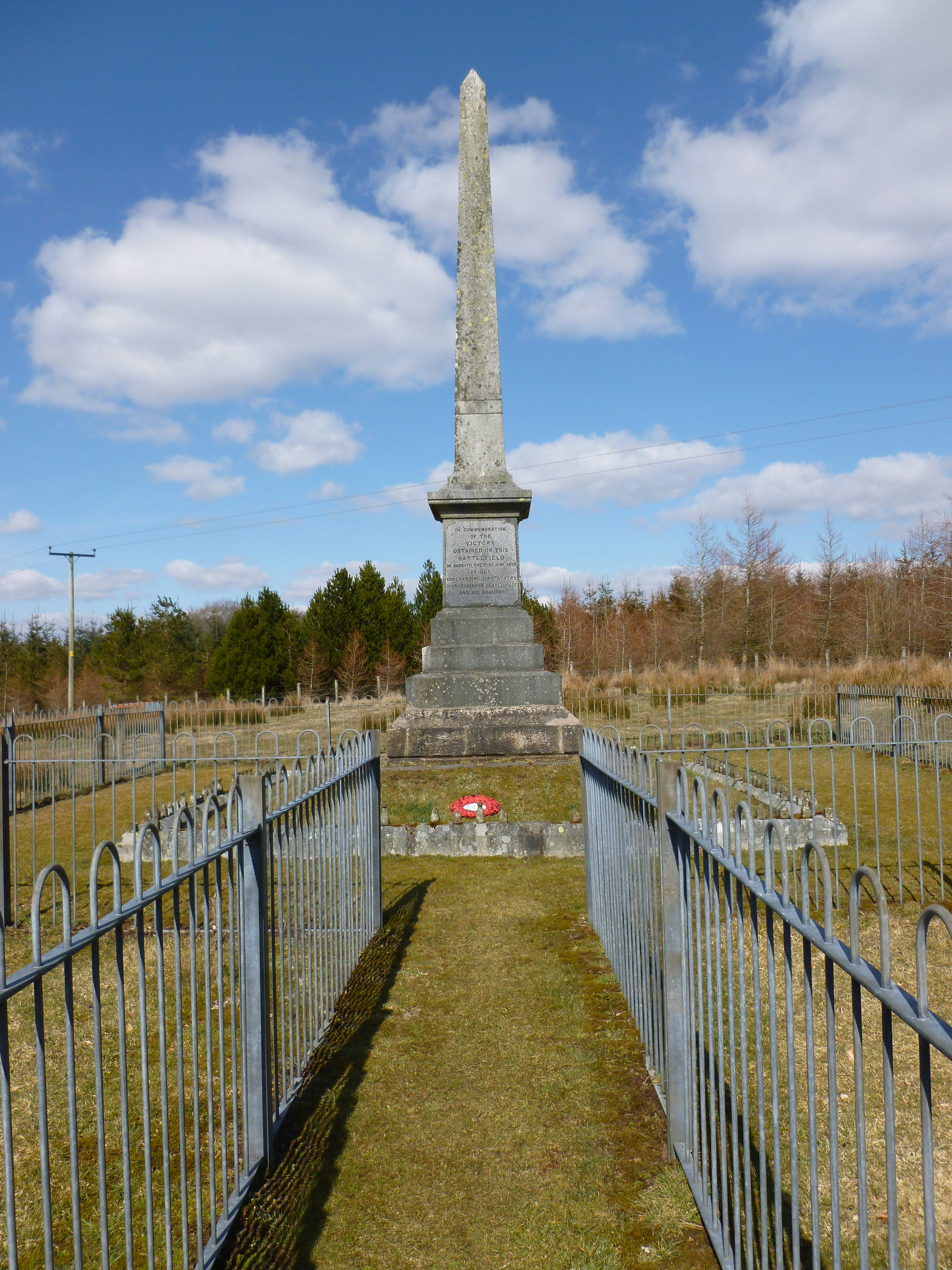
Memorial at the site of the Battle of Drumclog

During the covenanting period there was a battle in 1679 near the village of Drumclog following an illegal religious meeting known as a conventicle that was held in this isolated moorland site. Graham of Claverhouse, later Viscount Dundee, was the leader of the government troops and during the Battle of Drumclog, Thomas Finlay, a farmer who had attended the meeting, stabbed Claverhouse's horse with his pike, severely injuring it. 'Bloody Clavers', as the covenanters called him, was able to force his mount on until he encountered his trumpeter and took this boy's horse from him to secure his own escape. This trumpeter is said to have been a boy of around 14 years of age who was subsequently caught at Caldermill, killed by the covenanters and his body was thrown into the well that lay close to the road. Subsequently, it seems to have been removed and buried nearby.

Some reports indicate that other government dragoons attempting to escape the battle ground were also killed nearby and buried here, possibly in a mass grave.

The OS Name Book gives a twist on the story, stating that in 1851–1861, tradition stated that the Trumpeter was killed here while his horse was drinking at the well. At the time of the OS visit Hillhead Farm was owned and occupied by Joseph Allison.

A further element of confusion is that the cornet to Claverhouse was in common parlance a 'trumpeter' and is said to have been killed in the battle:

"The Rebels upon Captain Graham's Approach, sent out Two Parties to skirmish with him, which he beat into their main Body. Then they advanced with their whole Force upon him, who after a considerable Slaughter of the Rebels, and the Loss of his Cornet, Two Brigadiers, about Eight Horse, and Twenty Dragoons, (his own Horse being killed under him, and mounting another)...."

Scotlands Places records details given by Sheriff Aiton of a skirmish at a dwelling, now demolished, known as Capernaum near Drumclog Bridge:

"The Covenanters pursued the Troops to Calder Water about 3 miles from the field of Action. A person of the name Findlay from Lesmahagow armed with a pitchfork came up with Captain Graham at a place called "Capernaum" near Coldwakening and would probably have killed that officer had not another of the Covenanters called to Findlay to strike at the Horse and thereby secure both it and the rider. The blow intended for the Captain was spent upon his mare and the Captain escaped by mounting with great agility the horse of his trumpeter who was killed by the Whigs."

== See also ==
- Lady's Well, Auchmannoch
- Hallhill Covenanter Martyrs Memorial
