= Battle of Drumclog =

Battle of the Covenanter rebellion of 1679

Coordinates: 55.63168°N 4.18459°W

- Part of the Covenanter rebellion of 1679
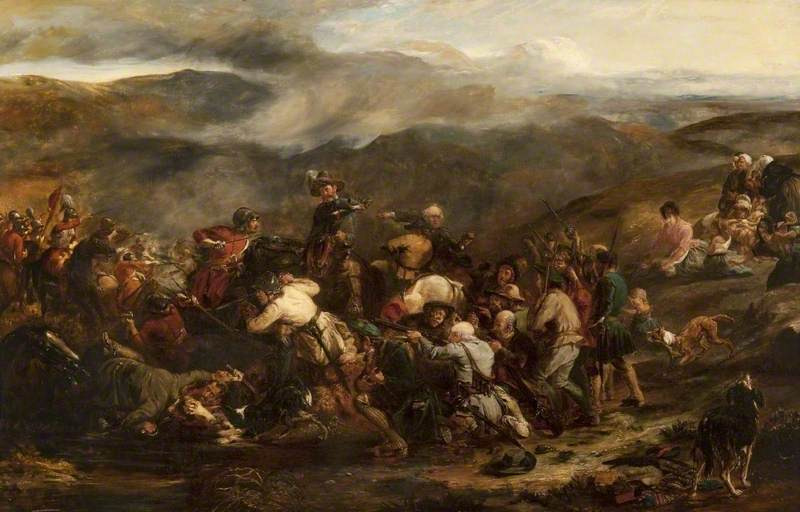
- 1836 painting of the battle
Date	1 June 1679
Location	Drumclog, South Lanarkshire
Result	Covenanter victory

Belligerents
Covenanter rebels	Scotland

Commanders and leaders
William Cleland	John Graham

Strength
200	Unknown

Casualties and losses
Unknown	36 killed

Registered battlefield
- Designated: 30 November 2011
- Reference no.: BTL21

The Battle of Drumclog was fought on 1 June 1679 during the Covenanter rebellion of 1679. Rebel Covenanters defeated a Scots Army force under John Graham of Claverhouse at Drumclog, South Lanarkshire.

== Background ==
Following the assassination of Archbishop James Sharp on Magus Muir and the Declaration of Rutherglen, the Covenanters were on the verge of open rebellion. A large conventicle was planned to take place at Loudoun Hill, on the boundary of Ayrshire and Lanarkshire, in defiance of government persecution of the Covenanters. On the morning of Sunday 1 June, the Rev. Thomas Douglas allegedly broke off his sermon with the words "Ye have got the theory, now for the practice", when it was reported that Scots Army dragoons under John Graham of Claverhouse were heading to the area. Claverhouse, better known to his enemies as "Bluidy Clavers", had recently been appointed captain, with a mission to disperse conventicles in south west Scotland.

== Battle ==
A group of around 200 armed Covenanters moved east, to a boggy moor near the farm of Drumclog, starting the Covenanter rebellion of 1679. With about 40 mounted men, and armed with muskets and pitchforks, the Covenanter force was no rabble. Commanded by Robert Hamilton, the army took up a strong position behind a bog, or 'stank'. Claverhouse's force arrived, but were unable to engage the enemy directly due to the ground conditions. For some time groups of skirmishers exchanged fire across the stank, and Claverhouse felt he was gaining the upper hand. However, he was still unable to get his troops close to the Covenanters without becoming bogged down.

At this point, the Covenanters decided to press the attack. William Cleland led a force around the stank, and advanced rapidly. Despite heavy fire from the government troops, the attack was entirely successful. The line of Claverhouse's force broke, and the dragoons were soon routed from the battlefield, leaving 36 dead.

== Aftermath ==
The victory was a huge success for the rebellious Covenanters, although euphoria was short lived. Just three weeks later Claverhouse, under the leadership of the Duke of Monmouth, helped to crush the rebellion at the Battle of Bothwell Bridge. In the aftermath of the battle a trumpeter fleeing the battle is said to have been caught and killed by covenanters at Caldermill and the Trumpeter's Well named in his memory. A dubious account of the battle, attributed to the Laird of Torfoot allegedly written by Thomas Brownlee of the Covenanter army, was published in 1822. This followed a fictionalised version which appeared in Sir Walter Scott's novel Old Mortality in 1816. The battle is also remembered in a Child Ballad Loudoun Hill, or Drumclog. Claverhouse himself also left an account of the battle.

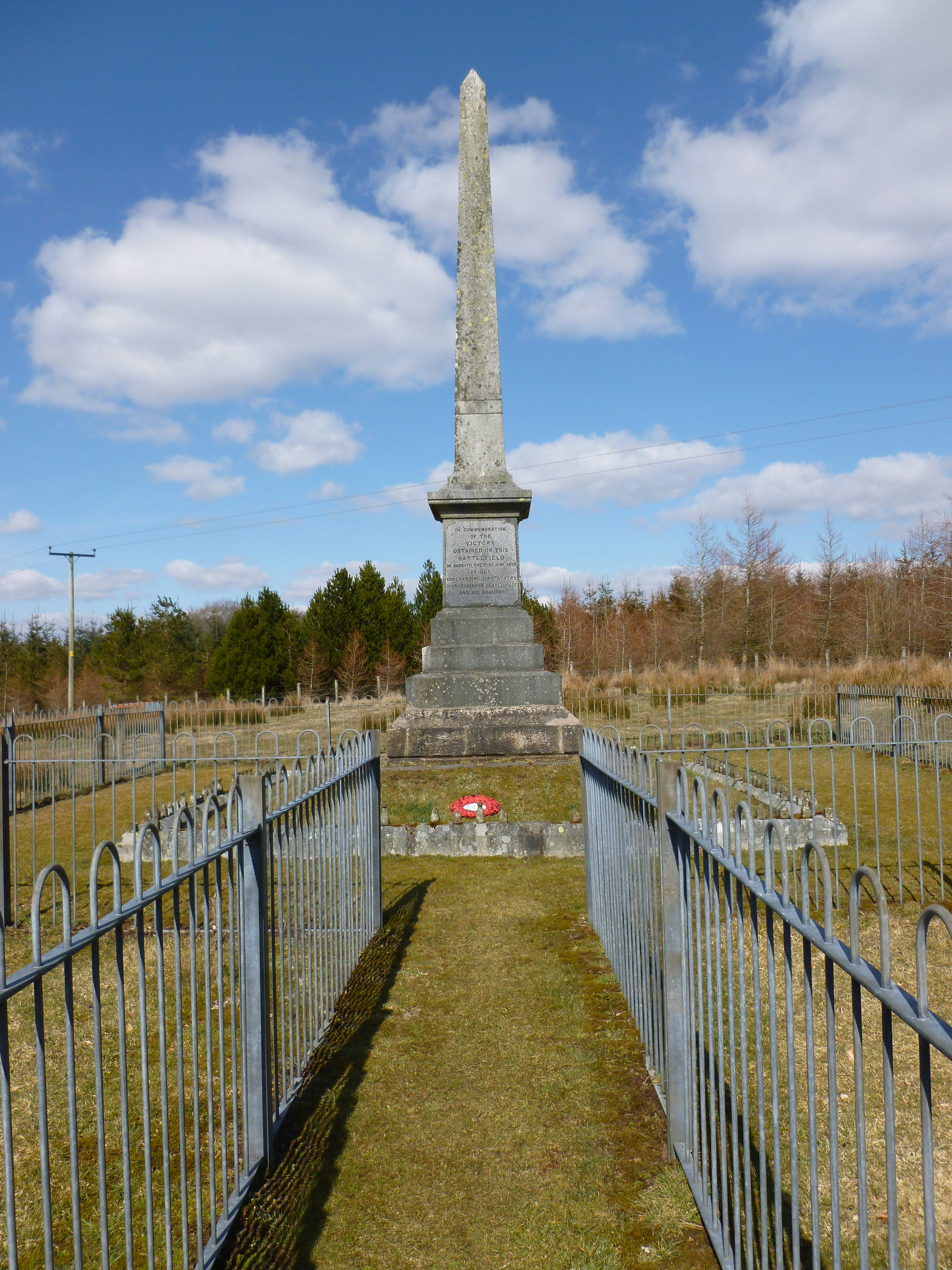
Monument to the battle

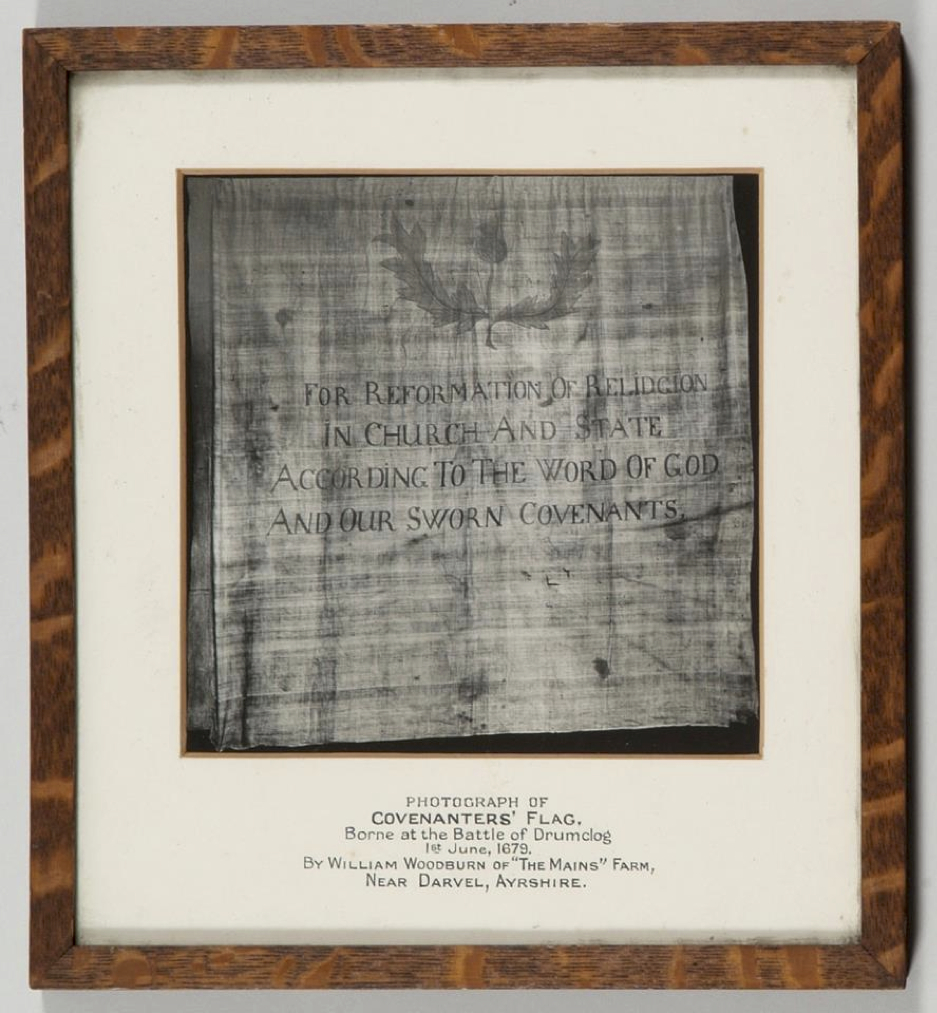
Covenanters' Flag flown during the battle

The Battle is celebrated by some in Scotland as a victory for religious freedom. In 1839 a monument was erected on the site of the battle, and in 1859 a school house was erected nearby. This monument was struck by lightning and the current monument was built to replace it in 1867. The battlefield has been inventoried and protected by Historic Scotland under the Scottish Historical Environment Policy of 2009.

The Boston Church in Duns, in the Scottish Borders, had a bell named in memory of the battle. The church was demolished in the 1950s, but the bell is preserved on the site. In 1905 the Darvel and Strathaven Railway opened, with a station at Drumclog, 1.2 miles (1.9 km) south west of the battle site. By 1912 the village which had grown up here required a church, and the Drumclog Memorial Kirk was constructed. Inside the kirk, located on the A71 Edinburgh to Kilmarnock road, is a stained glass window depicting the Covenanters, and a painting of the Covenanters' army standard. The kirk holds an annual memorial service on the first Sunday in June, at the Drumclog Monument.

The Covenanters' flag from this battle at Drumclog now resides in a museum in Scotland. Under a Scottish thistle the flag says, "For Reformation of Religion In Church And State According To The Word Of God And Our Sworn Covenants."

== Bibliography ==
- W. Aiton's History of the Rencounter at Drumclog (Hamilton, 1821)
- vol vii., pp. 221–226, of Hill Burton's History of Scotland (ed. 1876)
- vol. i., p. 178, of Carlyle's Reminiscences (1881).

== See also ==
- River Irvine - Death on the River Irvine
- David Hackston
- Henderson, Thomas Finlayson (1895). "Nimmo, James". In Lee, Sidney (ed.). Dictionary of National Biography. Vol. 41. London: Smith, Elder & Co.
- John Nisbet
- John Welsh of Irongray

More Brownlee versions:

- Battle of Drumclog – via Wikisource.
- Narrative of the Battles of Drumclog, and Bothwell Bridge (1828) – via Wikisource.
- Narrative of the battles of Drumclog, and Bothwell Bridge (2)/The Battle of Drumclog – via Wikisource.
