= Barleith railway station =

Disused railway station in Ayrshire, Scotland

Barleith

General information
- Location: Near Hurlford, Ayrshire; Scotland
- Coordinates: 55.593°N 4.450°W
- Platforms: 1

Other information
- Status: Disused

History
- Original company: Glasgow and South Western Railway
- Pre-grouping: Glasgow and South Western Railway
- Post-grouping: LMS

Key dates
- pre 1904: Opened
- 1944: Renamed Barleith Halt
- January 1954: Renamed Barleith
- 6 April 1964: Closed
Location

Barleith railway station was a railway station near Hurlford, East Ayrshire, Scotland. The station was built by the Glasgow and South Western Railway on their Darvel Branch line.

== History ==
The station was opened some time before 1904. It was renamed Barleith Halt in 1944, but was renamed back to Barleith in January 1954. The station closed permanently to passengers on 6 April 1964.

Preceding station	Historical railways	Following station
Galston; Line and station closed	Glasgow and South Western Railway; Darvel Branch	Hurlford; Line and station closed
