= Hallhill Covenanter Martyrs Memorial =

Memorial in Dumfries and Galloway, Scotland

Coordinates: 55°05′59″N 003°42′36″W

The Hallhill Covenanter Martyrs Memorial at Irongray (NX 910797) near Kirkpatrick Irongray Church in the old county of Kirkcudbrightshire, now Dumfries and Galloway, is the site of the deaths and burials of Covenanters Edward Gordon and Alexander McCubbin.

Location of the Hallhill Covenanters Memorial

== Introduction ==
The site of the hangings lies on the lands of Hallhill Farm or at the time Haughill House in Irongray, then a mansion-house, close to Kirkpatrick Irongray church and next to the River Cruden at the eastern end of Glencairn.

== Description of the memorial and site ==
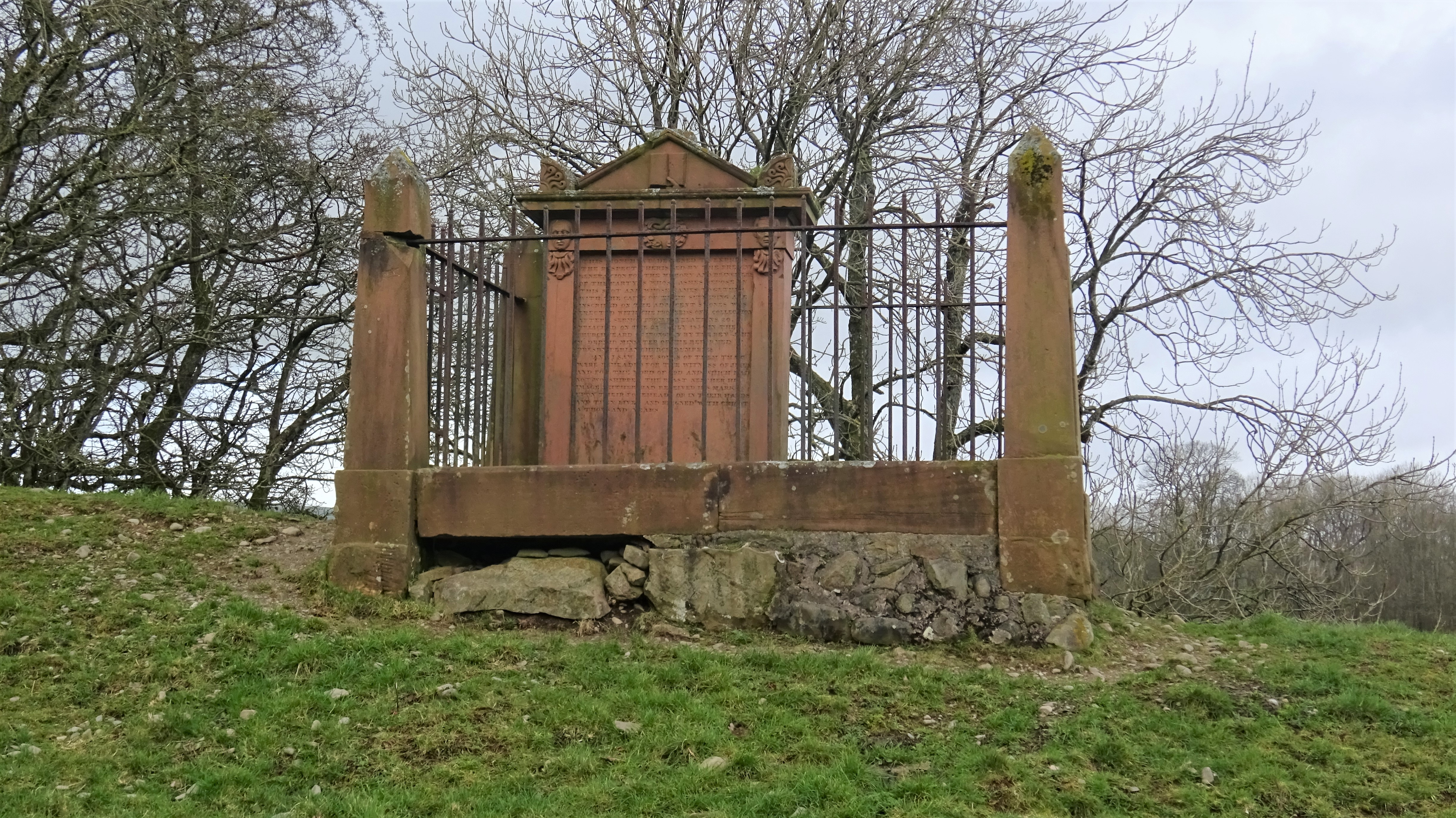
The Hallhill Covenanter Martyrs Memorial

The memorial stands on a low ridge which was once a copse of oaks, hazels and apple trees. It is unclear where the bodies, or ashes as stated on the 1832 stone, were buried. After their executions the bodies were left exposed for a time on the oak tree, a dule tree, on which they were hanged, as a warning to others. The remains, possibly as ashes, were eventually buried beneath or near the oak tree.

A memorial stone with a detailed inscription was carved in the 18th century, circa 1702 to 1714, and was enclosed by iron railings with red sandstone corner pillars in 1832, when a new vertical gravestone with a finial and carvings of the martyrs faces was put alongside the old memorial stone, which lies horizontally.

The site is Category B Listed.

== The execution ==
The Covenanters Edward Gordon and Alexander MacCubbin lived in Glencairn. They were captured by Captain Sir Andrew Bruce of Earlshall on 11 February 1685, and after a few days brought to this site on Hallhill Farm where they were hanged from an oak tree on 3 March 1685. They had been taken prisoner with four others at Lochenkeit in the parish of Kirkpatrick Durham and four of the group were executed soon after capture.

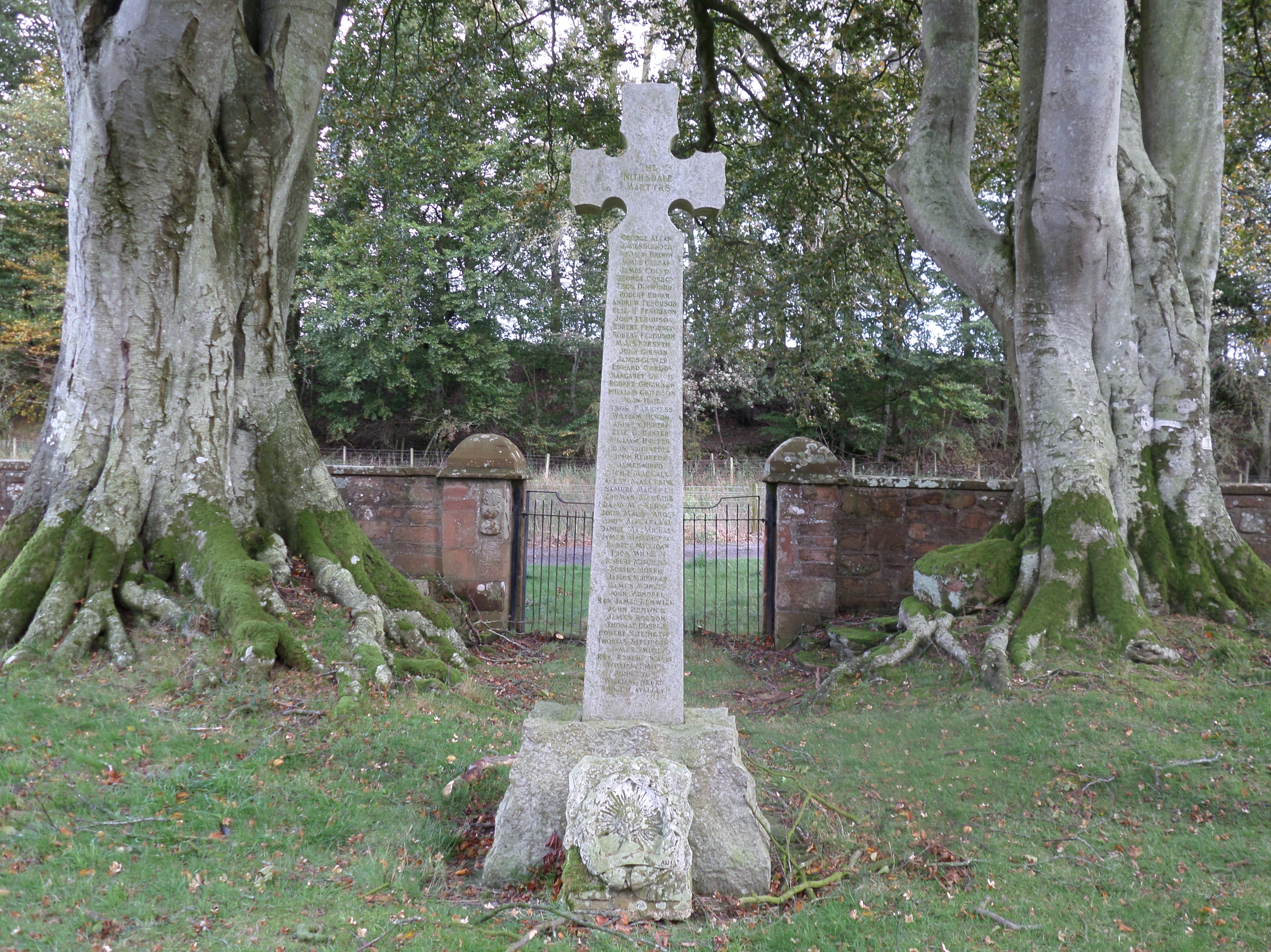
The Nithsdale Martyrs Cross at Dalgarnock near Thirnhill

The Grierson of Lag, known as 'Cruel Lag', had been active in requiring those living in the area to take the Abjuration Oath and Captain Bruce brought Edward and Alexander before him, pressing for an assize to be arranged to try them. 'Monsterous Lag' would have none of it, although Bruce managed to stall the executions for a day.

Captain Andrew Bruce of Earshall had gained the name 'Bloody Bruce,' as recorded on the older gravestone, by hacking off the hands and head of Covenanter Richard Cameron after defeating the Covenanters at the Battle of Airds Moss in 1680 during the so-called 'Killing Times'. He was a colleague and lieutenant of 'Bloody Clavers', John Graham of Claverhouse.

Alexander was permitted to send a message to his wife saying that he "left her and the two babes upon the Lord, to His promise." The hangman asked for forgiveness and Alexander replied "Poor man, I forgive thee, and all men; thou hast a miserable calling upon earth."

They were then executed without trial and are said to have died with "Much composure and cheerfulness." The oak from which they were hanged is said never again to have produced a single leaf. The Lady of Haughill House [sic] gave her scarf to bind the eyes of the victims and for this act of kindness she was condemned to spend seven years in exile in the colonies. The ship transporting her was caught in a violent storm near the coast of Virginia and was lost; however, she clung to a cask and survived, returning to the Irongray area after the Revolution.

Edward and Alexander are recorded on the Martyr's Cross at Dalgarnock near Dumfries where all 57 Nithsdale Covenanter martyrs are commemorated.

=== Inscriptions ===
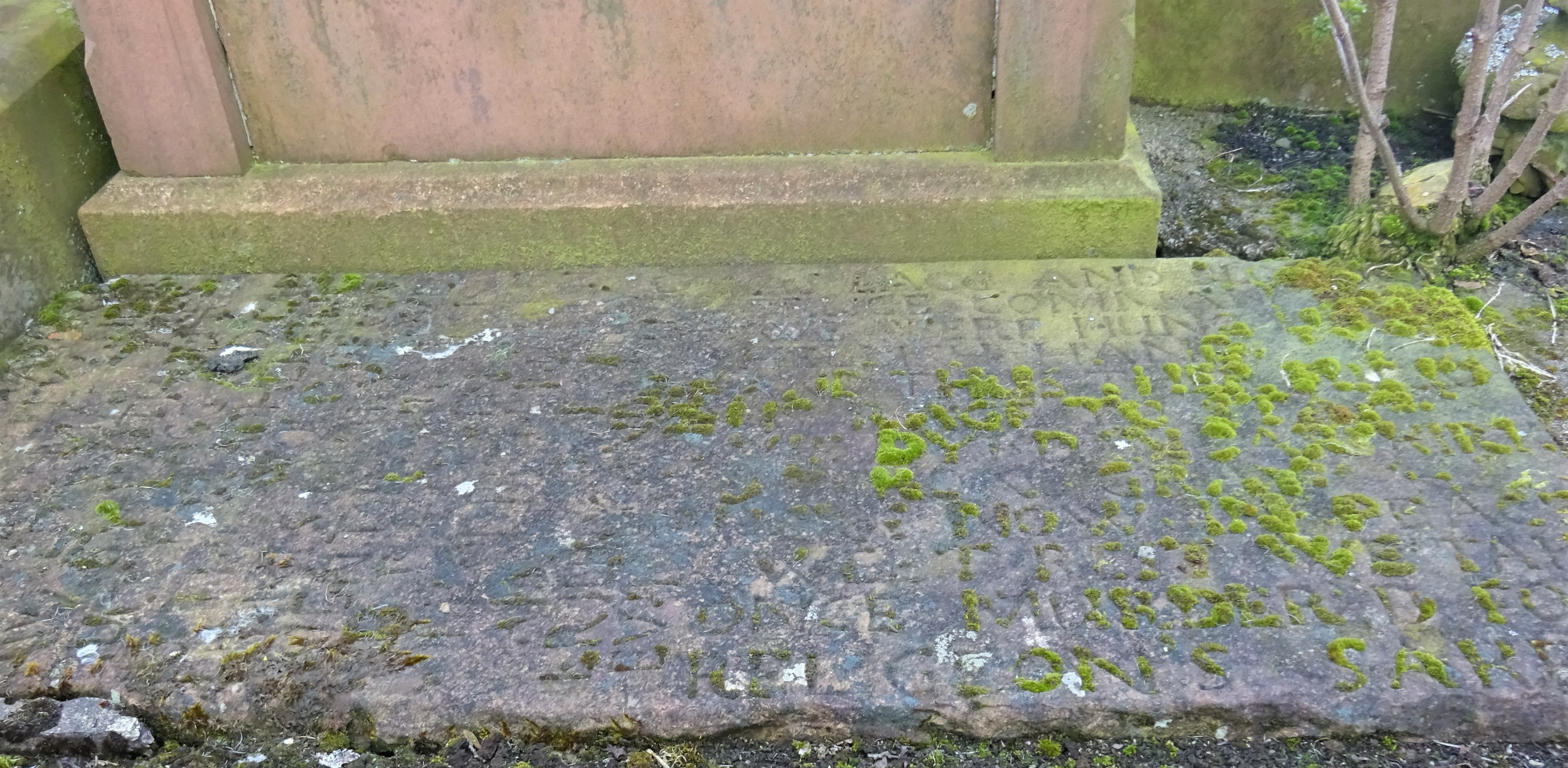
The 18th century memorial inscription

The inscription on the original 18th century horizontal stone reads:

HERE LYES EDWARD GORDON AND ALEXANDER M'CUBINE MARTYRES HANGED WITHOUT LAW BY LAGG AND CAP. BRUCE FOR ADHEREING

TO THE WORD OF GOD, CHRISTS KINGLY GOVERMENT IN HIS HOUS AND THE COVENANTED WORK OF REFORMATION AGAINST TYRANNY PERJURY AND PRELACY REV XII. 12.11, MAR 3 1685.

AS LAGG AND BLOODIE BRUCE COMMAND WE WERE HUNG UP BY HELLISH HAND AND THUS THER FURUS RAGE TO STAY WE DYED NEAR KIRK OF IRON GRAY - HERE NOW IN PEACE SWEET REST WE TAKE ONCE MURDER'D FOR RELIGEON'S SAKE.

The inscription on the upright 19th century stone reads:

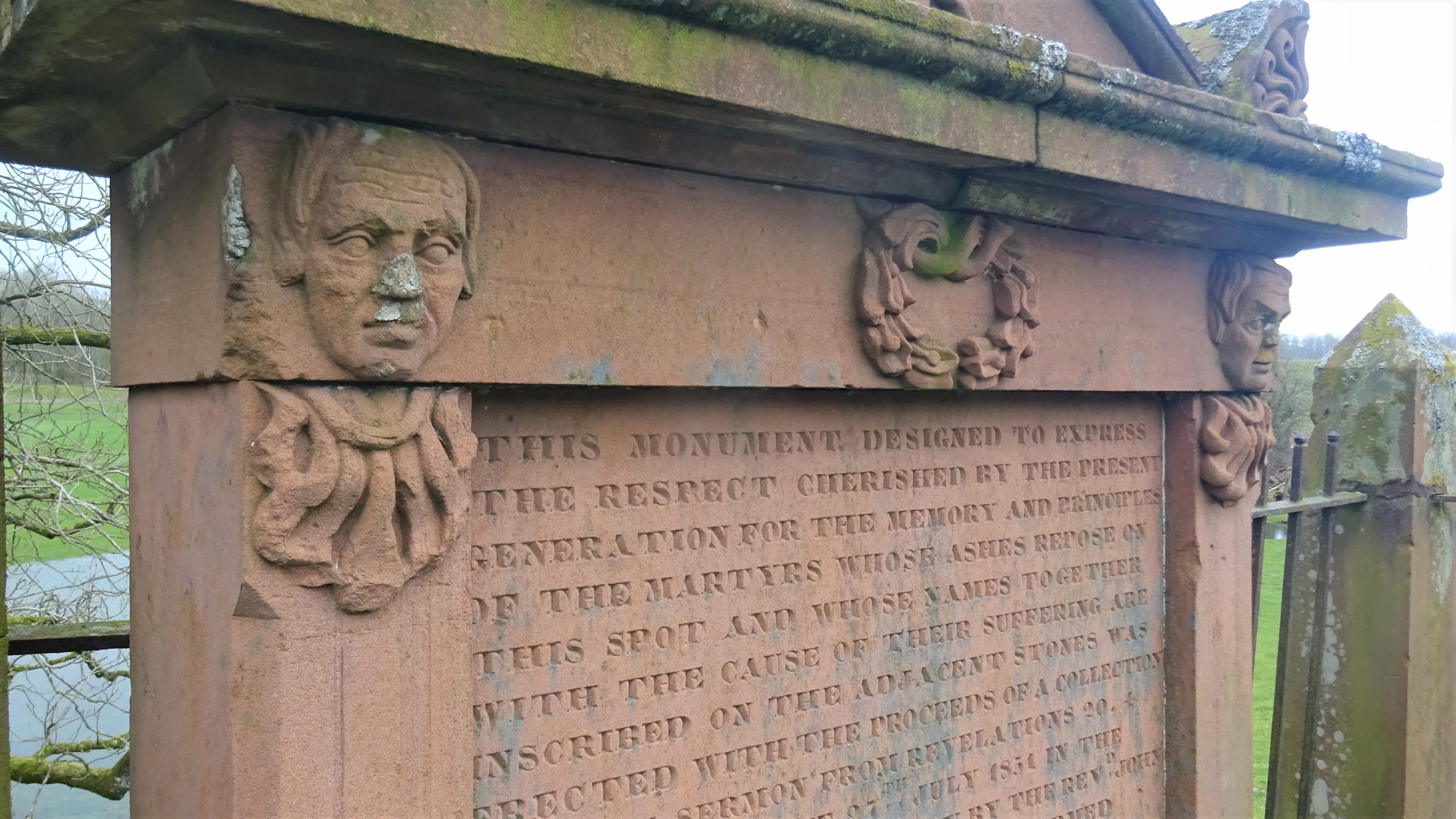
The carved faces of the martyrs

THIS MONUMENT, DESIGNED TO EXPRESS THE RESPECT CHERISHED BY THE PRESENT GENERATION FOR THE MEMORY AND PRINCIPLES OF THE MARTYRS WHOSE ASHES REPOSE ON THIS SPOT AND WHOSE NAMES TOGETHER WITH THE CAUSE OF THEIR SUFFERING ARE INSCRIBED ON THE ADJACENT STONES WAS ERECTED WITH THE PROCEEDS OF A COLLECTION AFTER A SERMON FROM REVELATIONS 20. 4 PREACHED ON THE 27TH JULY 1851 IN THE CHURCHYARD OF IRONGRAY BY THE REVD JOHN MCDERMID MINISTER OF THE REFORMED PRESBYTERIAN CHURCH, DUMFRIES.

AND I SAW THE SOULS OF THEM THAT WERE BEHEADED FOR THE WITNESS OF JESUS AND FOR THE WORD OF GOD AND WHICH HAD

NOT WORSHIPPED THE BEAST NEITHER HIS IMAGE NEITHER HAD RECEIVED HIS MARK UPON THEIR FOREHEADS OR IN THEIR HANDS AND THEY LIVED AND REIGNED WITH CHRIST A THOUSAND YEARS.

== See also ==
- Trumpeter's Well
