= Drumclog railway station =

Former railway station in Scotland

Coordinates: 55.6219°N 4.1641°W

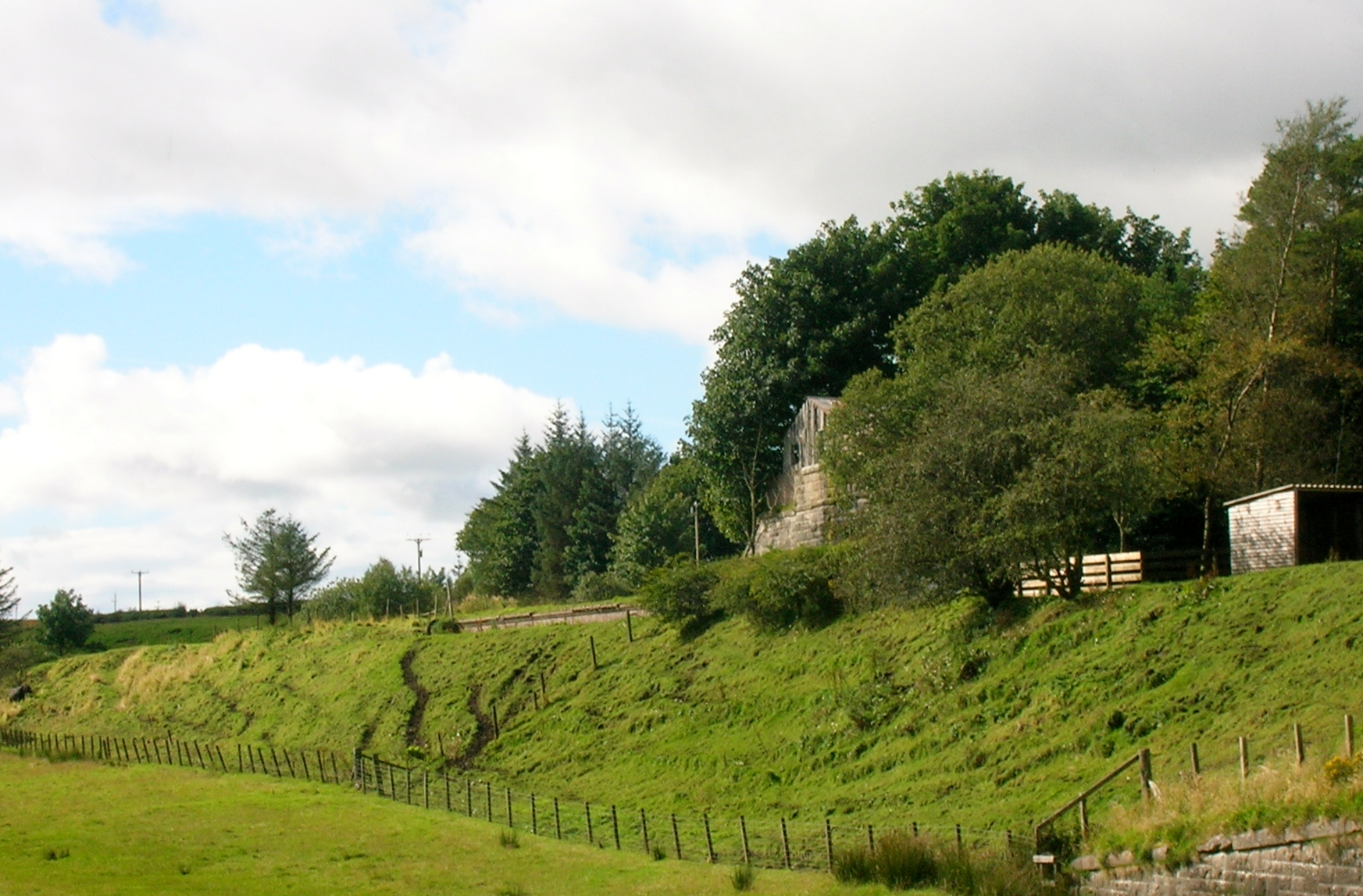
- Drumclog's old railway station site

General information
- Location: Drumclog, South Lanarkshire; Scotland
- Platforms: 2

Other information
- Status: Disused

History
- Original company: Caledonian Railway
- Pre-grouping: Caledonian Railway
- Post-grouping: London, Midland and Scottish Railway

Key dates
- 1 May 1905: Opened
- January 1917: closed
- December 1922: reopened
- 11 September 1939: Officially closed to passengers and goods
Location

Drumclog (NS 63889 38645) was a railway station on the Darvel and Strathaven Railway serving a rural area that included the village of Drumclog in South Lanarkshire, Scotland.

== History ==
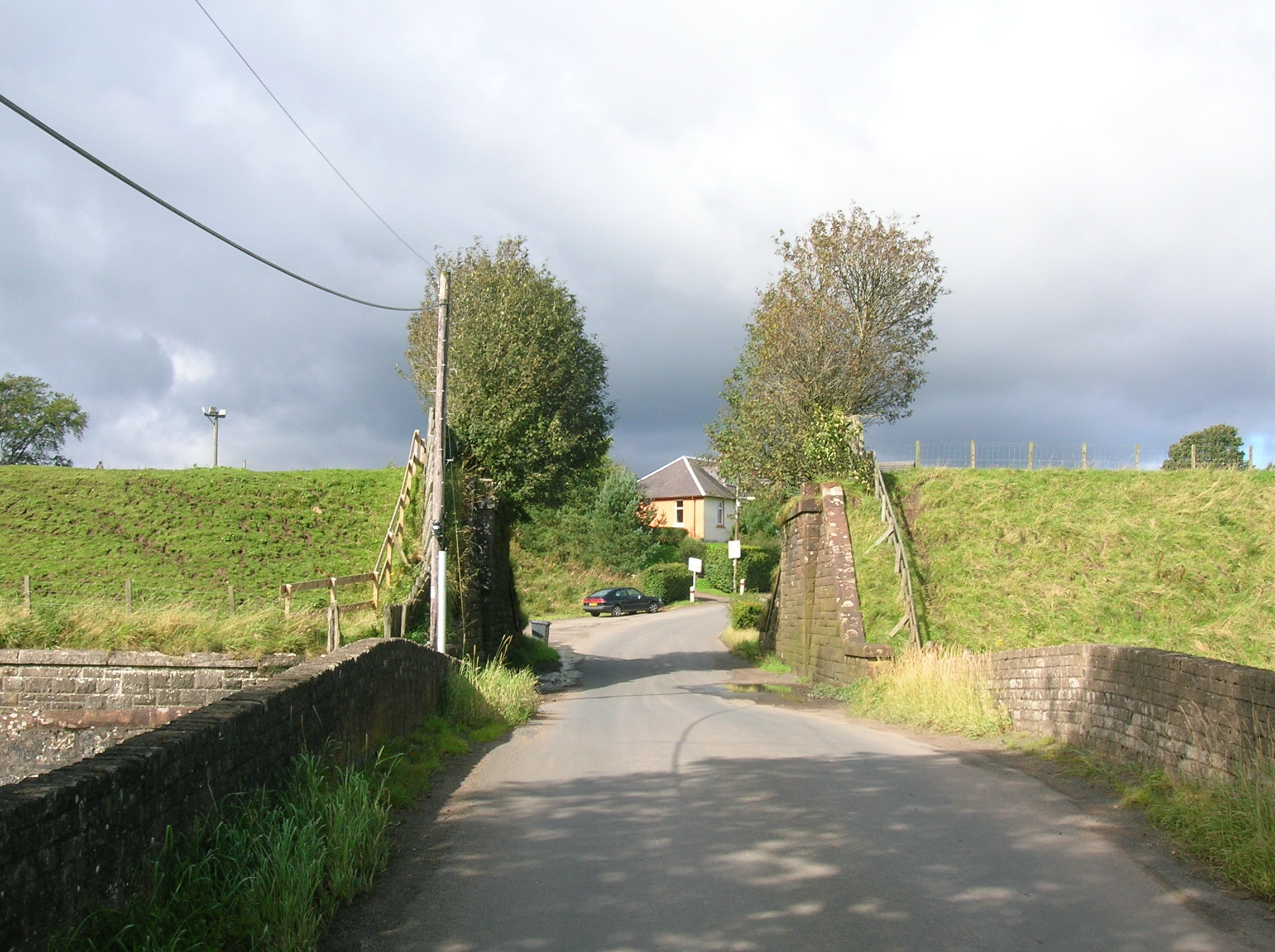
Overbridge remnant near the old Drumclog station site.

On 4 July 1905, the line opened, thereby connecting the Darvel Branch that ran from Kilmarnock, resulting in the line becoming a through route to Strathaven which was a line jointly run between the Glasgow and South Western Railway (G&SWR) and the Caledonian Railway (CR). The CR owned the Loudounhill to Strathaven section and the G&SWR owned the section from Loudounhill to Darvel and beyond

Despite being in theory a through route, no trains ran between Kilmarnock and Strathaven; instead, the two companies took it in turns to run the line between Darvel and Strathaven every six months. Stations were also located at Ryeland and Loudounhill. The line was never successful and closed in 1939 and the track lifted in 1951.

The station had a signal box on the platform and a wooden waiting room and ticket office. The station had an island platform and a footbridge gave passengers access. Several sidings with a goods yard and loading dock were present.

In 1938 the station was used to stable the royal train when King George VI and Queen Elizabeth were on a visit to an event in Glasgow.

The Drumclog Memorial Kirk used the station to transport Sunday School children on annual outings except for during WWI when the line station was closed.

The nominal junction between the Caledonian Railway and the Glasgow and South Western Railway was at the county boundary at Loudounhill Station. The closed line was used to store hundreds of damaged railway waggons that were awaiting repair.

The line had been intended as a through route between Lanarkshire and Ayrshire, however there was very little traffic along the route as the population in the area was very low. The station was closed from September until November 1909 and then again from January 1917 until December 1922. As stated, the last train ran on 10 September 1939, however the official closing date was two weeks later.

The buildings were sold off to private buyers and are still standing today as cottages. A photograph can be found at this site.

== Other stations ==
- Ryeland
- Loudounhill

== Previous and next stations ==
Preceding station	Historical railways	Following station
Ryeland	Glasgow and South Western Railway / Caledonian Railway; Darvel and Strathaven Railway	Loudounhill
