= Drumclog Moss =

Coordinates: 55.63168°N 4.18459°W

Drumclog Moss is a flat wilderness of broken bog and quagmire in Lanarkshire, Scotland.

The Covenanters defeated Claverhouse's dragoons at the site in the 1679 Battle of Drumclog.

The name Drumclog may have Brittonic origins. The first part of the name may be *drum, meaning "a back, a ridge", and the second *clog, "a rock, a crag, a steep cliff" (Welsh drum-clog), in place names meaning a standing stone or other stones of perceived significance. The second part of the name could also be the cognate Gaelic element clach.
