= Loudoun Hill =

Mountain in Scotland

Coordinates: 55.61472°N 4.21168°W

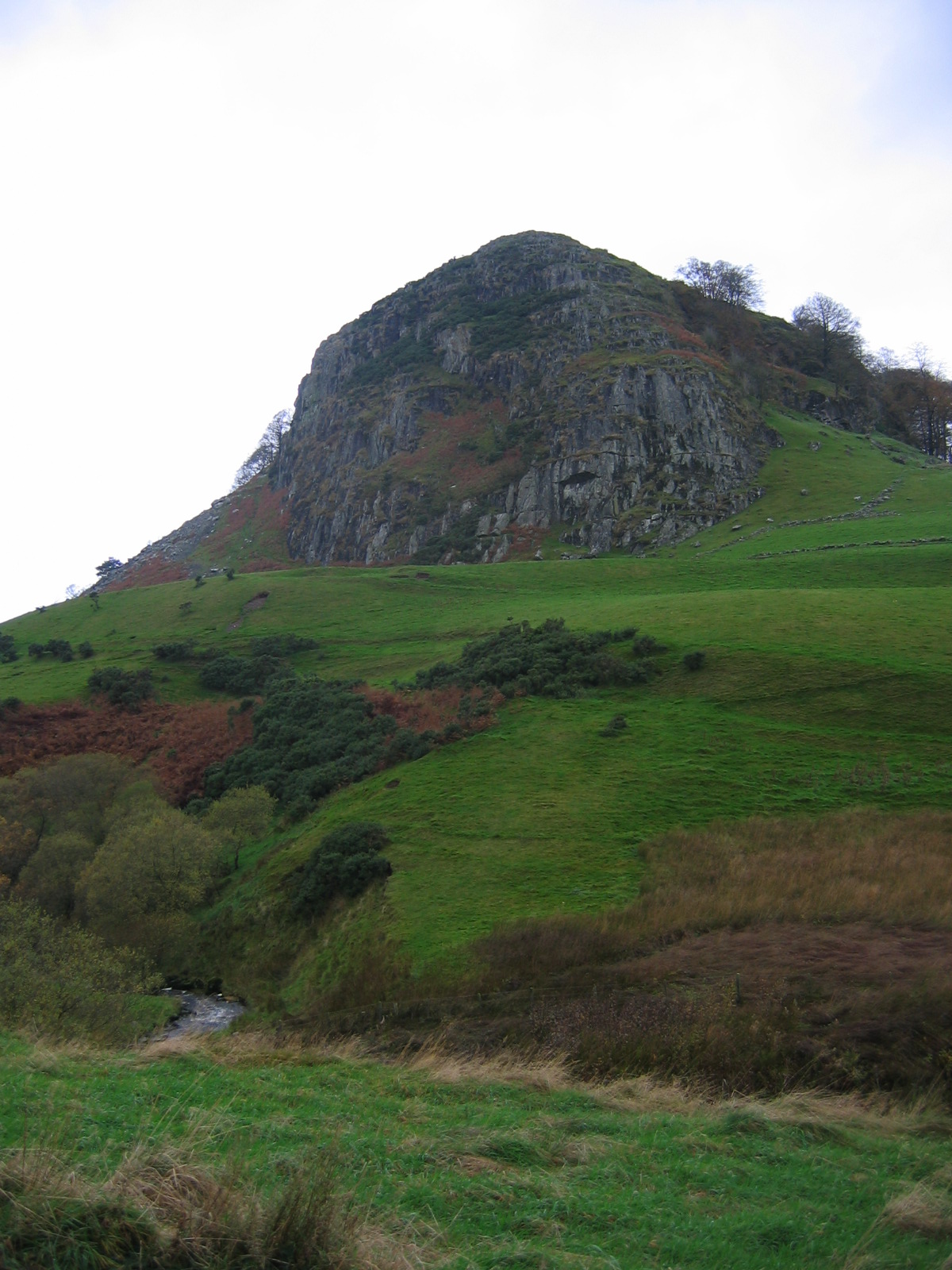
- Loudoun Hill from the east side

Highest point
- Elevation: 316 m (1,037 ft)
- Prominence: c. 66 m

Naming
- Native name: Beinn Lùghdain (Scottish Gaelic)

Geography
- Location within Scotland
- Location: East Ayrshire, Scotland
- OS grid: NS608379
- Topo map: OS Landranger 71

Geology
- Mountain type: Volcanic Plug

Loudoun Hill (Scottish Gaelic: Beinn Lùghdain; also commonly Loudounhill) is a volcanic plug in East Ayrshire, Scotland. It is located near the head of the River Irvine, east of Darvel.

== Location ==
The A71 Edinburgh - Kilmarnock road passes by the base of the hill. This route follows a Roman road which linked the Clyde Valley with the Ayrshire coast. Loudoun Hill's position at the highest point on this route gives it huge strategic significance. The hill stands above moorland, and commands 360-degree views. On clear days the coast, 40 km away, and the Isle of Arran beyond, are visible.

The Darvel and Strathaven Railway passed the hill, crossing a viaduct which was demolished as unsafe in 1986. Two piers of a bridge remain over a minor road.

== Etymology ==
As with the wider district and settlement of Loudoun which the hill historically belonged to, the origins of the place-name has been speculated upon variously in the untrained sense by antiquarians and modern enthusiasts. Prominent ideas have included 'low/lowe'-'dun' for fire hill, or 'luddan' for marshy ground. However, a coupling between southern Old English 'low/lowe' and older Gaelic 'dun' is an anachronistic construction that is unlikely, while the reference to marshy ground appears too generic as a topographical descriptor in the face of the regional prominence of the hill. Most hills in the region, including inconspicuous examples, benefit from well preserved Celtic toponymy, and so the academic hypothesis that Loudoun is derived, like several European examples, from 'Lugudunon' for 'fort of Lugus/Lugh', the Celtic deity, is more probable. If so, it may denote prehistoric cultural prominence of the hill.

== Prehistory ==
Loudoun Hill has long been a site of human occupation. An Iron Age settlement is located at the foot of the south east slope. Nearby at Allanton Beg a Roman fort was built. Finds from the fort include a bronze oil lamp of which a video has been produced.

In the year 2023, the East Kilbride topographical historian, Chris Ladds, discovered and photographed pronounced examples of cup marks, a cup and ring, and a wheel cross on Loudoun Hill's summit, with some evidence of authentic rock pecking techniques associated with Bronze Age workmanship. It was noted the markings were situated along the treacherous southern side of the summit above the steep drop, partly camouflaged by natural volcanic bubbling and weathered inclusion hollows in the surrounding rock. It was suggested that such carvings may have been inspired by the natural markings, and that the prehistoric significance of the hill may connect, in some way to its suspected later Celtic name derivation from Lugudunon.

== William Wallace ==
Longstanding tradition associates Loudoun Hill with an early battle of William Wallace that allegedly took place in 1296 or 1297. A relatively recent and crude graffito close to the hill's summit marks this association. However, such an important historical association is not mentioned in the prominent chronicles that detail the battles and the activities of Wallace in that period. All later traditional accounts trace their source information to a brief mention in the 15th-century epic poem 'The Wallace' by the Scottish minstrel Blind Harry.

Maps of the area name a mound to the east of Loudoun Hill as "Wallace's Grave". Traditionally this is the burial site of the English dead of this legendary battle, rather than Wallace's own grave.

On the slope opposite the mound is a modern sculptural monument to Wallace. Called the "Spirit of Scotland", it shows an outline of Wallace in steel, five metres high, and in inscribed around with poignant lines associated with his involvement and the values of Scottish agency and freedom. It was designed by local artist Richard Price, who helped create the design with his friends Robert and Sam Orr until it was placed at the site in September 2004.

== The Battle of Loudoun Hill ==
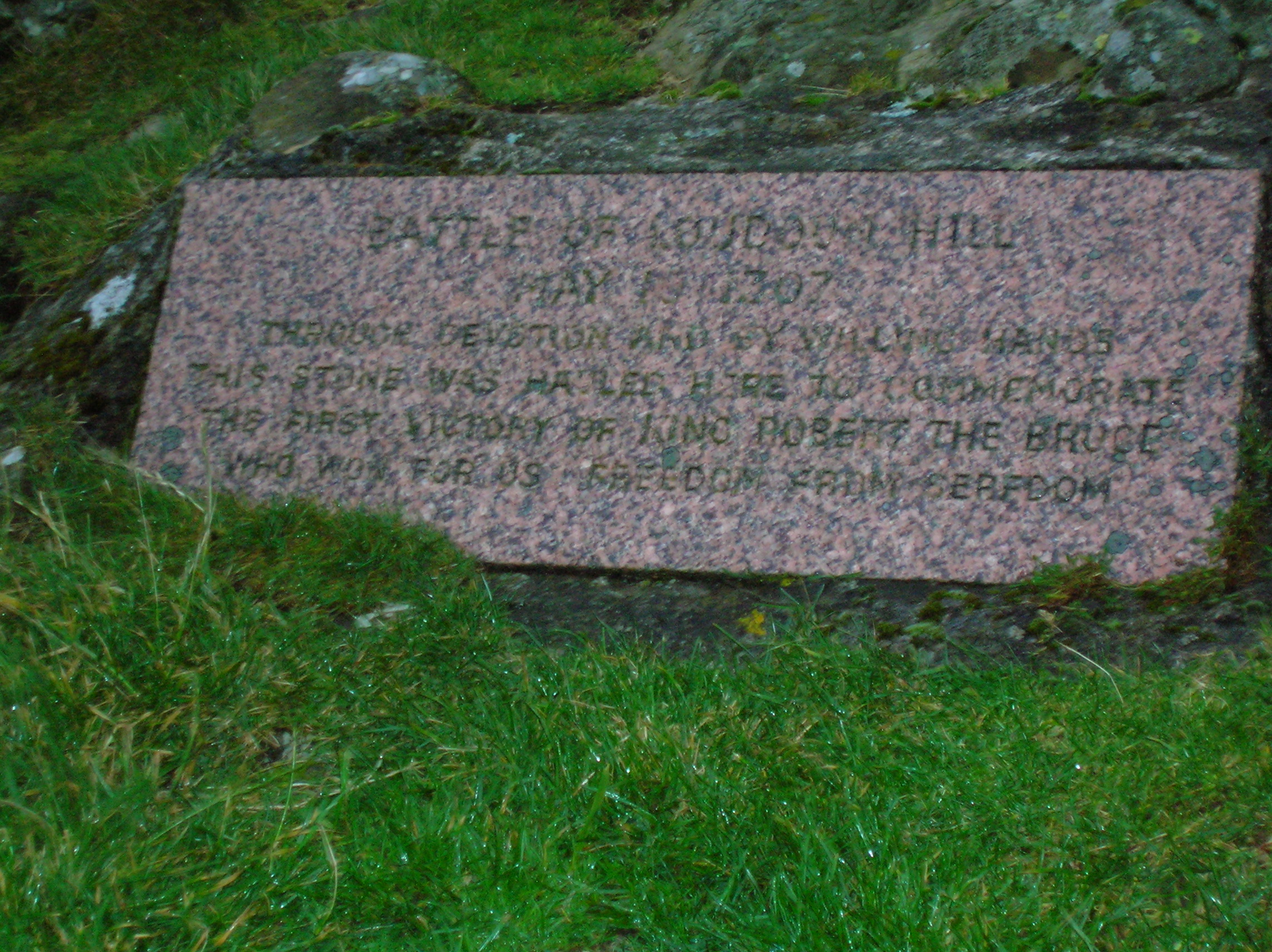
Commemorative Loudoun Hill summit stone

The historic Battle of Loudoun Hill took place in 1307. Robert the Bruce, following his time in hiding after the Battle of Methven, had begun his campaign to wrest his kingdom back from Edward I of England. He claimed his first major victory over the English at the Battle of Glen Trool in April 1307.

Robert Bruce adopted almost the same site, although slightly further east, and similar tactics, for another encounter with English forces, this time under Aymer de Valence, 2nd Earl of Pembroke. On 10 May, Bruce's men dug a series of trenches, forcing the English towards boggy ground around Loch Gait. This allowed the 500–600 Scots to repulse an army of 3000. The first attack broke, and the English fled the field. Following the battle, Bruce left his brother Edward Bruce in command of the area, and headed north to continue his guerilla campaign in Buchan.

== Witch folklore ==
An Ayrshire witch case from 1605 - the trial of Patrick Lowrie - involved the testimony that Satan appeared on 'Lowdon Hill' at witch covens in the form of "ane devillische spreit in likenes of ane woman,-helen M'Brune". The wider case, which included other Ayrshire places like Irvine shore, included the allegation that Lowrie had damaged the milk of Cows on Beltaine, and that he had been presented with a hairbelt in the shape of the Devil's claw. Other elements included exhuming corpses from kirkyards, and contacting the spirits of deceased people.

== Covenanters ==
On 1 June 1679 a large conventicle, or outdoor religious service, was held at Loudoun Hill. The service was organised by the outlawed Covenanters, but was well attended. John Graham of Claverhouse, recently appointed to suppress the religious rebels, heard about the conventicle and headed to the area. His attempt to break up the gathering led to a skirmish known as the Battle of Drumclog, in which Claverhouse's dragoons were humiliatingly routed. The battle site lies around 1 km (0.62 mi) east of the hill. This battle formed the initial action of Walter Scott's novel Old Mortality.

== Rock climbing ==
The hill is a popular rock climbing venue, being home to some of a small number of rocky outcrops in central Scotland. There is rock climbing information on Loudoun Hill available at Scottish Climbs and UK Climbing.

== Loudoun Hill section of the Irvine Valley Trails ==
In 2023, the Irvine Valley Trails Project was completed. This project was undertaken by East Ayrshire Council in conjunction with The Irvine Valley Regeneration Partnership. The contractor Ironside Farrar carried out landscape assessments and helped to implement trail infrastructure in gap areas. This enabled the creation of a linked network of accessible, diverse trails in the Irvine Valley area which celebrate the scenic and historical values of the area as well as its rural character and wildlife. A prominent route in the network runs between Loudoun Hill and Darvel, called 'Up the Line to Loudoun Hill'; part of the route covering sections of the former railway line. Interpretation panels in places describe the area in the context of Loudoun Hill.

== Farming ==
Loudoun Hill and the lands immediately around were farmed intensively for many generations, as shown by OS maps. Two farms were however abandoned between the 19th and 20th centuries, namely Underhill and Backhill. The ruins still stand and provide shelter for the sheep from surviving farms that continue to graze Loudoun Hill and the surrounding fields.

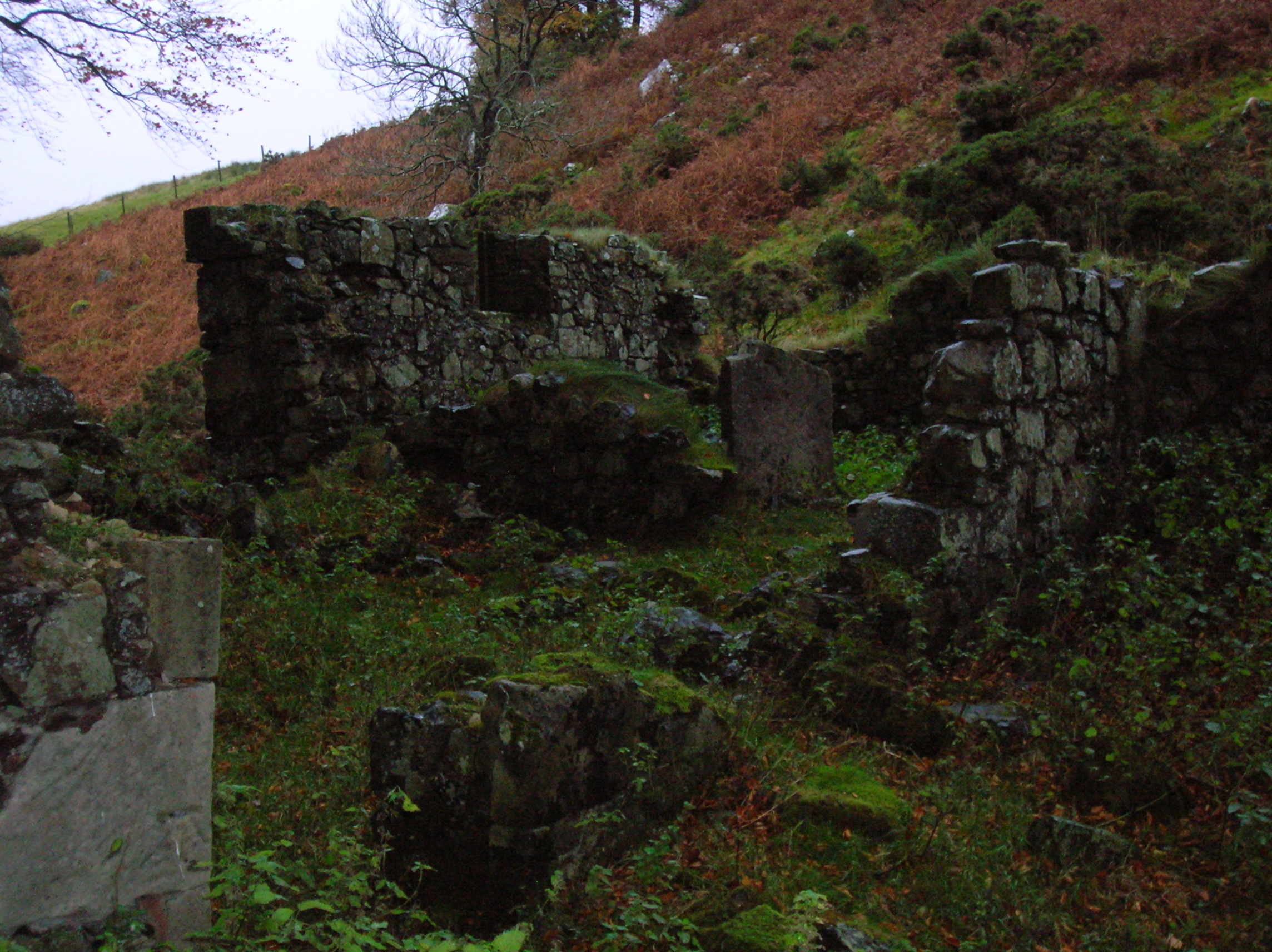
The old byre at Underhill Farm

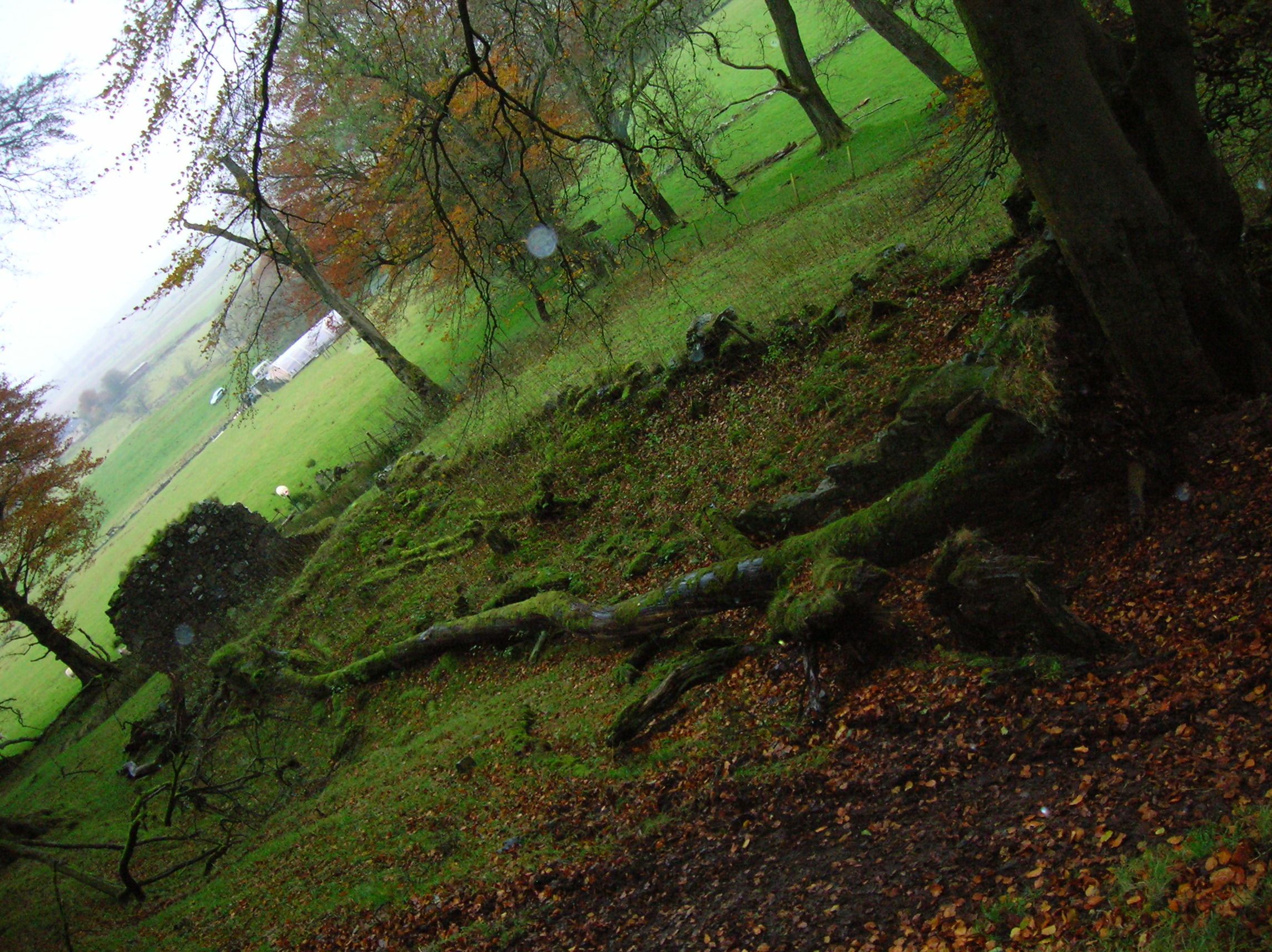
Backhill Farm ruins from Loudoun Hill

== Sources ==
- Service, John (1890). Thir Notandums being the literary recreations of the Laird Canticarl of Mongrynen. Edinburgh & London : Y. J. Pentland.
