= Darvel Branch =

Railway line in Scotland

The Darvel Branch was an extension of the former Glasgow, Paisley, Kilmarnock and Ayr Railway in Scotland built by the Glasgow and South Western Railway to allow trains to travel between Kilmarnock and Darvel.

== History ==
The line was built in stages, and originally opened as far as Galston on 9 August 1848. The branch was extended to Newmilns on 20 May 1850, and finally reached Darvel much later on 1 June 1896. Shortly after, on 1 May 1905, the line ceased to become a branch and became a through line to Strathaven and beyond when the Glasgow and South Western Railway and the Caledonian Railway opened a jointly run line. However, despite being a through line, no trains ever ran between Kilmarnock and Strathaven, instead the two companies took it in turns to run the line between Darvel and Strathaven every six months.

The line east of Darvel was never successful and closed in 1939, with the rest of the line closed to passengers on 6 April 1964. Little evidence of the line still exists today, aside from the occasional embankment and cutting along the route. One notable landmark is a 26-arch viaduct in Newmilns, part of which crosses the River Irvine, and most of which cuts through the middle of the town.

== Gallery ==
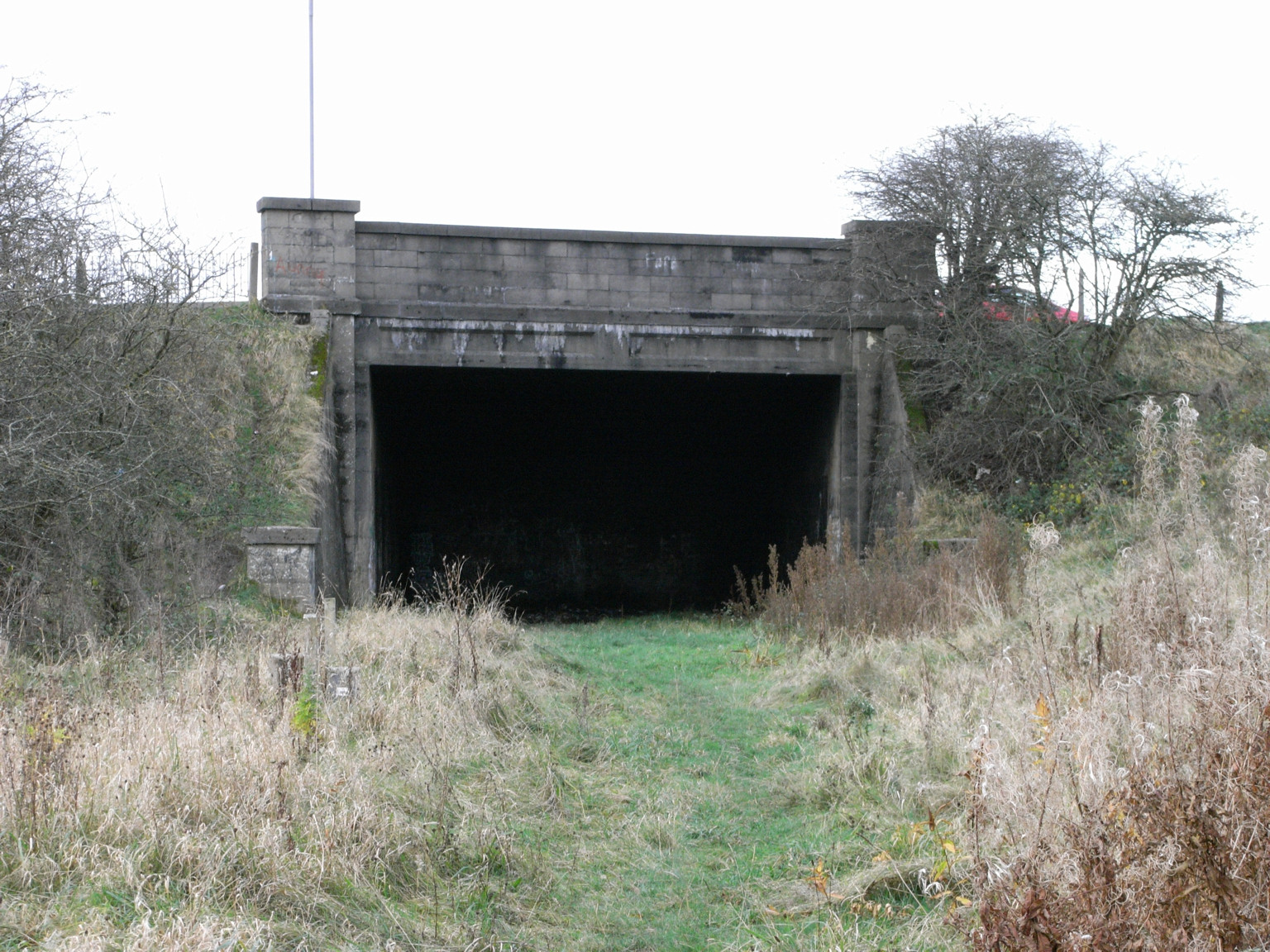
A partially filled in bridge near Barleith railway station in 2007

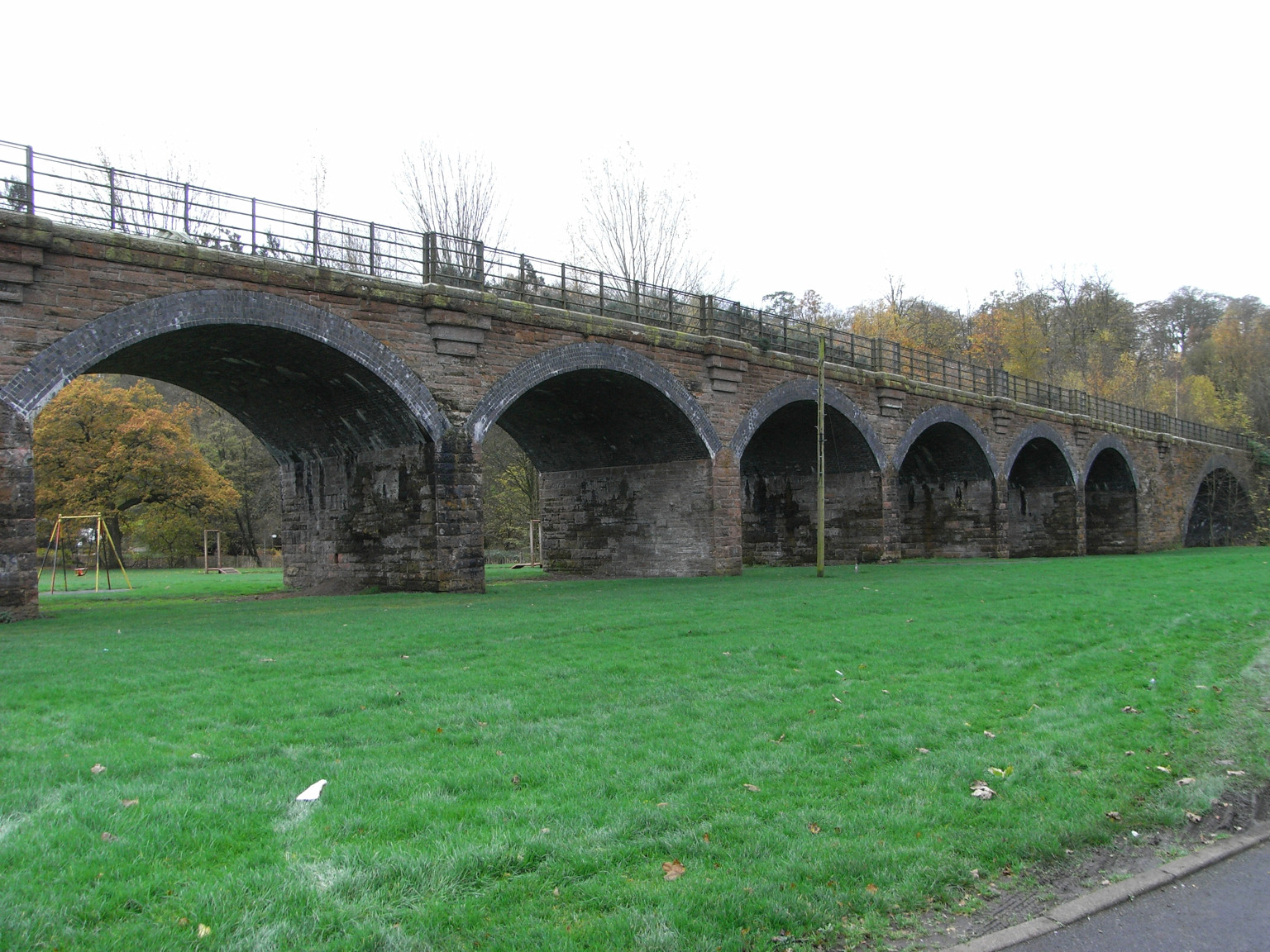
Newmilns viaduct in 2007

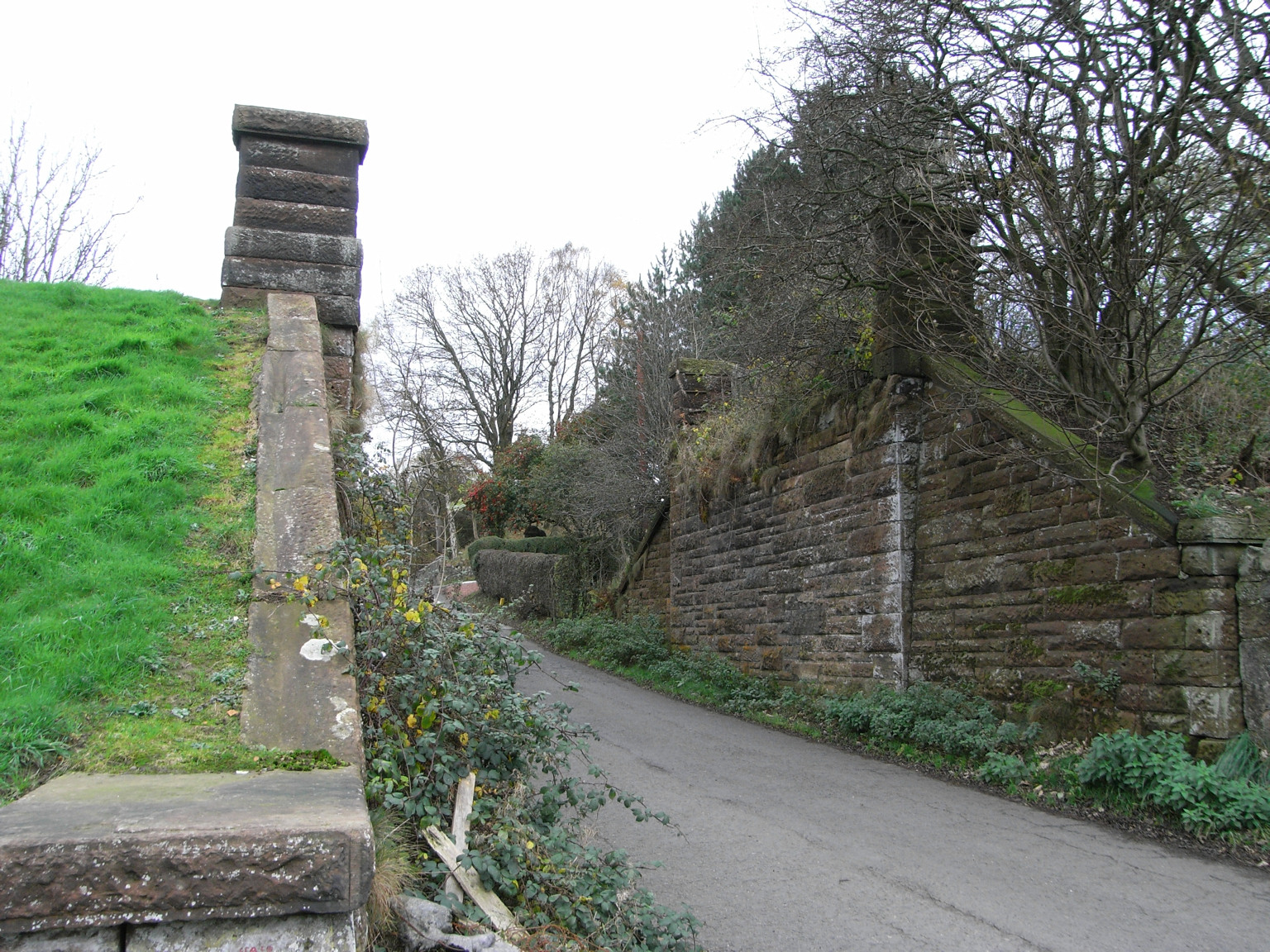
A missing bridge east of Newmilns viaduct in 2007

== Connections to other lines ==
- Darvel and Strathaven Railway east of Darvel
- Glasgow, Paisley, Kilmarnock and Ayr Railway at Galston Branch Junction
- Kilmarnock and Troon Railway west of Riccarton
