= Darvel and Strathaven Railway =

Railway line in Scotland

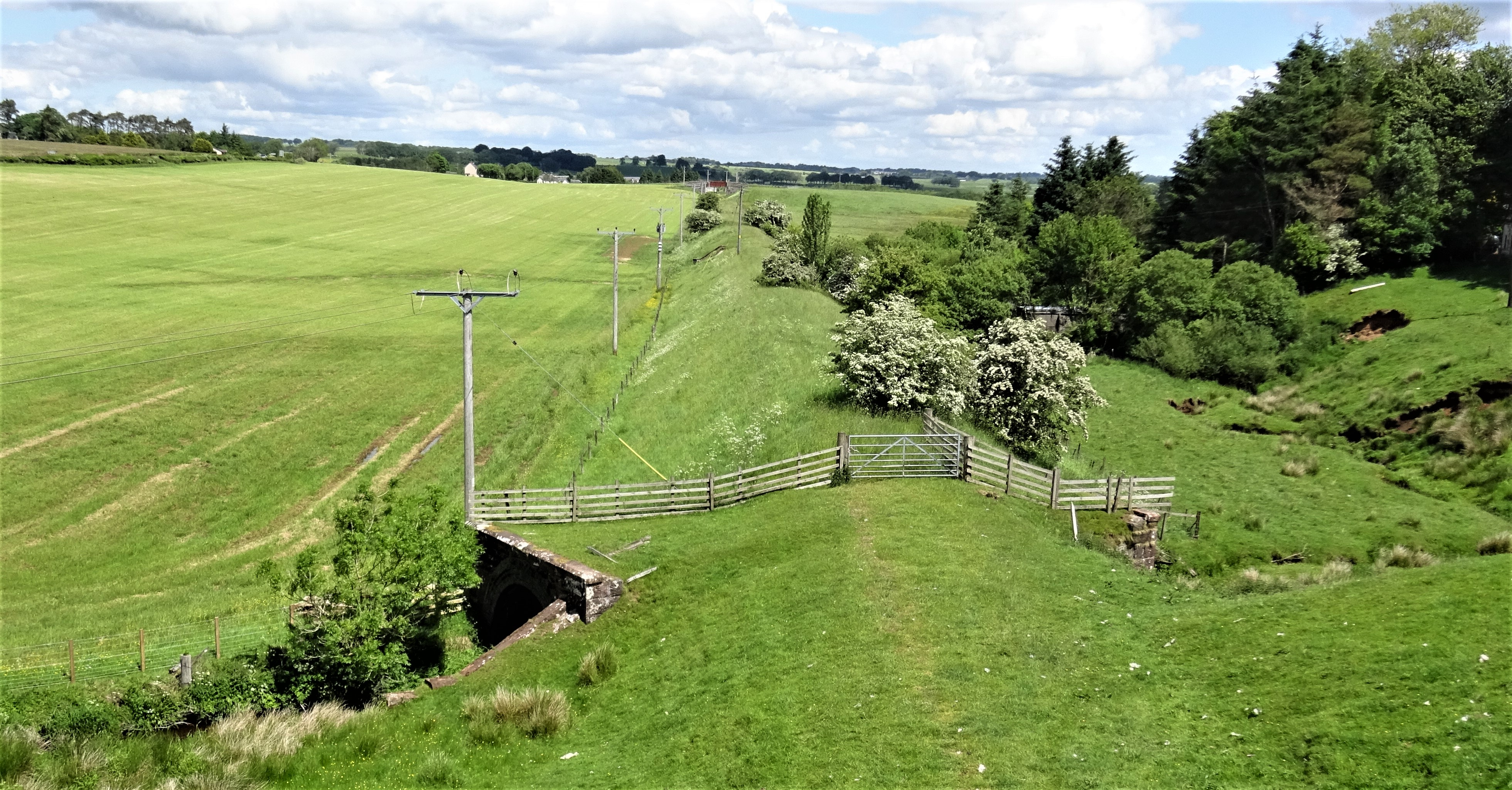
View towards old Ryeland Station, Darvel and Strathaven Railway grom South Lanarkshire

The Darvel and Strathaven Railway linked, with the Darvel Branch to the former Glasgow, Paisley, Kilmarnock and Ayr Railway in Scotland to allow trains to travel between Kilmarnock and Lanarkshire.

== History ==
On 4 July 1905 the line opened, connecting with the Darvel Branch, which became a through line to Strathaven which was a jointly run line between the Glasgow and South Western Railway and the Caledonian Railway. However, despite being a through line, no trains ever ran between Kilmarnock and Strathaven; instead, the two companies took it in turns to run the line between Darvel and Strathaven every six months.

The line was never successful and closed in 1939. Evidence of the line still exists today in the form of many embankment, bridges and cuttings along the route.

== Connections to other lines ==
- Darvel Branch west of Darvel
- Mid Lanarks Lines of the Caledonian Railway at Strathaven
- Hamilton and Strathaven Railway at Strathaven
