= Hannington, Wiltshire =

Village in Wiltshire, England

Coordinates: 51.638°N 1.749°W

Hannington
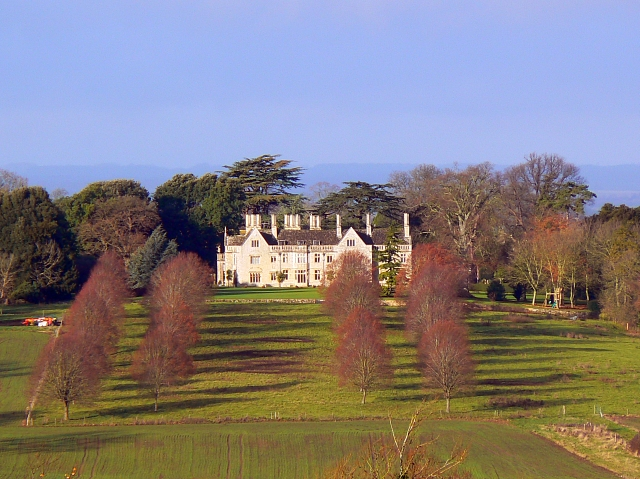
- Hannington Hall

- Location within Wiltshire
- Population: 243 (in 2021)
- OS grid reference: SU175933
- Civil parish: Hannington
- Unitary authority: Swindon
- Ceremonial county: Wiltshire
- Region: South West
- Country: England
- Sovereign state: United Kingdom
- Post town: SWINDON
- Postcode district: SN6
- Dialling code: 01793
- Police: Wiltshire
- Fire: Dorset and Wiltshire
- Ambulance: South Western
- UK Parliament: Swindon North
- Website: Parish Council

Hannington is a village and civil parish in Wiltshire, England, about 2 miles (3.2 km) north-west of Highworth, within the Borough of Swindon. The parish includes the hamlets of Hannington Wick (north of Hannington village) and Swanborough (south, on the border with Highworth parish). The River Thames forms both the northern boundary of the parish and the county boundary with Gloucestershire.

John Marius Wilson of the Imperial Gazetteer of England and Wales in 1870 described the village of Hannington as:

A village and a parish in Highworth district, Wilts. The village stands 2 miles W by N of Highworth, 2 S of the river Thames at the boundary with Gloucester, and 7 NE of Swindon Junction r. station; is a pretty place, built in the form of the letter Y; and has a post office under Swindon.

== Demographics ==
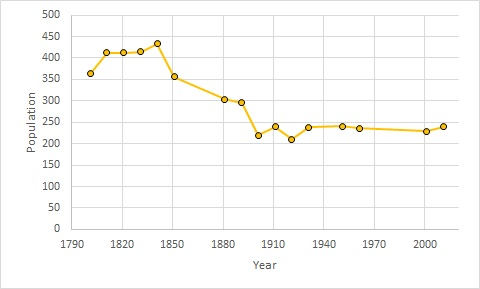
Total population for the parish 1800–2011

=== Population ===
The parish of Hannington had a population of 240 at the 2011 census. 433 people lived in Hannington in 1841. Numbers then steadily declined, and since the 1940s the parish population has plateaued around the 250 mark.

=== Occupations ===
Occupation statistics for the parish 1881

The occupations recorded for the parish in 1881 are shown in the graph (left). They were dominated by agriculture with 46 people, almost all male, while those employed in domestic service were almost all female.

== Hannington Hall ==
Hannington Hall is a Grade II* listed country house built in 1653, which has been a centrepiece of the village since Sir Thomas Freke commissioned and paid for its construction. The grounds of the hall are dotted with buildings associated with the running of the estate such as the Victorian stable block.

== Parish church ==
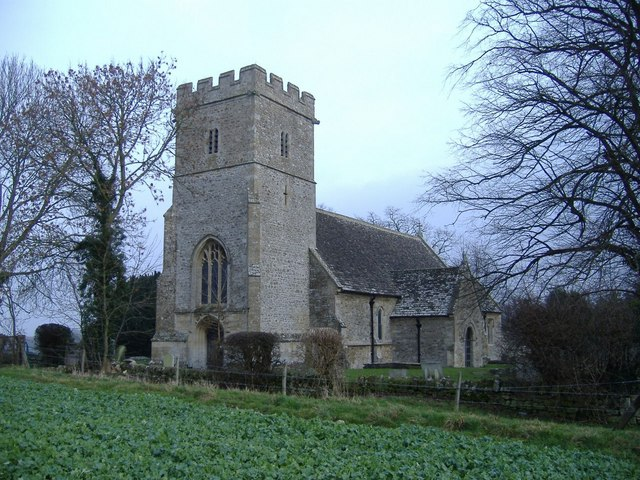
St John the Baptist Church, Hannington

The Grade II* listed Church of England parish church is dedicated to John the Baptist. It was rebuilt in 1869–1871, retaining two 12th-century doorways and the 15th-century tower.

Today, the church is within the benefice of Highworth with Sevenhampton and Inglesham and Hannington, centred on St Michael's church at Highworth.

== Transport ==
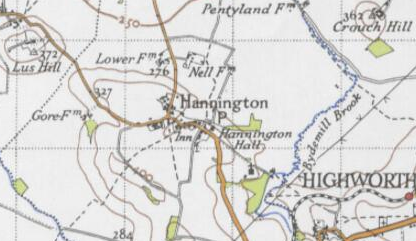
Hannington on a 1945 Ordnance Survey map

The minor road running through the village connects to the B4019 Blunsdon-Highworth road to the south, giving access to the M4 motorway via the A419. The road north through Hannington Wick continues to Kempsford, and another minor road leads north-west to Castle Eaton.

The village has been without access to the rail network since 1962 when the Highworth branch line closed following declining passenger numbers. The branch from Swindon to Highworth was opened in 1883, over forty years after the main line was built through Swindon. Hannington station was about a mile south-east of the village, near the Blunsdon to Highworth road; there were other intermediate stations at Stratton and Stanton Fitzwarren.

== Notable people ==
- Thomas Freke (1660–1721)
