= Highworth railway station =

Disused railway station in Highworth, Wiltshire

Highworth
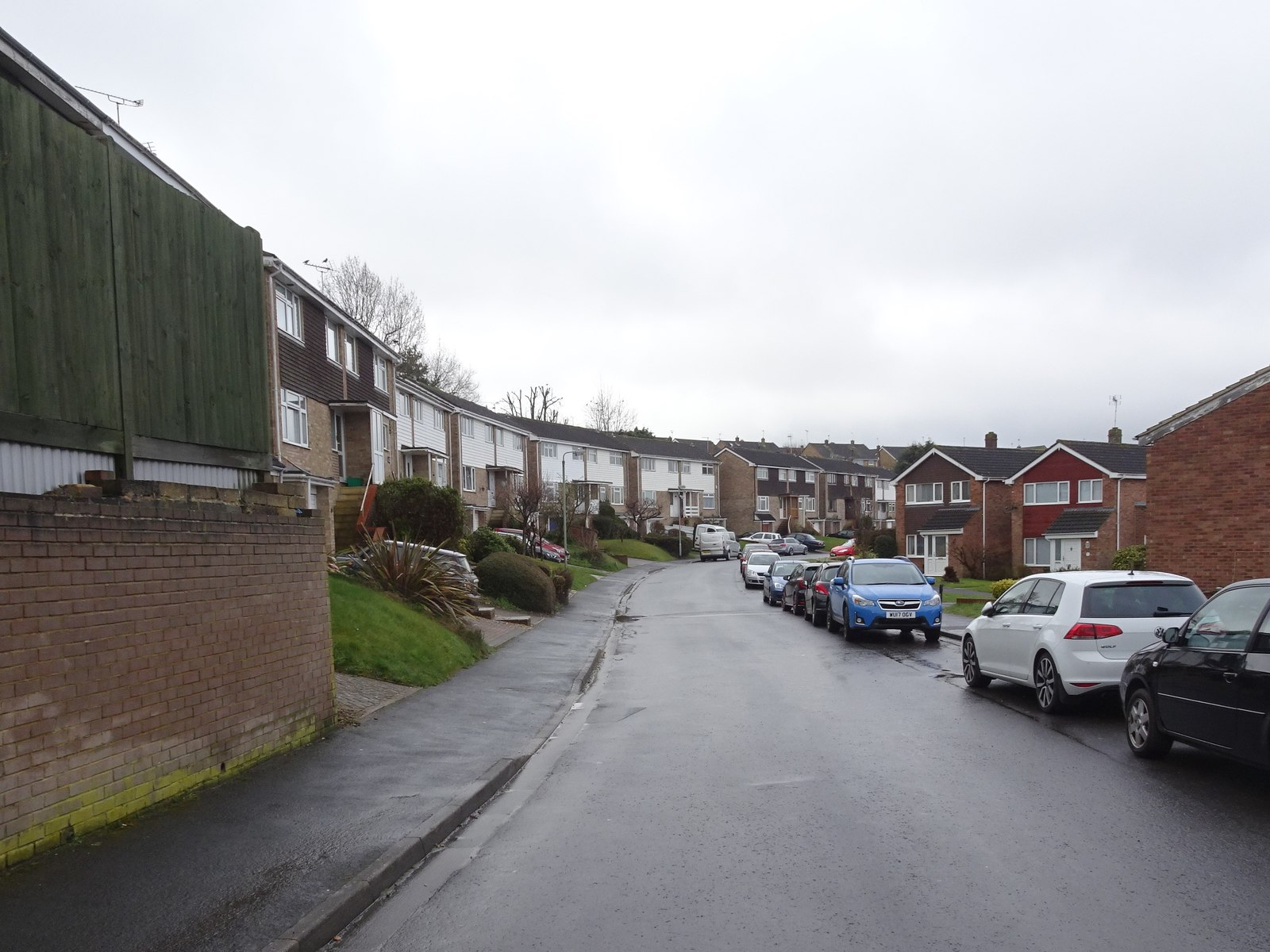
- The site of the station in 2018

General information
- Location: Highworth, Wiltshire; England
- Coordinates: 51.6309°N 1.7178°W
- Grid reference: SU196924
- Platforms: 1

Other information
- Status: Disused

History
- Original company: Great Western Railway
- Pre-grouping: Great Western Railway
- Post-grouping: Great Western Railway; British Railways (Western Region)

Key dates
- 9 May 1883: Opened
- 2 March 1953: Closed to passengers
- 2 August 1962: Closed completely
Location

Highworth railway station served the town of Highworth, Wiltshire, England, from 1883 to 1962 on the Highworth branch line.

The station was opened on 9 May 1883 by Great Western Railway. It closed to public passengers on 2 March 1953 but it remained open for employees at Swindon Works until 2 August 1962.

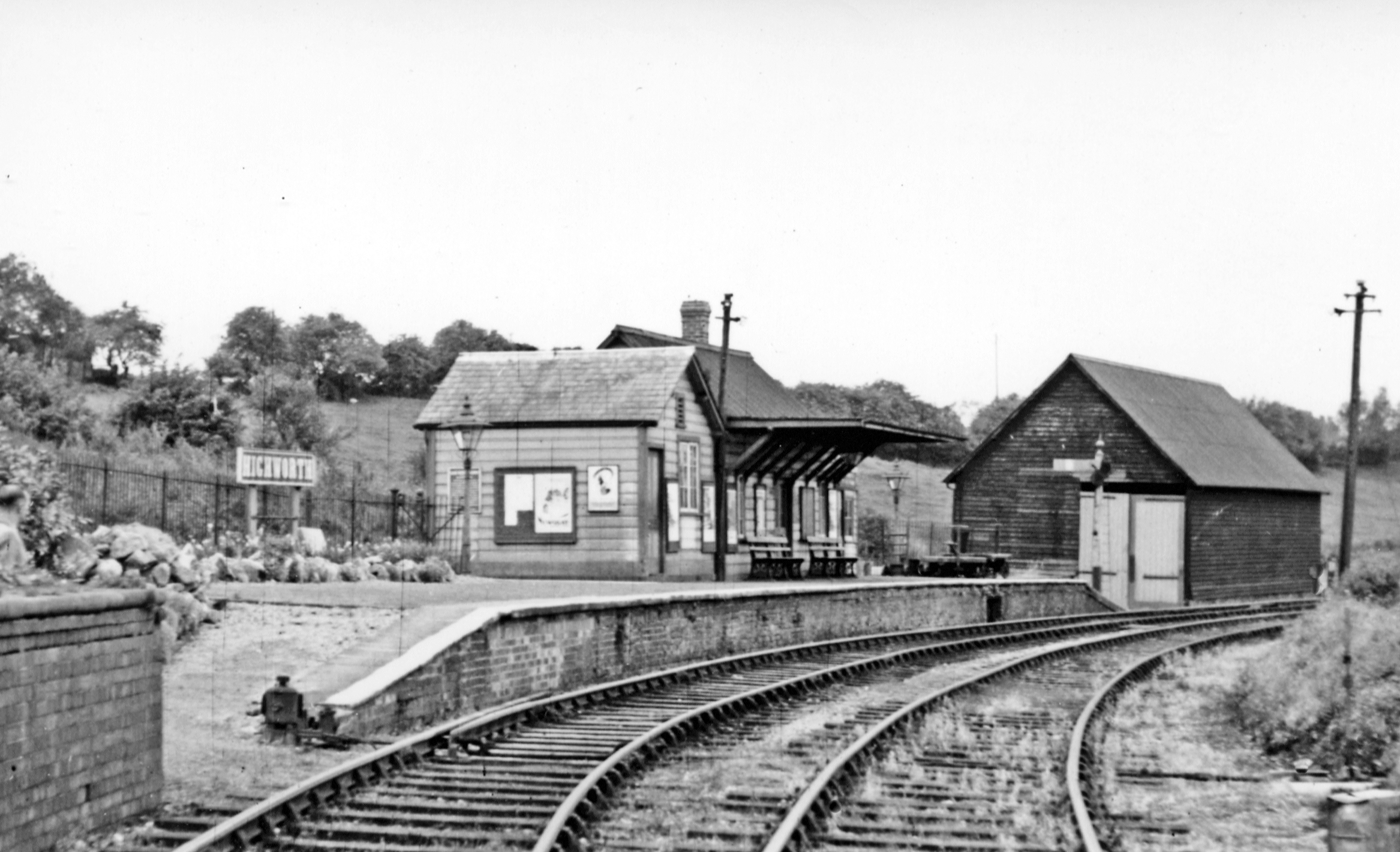
Highworth Station in 1950

Preceding station	Disused railways	Following station
Terminus	Great Western Railway; Highworth branch line	Hannington; Line and station closed
