= 1848 Shrivenham rail collision =

Train collision in Shrivenham, UK

Coordinates: 51.5868°N 1.6585°W

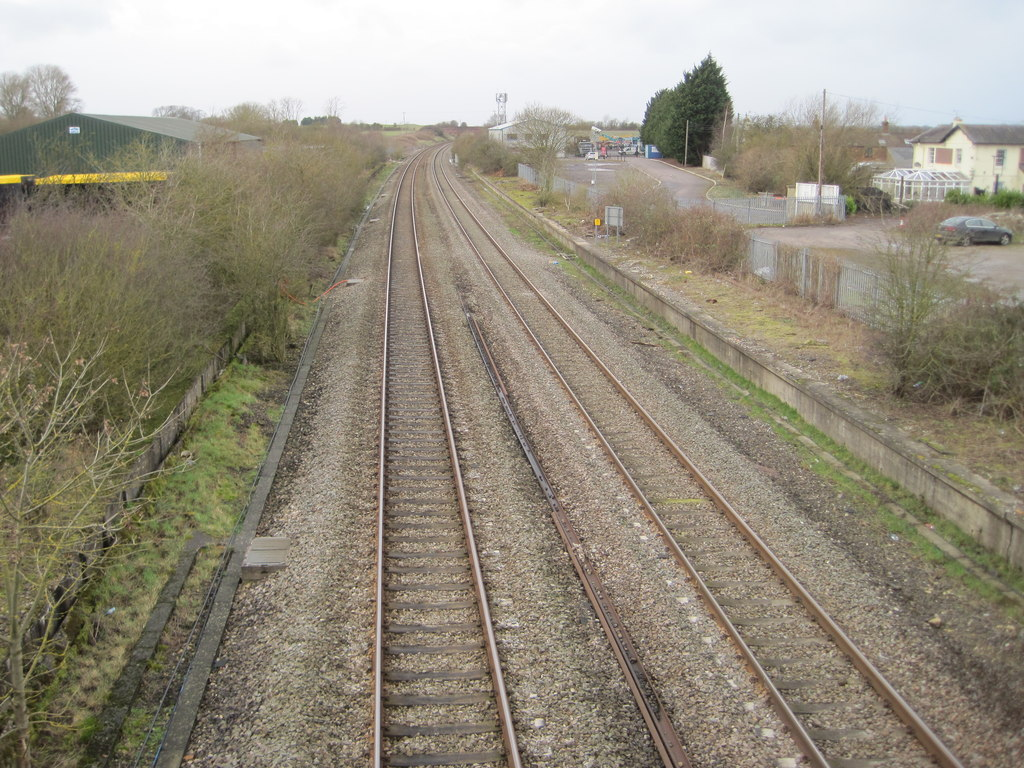
- Site of the collision

Details
- Date: 10 May 1848; Around 3:17 p.m.
- Location: Shrivenham, England
- Country: United Kingdom
- Line: Great Western Main Line
- Operator: Great Western Railway
- Incident type: Collision
- Cause: Human error

Statistics
- Trains: 2
- Passengers: 200
- Deaths: 8
- Injured: 13+

The 1848 Shrivenham rail collision was a rail accident that occurred in England on 10 May 1848, resulting in at least six deaths and 13 injuries.

== Background ==
On 10 May 1848, at around 3:17 p.m., George Pargetter (the station signalman), left his post with the signal reading that the tracks were clear. When he left his post, he failed to inform the other staff members that a train from Exeter was running late. A merchandise train was already occupying the line as it was being unloaded at the station.

The merchandise train was parked between a turntable and a train shed. A portion of the train was still on the main line as the Exeter express made its approach.

The express from Exeter was running 23 minutes late because it had to pick up an additional two passenger coaches at Bristol. Engineer "Bob" Roscoe was instructed not to make up the lost time and proceeded to the station at 55 mph (88 kph).

== Collision ==
As the Exeter express approached, it was too late. Roscoe first saw the obstacle on the track with only 150 yards to spare. The passenger train began to sideswipe the goods train, shattering a horsebox and sending debris flying.

Behind the horsebox was a cattle car which struck the luggage car, got jammed between the platform, and then proceeded to crush the following passenger cars containing around 30 passengers. Also injured in the collision was one of the station porters who had been struck by flying debris.

When the scene finally settled, the dead and injured were carried from the train cars and moved to a tavern to recover. Four passengers died on the scene, and four more died in the following days, with the last one dying eight days after the impact.

== Aftermath ==
Following the disaster, a trial was held to determine blame for the accident. A jury would not put the blame on George Pargetter, despite his failure to inform the other staff of the delayed train. Instead, the other two on-duty station porters were charged and found guilty of manslaughter.

=== 1936 Collision ===
On 15 January 1936, Shrivenham railway station was the site of another accident, again involving a passenger express crashing into a goods train. Again, the cause would be error caused by the signalman. Two people would die in the collision and a further 28 would be injured.

== See also ==
- Southall rail crash - A train collision and derailment that occurred in a similar manner, with the collision also being caught on CCTV.
