= Castle Eaton =

Village and civil parish in Wiltshire, England

Coordinates: 51.661°N 1.791°W

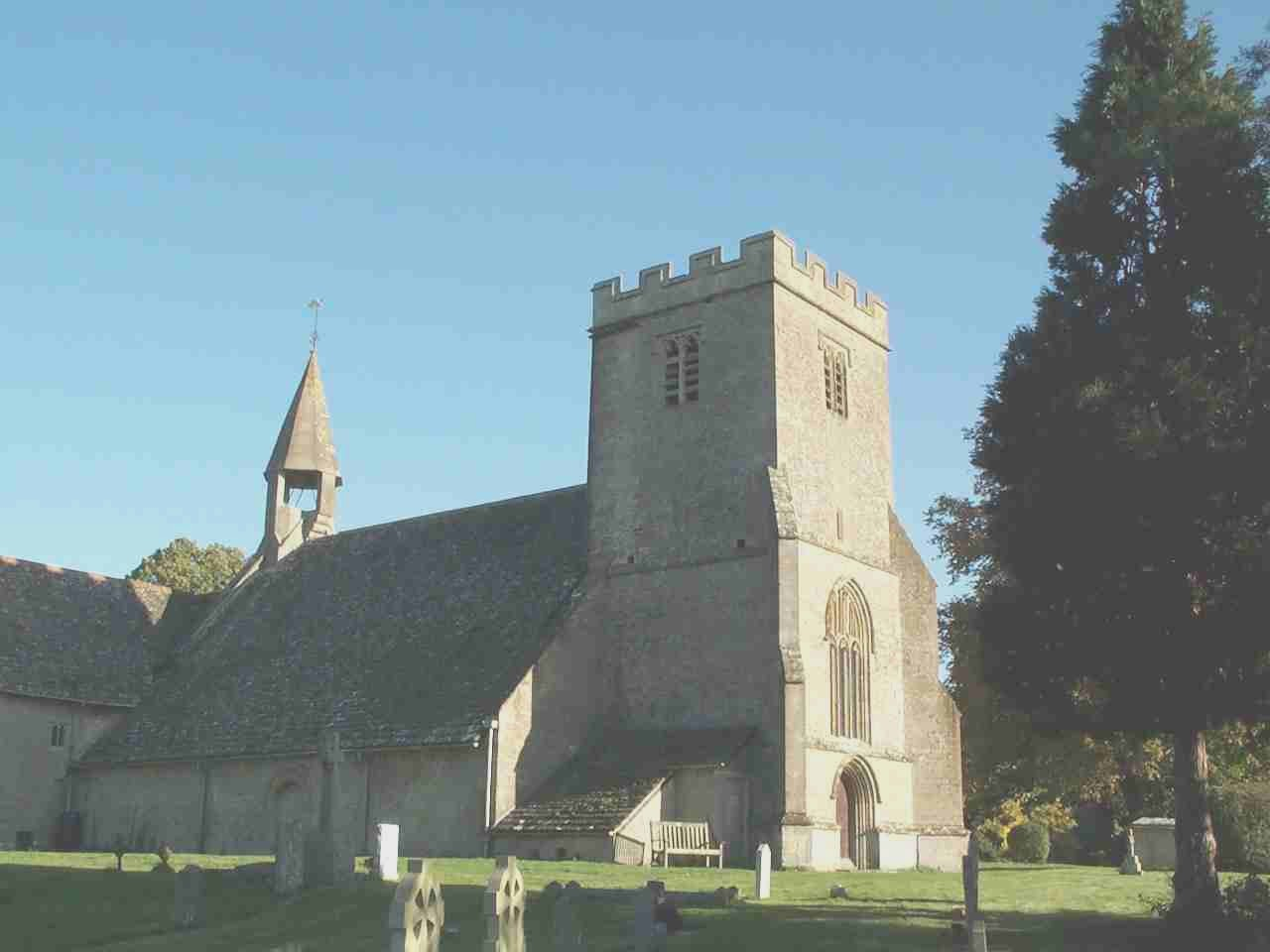
- St Mary the Virgin parish church

- Location within Wiltshire
- Population: 231 (2011 census)
- OS grid reference: SU146958
- Unitary authority: Swindon
- Ceremonial county: Wiltshire
- Region: South West
- Country: England
- Sovereign state: United Kingdom
- Post town: Swindon
- Postcode district: SN6
- Dialling code: 01285
- Police: Wiltshire
- Fire: Dorset and Wiltshire
- Ambulance: South Western
- UK Parliament: Swindon North
- Website: Parish Council

Castle Eaton is a village and civil parish in the ceremonial county of Wiltshire, England, on the River Thames about 4 miles (6.4 km) northwest of Highworth. It was historically in the area governed by the (former) Wiltshire County Council, but since 1997 has been part of the Borough of Swindon. The Thames at Castle Eaton forms both the northern boundary of the parish and the county boundary with Gloucestershire.

The village is characterised by its older buildings, most of which are in The Street, the original main thoroughfare. Built of local stone, they give Castle Eaton the look of a traditional Cotswold village. Many of the buildings date from about 1650 to 1850, and most of the village is a Conservation Area.

The name Eaton derives from the Old English ēatūn meaning 'settlement on a river'. The affix Castle refers to a castle built in the village during the 12th century.

== Parish church ==
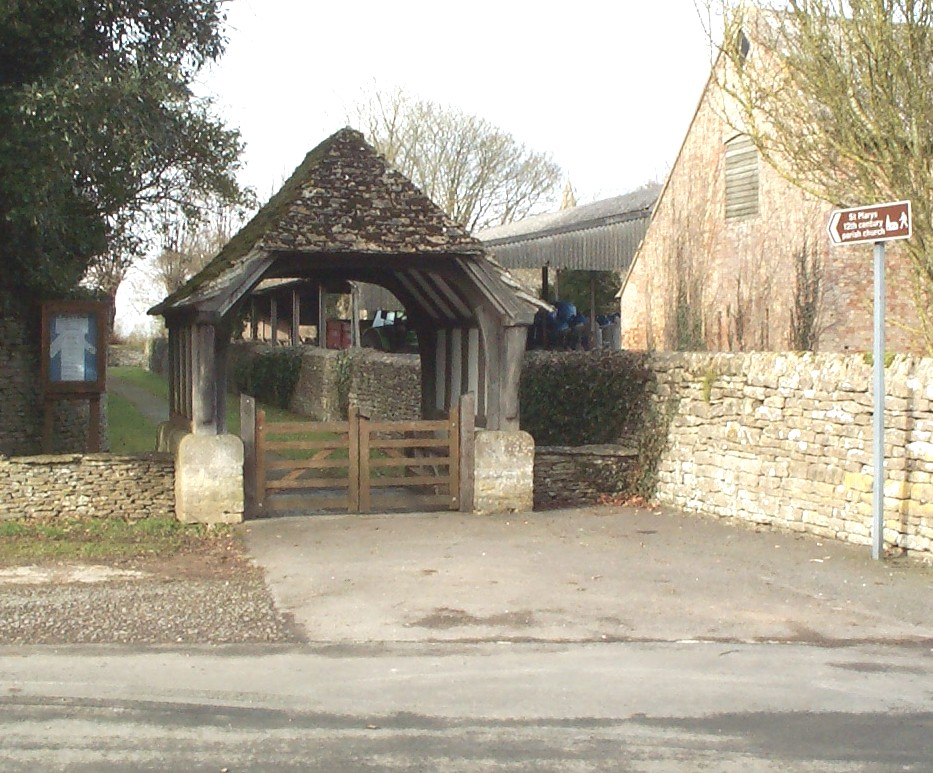
St.Mary's lychgate

The parish church dedicated to Saint Mary the Virgin is a Grade I listed building. It has two Norman doorways. The chancel was built late in the 13th century in the Early English Gothic style, and at its east end has a trio of stepped lancet windows. The building was restored by William Butterfield in 1861–1863, who added a distinctive corbelled bellcote on the roof above the chancel arch. The west tower has a ring of six bells.

In the churchyard near the entrance is a medieval standing cross that is a scheduled Ancient Monument.

The church can be reached only on foot, via a path linking the lychgate with the east end of The Street.

== Amenities ==
The village has a public house, the Red Lion, which claims to be first public house on the River Thames after leaving its source at Thames Head in the Cotswolds.

== Thames Path ==
Castle Eaton is on the Thames Path National Trail between the towns of Cricklade, upstream to the west, and Lechlade, downstream to the east. The Cricklade to Lechlade section of the Thames Path is 11.6 miles long of which 5.3 miles is alongside the river, with detours where riverside access has not been possible. In Castle Eaton, the path is unable to follow the banks of the river and instead makes its way through the centre of the village. On leaving the village to the east, the path continues through farmland before rejoining the river close to the village of Kempsford, which can be seen along with its distinctive church on the opposite bank.

=== Sections ===
Opened in 1996, the Thames Path is managed by National Trails who have separated it into individually numbered sections for management purposes. The 184-mile path starts numerically in London with Section 1 and finishes at the river's source in Gloucestershire with Section 64. Castle Eaton marks the boundary of two sections:

Section	Between
61	Castle Eaton and Hannington Bridge
62	Castle Eaton and Cricklade

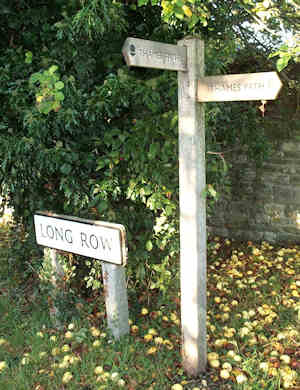
Section 61 – One of a number of signposts in the village showing the direction of the path

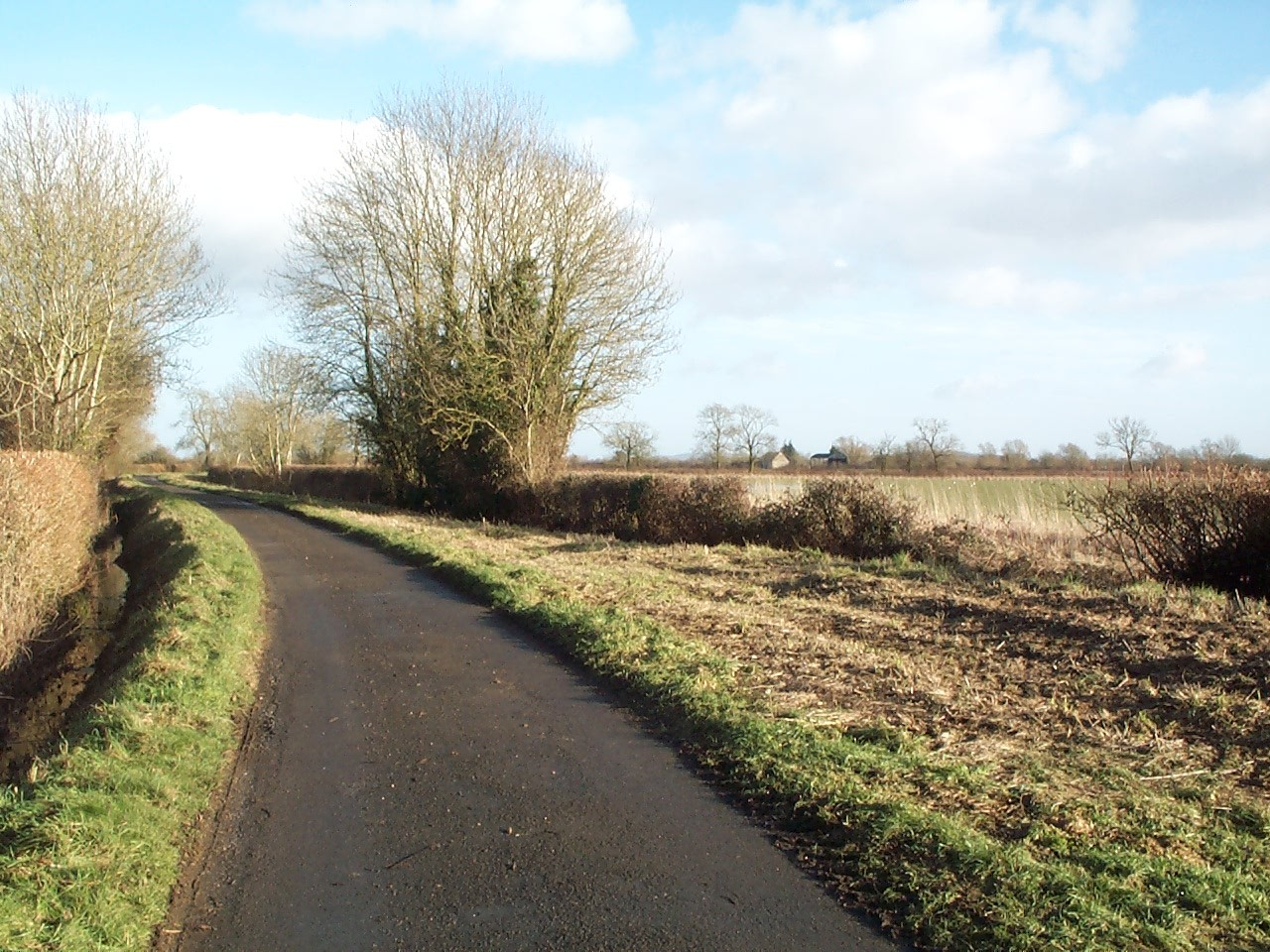
Section 61 – Away from the river, the path leaves Castle Eaton along Blackford Lane

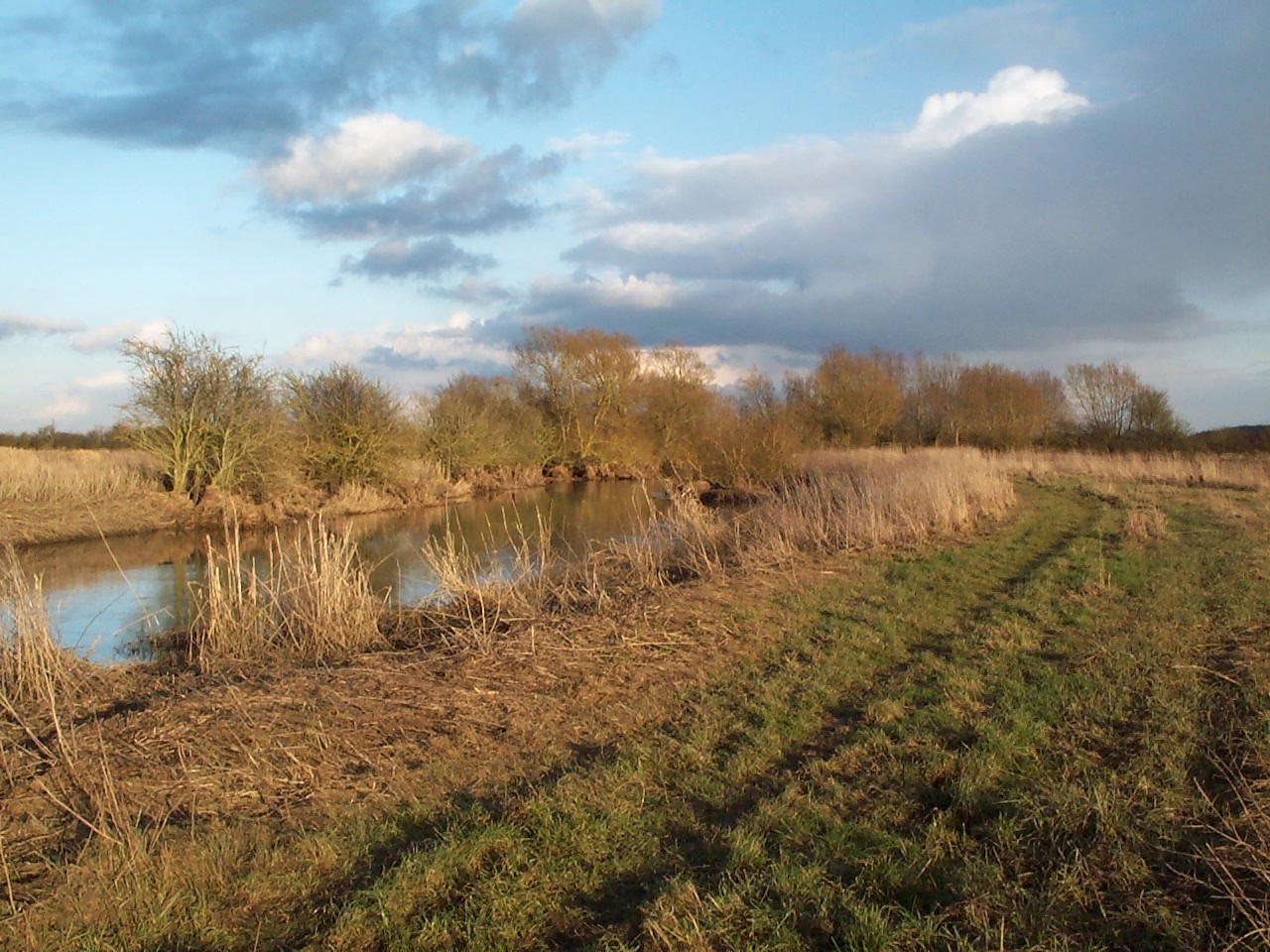
Section 61 – The path eventually rejoins the river on its way to Hannington Bridge

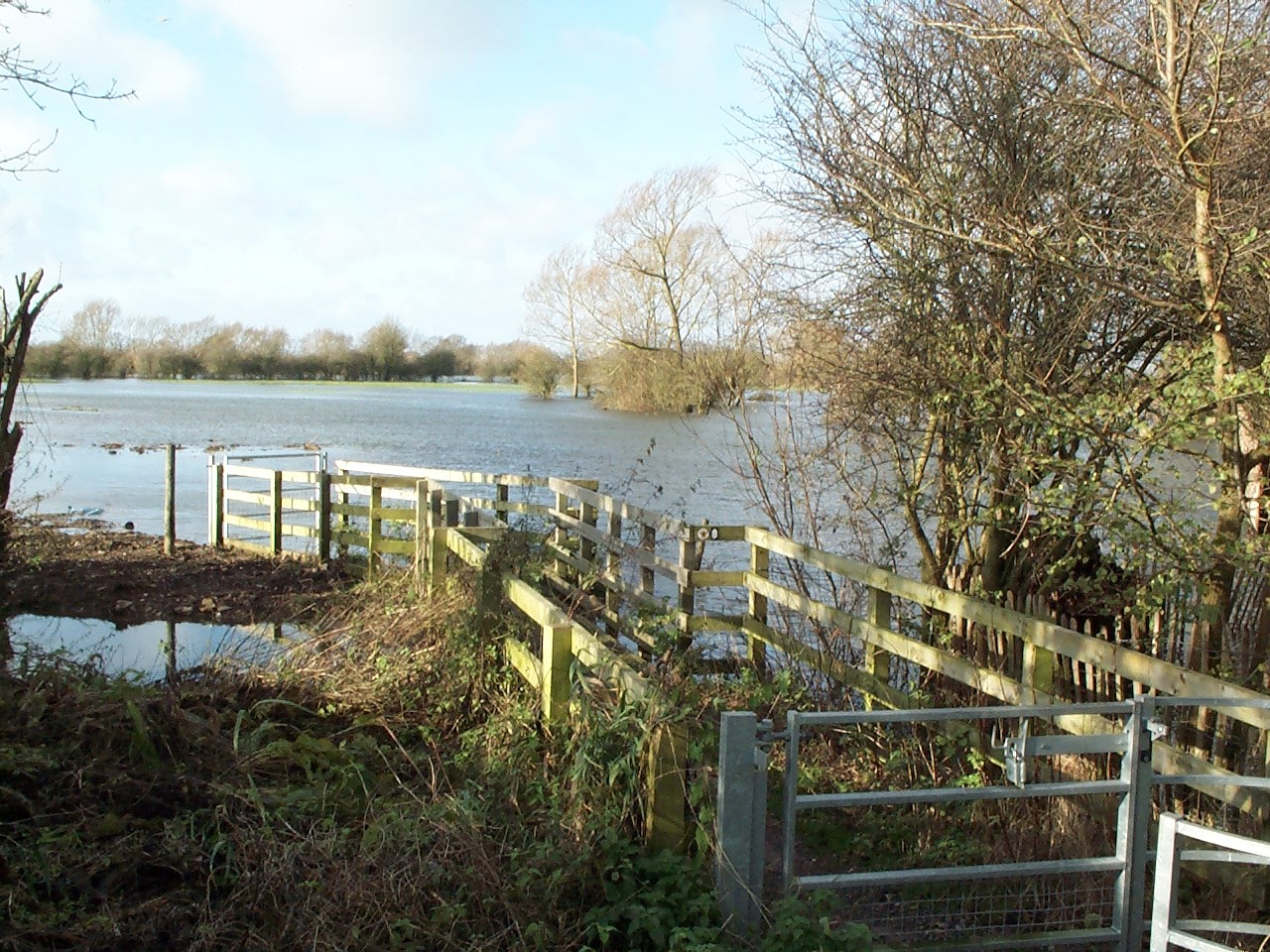
Section 62 – Looking west, heavy rainfall has flooded the route of the path

=== Flooding ===
Large areas of land through which sections 61 and 62 of the Thames Path pass are prone to flooding. This is more likely in winter but can occur in other seasons after heavy rain. Flooding can make parts of these sections impassable. One of the pictures above shows Section 62 of the path totally submerged, just west of Castle Eaton.

== See also ==
- Castle Eaton Bridge

== Sources ==
- Pevsner, Nikolaus (1975) [1963]. Cherry, Bridget (ed.). The Buildings of England: Wiltshire. Harmondsworth: Penguin Books. p. 154. ISBN 0-14-071026-4.
