= Hannington Bridge =

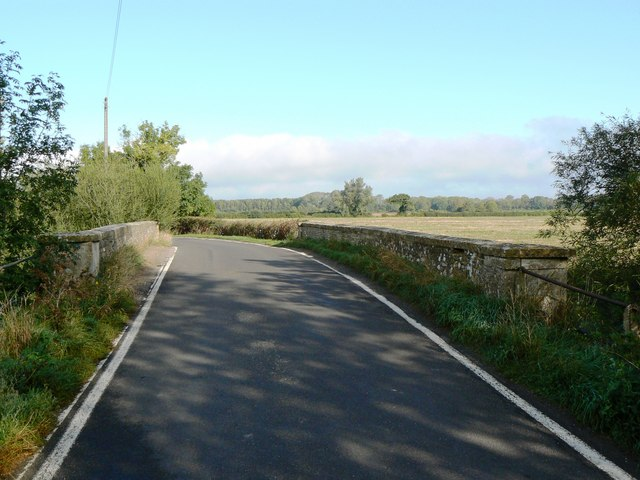
- Coordinates: 51.6632°N 1.7490°W
- Carries: Minor road
- Crosses: River Thames
- Locale: Hannington, Wiltshire

Characteristics
- Material: Stone
- No. of spans: 3
- Piers in water: 2

History
- Opened: 1841

Hannington Bridge is a road bridge across the River Thames in England. It carries a minor road between Kempsford in Gloucestershire and Hannington Wick in Wiltshire. It was built of stone in 1841, replacing an earlier wooden bridge.

The bridge comprises three small skew arches, with a causeway at either end with flood arches. The river is navigable to it for rowing boats from downstream Lechlade but the bridge is difficult for boats to negotiate as the river is fast and shallow.

== See also ==
- Crossings of the River Thames

Next crossing upstream	River Thames	Next crossing downstream
Castle Eaton Bridge (road)	Hannington Bridge	Footbridge at 51°41′18″N 1°42′16″W; Halfpenny Bridge (road)
