= Francis Popham =

Francis Popham may refer to:

- Sir Francis Popham (1573–1644), English soldier and colonizer
- Sir Francis Popham (1646–1674), English MP for Bath, grandson of the above
- Francis Popham (died 1734), English MP for Wootton Basset and Chippenham
- Francis Popham (cricketer) (1809–1880), Oxford University cricketer
