= Hannington railway station =

Former railway station in England

Hannington
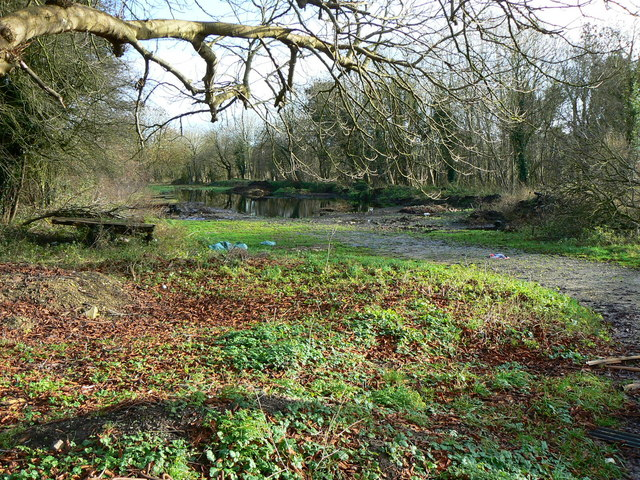
- Site of Hannington Station, Swindon

General information
- Location: Hannington, Swindon; England
- Coordinates: 51.625626°N 1.738481°W

Other information
- Status: Disused

History
- Original company: Great Western Railway
- Post-grouping: Great Western Railway

Key dates
- 9 May 1883: Opened
- 2 March 1953: Closed
Location

Hannington railway station is a former railway station near Hannington, in Wiltshire, England on the Highworth Branch Line from Swindon.

The station was about a mile southeast of Hannington village, near the Blunsdon to Highworth road; the platform had a small wooden building and there was a small goods yard. Much of the traffic was agricultural, milk in particular.

The line operated a passenger service from 9 May 1883 until 2 March 1953, and the branch closed to all traffic in 1962.

Although the majority of the station has disappeared the front of the platform is still visible.

Preceding station	Historical railways	Following station
Highworth; Line and station close	Great Western Railway; Highworth Branch Line	Stanton; Line and station closed
