= Eric Buller =

English cricketer and British Army officer (1894–1973)

Personal information
- Full name: Eric Tremayne Buller
- Born: 3 January 1894; Highworth, Wiltshire, England
- Died: 8 August 1973 (aged 79); Bath, Somerset, England
- Nickname: Eric Tremayne Buller-Leybourne-Popham
- Relatives: Francis Popham (grandfather); Redvers Buller (uncle)

Domestic team information
- Years: Team
- 1924–1931: Devon
- 1919: Army

Career statistics
Competition	First-class
Matches	1
Runs scored	58
Batting average	58.00
100s/50s	–/–
Top score	46
Balls bowled	66
Wickets	–
Bowling average	–
5 wickets in innings	–
10 wickets in match	–
Best bowling	–
Catches/stumpings	–/–
- Source: Cricinfo, 18 March 2011

Major Eric Tremayne Buller MC (3 January 1894 – 8 August 1973) was an English cricketer and decorated British Army officer.

== Early life and military career ==
Born in Highworth, Wiltshire, he was educated at Harrow School, where he represented the school cricket team. In the First World War, Buller served in the initially Devonshire Regiment. In May 1915, he was listed in the London Gazette as having attended the Royal Military College, Sandhurst, passing out to be commissioned as a second lieutenant into the Duke of Cornwall's Light Infantry. In the January 1917 Supplement to the London Gazette, Buller was listed as being promoted to temporary Lieutenant from the rank of 2nd Lieutenant that he held, this time in the Duke of Cornwall's Light Infantry. During the course of the Great War he was awarded the Military Cross. He later served in the 2nd Battalion Duke of Cornwall's Light Infantry as part of the British Rhine Army occupying the Rhineland. He eventually retired from the Army at some point prior to the Second World War, holding the rank of Major.

== Cricket career ==
Buller made his only first-class appearance following the war for the Army against the Cambridge University at Fenner's in 1919. In this match he scored 46 runs in the Army first-innings, before being dismissed by Arthur Gilligan. In their second-innings he scored an unbeaten 12 runs. With the ball he claimed 11 wicket-less overs. Buller played for the British Rhine Army, the occupying British force in Rhine Land, in 1922 against the Marylebone Cricket Club at Cologne. In 1924, he made his Minor Counties Championship debut for Devon against the Surrey Second XI. He represented Devon until 1926, and returned in 1931 to play a single match against Cornwall.

== Personal life ==
On 22 July 1922, he married Dorothy Bridget Tyrwhitt-Drake, with whom he had three daughters, Tresilla, Margaret and Belinda. Tresilla married Lt.-Col. Sir John Charles Arthur Digby Lawson, 3rd Bt (1912–2001). He changed his name to Eric Tremayne Buller Leyborne Popham on 15 October 1943. He died in Bath, Somerset on 8 August 1973. His grandfather Francis Leyborne Popham played first-class cricket for Oxford University and the Gentlemen of Kent.
