= Castle Eaton Bridge =

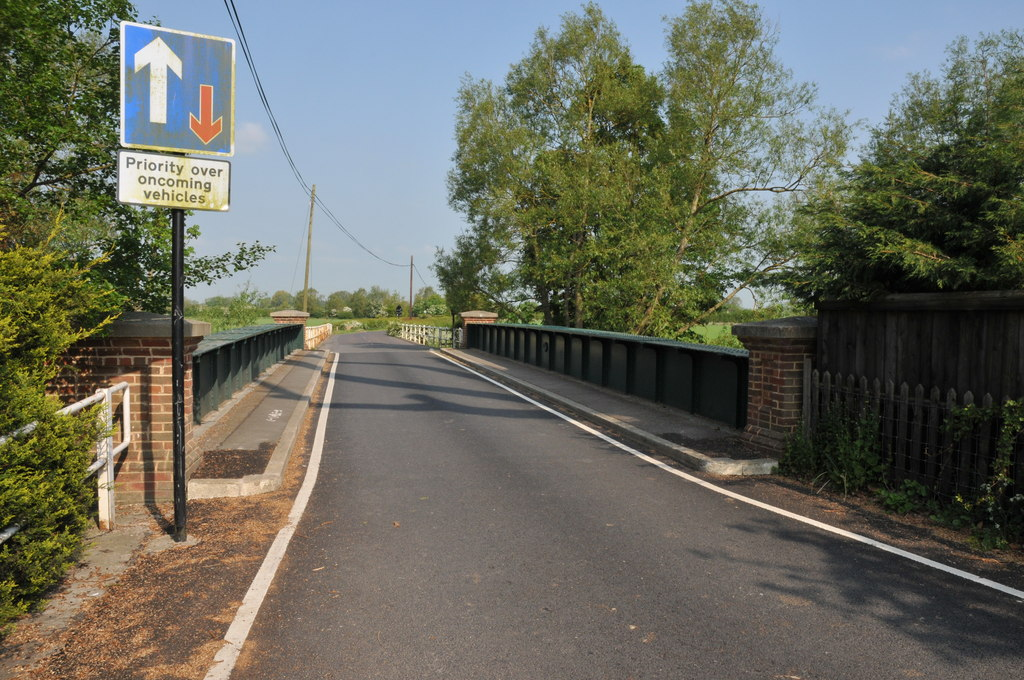
- Coordinates: 51°39′39″N 1°47′33″W
- Carries: Minor road
- Crosses: River Thames
- Locale: Castle Eaton, Wiltshire

Characteristics
- Design: Girder
- Material: Iron
- No. of spans: 1

History
- Opened: 1893; 132 years ago

Castle Eaton Bridge is a road bridge across the River Thames in England at Castle Eaton in Wiltshire. It carries a minor road between Cricklade, 4 miles to the southwest, and Kempsford 1 1/2 miles to the east.

The iron girder bridge with brick piers was built in 1893 with materials supplied by iron founders E Finch & Sons of Chepstow. It was described by Fred Thacker in 1920 "The present deplorable iron trough ... The Conservancy is often blamed for its hideousness; their responsibility amounts only to acquiescence; I understand the Swindon District Board was the actual artist". It was strengthened in 2001.

The bridge it replaced was of timber with stone piers and stone causeway.

== See also ==
- Crossings of the River Thames

Next crossing upstream	River Thames	Next crossing downstream
Water Eaton House Bridge (pedestrian)	Castle Eaton Bridge	Hannington Bridge (road)
