= St John the Baptist Church, Inglesham =

Coordinates: 51.68427°N 1.70441°W

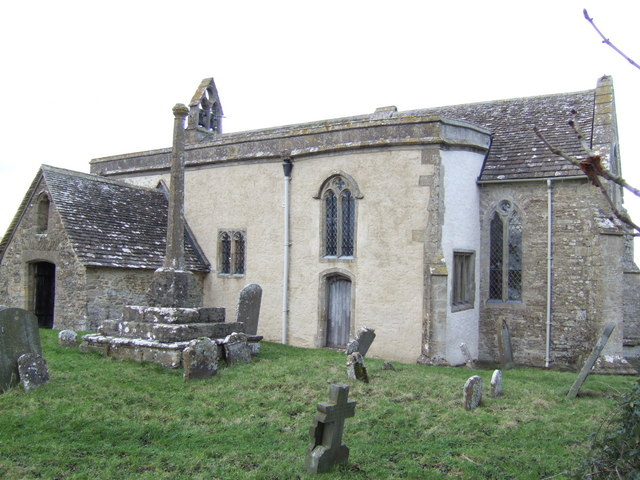
- St John the Baptist Church, Inglesham, from the south-east

- Location in Wiltshire
- OS grid reference: SU 20532 98431
- Location: Inglesham, Borough of Swindon, Wiltshire
- Country: England
- Denomination: Church of England
- Website: Churches Conservation Trust

History
- Dedication: Saint John the Baptist

Architecture
- Functional status: Redundant
- Heritage designation: Grade I
- Designated: 26 January 1955
- Architectural type: Church
- Style: Anglo-Saxon, Gothic

Specifications
- Materials: Rendered rubble stone, Stone roofs

Administration
- Province: Canterbury
- Diocese: Bristol
- Archdeaconry: Malmesbury
- Deanery: Swindon
- Parish: Highworth with Sevenhampton and Inglesham

St John the Baptist Church in Inglesham, near Swindon, Wiltshire, England, has Anglo-Saxon origins but most of the current structure was built around 1205. Much of the church has not changed since the medieval era. It is recorded in the National Heritage List for England as a Grade I listed building, and is now a redundant church which has been in the care of the Churches Conservation Trust since 1981.

The church stands above the water meadows next to the confluence of the River Thames, River Coln and the Thames and Severn Canal. Much of the fabric of the building is from the 13th century, but includes remains of an earlier church on the site. The interior has wall paintings spanning over 600 years, often one on top of the other, up to seven layers thick. There is also a carving of the Mother and Child which dates from the Anglo-Saxon era. There are also historic box pews, pulpit and memorials.

== History ==
In 1205 King John gave the church to the Cistercian monks of Beaulieu Abbey. In 1231 Pope Gregory IX granted a licence, appropriating the church at Inglesham, amongst others, to the abbey of Beaulieu at the request of Henry III.

In 1355, Inglesham manor and church were granted to a Leicester hospital, the College of the Annunciation of St. Mary.

In the 1880s, a major restoration of the church was planned. William Morris, an English textile designer, artist, writer, and socialist associated with the Pre-Raphaelite Brotherhood and the Arts and Crafts Movement, who lived 10 miles (16 km) away at Kelmscott in Oxfordshire, campaigned to save the building without unsympathetic alterations. This resulted not just in support but also, unusually, a fund-raising campaign by the Society for the Protection of Ancient Buildings (SPAB). The Society was established in 1877 and its manifesto, which Morris wrote, set out its principles "to stave off decay by daily care … and otherwise to resist all tampering with either the fabric or ornament of the building as it stands".

They employed J. T. Micklethwaite to oversee the work during 1888 and 1889. Oswald Birchall undertook a survey of the church which enabled Morris and John Henry Middleton to prepare a report for SPAB in 1885, suggesting the repairs be funded, as the rector George Woodbury Spooner said that it was beyond the means of the parishioners.

Further restoration by Percival Hartland Thomas was carried out in 1933 to replace the remains of the reredos from around 1330 in the chancel.

The church was declared redundant in April 1980 and vested in the Redundant Churches Fund (which has since become the Churches Conservation Trust) in October 1981.

== Architecture ==
The small church has no tower, but does have a 13th-century double bellcote, with pointed trefoiled lights, on the west gable of the nave. It contains two bells dated 1717, which were made by Abraham Rudhall, the founder of Rudhall of Gloucester. The masonry is limewashed, and surmounted by a parapet and head spouts. The walls are 26 inches (660 mm) thick and 21 feet (6.4 m) high. The church has a 25 by 13 feet (7.6 m × 4.0 m) aisled nave and an aisleless 21 by 12 feet (6.4 m × 3.7 m) chancel. The chancel replaced a previous one which was 12 feet (3.7 m) square and has a roof which includes tie beams which may date back to the 13th century. The nave has mediaeval queen post and wind brace roof, which is supported by two responds and a central pier.

The 15th-century cross outside the church has three steps to a high plinth with a pyramid stop-chamfer surmounted by a tall shaft with pyramid stop-chamfer and crested capping. It is listed at Grade II*.

=== Interior ===
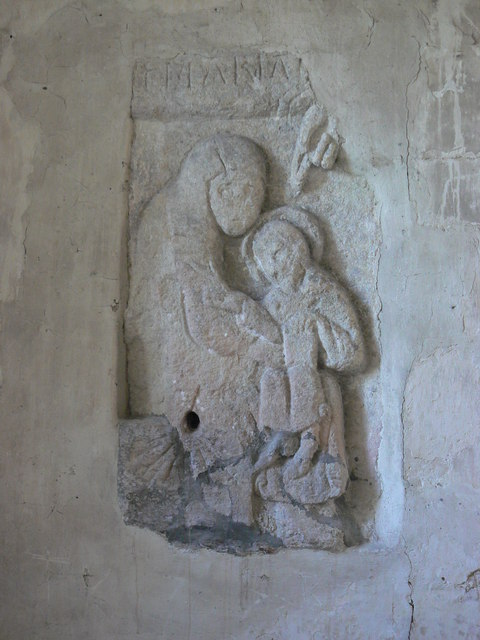
Anglo-Saxon carving of the Mother and Child which was previously a sundial on the outside of the church

The interior of the church contains wall paintings dating from the 13th to the early 19th centuries, some of which are illustrated in Professor E. W. Tristram's English Wall Painting of the Fourteenth Century. Tristram notes that fragments of a reredos survive with paintings of four saints on them, and he also comments on "crosses of rather elaborate design". Some wall paintings are on crumbling plaster behind painted post-Reformation texts; in places the paint is up to seven layers thick. There are 15th-century angels above the chancel arch and an early 14th-century Doom painting on the east wall of the north aisle. Victorian texts include the Ten Commandments, the Apostles' Creed and the Lord's Prayer. Restoration work on the paintings in 2010 led to access to the church being restricted.

There is a 42-by-24-inch (107 cm × 61 cm) carving of the Mother and Child in the south wall which dates from the time of the Anglo-Saxons. Until 1910, the carving was on the outside of the church attached to the south wall and used as a sundial. An incised meridian and other lines were added along with a hole for the gnomon of a scratch dial. Its original position in the church is not known, but may have been above the altar.

There are also parclose screens between the Carolean-style box pews that date from the Commonwealth era and a hanging pyx. The font is from the 15th century while the Jacobean pulpit and tester are from around 1630. There is a Tournai marble slab with a knight in the chancel which dates from around 1300. The piscina is from the 13th century with a trefoiled head, a shelf and a circular basin.

On the floor of the chancel is a 10-foot (3 m) black marble slab that once held the monumental brass of a 14th-century knight with a bascinet (helmet), sword and four shields.

== Parish ==
Inglesham benefice and parish were united with Highworth, some 4 miles (6 km) to the south, in 1940. Highworth parish remains responsible for the upkeep of the churchyard.

== Assessment ==
St John's was a particular favourite of John Betjeman, the poet, writer and broadcaster who was a founding member of the Victorian Society. Richard Taylor, presenter of BBC Four's Churches: How To Read Them, picked Inglesham as his favourite of the hundreds of churches he visited for the television programme, saying "It was a totally unassuming building, sat in the middle of the countryside. But, despite its humble appearance, inside, this church told the story of over 1,000 years of religious history – from Anglo-Saxon carvings on one wall, to medieval wall paintings on another and then passages from the Bible etched elsewhere from the Reformation". The programme also presented resistance by a local artist, William Morris, a founder of the Society for the Protection of Ancient Buildings, against Victorian redevelopment as a story of local campaigning in the 1880s.

== Gallery ==
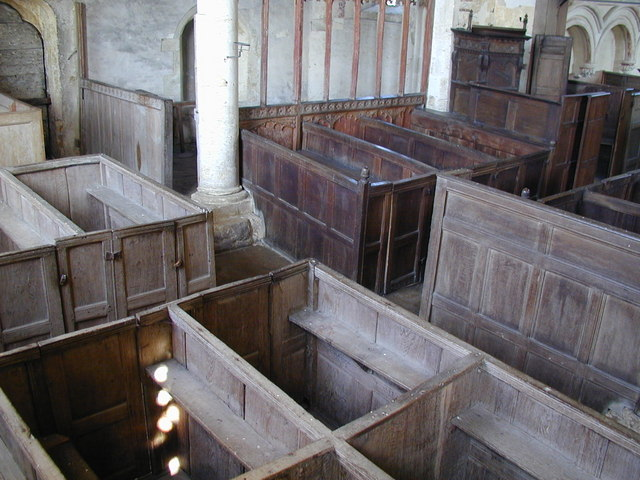
Box pews

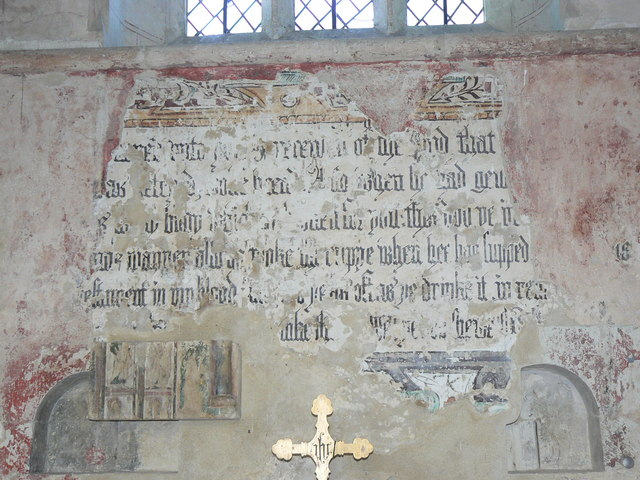
Wall painting

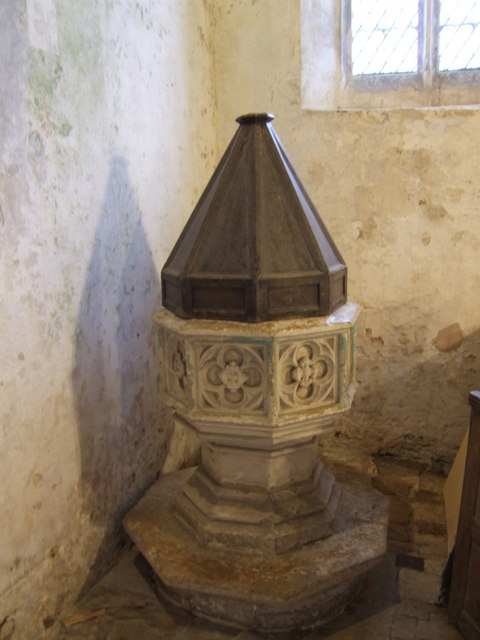
The font

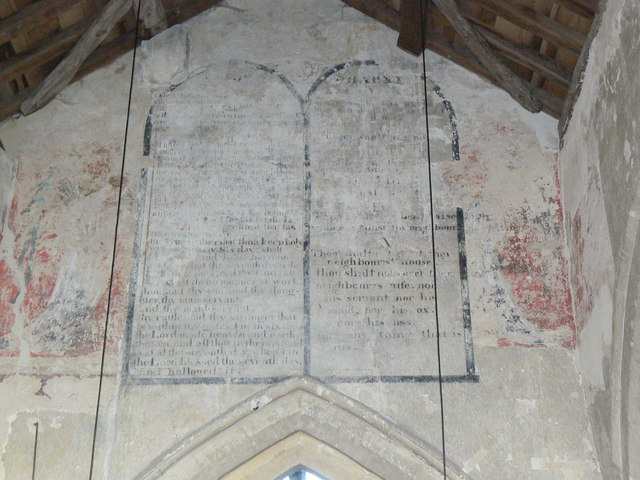
Mural of the Ten Commandments

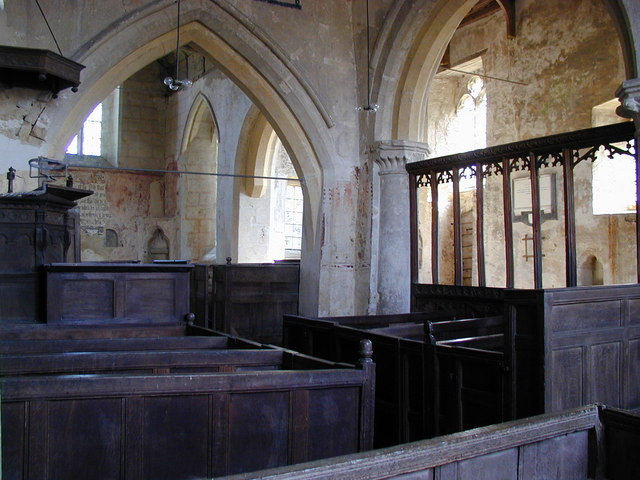
The interior

== See also ==
- List of churches preserved by the Churches Conservation Trust in Southwest England

== Sources ==
- Garside, Helen (2005). Inglesham Parish (PDF). Swindon: Swindon Borough Council. p. 3.
- Pevsner, Nikolaus; Cherry, Bridget (revision) (1975) [1963]. The Buildings of England: Wiltshire. Harmondsworth: Penguin Books. pp. 276–277. ISBN 0-14-071026-4.
- Tristram, E.W. (1955). Tristram, Eileen (ed.). English Wall Painting of the Fourteenth Century. London: Routledge & Kegan Paul. pp. 11, 29, 63.
