= Stratton Park Halt railway station =

Former railway station in England

Stratton Park Halt

General information
- Location: Stratton St Margaret, Borough of Swindon; England
- Coordinates: 51.5773°N 1.7381°W
- Platforms: 2

Other information
- Status: Disused

History
- Original company: Great Western Railway

Key dates
- 20 November 1933: Opened
- 7 December 1964: Closed
Location

Stratton Park Halt served the community of Stratton St Margaret, now part of the Borough of Swindon in Wiltshire, England. The station was on the main Great Western Railway line from London to Bristol which opened around 1840. The Beeching cuts brought its closure in 1964, by which time it was only served by five trains per day.

Preceding station	Historical railways	Following station
Swindon; Line and station open	Great Western Railway; Great Western Main Line	Shrivenham; Line open, station closed
