= Joseph Knight (cricketer) =

English cricketer

Personal information
- Full name: Joseph William Knight
- Born: 20 September 1896; Highworth, Wiltshire, England
- Died: 3 March 1974 (aged 77); Childrey, Oxfordshire, England
- Batting: Unknown
- Bowling: Unknown-arm fast-medium

Domestic team information
- Years: Team
- 1920–1923: Wiltshire
- 1921: Cambridge University

Career statistics
Competition	First-class
Matches	1
Runs scored	1
Batting average	0.50
100s/50s	–/–
Top score	1
Balls bowled	114
Wickets	0
Bowling average	–
5 wickets in innings	–
10 wickets in match	–
Best bowling	–
Catches/stumpings	–/–
- Source: Cricinfo, 28 June 2019

Joseph William Knight (20 September 1896 – 3 March 1974) was an English first-class cricketer.

Knight was born at Highworth, Wiltshire in September 1896. While studying at the University of Cambridge he made a single appearance in first-class cricket for Cambridge University against the British Army cricket team at Fenner's in 1921. Batting twice in the match, he was dismissed for a single run in the Cambridge first-innings by William Dickinson, while in their second-innings he was dismissed without scoring by Tom Jameson. Across the match he bowled 19 wicketless overs, conceding 53 runs. In addition to playing first-class cricket, Knight also played minor counties cricket for Wiltshire in 1920–23, making sixteen appearances in the Minor Counties Championship. He died in March 1974 at Childrey, Oxfordshire.
