= Stratton railway station =

Disused railway station in Swindon, England

Stratton
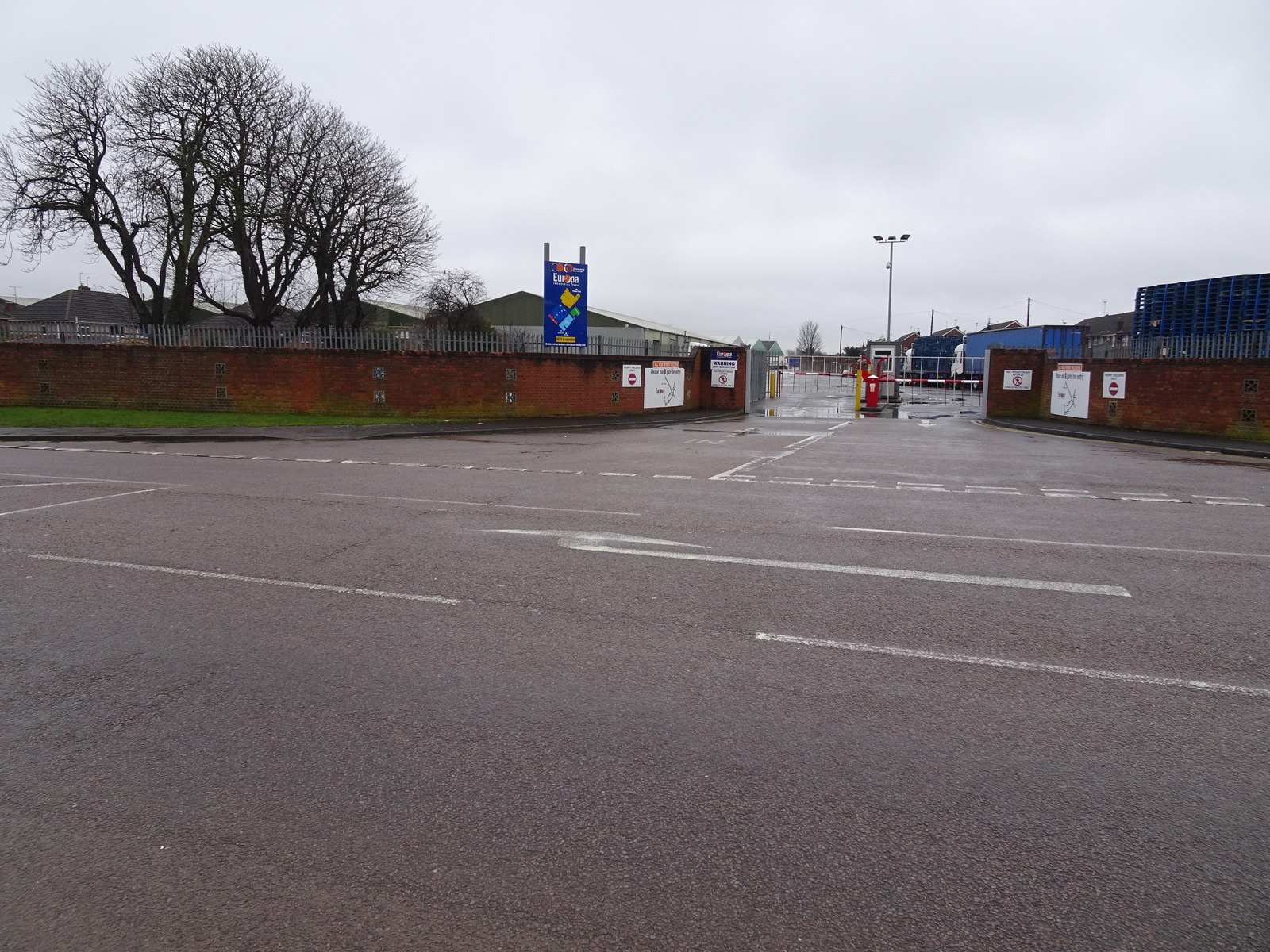
- The site of the station in 2018

General information
- Location: Stratton St Margaret, Wiltshire; England
- Coordinates: 51.5877°N 1.7554°W
- Grid reference: SU170876

Other information
- Status: Disused

History
- Original company: Great Western Railway
- Pre-grouping: Great Western Railway
- Post-grouping: Great Western Railway

Key dates
- 9 May 1883: Opened
- 2 March 1953: Closed for regular passenger trains
- 3 August 1962: complete closure
Location

Stratton railway station served the village of Stratton St Margaret, in the historic county of Wiltshire, England, from 1883 to 1953 on the Highworth branch line.

== History ==
The station was opened on 9 May 1883 by the Great Western Railway. It closed to passengers on 2 March 1953, although it was still used by employees of Swindon Works until 3 August 1962. Nothing remains.

Preceding station	Disused railways	Following station
Stanton; Line and station closed	Great Western Railway; Highworth branch line	Swindon; Line and station open
