= Stanton railway station =

Disused railway station in Standon Fitzwarren, Swindon

Stanton
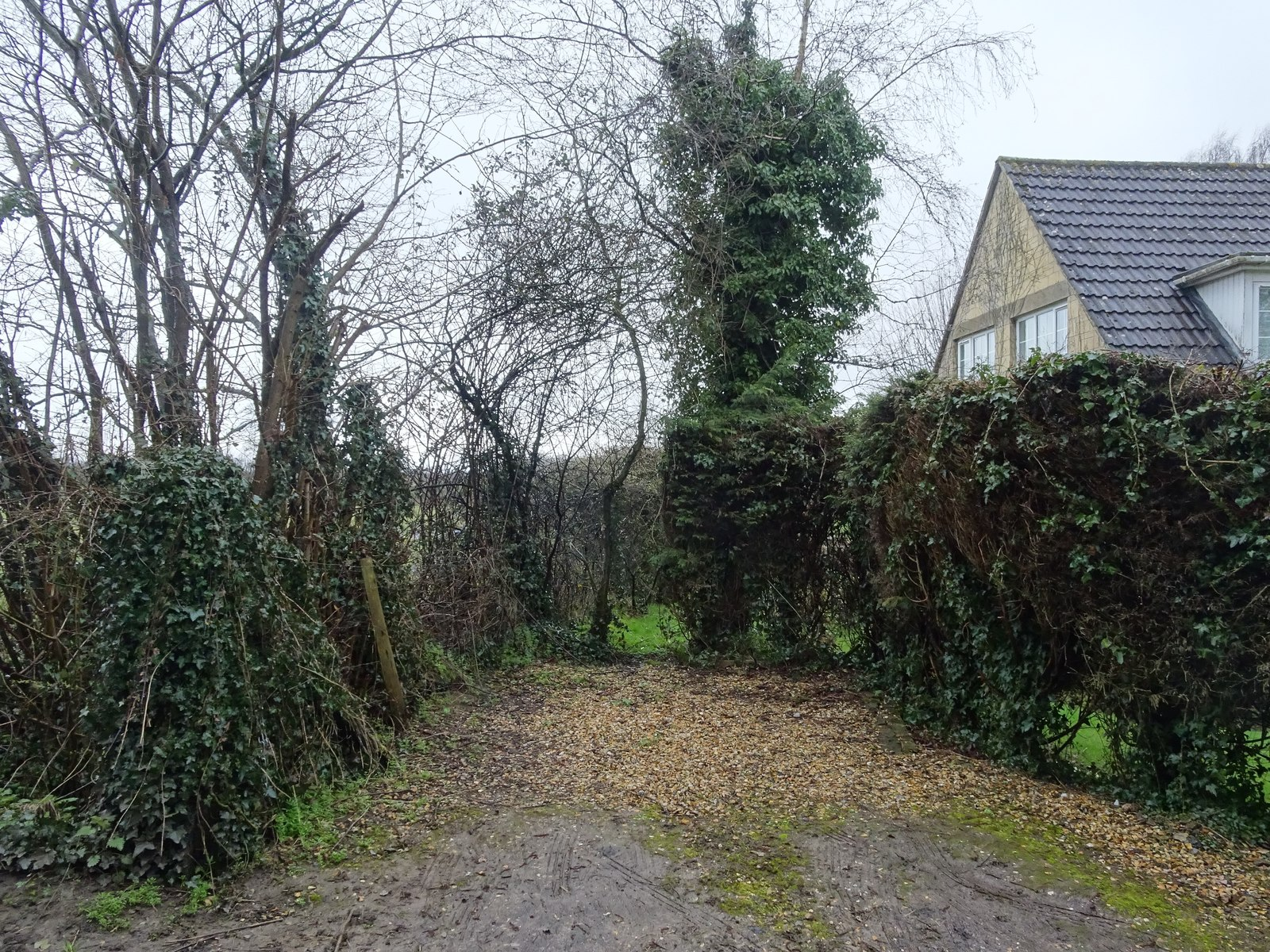
- The site of the station in 2018

General information
- Location: Stanton Fitzwarren, Wiltshire; England
- Coordinates: 51.6137°N 1.7505°W
- Grid reference: SU173905
- Platforms: 1

Other information
- Status: Disused

History
- Original company: Great Western Railway
- Pre-grouping: Great Western Railway
- Post-grouping: Great Western Railway

Key dates
- 9 May 1883: Opened
- 2 March 1953: Closed to passengers
- 1962: Closed completely
Location

Stanton railway station served the village of Stanton Fitzwarren, in the historic county of Wiltshire, England, from 1883 to 1962 on the Highworth branch line.

== History ==
The station was opened on 9 May 1883 by the Great Western Railway. It was known as Stanton Halt in the handbook of stations in 1949 and in Bradshaw in 1952. It closed on 2 March 1953. The last train ran on 3 August 1962, carrying employees of Swindon Works.

Preceding station	Disused railways	Following station
Hannington; Line and station closed	Great Western Railway; Highworth branch line	Stratton; Line and station closed
