= Highworth branch line =

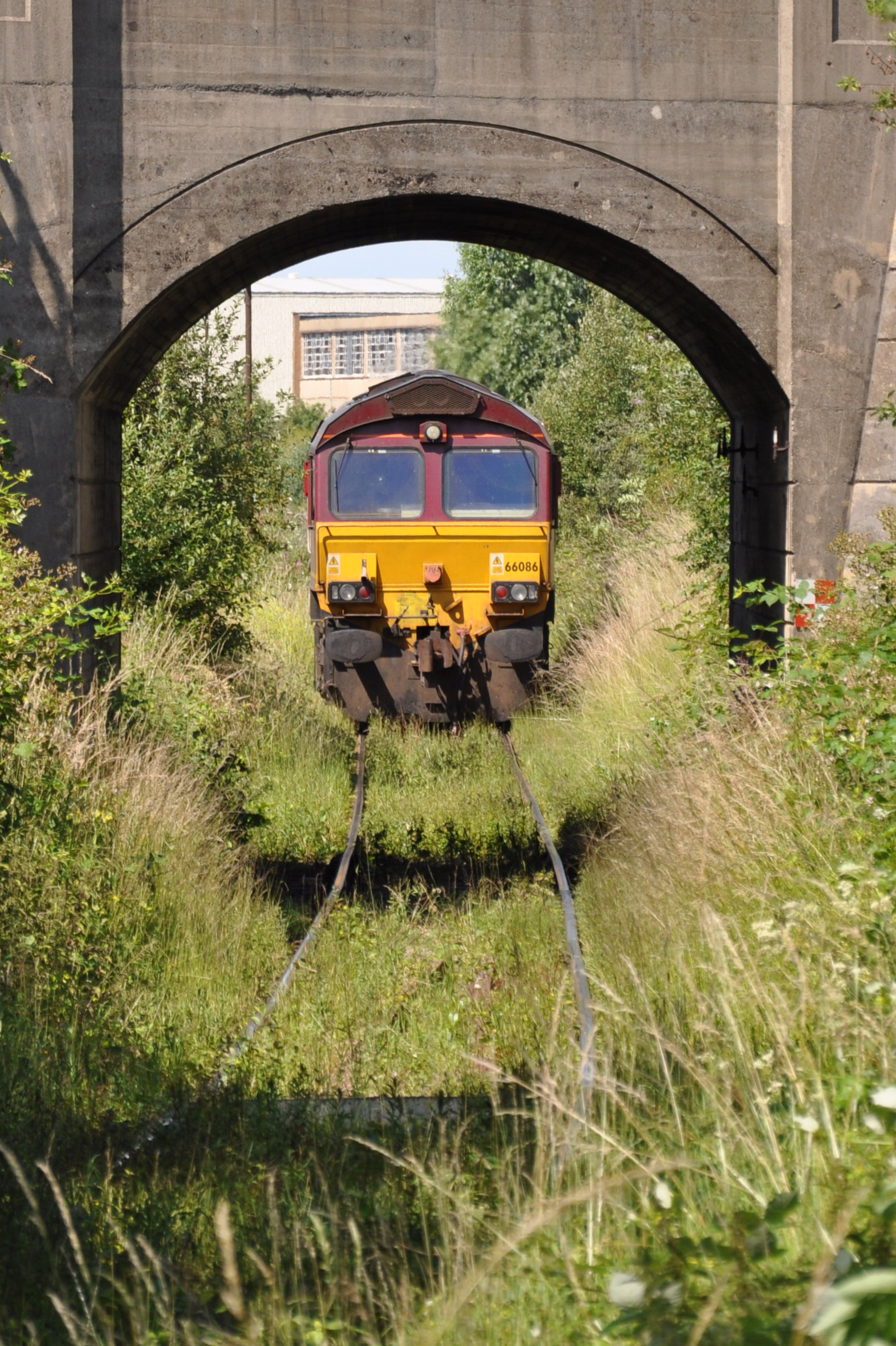
- A train at the start of the now-overgrown branch line

Service
- Type: Heavy rail

History
- Opened: 9 May 1883
- Closed: 2 March 1953 (passengers); 1962 (goods)

Technical
- Line length: 5 miles (8 km)
- Track gauge: 4 ft 8 1/2 in (1,435 mm) standard gauge

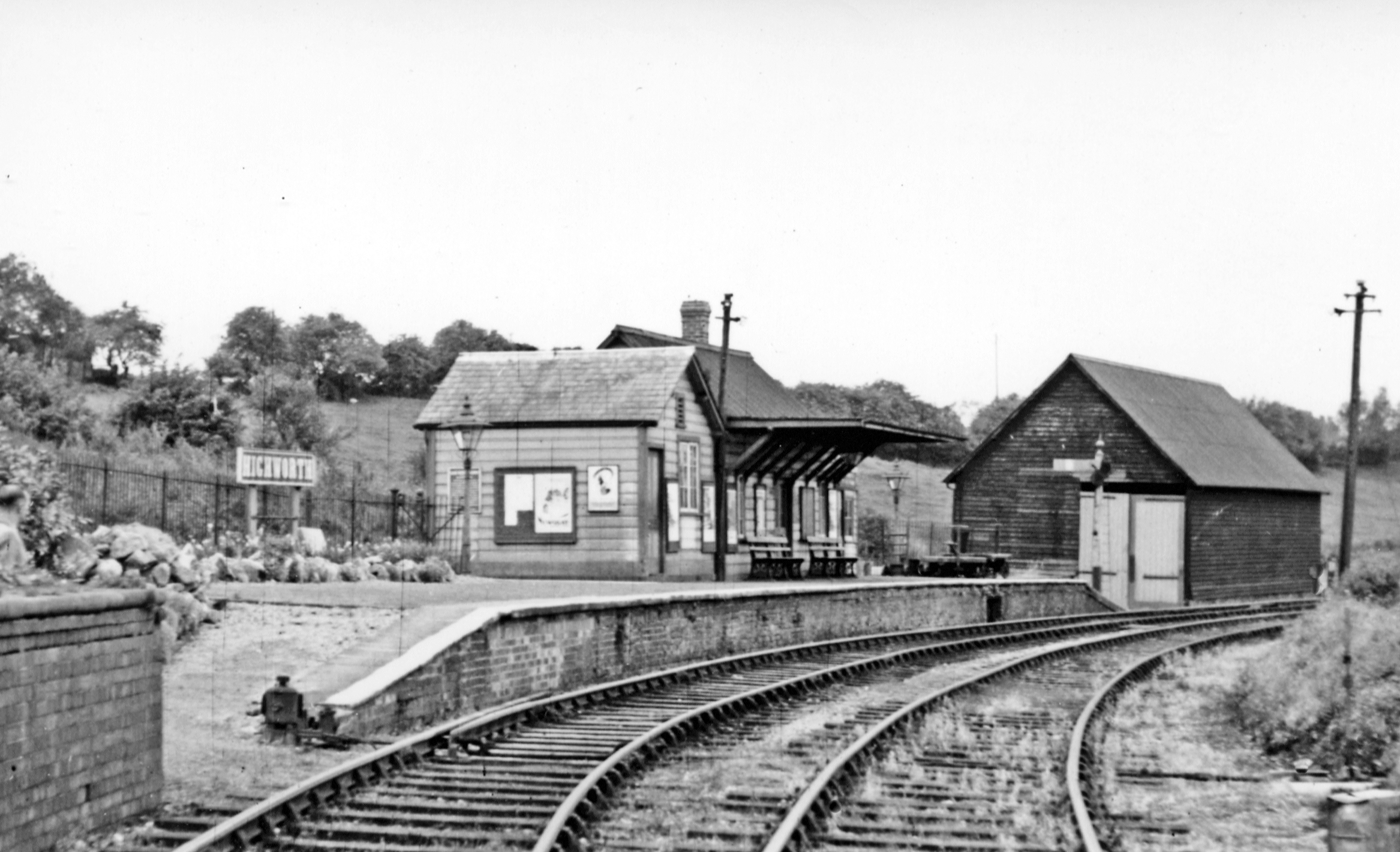
Highworth station in 1950

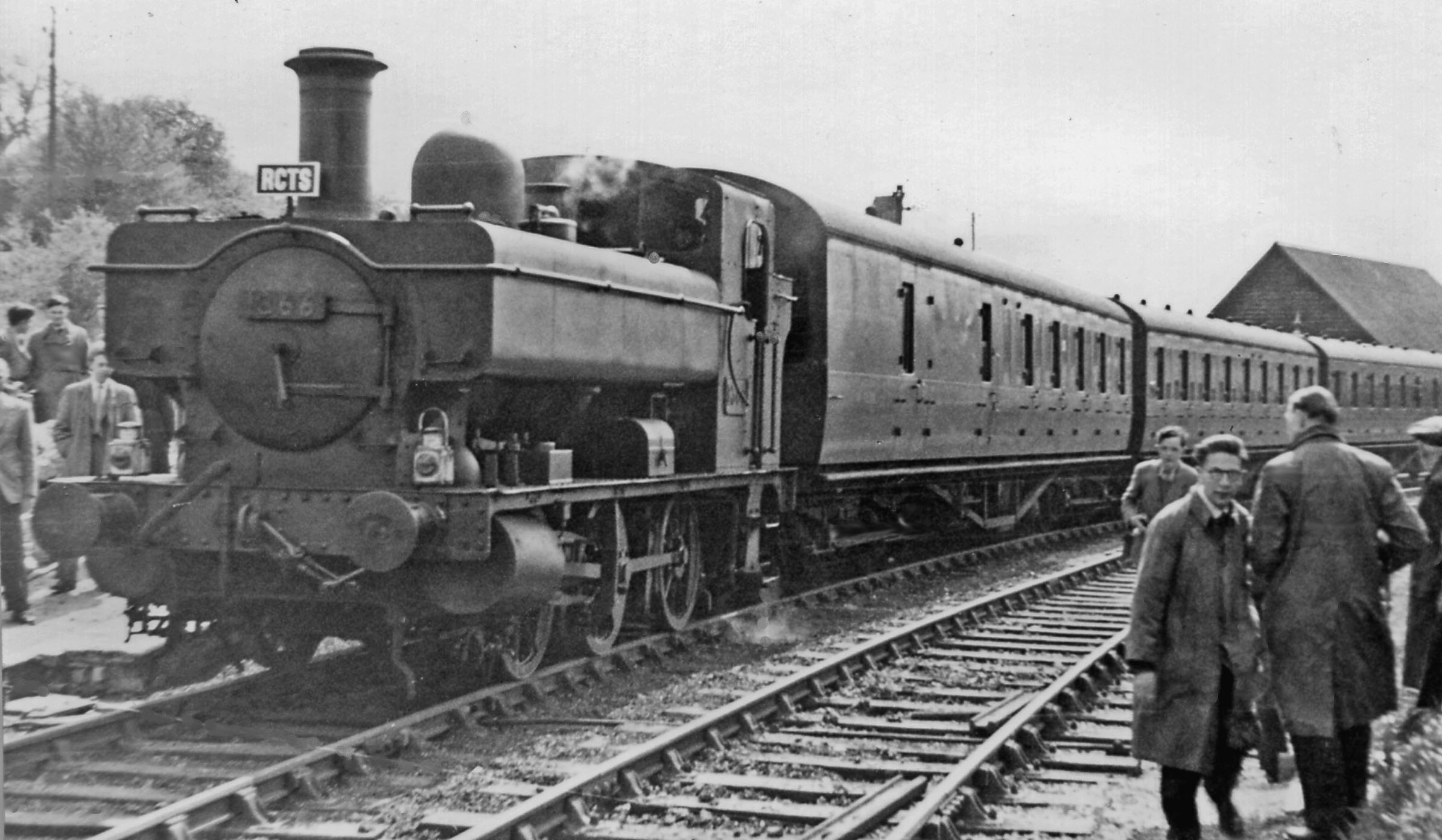
Rail Tour at Highworth in 1954

The Highworth branch line was a short railway branch line to the northeast of Swindon, England, in use from 1883 to 1962. It was most successful as a goods line, particularly during wartime when it linked the Great Western Main Line to factories around the town. A small vestigial part of the line exists for this purpose.

== Route ==
The line branched off the Great Western Main Line east of Swindon station. It ran northeast, with stations at Stratton, Stanton Fitzwarren and Hannington, terminating at Highworth, 5 miles (8 km) away.

== History ==
Swindon and Highworth Light Railway Act 1875
- Act of Parliament
- Parliament of the United Kingdom
- Long title: An Act for making a Railway from the Great Western Railway near Swindon to Highworth, all in the county of Wilts, to be called the Swindon and Highworth Light Railway; and for other purposes.
- Citation: 38 & 39 Vict. c. cxii

Dates
- Royal assent: 29 June 1875

Text of statute as originally enacted

There had been demands for railway access from Highworth since the mid-19th century. The town had been on one of the proposed routes of the Great Western Main Line before it was rerouted south to Swindon. In 1873, the Swindon and Highworth Light Railway Company was established to build the line, which was given approval on 21 June 1875 by the Swindon and Highworth Light Railway Act 1875 (38 & 39 Vict. c. cxii). Bad weather and difficulty in obtaining finance delayed the start of construction until 6 March 1879. The line was inspected by the Board of Trade on 5 March 1881, but significant improvements were required, such that the only way forward was sale of the line to the Great Western Railway (GWR). The improvements were made and the line was subsequently re-inspected on 30 April 1883.

The Highworth branch line operated a service for paying passengers from 9 May 1883 and for workers at the GWR factory in Swindon from January 1890. It became popular as a goods line in the early 20th century, as numerous industrial sites were established to the west of it at Stratton, including a Brunner Mond munitions factory in 1916. It was again important during World War II, when Stanton station served army camps in the area, and a spur was built to provide access to the new Vickers-Armstrongs aircraft factory. A passenger service for workers at the factory was provided from 1941 to 1944, and December 1956 to June 1957.

The line was not commercially successful as a passenger route. Following nationalisation, services were proposed to be withdrawn by British Railways in 1952 although the goods service would remain open. The public passenger service closed on 2 March 1953, while workmen's trains and goods services from Highworth to Kingsdown Road continued until 3 August 1962. The Vickers branch was retained until 2 June 1965, whilst a factory for Plessey was served until 13 July 1966. South of Stratton, Cooper's Metals Ltd. and Pressed Steel Co. Ltd. continued to be served.
