= Whelford Meadow =

Protected area in Gloucestershire, England

- Site of Special Scientific Interest
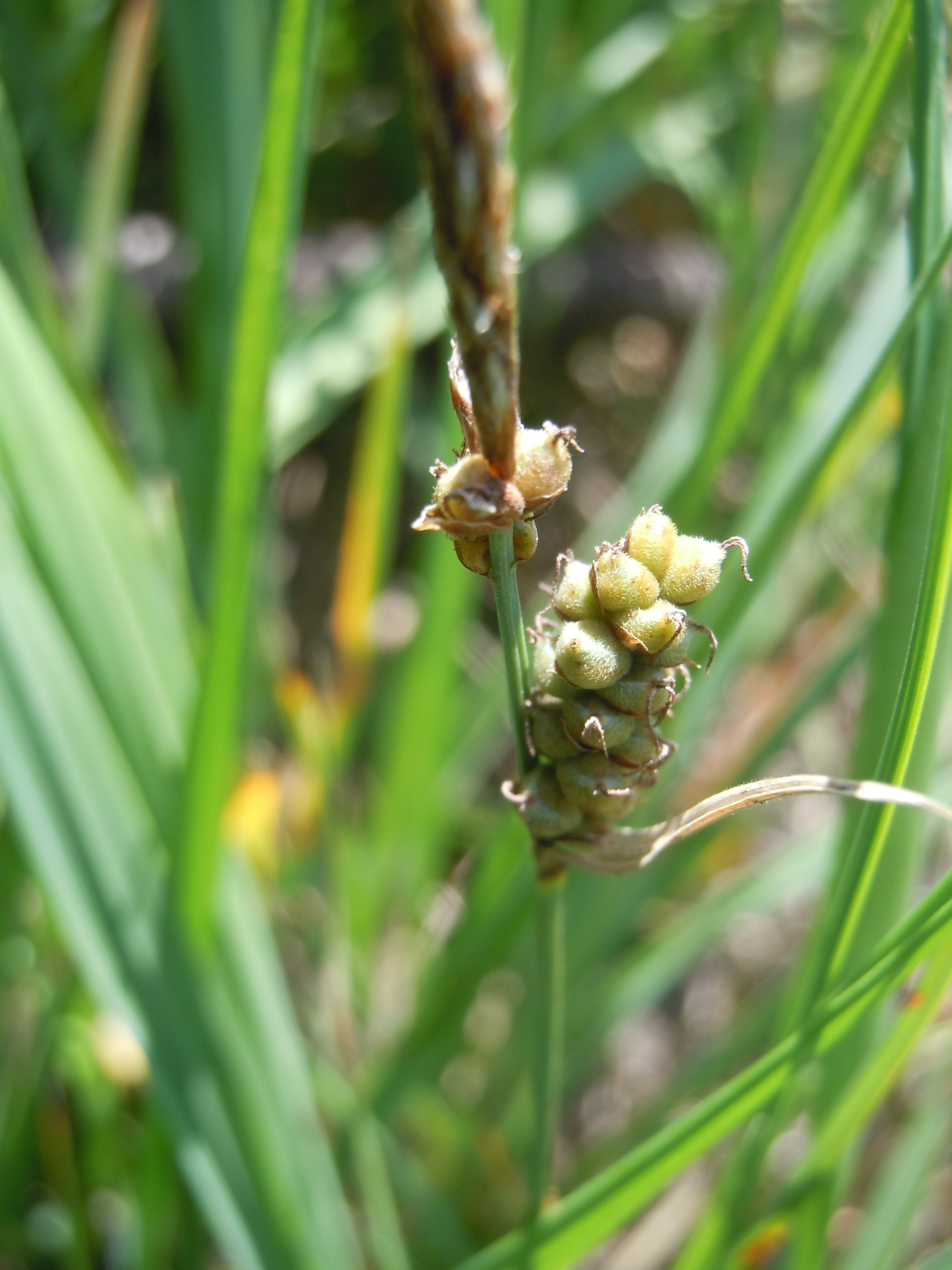
- Example - downy-fruited sedge (Carex tomentosa)

- Location within Gloucestershire
- Location of Whelford Meadow.
- Area of search: Gloucestershire
- Grid reference: SP168000
- Coordinates: 51.698946°N 1.757592°W
- Interest: Biological
- Area: 1.86 ha (4.6 acres)
- Notification date: 1985

Whelford Meadow (grid reference SP168000) is a 1.86-hectare (4.6-acre) biological Site of Special Scientific Interest in Gloucestershire, England, notified in 1985.

== Location and habitat ==
The site lies on the gravels of the Upper Thames basin. It is of significant importance as it contains two nationally rare plants as well as uncommon plants. It is grassland (as its name implies).

Whelford Pools (part of the Cotswold Water Park SSSI) are nearby. These are owned and managed by the Gloucestershire Wildlife Trust as a nature reserve.

== Flora ==
The meadow is dominated by species such as meadowsweet and common couch. A number of different species of sedge have been record and these include the nationally rare downey-fruited sedge (Carex tomentosa). Orchids present include southern marsh orchid. Adder's tongue flourishes on this site. The meadow supports fritillary which is nationally rare.

== Birds ==
The margins of the meadow are scrubland and this area provides cover for breeding birds such as warblers.

== SSSI Source ==
- Natural England SSSI information on the citation
- Natural England SSSI information on the Whelford Meadow unit
