= Highworth =

Market town in Wiltshire, England

Coordinates: 51.631°N 1.712°W

- Town and civil parish
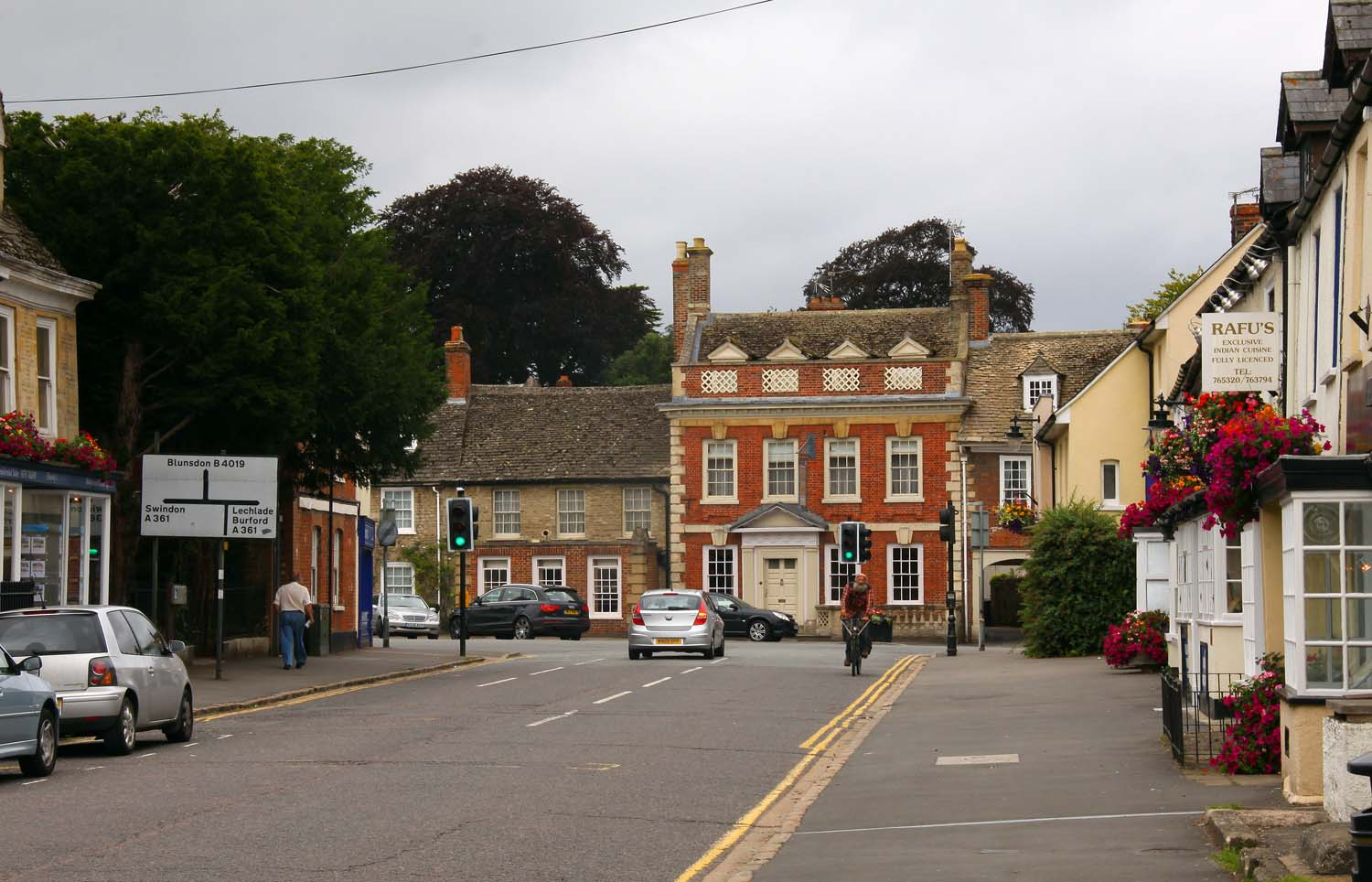
- West end of the High Street, 2011

- Location within Wiltshire
- Population: 8,258 (2021 Census)
- OS grid reference: SU200925
- Civil parish: Highworth
- Unitary authority: Borough of Swindon
- Ceremonial county: Wiltshire
- Region: South West
- Country: England
- Sovereign state: United Kingdom
- Post town: Swindon
- Postcode district: SN6
- Dialling code: 01793
- Police: Wiltshire
- Fire: Dorset and Wiltshire
- Ambulance: South Western
- UK Parliament: Swindon North
- Website: Town Council

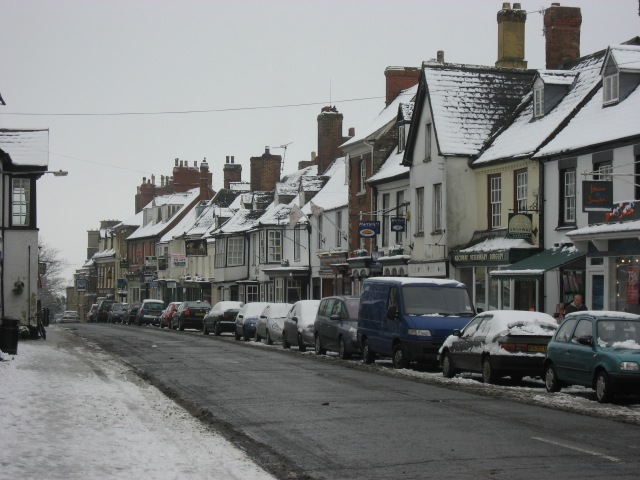
High Street on a winter's day

Highworth is a market town and civil parish in the Borough of Swindon, England, about 6 miles (10 km) north-east of Swindon town centre. The 2021 Census recorded a population of 8,258. The town is notable for its Queen Anne and Georgian buildings, dating from its pre-eminence in the 18th century. It also has a 13th-century church, St. Michael and All Angels. The parish includes Sevenhampton village and the hamlets of Hampton and Redlands.

== History ==
Highworth is on a hill in a strategic position above the Upper Thames Valley, and seems to have been occupied almost continuously for 7,000 years. It is mentioned in the Domesday Book of 1086 as 'Wrde', which derives from the Old English word 'worth' meaning enclosure. At that time there were six households and a church. The prefix 'High', owing to it being situated on a hill, was not added until around 1200 AD. On John Speed's map of Wiltshire (1611), the name is spelt both Highwoth (for the hundred) and Hiworth (for the town itself). In 1206 it was granted a charter for its market, which is still held weekly. The origins and layout of Highworth are medieval.

Highworth's martyr, John Goodson, a Lollard, was burned at the stake for heresy at Lammas (1 August) in 1508. He was a miller who lived and carried out his business at Maggot Mill, Fresden (the word maggot here means "lively" and refers to the water used to power his mill, not to the state of his flour). The site of his martyrdom was roughly in the area now occupied by King's Avenue and the back of Southfield School. Lammas was the time when one of two annual fairs was held in Highworth, so news of this event would have been carried far and wide.

Highworth was a Royalist stronghold in the English Civil War, but on 17 June 1645 Sir Thomas Fairfax captured it and Parliamentarian troops garrisoned it until October the next year. The occupation coincided with a severe outbreak of plague. Traders moved their business to Swindon, and Highworth market did not recover until the end of that century. Highworth benefited from the economic boom in the Napoleonic Wars and Industrial Revolution, and many of the houses in the town centre date from this time. From 1894 to 1974 there was a Highworth Rural District but the town is now part of Swindon unitary authority. Highworth was once larger than neighbouring Swindon, when Highworth's population exceeded 12,000.

== Geography ==
Highworth is in north-east Wiltshire, near the border with Oxfordshire. The town stands on a hill above the upper Thames Valley, and at 436 ft (133 m) above sea level is the highest town in Wiltshire. It is 6 miles (10 km) north-east of Swindon and 69 miles (111 km) west of London.

== Governance ==
The first tier of local government is Highworth Town Council, which has 15 elected councillors. Other local government functions are carried out by Swindon Borough Council, a unitary authority. Three councillors are elected to that body to represent the Blunsdon and Highworth ward, a large area in the north of the borough; besides Highworth the ward spans Inglesham, Hannington, Castle Eaton, Blunsdon and Stanton Fitzwarren parishes. The ward falls within the Swindon North parliamentary constituency, which has been held since 2024 by Will Stone for the Labour Party.

Between 1894 and 1974, the parish was part of Highworth Rural District.

== Landmarks ==
The Church of England parish church of St Michael (see below) is at the centre of the town, at the corner of the High Street and the A361 Swindon Road. The centre of the old town, with many fine Georgian and Queen Anne houses, has been a conservation area since 1976.

The Old Manor House in the High Street, parts of which date back to the late 15th century, is a Grade II* listed building.

== Transport ==
Highworth was the terminus of a Great Western Railway branch line from Swindon, the Highworth branch line, which was closed to passengers in 1953 and to goods in 1962. Nowadays, the nearest station is at Swindon, 6 miles (10 km) to the southwest. The Great Western Main Line passes through open countryside around 3 miles south of the town, en route to Reading and London.

The A361 road forms a north–south route through Highworth, while the B4019 is on an east–west axis passing through the suburb of Hampton.

== Education ==
Highworth Warneford School is a secondary school on Shrivenham Road. Southfield Junior School borders it, and Eastrop Infant School is nearby. Westrop Primary and Nursery School serves pupils on the west side of the town.

== Churches ==
=== Parish church ===
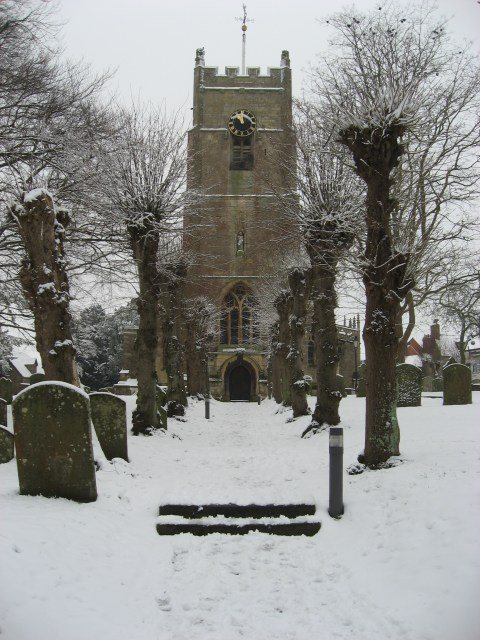
St Michael's Parish Church in winter

A church was recorded in the Domesday Book of 1086. The oldest parts of the present church of St Michael and All Angels imply a cruciform church of the 13th century: the chancel has an original lancet window on its north side; the four-bay nave arcades are also from the 13th century, although thought to have been raised in the 15th; and the south porch has a 13th-century arch. Set into the south wall above the door is a tympanum with carving from c.1150, probably depicting Samson wrestling a lion.

The church was remodelled in the late 15th century. The font is from c.1500, and the elaborate pulpit is from the 17th century although much restored. Restoration in 1861–1862 by J. W. Hugall included the rebuilding of most of the crossing, including the chancel arch and north arch; his south window in the chancel mimics the triple lancet that it replaced, and three other windows were made by Wailes. The 1935 east window is by Harold Brakspear. The 1937 east window by Townshend and Howson depicts St Michael and a dragon. The church was designated as Grade I listed in 1955.

The Warnford chapel on the south side of the chancel has memorials from the 17th to 19th centuries, described by Historic England as "an imposing array ... chiefly significant for their contrasting styles of inscriptions". Late medieval wall paintings depicting Saint Eligius were uncovered and then destroyed during the 1860s restoration. Three tracings made in 1861 are held by Wiltshire Museum.

The tall west tower with full-height diagonal buttresses carries a clock and a ring of eight bells, two of them cast in 1689 by Henry II Bagley. The buttresses are capped with bear and staff emblems, for John Dudley, 1st Duke of Northumberland; they are modern copies of the originals, which in 1955 were said to be stored in the tower. The diocesan architect C. E. Ponting, writing in 1898, called the tower "fine" and noted that only the west aspect is faced with ashlar, while the other sides are in rubble stone. Until the 17th century there was also a crossing tower. Julian Orbach, in his updating of Nikolaus Pevsner's architectural guide, notes similarities to St Mary's Church, Purton, also in north Wiltshire, which has two towers and a hall-like interior.

In 2018–2019, the church was closed for ten months for internal modernisation. The pews and tiled floors of 1862 were removed, although the tiles were retained in the sanctuary and in the Warneford chapel, and some pews were moved into the chapel. Underfloor heating was installed to replace the 1890s system made by Skinner and Broad, iron-founders of Bristol, which used cast iron pipes. The 1932 rood screen by Brakspear was moved beneath the tower, the heating, lighting and organ were replaced, a kitchen installed, and a toilet block added on the north side.

==== Parish ====
The church was a prebend of Salisbury by c.1150. Prebendaries included William de la Corner, who went on to be consecrated bishop of Salisbury in 1289; and, from 1509, James Denton.

South Marston church was anciently a chapelry of Highworth, until a separate parish was created for it in 1889. Sevenhampton was also a chapelry of Highworth.

The benefice and parish of Highworth with Sevenhampton were united with those of Inglesham in 1940. Hannington was added to the benefice in 1956, and at some point Broad Blunsdon came under the responsibility of the same clergy. Inglesham church was declared redundant in 1980 and is now in the care of the Churches Conservation Trust, although St Michael's parish manages the churchyard. Today, the name of the parish continues as 'Highworth with Sevenhampton and Inglesham'.

==== Churchyard ====
Historic England describe the churchyard as a "well stocked graveyard with numerous headstones and table tombs from the C17 to C19". The parish war memorial, a tall lantern cross erected in 1921 and further inscribed after the Second World War, stands at the east entrance.

=== Other churches ===
Two Methodist chapels were built in 1838 and 1842. The first one proved too small so a new one was built on the Elms in 1856. In 1964 the two congregations combined to build a larger chapel on the current site. This church was in turn enlarged in 1992.

The Highworth United Reformed Church is on the High Street. Highworth Community Church, an independent church founded in 1981 as part of the charismatic movement, meets at various venues including Highworth Warneford School.

== Culture and community ==
The town is twinned with Pontorson in Normandy and Wassenberg in Germany. Highworth Community Centre opened in the former Northview Primary School in June 2011.

== Media ==
Local news and television programmes are provided by BBC South and BBC West on BBC One, and by ITV Meridian and ITV West Country on ITV1. Television signals can be received from either the Oxford or Mendip TV transmitters.

Local radio stations are BBC Radio Wiltshire on 103.6 FM, Heart West on 97.2 FM, Greatest Hits Radio South West (formerly Sam FM) on 107.7 and Swindon 105.5, a community based radio station, broadcasts from its studios in Swindon on 105.5 FM.

The Swindon Advertiser and Gazette and Herald are the local newspapers that serve the town.

== Sport ==
Highworth Town F.C. is a Non-League football club that plays at the Elms Recreation Ground.

Highworth Cricket Club are in the Wiltshire County Cricket League and South Gloucestershire and Wiltshire Village League (Sundays). The club play at the Elms Recreation Ground.

== Public services ==
Highworth was first recorded as a post town in 1673. From 1835 to 1839 there was a Penny Post between Highworth and Cold Harbour, a village on the Swindon – Cirencester road near Broad Blunsdon. Mrs Mabel Stranks, who was postmistress here in the Second World War, was a key contact for members of the Auxiliary Units, a resistance organisation. A memorial plaque on the wall of the former post office records her contribution.

== Notable people ==
- Samuel Wilson Warneford (1763–1855), philanthropist, from the family who owned much land at Sevenhampton
- Kate Lucy Ward, later Bridgen Carter (1829–1915), composer, born at Highworth
- William Goudge (1877–1967), cricketer
- Eric Buller (1894–1973), British Army officer and cricketer; born at Highworth
- Joseph Knight (1896–1974), cricketer
- William Joscelyn Arkell (1904–1958), geologist and palaeontologist, leading authority on the Jurassic; born at Highworth
- Helen Shapiro, singer, lived at Highworth for a time after her marriage
