= Shrivenham railway station =

Former railway station in England

Coordinates: 51.5868°N 1.6585°W

Shrivenham
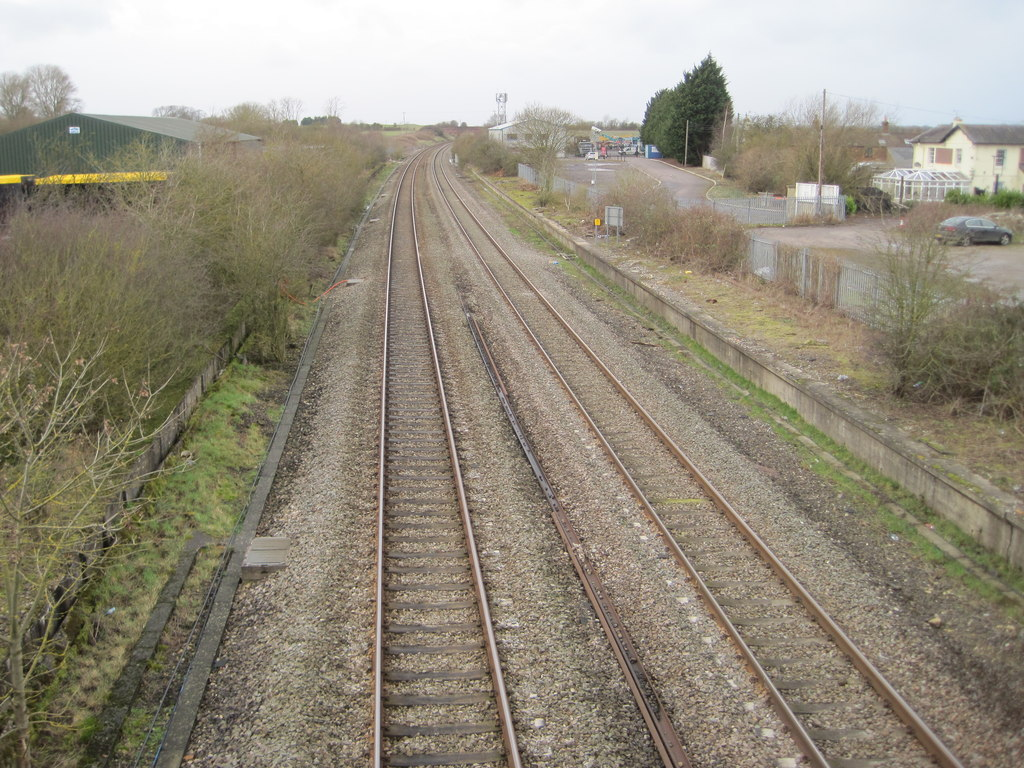
- The site of the station in 2014

General information
- Location: Shrivenham, District of Vale of White Horse; England
- Grid reference: SU237875
- Platforms: 2

Other information
- Status: Disused

History
- Original company: Great Western Railway
- Pre-grouping: GWR
- Post-grouping: GWR; Western Region of British Railways

Key dates
- 17 December 1840: Opened
- 7 December 1964: Closed
Location

Shrivenham railway station was a station on the Great Western Main Line serving the village of Shrivenham in what was then part of Berkshire.

== History ==
The station was about 3/4 mile (1.2 km) south of the village, on the west side of the B4000 Station Road, south of the Wilts & Berks Canal, and 5 miles 1,056 yards (9 km) along the line east of Swindon.

The main station building was built in 1840. It was very small, faced with flint, had Tudor style windows and a roof that projected in the form of a canopy.

On 10 May 1848 six passengers were killed and 13 injured at Shrivenham when two porters pushed a horse-box and cattle van onto the main line to free a waggon turntable. The Exeter express struck them; the locomotive was undamaged but the side of the leading coach was torn out killing six passengers and injuring 13 more.

On 15 January 1936 an express from Penzance, hauled by GWR 6000 Class 4-6-0 No. 6007 King William III, collided with some coal wagons just outside the station that had become detached from an earlier train hauled by GWR 2800 Class 2-8-0 No. 2802. Two people (the male driver and a female passenger) were killed and 10 injured.

On 7 December 1964 British Railways withdrew passenger services from Shrivenham and all other intermediate stations between Didcot and Swindon. The station buildings were demolished in 1965 but remnants of the platforms survived.

The station building is described and shown in some detail in the 1962 John Betjeman documentary, "Men of Steam".

== Routes ==
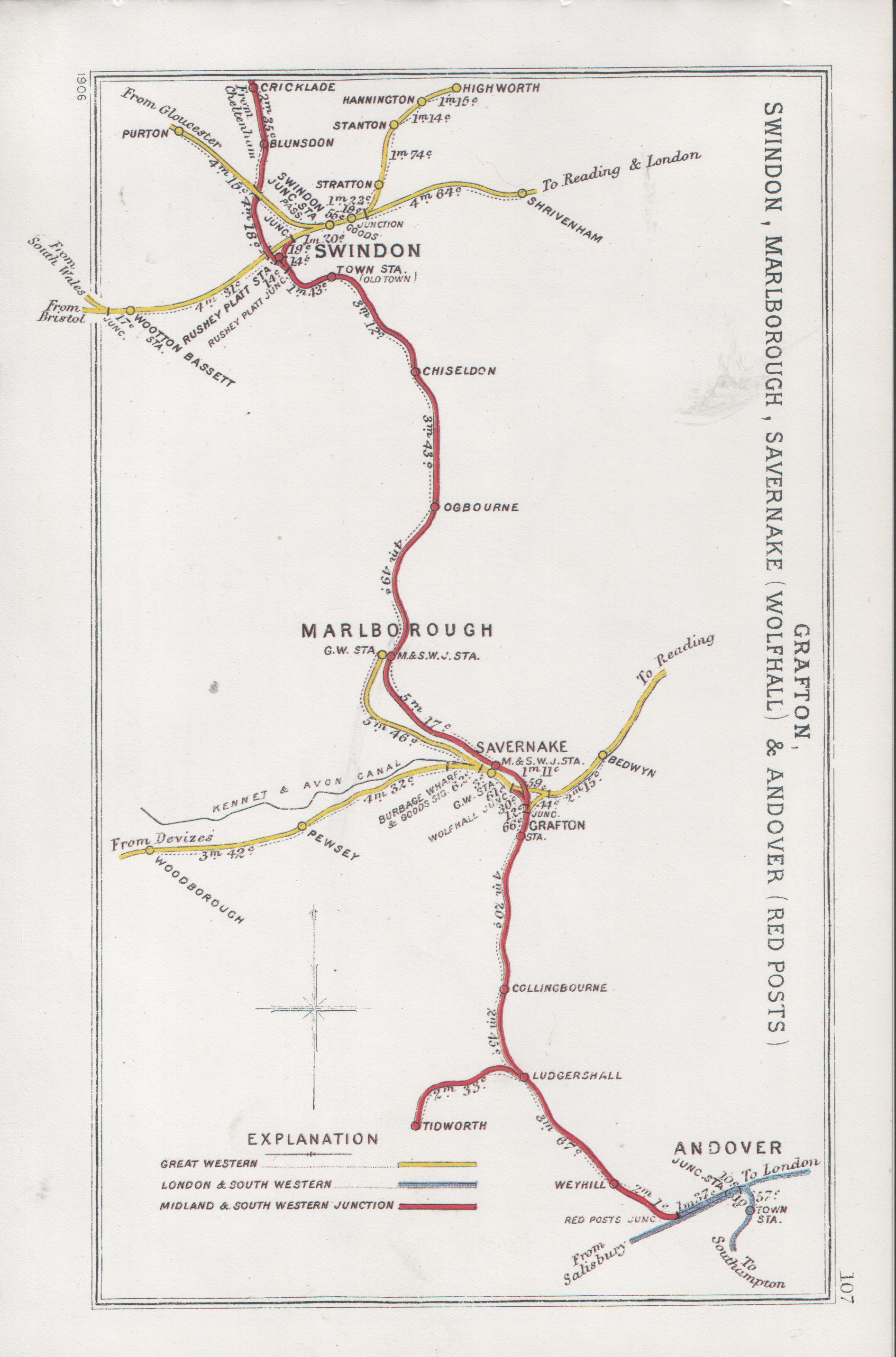
A 1906 Railway Clearing House map of railways in the vicinity of Shrivenham

Preceding station	Historical railways	Following station
Uffington; Line open, station closed	British Rail; Western Region; Great Western Main Line	Stratton Park Halt; Line open, station closed
