= Kempsford =

Village in Gloucestershire, England

Coordinates: 51.669°N 1.770°W

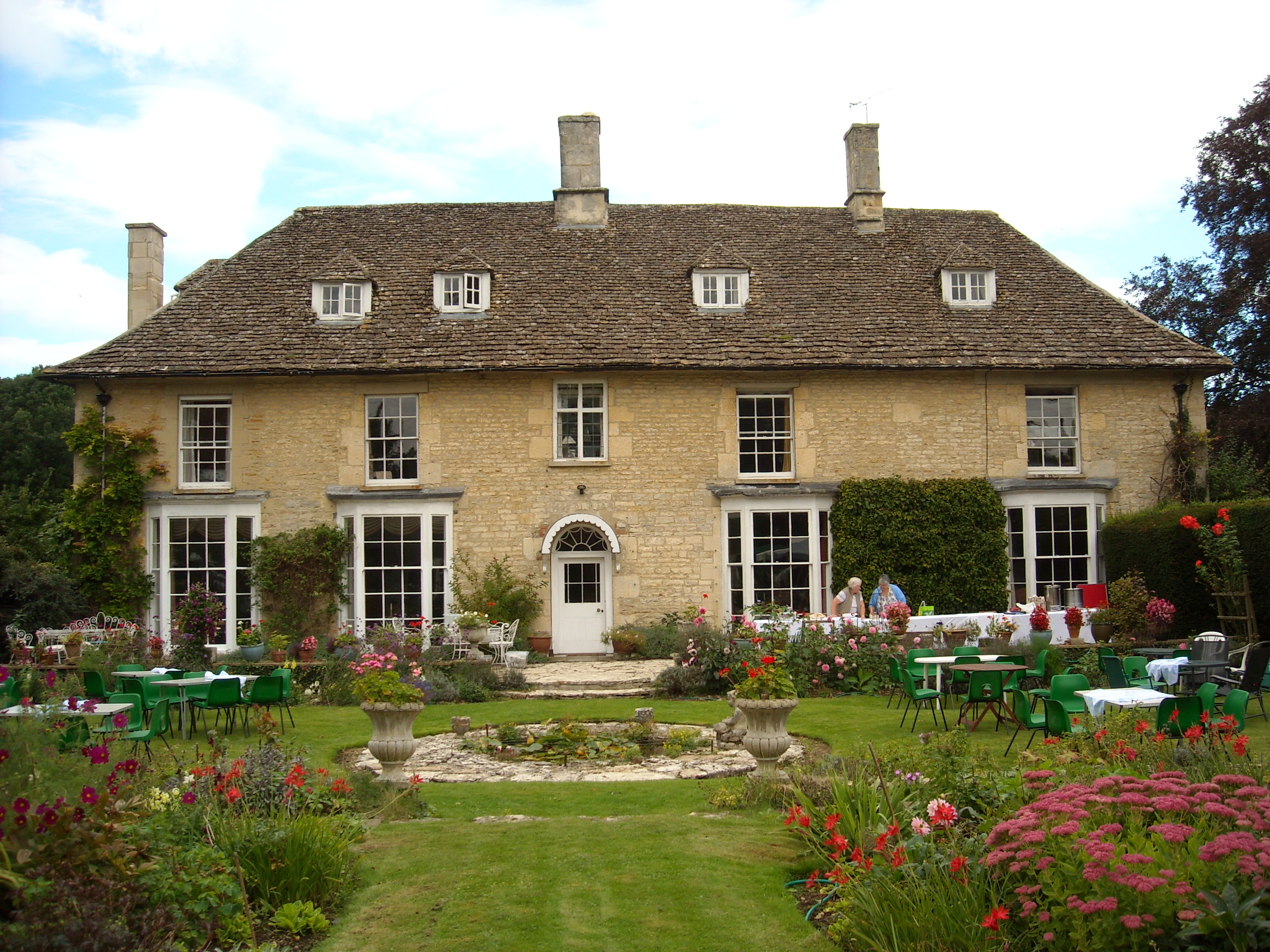
- Kempsford Manor

- Location within Gloucestershire
- Population: 1,123 (2011 census)
- OS grid reference: SU159967
- District: Cotswold
- Shire county: Gloucestershire
- Region: South West
- Country: England
- Sovereign state: United Kingdom
- Post town: FAIRFORD
- Postcode district: GL7
- Dialling code: 01285
- Police: Gloucestershire
- Fire: Gloucestershire
- Ambulance: South Western
- UK Parliament: South Cotswolds
- Website: Parish Council

Kempsford is a village and civil parish in Gloucestershire, England, about 2.5 miles (4 km) south of Fairford. RAF Fairford is immediately north of the village. The parish, which includes the hamlets of Whelford, Horcott, and Dunfield, had a population around 1,120 at the 2011 census.

== History ==
The village was known as Kynemereforde, which translates as the Ford of the Great Marsh.

The Battle of Kempsford occurred on 16 January 802 AD when Æthelmund led a group of Hwiccians from Mercia in a raid against the Wiltsaetas people of Wessex. However Weoxtan led the Wiltsaetas against them, driving them back across the river. Both leaders were slain. There is a field on the banks of the Thames called Battlefield where spearheads were dug up in 1670, encouraging the view that this is where the battle took place.

Sir Thomas Thynne (died 1639) built a new country house at Kempsford, demolishing an important fortified house which in the Middle Ages had defended a crossing of the River Thames.

A wharf on the Thames and Severn Canal was built in the 1780s, from which the Wharf House still exists.

The Hannington Bridge over the River Thames was built in 1841. Much of the canal in the parish has been filled in but restoration is being planned.

=== Airfield ===
In 1944 RAF Fairford was built, to serve as an airfield for British and American troop carriers and gliders for the D-Day invasion of Normandy during World War II. The RAF used it to lift British troops for Operation Market Garden during World War II, with part of the site falling within the parish. Its most prominent use in recent years has been as an airfield for United States Air Force B-52s during the 2003 Iraq War, Operation Allied Force in 1999, and the first Gulf War in 1991. It is the US Air Force's only European airfield for heavy bombers. RAF Fairford was the only TransOceanic Abort Landing site for NASA's Space Shuttle in the UK. As well as having a sufficiently long runway for a shuttle landing (the runway is 3,046 m (9,993 ft) long), it also had NASA-trained fire and medical crews stationed on the airfield. RAF Fairford has been the home of the Royal International Air Tattoo (RIAT), an annual air display, since 1985.

== Geography ==
The Thames and River Coln have deposited alluvial soil on the underlying Oxford Clay. Some of the land was drained with drains being dug possibly starting in the 12th century.

Whelford Meadow is a 1.86-hectare (4.6-acre) biological Site of Special Scientific Interest. The site lies on the gravels of the Upper Thames basin. It is of significant importance as it contains two nationally rare plants as well as uncommon plants. It is grassland (as its name implies). Whelford Pools (part of the Cotswold Water Park SSSI) are nearby. These are owned and managed by the Gloucestershire Wildlife Trust as a nature reserve. The meadow is dominated by species such as meadowsweet and common couch. A number of different species of sedge have been record and these include the nationally rare downey-fruited sedge (Carex tomentosa). Orchids present include southern marsh orchid. Adder's tongue flourishes on this site. The meadow supports fritillary which is nationally rare. The margins of the meadow are scrubland and this area provides cover for breeding birds such as warblers.

== Religious sites ==
The Anglican Church of St Mary the Virgin was built in the 12th century. The chancel was added in the 13th century with further alterations in subsequent centuries. A Victorian restoration was carried out by George Edmund Street around 1858. It is a Grade I listed building. The church has an eight-bay nave, chancel with wagon roof and three-stage tower supported by diagonal buttresses.

Many of the monuments in the churchyard are also listed.
