= Francis Popham (cricketer) =

English barrister and cricketer

Francis Leyborne Popham (14 October 1809 – 30 July 1880) was an English barrister and cricketer. He was associated with Oxford University Cricket Club and made his debut in 1829.

Popham was a member of the Popham family which at that time owned Littlecote House near Ramsbury. He was educated at Harrow School and University College, Oxford, matriculating in 1827. He graduated in 1831 and was a fellow of All Souls College, Oxford, 1831–43. He studied law at Lincoln's Inn and was called to the bar in 1837.

Popham bred and owned the racehorse Wild Dayrell, winner of the 1855 Derby.

== Bibliography ==
- Haygarth, Arthur (1996) [1862]. Scores & Biographies, Volume 1 (1744–1826). Kennington: Frederick Lillywhite. ISBN 978-19-00592-23-9.
- Haygarth, Arthur (1997) [1862]. Scores & Biographies, Volume 2 (1827–1840). Kennington: Frederick Lillywhite. ISBN 978-19-00592-23-9.
