= Swindon railway station =

Railway station in Wiltshire, England

Swindon
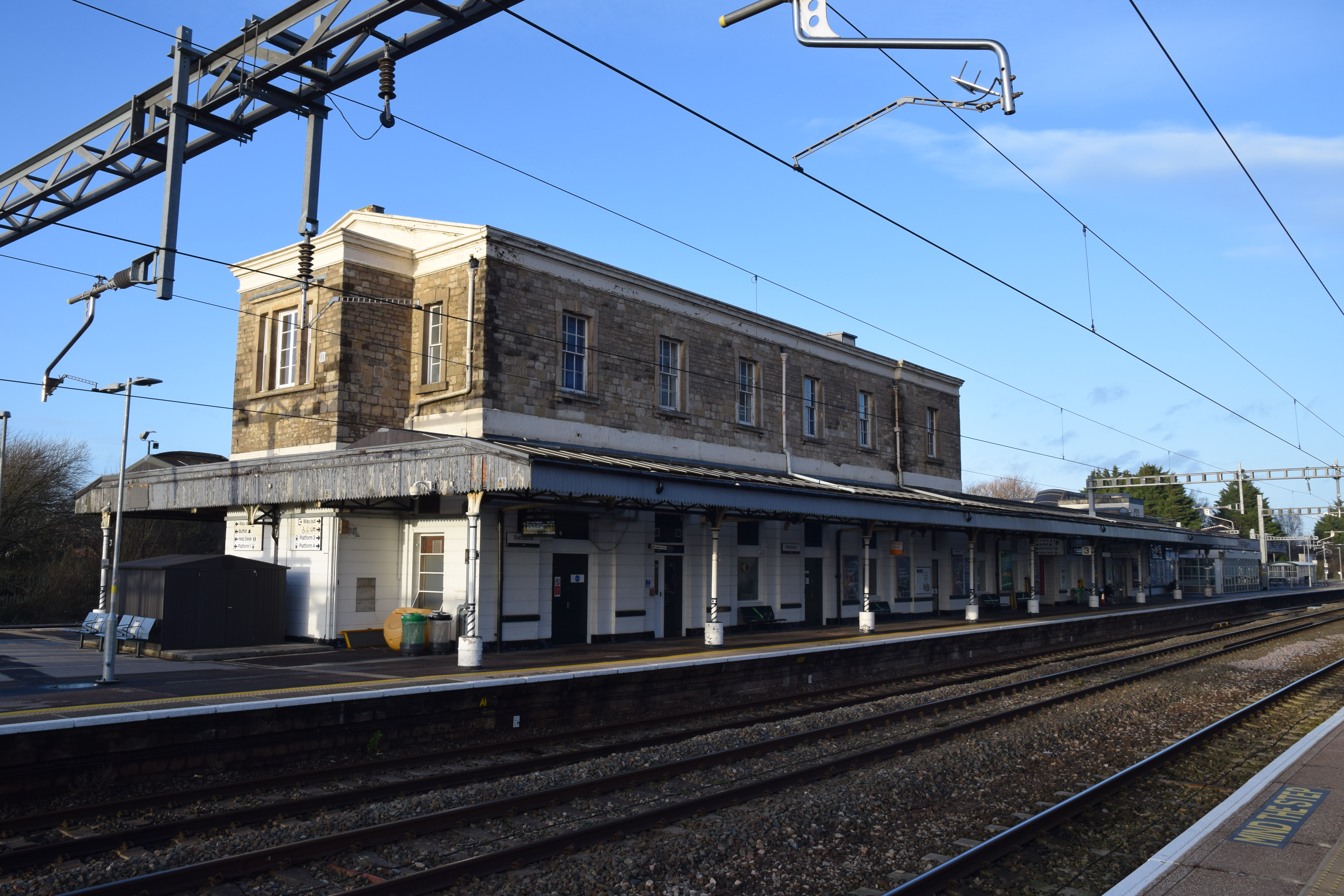
- The station in 2022, following electrification

General information
- Location: Swindon, Borough of Swindon, England
- Coordinates: 51.5656°N 1.7854°W
- Grid reference: SU149851
- Manager: Great Western Railway
- Platforms: 4
- Tracks: 6

Other information
- Station code: SWI
- Classification: DfT category C1

History
- Original company: Great Western Railway
- Pre-grouping: GWR
- Post-grouping: GWR

Key dates
- 1842: Opened as Swindon Junction
- 1961: Renamed Swindon

Passengers
- 2020/21: ▼0.652 million
- Interchange: ▼27,163
- 2021/22: ▲2.048 million
- Interchange: ▲0.103 million
- 2022/23: ▲2.588 million
- Interchange: ▲0.189 million
- 2023/24: ▲2.831 million
- Interchange: ▲0.218 million
- 2024/25: ▲3.151 million
- Interchange: ▲0.234 million
- 2025/26: ▲3.242 million
- Interchange: ▲0.287 million
Location
Notes
- Passenger statistics from the Office of Rail and Road

Swindon railway station is on the Great Western Main Line in South West England, serving the town of Swindon, in Wiltshire. The station is 77 miles 23 chains (77.3 mi; 124.4 km) down the line from London Paddington, and lies between Didcot Parkway and Chippenham. It is managed by Great Western Railway, which also operates all services from the station. It is the busiest station in Wiltshire and the third busiest station in South West England.

Being roughly halfway between the English and Welsh capitals of London and Cardiff, it is an important junction where the former Great Western Railway line to Gloucester and Cheltenham Spa, the main line to Bristol Temple Meads, and the South Wales Main Line via Bristol Parkway diverge.

The station is sited approximately 220 yards (200 metres) from the central bus station and the town centre. It is served by GWR services from Paddington to Bristol Temple Meads; Cheltenham Spa via Gloucester; Cardiff Central, Swansea and the rest of South Wales; and to Westbury.

== History ==
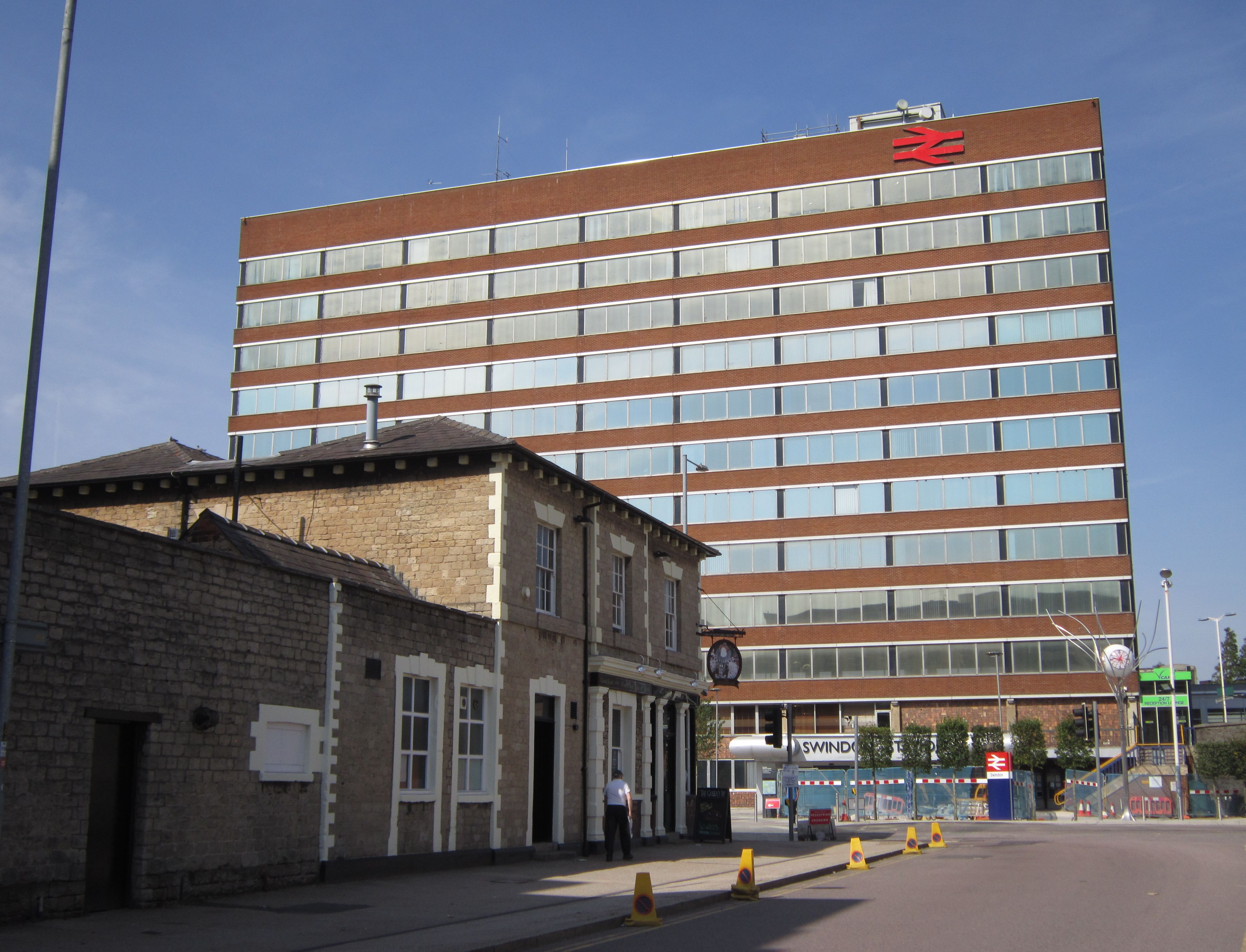
The National Rail logo above the station can be seen from a distance and helps travellers locate it

The main line of the Great Western Railway (GWR) was built and opened in stages. Construction began in late 1835 and, by the end of August 1840, the line was open between London Paddington and Faringdon Road (later known as Challow), also between Bristol Temple Meads and Bath. The section from Faringdon Road to a temporary terminus at Hay Lane (near Wootton Bassett) was opened on 17 December 1840; this passed to the north of the market town of Swindon (now known as Old Town); but the only intermediate station opened at that time was at Shrivenham.

Meanwhile, in 1836, the Cheltenham and Great Western Union Railway had been authorised to link the GWR with Gloucester and Cheltenham, and for this line, a junction at Swindon had been decided upon. The GWR line was planned by Isambard Kingdom Brunel to rise from both London and Bristol to a summit near Swindon, and to have easy gradients east of that summit, and steeper gradients to the west. In October 1840, Brunel and his colleague Daniel Gooch decided that one locomotive would not be able to manage the whole distance without taking on fuel; it would therefore be necessary to change locomotives part-way. Reading was chosen as one place to change engines, being both a major station and, at just under 36 miles (58 kilometres), approximately one-third of the 118 mi (190 km) distance from Paddington to Bristol. They also felt that it would be convenient to change locomotives at Swindon; not only was this almost two-thirds of the way, just over 77 mi or 124 km and the site of the junction for the Cheltenham line, it was also the summit of the line; a train from London could have its fast locomotive replaced by a slower but more powerful locomotive for the journey on to Bristol. Accordingly, it was necessary to provide locomotive maintenance facilities at Swindon.

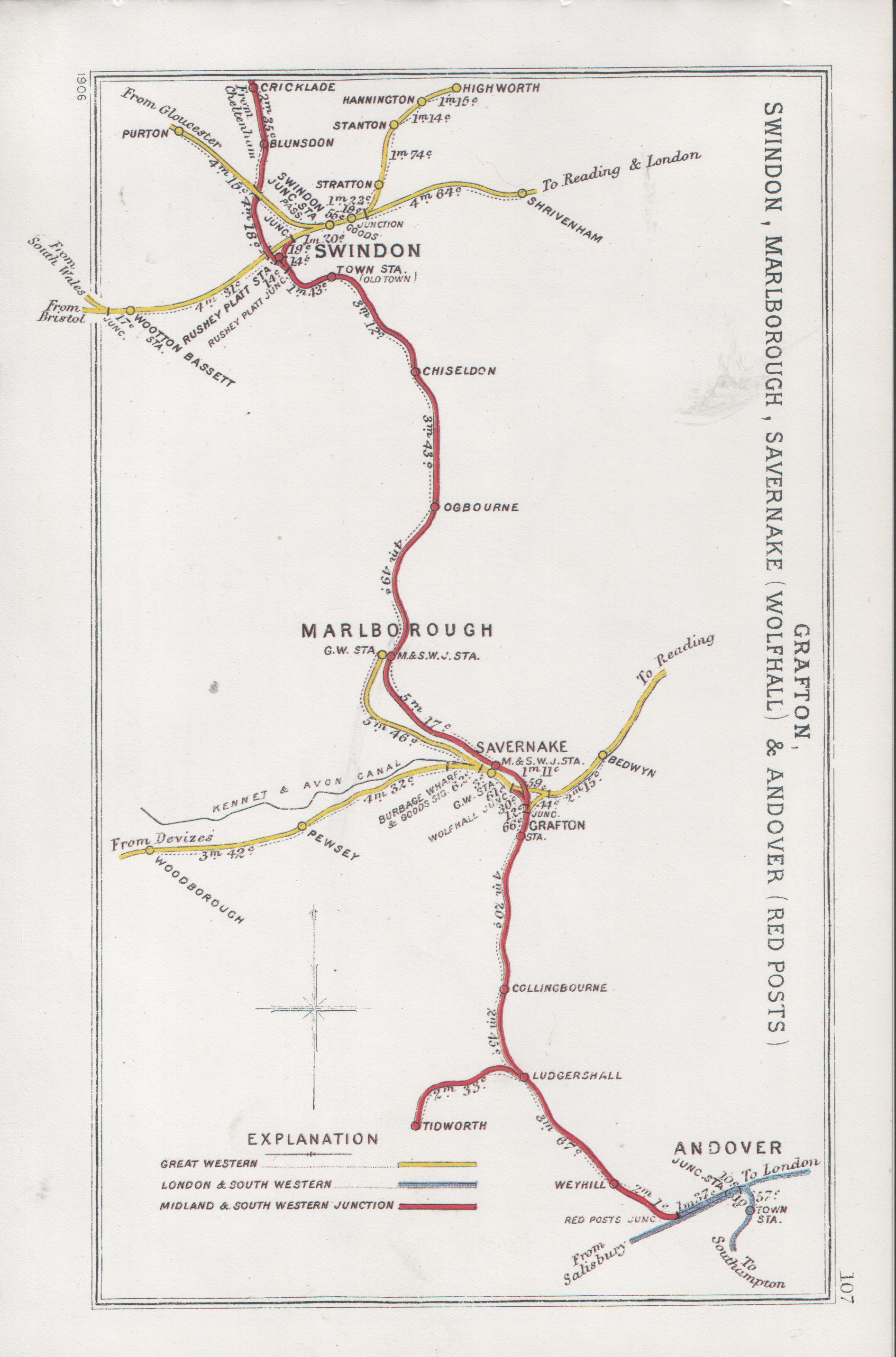
A 1906 Railway Clearing House map of railways in the vicinity of Swindon

The proximity of the North Wilts Canal was also a factor, since it would enable coke for the locomotives and coal for the workshops to be supplied from the Somerset Coalfield at a reasonable price. A station was then planned around the junction, and opened at the same time as the first portion of the Cheltenham line (from Swindon to Kemble and Cirencester); the GWR main line was extended from Hay Lane to Chippenham on the same day, 31 May 1841. The GWR had engaged the Westminster firm of Messrs. J. & C. Rigby to build several stations, including all those between Steventon and Corsham; this firm was also given the construction contracts for all of the buildings at Swindon, including the station and its refreshment rooms, the locomotive repair shops, 300 houses and other buildings needed for the workers. The GWR was short of money and, in late 1841, the contractors, instead of asking for payment, agreed to give Swindon station and its refreshment rooms to the GWR free of charge, and to lease back the refreshment rooms for 99 years at one (old) penny per year.

Part of the deal was that:

All trains carrying passengers, not being Goods trains or trains to be sent express or for special purposes, and except trains not under the control of the Great Western Railway Company, which shall pass the Swindon Station either up or down, shall, save in case of emergency or unusual delay arising from accidents, stop there for refreshment of passengers for a reasonable period of about ten minutes.

In this "reasonable period", not only could the passengers be refreshed but the locomotive would also be changed. Messrs. Rigby would then be able to use the profits from the refreshment rooms to recover their financial outlay. Not long after the contract was finalised, Rigby then sublet the rights to S. Y. Griffiths of Cheltenham for seven years, for which Griffiths paid Rigby £6,000 up front and then £1,100 per year. (Note: About £538,000 and £99,000 today) Before this expired, Rigby sold the lease to J. R. Phillips for £20,000 in August 1848. (Note: About £2,058,000 today)

With the railway passing through the town in early 1841, the Goddard Arms public house in Old Swindon was used as a railway booking office in lieu of a station. Tickets purchased included the fare for a horse-drawn carriage to the line at the bottom of the hill.

Swindon railway station opened in 1842 with construction of the GWR's engineering works continuing. Until 1895, every train stopped here for at least 10 minutes to change locomotives. The station housed the first recorded railway refreshment rooms, divided according to class. Swindonians, for a time, were eminently proud that even the current King and Queen of the time had partaken of refreshments there. The station was built of three storeys, with the refreshment rooms on the ground floor, the upper floors comprising the station hotel and lounge. Until 1961, when Swindon Town station closed, the station was known as Swindon Junction.

=== 20th century ===
The railway in the vicinity of Swindon station, and for a distance of about 20–30 miles (30–50 kilometres) in each direction towards Didcot, Bristol, South Wales and Gloucester, was controlled from a signal box situated behind platform 4. The panel box is a Western Region Integra design built by Henry Williams (Darlington) and opened in March 1968. The box was decommissioned in February 2016 and the panel was moved for preservation to Didcot Railway Centre.

The original building was demolished in 1972, with today's modern station and office block erected on the site.

The Travel Centre (booking office) at Swindon was APTIS-equipped by the end of October 1986, making it one of the first stations with the ticketing system which was eventually found across the UK at all staffed British Rail stations by the end of the 1980s.

=== 21st century ===
On 2 June 2003, platform 4 opened. Prior to this all westbound trains had used platform 3 and eastbound services platform 1. Services terminating or starting here on the lines to Westbury via Chippenham and Gloucester use platform 2, a west-facing inset bay.

In August 2014, Network Rail completed the redoubling of the track between Swindon and Kemble in order to improve services between London and Cheltenham/Gloucester, and to allow for maintenance work in the Severn Tunnel by diverting Swansea services via Gloucester. When originally laid in 1842 the line was double-track throughout, but some 12 1/4 miles (19.5 kilometres) of the second track were removed in 1968/69.

An electrification programme for the Great Western Main Line was proposed in 2009 but encountered delays; services powered from 25kV AC overhead lines began to run through Swindon, towards Paddington and Bristol Parkway, at the end of 2018. The lines to Cheltenham/Gloucester and to Chippenham are not electrified.

=== Stationmasters ===
- Christopher Hill 1841 – 1852 (later station master at Chippenham)
- George Wasborough Andrewes 1852 - 1855 (formerly station master at Chippenham, afterwards station master at Birmingham)
- John Holmes 1859 - 1873 (formerly station master at Cirencester)
- Mr. Reynolds 1873 – 1877
- William Bonner 1877 – 1897 (formerly station master at Wrexham)
- John Brewer 1897 – 1909 (formerly station master at Truro)
- F.S. Davies from 1909 (formerly station master at Weymouth)
- H.G. Cotterall 1915 – 1919 (formerly station master at Weymouth)
- W. Thick 1919 – 1922 (formerly station master at Milford Haven)
- S.N Cooper 1922 – 1930 (formerly station master at Pontypool)
- Arthur Meddows Taylor 1930 – 1933 (brother of later station master Sidney, formerly station master at Didcot)
- W.J. Pepler 1933 – 1935
- Sidney Meddows Taylor 1935 – 1942 (brother of former station master Arthur, formerly station master at Bath)
- G. Naylor 1942 – 1951 (formerly station master at Plymouth)
- Ernest Sharples 1951 – 1955 (later station master at Manchester London Road)

== Services ==
All services at Swindon are operated by Great Western Railway. The station is served by frequent inter-city trains to London Paddington eastbound, and westbound to Bristol Temple Meads and Cardiff Central along the Great Western Main Line. There are services to Cheltenham Spa via Gloucester on the Golden Valley line, and a local service to Westbury via the Wessex Main Line.

The typical off-peak service in trains per hour (tph) is:

- 5 tph to London Paddington
- 2 tph to Bristol Temple Meads
- 2 tph to Cardiff Central; of which:
  - 1 tph continues to Swansea
- 1 tph to Cheltenham Spa, via Gloucester
- 1 tp2h to Westbury, via Melksham.

Additional services run during peak periods and some existing services are extended further afield. Some trains are extended beyond Swansea to Carmarthen and a number of trains are extended beyond Bristol Temple Meads to Weston-super-Mare, Taunton, Exeter St Davids, Plymouth and Penzance.

Preceding station	National Rail	Following station
Didcot Parkway	Great Western Railway South Wales Main Line	Bristol Parkway
Didcot Parkway	Great Western Railway Golden Valley Line	Kemble
Didcot Parkway	Great Western Railway Great Western Main Line	Chippenham
Terminus	Great Western Railway Wessex Main Line	Chippenham
Historical railways
Purton Line open, station closed	Great Western Railway Cheltenham and Great Western Union Railway	Terminus
Stratton Park Halt Line open, station closed	Great Western Railway Great Western Main Line	Wootton Bassett Junction Line open, station closed
Disused railways
Stratton Line and station closed	Great Western Railway Highworth Branch Line	Terminus

=== Future services ===
Go-op, a co-operatively owned open access train operating company, has proposed to operate services between Swindon, Taunton and Weston-super-Mare. In November 2024, the Office of Rail and Road gave conditional approval for the proposed services, subject to financial and rolling stock requirements, to begin no later than December 2026.
