= List of closed railway stations in Great Britain: S =

The list of closed railway stations in Great Britain includes the following: Year of closure is given if known. Stations reopened as heritage railways continue to be included in this list and some have been linked. Some stations have been reopened to passenger traffic. Some lines remain in use for freight and mineral traffic.

== St. (prefix) ==
=== St A ===
Station (Town, unless in station name)	Rail company	Year closed
St Agnes	GWR	1963
St Albans (London Road)	Hatfield and St. Albans Railway	1951
St Andrew Street (Castle Douglas)	Glasgow and South Western Railway	1867
St Andrews	North British Railway	1969
St Andrews Links (also known as St. Andrews old station)	North British Railway	1887
St Anne's Park (Bristol)	Great Western Railway	1970
St Ann's Road	Tottenham & Hampstead Junction Railway	1942
St Ann's Well	GNR	1916
St Anthonys (Newcastle-upon-Tyne)	NER	1960
St Asaph	L&NWR	1955
St. Athan	GWR	1964
St Athan Road	Taff Vale Railway	1930

=== St B ===
Station (Town, unless in station name)	Rail company	Year closed
St Bees Golf Club Halt	Furness Railway	1918
St Blazey	GWR	1925
St Boswells	North British Railway	1969
St Briavels	GWR	1959

=== St C ===
Station (Town, unless in station name)	Rail company	Year closed
St Clears	GWR	1964
St Combs	Great North of Scotland Railway	1965
St Cyrus	North British Railway	1951

=== St D ===
Station (Town, unless in station name)	Rail company	Year closed
St Devereux	GWR	1958
St Dunstans	GNR	1952

=== St E ===
Station (Town, unless in station name)	Rail company	Year closed
St Enoch, Glasgow	Glasgow and South Western Railway	1966

=== St F ===
Station (Town, unless in station name)	Rail company	Year closed
St Fagans	GWR	1962
St Fillans	Caledonian Railway	1951
St Fort	North British Railway	1965

=== St G ===
Station (Town, unless in station name)	Rail company	Year closed
St Germain's (Norfolk)	East Anglian Railways	1850
St. Germain's (Isle of Man)	Manx Northern Railway	1961

=== St H ===
Station (Town, unless in station name)	Rail company	Year closed
St Harmons	Cambrian Railways	1962
St Helens (Isle of Wight)	Isle of Wight Railway	1953
St Helens (Swansea)	Swansea and Mumbles Railway	1960
St Helens Central (GCR)	Great Central Railway	1952
St Hilary Platform	Taff Vale Railway	1920

=== St I ===
Station (Town, unless in station name)	Rail company	Year closed
St Ives (Cambridgeshire)	Great Northern and Great Eastern Joint Railway	1970

=== St J ===
Station (Town, unless in station name)	Rail company	Year closed
St James (Cheltenham)	GWR	1966
St James Deeping	GNR	1961
St John's (Isle of Man)	Isle of Man Railway	1968
St John's Chapel	NER	1953
St Johns Street (Northampton)	Midland Railway	1939

=== St K ===
Station (Town, unless in station name)	Rail company	Year closed
St Kew Highway	L&SWR	1966

=== St L ===
Station (Town, unless in station name)	Rail company	Year closed
St Lawrence (Isle of Wight)	Isle of Wight Central Railway	1952
St Lawrence for Pegwell Bay	South Eastern Railway (UK)	1916
St Lawrence Platform	GWR	1917
St Leonards (Edinburgh)	North British Railway	1860
St Leonards, West Marina	LB&SCR	1967
St Luke's (Southport)	Lancashire and Yorkshire Railway	1968

=== St M ===
Station (Town, unless in station name)	Rail company	Year closed
St Mary Church Road	Taff Vale Railway	1930
St. Mary's (Cambridgeshire)	GNR	1947
St Mary's Crossing Halt	GWR	1964
St Mary's Halt	Dean Forest Railway	2014
St Mary's (Whitechapel Road)	Metropolitan Railway/District Railway	1938
St. Melyd Golf Links	LM&SR	1930
St. Monance	North British Railway	1965

=== St O ===
Station (Town, unless in station name)	Rail company	Year closed
St Olaves	Great Eastern Railway	1959

=== St P ===
Station (Town, unless in station name)	Rail company	Year closed
St Paul's (Halifax)	Halifax High Level Railway	1917
St Peter's (Newcastle)	NER	1973
St Philips (Bristol)	Midland Railway	1953

=== St Q ===
Station (Town, unless in station name)	Rail company	Year closed
St Quintin Park and Wormwood Scrubs	West London Railway	1940

=== St R ===
Station (Town, unless in station name)	Rail company	Year closed
St Rollox (Glasgow)	Caledonian Railway	1962

=== St T ===
Station (Town, unless in station name)	Rail company	Year closed
St Thomas (Swansea)	Midland Railway	1950
St Thomas Cross Platform	LM&SR	1952

=== St W ===
Station (Town, unless in station name)	Rail company	Year closed
St Winefride's Halt	L&NWR	1954

=== St Y ===
Station (Town, unless in station name)	Rail company	Year closed
St-y-Nyll Platform	Barry Railway Company	1905

== S ==
=== Sa ===
Station (Town, unless in station name)	Rail company	Year closed
Saddleworth	L&NWR	1968
Saffron Walden	Great Eastern Railway	1964
Salcey Forest	East and West Junction Railway	1893
Salehurst Halt	Kent and East Sussex Light Railway	1954
Salem Halt	Welsh Highland Railway	1936
Salford Priors	Midland Railway	1962
Salisbury	Great Western Railway	1932
Salisbury (Milford)	LSWR	1859
Salt and Sandon	GNR	1939
Saltcoats North	Lanarkshire and Ayrshire Railway	1932
Salter Lane	Ashover Light Railway	1936
Saltfleetby	GNR	1960
Saltford	GWR	1970
Salthouse Halt	Furness Railway	1921
Saltley	Midland Railway	1968
Saltney	GWR	1960
Saltney Ferry	L&NWR	1962
Saltoun	North British Railway	1933
Salvation Army Halt	GNR	1951
Salzcraggie Platform	Highland Railway	1965
Sampford Courtenay	London and South Western Railway	1972
Sampford Peverell	GWR	1964
Sand Hutton Central	Sand Hutton Light Railway	1930
Sand Hutton Depot	Sand Hutton Light Railway	1930
Sand Hutton Gardens	Sand Hutton Light Railway	1930
Sandal	West Riding and Grimsby Joint Railway	1957 reopened 1987
Sandal and Walton (latterly Walton)	Midland Railway	1961
Sandall	South Yorkshire Railway	1859
Sandford and Banwell	GWR	1963
Sandgate	South Eastern Railway (UK)	1931
Sandholme	Hull and Barnsley Railway	1955
Sandilands	Caledonian Railway	1964
Sandon	North Staffordshire Railway	1947
Sandon Dock	Liverpool Overhead Railway	1896
Sandsend	NER	1958
Sandsfoot Castle Halt	Weymouth and Portland Railway	1952
Sandside	Furness Railway	1942
Sandwich Road	East Kent Light Railway	1928
Sandycroft	L&NWR	1961
Sandyford Halt	Glasgow & South Western Railway	1967
Sankey Bridges	L&NWR	1949
Sanquhar	Glasgow and South Western Railway	1965 reopened 1994
Sarnau	GWR	1964
Sarsden Halt	GWR	1962
Sauchie	North British Railway	1930
Saughall	GCR	1954
Saughton	North British Railway	1921
Saughtree	North British Railway	1956
Savernake High Level	Midland and South Western Junction Railway	1958
Savernake Low Level	GWR	1966
Sawdon	NER	1950
Sawley (For Sawley Junction see Long Eaton)	Midland Railway	1930
Saxby	Midland Railway	1892; 1961
Saxham and Risby	Great Eastern Railway	1967

=== Sc ===
Station (Town, unless in station name)	Rail company	Year closed
Scafell Halt	Cambrian Railways	1955
Scalby	NER	1953
Scale Hall	British Railways	1966
Scalford	Great Northern and London and North Western Joint Railway	1953
Scarborough Londesborough Road (also known as "Londesborough Road")	NER	1966
Scarcliffe	LD&ECR	1951
Scarning	East Anglian Railways	1850
Scawby and Hibaldstow	Great Central Railway	1968
Scholes	NER	1964
Schoolhill	Great North of Scotland Railway	1937
Scopwick and Timberland	Great Northern and Great Eastern Joint Railway	1955
Scorrier	GWR	1964
Scorton (Lancashire)	Lancaster and Preston Junction Railway	1840; 1939
Scorton (North Yorkshire)	NER	1969
Scotby	Midland Railway	1942
Scotby	NER	1959
Scotch Dyke	North British Railway	1949
Scotland Street (Edinburgh)	North British Railway	1868
Scotsgap	North British Railway	1952
Scotstoun East	Caledonian Railway	1964
Scotstoun West	Caledonian Railway	1964
Scotswood	NER	1967
Scotswood Works Halt	North Eastern Railway	1944
Scratby Halt	Midland and Great Northern Joint Railway	1959
Scremerston	NER	1951
Scrooby	GNR	1931
Scropton	North Staffordshire Railway	1866
Scruton	NER	1954 reopened 2014
Sculcoates	NER	1912
Scunthorpe (Dawes Lane)	North Lindsey Light Railway	1925

=== Se ===
Station (Town, unless in station name)	Rail company	Year closed
Seacombe and Egremont	Wirral Railway	1960
Seacroft	GNR	1953
Seaforth Sands	Liverpool Overhead Railway	1956
Seaham Harbour	NER	1939
Seahouses	North Sunderland Railway	1951
Sealand	GCR	1968
Sealand Rifle Range Halt	LNER	1954
Seaton (Cumbria)	Cleator and Workington Junction Railway	1922
Seaton (Devon)	London & South Western Railway	1966
Seaton (Durham)	NER	1952
Seaton (Rutland)	L&NWR	1966
Seaton Delaval	NER	1964 Reopened 2024
Seaton Junction	London and South Western Railway	1966
Seaton Sluice	Blyth and Tyne Railway	1853
Sebastopol	GWR	1962
Sedbergh	L&NWR	1954
Sedgebrook	GNR	1956
Sedgefield	NER	1952
Sedgeford	GER	1952
Seedley	L&NWR	1956
Seend	GWR	1966
Sefton and Maghull	Cheshire Lines Committee	1952
Sefton Park	L&NWR	1960
Seghill	NER	1964
Selby (Brayton Gates)	North Eastern Railway	1904
Selham	London, Brighton and South Coast Railway	1955
Selkirk	North British Railway	1951
Selsdon	Woodside and South Croydon Railway	1983
Selsey Beach	West Sussex Railway	1904
Selsey Bridge	West Sussex Railway	1935
Selsey Town	West Sussex Railway	1935
Semington Halt	GWR	1966
Semley	London and South Western Railway	1966
Senghenydd	Rhymney Railway	1964
Serridge Platform	Severn and Wye Railway	1879
Sessay	NER	1958
Sesswick Halt	Cambrian Railways	1962
Seton Mains Halt	North British Railway	1930
Settle Junction	Midland Railway	1877
Settrington	NER	1950
Seven Hills Halt	Great Eastern Railway	1953
Seven Sisters (West Glamorgan)	Neath and Brecon Railway	1962
Seven Stars Halt (Welshpool)	Cambrian Railways	1931
Seven Stones	Plymouth, Devonport and South Western Junction Railway	1917
Severn Bridge	Severn and Wye Railway	1964
Sexhow	NER	1954

=== Sh ===
Station (Town, unless in station name)	Rail company	Year closed
Shackerstone	Ashby and Nuneaton Joint Railway	1931 now reopened
Shadwell and St Georges East	London & Blackwall Railway	1941
Shakespeare Cliff Halt	SE&CR	1994
Shandon	West Highland Railway	1964
Shankend	North British Railway	1969
Shap	L&NWR	1968
Shap Summit	LMS	1958
Shapwick	Somerset and Dorset Joint Railway	1966
Sharlston	Lancashire and Yorkshire Railway	1958
Sharnal Street	South Eastern Railway (UK)	1961
Sharnbrook	Midland Railway	1960
Sharpness	Severn and Wye Railway	1879; 1964
Shaugh Bridge Platform	GWR	1962
Shaw and Crompton	Lancashire and Yorkshire Railway	2009
Shaw Syke	Lancashire and Yorkshire Railway	1850
Shawclough and Healey	Lancashire and Yorkshire Railway	1947
Shawforth	Lancashire and Yorkshire Railway	1947
Sheepbridge	Midland Railway	1967
Sheepbridge and Brimington – later named Brimington	Great Central Railway	1956
Sheerness Dockyard	London, Chatham and Dover Railway	1922
Sheerness East	Sheppey Light Railway	1950
Sheffield Bridgehouses	Sheffield, Ashton-under-Lyne and Manchester Railway	1851
Sheffield Park	LB&SCR	1958 reopened 1960 by Bluebell Rly.
Sheffield Victoria	Manchester, Sheffield and Lincolnshire Railway	1970
Sheffield Wicker	Sheffield and Rotherham Railway	1870
Shefford	Midland Railway	1962
Shenton	Ashby and Nuneaton Joint Railway	1931 now reopened
Shepherds	GWR	1963
Shepherd's Bush	London and South Western Railway	1916
Shepherd's Bush (Uxbridge Road)	West London Railway	1844
Shepherdswell (EKLR)	East Kent Light Railway	1948 reopened 1993
Shepshed	LNWR	1931
Shepton Mallet (Charlton Road)	Somerset and Dorset Joint Railway	1966
Shepton Mallet (High Street)	East Somerset Railway	1963
Sherburn Colliery	NER	1941
Sherburn House	NER	1893; 1931
Sherburn-in-Elmet	NER	1965 reopened in 1984
Sheriffhall	North British Railway	c. 1847
Shern Hall Street (Walthamstow)	Great Eastern Railway	1873
Sherwood	GNR	1916
Shide (Isle of Wight)	Isle of Wight Central Railway	1956
Shieldhill	Caledonian Railway	1952
Shields	Glasgow and South Western Railway	Amalgamated into Shields Road 1925, closed 1966
Shields Road (Glasgow)	City of Glasgow Union Railway	1966
Shillingstone	Somerset and Dorset Railway	1966
Shilton	LNWR	1957
Shincliffe	NER	1941
Shincliffe Town	North Eastern Railway	1893
Shipley and Windhill	GNR	1931
Shipley Gate	Midland Railway	1948
Shipston-on-Stour	GWR	1929
Shipton-on-Cherwell Halt	GWR	1954
Shirdley Hill	Lancashire and Yorkshire Railway	1938
Shirebrook North	LD&ECR	1955
Shirebrook South	GNR	1931
Shirebrook West	Midland Railway	1964 reopened 1998
Shirley Holms Halt	L&SWR	1888
Shoot Hill	Shropshire and Montgomeryshire Railway	1933
Shoreditch	North London Railway	1940
Shoreditch	East London Railway	2006
Shoreham Airport (Bungalow Town) Halt	London, Brighton and South Coast Railway	1940
Short Heath	Midland Railway	1931
Shoscombe and Single Hill Halt	Somerset and Dorset Railway	1966
Shotley Bridge	NER	1953
Shottle	Midland Railway	1947
Shotton Bridge (Durham)	NER	1952
Shrawardine	Potteries, Shrewsbury and North Wales Railway	1933
Shrewsbury Abbey	Shropshire and Montgomeryshire Railway	1933
Shrewsbury West	Shropshire and Montgomeryshire Railway	1933
Shrivenham	GWR	1964
Shustoke	Midland Railway	1968

=== Si ===
Station (Town, unless in station name)	Rail company	Year closed
Sible and Castle Hedingham	Colne Valley and Halstead Railway	1962
Sibleys	Great Eastern Railway	1952
Sibsey	GNR	1961
Sibson	GNR	1878
Siddick Junction	LNWR/Cleator and Workington Junction Railway	1934
Sidestrand Halt	Norfolk and Suffolk Joint Railway	1953
Sideway Halt	North Staffordshire Railway	1923
Sidlesham	West Sussex Railway	1935
Sidley	South Eastern and Chatham Railway	1964
Sidmouth	London and South Western Railway	1967
Sidmouth Junction	London and South Western Railway	1967 (reopened as Feniton, 1971)
Sigglesthorne	NER	1964
Sileby	Midland Railway	1968 reopened 1994
Silian Halt	Great Western Railway	1951
Silkstone	Manchester, Sheffield and Lincolnshire Railway	1959 reopened 1984
Silloth	North British Railway	1964
Silverdale (Crown Street) Halt	North Staffordshire Railway	1949
Silverdale (Staffordshire)	North Staffordshire Railway	1964
Silverton (Devon)	Bristol and Exeter Railway	1964
Silvertown	Great Eastern Railway	2006
Simonstone	Lancashire and Yorkshire Railway	1957
Sinclairtown (Kirkcaldy)	North British Railway	1969
Sinderby	NER	1962
Sinfin Central	British Railways	1998
Sinfin North	British Railways	1998
Singer Workers Platform	North British Railway	1967
Singleton (Lancashire)	Preston and Wyre Railway	1932
Singleton (West Sussex)	London, Brighton and South Coast Railway	1935
Sinnington	NER	1953
Sirhowy	London and North Western Railway	1960
Six Bells Halt	GWR	1962
Six Mile Bottom	Great Eastern Railway	1967

=== Sk ===
Station (Town, unless in station name)	Rail company	Year closed
Skares	Glasgow and South Western Railway	1951
Skegby	GNR	1931
Skelbo	Highland Railway	1960
Skellingthorpe	Great Northern and Great Eastern Joint Railway	1868
Skellingthorpe	LD&ECR	1955
Skelmanthorpe	Lancashire and Yorkshire Railway	1983
Skelmersdale	Lancashire and Yorkshire Railway	1956
Skewen	GWR	1964 reopened 1994
Skinningrove	NER	1952
Skipwith and North Duffield	Derwent Valley Light Railway	1926
Skirlaugh	NER	1957

=== Sl ===
Station (Town, unless in station name)	Rail company	Year closed
Slaggyford	NER	1976
Slaithwaite	LNWR	1968 reopened 1982
Slamannan	North British Railway	1930
Sledmere and Fimber	NER	1950
Sleightholme	Carlisle and Silloth Bay Railway	1857
Slinfold	London, Brighton and South Coast Railway	1965
Slingsby	NER	1931
Slochd Crossing	Highland Railway	c. 1935
Slough Trading Estate	Great Western Railway	1956

=== Sm ===
Station (Town, unless in station name)	Rail company	Year closed
Smallford	GNR	1951
Smardale	NER	1952
Smeafield	NER	1930
Smeaton	North British Railway	1930
Smeeth	South Eastern Railway (UK)	1954
Smeeth Road	Great Eastern Railway	1968
Smethwick West	GWR	1996
Smithy Bridge	Lancashire and Yorkshire Railway	1960 reopened 1985

=== Sn ===
Station (Town, unless in station name)	Rail company	Year closed
Snailham Halt	South Eastern and Chatham Railway	1959
Snainton	NER	1950
Snapper Halt	Lynton and Barnstaple Railway	1935
Snarestone	Ashby and Nuneaton Joint Railway	1931
Snatchwood Halt	GWR	1953
Snelland	Great Central Railway	1965
Snells Nook Halt	London and North Western Railway	1931
Snettisham	Great Eastern Railway	1969
Snow Hill (Birmingham)	GWR	1972 reopened 1987
Snow Hill (Holborn Viaduct)	London, Chatham and Dover Railway	1916
Snowdon Ranger Halt	Welsh Highland Railway	1936 reopened in 2003

=== So ===
Station (Town, unless in station name)	Rail company	Year closed
Soham	Great Eastern Railway	1965 reopened 2021
Soho	London and North Western Railway	1949
Soho and Winson Green	GWR	1972
Soho Road	London and North Western Railway	1941
Somerset Road	Midland Railway	1930
Somersham	Great Northern and Great Eastern Joint Railway	1967
Somerton	GWR	1962
Sorbie	Portpatrick and Wigtownshire Joint Railway	1950
Sourden	Great North of Scotland Railway	1866
South Acton	District Railway	1959
South Alloa	Scottish Central Railway	1885
South Aylesbury Halt	GWR/GCR Joint Railway	1967
South Bromley	North London Railway	1944
South Cave	Hull and Barnsley Railway	1955
South Cerney	Midland and South Western Junction Railway	1961
South Church	Stockton and Darlington Railway	1844
South Dock (London)	Great Eastern Railway	1926
South Harefield Halt	GWR/GCR Joint Railway	1931
South Hetton	NER	1952
South Howden	Hull and Barnsley Railway	1955
South Kentish Town	Charing Cross, Euston and Hampstead Railway	1924
South Lambeth	London, Brighton and South Coast Railway	1860
South Leigh	GWR	1962
South Leith	North British Railway	1903
South Lynn	Midland and Great Northern Joint Railway	1959
South Molton	GWR	1966
South Pit Halt-(Glyncorrwg)	Great Western Railway	1930
South Queensferry	North British Railway	1929
South Renfrew	Glasgow and South Western Railway	1967
South Shields	Brandling Junction Railway	1842
South Shields	NER	1981
South Shields	Pontop and South Shields Railway	1844
South Shore	Blackpool and Lytham Railway	1916
South Side, (Glasgow)	Glasgow, Barrhead and Neilston Direct Railway	1877
South Side (Glasgow)	Caledonian Railway	1879
South Street Halt	South Eastern and Chatham Railway	1931
South Willingham and Hainton	GNR	1951
South Witham	Midland Railway	1959
Southam and Long Itchington	London and North Western Railway	1958
Southam Road and Harbury	GWR	1964
Southampton Royal Pier	London and South Western Railway	1914
Southampton Terminus	London and South Western Railway	1966
Southampton West End	London & South Western Railway	1895
Southburn	NER	1954
South Church	Stockton and Darlington Railway	1845
Southcoates	NER	1964
Southend (Swansea)	Swansea and Mumbles Railway	1960
Southerndown Road	Barry Railway	1961
Southfleet	London, Chatham and Dover Railway	1953
Southill	Midland Railway	1962
Southport Ash Street	West Lancashire Railway	1902
Southport Central	West Lancashire Railway	1901
Southport Eastbank Street	Liverpool, Crosby and Southport Railway	1851
Southport London Street	East Lancashire Railway	1857
Southport Lord Street	Southport & Cheshire Lines Extension Railway	1952
Southport St. Lukes	Lancashire and Yorkshire Railway	1968
Southrey	GNR	1970
Southwaite	London and North Western Railway	1952
Southwark Park	South Eastern and Chatham Railway	1915
Southwater	London, Brighton and South Coast Railway	1966
Southwell	Midland Railway	1959
Southwick (Dumfries and Galloway)	Glasgow and South Western Railway	1965
Southwold	Southwold Railway	1929

=== Sp ===
Station (Town, unless in station name)	Rail company	Year closed
Spa Road (Bermondsey) (later named "Spa Road and Bermondsey")	London and Greenwich Railway	1915
Sparkford	GWR	1966
Sparrowlee	North Staffordshire Railway	1934
Speech House Road	Severn and Wye Railway	1929
Speen	GWR	1960
Speeton	NER	1970
Speke	London and North Western Railway	1930
Spelbrook	Northern and Eastern Railway	1842
Spellow	London and North Western Railway	1948
Spencer Road Halt	Woodside and South Croydon Railway	1915
Spennithorne	NER	1954
Spennymoor	NER	1952
Spetchley	Midland Railway	1855
Spetisbury Halt	Somerset and Dorset Joint Railway	1956
Spey Bay	Great North of Scotland Railway	1968
Spiersbridge	Glasgow, Barrhead and Kilmarnock Joint Railway	1849
Spilsby	GNR	1939
Spinkhill	LD&ECR	1939
Spinks Lane	Norfolk Railway	1845
Spofforth	NER	1964
Spon Lane	London and North Western Railway	1964
Sporle	East Anglian Railways	1850
Spratton	London and North Western Railway	1949
Spring Vale	Lancashire and Yorkshire Railway	1958
Springfield (Derbyshire)	Ashover Light Railway	1936
Springhead Halt	London and North Eastern Railway	1955
Springside	Glasgow and South Western Railway	1964
Springwell	NER	1872
Sprotborough	Hull and Barnsley Railway	1903
Sprotborough (SYR)	South Yorkshire Railway	1875
Sprouston	NER	1955

=== St ===
Station (Town, unless in station name)	Rail company	Year closed
Stacksteads	Lancashire and Yorkshire Railway	1966
Stafford Common	GNR	1939
Stafford Road (Wolverhampton)	Shrewsbury and Birmingham Railway	1852
Stafford Street (Willenhall)	Midland Railway	1931
Staincliffe and Batley Carr	London and North Western Railway	1952
Staincross and Mapplewell	Great Central Railway	1930
Staines High Street	L&SWR	1916
Staines West	GWR	1965
Stainforth	South Yorkshire Railway	1866
Stainland and Holywell Green	Lancashire and Yorkshire Railway	1929
Staintondale	NER	1965
Stairfoot	Great Central Railway	1957
Staithes	NER	1958
Stalbridge	Somerset and Dorset Joint Railway	1966
Stalybridge (L&Y)	Lancashire and Yorkshire Railway	1917
Staley and Millbrook	London and North Western Railway	1909
Stalham	Midland and Great Northern Joint Railway	1959
Stalybridge	Lancashire and Yorkshire Railway	1917
Stamford Bridge	York and North Midland Railway	1965
Stamford East	GNR	1957
Stanbridgeford	London and North Western Railway	1962
Standish	North Union Railway	1949
Standon	Great Eastern Railway	1964
Standon Bridge	London and North Western Railway	1952
Stane Street Halt	Great Eastern Railway	1952
Stanhoe	Great Eastern Railway	1952
Stanhope	NER	1953 reopened 2004
Stanley (Liverpool)	London and North Western Railway	1948
Stanley (Perthshire)	Caledonian Railway	1857
Stanley (West Yorkshire)	Methley Joint Railway	1964
Stanley Bridge Halt	GWR	1965
Stanley Junction	Caledonian Railway	1956
Stanmore Village	London and North Western Railway	1952
Stanner Halt	GWR	1951
Stannergate	Dundee and Arbroath Railway	1916
Stanningley	GNR	1968
Stannington	NER	1958
Stansfield Hall	Lancashire and Yorkshire Railway	1944 last train 1949 officially closed
Stanton	GWR	1953
Stanton Gate	Midland Railway	1967
Stanwardine Halt	GWR	1960
Staple	East Kent Light Railway	1948
Staple Edge Halt	GWR	1958
Staple Hill (Bristol)	Midland Railway	1966
Stapleford	London & North Eastern Railway	1939
Stapleford and Sandiacre	Midland Railway	1967
Star Crossing Halt	London and North Western Railway	1962
Starston	Great Eastern Railway	1866
Staveley Central	Great Central Railway	1963
Staveley Town	Midland Railway	1952
Staveley Works	Great Central Railway	1963
Staverton	GWR	1958 (Now operated by the South Devon Railway Trust)
Staverton Halt	GWR	1966
Staward	NER	1930
Steam Mills Crossing Halt	GWR	1930
Steele Road	North British Railway	1969
Steens Bridge	GWR	1952
Steeplehouse and Wirksworth	London and North Western Railway	1877
Steer Point	GWR	1947
Steeton and Silsden	Midland Railway	1965 reopened 1990
Stepford	Glasgow and South Western Railway	1943
Stepney (Hull)	NER	1964
Stepps	Caledonian	1962 reopened 1989
Stevenston Moorpark	Lanarkshire and Ayrshire Railway	1932
Steventon	GWR	1964
Stewarts Lane	London, Brighton and South Coast Railway	1858
Stewarts Lane	London, Chatham and Dover Railway	1867
Steyning	London, Brighton and South Coast Railway	1966
Stickney	GNR	1970
Stillington	NER	1952
Stirling Road	Caledonian Railway	1853
Stixwould	GNR	1970
Stoats Nest	London, Brighton and South Coast Railway	1856
Stobcross	Caledonian Railway	1959 reopened 1979 as Finnieston
Stobo	Caledonian Railway	1950
Stobs	North British Railway	1969
Stobs Camp	North British Railway	c. 1920
Stockbridge	London and South Western Railway	1964
Stockcross and Bagnor	GWR	1960
Stockingford	Midland Railway	1968
Stockport Portwood	Cheshire Lines Committee	1875
Stockport Tiviot Dale	Cheshire Lines Committee	1967
Stocksbridge platform	Stocksbridge Railway	1931
Stockton	Stockton and Darlington Railway	1848
Stockton Brook	North Staffordshire Railway	1956
Stoke (Suffolk)	Great Eastern Railway	1967
Stoke Bruern	East and West Junction Railway	1893
Stoke Canon	GWR	1894; 1960
Stoke Edith	GWR	1965
Stoke Ferry	Great Eastern Railway	1930
Stoke Golding	Ashby and Nuneaton Joint Railway	1931
Stoke Junction Halt	Southern Railway	1961
Stoke Prior Halt	GWR	1952
Stoke Works (GWR)	GWR	1966
Stoke Works	Midland Railway	1855
Stokes Bay	London and South Western Railway	1915
Stokesley	NER	1954
Stone Cross Halt	London, Brighton and South Coast Railway	1935
Stonea	Great Eastern Railway	1966
Stonehall and Lydden Halt	South Eastern and Chatham Railway	1954
Stonehouse (Strathclyde)	Caledonian Railway	1965
Stonehouse (Bristol Road) (Gloucestershire)	Midland Railway	1965
Stoneywood	Great North of Scotland Railway	1937
Stony Hill	Preston and Wyre Railway	1872
Stony Stratford	London and North Western Railway	1926
Storeton	Great Central Railway	1951
Stormont Loch Halt	Caledonian Railway	1955
Stortford Street	Grimsby & Immingham Electric Railway	1961
Stottesdon	Cleobury Mortimer and Ditton Priors Light Railway	1938
Stoulton	GWR	1966
Stourpaine and Durweston Halt	Somerset and Dorset Joint Railway	1956
Stourport-on-Severn	GWR	1970
Stourton	East and West Yorkshire Union Railways	1904
Stow	North British Railway	1969 reopened 2015
Stow Bardolph	Great Eastern Railway	1963
Stow Bedon	Great Eastern Railway	1964
Stow Park	GNR/Great Northern and Great Eastern Joint Railway	1961
Stow St Mary Halt	London and North Eastern Railway	1939
Stow-on-the-Wold	GWR	1962
Stracathro	Caledonian Railway	1938
Stradbroke	Mid-Suffolk Light Railway	1952
Strageath Halt	British Railways	1964
Strand Road Halt	Bideford, Westward Ho! and Appledore Railway	1917
Stranraer Town	Portpatrick and Wigtownshire Joint Railway	1966
Strap Lane Halt	GWR	1950
Strata Florida	GWR	1965
Stratford and Moreton Terminus	Oxford, Worcester and Wolverhampton Railway	1859
Stratford Market	Eastern Counties Railway	1957
Stratford-upon-Avon Old Town	Stratford-upon-Avon and Midland Junction Railway	1952
Stratford-upon-Avon Racecourse Platform	Great Western Railway	1968
Strathaven	Caledonian Railway	1904
Strathaven Central	Caledonian Railway	1965
Strathaven North	Caledonian Railway	1945
Strathblane	North British Railway	1951
Strathbungo	Glasgow, Barrhead and Kilmarnock Joint Railway	1962
Strathisla Mills	British Railways	1993
Strathmiglo	North British Railway	1950
Strathord	Caledonian	1931
Strathpeffer	Highland Railway	1946
Strathyre	Caledonian Railway	1965
Stratton	GWR	1953
Stratton Park Halt	GWR	1964
Stravithie	North British Railway	1930
Streetly	Midland Railway	1965
Strensall	NER	1930
Strensall Halt	LNER	1930
Stretford Bridge Junction Halt	Bishop's Castle Railway	1935
Stretham	Great Eastern Railway	1931
Stretton	Midland Railway	1961
Stretton	Ashover Light Railway	1936
Stretton and Claymills	North Staffordshire Railway	1949
Stretton-on-Fosse	GWR	1929
Strichen	Great North of Scotland Railway	1965
Stroud	Midland Railway	1947
Stroud Green	GNR	1954
Struan	Highland Railway	1965
Stubbins	Lancashire and Yorkshire Railway	1972
Studley and Astwood Bank	Midland Railway	1962
Sturmer	Great Eastern Railway	1967
Sturminster Newton	Somerset and Dorset Joint Railway	1966
Sturton	Great Central Railway	1959
Stutton	York and North Midland Railway	1905

=== Su ===
Station (Town, unless in station name)	Rail company	Year closed
Suckley	GWR	1964
Sudbury (Staffordshire)	North Staffordshire Railway	1966
Sulby Bridge	Manx Northern Railway	1968
Sulby Glen	Manx Northern Railway	1968
Sully	Taff Vale Railway	1968
Summer Lane	Manchester, Sheffield and Lincolnshire Railway	1959
Summerseat	Lancashire and Yorkshire Railway	1972 reopened 1987 by East Lancs Rly
Summerston	North British Railway	1951
Sun Bank Halt	GWR	1950
Sunderland Fawcett Street	NER	1879
Sunilaws	NER	1955
Sunny Wood Halt	Lancashire and Yorkshire Railway	1952
Surfleet	GNR	1961
Sutton (Cambridgeshire)	Great Eastern Railway	1878; 1931
Sutton Bingham Halt	London and South Western Railway	1962
Sutton Bridge	Midland and Great Northern Joint Railway	1959
Sutton Coldfield Town	Midland Railway	1925
Sutton Junction	Midland Railway	1964
Sutton Oak	London and North Western Railway	1951
Sutton Park	Midland Railway	1965
Sutton Scotney	GWR	1960
Sutton Staithe Halt	Midland and Great Northern Joint Railway	1935
Sutton Weaver	London and North Western Railway	1931
Sutton-in-Ashfield	Midland Railway	1949
Sutton-in-Ashfield Central	Great Central Railway	1956
Sutton-in-Ashfield Town	GNR	1956
Sutton-on-Hull	NER	1964
Sutton-on-Sea	GNR	1970

=== Sw ===
Station (Town, unless in station name)	Rail company	Year closed
Swadlincote	Midland Railway	1883; 1947
Swaffham	Great Eastern Railway	1968
Swaffham Prior	Great Eastern Railway	1962
Swainsthorpe	Great Eastern Railway	1954
Swalwell	NER	1953
Swan Village	GWR	1972
Swanage	London and South Western Railway	1972 (reopened 1982 by Swanage Railway, a heritage railway)
Swanbourne	London and North Western Railway	1968
Swanbridge Halt	Taff Vale Railway	1968
Swanley Junction	London, Chatham and Dover Railway	1939
Swannington	Midland Railway	1951
Swansea Bay	London and North Western Railway	1964
Swansea East Dock	Great Western Railway	1936
Swansea Riverside	Rhondda and Swansea Bay Railway	1933
Swansea Rutland Street	Swansea and Mumbles Railway	1960
Swansea St Thomas	Midland Railway	1950
Swansea Victoria	London and North Western Railway	1964
Swansea Wind Street	Great Western Railway	1936
Swavesey	Great Eastern Railway	1970
Swimbridge	GWR	1966
Swindon (Gloucestershire)	Birmingham and Gloucester Railway	1844
Swindon Town	Midland and South Western Junction Railway	1961
Swine	NER	1964
Swinton Central	Great Central Railway	1958
Swinton Town (South Yorkshire)	Midland Railway	1968
Swiss Cottage (Metropolitan)	Metropolitan Railway	1940

=== Sy ===
Station (Town, unless in station name)	Rail company	Year closed
Symington	Caledonian Railway	1965
Symonds Yat	GWR	1959
Syston	Midland Railway	1968 reopened 1994
