= Strathaven railway station =

Strathaven railway station may refer to:

- Strathaven railway station (1863–1904), a disused railway station near Flemington, South Lanarkshire briefly known as Strathaven North in 1904
- Strathaven Central railway station, a disused railway station in Strathaven, South Lanarkshire commonly known as Strathaven
- Strathaven North railway station, a disused railway station in Strathaven, South Lanarkshire
