= Southill railway station =

Former railway station in Bedfordshire, England

Coordinates: 52.068524°N 0.353454°W

Southill
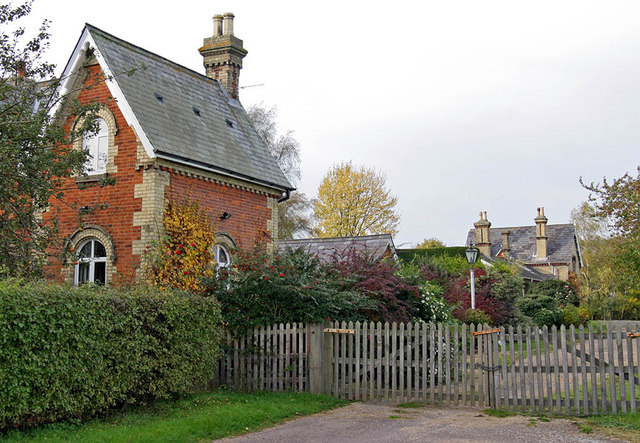
- Station building in 2006

General information
- Location: Southill, Central Bedfordshire; England
- Grid reference: TL129424
- Platforms: 2

Other information
- Status: Disused

History
- Original company: Midland Railway
- Post-grouping: London, Midland and Scottish Railway; London Midland Region of British Railways

Key dates
- 8 May 1857: Opened
- 1 January 1962: Closed
Location

Southill was a railway station on the Bedford to Hitchin Line which served the village of Southill in Bedfordshire, England. Opened in 1857, it gave more than a century of service before closing in 1962.

== History ==
Southill station was opened by the Midland Railway in 1857 as part of its new line from Leicester to Hitchin via Bedford, enabling it to reach London King's Cross station by having running powers over Great Northern Railway metals from Hitchin southwards. However, the Midland Railway's own direct route to London St. Pancras station from Bedford via Luton (today's Midland Main Line), opened in 1868, relegated the Bedford to Hitchin section to mere branch status. Passenger traffic over this section fell to minimal and services were reduced to a shuttle by 1880. The section between Southill and Shefford was the only part to remain double-tracked after 1911.

The station was convenient for Southill Park, the seat of the Whitbread family who had supported and brought their influence to bear on the realisation of the line. On 3 June 1890 a new signal box was opened at Southill as part of the introduction of block telegraph working between the station and the Midland Goods Yard at Hitchin.

The inter-war years saw a decline in traffic with the introduction of buses between Bedford and Hitchin. Traffic picked up again during the Second World War when troop specials were run to enable conscripts to return home from the RAF camps at Cardington and Henlow. The introduction of railbuses after the war did little to improve traffic, and the line closed in 1962.

=== Stationmasters ===
- James Boaden ca. 1859 ca. 1866
- William May until 1872
- G. Clarke 1872 - 1873
- Joseph Cherry from 1873 - 1890
- Frederick Brooks 1890 - 1898 (afterwards station master at Flitwick)
- Edward Arnold 1898 - ca. 1908
- Frank G. Sugars 1909 - 1921 (also station master at Shefford, afterwards station master at Pye Bridge)
- Alfred Ballard 1921 - 1930 (formerly station master at Old Dalby, also station master at Shefford)

Preceding station	Disused railways	Following station
Cardington Workmen's; Platform	London, Midland and Scottish Railway; Bedford to Hitchin Line	Shefford

== Present day ==
The station building has been converted into a private residence. The ticket window remains, as does the platform area, sidings and cattle pen which have been incorporated into the garden. Not far from the station in Southill Park is a stone obelisk erected in 1864 in honour of William Henry Whitbread whose influence and energy helped bring about the Bedford to Hitchin line.
