= Meikle Earnock Halt railway station =

Disused railway station in Meikle Earnock, South Lanarkshire

Meikle Earnock

General information
- Location: Meikle Earnock, South Lanarkshire; Scotland
- Coordinates: 55.7554°N 4.0608°W
- Grid reference: NS707532
- Platforms: 2

Other information
- Status: Disused

History
- Original company: Hamilton and Strathaven Railway
- Pre-grouping: Caledonian Railway
- Post-grouping: London, Midland and Scottish Railway

Key dates
- 2 February 1863: Opened as Meikle Earnock
- 1941: Name changed to Meikle Earnock Halt
- 12 December 1943: Closed
Location

Meikle Earnock Halt railway station served the suburb of Meikle Earnock, South Lanarkshire, Scotland, from 1863 to 1943 on the Hamilton and Strathaven Railway.

== History ==
The station was opened as Meikle Earnock on 2 February 1863 by the Hamilton and Strathaven Railway. On the southbound platform was the station building and on the east side was the signal box. To the south was a marshalling yard, Eddiewood Junction Yard. To the north was a mineral line that ran to Earnock Quarry. The station's name was changed to Meikle Earnock Halt in 1941, a year after it was downgraded to an unstaffed halt in 1940. The station closed on 12 December 1943.

Preceding station	Disused railways	Following station
High Blantyre; Line and station closed	Hamilton and Strathaven Railway	Quarter; Line and station closed
