= Cardington Workmen's Platform railway station =

Former railway station in Bedfordshire, England

Coordinates: 52.109667°N 0.409009°W

Cardington Workmen's Platform

General information
- Location: Cardington, Borough of Bedford; England
- Grid reference: TL090468
- Platforms: 1

Other information
- Status: Disused

History
- Original company: Midland Railway
- Pre-grouping: Midland Railway

Key dates
- September 1917: Opened
- 3 October 1921: Closed
Location

Cardington Workmen's Platform was a railway station on the Bedford to Hitchin Line which served the Royal Air Force station near the village of Cardington in Bedfordshire, England. A short-lived halt, it opened during the First World War and closed in 1921.

== History ==
During the First World War a Royal Air Force station was established in Cardington which substantially increased passenger and freight traffic on the Bedford to Hitchin Line. In order to provide easier access to the airbase, a halt was opened beside the road bridge carrying the Southill Road over the line. After the halt closed to passenger traffic in 1921, numerous sidings were constructed on the site to serve the camp and these were used to receive materials needed for the construction of the R100 and R101 airships. The site was also used during the Second World War for troop specials which enabled conscripts to return home from the RAF camp.

| Preceding station | Disused railways | Following station |
|---|---|---|
| Cardington | London, Midland and Scottish Railway; Bedford to Hitchin Line | Southill |

== Present day ==
Nothing remains of the halt today.
