= Quarter railway station =

Disused railway station in Quarter, South Lanarkshire

Quarter
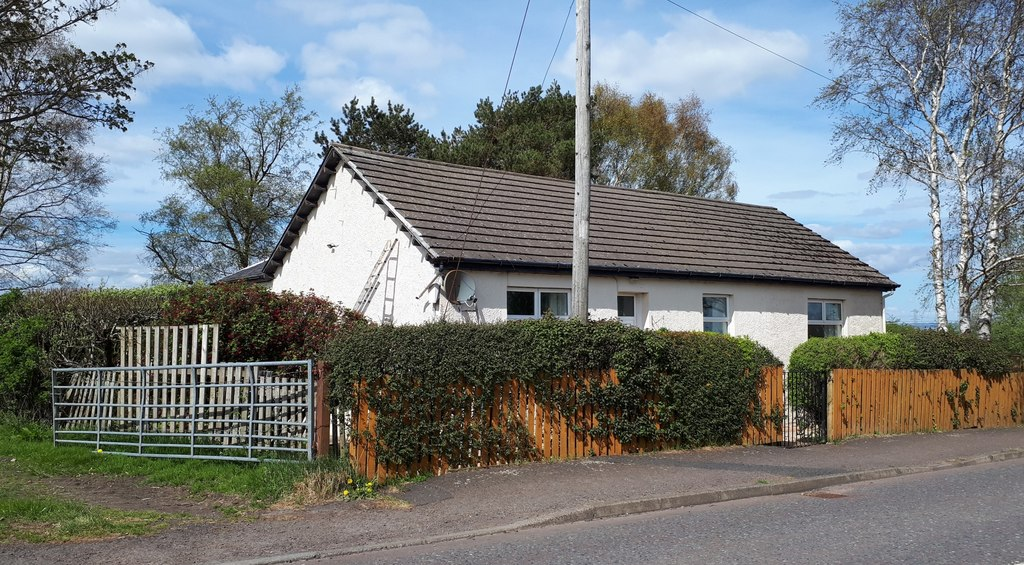
- The station cottage in 2020

General information
- Location: Quarter, South Lanarkshire; Scotland
- Coordinates: 55.7357°N 4.0429°W
- Grid reference: NS718510
- Platforms: 1

Other information
- Status: Disused

History
- Original company: Hamilton and Strathaven Railway
- Pre-grouping: Caledonian Railway
- Post-grouping: London, Midland and Scottish Railway

Key dates
- 2 February 1863: Opened
- 1 May 1909: Name changed to Quarter Road
- 1 October 1945: Closed
Location

Quarter railway station served the village of Quarter, South Lanarkshire, Scotland, from 1863 to 1945 on the Hamilton and Strathaven Railway.

== History ==
The station was opened on 2 February 1863 by the Hamilton and Strathaven Railway. On the east side was the goods yard and at the south end was the signal box. There was a siding to the west which served a quarry and a siding to the east, called Fairholm Siding, which served Fairholm Colliery. A new signal box opened to the north in 1907. The station closed on 1 October 1945.

Preceding station	Disused railways	Following station
Meikle Earnock Halt; Line and station closed	Hamilton and Strathaven Railway	Glassford; Line and station closed
