= Stewart's =

Stewart's or Stewarts can refer to:

- Stewart's Fountain Classics, brand of soft drink
  - Stewart's Restaurants, chain of restaurants where the soft drink was originally sold
- Stewart's wilt, bacterial disease affecting maize
- Stewart's (department store), defunct Baltimore, Maryland-based chain of department stores
- Stewart Dry Goods, defunct Louisville, Kentucky-based chain of department stores
- A.T. Stewart and Company, Alexander Turney Stewart's New York City department store
- Stewarts Supermarket Limited, former chain of supermarkets in Northern Ireland
- Stewart's Shops, chain of convenience stores in Upstate New York
- Stewart's theorem in trigonometry
- House of Stuart (also spelt "Stewart"), rulers of Scotland from the 14th century and England from the 17th century
- Stewart's Lane was a nineteenth century road in London that gave its name to
  - Stewarts Lane railway stations
  - Stewarts Lane locomotive depot

== See also ==
- Stuart's Department Stores of New England
