= Shefford railway station =

Former railway station in Bedfordshire, England

Coordinates: 52.038377°N 0.336950°W

Shefford

General information
- Location: Shefford, Central Bedfordshire; England
- Grid reference: TL141390
- Platforms: 2

Other information
- Status: Disused

History
- Original company: Midland Railway
- Post-grouping: London, Midland and Scottish Railway; London Midland Region of British Railways

Key dates
- 8 May 1857: Opened
- 1 January 1962: Closed to passengers
- 28 December 1964: Closed to goods
Location

Shefford was a railway station on the Bedford to Hitchin Line which served the town of Shefford in Bedfordshire, England. Opened in 1857, it gave more than a century of service before closing in 1962.

== History ==
Shefford station was opened by the Midland Railway in 1857 as part of its line from Bedford to Hitchin, part of an original scheme to allow its Midland Main Line a direct route to London using the rival Great Northern Railway metals from Hitchin. When this did not work out, the Great Northern giving preference to their trains at the Hitchin junction, the Midland decided to build a new line south from Bedford to their new St Pancras station in London. This new section opened in 1868. This Passenger traffic over the Bedford to Hitchin section then became minimal and services were reduced to a shuttle by 1880. The section between Southill and Shefford was the only part to remain double-tracked after 1911.

The station building differed from the others on the line in that it was originally constructed of wood and stood on the viaduct which carried the line across Shefford High Street. Following nationalisation in 1948, British Railways demolished the station building and replaced it with a pre-fabricated concrete structure at road level. The platforms were replaced by timber ones which came from Carpenders Park station. The station's goods yard was located on the opposite site of the High Street, and despite its small size, it still managed to handle a substantial amount of agricultural traffic.

The inter-war years saw a decline in traffic with the introduction of buses between Bedford and Hitchin. Traffic picked up again during the Second World War when troop specials were run to enable conscripts to return home from the RAF camps at Cardington and Henlow. The introduction of railbuses after the war did little to improve traffic, and the line closed in 1962.

=== Stationmasters ===
- W. Peacock until 1861
- R.V. Warwick 1861 - 1862
- J. Ward 1862 - 1863
- C. Tidball 1863 - 1864
- I. Broom from 1864
- Luke Fox ca. 1871 until 1875
- Daniel Heath from 1875 - 1887
- F. Watkin 1887 - 1890
- John Walters 1890 - 1898
- Frederick Christian 1898 - 1909
- Frank G. Sugars 1909 - 1921 (also station master at Southill, afterwards station master at Pye Bridge)
- Alfred Ballard 1921 - 1930 (formerly station master at Old Dalby, also station master at Southill)
- John F. Georgeson ca. 1946 (also station master at Henlow)
- R.C.T. Wilson from 1950 (formerly station master at Manton)

Preceding station	Disused railways	Following station
Southill	London, Midland and Scottish Railway; Bedford to Hitchin Line	Henlow Camp

== Present day ==
The station buildings were demolished soon after closure to make way for new housing, with the viaduct following in November 1976. The housing estate is situated on a road named "Old Station Way". After the line had closed, a proposal was made to re-use the trackbed as part of a bypass for the town, but this idea was not pursued. The site of the goods yard is now the location of Shefford Industrial Park.
