= Henlow Camp railway station =

Former railway station in Bedfordshire, England

Coordinates: 52.007680°N 0.302887°W

Henlow Camp
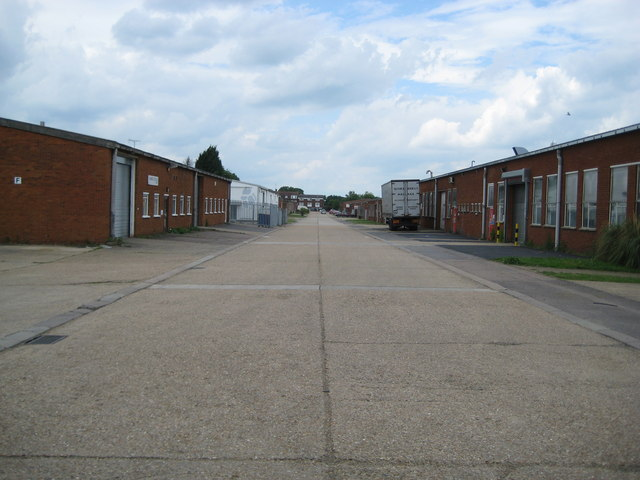
- Station site in 2010.

General information
- Location: Henlow, Central Bedfordshire; England
- Grid reference: TL165357
- Platforms: 2

Other information
- Status: Disused

History
- Original company: Midland Railway
- Pre-grouping: Midland Railway
- Post-grouping: London, Midland and Scottish Railway; London Midland Region of British Railways

Key dates
- 8 May 1857: Opened as Henlow
- 1 March 1933: Renamed Henlow Camp
- 1 January 1962: Closed to passengers
- 2 December 1963: Closed to goods
Location

Henlow Camp was a railway station on the Bedford to Hitchin Line which served the village of Henlow in Bedfordshire, England. Opened in 1857, it gave more than a century of service before closing in 1962.

== History ==
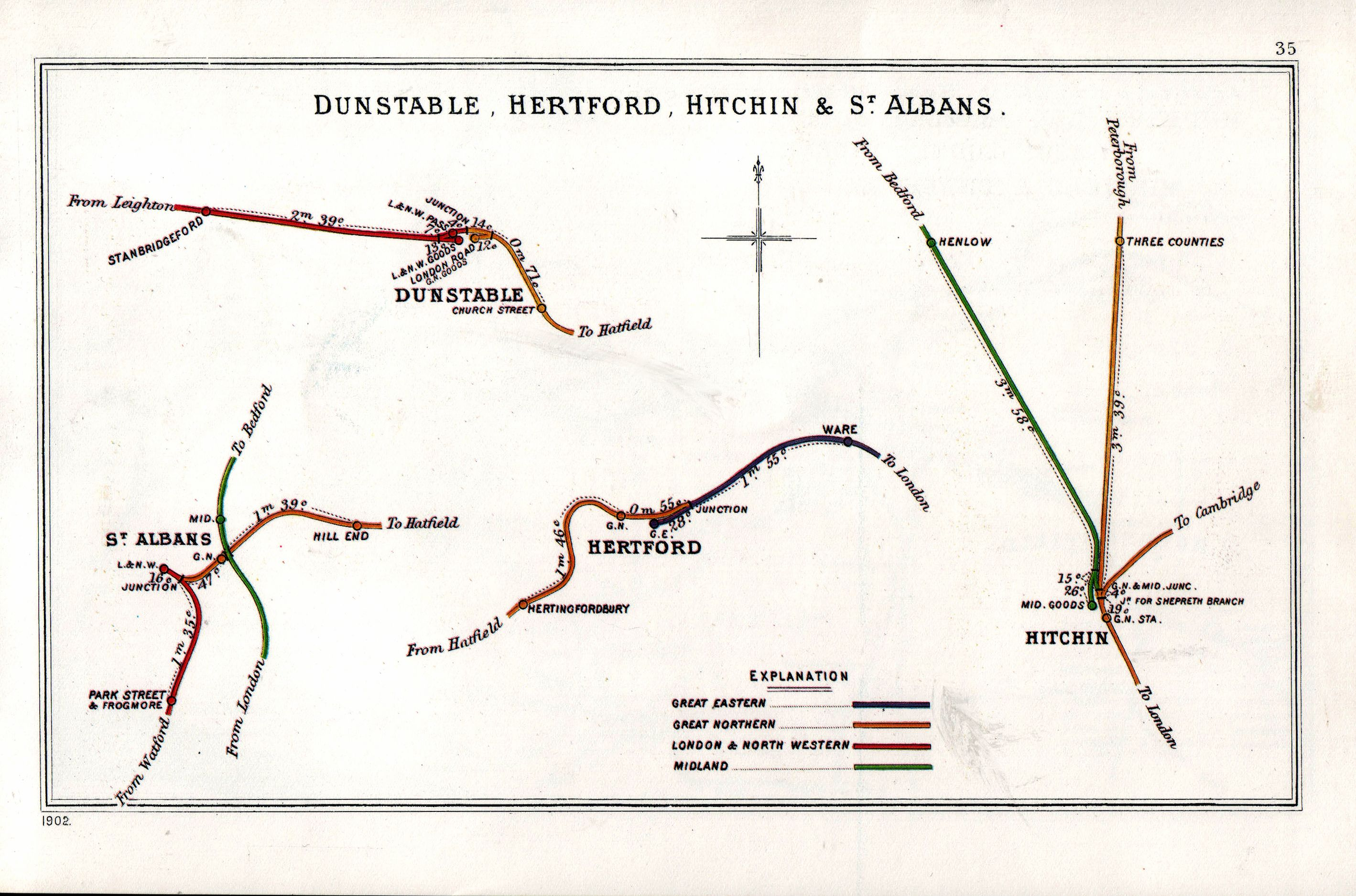
A 1902 Railway Clearing House map of railways in the vicinity of Henlow Camp (upper right, shown here as Henlow)

The Midland Railway first opened a station named "Henlow" some distance from the village of the same name, as part of its new line from Bedford to Hitchin, part of a larger scheme to allow its Midland Main Line a direct route to London without using rival Great Northern Railway metals. Passenger traffic over the Bedford to Hitchin section was minimal and services were reduced to a shuttle by 1880. The section between Shefford and Hitchin, including Henlow, was single-tracked in 1911.

The establishment of RAF Henlow at the end of the First World War increased passenger and freight traffic through the station which was located opposite the airbase. The activity continued after the war when the base became the location of the RAF Signals Engineering Establishment, and a depot for the repair and construction of aircraft as well as a training centre for the engineers; it became the School of Aeronautical Engineering in 1924. To reflect this development, the railway station's name was changed in 1933 to "Henlow Camp".

The inter-war years saw a decline in traffic with the introduction of buses between Bedford and Hitchin. Traffic picked up again during the Second World War when troop specials were run to enable conscripts to return home from the RAF camps at Cardington and Henlow. The introduction of railbuses after the war did little to improve traffic, and the line closed in 1962.

=== Stationmasters ===
- J. Heath until 1860
- Benjamin Maulding 1860 - ca. 1866
- John Gregory until 1872
- S. Martin 1872 - 1881
- John Johnson 1881 - 1888
- William George Hall 1888 - 1902 (afterwards station master at Flitwick)
- Thomas Oliver Baker 1902 - ca. 1911 (afterwards station master at Yate)
- Robert Arthur Gill 1914 - 1921 (afterwards station master at Hemel Hempstead)
- G.J. Marshall ca. 1937
- Frederick William Booker ca. 1940 (also station master at Arlesey)
- John F. Georgeson ca. 1946 (also station master at Shefford)

Preceding station	Disused railways	Following station
Shefford	London, Midland and Scottish Railway; Bedford to Hitchin Line	Hitchin

== Present day ==
No trace remains of the railway at Henlow, a small commercial development having been built on the trackbed.
