= Strathaven railway station (1863–1904) =

Disused railway station in Flemington, South Lanarkshire

Strathaven North

General information
- Location: Strathaven; Scotland
- Coordinates: 55.6814°N 4.056°W
- Grid reference: NS708450
- Platforms: 1

Other information
- Status: Disused

History
- Original company: Hamilton and Strathaven Railway
- Pre-grouping: Caledonian Railway
- Post-grouping: London Midland and Scottish Railway

Key dates
- 2 February 1863: Opened as Strathaven
- 4 July 1904: Name changed to Strathaven North
- 1 October 1904: Closed
Location

Strathaven North railway station served Flemington, a neighbourhood of Strathaven in Scotland, from 1863 to 1904 on the Hamilton and Strathaven Railway.

== History ==
The station was opened as Strathaven on 2 February 1863 by the Hamilton and Strathaven Railway. Despite its name, it was situated closer to Flemington than Strathaven. It had a goods yard on the west, a locomotive shed to the east and a signal box, which opened in 1893 and closed in 1904. The station's name was changed on 4 July 1904 to Strathaven North. It was replaced by a newer station of the same name situated a short distance further east on 1 October 1904. The old station became a goods yard called Flemington with a few extra sidings. The locomotive shed closed. The site is now a housing estate.

Preceding station	Disused railways	Following station
Glassford; Line and station closed	Hamilton and Strathaven Railway	Strathaven North; Line and station closed
