= Sutton Hall, Sutton Weaver =

Farmhouse in Cheshire, England

Sutton Hall
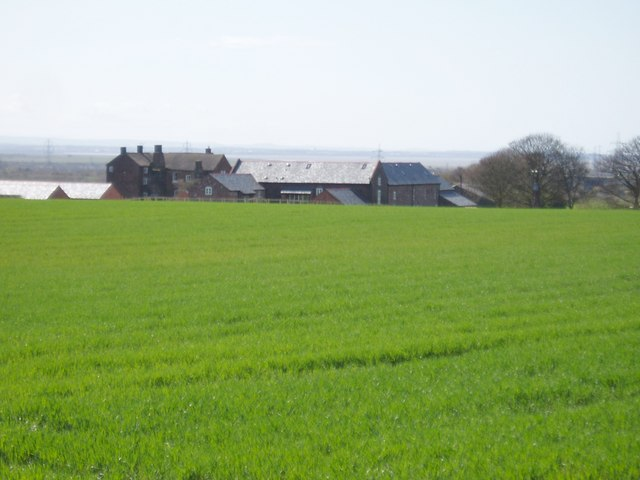
- Sutton Hall seen from Aston Lane (2006)

- Location in Cheshire
- 53.3067°N 2.6844°W
- OS grid reference: SJ 544 790

Listed Building – Grade I
- Designated: 8 January 1970
- Reference no.: 1253572

Sutton Hall is a historic farmhouse, south of the village of Sutton Weaver in Cheshire, England. It is recorded in the National Heritage List for England as a designated Grade I listed building.

The hall dates from the late 15th or early 16th century, and it was extended in the late 17th and early 19th century. It is built in brown brick in two storeys with attics. Internally there are two superimposed great halls which are a "feature of unique interest". Figueirdo and Treuherz consider that it is "one of the most important and least known late medieval timber-framed houses in Cheshire".

The associated barn and shippon, which date from the late 17th century, are listed at Grade II. Also listed at Grade II is a circular feeding trough in the farmyard dating from the 19th century, which is made from a single stone and measures almost 2 metres across and 1 metre high. The hall is now a farmhouse, and the barn has been converted for residential use.

== See also ==
- Grade I listed buildings in Cheshire West and Chester
- Listed buildings in Sutton, Cheshire West and Chester
