= Sutton Weaver =

Village in Cheshire, England

Coordinates: 53.310°N 2.685°W

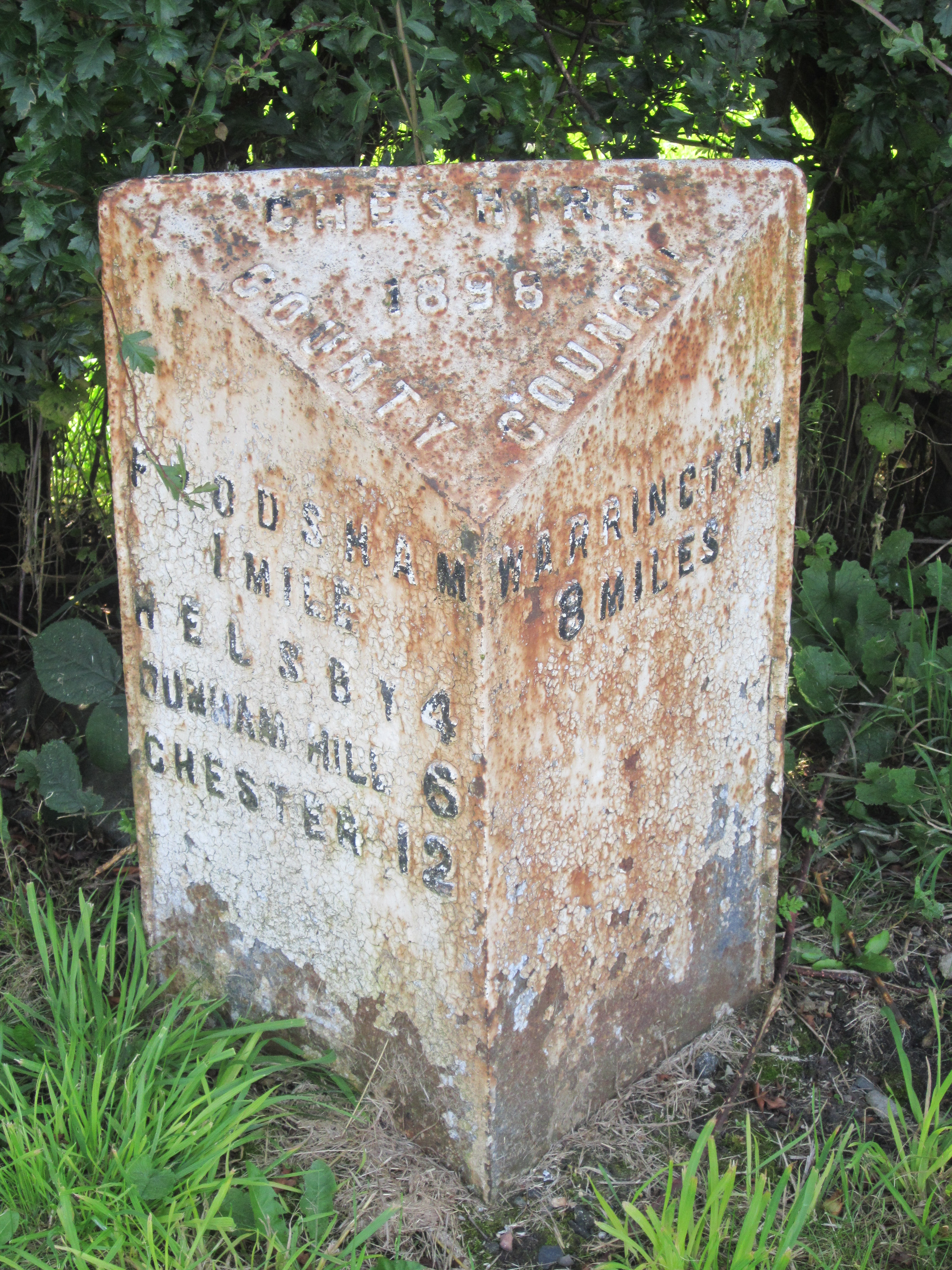
- Sutton Weaver

- Location within Cheshire
- Population: 495 (2011 census)
- OS grid reference: SJ544794
  - London: 165.3 miles (266.0 km) SE
- Civil parish: Sutton Weaver
- Unitary authority: Cheshire West and Chester
- Ceremonial county: Cheshire
- Region: North West
- Country: England
- Sovereign state: United Kingdom
- Post town: RUNCORN
- Postcode district: WA7
- Dialling code: 01928
- Police: Cheshire
- Fire: Cheshire
- Ambulance: North West
- UK Parliament: Tatton

Sutton Weaver is a village and civil parish in the unitary authority of Cheshire West and Chester, in the ceremonial county of Cheshire, England. It is 2 miles (3.2 km) northeast of Frodsham and 2.5 miles (4 km) south of Runcorn. According to the 2011 United Kingdom census, it had a population of 495 and a total land area of 3,198 sq metres (m2) (thousands). The village has 206 Households with some of the main industries of the village being Wholesale and Retail Trade, Human Health and Social Work Activities and Manufacturing; These three sectors alone account for 36.5% of Occupational Share.

== History ==
In the 1870s, Sutton Weaver was described as:

"SUTTON, a township in Runcorn parish, Cheshire; at Runcorn-Road r. station, 2 miles NE of Frodsham. It has a post-office under Preston-Brook. Acres, 1,181. Real property, £2,719. Pop., 356. Houses, 63. The manor belongs to the representatives of the late Sir A. J. Aston." – John Marius Wilson (1870–72)

The parish was renamed in April 2015 after a review of town and parish councils in the Cheshire West and Chester unitary authority. At the same time a small amount of land in the west of the parish was given up to Frodsham. The parish should not be confused with a different Cheshire parish called Sutton, in Cheshire East. The "Weaver" affix comes from the River Weaver, and may have been first added when the railway station opened in 1869.

== Population ==
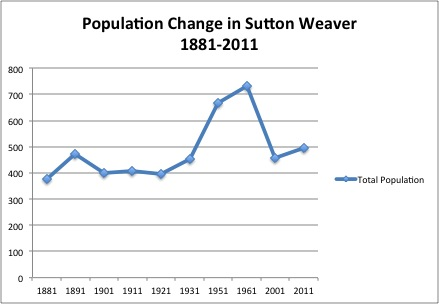
Sutton Weaver Time Series 1881–2011

The first recorded census had occurred in 1881 with the population of Sutton Weaver being 337. A census was then carried out every ten years up until 1961. Information and statistics were available on total population, population change, gender and area throughout the time the census were being carried out. However, there were no records for the census in 1941 due to the Second World War. There is no great change in population from 1881 to 1931, after which time 1951 and 1961 there was a large increase in the population up to a total of 733, almost double the first record in 1881. Some of this may have been from the result of the post–World War II baby boom (1946–1964). When the census starts up again in 2001, the population is back down to 457, which was around the same 80 years before. This is mainly due to the boundary changes in the parish.

== Transport ==
Within Sutton Weaver lie a total of 340 vehicles; with 54.4% of its population accounting for 2 Cars or Vans in each household, 12 households do not own a car or van. There is one bus (X30) that runs through the parish Monday to Saturday and a further three others skirting Sutton Weaver.

Directly South-West it is enclosed via one of the London and North Western Railway lines, heading from North to South, under which the A557 leads through the railway bridge towards Beechwood, It is also directly linked to Frodsham Via the A56.

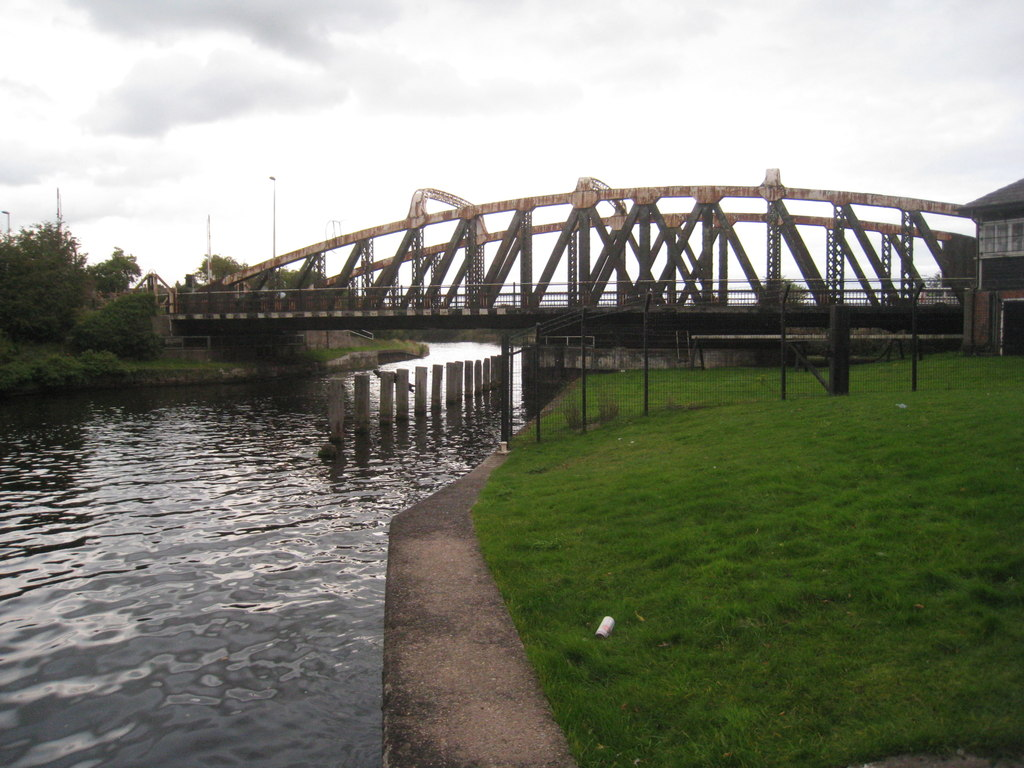
Sutton Weaver Swing Bridge from the east

The Sutton Weaver Swing Bridge is situated on the A56 between the village of Sutton Weaver and the town of Frodsham. The present bridge was constructed in 1926 and is a vital transport link across the River Weaver. The 90-year-old structure which carries an estimated 20,000 vehicles per day has been granted the go ahead for £4.5m upgrade. Cheshire West And Chester Council (CWAC) is expected to pay the £3.5m with British Waterways to foot the remaining £1m. Work is estimated to take 10 months. It will remain open to pedestrians but the road will reduce to a single lane controlled by traffic lights.

Although it used to have its own railway station which opened on 1 April 1869 and was situated on the east side of Station Road near to the railway bridge. The station closed to passengers in 1931 and completely closed in 1942. The nearest train station to Sutton Weaver is Runcorn East railway station, which is located 2.1 miles North-East.

== Housing ==
Sutton Weaver's Office for National Statistics Urban/Rural Category has been described as a hamlet or isolated settlement in inhabited countryside. The typical type of housing for the area is detached and semi-detached, with a few flats. There are a total of 206 households, of which 84 households are owned outright. The average asking price for a property being £329,483 and the average rent for the area standing at £1,950 per calendar month.

== Listed buildings ==
Sutton Weaver only has one Grade I listed building: Sutton Hall is to the south of the village (grid reference SJ544790). The hall dates from the late 15th century or the early 16th century, and it was extended in the late 17th century and in the early 19th century. It is built in brown brick in two storeys with attics. Internally there are two superimposed great halls which are a "feature of unique interest". The associated barn and shippon, which date from the late 17th century, are listed Grade II. Also listed Grade II is a circular feeding trough in the farmyard dating from the 19th century which is made from a single stone and measures almost 2 metres across and 1 metre high. The hall is now a farmhouse, and the barn has been converted for residential use.

== Geography ==
The village is situated 165.3 miles (266.0 km) from the centre of London, and 12.2 miles (19.6 km) from the county town of Chester. The closest settlement include Brookvale, Preston Brook and Frodsham. Other local villages include Halton, Norton and Dutton. Sutton Weaver is 50 m (160 ft) above sea level.

Sutton Weaver generally has quite a temperate climate, due to its proximity to the west coast and the Irish Sea. The mean average temperature in the years 1971 to 2000 was 9.8 to 10.1 °C (49.6 to 50.2 °F), which was above the average of 8.8 to 9.3 °C (47.8 to 48.7 °F) for the United Kingdom.

== See also ==
- Listed buildings in Sutton, Cheshire West and Chester
