= Listed buildings in Sutton, Cheshire West and Chester =

Sutton Weaver is a civil parish in Cheshire West and Chester, England. It is largely rural, and contains the village of Sutton Weaver. The parish is traversed in a north–south direction by the M56 motorway, the A56 road, and the Chester to Manchester Line, and from east to west by the River Weaver and the Weaver Navigation, and the A533 road. It contains twelve buildings that are recorded in the National Heritage List for England as designated listed buildings. Of these one is listed at Grade I, another at Grade II*, and the other ten at Grade II. The structures include houses, farm buildings, and bridges. Most of them are houses or farm buildings, but there is also a bridge and two viaducts.

== Key ==
Grade	Criteria
Grade I	Buildings of exceptional interest, sometimes considered to be internationally important.
Grade II*	Particularly important buildings of more than special interest.
Grade II	Buildings of national importance and special interest.

== Buildings ==
Name and location	Photograph	Date	Notes	Grade
Sutton Hall; 53.3067°N 2.6844°W	—	15th century	The hall was extended later. Externally it is constructed in brown brick. The hall has two storeys and attics, and contains timber-framed medieval halls that were encased in brick in the 18th century.	I
Barn, Sutton; 53.3104°N 2.6852°W	—	Early 17th century	This is a timber-framed with brick infill and some wattle-and-daub, which has been partly rebuilt in brick. The former thatched roof has been replaced by asbestos. It has later been used for storage.	II
Cottage, Sutton; 53.3106°N 2.6850°W	—	Early 17th century	The cottage has earlier internal features, and probably incorporates a timber-framed core. It stands on a sandstone plinth, has a pebbledashed exterior, and a thatched roof. There is a 19th-century brick rear wing.	II*
Marchgate Farmhouse; 53.3049°N 2.6985°W	—	Early 17th century	The house, which has been subsequently altered, is timber-framed with brick infill, and has been partly rebuilt. The front of the cross wing was added in about 1830, and has a casement window in the lower storey and a horizontal sliding sash window above.	II
Barn and shippon, Sutton Hall; 53.3070°N 2.6837°W	—	Late 17th century	Originally a barn, stable and shippon, this is an L-shaped building constructed in brick with slate roofs, and has two storeys plus attics.	II
Barn, Marchgate Farmhouse; 53.3049°N 2.6982°W	—	Early 18th century (probable)	A brown brick building with a slate roof to the east of the farmhouse.	II
Mill House; 53.3020°N 2.7071°W	—	c. 1820	Originally part of a water-powered corn mill, this has been later used as an office building. The building is in painted brick, the front of which is pebbledashed, and it is symmetrical with two storeys and an attic. It has a two-storey pedimented porch and sash windows.	II
Viaduct over River Weaver, Number 53; 53.3025°N 2.7089°W		1848–50	Built to carry the Birkenhead, Lancashire and Cheshire Junction Railway over the River Weaver. The engineer was Alexander Rendel, and the contractor Thomas Brassey. There are two cast iron arches across the river, approached by two brick and sandstone arches on the west bank and 21 similar arches on the east bank.	II
Viaduct over Weaver Navigation, Number 54; 53.3059°N 2.7014°W		1848–50	Built to carry the Birkenhead, Lancashire and Cheshire Junction Railway over the Weaver Navigation and the A557 road. The engineer was Alexander Rendel, and the contractor Thomas Brassey. It consists of a cast iron span over the navigation and a brick arch on each side.	II
Frodsham Bridge; 53.3009°N 2.7068°W		1850	A bridge carrying the A56 road over the River Weaver on three arches, in red sandstone and limestone.	II
Feeding trough, Sutton Hall; 53.30697°N 2.68388°W	—	19th century (probable)	A massive circular feeding trough made from a single piece of red stone, nearly 2 metres (7 ft) in diameter and 1 metre (3 ft) high.	II
Boatman's shelter 53.30483°N 2.69891°W		Mid 19th century	A brick structure with a pyramidal slate roof, it is now unused. The door, which is under a sandstone lintel, and the windows, are all boarded-up.	II
