= Old Warden Tunnel =

Disused railway tunnel in Bedfordshire, England

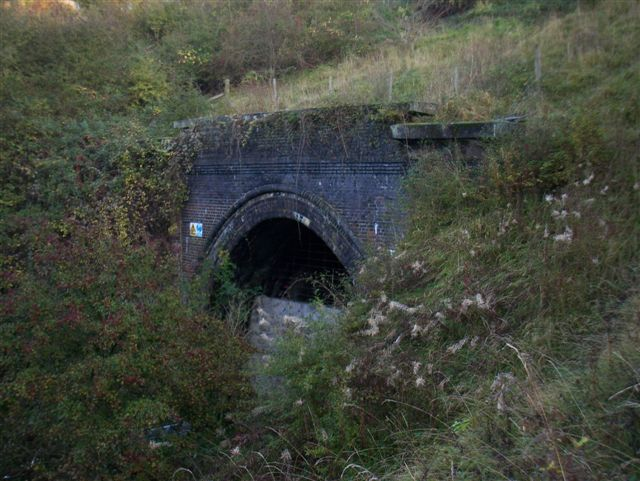
- The northern entrance to the tunnel, 2006
- Interactive map of Old Warden Tunnel

Overview
- Line: Bedford to Hitchin Line
- Location: Old Warden, Bedfordshire, England
- Coordinates: 52.088347°N 0.37581°W
- Status: Abandoned

Technical
- Length: 882 yards (807 m)

The Old Warden Tunnel is a disused railway tunnel on the former Bedford and Hitchin railway line, near the village of Old Warden in Bedfordshire.

== History ==
The tunnel was built as part of the Midland Railway connecting Bedford and Hitchin. Construction began in 1853 and the line opened on 7 May 1857. It was operable for over 100 years before losing its passenger services a year before the Beeching Axe on 1 January 1962. Goods services between Shefford and Bedford succumbed to the Beeching Axe on 28 December 1964.

== Construction ==
Built of blue engineering bricks, the tunnel is ovoid in shape and runs at a very slight gradient to allow drainage; however, it is perfectly straight in alignment.

The tunnel has no blast relief ducts, due to its lack of curves and relatively short length, allowing good air passage. Regular niches were cut into the wall to allow maintenance on the permanent way during running hours. Both portals were capped with stone and it covers a total length of 882 yards (807 m).

The tunnel can be seen in the film Those Magnificent Men in Their Flying Machines into which they fly. The location where Sir Percy's aircraft lands on a train is the same disused line from Bedford to Hitchin. The tunnel had only recently been closed, and in the panning shot through the railway cutting, the cooling towers of the now-demolished Goldington power station can be seen.

== The tunnel today ==
The tunnel has lain derelict for over 60 years, but is in fair condition, with the southern (Hitchin) end back-filled to within seven feet (2.1 m) of the tunnel roof and the northern (Bedford) end bricked up with gratings to allow access for bats. However, public access has been closed at both ends. Entrance to the tunnel is not recommended, due to bats and standing water accumulation. The northern portal is still visible in its cutting, but the southern portal is entirely covered in undergrowth.

== Nature reserve ==
The land above the tunnel is Old Warden Tunnel nature reserve, which is managed by the Wildlife Trust for Bedfordshire, Cambridgeshire and Northamptonshire.

== See also ==
- List of tunnels in the United Kingdom

== Bibliography ==
- Davies, R.; Grant, M.D. (1984). Forgotten Railways: Chilterns and Cotswolds. Newton Abbot, Devon: David St John Thomas. ISBN 0-946537-07-0.
- Oppitz, Leslie (2000). Lost Railways of the Chilterns (Lost Railways Series). Newbury, Berkshire: Countryside Books. ISBN 978-1-85306-643-6.
