= Glassford railway station =

Disused railway station in Glassford, South Lanarkshire

Glassford
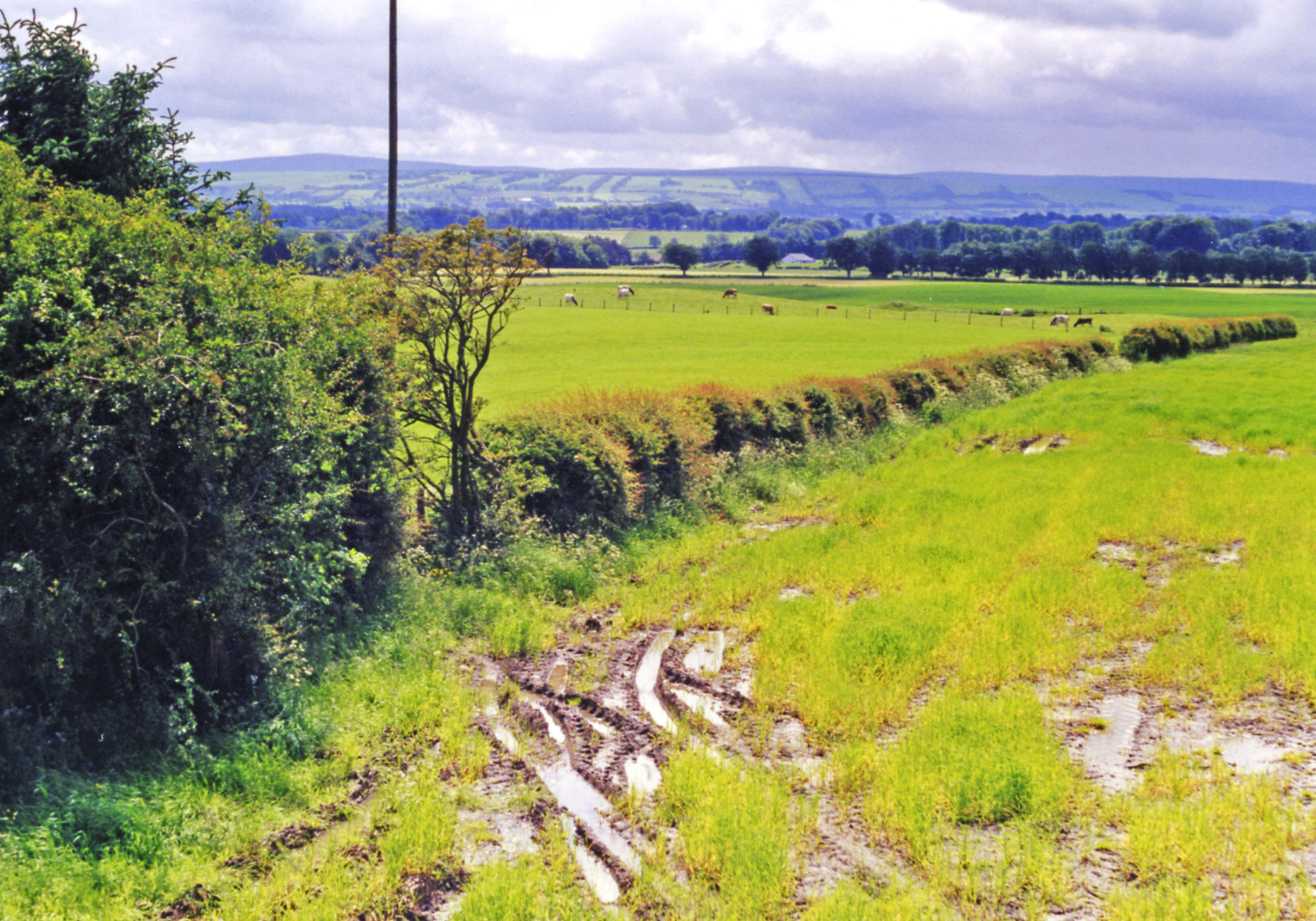
- The site of the station, looking south towards Strathaven, in 1998

General information
- Location: Glassford, South Lanarkshire; Scotland
- Coordinates: 55.7051°N 4.0522°W
- Grid reference: NS711476
- Platforms: 1

Other information
- Status: Disused

History
- Original company: Hamilton and Strathaven Railway
- Pre-grouping: Caledonian Railway
- Post-grouping: London, Midland and Scottish Railway

Key dates
- 2 February 1863: Opened
- 1 October 1945: Closed to passengers
- 21 September 1953: Closed to goods
Location

Glassford railway station served the village of Glassford, South Lanarkshire, Scotland, from 1863 to 1953 on the Hamilton and Strathaven Railway.

== History ==
The station was opened on 2 February 1863 by the Hamilton and Strathaven Railway. To the east was the goods yard and nearby was the signal box, which was built in 1891 and closed in 1906, being replaced by a ground frame. Its name appeared in Bradshaw as Glassford Halt in 1933 but it was corrected to Glassford in 1937. The station closed to passengers on 1 October 1945 and closed to goods on 21 September 1953.

Preceding station	Disused railways	Following station
Quarter; Line and station closed	Hamilton and Strathaven Railway	Strathaven North (Old); Line and station closed
