= Sturmer, Essex =

Village in Essex, England

Coordinates: 52.067°N 0.478°E

Sturmer
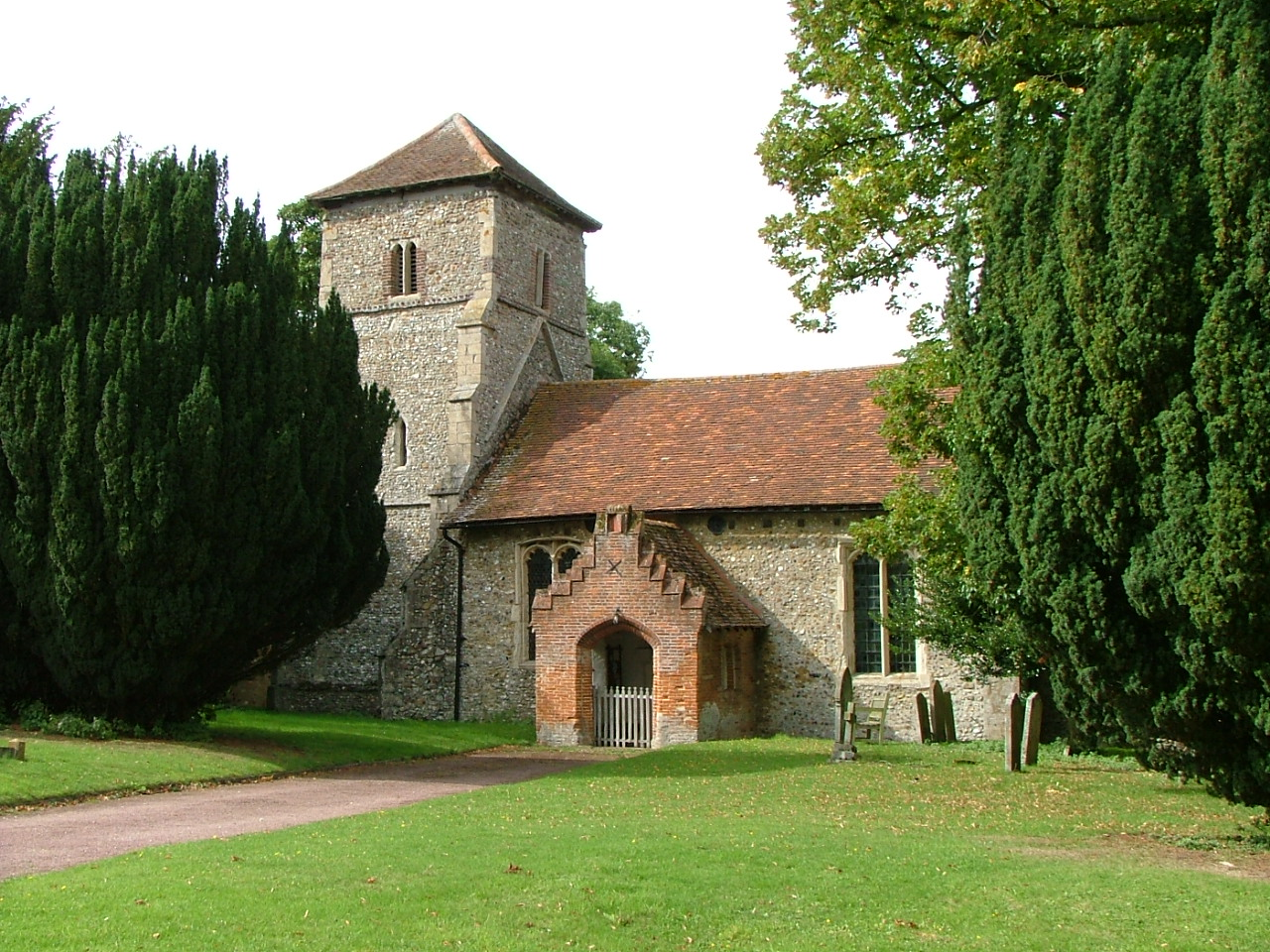
- St Mary's Church

- Location within Essex
- Population: 525 (Parish, 2021)
- OS grid reference: TL698439
- District: Braintree
- Shire county: Essex
- Region: East
- Country: England
- Sovereign state: United Kingdom
- Post town: Haverhill
- Postcode district: CB9
- Dialling code: 01440
- Police: Essex
- Fire: Essex
- Ambulance: East of England
- UK Parliament: Saffron Walden

Sturmer is a village and civil parish in the county of Essex, England, 2 miles (3 km) southeast of Haverhill and close to the county border with Suffolk. Its name was originally "Stour Mere", from the River Stour and is explicitly mentioned in the Domesday Book of 1086. A Tudor illustration of the mere from the summer of 1571 exists in the National Archives. The mere still exists today to the east of the village. The village also gives its name to the Sturmer Pippin apple which was raised by Ezekiel Dillistone from 1831, and grown in the orchards of the village. At the 2021 census the parish had a population of 525.

== Church ==
The church of St Mary's dates from the 9th century AD. According to a local legend it replaced an earlier woodsman's shrine. The nave is pre-Conquest, and the small blocked doorway in the north wall has a lintel embellished with a crude chequer pattern, which may well be Saxon work. The south doorway of the nave is also Saxon and has a Norman arch that was added in the 12th century when the present chancel took shape, although the east window was inserted c. 1200, at the beginning of the Early English period. The nave has a double hammer-beam roof. The tower was added in the 14th century, and most of the outer windows were inserted in the 15th century, in the Perpendicular style of architecture. The porch, of Tudor brick, is early 16th century.

== History ==
Sturmer has a tumulus to the West of the village, next to the easternmost roundabout of the Haverhill bypass. This would have been a burial ground for ancient Britons. It is dated Neolithic to late Bronze Age (2400 to 1500 BC), however, local legend has it that one of Boudicca's generals is buried here. In the Old English poem The Battle of Maldon, which describes the Battle of Maldon against the Vikings in AD 991, a loyal Anglo-Saxon warrior named Leofsunu or Leofsund says he is from Sturmer (lines 244–254). There is a modern slate memorial to him on the north wall of the nave of St Mary's Church that was dedicated by the Bishop of Colchester on 11 August 1991. Sturmer Hall is situated next to the church, is partially moated and evidence for this pre-Conquest moated manorial site and mill complex originates in the C10. It is currently a hotel, conference centre and wedding venue. Like most English villages, Sturmer once had industry of its own, including shops, maltings, farming, orchards for both apples and willow for basket making and cricket bats. Today, there is little of this local industry left. Sturmer is home to the 14th century Red Lion Inn and a garden centre, while the oldest cottage is Linnetts in Linnetts Lane that also dates from the 14th century. Most of the village area is still covered with worked arable land although it takes far fewer people to run an arable farm than it did in the 1800s. The village once had a railway station and hotel on Water Lane, but both are now private dwellings.

== Railway ==
The Stour Valley Railway connected Sturmer to Haverhill and Cambridge to the West and Sudbury and Colchester to the East, but was closed by the Beeching cuts which shut many branch lines. Sturmer railway station buildings and platform are, however, still visible from the road to Kedington, where the road crosses the River Stour. The Colne Valley and Halstead Railway, which ran from Haverhill to Halstead and on to Chappel and Wakes Colne, passed just to the south of Sturmer Hall. The railway was closed to all traffic by 1965 and the track removed in 1966, also as a result of the Beeching Axe.

== Heritage trail ==
Sturmer has a heritage trail called Sturmer Steps that details the history and environment of the village . The trail starts at Pocket Park in Water Lane, next to the old railway station, where an information board and leaflets are provided. Further information boards are located at the mere, outside the Village Hall and outside Sturmer Nurseries garden centre.

== Notable people ==
Olympic gold medalist Godfrey Rampling lived in Sturmer, where his daughter, the actress Charlotte Rampling, was born. A memorial plaque in the church, erected by parishioners, commemorates 'William Hicks, our Vicar who fought at Trafalgar.
