= High Blantyre railway station =

Disused railway station in Blantyre, South Lanarkshire

High Blantyre

General information
- Location: Blantyre, South Lanarkshire; Scotland
- Coordinates: 55.7847°N 4.1084°W
- Grid reference: NS678566
- Platforms: 2

Other information
- Status: Disused

History
- Opened: 2 February 1863; 162 years ago
- Closed: 1 October 1945; 80 years ago
- Original company: Hamilton and Strathaven Railway
- Pre-grouping: Caledonian Railway
- Post-grouping: London, Midland and Scottish Railway
Location

High Blantyre railway station served the town of Blantyre, South Lanarkshire, Scotland from 1863 to 1945 on the Hamilton and Strathaven Railway.

== History ==
The station was opened on 2 February 1863 on the Hamilton and Strathaven Railway. At the south end was the signal box and on both sides were sidings. The station closed on 1 October 1945.

Preceding station	Disused railways	Following station
Terminus	Hamilton and Strathaven Railway	Hamilton West; Line closed, station open
