= Old Warden Tunnel nature reserve =

Nature reserve in Bedfordshire, England

Coordinates: 52.0889°N 0.3762°W

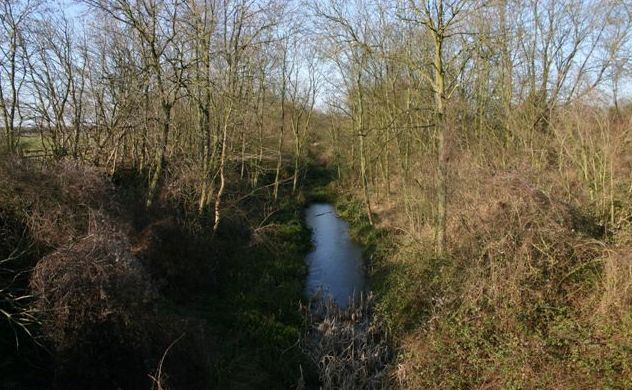

Old Warden Tunnel nature reserve is a 3.8-hectare (9.4-acre) nature reserve near Old Warden in Bedfordshire. It is managed by the Wildlife Trust for Bedfordshire, Cambridgeshire and Northamptonshire. The site is on top of a disused railway tunnel, Old Warden Tunnel.

The site has oak and ash woodland with mature blackthorn and hawthorn bushes, and a steep cutting with grassland and scrub. Flowers include dwarf thistle and pyramidal orchid, and the scrub provides nesting sites for birds.

There is access by a track from Southill Road.
