= Sutton Weaver railway station =

Former railway station in England

Sutton Weaver

General information
- Location: Sutton Weaver, Cheshire West and Chester; England
- Coordinates: 53.3144°N 2.6807°W
- Grid reference: SJ546799

Other information
- Status: Disused

History
- Original company: London and North Western Railway
- Pre-grouping: London and North Western Railway
- Post-grouping: London, Midland and Scottish Railway

Key dates
- 1 April 1869: Opened
- 30 November 1931: Closed to passengers
- 30 April 1942: Closed
Location

Sutton Weaver railway station was located in Sutton Weaver, Cheshire, England. The station was opened by the London and North Western Railway on 1 April 1869, closed to passengers on 30 November 1931 and closed on 30 April 1942.

Preceding station	Disused railways	Following station
Runcorn; Line and station open	London and North Western Railway; Crewe–Liverpool line	Acton Bridge; Line and station open
