= Swansea Riverside railway station =

Disused railway station in Swansea, Wales

Swansea Riverside

General information
- Location: Swansea, Glamorganshire; Wales
- Coordinates: 51.6207°N 3.9325°W
- Grid reference: SS663930

Other information
- Status: Disused

History
- Original company: Rhondda and Swansea Bay Railway
- Pre-grouping: Rhondda and Swansea Bay Railway
- Post-grouping: Great Western Railway

Key dates
- 7 May 1899: Opened as Swansea
- 1 July 1924: Name changed to Swansea Docks
- 17 September 1926: Name changed to Swansea Riverside
- 11 September 1933: Closed
Location

Swansea Riverside railway station served the city of Swansea, in the historical county of Glamorganshire, Wales, from 1899 to 1933 on the Rhondda and Swansea Bay Railway.

== History ==
The station was opened as Swansea on 7 May 1899 by the Rhondda and Swansea Bay Railway, although there is evidence of it being in use in 1895. Its name was changed to Swansea Docks on 1 July 1924 and changed again to Swansea Riverside on 17 September 1926. It closed on 11 September 1933.

Preceding station	Disused railways	Following station
Danygraig Halt; Line and station closed	Rhondda and Swansea Bay Railway	Terminus
