= Strathaven North railway station =

Former railway station in Scotland

Strathaven North
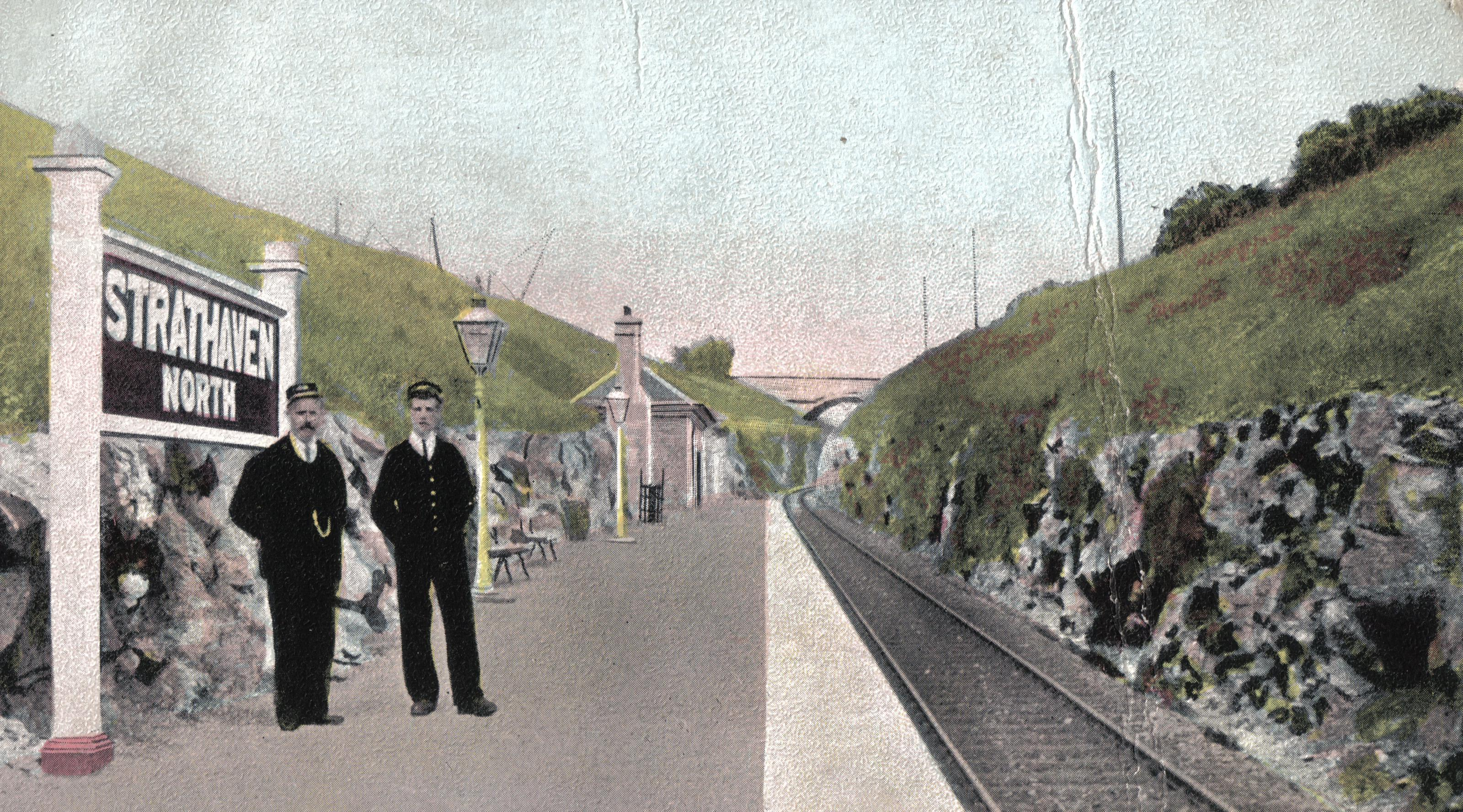

General information
- Location: South Lanarkshire; Scotland
- Coordinates: 55.6817°N 4.0535°W
- Platforms: 1

Other information
- Status: Disused

History
- Original company: Hamilton and Strathaven Railway
- Pre-grouping: Caledonian Railway
- Post-grouping: LMS

Key dates
- 1 October 1904: Opened as Strathaven
- 1 January 1917: closed
- 1 February 1919: opened
- 30 September 1945: Closed for passengers
- 21 September 1953: line closed completely
Location

Strathaven North railway station was a railway station in South Lanarkshire, Scotland.

== History ==
The line itself was primarily built by iron and coal masters such as William Dixon of the Govan Ironworks to serve the coalmines in the Hamilton, High Blantyre, Meikle Earnock and Quarter areas as well as the ironworks at Quarter. Strathaven North station was opened on the extension of the line from Flemington to Strathaven Central as part of the Mid Lanark Lines scheme to improve rail services in the area.

The first station at Strathaven was the terminus of the Hamilton and Strathaven Railway at Flemington, taken over by the Caledonian Railway; and replaced as a passenger station by Strathaven North railway station in 1904. Strathaven North opened in October 1904, closed temporarily during World War I; and closed permanently on 30 September 1945. The journey along the length of the line took around forty minutes and there were about six return journeys each day.

In 1923 Strathaven North became part of the London Midland and Scottish Railway at the Grouping, passing on to the Scottish Region of British Railways following the 1948 nationalisation of the railways. It was completely closed in 1953 by British Railways when goods services ceased .

Flemington, the Strathaven old station, became a goods station and closed in 1964; no sign now remains of its existence. Strathaven North was in a narrow railway cutting that has now been infilled and built on.

Preceding station	Historical railways	Following station
Glassford; Line closed; station closed	Caledonian Railway; Hamilton and Strathaven Railway	Strathaven Central; Line closed; station closed
