= Stannergate railway station =

Disused railway station in Stannergate, Dundee

Stannergate

General information
- Location: Stannergate, Dundee; Scotland
- Coordinates: 56.4682°N 2.9128°W
- Grid reference: NO438310
- Platforms: 2

Other information
- Status: Disused

History
- Original company: Dundee and Arbroath Railway
- Pre-grouping: Dundee and Arbroath Railway

Key dates
- 1 February 1901: Opened
- 1 May 1916: Closed
Location

Stannergate railway station served the suburb of Stannergate, Dundee, Scotland from 1901 to 1916 on the Dundee and Arbroath Railway.

== History ==
The station opened on 1 February 1901 by the Dundee and Arbroath Railway. To the south of the station was a small goods yard which had looped sidings. These served the nearby Tay Oilcake Works. The station closed to both passengers and goods traffic on 1 May 1916. The station buildings were demolished in the 1930s.

| Preceding station | Historical railways | Following station |
|---|---|---|
| West Ferry; Line open, station closed | Dundee and Arbroath Railway | Dundee East; Line open, station closed |
