= Stonehall and Lydden Halt railway station =

Disused railway station in Lydden, Kent

Stonehall and Lydden Halt

General information
- Location: Lydden, Kent; England
- Coordinates: 51.1644°N 1.2446°E
- Grid reference: TR269455

Other information
- Status: Disused

History
- Original company: London, Chatham and Dover Railway
- Pre-grouping: London, Chatham and Dover Railway
- Post-grouping: Southern Railway

Key dates
- June 1914: Opened
- 5 April 1954: Closed
Location

Stonehall and Lydden Halt railway station served the village of Lydden, Kent, England, from 1914 to 1954 on the Chatham Main Line.

== History ==
The station was opened to the public in June 1914 by the London, Chatham and Dover Railway, although it was used earlier by miners and workmen on 1 January 1914 and used for the Temple Ewell Parish Council meeting on 30 March 1914. It was known as Lydden Halt around this time. It closed on 5 April 1954, although it was used by staff going to Dover on 17 June 1957, when it was known as Stonehall.

Preceding station	Historical railways	Following station
Shepherds Well; Line and station open	London, Chatham and Dover Railway; Chatham Main Line	Kearsney; Line and station open
