= Sandall railway station =

Short-lived railway station in Kirk Sandall, South Yorkshire

Sandall

General information
- Location: Kirk Sandall, South Yorkshire; England
- Coordinates: 53.5659°N 1.082°W
- Grid reference: SE608080

Other information
- Status: Disused

History
- Original company: South Yorkshire Railway
- Pre-grouping: South Yorkshire Railway

Key dates
- April 1857: Opened
- September 1859: Closed
Location

Sandall railway station served the suburb of Kirk Sandall, South Yorkshire, England, from 1857 to 1859 on the Doncaster to Thorne section of the South Yorkshire Railway.

== History ==
The station was opened in April 1857 by the South Yorkshire Railway. It was only open on Saturdays. It was a very short-lived station, only being open for two years before closing in September 1859.

Preceding station	Disused railways	Following station
Terminus	South Yorkshire Railway	Barnby Dun; Line and station closed
