= Sturmer railway station =

Former railway station in England

Coordinates: 52.0681°N 0.4761°E

Sturmer
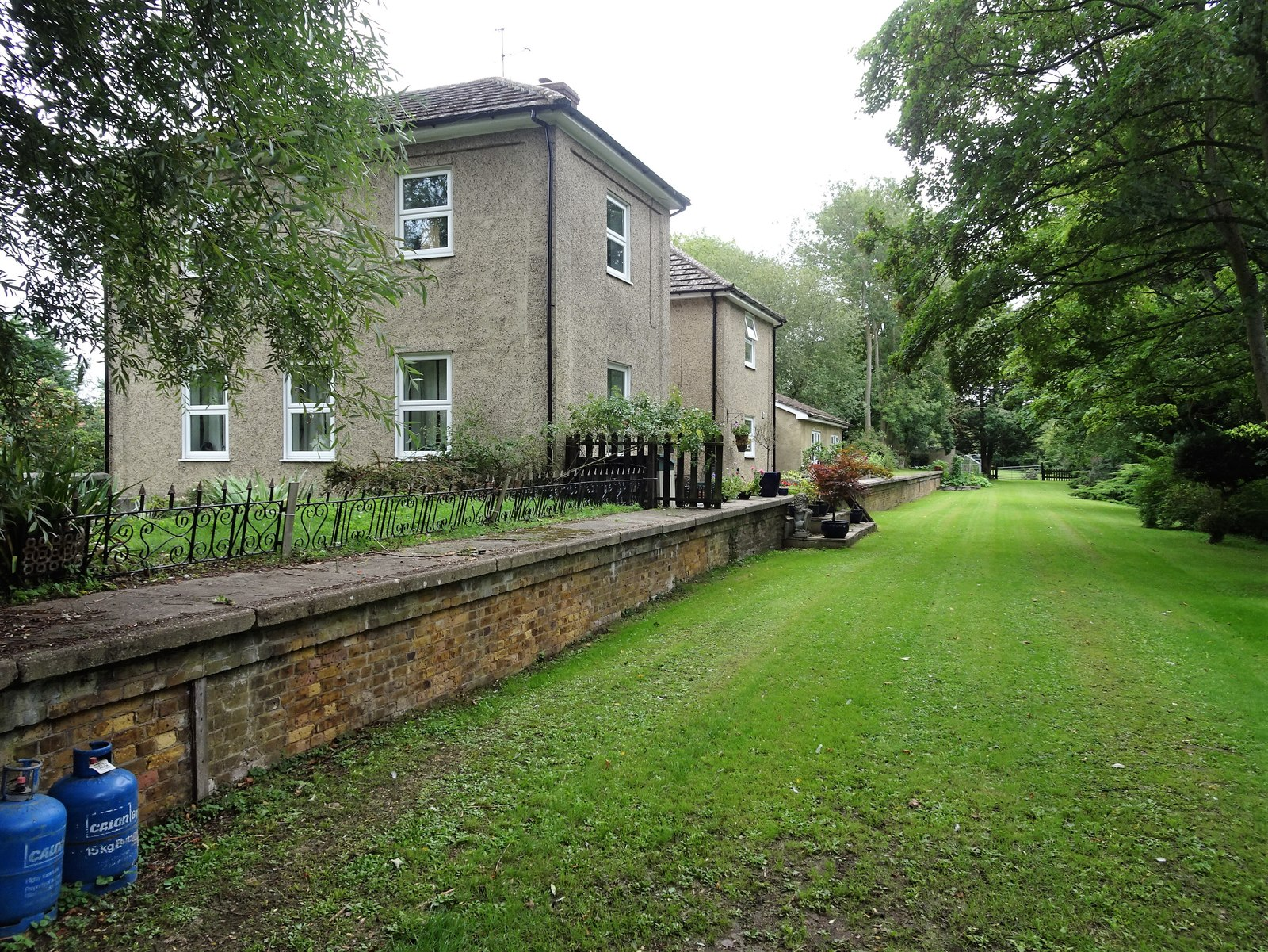
- The site of the station in 2020

General information
- Location: Sturmer, Braintree; England
- Platforms: 1

Other information
- Status: Disused

History
- Original company: Great Eastern Railway
- Post-grouping: London and North Eastern Railway

Key dates
- 9 August 1865: Opened
- 6 March 1967: Closed
Location

Sturmer railway station was a station that served the village of Sturmer, Essex, England. It opened in 1865 on the Stour Valley Railway between Sudbury and Cambridge.

The station and line closed in 1967 as part of the Beeching cuts.

The station building still stands today as a private residence.

Preceding station	Disused railways	Following station
Haverhill; Line and station closed	Great Eastern Railway; Stour Valley Railway	Stoke; Line and station closed
