= Springwell railway station =

Disused railway station in Springwell, Tyne and Wear

Springwell

General information
- Location: Springwell Village, Tyne and Wear; England
- Coordinates: 54.9549°N 1.5163°W
- Grid reference: NZ310623

Other information
- Status: Disused

History
- Original company: Brandling Junction Railway
- Pre-grouping: North Eastern Railway

Key dates
- August 1844: Opened
- 1 March 1872: Closed
Location

Springwell railway station served Springwell Village, Tyne and Wear, England, from 1844 to 1871 on the Durham Coast Line.

== History ==
The station opened in August 1844 by the Brandling Junction Railway. It was situated 300 yards west of Mill Lane bridge. It closed on 1 March 1872 when the line from Pelaw to South Shields opened. The signal box was still extant in the 1970s.

Preceding station	Historical railways	Following station
Pelaw; Line and station open	Durham Coast Line; Brandling Junction Railway	Brockley Whins; Line open, station closed
