= Spiersbridge railway station =

Short-lived railway station in Jenny Lind, Glasgow

Spiersbridge

General information
- Location: Jenny Lind, Lanarkshire; Scotland
- Coordinates: 55.8009°N 4.3229°W
- Grid reference: NS544588

Other information
- Status: Disused

History
- Original company: Glasgow, Barrhead and Neilston Direct Railway
- Pre-grouping: Glasgow, Barrhead and Neilston Direct Railway

Key dates
- 27 September 1848: Opened
- 1 May 1849: Closed
Location

Spiersbridge railway station, also known as Speirsbridge railway station, co-served the neighbourhood of Jenny Lind, historically in Lanarkshire, Scotland, from 1848 to 1849 on the Glasgow, Barrhead and Neilston Direct Railway.

== History ==
The station was opened on 27 September 1848 by the Glasgow, Barrhead and Neilston Direct Railway. It was a short-lived station, only being open for 7 months, before closing on 1 May 1849.

Preceding station	Historical railways	Following station
Kennishead; Line and station open	Glasgow, Barrhead and Neilston Direct Railway	Terminus
