= Stourton railway station =

Short-lived railway station in Stourton, Leeds

Stourton

General information
- Location: Stourton, City of Leeds; England
- Coordinates: 53.7672°N 1.5008°W
- Grid reference: SE330302

Other information
- Status: Disused

History
- Original company: East and West Yorkshire Union Railways
- Pre-grouping: East and West Yorkshire Union Railways

Key dates
- 4 January 1904: Opened
- 1 October 1904: Closed
Location

Stourton railway station served the area of Stourton, in the historic county of West Riding of Yorkshire, England, in 1904 on the East and West Yorkshire Union Railways.

== History ==
The station was opened on 4 January 1904 by the East and West Yorkshire Union Railways. It was a very short-lived station, only being open for under 9 months before closing along with the line on 1 October 1904.

Preceding station	Disused railways	Following station
Rothwell; Line and station closed	East and West Yorkshire Union Railways	Terminus
