= Stoke railway station (Suffolk) =

Defunct railway station in Suffolk, England

Coordinates: 52.0646°N 0.5403°E

Stoke
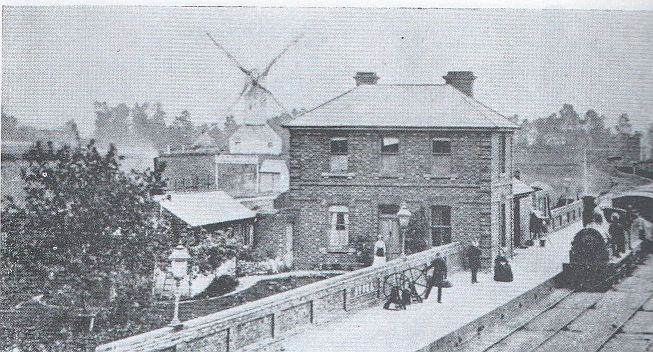
- Stoke by Clare station, 1865

General information
- Location: Stoke-by-Clare, West Suffolk; England
- Platforms: 1

Other information
- Status: Disused

History
- Original company: Great Eastern Railway
- Post-grouping: London and North Eastern Railway

Key dates
- 9 August 1865: Opened
- 6 March 1967: Closed
Location

Stoke railway station was a station that served the village of Stoke-by-Clare in Suffolk, England. It opened in 1865 on the Stour Valley Railway between Sudbury and Cambridge.

The station and line closed in 1967 as part of the Beeching cuts.

| Preceding station | Disused railways | Following station |
|---|---|---|
| Sturmer; Line and station closed | Great Eastern Railway; Stour Valley Railway | Clare; Line and station closed |
