= Strathaven Central railway station =

Former railway station in Scotland

Coordinates: 55.6743°N 4.0645°W

Strathaven Central railway station Strathaven
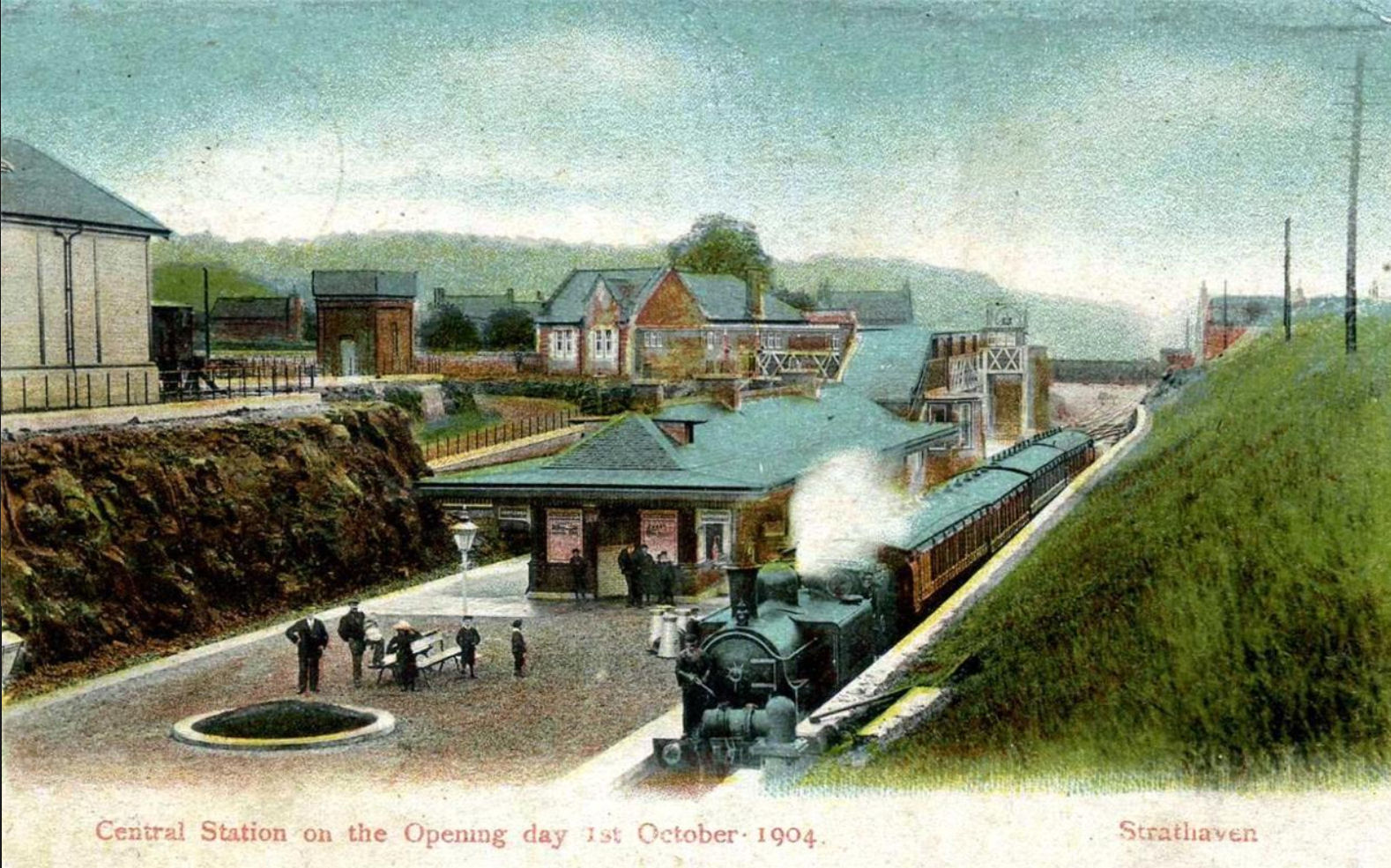
- The station in 1904

General information
- Location: Strathaven, South Lanarkshire; Scotland
- Platforms: 2 (island)

Other information
- Status: Disused

History
- Original company: Caledonian Railway

Key dates
- 1 October 1904: opened
- 7 December 1964: Closed to goods
- 4 October 1965: Closed to passengers
Location

Strathaven Central or Strathaven (NS 702 442) was a railway station on the Darvel and Strathaven Railway serving the town of Strathaven in South Lanarkshire, Scotland. The station opened as an extension of the line from Stonehouse and in 1904 was connected with the Hamilton and Strathaven Railway via a link to Strathaven North. It was renamed as 'Strathaven' a few months before closure.

== History ==
=== The routes ===
The line to Darvel

On 4 July 1905 the line from Strathaven opened, connecting to the Darvel Branch that ran from Kilmarnock, resulting in the line becoming a through route. Strathaven Central was the effective terminus of a line that was jointly worked between the Glasgow and South Western Railway (G&SWR) and the Caledonian Railway (CR). The CR owned the Loudounhill to Strathaven section and the G&SWR owned the section from Loudounhill to Darvel and beyond

Despite being a through route, no trains ran between Kilmarnock and Strathaven Central; instead, the two companies took it in turns to run the line between Darvel and Strathaven every six months. Stations were also located at Ryeland railway station, by Gilmourton. This was an island platform accessed from the overbridge that still shows where the access was blocked off from Drumclog and Loudounhill. The line was never successful and closed in 1939, although the Strathaven to Darvel section was used for broken wagons until the end of the war when they were either disposed of or repaired. The track was lifted in 1951.

The nominal junction between the Caledonian Railway and the Glasgow and South Western Railway was at the county boundary at Loudounhill Station. The closed line was used to store hundreds of damaged railway wagons that were awaiting repair.

The line had been intended as a through route between Lanarkshire and Ayrshire, however there was very little traffic along the route as the population in the area was very low. The other stations on the route were closed from September until November 1909 and then again from January 1917 until December 1922. As stated, the last train ran on 10 September 1939, however the official closing date was two weeks later.

Mid Lanark Lines

Strathaven Central station was also on the old Caledonian Railway line to Stonehouse that remained open until 4 October 1965. Larkhall railway station to Hamilton has been re-opened since 2005. The Stonehouse to Strathaven Central line opened on 1 July 1905. Strathaven Central to Stonehouse closed to freight on 7 December 1964 and to passengers on 4 October 1965.

The Hamilton and Strathaven line

The line from Hamilton via Strathaven North to Strathaven Central closed on 30 September 1945.

=== The station ===
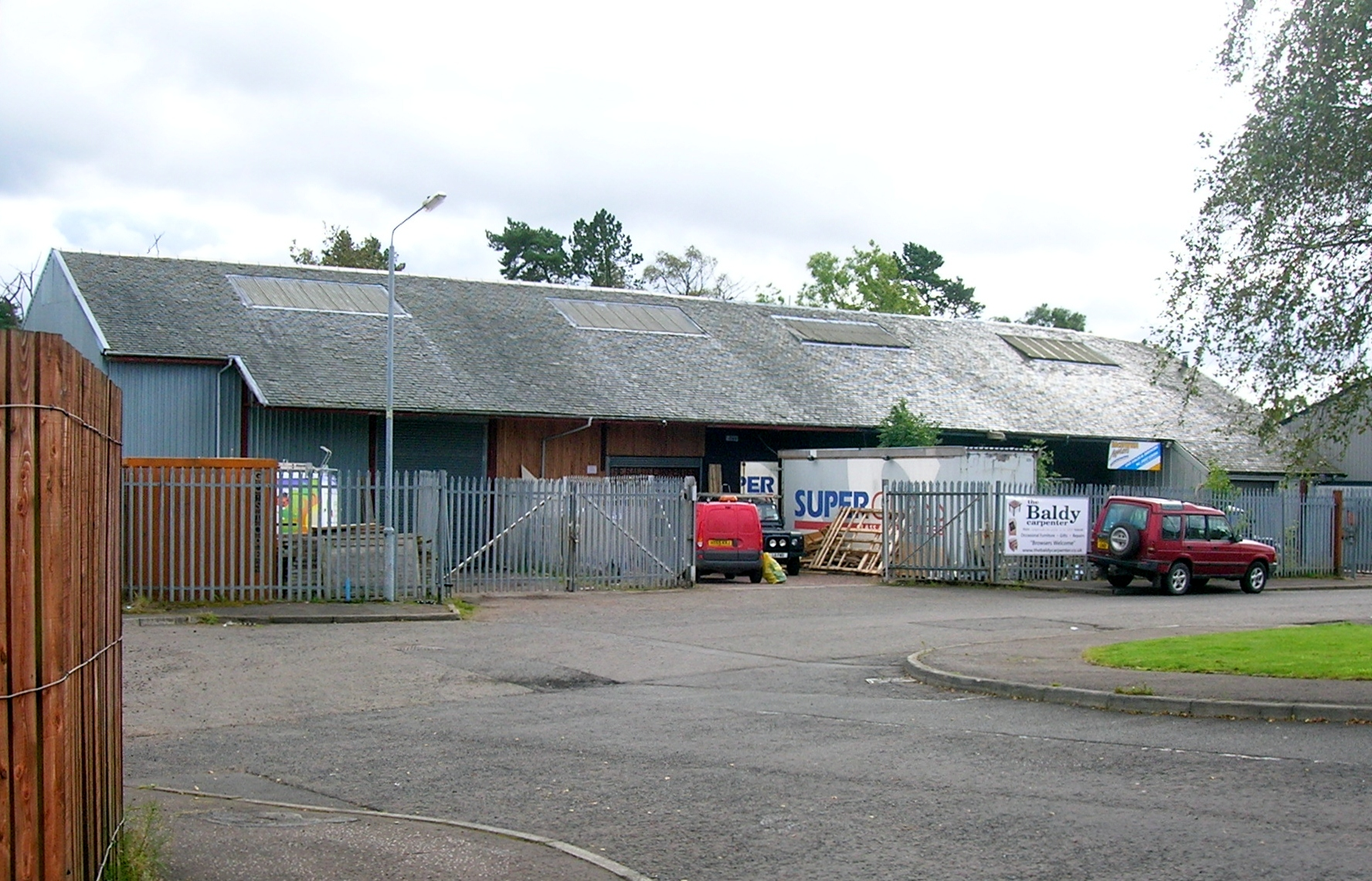
The old goods shed.

The station had an island platform, there were two booking offices at street level to the north of the station with footbridges down to the lower-level platform. Several sidings with a large goods shed (pictured above) were present. The goods shed burned in a blaze on the evening of 14 November 2014, the station master's house is still extant.
