= Stewarts Lane railway stations =

Former railway stations in England

Stewarts Lane
- Interactive map of Stewarts Lane

General information
- Location: Wandsworth
- Owner: West End of London and Crystal Palace Railway London, Chatham and Dover Railway

Key dates
- 28 May 1858: Opened (WELCPR)
- 1 December 1858: Closed (WELCPR)
- 1 May 1863: Opened (LCDR)
- 1 January 1867: Closed (LCDR)

Other information
- Coordinates: 51.4748°N 0.1423°W

Stewarts Lane (sometimes Stewart's Lane, with an apostrophe) was the name of two separate railway stations in Battersea, South London.

== First station ==
The first station, opened by the West End of London and Crystal Palace Railway, was on the line between Pimlico and New Wandsworth stations, located just south of the bridge under the LSWR lines. It was opened on 29 Mar 1858 and closed on 1 December 1858.

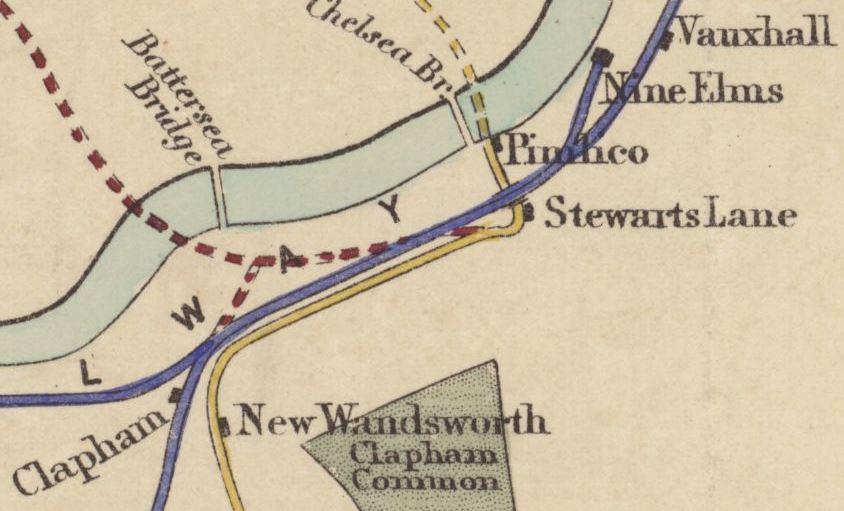
The 1858 Stewarts Lane station on the WELCPR (dashed lines are railways not yet built)

Preceding station	Historical railways	Following station
Pimlico	West End of London and Crystal Palace Railway (1858–1858)	New Wandsworth

== Second station ==
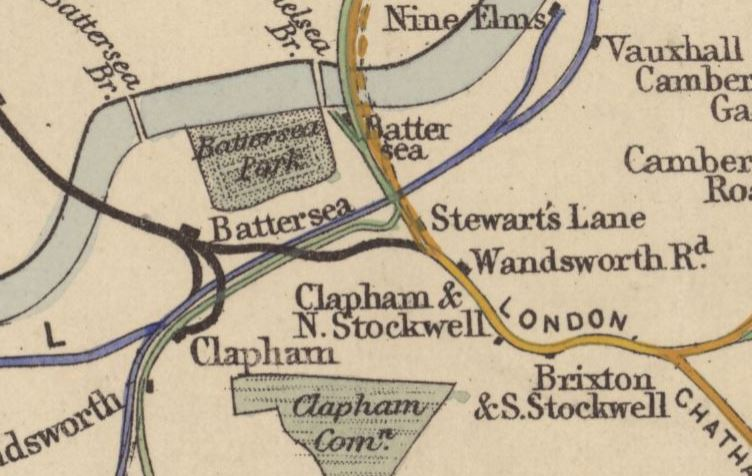
The 1863 Stewarts Lane station on the LCDR

The second station was later used by the London, Chatham and Dover Railway and located between Victoria and Wandsworth Road. This station was opened on 1 May 1863 and closed on 1 January 1867. It was located south of the previous station, at the end of Corunna Road (now Corunna Terrace). It had two staggered platforms; from the footbridge that joined them, the eastern platform reached north, and the western platform south.

Preceding station	Historical railways	Following station
London Victoria	London, Chatham and Dover Railway (1863–1867)	Wandsworth Road

== Coordinates ==
Point	Coordinates (Links to map resources)	OS Grid Ref	Notes
Stewarts Lane (WELCPR)	51.4763°N 0.1428°W	TQ29077689	1858–1858
Stewarts Lane (LCDR)	51.4748°N 0.1423°W	TQ29117672	1863–1867
