= Cardington railway station =

Former railway station in Bedfordshire, England

Coordinates: 52.113868°N 0.417797°W

Cardington
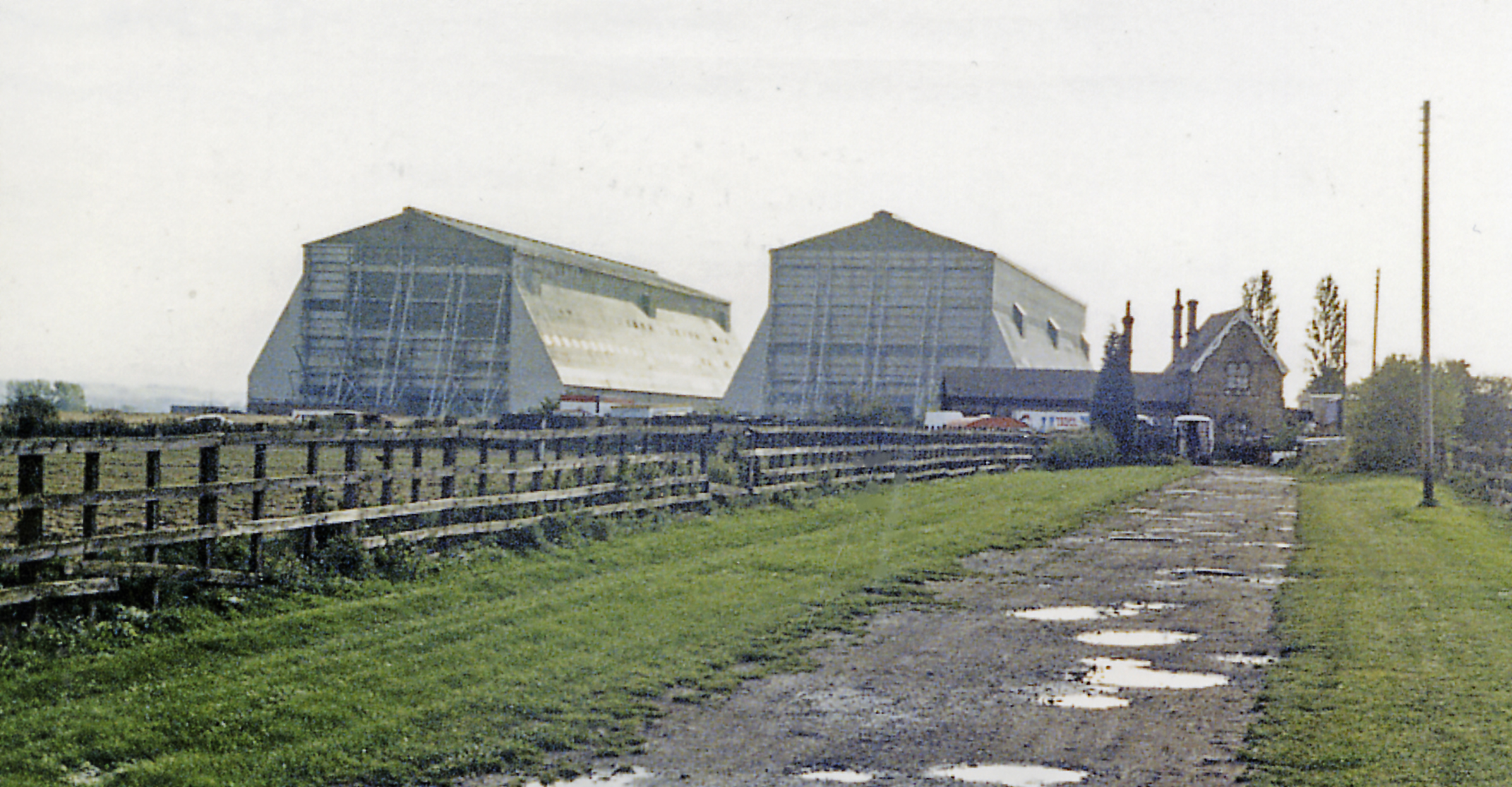
- Remains of the station dwarfed by the airship sheds

General information
- Location: Cardington, Borough of Bedford; England
- Grid reference: TL084473
- Platforms: 1

Other information
- Status: Disused

History
- Original company: Midland Railway
- Pre-grouping: Midland Railway
- Post-grouping: London, Midland and Scottish Railway; London Midland Region of British Railways

Key dates
- 8 May 1857: Opened
- 1 January 1962: Closed

Listed Building – Grade II
- Feature: Cardington Railway Station
- Designated: 17 May 1984
- Reference no.: 1114153
Location

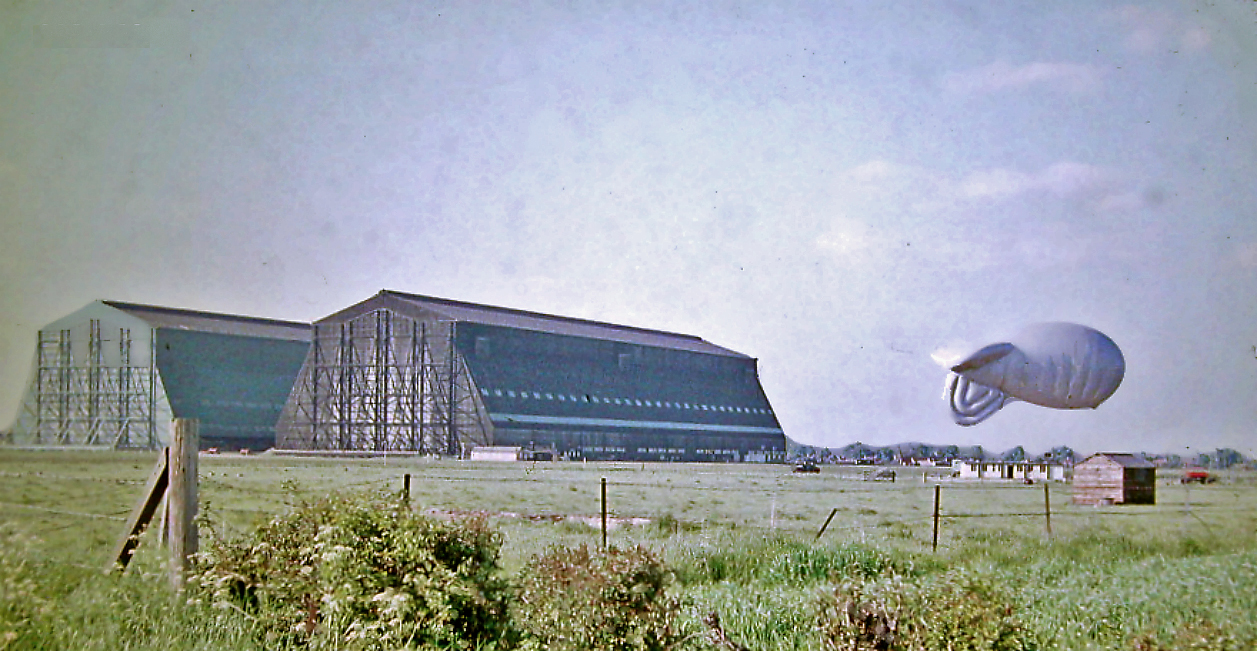
Cardington airship hangars in 1962

Cardington was a railway station on the Bedford to Hitchin Line which served the village of Cardington in Bedfordshire, England. Opened in 1857, it gave more than a century of service before closing in 1962.

== History ==
Cardington station was opened by the Midland Railway in 1857 as part of its main line from Leicester to Hitchin, built to allow it a direct route to London without using rival London and Birmingham Railway metals but having running powers over the Great Northern main line from Hitchin to King's Cross. However, when the Midland Railway later built its own route from Bedford to London St Pancras, the section between Bedford and Hitchin was demoted to a mere branch line, over which passenger traffic was minimal and services were reduced to a shuttle by 1880.

The establishment of an airship factory in Cardington by Short Brothers during the First World War increased passenger and freight traffic through the station. This continued after the war when the coalition government approved a project to build two large airships, the R100 and R101; the R101 was built at Cardington, the R100 in Yorkshire. This required the construction of two large sheds at what was then known as the Royal Airship Works. The inter-war years saw a decline in traffic with the introduction of buses between Bedford and Hitchin. Traffic picked up again during the Second World War when the site became RAF Cardington particularly when troop specials were run to enable conscripts to travel forward to their basic training camps. The introduction of railbuses after the war did little to improve traffic, and the line closed in 1962.

=== Stationmasters ===
- John Antill 1857 - 1863
- A Spriggs from 1863
- William Wood ca. 1870
- Charles Pryor until 1872
- G. Hartshorn 1872 - 1873 (formerly station master at Water Orton)
- William Thomas Davey 1873 - 1874
- Samuel Watkins 1874 - 1888
- John Gammons from 1888 - ca. 1914
- John William Cornell (afterwards station master at Teversall)
- Mr. Adkins until 1931 (afterwards station master at Daventry)
- F. Aldridge ca. 1935

Preceding station	Disused railways	Following station
Bedford Midland	London, Midland and Scottish Railway; Bedford to Hitchin Line	Cardington Workmen's; Platform

== Present day ==
The station building remains in private ownership and is a listed building. The owner has affixed the former distant signal on the exterior of the property.
