= Bedford–Hitchin line =

Coordinates: 52.064°N 0.323°W

The Bedford–Hitchin line was a branch of the Midland Railway which served stations at Cardington, Southill, Shefford and Henlow Camp in Bedfordshire, England. It opened in 1857, but was largely made redundant as a through-route to London by the extension of the Midland Main Line to St Pancras. The last passenger train ran in December 1961, and goods trains lasted to 1964.

== History ==
=== Construction ===
The merger of the Midland Counties Railway, the North Midland Railway, and the Birmingham and Derby Junction Railway in 1844 created the Midland Railway which, having no route to London of its own, relied on the London & Birmingham Railway to feed traffic through to the capital. Delays in processing traffic led to a proposal in 1847 for a line connecting Leicester with Hitchin. Although authorisation for the line was obtained, the scheme was postponed until 1852 due to unfavourable economic conditions. Thomas Brassey was principal contractor on the line which included the 882-yard Warden Tunnel. The line was officially opened on 7 May 1857 and an initial service to Hitchin of four trains each way on weekdays, with freight services beginning some six months later. Through services to London were introduced from February 1858, once the Midland Railway had reached agreement with the Great Northern Railway (GNR) for the use of its rails between Hitchin and King's Cross.

=== Decline and closure ===
In 1862, the GNR formally evicted the Midland from the overcrowded sidings at King's Cross, which prompted it to seek an alternative through route to London of its own. The result was the extension of the Midland Main Line from Bedford to St. Pancras, which had the effect of reducing the Bedford to Hitchin line to rural branch status. Having been built as a trunk route, the line was little prepared to eke out an existence carrying passenger traffic between the rural communities along the route. Passenger services were subsequently reduced to a shuttle between Bedford and Hitchin, and the track was singled in 1911 except between Shefford and Southill.

Traffic briefly increased during the First and Second World Wars, with RAF camps being set up at Cardington and Henlow. However, competition from local bus services had an effect and by the 1950s trains comprised one carriage only; not even the introduction of 3 railbuses in 1958 could halt the decline. The last passenger train departed from Hitchin at 19:00 on Saturday 30 December 1961, and goods services were withdrawn in 1964, the same year that scenes for the film Those Magnificent Men in Their Flying Machines were shot near Warden Tunnel, using an ex-Highland Railway locomotive and set of coaches disguised as a train of France's Chemin de Fer du Nord. On 5 Oct 1963 The Wandering 1500 Railtour London Broad Street via Hitchin, Bedford and Northampton to Stratford on Avon with B12 4-6-0 61572 was the very last passenger train to use the branch, returning via the Leamington Spa to Rugby branch line and the LNWR main line back to Broad Street.

== The line today ==
The station building at Southill has been converted into a private residence, with the platform area, sidings and cattle pen now incorporated into the garden. At Old Warden, the tunnel remains in decent condition, although blocked off, and is now surrounded by a nature reserve. The site of Henlow Camp station has been obliterated by redevelopment, and Shefford Industrial Park also covers part of the trackbed.

== Bibliography ==
- Davies, R.; Grant, M.D. (1984). Forgotten Railways: Chilterns and Cotswolds. Newton Abbot, Devon: David St John Thomas. ISBN 0-946537-07-0.
- Oppitz, Leslie (2000). Lost Railways of the Chilterns (Lost Railways Series). Newbury, Berkshire: Countryside Books. ISBN 978-1-85306-643-6.
