= Hamilton and Strathaven Railway =

Railway in Lanarkshire, Scotland

Overview
- Locale: Scotland
- Dates of operation: 6 August 1860; 165 years ago–25 July 1864; 161 years ago
- Successor: Caledonian Railway

Technical
- Track gauge: 4 ft 8 1/2 in (1,435 mm)
- Length: 10 1/4 miles (16.5 km)

The Hamilton and Strathaven Railway was a historic railway in Scotland. It ran from a junction with the Hamilton Branch of the Caledonian Railway to a terminus at Strathaven. The railway was worked from the start by the Caledonian Railway, who absorbed the railway company in 1864.

== History ==
Hamilton and Strathaven Railway Act 1857
- Act of Parliament
- Parliament of the United Kingdom
- Long title: An Act for making a Railway from near Hamilton to near Strathaven in the County of Lanark, to be called "The Hamilton and Strathaven Railway;" and for other Purposes.
- Citation: 20 & 21 Vict. c. cxxviii

Dates
- Royal assent: 10 August 1857

Text of statute as originally enacted

The railway was planned by William Smith Dixon, an Ironmaster.

Its construction was authorised by the Hamilton and Strathaven Railway Act 1857 (20 & 21 Vict. c. cxxviii) on 10 August 1857; and it was opened on 9 August 1860, from Hamilton to Quarter, for the carriage of goods. It opened fully on 2 February 1863, between Hamilton and Strathaven, for goods and passengers.

Caledonian and Hamilton and Strathaven Railway Amalgamation Act 1864
- Act of Parliament
- Parliament of the United Kingdom
- Long title: An Act to authorize the Amalgamation of the Hamilton and Strathaven Railway Company with the Caledonian Railway Company; and for other Purposes.
- Citation: 27 & 28 Vict. c. ccl

Dates
- Royal assent: 25 July 1864

Text of statute as originally enacted

It was taken over by the Caledonian Railway, which was authorised to do so by the Caledonian and Hamilton and Strathaven Railway Amalgamation Act 1864 (27 & 28 Vict. c. ccl) of 25 July 1864.

== Connections to other lines ==
- Hamilton Branch of the Caledonian Railway at Haughhead Junction.
- Busby Railway (now the East Kilbride–Glasgow Central line) of the Caledonian Railway at Hunthill Junction.
- Mid Lanark Lines of the Caledonian Railway at Strathaven Central
- Darvel and Strathaven Railway at Strathaven Central
