= List of closed railway stations in Great Britain: W–Z =

The list of closed railway stations in Great Britain includes the following: Year of closure is given if known. Stations reopened as heritage railways continue to be included in this list and some have been linked. Some stations have been reopened to passenger traffic. Some lines remain in use for freight and mineral traffic.

== W ==
=== Wa ===
Station (Town, unless in station name)	Rail company	Year closed
Wadborough	Midland Railway	1965
Waddesdon	Metropolitan and Great Central Joint Railway	1936
Waddesdon Road	Metropolitan Railway	1935
Waddington	GNR	1962
Waddon Marsh	Southern Railway	1997
Wadebridge	London and South Western Railway	1967
Wadsley Bridge	Sheffield, Ashton-under-Lyne and Manchester Railway	1959 regular services, 1996 special trains
Waenavon	London and North Western Railway	1941
Wainfelin Halt	GWR	1941
Wainhill Crossing Halt	GWR	1957
Wakerley and Barrowden	London and North Western Railway	1966
Walberswick	Southwold Railway	1929
Walcot	Shrewsbury and Wellington Joint Railway	1964
Waleswood	Great Central Railway	1955
Walford Halt	GWR	1959
Walkden Low Level	London and North Western Railway	1954
Walker	North Eastern Railway	1973
Walkerburn	North British Railway	1962
Walkeringham	Great Northern and Great Eastern Joint Railway	1959
Wall	North British Railway	1955
Wall Grange and Longsdon	North Staffordshire Railway	1956
Wallace Nick	North British Railway	1851
Wallingfen	Hull and Barnsley Railway	1955
Wallingford	GWR	1959
Wallyford	North British Railway	1867
Walpole	Midland and Great Northern Joint Railway	1959
Walsall Wood	Midland Railway	1930
Walsden	Lancashire and Yorkshire Railway	1961 reopened 1990
Walsingham	Great Eastern Railway	1964
Walsoken	Eastern Counties Railway	1851
Waltham	GNR	1961
Waltham-on-the-Wolds	GNR	1907/1964
Walton & Anfield	London and North Western Railway	1948
Walton (Cambridgeshire)	Midland Railway	1953
Walton (Yorkshire) formerly Sandal and Walton	Midland Railway	1961
Walton Junction	Birkenhead, Lancs and Cheshire Junction Railway	1857
Walton Park	Weston, Clevedon and Portishead Railway	1940
Walton in Gordano	Weston, Clevedon and Portishead Railway	1940
Walton on the Hill	Cheshire Lines Committee	1918
Walworth Road	London, Chatham and Dover Railway	1916
Wamphray	Caledonian Railway	1960
Wandsworth Road	South Eastern and Chatham Railway	1916
Wanlockhead	Caledonian Railway	1939
Wansford	L&NWR	1957
Wansford Road	GNR	1929
Wanstrow	GWR	1963
Wantage	Wantage Tramway	1925
Wantage Road	GWR	1964
Wappenham	Stratford-upon-Avon and Midland Junction Railway	1951
Wapping Dock	Liverpool Overhead Railway	1956
Warboys	Great Northern and Great Eastern Joint Railway	1930
Warbreck	Cheshire Lines Committee	1960
Warcop	North Eastern Railway	1962
Warden	Newcastle and Carlisle Railway	1837
Wardhouse	Great North of Scotland Railway	1961
Wardleworth	Lancashire and Yorkshire Railway	1947
Wark	North British Railway	1956
Warkworth	North Eastern Railway	1958
Warmley	Midland Railway	1966
Warren (Merseyside)	Wirral Railway	1915
Warren Halt (Folkestone)	SE&CR	1939
Warren Halt (RHDR)	Romney, Hythe and Dymchurch Railway	1946 reopened 2009
Warrenby Halt	North Eastern Railway	1978
Warrington Arpley	St. Helens Railway	1958
Warrington Dallam Lane	Warrington and Newton Railway	1837
Warrington Wilderspool	London and North Western Railway	1854; 1871
Warsop	LD&ECR	1955
Warthill	York and North Midland Railway	1959
Warthill	Sand Hutton Light Railway	1930
Wartle	Great North of Scotland Railway	1951
Warwick Road (Warwickshire)	East and West Junction Railway	1873
Washford (WSMR)	West Somerset Mineral Railway	1898
Washingborough	GNR	1940
Washington (Tayside)	Scottish Midland Junction Railway	1847
Washington (Tyne and Wear)	North Eastern Railway	1963
Waskerley	North Eastern Railway	1859
Wassand	North Eastern Railway	1953
Watchet (WSMR)	West Somerset Mineral Railway	1898
Watchingwell Halt (Isle of Wight)	Freshwater, Yarmouth and Newport Railway	1953
Water Stratford Halt	British Railways	1961
Waterfall (Isle of Man)	Foxdale Railway	1940
Waterfoot	Lancashire and Yorkshire Railway	1966
Watergate Halt	North Devon and Cornwall Junction Light Railway	1965
Waterhouses, Co.Durham	North Eastern Railway	1951
Waterhouses (Staffordshire)	North Staffordshire Railway	1935
Waterloo (Aberdeen)	Great North of Scotland Railway	1867
Waterloo Halt	Brecon and Merthyr Tydfil Junction Railway	1956
Waterloo Road	North Staffordshire Railway	1943
Waterside	Glasgow and South Western Railway	1964
Watford (L&BR)	London and Birmingham Railway	1858
Watford Stadium	British Railways	1996
Watford West	L&NWR	1996
Wath	Hull and Barnsley Railway	1929
Wath Central	Great Central Railway	1959
Wath North	Midland Railway	1968
Wath-in-Nidderdale	Nidd Valley Light Railway	1930
Watlington (Oxfordshire)	GWR	1957
Watnall	Midland Railway	1917
Watson's Crossing Halt	Lancashire and Yorkshire Railway	1929
Watten	Sutherland and Caithness Railway	1960
Watton (Brecon)	Brecon and Merthyr Tydfil Junction Railway	1871
Watton (Norfolk)	Great Eastern Railway	1964
Wattstown Platform	Taff Vale Railway	1920
Waunfawr	North Wales Narrow Gauge Railways	1936 reopened 2000
Waverton	London and North Western Railway	1959
Wavertree	London and North Western Railway	1958
Wavertree Lane	Liverpool and Manchester Railway	1836

=== We ===
Station (Town, unless in station name)	Rail company	Year closed
Wear Valley Junction	North Eastern Railway	1935
Wearhead	North Eastern Railway	1953
Wearmouth	York, Newcastle and Berwick Railway	1848
Weaste	London and North Western Railway	1942
Weaverthorpe	North Eastern Railway	1930
Wednesbury Central	GWR	1972
Wednesbury Town	London and North Western Railway	1964
Wednesfield	Midland Railway	1931
Wednesfield Heath	London and North Western Railway	1873
Weedon	London and North Western Railway	1958
Weelsby Road Halt	GNR	1952
Weeton (Lancashire)	Preston and Wyre Railway	1843
Welbury	North Eastern Railway	1954
Welford and Kilworth	London and North Western Railway	1966
Welford Park	GWR	1960
Wellfield	North Eastern Railway	1952
Wellingborough London Road	London and North Western Railway	1964
Wellington (Somerset)	GWR	1964
Wellow	Somerset and Dorset Joint Railway	1966
Wells East Somerset	East Somerset Railway	1878
Wells (Priory Road)	Somerset and Dorset Joint Railway	1951
Wells (Tucker Street)	GWR	1963
Wells-next-the-Sea	Great Eastern Railway	1964
Welnetham	Great Eastern Railway	1961
Welsh Harp	Midland Railway	1903
Welsh Hook Halt	GWR	1964
Welshampton	Cambrian Railways	1965
Welshpool	Welshpool and Llanfair Light Railway	1931
Welshpool Seven Stars Halt	Welshpool and Llanfair Light Railway	1931
Welsh's Crossing Halt	London, Midland and Scottish Railway	1944
Welton (Northampton)	London and North Western Railway	1958
Welwyn Junction	GNR	1860
Wembley Stadium	London and North Eastern Railway	1969
Wemyss Castle	North British Railway	1955
Wendlebury Halt	London and North Western Railway	1926
Wendling	Great Eastern Railway	1968
Wenhaston	Southwold Railway	1929
Wensley	North Eastern Railway	1954
Wentworth and Hoyland Common	Midland Railway	1959
Wenvoe	Barry Railway	1962
Wern Las	Shropshire and Montgomeryshire Railway	1933
West Auckland	NER	1962
West Bay (Bridport)	GWR	1930
West Brompton	West London Extension Joint Railway	1940 reopened 1999
West Bromwich	GWR	1972
West Cliff (Whitby)	North Eastern Railway	1961
West Cornforth	North Eastern Railway	1952
West Cross	Swansea and Mumbles Railway	1960
West Cults	Great North of Scotland Railway	1937
West Derby (Liverpool)	Cheshire Lines Committee	1960
West Exe Halt	GWR	1963
West Ferry	Dundee and Arbroath Railway	1967
West Gosforth	North Eastern Railway	1929
West Green	Great Eastern Railway	1963
West Grinstead	London, Brighton and South Coast Railway	1966
West Hallam	GNR	1964
West Halton	Great Central Railway	1925
West Hartlepool	North Eastern Railway	1880
West Helmsdale	Highland Railway	1871
West Hoathly	London, Brighton and South Coast Railway	1958
West House	Midland Railway	1865
West India Docks	Great Eastern Railway	1926
West Kirby	Birkenhead Joint Railway	1956
West Leigh	London and North Western Railway	1954
West Leigh and Bedford	Great Central Railway	1964
West London Junction	West London Railway	1844
West London Junction	London and Birmingham Railway	1866
West Lynn	Lynn and Sutton Bridge Railway	1886
West Meon	London and South Western Railway	1955
West Mill	Great Eastern Railway	1964
West Moors	London and South Western Railway	1964
West Pennard	Somerset and Dorset Joint Railway	1966
West Rounton Gates	North Eastern Railway	1939
West Stanley	North Eastern Railway	1955
West Timperley	Cheshire Lines Committee	1964
West Tinsley	Great Central Railway	1939
West Vale	Lancashire and Yorkshire Railway	1929
West Wemyss	North British Railway	1949
West Wycombe	Great Western and Great Central Joint Railway	1958
Westbrook	Golden Valley Railway	1941
Westbury (Shropshire)	Shrewsbury and Welshpool Railway	1960
Westbury-on-Severn Halt	GWR	1959
Westcott	Metropolitan Railway	1935
Westcott Range Halt	SE&CR	1928
Westcraigs	North British Railway	1956 reopened in 2010 as Blackridge
Westerham	South Eastern Railway (UK)	1961
Westfield (NBR)	North British Railway	1930
Westgate-in-Weardale	North Eastern Railway	1953
Westham Halt	Weymouth and Portland Railway	1952
Westhead Halt	Lancashire and Yorkshire Railway	1951
Westhouses and Blackwell	Midland Railway	1967
Westmoor Flag	Midland Railway	?- prior to 1962
Westoe Lane (South Shields)	South Shields, Marsden and Whitburn Colliery Railway	1953
Weston and Ingestre	North Staffordshire Railway	1947
Weston (Bath)	Midland Railway	1953
Weston (Lincolnshire)	Midland and Great Northern Joint Railway	1959
Weston Junction	GWR	1884
Weston Mill Halt	London and South Western Railway	1921
Weston Rhyn	GWR	1960
Weston-on-Trent	Midland Railway	1930
Weston-sub-Edge Halt	Great Western Railway	1960
Weston-super-Mare (Ashcombe Road)	Weston, Clevedon and Portishead Railway	1940
Weston-super-Mare, Locking Road	Great Western Railway	1964
Weston-under-Penyard Halt	GWR	1964
Westward Ho!	Bideford, Westward Ho! and Appledore Railway	1917
Westwood	Great Central Railway	1876; 1940
Westwood Halt	GWR	1951
Wetherby (Linton Road)	North Eastern Railway	1964
Wetherby Racecourse	LNER	1959
Wetherby (York Road)	York and North Midland Railway	1902
Wetton Mill	North Staffordshire Railway	1934
Wetwang	North Eastern Railway	1950
Weybourne	Midland and Great Northern Joint Railway	1964– Reopened by North Norfolk Rly 1975
Weyhill	Midland and South Western Junction Railway	1961
Weymouth Quay	Great Western Railway	Regular services until 1987; Used by specials until 1999

=== Wh ===
Station (Town, unless in station name)	Rail company	Year closed
Whalley	Lancashire and Yorkshire Railway	1962 reopened 1994
Whaplode	Midland and Great Northern Joint Railway	1959
Wharram	North Eastern Railway	1950
Whauphill	Portpatrick and Wigtownshire Joint Railway	1950
Wheathampstead	Great Northern Railway	1965
Wheatley	GWR	1963
Wheelock and Sandbach	North Staffordshire Railway	1930
Wheldrake	Derwent Valley Light Railway	1926
Whelley	Lancashire Union Railway	1872
Wherwell	London and South Western Railway	1931
Whetstone	Great Central Railway	1963
Whieldon Road Halt	North Staffordshire Railway	1918
Whifflet	North British Railway	1930
Whifflet Lower	Caledonian Railway	1962
Whifflet Upper	Caledonian Railway	1964
Whimsey Halt	GWR	1930
Whippingham	Isle of Wight Central Railway	1953
Whipton Bridge Halt	London and South Western Railway	1923
Whissendine	Midland Railway	1955
Whistlefield	North British Railway	1964
Whitacre	Midland Railway	1968
Whitbeck Crossing	Whitehaven and Furness Junction Railway	1857
Whitburn	Edinburgh and Glasgow Railway	1930
Whitburn Colliery	South Shields, Marsden and Whitburn Colliery Railway	1953
Whitby West Cliff	Whitby, Redcar and Middlesbrough Union Railway	1961
Whitchurch Down Platform	GWR	1962
Whitchurch Halt (Somerset)	GWR	1959
Whitchurch Town (Hampshire)	GWR	1960
White Bear	Lancashire and Yorkshire Railway & Lancashire Union Railway joint	1960
White City	Hammersmith and City Railway	1959
White Colne	Colne Valley and Halstead Railway	1962
White Cross (Warrington)	STHR	1854
White Hart Halt	GWR	1952
White Moss Level Crossing Halt	Lancashire and Yorkshire Railway	1951
White Sike Cottages	Sand Hutton Light Railway	1930
White Sike Junction	Sand Hutton Light Railway	1930
Whiteborough	Midland Railway	1926
Whitebrook Halt	GWR	1959
Whitecroft	Severn and Wye Railway	1929 reopened 2012
Whitedale	NER	1964
Whitegate	Cheshire Lines Committee	1931
Whitehall Halt	GWR	1963
Whitehaven (Preston Street)	Whitehaven and Furness Junction Railway	1854
Whitehouse	Great North of Scotland Railway	1950
Whitehurst Halt	GWR	1960
Whiteinch Riverside	Caledonian Railway	1964
Whiteinch Victoria Park	North British Railway	1951
Whitemill	Llanelly Railway	1870
Whiterigg	North British Railway	1930
Whithorn	Portpatrick and Wigtownshire Joint Railway	1950
Whitland	Pembroke and Tenby Railway	1869
Whitley	Colne Valley and Halstead Railway	1863
Whitlingham	Great Eastern Railway	1955
Whitmore	London and North Western Railway	1952
Whitney-on-Wye	Midland Railway	1962
Whitrigg	Caledonian Railway	1921
Whitstable Harbour	Canterbury and Whitstable Railway	1931
Whitstable Town	London, Chatham and Dover Railway	1915
Whitstone and Bridgerule	London and South Western Railway	1966
Whittingham	North Eastern Railway	1930
Whittington (Derbyshire)	Midland Railway	1873; 1952
Whittington High Level	Cambrian Railways	1960
Whittington Low Level	GWR	1960
Whittlestone Head	Lancashire and Yorkshire Railway	1848
Whitton (Lincolnshire)	Great Central Railway	1925
Whitwell and Reepham (Norfolk)	Midland and Great Northern Joint Railway	1959
Whitwell (Derbyshire)	Midland Railway	1964 reopened 1998
Whitwell Halt (Isle of Wight)	Isle of Wight Central Railway	1952
Whitwick	London and North Western Railway	1931
Whitworth	Lancashire and Yorkshire Railway	1947

=== Wi ===
Station (Town, unless in station name)	Rail company	Year closed
Wichnor Junction	London and North Western Railway	1877
Wick St Lawrence	Weston, Clevedon and Portishead Railway	1940
Wickenby	Great Central Railway	1965
Wicker	Sheffield and Rotherham Railway	1870
Wickham (Hants)	London and South Western Railway	1955
Wickham Bishops	Great Eastern Railway	1964
Wickwar	Midland Railway	1965
Widford	Great Eastern Railway	1964
Widmerpool	Midland Railway	1949
Widnes Central	Great Central and Midland Joint Railway	1964
Widnes South	London and North Western Railway	1962
Wigan Central	Great Central Railway	1964
Wigan Darlington Street	Wigan Junction Railways	1892
Wighton Halt	London and North Eastern Railway	1964 (Trackbed now used by Wells and Walsingham Light Railway
Wigston Glen Parva	London & North Western Railway	1968
Wigston Magna	Midland Railway	1968
Wigston South	Midland Railway	1962
Wigtown	Portpatrick and Wigtownshire Joint Railway	1950
Wilbraham Road	Great Central Railway	1958
Wilburton	Great Eastern Railway	1931
Wilby	Mid-Suffolk Light Railway	1952
Willaston	London and North Western Railway	1954
Willenhall Bilston Street	Grand Junction Railway	1965 reopened 2026
Willenhall Stafford Street	Midland Railway	1931
Willerby and Kirk Ella	Hull and Barnsley Railway	1955
Willersey Halt	GWR	1960
Willesden	London and Birmingham Railway	1866
Willesden Junction (Main Line platforms)	London and North Western Railway	1962
Williamstown	North British Railway	1850
Willington (Bedfordshire)	London and North Western Railway	1968
Willington (Durham)	NER	1964
Willington Quay	NER	1973
Willoughby	GNR	1970
Wilmington	Hull and Hornsea Railway / NER	1964
Wilpshire	Lancashire and Yorkshire Railway	1962
Wilsden	GNR	1955
Wilshampstead	London, Midland and Scottish Railway	1946
Wilson	Midland Railway	1871
Wilsontown	Caledonian Railway	1951
Wilsthorpe Crossing Halt	London and North Eastern Railway	1951
Wilstrop Siding	NER	1931
Wilton North	GWR	1955
Wilton South	London and South Western Railway	1966
Wimblington	Great Northern and Great Eastern Joint Railway	1967
Wimborne	London and South Western Railway	1964
Wincanton	Somerset and Dorset Joint Railway	1966
Winchburgh	North British Railway	1930
Winchcombe	GWR	1960 reopened 1987
Winchester (Chesil)	GWR	1960 regular services 1961 summer specials
Wincobank and Meadowhall	Midland Railway	1956
Wind Street, Burrows Lodge (Swansea)	GWR	1873
Winder	Whitehaven, Cleator and Egremont Junction Railway	1931
Windmill End Halt	GWR	1964
Windsor Bridge, Pendleton	Manchester and Bolton Railway	1856
Windsor Colliery Halt	Great Western Railway	1964
Winestead	NER	1904
Wingate	NER	1952
Wingfield	Midland Railway	1967
Wingfield Villas Halt (Plymouth)	GWR	1921
Wingham (Canterbury Road)	East Kent Light Railway	1948
Wingham Colliery	East Kent Light Railway	1948
Wingham Town	East Kent Light Railway	1948
Winkhill Halt	North Staffordshire Railway	1935
Winscombe	GWR	1963
Winsford and Over	Cheshire Lines Committee	1931
Winslow	London and North Western Railway	1968
Winslow Road	Metropolitan Railway	1936
Winson Green	London and North Western Railway	1957
Winson Green (formerly Soho & Winson Green)	Great Western Railway	1972
Winston	NER	1964
Winterbourne	GWR	1961
Winteringham	Great Central Railway	1925
Winterton and Thealby	Great Central Railway	1925
Winton	North British Railway	1925
Winwick Quay	Grand Junction Railway	1840
Wirksworth	Midland Railway	1947 reopened by Ecclesbourne Valley Rly.
Wisbech East	Great Eastern Railway	1968
Wisbech North	Midland and Great Northern Joint Railway	1959
Wisbech St Mary	Midland and Great Northern Joint Railway	1959
Wishaw South	Caledonian Railway	1958
Wishford	GWR	1955
Wistanstow Halt	Great Western Railway	1956
Wistow	NER	1930
Witham (Somerset)	GWR	1966
Withcall	GNR	1951
Withernsea	NER	1964
Withington and West Didsbury	Midland Railway	1961
Withington (Gloucestershire)	Midland and South Western Junction Railway	1961
Withington (Hereford)	GWR	1961
Withins Lane	East Lancashire Railway	1851
Withnell	Lancashire and Yorkshire Railway & Lancashire Union Railway joint	1960
Withyham	London, Brighton and South Coast Railway	1967
Witney	GWR	1873; 1962
Wittersham Road	Kent and East Sussex Railway	1954 reopened 1977
Witton Gilbert	NER	1939
Witton-le-Wear	NER	1953
Wiveliscombe	GWR	1966
Wixford	Midland Railway	1950

=== Wn ===
Station (Town, unless in station name)	Rail company	Year closed
Wnion Halt	GWR	1965

=== Wo ===
Station (Town, unless in station name)	Rail company	Year closed
Wolferton	Great Eastern Railway	1969
Wolf's Castle Halt	GWR	1964
Wollerton Halt	GWR	1963
Wolsingham	NER	1953 reopened 2004
Wolvercote Halt	London and North Western Railway	1926
Wolvercot Platform	GWR	1916
Wolverhampton	Shrewsbury and Birmingham Railway	1852
Wolverhampton Low Level	GWR	1972
Wombourn	GWR	1932
Wombwell Central	Great Central Railway	1959
Womersley	Lancashire and Yorkshire Railway	1947
Wooburn Green	GWR	1970
Wood Green (Old Bescot)	London and North Western Railway	1941
Wood Lane – Central Line	Central London Railway	1947
Wood Lane – Metropolitan Line later named White City	Metropolitan Railway	1959
Wood Siding	Metropolitan Railway	1935
Woodborough	GWR	1966
Woodburn	North British Railway	1952
Woodchester	Midland Railway	1947
Woodcroft (Ditcham Park) Halt	Southern Railway	1945
Woodend	Whitehaven, Cleator and Egremont Junction Railway	1947
Woodfield	Lancashire and Yorkshire Railway	1874
Woodford Halse	Great Central Railway	1966
Woodgate	London, Brighton and South Coast Railway	1864
Woodhall Junction	GNR	1970
Woodhall Spa	GNR	1954
Woodhay	GWR	1960
Woodhead	Great Central Railway	1964
Woodhill Road Halt	Lancashire and Yorkshire Railway	1952
Woodhouse Mill	Midland Railway	1953
Woodkirk	GNR	1939
Woodland	Furness Railway	1958
Woodland Park	London and North Western Railway	1930
Woodnesborough	East Kent Light Railway	1948
Woodside (Aberdeen)	Great North of Scotland Railway	1937
Woodside (London)	South Eastern Railway (UK)	1997
Woodstock Road Halt	North and South Western Junction Railway	1917
Woodvale	Cheshire Lines Committee	1952
Woodville	Midland Railway	1947
Woodville Road Halt	Taff Vale Railway	1958
Woody Bay	Lynton and Barnstaple Railway	1935
Woofferton	Shrewsbury and Hereford Railway	1961
Wookey	GWR	1963
Woolaston	GWR	1954
Wooler	North Eastern Railway	1930
Woolfold	Lancashire and Yorkshire Railway	1952
Woolley	Ashover Light Railway	1936
Wooperton	North Eastern Railway	1930
Wootton (Isle of Wight)	Isle of Wight Railway	1953
Wootton Bassett Road	GWR	1841
Wootton Bassett Junction	GWR	1965
Wootton Broadmead Halt	London and North Western Railway	1941
Wootton Rivers Halt	GWR	1966
Workington Bridge	London and North Western Railway	1951
Workington Central	Cleator and Workington Junction Railway	1931
Workington North	Network Rail	2010
Worle	GWR	1922
Worle Town	Weston, Clevedon and Portishead Railway	1940
Worleston	London and North Western Railway	1952
Worlington Golf Links Halt	Great Eastern Railway	1962
Worlingworth	Mid-Suffolk Light Railway	1952
Wormald Green	North Eastern Railway	1962
Wormit	North British Railway	1969
Worsley	London and North Western Railway	1969
Worthington	Midland Railway	1930
Worthy Down Halt	GWR	1960
Wortley	Sheffield, Ashton-under-Lyne and Manchester Railway	1955
Wortwell	Great Eastern Railway	1878
Wotton	Great Central Railway	1953
Wotton	Metropolitan Railway	1935

=== Wr ===
Station (Town, unless in station name)	Rail company	Year closed
Wrafton	London and South Western Railway	1970
Wragby	GNR	1951
Wrangaton	GWR	1959
Wray	"Little" North Western Railway	1850
Wraysholme Halt	Furness Railway	1922
Wrea Green	Preston and Wyre Joint Railway	1961
Wreay	London and North Western Railway	1943
Wretham and Hockham	Great Eastern Railway	1964
Wrington	GWR	1931
Wroxall	Isle of Wight Railway	1966
Wryde	Midland and Great Northern Joint Railway	1957

=== Wy ===
Station (Town, unless in station name)	Rail company	Year closed
Wyesham Halt	GWR	1959
Wyke and Norwood Green	Lancashire and Yorkshire Railway	1953
Wyke Regis Halt	Weymouth and Portland Railway	1952
Wykeham	North Eastern Railway	1950
Wyllie Halt	London, Midland and Scottish Railway	1960
Wylye	GWR	1955
Wyndham Halt	GWR	1958
Wynn Hall Halt	GWR	1915
Wynnville Halt	GWR	1960
Wynyard	North Eastern Railway	1931
Wyre Dock	Preston and Wyre Joint Railway	1970
Wyre Forest	GWR	1962
Wyre Halt	GWR	1966
Wyrley and Cheslyn Hay	London and North Western Railway	1965

== Y ==
Station (Town, unless in station name)	Rail company	Year closed
Yapham Gate	NER	1865
Yapton	London, Brighton and South Coast Railway	1864
Yarborough Street	Grimsby and Immingham Tramway	1956
Yarde Halt	Southern Railway	1965
Yarm	NER	1960 new station opened 1996
Yarm Depots	Stockton and Darlington Railway	1833
Yarmouth (Isle of Wight)	Freshwater, Yarmouth and Newport Railway	1953
Yarmouth Beach	Midland and Great Northern Joint Railway	1959
Yarmouth South Town	Norfolk and Suffolk Joint Railway	1970
Yarnton	GWR	1962
Yate	Midland Railway	1965 reopened 1989
Yaxham	Great Eastern Railway	1969
Yaxley and Farcet	GNR	1959
Yaxley Halt	Great Eastern Railway	1931
Yeadon	Midland Railway	1964 (not in regular passenger use)
Yealmpton	GWR	1947
Yearsett	GWR	1877
Yeathouse	Whitehaven, Cleator and Egremont Junction Railway	1931
Yeldham	Colne Valley and Halstead Railway	1962
Yelvertoft and Stanford Park	London and North Western Railway	1966
Yelverton	GWR	1962
Yeo Mill Halt	GWR	1966
Yeoveney Halt	GWR	1962
Yeovil Hendford	Bristol and Exeter Railway	1861
Yeovil Town	GWR and LSWR Joint	1966
Ynys	London and North Western Railway	1964
Ynysddu	London and North Western Railway	1960
Ynysferlas Halt	Welsh Highland Railway	1936
Ynysfor	Welsh Highland Railway	1936
Ynyshir	Taff Vale Railway	1964
Ynyslas	Cambrian Railways	1965
Ynysybwl	Taff Vale Railway	1952
Ynysybwl (New Road) Halt	Taff Vale Railway	1952
Ynysygeinon	Neath and Brecon Railway	1862
Yockleton	Shrewsbury and Welshpool Railway	1960
Yoker Ferry	Caledonian Railway	1964
York (Layerthorpe)	Derwent Valley Light Railway	1926
York old railway station	North Eastern Railway	1877
York Racecourse	North Eastern Railway	1939
York Road	Great Northern, Piccadilly and Brompton Railway	1932
York, Rowntree Halt	LNER	1988
Yorkhill	North British Railway	1921
Ystalyfera	Midland Railway	1950
Ystradgynlais	Neath and Brecon Railway	1932
Ystradowen	Taff Vale Railway	1951
