= List of schools in North Somerset =

This is a list of schools in North Somerset in the English county of Somerset.

== State-funded schools ==
=== Primary schools ===
- All Saints CE Primary School, Clevedon
- Ashcombe Primary School, Weston-super-Mare
- Backwell CE Junior School, Backwell
- Banwell Primary School, Banwell
- Becket Primary School, Worle
- Birdwell Primary School, Long Ashton
- Blagdon Primary School, Blagdon
- Bournville Primary School, Weston-super-Mare
- Burrington CE Primary School, Burrington
- Castle Batch Primary School Academy, Worle
- Chestnut Park Primary, North End
- Christ Church CE Primary School, Weston-super-Mare
- Churchill CE Primary School, Lower Langford
- Corpus Christi RC Primary School, Weston-super-Mare
- Court de Wyck Church School, Claverham
- Crockerne CE Primary School, Pill
- Dundry CE Primary School, Dundry
- Flax Bourton CE Primary School, Flax Bourton
- Golden Valley Primary School, Nailsea
- Grove Junior School, Nailsea
- Hannah More Infant School, Nailsea
- Haywood Village Academy, Weston-super-Mare
- Herons' Moor Academy, Weston-super-Mare
- High Down Infant School, Portishead
- High Down Junior School, Portishead
- Hutton CE Primary School, Hutton
- Kewstoke Primary School, Kewstoke
- Kingshill Church School, Nailsea
- Locking Primary School, Locking
- Mary Elton Primary School, Clevedon
- Mead Vale Community Primary School, Worle
- Mendip Green Primary School, Worle
- Milton Park Primary School, Milton
- Northleaze CE Primary School, Long Ashton
- Oldmixon Primary School, Oldmixon
- Parklands Educate Together Primary, Weston-super-Mare
- Portishead Primary School, Portishead
- St Andrew's CE Primary School, Congresbury
- St Anne's Church Academy, Puxton
- St Francis RC Primary School, Nailsea
- St Georges Church School, St Georges
- St John the Evangelist Church School, Clevedon
- St Joseph's RC Primary School, Portishead
- St Mark's Ecumenical CE/Methodist Primary School, Worle
- St Martin's CE Primary School, Worle
- St Mary's CE Primary School, Portbury
- St Nicholas Chantry CE Primary School, Clevedon
- St Peter's CE Primary School, Portishead
- Sandford Primary School, Sandford
- Tickenham CE Primary School, Tickenham
- Trinity Anglican-Methodist Primary School, Portishead
- Uphill Village Academy, Uphill
- Walliscote Primary School, Weston-super-Mare
- West Leigh Infant School, Backwell
- Windwhistle Primary School, Weston-super-Mare
- Winford CE Primary School, Winford
- Winscombe Primary School, Winscombe
- Worle Village Primary School, Worle
- Worlebury St Pauls CE First School, Weston-super-Mare
- Wraxall CE Primary School, Wraxall
- Wrington CE Primary School, Wrington
- Yatton CE Junior School, Yatton
- Yatton Infant School, Yatton
- Yeo Moor Primary School, Clevedon

=== Secondary schools ===
- Backwell School, Backwell
- Broadoak Academy, Weston-super-Mare
- Churchill Academy, Churchill
- Clevedon School, Clevedon
- Gordano School, Portishead
- Hans Price Academy, Weston-super-Mare
- Nailsea School, Nailsea
- Priory Community School, Weston-super-Mare
- St Katherine's School, Ham Green
- Winterstoke Hundred Academy, Weston-super-Mare
- Worle Community School, Worle

=== Special and alternative schools ===
- Baytree School, Weston-super-Mare
- Lime Hills Academy, Nailsea
- Ravenswood School, Nailsea
- Voyage Learning Campus, Milton
- Westhaven School, Uphill

=== Further education ===
- Weston College, Weston-super-Mare

== Independent schools ==
=== Primary and preparatory schools ===
- Ashbrooke House School, Weston-super-Mare
- Downs Preparatory School, Wraxall
- Fairfield School, Backwell

=== Senior and all-through schools ===
- Sidcot School, Winscombe

=== Special and alternative schools ===
- Seven Hills, Clevedon

== See also ==
- List of schools in Somerset

== Sources ==
- "Find your local school". North Somerset Council.
