= Clevedon railway station (WCP) =

Disused railway station in Clevedon, North Somerset

Coordinates: 51.4351°N 2.8547°W

Clevedon
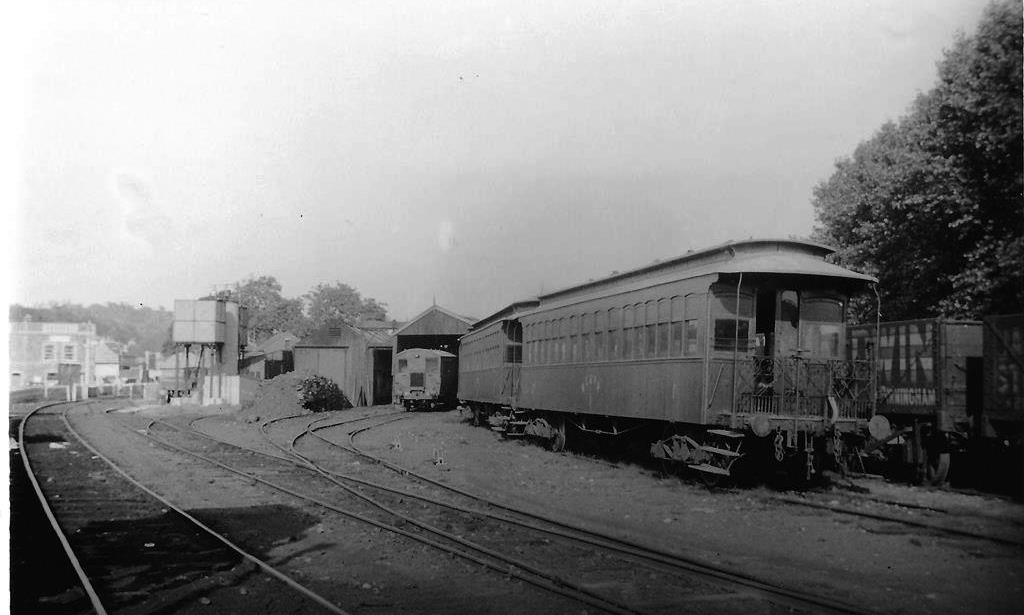
- The station and carriage shed in the 1930s

General information
- Location: Clevedon, North Somerset; England
- Platforms: 1

Other information
- Status: Disused

History
- Original company: Weston, Clevedon and Portishead Railway
- Pre-grouping: Weston, Clevedon and Portishead Railway

Key dates
- 1 December 1897: Opened
- 20 May 1940: Closed
Location

Clevedon railway station served the town of Clevedon, North Somerset, England, from 1897 to 1940 on the Weston, Clevedon and Portishead Railway.

== History ==
The station was opened on 1 December 1897 by the Weston, Clevedon and Portishead Railway. It was originally a terminus until 1907, when Portishead opened to the north, as well as the stations in between. The platform was later rebuilt higher than the original one and a waiting shelter was built on it. It also had an engine shed and goods sidings, one serving a gas works. The station closed on 20 May 1940.

| Preceding station | Disused railways | Following station |
|---|---|---|
| Clevedon East; Line and station closed | Weston, Clevedon and Portishead Railway | Colehouse Lane; Line and station closed |
