= Bristol Road railway station =

Disused railway station in Worle, North Somerset

Coordinates: 51.3546°N 2.9361°W

Bristol Road

General information
- Location: Worle, North Somerset; England

Other information
- Status: Disused

History
- Original company: Weston, Clevedon and Portishead Railway
- Pre-grouping: Weston, Clevedon and Portishead Railway

Key dates
- July 1912: Opened
- 20 May 1940: Closed
Location

Bristol Road railway station served the village of Worle, North Somerset, England, from 1912 to 1940 on the Weston, Clevedon and Portishead Railway.

== History ==
The station opened in July 1912 by the Weston, Clevedon and Portishead Railway. It had no shelter until 1938, when the station was repositioned on the other side of the crossing. It closed on 20 May 1940.

Preceding station	Disused railways	Following station
Worle Town; Line and station closed	Weston, Clevedon and Portishead Railway	Milton Road (Somerset); Line and station closed
