= Preston station =

Preston station may refer to:

- Preston Station, Houston, Texas, a neighborhood in the US

== Railway stations named "Preston" ==
- Preston station (Houston), Houston, Texas, US
- Preston railway station, Lancashire, England
- Preston railway station, Melbourne, Victoria, Australia

== Railway stations with names containing the word Preston ==
- Prestonpans railway station, East Lothian, Scotland
- Preston Brook railway station, former station in Cheshire, England
- Preston Deepdale Street railway station, former station in Lancashire, England
- Preston Fishergate Hill railway station, former station in Lancashire, England
- Preston Junction railway station, former station in Lancashire, England
- Preston Junction station, former station in Ontario, Canada
- Preston Maudlands railway station, former station in Lancashire, England
- Preston Maxwell House railway station, former station in Lancashire, England
- Preston Park railway station, Brighton, England
- Preston Riverside railway station, heritage station in Lancashire, England
- Preston Road railway station, former name of station in Liverpool, England
- Preston Road tube station, London underground
- Preston Street railway station, former station in Whitehaven, Cumberland, England
- Long Preston railway station, North Yorkshire, England
- Lowton and Preston Junction railway station, former station in Lancashire, England

== Other stations ==
- Preston bus station, Lancashire, England
