= WCSA =

WCSA may refer to:

- Wesleyan Council on Student Affairs
- Wolfson College Student Association
- Working-Class Studies Association
- Worle Community School Academy, a secondary school academy in the South West of England.
- World Complexity Science Academy
- World Crossbow Shooting Association, one of the two major crossbow federations. World Championship disciplines: Target, Target match play, Forest, Forest match play, 3D, Bench & prone target and Indoor target.
- WCSA (AM), a defunct radio station (1260 AM) formerly licensed to serve Ripley, Mississippi, United States
