= Broadstone railway station (disambiguation) =

Dublin Broadstone railway station was the former terminus of the Midland Great Western Railway in Dublin, Ireland

Broadstone railway station may also refer to the following stations in England:

- Broadstone railway station (Dorset), a former station on the Southampton and Dorchester Railway, in the Borough of Poole
- Broadstone railway station (Somerset), a former station on the Weston, Clevedon and Portishead Light Railway, near Kingston Seymour
