= Colehouse Lane railway station =

Disused railway station in North Somerset, England

Coordinates: 51.423°N 2.866°W

Colehouse Lane

General information
- Location: Clevedon, North Somerset; England

Other information
- Status: Disused

History
- Original company: Weston, Clevedon and Portishead Railway
- Pre-grouping: Weston, Clevedon and Portishead Railway

Key dates
- 1 December 1897: Opened
- 20 May 1940: Closed
Location

Colehouse Lane railway station served the town of Clevedon, North Somerset, England, from 1897 to 1940 on the Weston, Clevedon and Portishead Railway.

== History ==
The station opened on 1 December 1897 by the Weston, Clevedon and Portishead Railway. It was moved to the other side of the line in 1939 to make space for the BBC transmitter. The station closed on 20 May 1940.

Preceding station	Disused railways	Following station
Clevedon; Line and station closed	Weston, Clevedon and Portishead Railway	Kingston Road; Line and station closed
