= Portishead South railway station =

Disused railway station in Portishead, Somerset

Coordinates: 51.4765°N 2.7648°W

Portishead South

General information
- Location: Portishead, Somerset; England

Other information
- Status: Disused

History
- Original company: Weston, Clevedon and Portishead Railway
- Pre-grouping: Weston, Clevedon and Portishead Railway

Key dates
- 7 August 1907: Opened
- 20 May 1940: Closed
Location

Portishead South railway station served the town of Portishead, Somerset, England from 1907 to 1940 on the Weston, Clevedon and Portishead Railway.

== History ==
The station opened on 7 August 1907 by the Weston, Clevedon and Portishead Railway. It had no platform, just a shelter and a siding that was used by a coal merchant. It closed on 20 May 1940.

Preceding station	Disused railways	Following station
Portishead; Line and station closed	Weston, Clevedon and Portishead Railway	Clapton Road; Line and station closed
