= Church of St Martin, Worle =

Church in Somerset, England

Church of Saint Martin
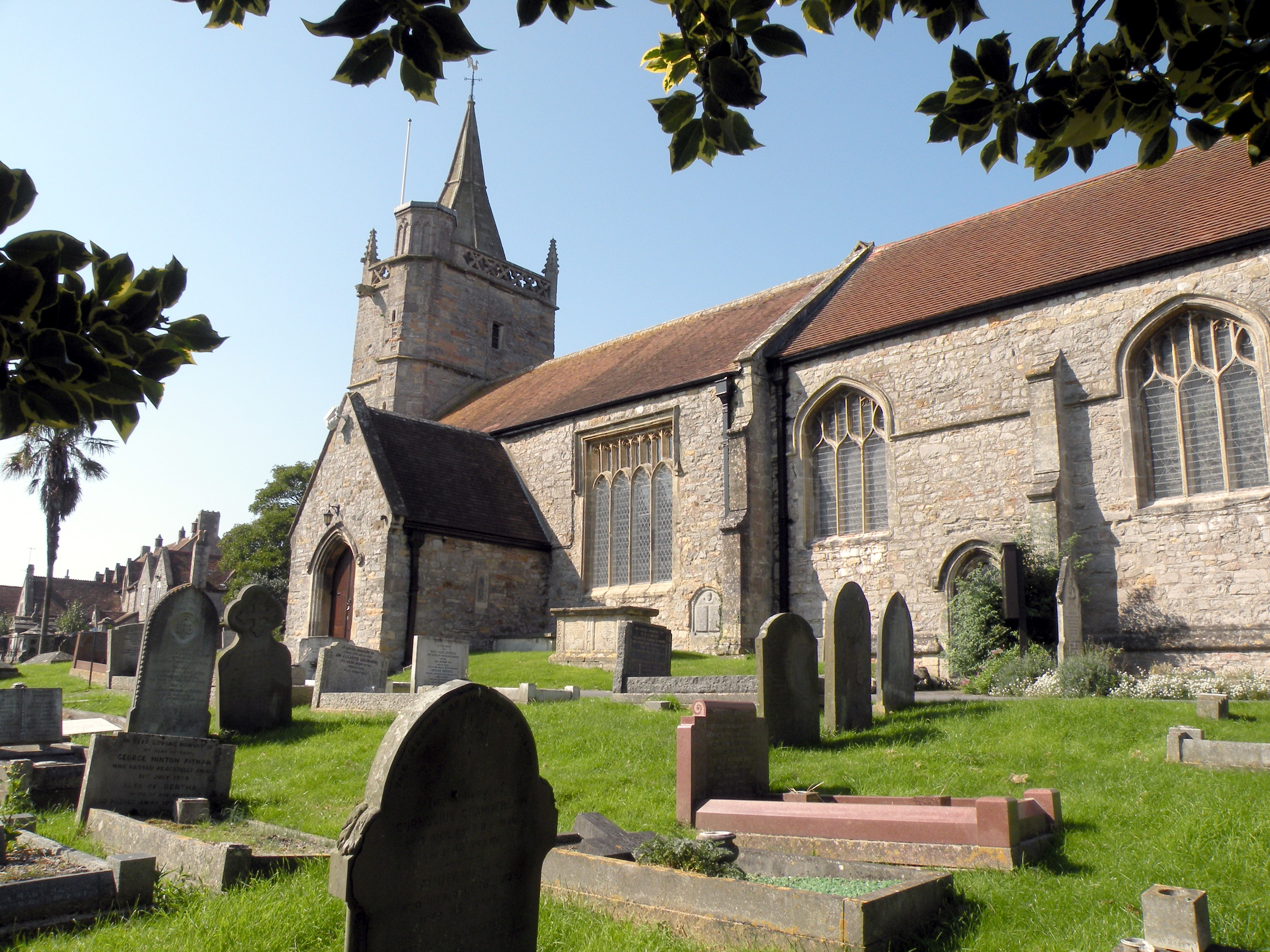

- Location within Somerset
- 51.3614°N 2.9306°W -->
- Location: Worle, Somerset, England

Listed Building – Grade II*
- Official name: Church of Saint Martin
- Designated: 19 May 1983
- Reference no.: 1137549

The Church of St Martin in Worle within the English county of Somerset has Norman origins. It is a Grade II* listed building.

== History ==
St Martin's Church was built in 1125 and rebuilt during the 14th and 15th centuries, with major restoration and extension work by John Norton in 1870 at the cost of £1,700. It reopened on the 5th November 1870. It is a Grade II* listed building. The West Gallery was built in 1988-1989 by Coffin, Jones and Roden in Simple Gothic style. The organ is an exceptional Baroque case and pipework made in Frankfurt in 1662 and later installed in a chapel in Blackburn, Lancashire, before being installed in St. Martin's in the 1860s. It was rebuilt in 1957.

The church was described by John Collinson in 1791 as 'a neat Gothick structure, consisting of a nave, chancel and north aisle: at the West end, is a low tower, surmounted with a small spire, and containing a clock and six bells. The christenings of this parish are 13, the burials, 5, annually'

Following the dissolution of the monasteries the carved misericords from Woodspring Priory were moved to the South side stalls of the chancel at St Martin's.

The Church is now ecumenical, with Methodist as well as Church of England ministers. The parish and benefice of Worle is within the Diocese of Bath and Wells.

== Architecture ==
The stone building has a tiled roof and consists of a four bay nave, chancel and north aisle. The three-stage tower is supported by angle buttresses.

== See also ==
- List of ecclesiastical parishes in the Diocese of Bath and Wells
