= All Saints railway station, Clevedon =

Disused railway station in Clevedon, North Somerset

Coordinates: 51.4421°N 2.8412°W

All Saints

General information
- Location: Clevedon, North Somerset; England

Other information
- Status: Disused

History
- Original company: Weston, Clevedon and Portishead Railway
- Pre-grouping: Weston, Clevedon and Portishead Railway

Key dates
- October 1917: Opened
- 20 May 1940: Closed
Location

All Saints railway station served the town of Clevedon, North Somerset, England, from 1917 to 1940 on the Weston, Clevedon and Portishead Railway.

== History ==
The station opened in October 1917 by the Weston, Clevedon and Portishead Railway. It had a level crossing with four gates, which were operated by the local blacksmith. The station closed on 20 May 1940. The site is now a footpath.

Preceding station	Disused railways	Following station
Walton Park; Line and station closed	Weston, Clevedon and Portishead Railway	Clevedon East; Line and station closed
