= Clapton Road railway station =

Disused railway station in Somerset, England

Coordinates: 51.4732°N 2.7687°W

Clapton Road
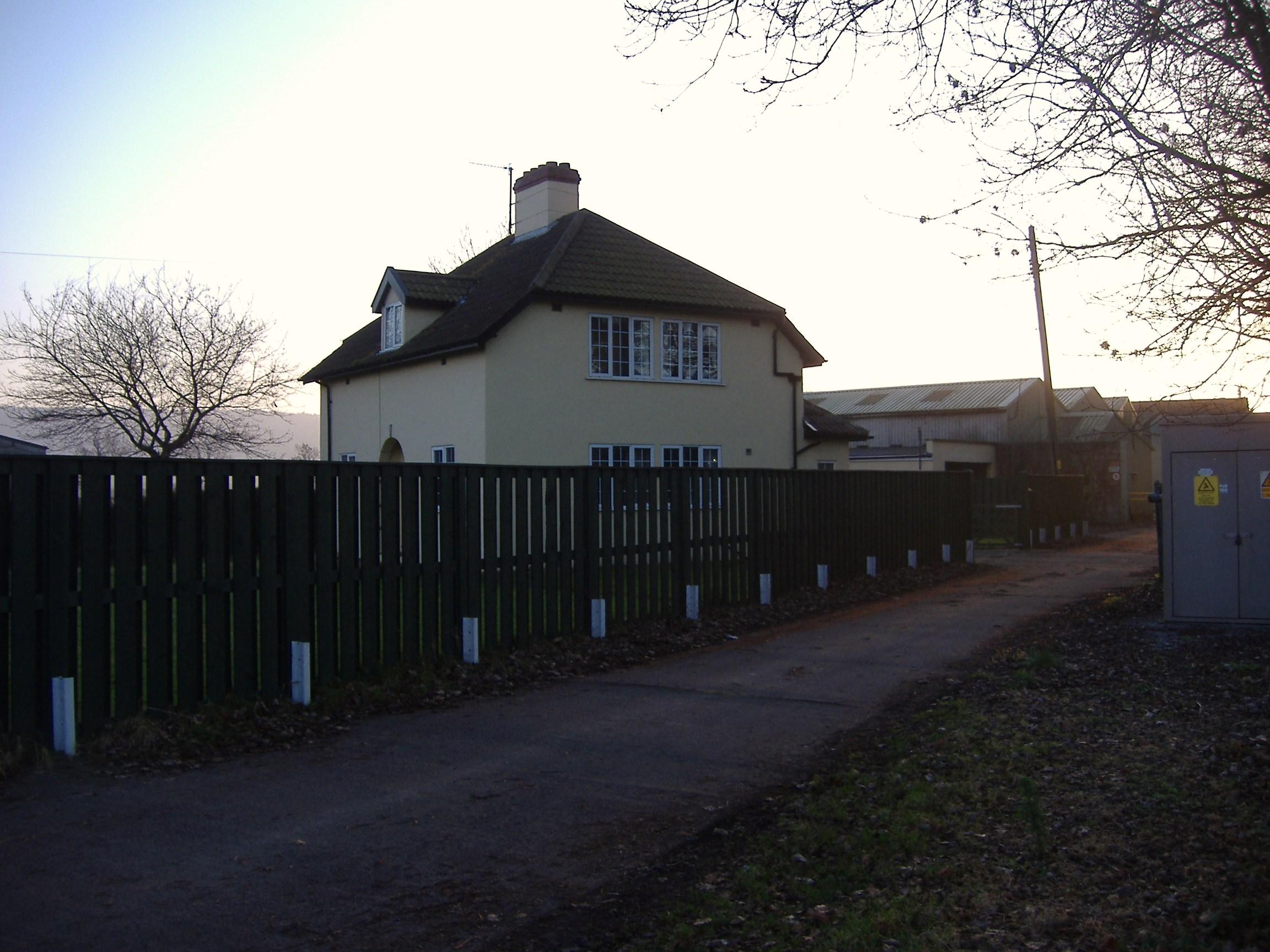
- The site of the station in 2009

General information
- Location: Clapton in Gordano, Somerset; England

Other information
- Status: Disused

History
- Original company: Weston, Clevedon and Portishead Railway
- Pre-grouping: Weston, Clevedon and Portishead Railway

Key dates
- 7 August 1907: Opened
- 20 May 1940: Closed
Location

Clapton Road railway station served the town of Clapton in Gordano, Somerset, England, from 1907 to 1940 on the Weston, Clevedon and Portishead Railway.

== History ==
The station opened on 7 August 1907 by the Weston, Clevedon and Portishead Railway. All it had was a sign and a cattle grid; there were no platforms or shelters. The station closed on 20 May 1940.

Preceding station	Disused railways	Following station
Portishead South; Line and station closed	Weston, Clevedon and Portishead Railway	Cadbury Road; Line and station closed
