= Milton Road (Somerset) railway station =

Disused railway station in Milton, North Somerset

Coordinates: 51.3534°N 2.9414°W

Milton Road

General information
- Location: Milton, North Somerset; England

Other information
- Status: Disused

History
- Original company: Weston, Clevedon and Portishead Railway
- Pre-grouping: Weston, Clevedon and Portishead Railway

Key dates
- 1 December 1897: Opened
- 20 May 1940: Closed
Location

Milton Road railway station served the suburb of Milton, North Somerset, England, from 1897 to 1940 on the Weston, Clevedon and Portishead Railway.

== History ==
The station opened on 1 December 1897 by the Weston, Clevedon and Portishead Railway. It had a small shelter and a coal siding. The gates were removed from the crossing in 1899 and was replaced by cattle grids. The station closed on 20 May 1940.

Preceding station	Historical railways	Following station
Bristol Road; Line and station closed	Weston, Clevedon and Portishead Railway	Ashcombe Road; Line and station closed
