= Cadbury Road railway station =

Disused railway station in Somerset, England

Coordinates: 51.4640°N 2.7959°W

Cadbury Road

General information
- Location: Weston in Gordano, Somerset; England

Other information
- Status: Disused

History
- Original company: Weston, Clevedon and Portishead Railway
- Pre-grouping: Weston, Clevedon and Portishead Railway

Key dates
- 7 August 1907: Opened
- 20 May 1940: Closed
Location

Cadbury Road railway station served the village of Weston in Gordano, Somerset, England, from 1907 to 1940 on the Weston, Clevedon and Portishead Railway.

== History ==
The station opened on 7 August 1907 by the Weston, Clevedon and Portishead Railway. There was a siding to the south during the First World War for supplying manure for the horse stables at Avonmouth. To the north was another siding which served Black Rock and Nightingale Quarries. The station closed on 20 May 1940.

Preceding station	Disused railways	Following station
Clapton Road; Line and station closed	Weston, Clevedon and Portishead Railway	Walton in Gordano; Line and station closed
