= Walpole Cross Keys =

Village in Norfolk, England

Coordinates: 52.755464°N 0.248308°E

- Location within Norfolk
- Area: 4.03 km^{2} (1.56 sq mi)
- Population: 518 (2011)
  - Density: 129/km^{2} (330/sq mi)
- OS grid reference: TF518199
- Civil parish: Walpole Cross Keys
- District: King's Lynn and West Norfolk
- Shire county: Norfolk
- Region: East
- Country: England
- Sovereign state: United Kingdom
- Post town: KING'S LYNN
- Postcode district: PE34
- Dialling code: 01553
- Police: Norfolk
- Fire: Norfolk
- Ambulance: East of England
- UK Parliament: North West Norfolk

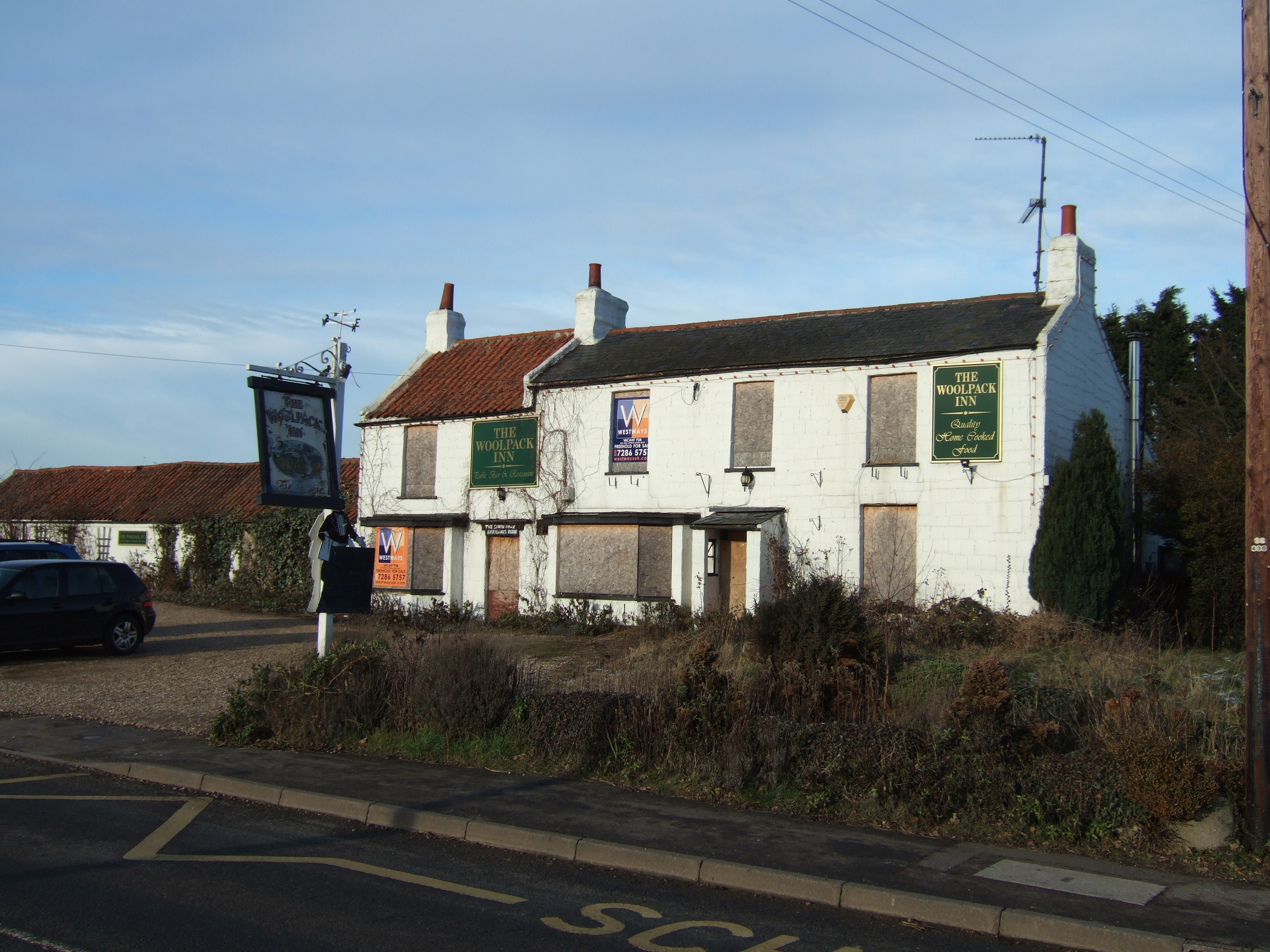
The Woolpack Inn in Walpole Cross Keys

Walpole Cross Keys is a village and civil parish in the English county of Norfolk. It covers an area of 4.03 km^{2} (1.56 sq mi) and had a population of 469 in 182 households at the 2001 census, the population increasing to 518 at the 2011 census. For the purposes of local government, it falls within the district of King's Lynn and West Norfolk. Walpole Cross Keys' Primary School received a 'good' rating from Ofsted following a short inspection in 2019.

Walpole railway station, closed in 1959, was within the parish.
