= Ham Lane railway station =

Disused railway station in Burnham-on-Sea, Somerset

Coordinates: 51.3973°N 2.8860°W

Ham Lane

General information
- Location: Kingston Seymour, Somerset; England

Other information
- Status: Disused

History
- Original company: Weston, Clevedon and Portishead Railway
- Pre-grouping: Weston, Clevedon and Portishead Railway

Key dates
- 1 December 1897: Opened
- 20 May 1940: Closed
Location

Ham Lane railway station served the village of Kingston Seymour, Somerset, England, from 1897 to 1940 on the Weston, Clevedon and Portishead Railway.

== History ==
The station opened on 1 December 1897 by the Weston, Clevedon and Portishead Railway. It had a milk platform and a siding. The station closed on 20 May 1940.

Preceding station	Disused railways	Following station
Broadstone (Somerset); Line and station closed	Weston, Clevedon and Portishead Railway	Wick St Lawrence; Line and station closed
