= Clevedon East railway station =

Disused railway station in Somerset, England

Coordinates: 51.4396°N 2.8403°W

Clevedon East

General information
- Location: Clevedon, North Somerset; England

Other information
- Status: Disused

History
- Original company: Weston, Clevedon and Portishead Railway
- Pre-grouping: Weston, Clevedon and Portishead Railway

Key dates
- 7 August 1907: Opened
- 20 May 1940: Closed
Location

Clevedon East railway station served the town of Clevedon, North Somerset, England, from 1907 to 1940 on the Weston, Clevedon and Portishead Railway.

== History ==
The station opened on 7 August 1907 by the Weston, Clevedon and Portishead Railway. Nearby was a level crossing, and to the south of this was a siding which served Weech's Joinery Works. The station closed on 20 May 1940.

Preceding station	Disused railways	Following station
Clevedon All Saints; Line and station closed	Weston, Clevedon and Portishead Railway	Clevedon; Line and station closed
