= Ebdon Lane railway station =

Disused railway station in Ebdon, North Somerset

Coordinates: 51.3747°N 2.9065°W

Ebdon Lane

General information
- Location: Ebdon, North Somerset; England

Other information
- Status: Disused

History
- Original company: Weston, Clevedon and Portishead Railway
- Pre-grouping: Weston, Clevedon and Portishead Railway

Key dates
- 1 December 1897: Opened
- 20 May 1940: Closed
Location

Ebdon Lane railway station served the suburb of Ebdon, North Somerset, England, from 1897 to 1940 on the Weston, Clevedon and Portishead Railway.

== History ==
The station opened on 1 December 1897 by the Weston, Clevedon and Portishead Railway. It had a level crossing with no gates and a milk platform, although this was later removed. The station closed on 20 May 1940.

Preceding station	Disused railways	Following station
Wick St Lawrence; Line and station closed	Weston, Clevedon and Portishead Railway	Worle Town; Line and station closed
