= Blackpill railway station =

Disused railway station in Blackpill, Swansea

Blackpill
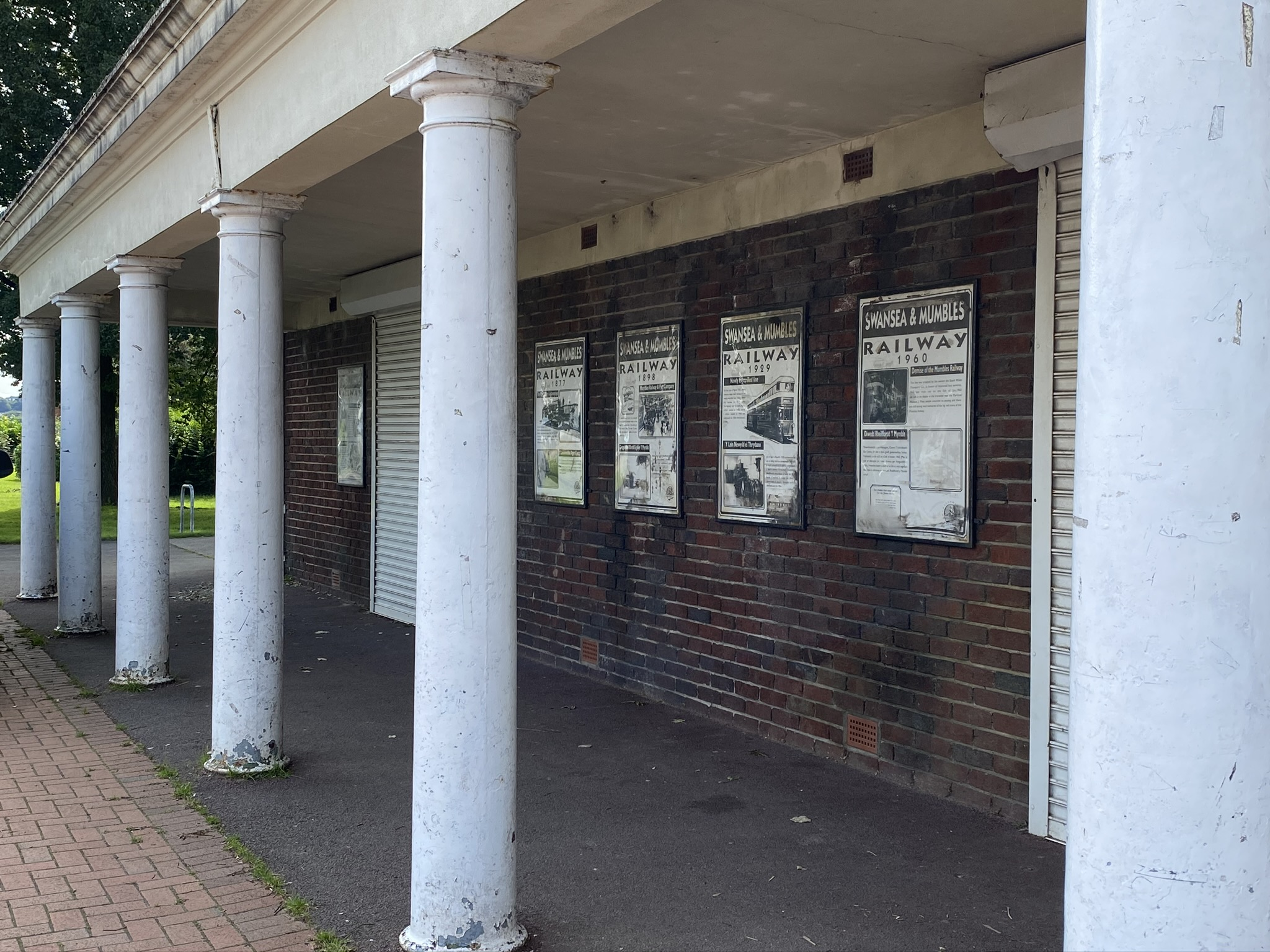
- The site of the station in 2020

General information
- Location: Blackpill, Glamorgan; Wales
- Coordinates: 51.5965°N 3.995°W
- Grid reference: SS619905

Other information
- Status: Disused

History
- Original company: Oystermouth Railway
- Pre-grouping: Swansea and Mumbles Railway; Swansea Improvements and Tramway Company
- Post-grouping: Swansea Improvements and Tramway Company

Key dates
- 25 March 1807: Opened
- 1827: Closed
- 25 July 1860: Reopened
- 26 August 1900: Resited
- 6 January 1960: Closed
Location

Blackpill railway station served the suburb of Blackpill, in the historical county of Glamorgan, Wales, from 1807 to 1960 on the Swansea and Mumbles Railway.

== History ==
The station was opened on 25 March 1807 by the Oystermouth Railway. Like the rest of the stations on the line, the first services were horse-drawn. It closed in 1827 but it reopened on 25 July 1860. It was known as Blackpill Road and Bishopston Road in some timetables and Blackpill or Bishopston Road in the 22 January 1875 edition of Cambrian Railways. It was resited on 26 August 1900. The station closed along with the line on 6 January 1960.

Preceding station	Disused railways	Following station
Ashleigh Road; Line and station closed	Swansea and Mumbles Railway	West Cross; Line and station closed
