= West London Junction (LBR) railway station =

West London Junction
- Location of West London Junction in Greater London
- Number of platforms: 3

Key dates
- 27 May 1844: Opened
- 1 December 1844: closed
- 2 March 1863: Relocated and reopened
- 1 December 1866: Closed

Other information
- Coordinates: 51.530213°N 0.244515°W

West London Junction was a railway station on the London and Birmingham Railway and West London Railway. It opened on 27 May 1844 and closed on 1 December 1844. The station was relocated and reopened on 2 March 1863 and lasted 3 more years until final closure in 1866.
