= Wearmouth railway station =

Disused railway station in Monkwearmouth, Tyne and Wear

Wearmouth

General information
- Location: Monkwearmouth, Tyne and Wear; England
- Coordinates: 54.9159°N 1.377°W
- Grid reference: NZ400580

Other information
- Status: Disused

History
- Original company: Brandling Junction Railway
- Pre-grouping: Newcastle and Darlington Junction Railway; York, Newcastle and Berwick Railway

Key dates
- 19 June 1839: Opened
- 19 June 1848: Closed
Location

Wearmouth railway station served the area of Monkwearmouth, Tyne and Wear, England, from 1839 to 1848 on the Brandling Junction Railway.

== History ==
The station was opened on 19 June 1839 by the Brandling Junction Railway. It was known as Monkwearmouth in the notice and the newspapers. It closed on 19 June 1848, being replaced by Monkwearmouth station.
