= Warden railway station =

Short-lived railway station in Warden, Northumberland

Warden

General information
- Location: Warden, Northumberland; England
- Platforms: 2

Other information
- Status: Disused

History
- Original company: Newcastle and Carlisle Railway
- Pre-grouping: Newcastle and Carlisle Railway

Key dates
- 28 June 1836: Opened
- January 1837: Closed

Warden railway station served the village of Warden, Northumberland, England from 1836 to 1837 on the Newcastle and Carlisle Railway.

== History ==
The station opened on 28 June 1836 by the Newcastle and Carlisle Railway. It was a short-lived station that was only open for 7 months, closing in early January 1837.

Preceding station	Disused railways	Following station
Fourstones; Line and station closed	Newcastle and Carlisle Railway	Hexham; Line and station closed
