= Walton in Gordano railway station =

Disused railway station in Walton in Gordano, North Somerset

Coordinates: 51.4536°N 2.8253°W

Walton in Gordano

General information
- Location: Walton in Gordano, North Somerset; England

Other information
- Status: Disused

History
- Original company: Weston, Clevedon and Portishead Railway
- Pre-grouping: Weston, Clevedon and Portishead Railway

Key dates
- 7 August 1907: Opened
- 20 May 1940: Closed
Location

Walton in Gordano railway station served the village of Walton in Gordano, North Somerset, England from 1907 to 1940 on the Weston, Clevedon and Portishead Railway.

== History ==
The station opened on 7 August 1907 by the Weston, Clevedon and Portishead Railway. A loop siding and a cattle pen were built nearby in 1926. The station closed on 20 May 1940.

Preceding station	Disused railways	Following station
Cadbury Road; Line and station closed	Weston, Clevedon and Portishead Railway	Walton Park; Line and station closed
