= Broadstone railway station (Somerset) =

Disused railway station in England

Broadstone

General information
- Location: Kingston Seymour, Somerset; England
- Coordinates: 51.4027°N 2.8832°W
- Platforms: 1

Other information
- Status: Disused

History
- Original company: WC&PLR

Key dates
- August 1918: station opens
- 1940: station closes
Location

Broadstone (Somerset) railway station was a very small halt on the Weston, Clevedon and Portishead Light Railway which operated in Somerset between 1918 and 1940.

== History ==
The station was opened in 1918. It was located on a level crossing, a mile from the village of Kingston Seymour. It had no built platforms, and possessed only a very small wooden shelter, not much larger than a telephone booth. Despite its small proportions, the suffix 'halt' was not used.

Broadstone closed along with the railway in 1940.

== Present Day ==
The site of the station was not visible to the casual observer for many years. The WC&P Railway Group has erected a replica of the wooden shelter at the location.

Preceding station	Disused railways	Following station
Kingston Road	Weston, Clevedon & Portishead Light Railway	Ham Lane
