= Weston-super-Mare Ashcombe Road railway station =

Disused railway station in Weston-super-Mare, Somerset

Coordinates: 51.3502°N 2.9647°W

Ashcombe Road
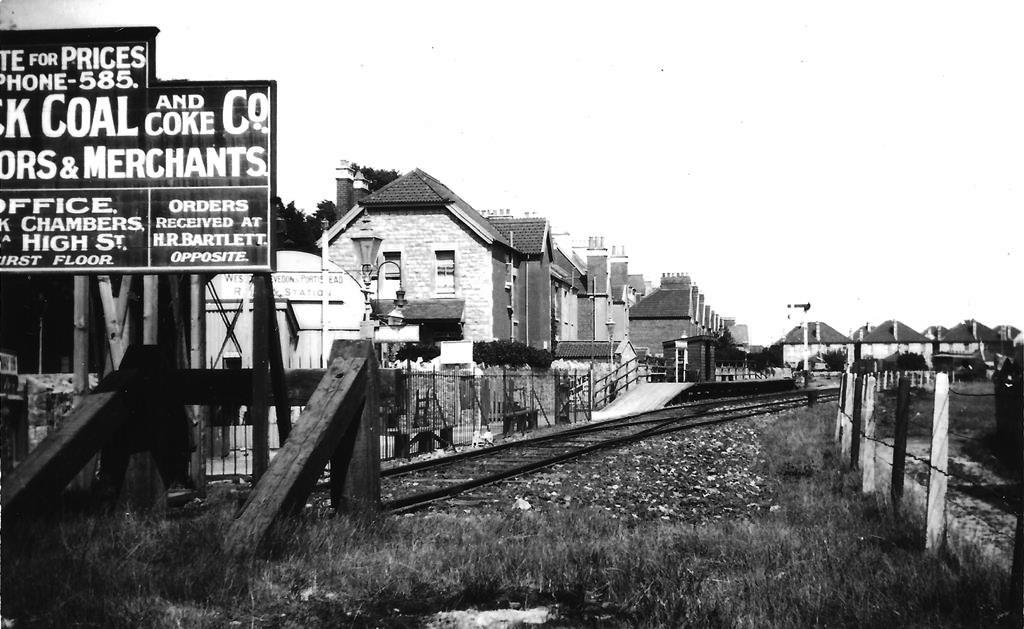

General information
- Location: Weston-super-Mare, Somerset; England
- Platforms: 1

Other information
- Status: Disused

History
- Original company: Weston, Clevedon and Portishead Railway
- Pre-grouping: Weston, Clevedon and Portishead Railway

Key dates
- 1 December 1897: Opened
- 20 May 1940: Closed
Location

Weston-super-Mare Ashcombe Road railway station served the town of Weston-super-Mare, Somerset, England, from 1897 to 1940 on the Weston, Clevedon and Portishead Railway.

== History ==
The station opened on 1 December 1897 by the Weston, Clevedon and Portishead Railway. It had toilets and a waiting room. The platform was ten inches high until raised in 1919. The railway was intended to carry on past this station but the track was removed after a dispute with the council. The station closed on 20 May 1940. A florists occupies the site of the booking office while a footpath follows part of the trackbed.

| Preceding station | Disused railways | Following station |
|---|---|---|
| Milton Road (Somerset); Line and station closed | Weston, Clevedon and Portishead Railway | Terminus |
