= Walpole railway station (England) =

Former railway station in Norfolk, England

Coordinates: 52.7486°N 0.2497°E

Walpole
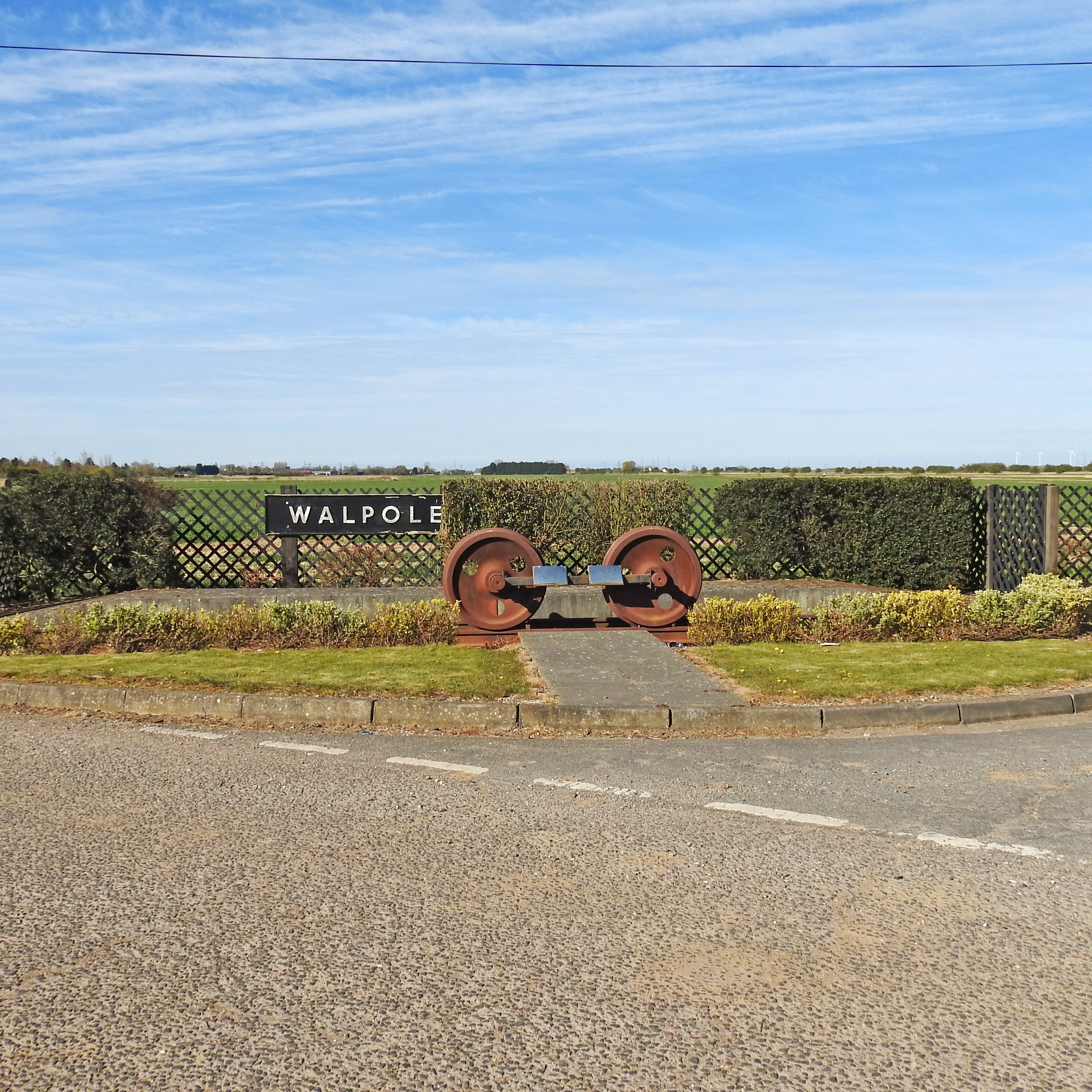
- The station memorial and sign in 2021

General information
- Location: Walpole Cross Keys, King's Lynn and West Norfolk; England
- Grid reference: TF520190
- Platforms: 2

Other information
- Status: Disused

History
- Pre-grouping: Lynn & Sutton Bridge Railway; Midland and Great Northern Joint Railway
- Post-grouping: Midland and Great Northern Joint Railway; Eastern Region of British Railways

Key dates
- 1 March 1866: Opened
- 2 March 1959: Closed
Location

Walpole railway station was a station in Norfolk. It is now disused.

First opened in 1866, it was part of the Midland and Great Northern Joint Railway line between the Midlands and the Norfolk coast. It took its name from the cluster of villages surrounding Walpole Hall, being nearest to Walpole Cross Keys. It was located very close to the Lincolnshire border. It closed along with the rest of the line in 1959.

Former Services

Preceding station	Disused railways	Following station
Sutton Bridge	Midland and Great Northern	Terrington
