= West London Junction railway station =

Short-lived railway station in London, England

West London Junction

General information
- Location: London, City of London; England
- Coordinates: 51.5256°N 0.2347°W
- Grid reference: TQ225822

Other information
- Status: Disused

History
- Original company: West London Railway

Key dates
- 27 May 1844: Opened
- 1 December 1844: Closed
Location

West London Junction railway station served the city of London, England, in 1844 on the West London Railway.

== History ==
The station was opened on 27 May 1844 by the West London Railway. It was known as Great Western Junction in a notice issued by the London and Birmingham Railway. It was a very short-lived station, being open for six months before closing on 1 December 1844.
