= Wick St Lawrence railway station =

Disused railway station in Wick St Lawrence, Somerset

Coordinates: 51.3832°N 2.8972°W

Wick St Lawrence

General information
- Location: Wick St Lawrence, Somerset; England

Other information
- Status: Disused

History
- Original company: Weston, Clevedon and Portishead Railway
- Pre-grouping: Weston, Clevedon and Portishead Railway

Key dates
- 1 December 1897: Opened
- 20 May 1940: Closed
Location

Wick St Lawrence railway station served the civil parish of Wick St Lawrence, Somerset, England, from 1897 to 1940 on the Weston, Clevedon and Portishead Railway. Even though it was intended to serve Wick St Lawrence, it was situated a mile away from the village. It had a ticket office, a waiting room and was staffed until 1928. The station closed on 20 May 1940.

== Present ==
The station is to be rebuilt by the North Somerset Council as a feature of a cycleway. Planning was completed in 2018, funding was secured in May 2020 and construction is to begin in 2021.

Preceding station	Disused railways	Following station
Ham Lane; Line and station closed	Weston, Clevedon and Portishead Railway	Ebdon Lane; Line and station closed
