= West Cross railway station =

Disused railway station in West Cross, Swansea

West Cross

General information
- Location: West Cross, Glamorgan; Wales
- Coordinates: 51.586°N 4.0004°W
- Grid reference: SS615893

Other information
- Status: Disused

History
- Original company: Oystermouth Railway
- Pre-grouping: Swansea and Mumbles Railway; Swansea Improvements and Tramway Company
- Post-grouping: Swansea Improvements and Tramway Company

Key dates
- 25 March 1807: Opened
- 1827: Closed
- 11 November 1860: Reopened
- 26 August 1900: Resited
- 5 March 1910: Resited again
- 6 January 1960: Closed
Location

West Cross railway station served the suburb of West Cross, in the historical county of Glamorgan, Wales, from 1807 to 1960 on the Swansea and Mumbles Railway.

== History ==
The station was opened on 25 March 1807 by the Oystermouth Railway. Like the rest of the stations on the line, the first services were horse-drawn. It closed in 1827 but it reopened on 11 November 1860. It was first known as West Cross Road in Bradshaw. It was resited on the line deviation on 26 August 1900 and resited again, closer to Norton Road, on 5 March 1910. It was briefly renamed West Cross New in Bradshaw. It was also known as West Cross Road in the handbook of stations until 1938. The station closed along with the line on 6 January 1960.

Preceding station	Disused railways	Following station
Blackpill; Line and station closed	Swansea and Mumbles Railway	Norton Road; Line and station closed
