= Walton Park railway station =

Disused railway station in Walton in Gordano, North Somerset

Coordinates: 51.4475°N 2.8379°W

Walton Park

General information
- Location: Walton in Gordano, North Somerset; England

Other information
- Status: Disused

History
- Original company: Weston, Clevedon and Portishead Railway
- Pre-grouping: Weston, Clevedon and Portishead Railway

Key dates
- 7 August 1907: Opened
- 20 May 1940: Closed
Location

Walton Park railway station served the village of Walton in Gordano, North Somerset, England from 1907 to 1940 on the Weston, Clevedon and Portishead Railway.

== History ==
The station opened on 7 August 1907 by the Weston, Clevedon and Portishead Railway. It had two sidings nearby, one was made into a loop on 1919 and the other served Conygar Quarry. The station closed on 20 May 1940.

Preceding station	Disused railways	Following station
Walton in Gordano; Line and station closed	Weston, Clevedon and Portishead Railway	Clevedon All Saints; Line and station closed
