= Priory Community School =

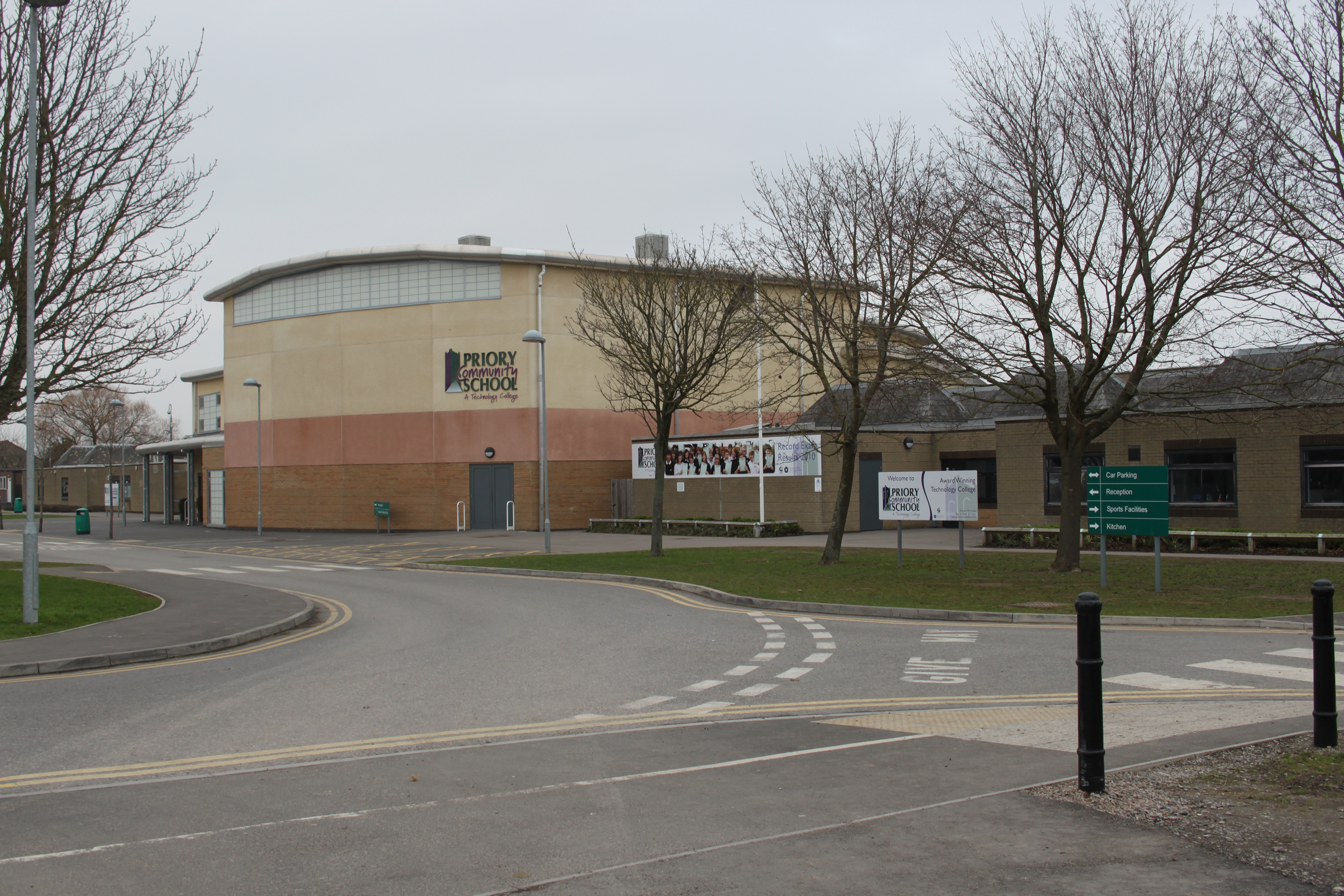

Location
- Queensway; Worle, North Somerset; England; 51°21′51″N 2°54′34″W

Information
- Type: Academy
- Motto: Students First
- Established: 1975; 51 years ago
- Trust: Pathway trust
- Department for Education URN: 137300 Tables
- Ofsted: Reports
- Principal: Angelos Markoutsas
- Age: 11 to 16
- Enrolment: 1,509 (2024)
- Website: www.priory.n-somerset.sch.uk

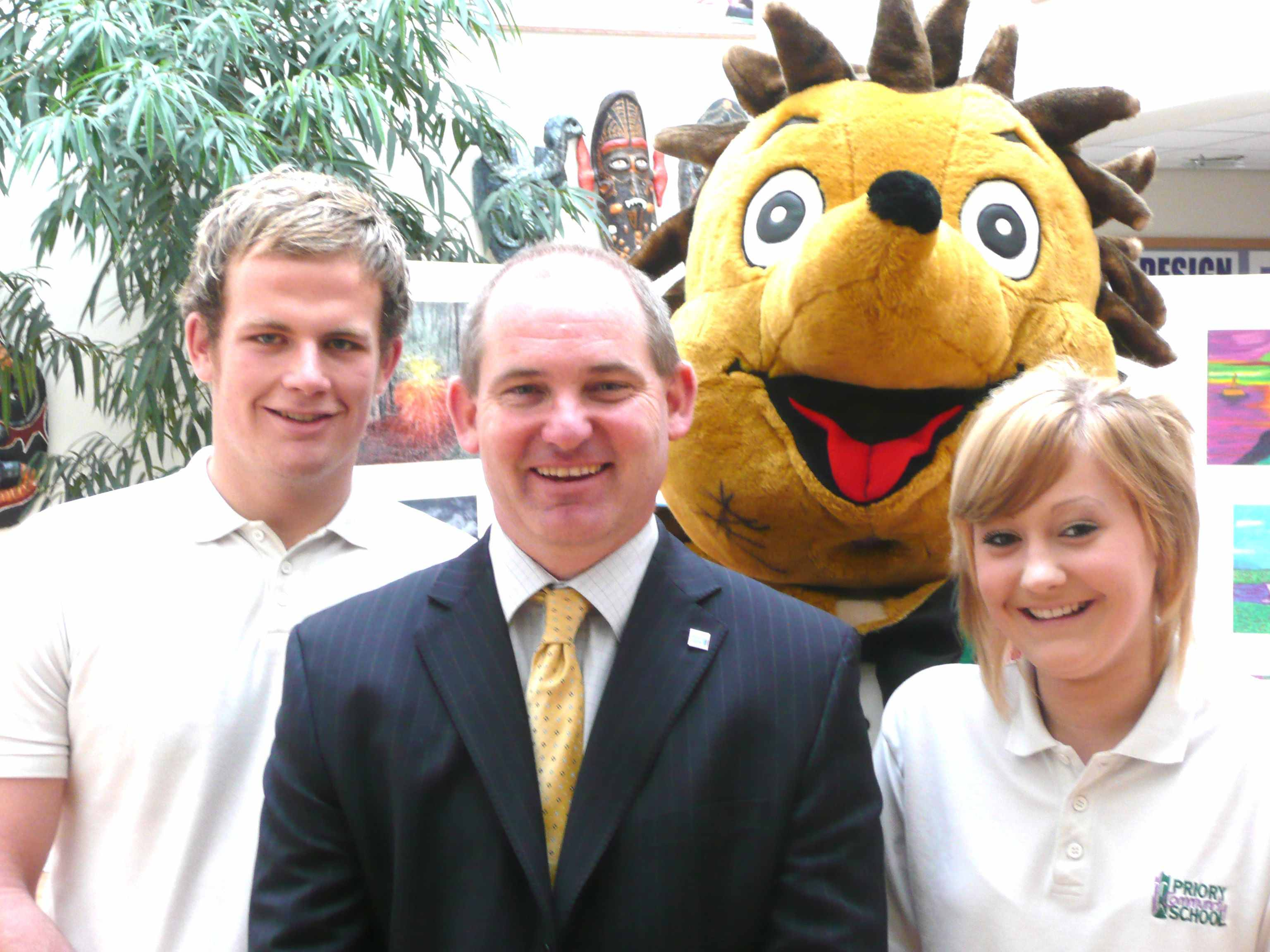
Neville Coles posing for the camera with students and school mascot Percy Priory

Priory Community School - an Academy Trust (often shortened to PCSA) is a coeducational secondary school in Worle, a historical village close to Weston-super-Mare in North Somerset, England.

The school is an Academy that is part of The Pathway Trust, and had 1,264 pupils aged 11 to 16 as of September 2015. Ofsted rated Priory 'outstanding' in all categories in November 2014. Priory converted to an Academy Trust on 17 August 2011

== History and future developments ==
The school was founded in September 1975, and moved to a purpose-built site during autumn 1977. During the 1980s, the school ran an unusual timetable, blocking an entire half-year to take the same subject at the same time. This allowed both setting and mixed-ability teaching in the same subject. This timetable management was the subject of an Open University module and television programme.
