= Worle Town railway station =

Disused railway station in Worle, North Somerset

Coordinates: 51.3593°N 2.9239°W

Worle Town
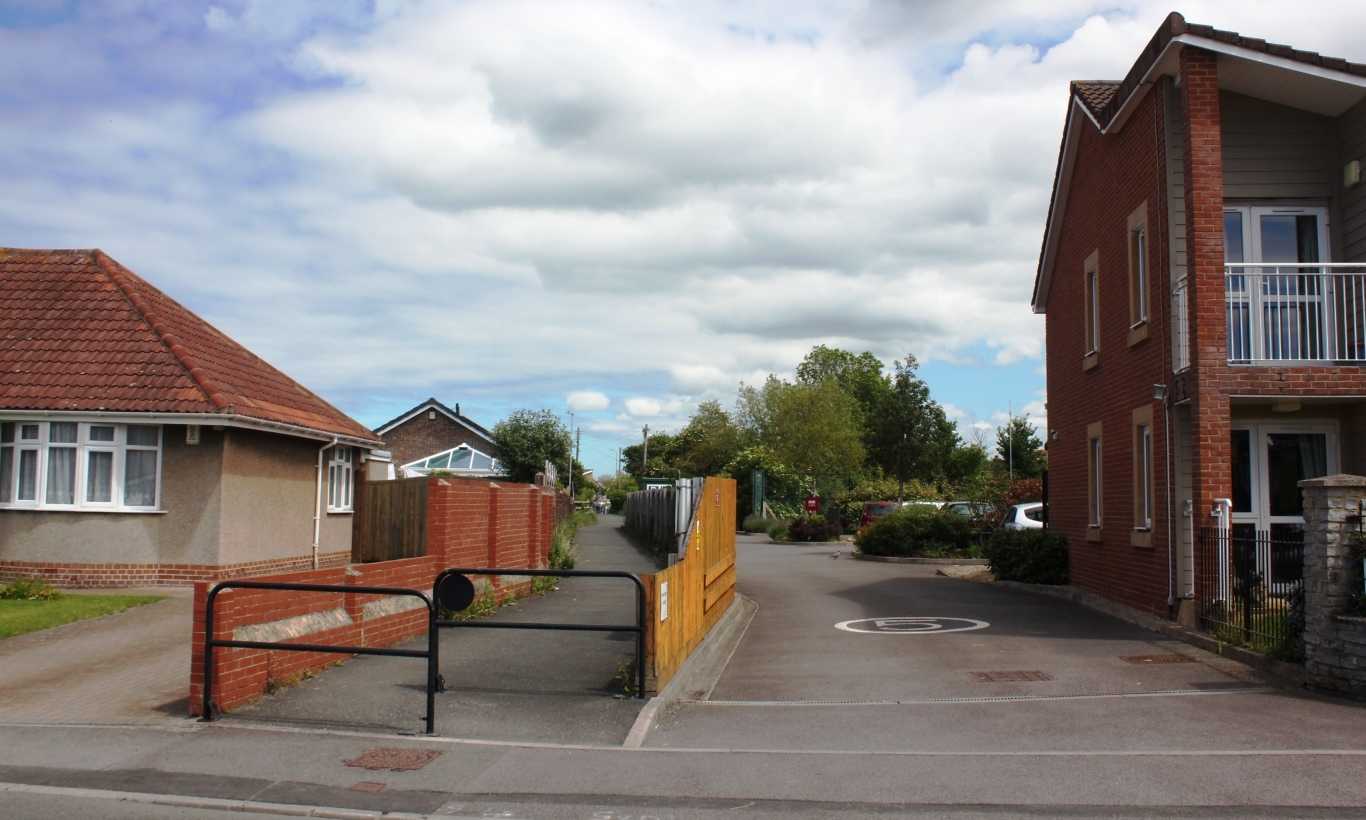
- The site of the station in 2021

General information
- Location: Worle, North Somerset; England

Other information
- Status: Disused

History
- Original company: Weston, Clevedon and Portishead Railway
- Pre-grouping: Weston, Clevedon and Portishead Railway

Key dates
- 1 December 1897: Opened as Worle
- 1913: Name changed to Worle Moor
- 1 November 1917: Name changed to Worle Town
- 20 May 1940: Closed
Location

Worle Town railway station served the village of Worle, North Somerset, England, from 1897 to 1940 on the Weston, Clevedon and Portishead Railway.

== History ==
The station was opened as Worle on 1 December 1897 by the Weston, Clevedon and Portishead Railway. It was one of the few stations to have basic facilities, a ticket office and a waiting room. It also has a siding which served Worle Gas Works until it closed in 1920, a platform which was later removed and an ungated crossing. The station's name was changed to Worle Moor in 1913 and changed to Worle Town on 1 November 1917. It closed on 20 May 1940.

== Accidents ==
Due to the crossing having no gates, several accidents occurred here.

- On 31 August 1903, a train crashed into a wagonette, killing two people and injuring four other people. The cause was driver error.
- A lorry crashed into a carriage in October 1937. One passenger was fatally injured.
- On 7 September 1938, a train ran into a motorcycle. Both men, the one driving the motorcycle and the one in the pillion seat, were killed. This occurred because the motorcyclist had his head turned away from the direction of the oncoming train.

Preceding station	Disused railways	Following station
Ebdon Lane; Line and station closed	Weston, Clevedon and Portishead Railway	Bristol Road; Line and station closed
