= Wraysholme Halt railway station =

Disused railway station in Cumbria, England

Wraysholme Halt

General information
- Location: England
- Coordinates: 54°10′13″N 2°56′55″W
- Grid reference: SD381753
- Platforms: 2

Other information
- Status: Disused

History
- Pre-grouping: Furness Railway

Key dates
- 1911: Opened
- c. 1922: Closed
Location

Wraysholme Halt was a railway station on the Furness Railway in the Furness exclave of Lancashire. Situated between Cark and Cartmel and Kents Bank the halt was not open to the public and was used by the British army's Territorial Force as a railhead for troops training at the Rougholme Rifle Range at nearby Humphrey Head.

== Operational history ==
The Furness Railway opened the halt in 1911 at the request of the local Territorial Force unit. Two timber platforms were erected next to the existing level crossing on Wraysholme Lane. The halt was classified as a non-public timetable station and did not feature in the publicly advertised railway timetable.

In 1916 Vickers Limited proposed building an airship station on the flat area of Flookburgh south of the railway and adjacent to Morecambe Bay. The railway company were asked to install a siding to serve the new works. Approval was given in November 1916 and by May 1917 a siding and controlling signal box had been built. To house the airship station workers an estate was built at what is now Ravenstown and the line was extended to deliver building materials. The Vickers airship station project was abandoned in late 1917 making the railway's latest works redundant and, after lying out of use for some time, the siding and signalling were removed in August 1922.

The end of the First World War reduced the use of the ranges and the halt was last used about 1922.

A proposal to re-open the halt was made by Barrow Borough Council in 1937 but nothing came of the proposal although the remains of the platforms were present until 1960.

== Wraysholme Lane level crossing ==
The level crossing at Wraysholme Lane has been the site of at least two fatal incidents. On 3 August 1906 the body of Furness Railway foreman platelayer James Lewis who lived at the crossing house was found dead on the line. An inquest ruled that he had met an accidental death probably having been hit by a railway engine in the early hours of the morning. On 3 November 2008 Jonathon Crabtree was killed when his car was hit by a train on the crossing - at the time the crossing was ungated of a type known as Automatic Open Crossing Locally monitored (AOCL). As a result of this incident the crossing was converted to a barriered type known as Automatic Open Crossing Locally monitored + Barriers (AOCL+B).
