= Windsor Bridge railway station (Pendleton) =

Disused railway station in Pendleton, Greater Manchester

Windsor Bridge

General information
- Location: Pendleton, Lancashire; England
- Coordinates: 53.4858°N 2.276°W
- Grid reference: SJ817988

Other information
- Status: Disused

History
- Original company: Manchester and Bolton Railway
- Pre-grouping: Manchester and Leeds Railway

Key dates
- 29 May 1838: Opened
- October 1846: Closed
- January 1855: Reopened
- June 1856: Closed
Location

Windsor Bridge railway station served the suburb of Pendleton, historically in Lancashire, England, from 1838 to 1856 on the Manchester and Bolton Railway. On the 1848 OS map, Windsor Bridge is where The Crescent crosses the railway. Today, this is the site of Salford Crescent station.

== History ==
The station was opened on 29 May 1838 by the Manchester and Bolton Railway. Its services were reduced to Wednesdays only in December 1842 and it closed in October 1846. It reopened in January 1855, only to permanently close in June 1856.

== Accidents ==
An accident occurred on 16 October 1839 when an engineer fell off a train before it reached the station.
