= Portishead railway station (WCPR) =

Disused railway station in Portishead, Somerset

Coordinates: 51.4844°N 2.7670°W

Portishead
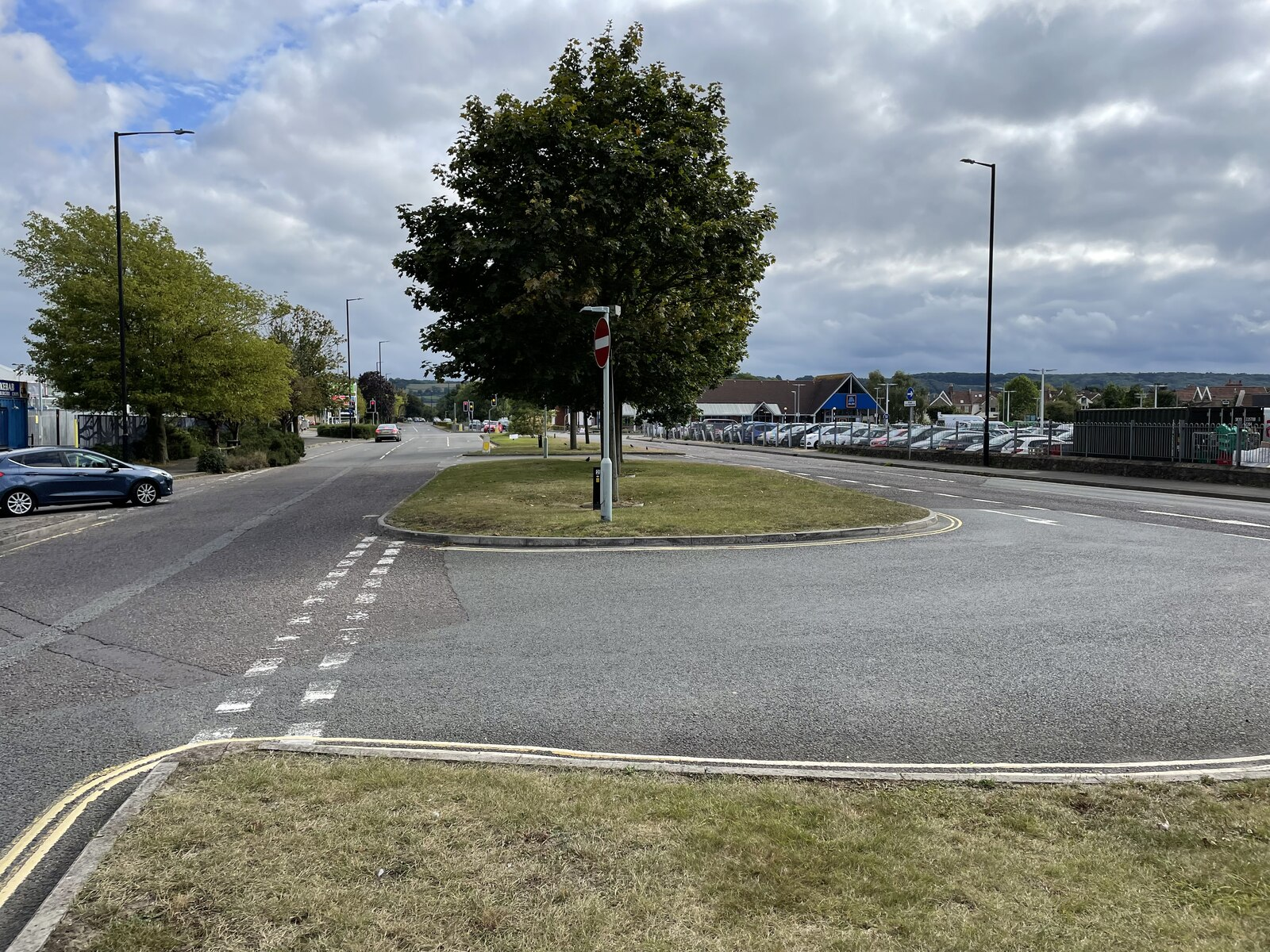
- The site of the station in 2021

General information
- Location: Portishead, Somerset; England
- Platforms: 1 (later added)

Other information
- Status: Disused

History
- Original company: Weston, Clevedon and Portishead Railway
- Pre-grouping: Weston, Clevedon and Portishead Railway

Key dates
- 7 August 1907: Opened
- 20 May 1940: Closed
Location

Portishead railway station served the town of Portishead, Somerset, England from 1907 to 1940 on the Weston, Clevedon and Portishead Railway.

== History ==
The station opened on 7 August 1907 by the Weston, Clevedon and Portishead Railway. There was a private siding that served Mustad's Nail Factory. It originally had no platform but one was built out of stone in 1920. The station closed on 20 May 1940.

Preceding station	Disused railways	Following station
Portishead Pier; Line and station closed	Weston, Clevedon and Portishead Railway	Portishead South; Line and station closed
