= Weston, Clevedon and Portishead Light Railway =

Railway in the South West of England

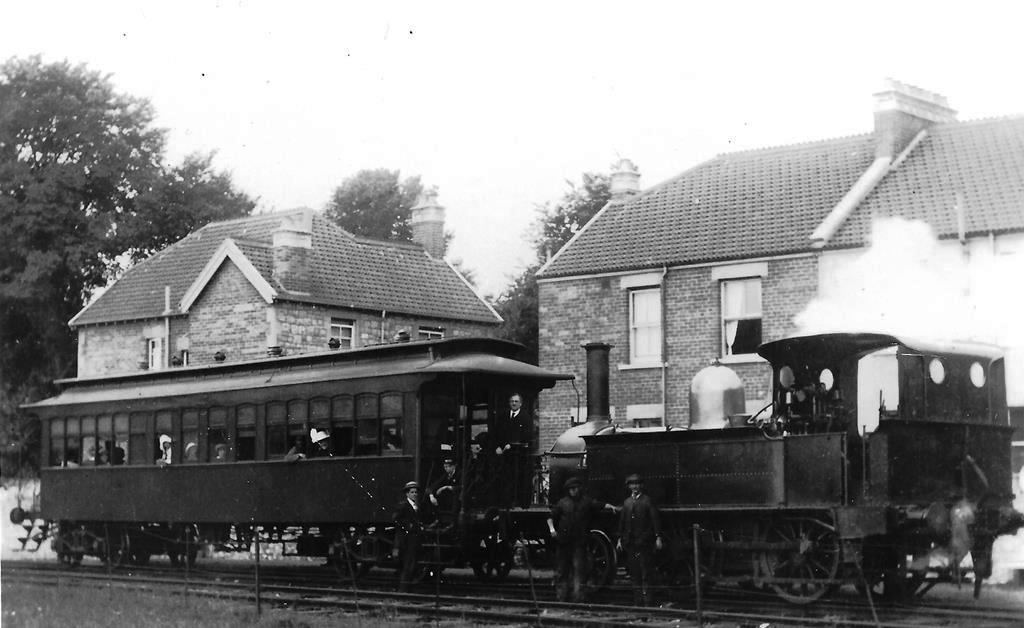
- Hesperus at Weston-super-Mare with one of the 'American' coaches

Overview
- Headquarters: Clevedon
- Locale: England
- Dates of operation: 1897–1940

Technical
- Track gauge: 1,435 mm (4 ft 8 1/2 in) standard gauge
- Length: 14.01 mi (22.55 km)

The Weston, Clevedon and Portishead Light Railway (WC&PR) was a 14.01-mile (22.55 km) standard gauge light railway in Somerset, England. It was conceived as a tramway in the 1880s, opening between the coastal towns of Weston-super-Mare and Clevedon in 1897 and completed to Portishead in 1907. It closed in 1940.

== History ==
=== Construction and opening ===
A broad-gauge railway from Portishead to Clevedon was proposed in 1865 to connect with the Bristol and Portishead Railway which was then under construction. If it had been built it would have allowed direct services from Clevedon to Bristol which would have avoided the need to change at Yatton.

Weston-super-Mare, Clevedon and Portishead Tramways Act 1885
- Act of Parliament
- Parliament of the United Kingdom
- Long title: An Act for incorporating the Weston-super-Mare Clevedon and Portishead Tramways Company and empowering them to construct Tramways and other works in the County of Somerset and for other purposes.
- Citation: 48 & 49 Vict. c. clxxxii

Dates
- Royal assent: 6 August 1885

Other legislation
- Amended by: Weston-super-Mare, Clevedon and Portishead Tramways Act 1890

A new proposal in 1884 envisaged the three towns being linked by a 'Weston-super-Mare, Clevedon and Portishead Tramway'. This standard-gauge line would run along the street from the Boulevard to Ashcombe Road in Weston-super-Mare and then off-road (apart from numerous level crossings) from there to Portishead. An act of Parliament, the Weston-super-Mare, Clevedon and Portishead Tramways Act 1885 (48 & 49 Vict. c. clxxxii) authorising its construction was passed on 6 August 1885.

Weston-super-Mare, Clevedon and Portishead Tramways Act 1890
- Act of Parliament
- Parliament of the United Kingdom
- Long title: An Act to extend the time limited for the completion of the works authorised by the Weston-super-Mare Clevedon and Portishead Tramways Act 1885 and for other purposes.
- Citation: 53 & 54 Vict. c. cxxxii

Dates
- Royal assent: 25 July 1890

Other legislation
- Amends: Weston-super-Mare, Clevedon and Portishead Tramways Act 1885

Text of statute as originally enacted

Weston-super-Mare, Clevedon and Portishead Tramways Act 1892
- Act of Parliament
- Parliament of the United Kingdom
- Long title: An Act to revive the powers granted by the Weston-super-Mare Clevedon and Portishead Tramways Act 1885 with respect to the construction of the Tramways thereby authorised and to authorise the Weston-super-Mare Clevedon and Portishead Tramways Company to construct additional Tramroads and for other purposes.
- Citation: 55 & 56 Vict. c. clviii

Dates
- Royal assent: 27 June 1892

Other legislation
- Amended by: Weston-super-Mare, Clevedon and Portishead Light Railways Act 1899

Building of the Weston-super-Mare to Clevedon section of the tramway began in 1887, but progress was slow due to many legal and financial problems. The act had stipulated that construction should be completed within five years, but further acts had to be passed on 25 July 1890, with the Weston-super-Mare, Clevedon and Portishead Tramways Act 1890 (53 & 54 Vict. c. cxxxii) and again on 27 July 1892 with the Weston-super-Mare, Clevedon and Portishead Tramways Act 1892 (55 & 56 Vict. c. clviii) to extend the time allowed. The section from Ashcombe Road to Clevedon was formally inspected by the Board of Trade on 26 August 1897 but not allowed to open. Due to the long time taken to build the line, some of the wooden sleepers had rotted and needed to be replaced. The local council also complained about the state of the track along the streets in Weston-super-Mare, so this section was taken up. A second inspection was made on 9 November and the line finally opened on 1 December 1897. Instead of the extension to the Boulevard, the Tramway provided horse buses from Ashcombe Road to Birnbeck Pier and the Sanatorium for a few years.

=== Completion to Portishead ===
Weston Clevedon and Portishead Light Railways Act 1899
- Act of Parliament
- Parliament of the United Kingdom
- Long title: An Act to empower the Weston-super-Mare Clevedon and Portishead Tramways Company to construct light railways in the County of Somerset and for other purposes.
- Citation: 62 & 63 Vict. c. ccxxi

Dates
- Royal assent: 9 August 1899

The powers to construct the railway had run out in 1896 so another act of Parliament was required. After some opposition from the Clevedon Urban District Council regarding the necessary level crossings, the Weston Clevedon and Portishead Light Railways Act 1899 (62 & 63 Vict. c. ccxxi) was passed on 9 August 1899. In addition to allowing construction to be completed to Portishead by August 1904, it enabled the tramway to convert to a light railway with the name changed to the Weston, Clevedon and Portishead Light Railway Company.

Financial difficulties continued. By 1904 the company was about £76,000 in debt so a new limited company, the Weston, Clevedon and Portishead Docks Railway, was formed with a capital of £120,000. The new company still found it difficult to raise enough money until September 1905, when £14,500 of 5% debentures were taken up by the Excess Insurance Company. In 1906, it borrowed £16,000 from other sources but was unable to repay the interest so the Excess Insurance Company provided funds up to £15,000 in March 1907 on the condition that the existing directors were replaced by new directors chosen by the insurance company.

With money available again work could be completed on the new line to Portishead. It was inspected on 31 July 1907, and opened for traffic on 7 August.

=== Receivership and closure ===
In 1909, Cuthbert Heath, the managing director of the Excess Insurance Company, petitioned for the railway to enter receivership. Spencer Gore-Browne, one of the directors nominated by the insurance company, was appointed as the receiver and Colonel Stephens, the so-called' 'Light Railway king' was appointed as manager in 1911. He managed the railway along with a number of similar lines from an office in Tonbridge, Kent.

Stephens tried to gain additional business for the line. A small branch was opened at Wick St. Lawrence to serve a wharf which the railway built on the River Yeo; the railway operated some boats carrying coal from Wales for a few years in the 1920s. Two additional passenger halts were opened in 1917-1918 and the larger stations given improved facilities. From 1921, a number of internal combustion railcars and rail-mounted tractors were used which significantly reduced costs. Steam locomotives were retained, especially for the trains from Clevedon to Portishead which conveyed heavy traffic from quarries in the area.

Colonel Stephens died on 23 October 1931 and was replaced as manager by his former assistant W. H. Austen. Spencer Gore-Browne died in 1933 and Cuthbert Heath was running down his involvement as he approached retirement. Gore-Brown had been known to pay some charges out of his own pocket but the new owners and receiver were less kindly disposed to the railway. Receipts were reducing too, and from 1935 some of the traffic from Black Rock Quarry (the largest freight forwarder on the line) was transferred to road haulage.

The company obtained a court order to close the line and the last train ran on 18 May 1940. Shortly after this the Great Western Railway (GWR) purchased the line (but not the land) to use to store wagons loaded with coal that could not be delivered due to the war. The GWR inspected the line on 16 June 1940 but had difficulty in getting one of the Terrier class locomotives to work. They concluded that the bridge across the River Yeo could support a train of six wagons. Some wagons were stored in various sidings at the Weston-super-Mare end of the line but were moved back across the river in case of bombing. The WC&PR rolling stock was all taken to Swindon Works in August 1940 but was scrapped except for two Terriers which were overhauled and retained by the GWR. Lifting the line started on 3 October 1942 from the Weston-super-Mare end using one of the Terriers. By the end of October, the track had been lifted as far as Ebdon Lane. Between February and June 1943, the track was lifted between Portishead and the River Yeo but the remainder had to be removed by road. 16,000 tons of material was recovered.

The company which owned the land no longer existed, so it could not be sold off. The town councils at Weston-super-Mare and Clevedon wanted it for roads and houses so paid the £3,750 value of the land to the Bank of England.

== Description ==
The railway ran through sparsely-populated and level countryside. It was 14.01 miles (22.55 km) long with the steepest gradient being 1 in 68 for about 300 yards (270 m) on the northern side of Clevedon. The only notable engineering work was the bridge across the River Yeo near Wick St. Lawrence, which was 240 feet (73 m) long with cast iron piers supporting steel lattice girders.

The railway was a single track. A passing loop was provided at Wick St Lawrence in 1898 on the Clevedon side of the station, but this fell out of use after 1914. Trains could pass at Clevedon from 1909 when the loop was provided with signals, however the station only had a single platform. When trains needed to pass, the one going to Weston-super-Mare had to reverse out of the station and then pull forward into the loop to allow the second train to enter the platform.

=== Stations ===
There were 19 stations or halts, most of which only had a small shelter and no platform but were merely calling places adjacent to level crossings.

Station name	Town or village	Opened	Miles	Facilities
Weston-super-Mare	Weston-super-Mare	1897	0.00	Ticket office, etc. and goods siding. Platform 10 inches (25 cm) raised to normal height in 1919.
Milton Road	Weston-super-Mare	1897	1.06	Small waiting shelter and a coal siding.
Bristol Road	Weston-super-Mare	1897	1.32	Waiting shelter provided in 1938.
Worle	Worle	1897	1.83	Ticket office, etc. A siding to gas works until 1920. Renamed Worle (Moor Lane) 1913 then Worle Town in 1917.
Ebdon Lane		1897	3.09	Waiting shelter. Milk platform removed in 1930s.
Wick St Lawrence	Wick St. Lawrence	1897	3.80	Small ticket office and waiting room. Passing loop and siding.
Ham Lane	Kingston Seymour	1897	4.93	Waiting shelter, milk platform and siding.
Broadstone		1918	5.25	'Sentry box' shelter.
Kingston Road		1897	5.95	Waiting shelter. Milk platform removed in 1930s.
Colehouse Lane	Clevedon	1897	6.80	Waiting shelter
Clevedon	Clevedon	1897	7.85	Ticket office, etc. with locomotive depot and carriage shed. Platform 10 inches (25 cm) raised to normal height in 1919.
Clevedon East	Clevedon	1907	8.54	Waiting shelter
Clevedon All Saints	Clevedon	1927	8.71	None
Walton Park	Walton in Gordano	1907	9.23	Waiting shelter with sidings to quarries.
Walton in Gordano	Walton in Gordano	1907	9.92	Waiting shelter, siding with cattle pens.
Cadbury Road	Weston in Gordano	1907	11.42	Waiting shelter and siding
Clapton Road	Clapton in Gordano	1907	12.80	None
Portishead South	Portishead	1907	13.36	Waiting shelter and siding
Portishead	Portishead	1907	14.01	Ticket office, etc. and private siding for nail factory. Platform built in 1920.

There were also several sidings handling freight traffic:

A short branch was opened in 1915 at Wick St. Lawrence to serve a jetty which the railway company built on the River Yeo. There was a loop on the branch from which a single line ran out onto the jetty which had a concrete platform supported by wooden piles.

Public goods facilities in Clevedon were provided at Parnell Road where there was a siding with a platform made from old wagon underframes. From here another short branch served the town's gas works. There was also a private siding near the Tickenham Road for Mr Shoplands but this closed in about 1920. All these were between the station and the Portishead side of town.

Conygar Quarry was served by a long siding from Walton Park station. There were more quarries in the Gordano Valley. Black Rock was the largest and had a double loop line in 1919 but more sidings were added in 1931. Nightingale Quarry had its own siding near Black Rock. In 1937, the Conygar Quarry transported 3,968 tons by rail and the other two moved 34,755 tons.

=== Connecting lines ===
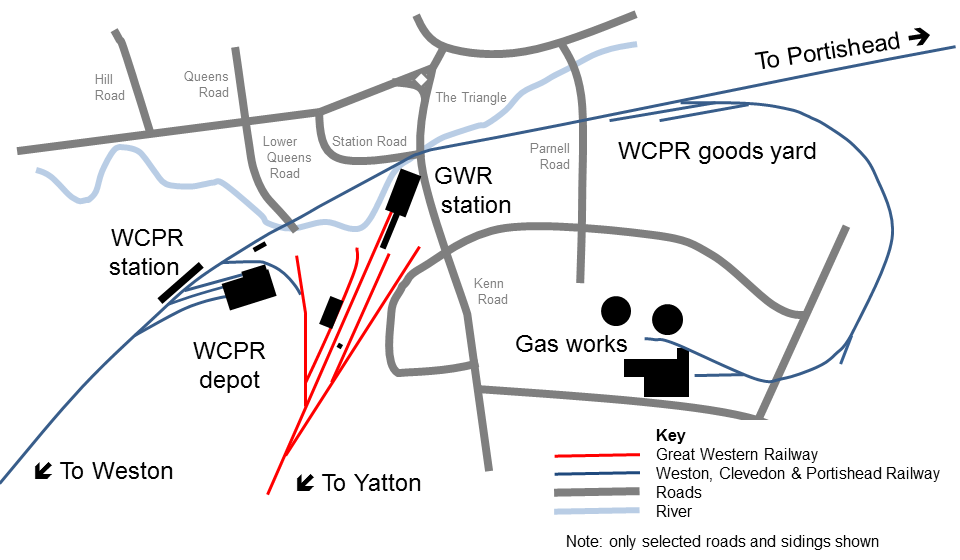
The WC&PR (blue) and GWR (red) stations in Clevedon were only a short distance apart

There was no connection with other railways when the line opened in 1897. A connection was made at Clevedon in 1898 when a tightly curved line (of 130 feet (40 m) radius) was laid behind the engine shed to connect with the GWR's goods yard. 0-6-0 locomotives ran with one pair of wheels uncoupled, making them 0-4-0s, so they could negotiate the tight curve of this line.

The 1892 Act of Parliament to allow completion of the line also authorised connections to be built to the GWR at both Portishead and Weston-Super-Mare. The Portishead connection was brought into use on 2 November 1908 after which the connection at Clevedon was seldom used. The connection near Milton was never built, instead a 'Weston-Super-Mare Junction Light Railway' was proposed to take a line to Locking Road where it would connect with the Weston-super-Mare & District Tramway near their depot. It was hoped that coal traffic could be taken to the tramway company's depot and a nearby pottery, while tram cars from the sea front could reach the WC&PR. The Light Railway Commissioners refused approval for the connection to the depot and the lines were never built.

== Rolling stock ==
Most of the locomotives and rolling stock were bought second-hand from various sources, making a varied collection.

=== Steam locomotives ===
Number	Name	Type	Builder	Built	To WC&PR	Withdrawn	Former railway and notes
—	Harold	0-6-0ST	Kitson	1872	1897	1898	
—	Clevedon	0-6-0T	Walker Brothers	?	1897	1898	
—	Clevedon	2-2-2WT	Sharp Stewart	1857	1898	1904?	Furness Railway
—	Weston	2-2-2WT	Sharp Stewart	1866	1898	1906	Furness Railway
—	Portishead	0-6-0T	Robert Stephenson	1887	1898	1901	
1	Clevedon	2-4-0T	Dübs	1879	1901	1940	Jersey Railway
—	Emlyn No. 82	0-6-0ST	Kitson	?	1903?	1907	
—	—	2-4-0T	Sharp Stewart	1872	1903	1906	London, Brighton and South Coast Railway
—	Emlyn No. 96	0-6-0ST	Black, Hawthorn	?	1905?	1905	
3	Weston	0-6-0ST	Manning Wardle	1881	1906	1940	
2	Portishead	0-6-0ST	Manning Wardle	1890	1907	1926	
4	Walton Park	0-6-0ST	Hudswell, Clarke	1908	1908	1912	WC&PR's first "new" locomotive
4	Hesperus	2-4-0T	Sharp Stewart	1876	1911	1937	W&PRR/Great Western Railway
2	Northiam	2-4-0T	Hawthorn Leslie	1899	1917?	1921	On loan from Kent and East Sussex Railway
5	—	0-6-0ST	Manning Wardle	1919	1919	1940	
2	Portishead	0-6-0T	LBSCR	1877	1925	1940	LBSCR/Southern Railway
4	—	0-6-0T	LBSCR	1875	1937	1940	LBSCR/Southern Railway

=== Internal combustion ===
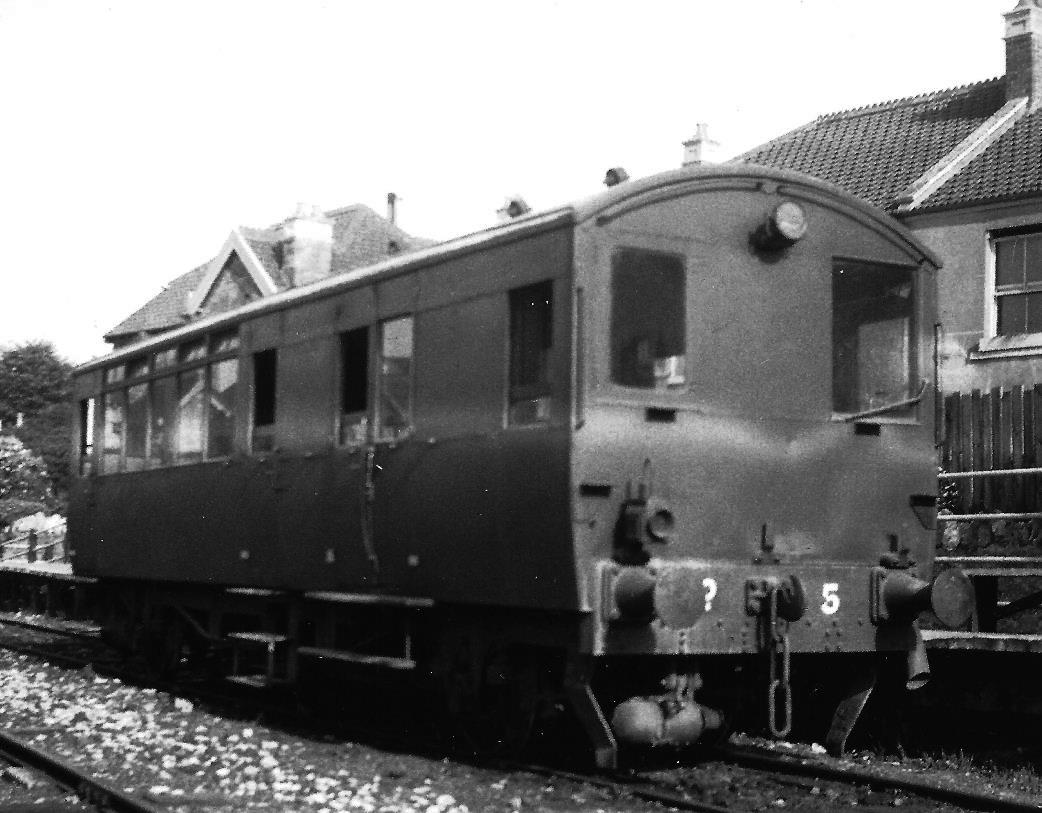
Railcar number 5

Number	Type	Builder	Built	To WC&PR	Withdrawn	Former railway and notes
—	Tractor	Muir-Hill	1921	1921	1926	
—	Railcar	Drewry	1921	1921	1940	
—	Trailer	Drewry	1923	1923	1940	
—	Tractor	Muir-Hill	1926	1926	1940	
5	Railcar	Drewry	1928	1934	1940	Southern Railway

=== Carriages and wagons ===
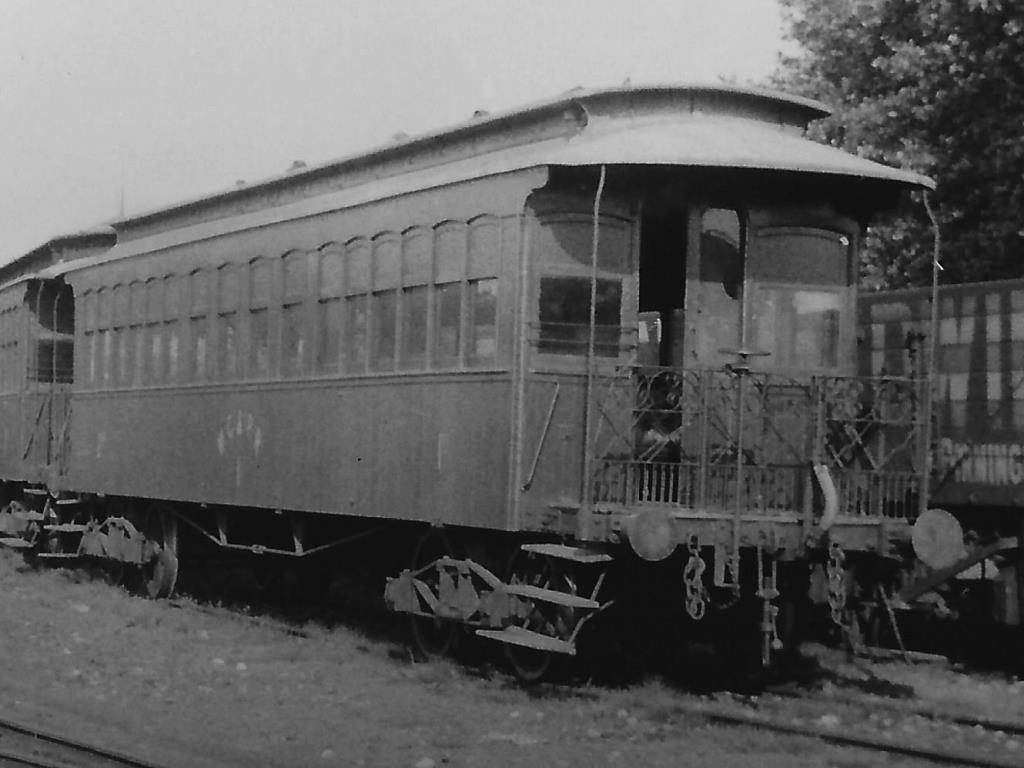
One of the American bogie cars

The line had six 'cars' when it opened in 1897. These were bogie carriages, 49 feet 3 inches (15.01 m) long over their buffers with American-style open end platforms and both first and second class seating. They had been built by the Lancaster Carriage and Wagon Works for the Argentine Republic Railway but the sale to that company was never completed. They were taken out of service in the early 1920s, but three saw further use from 1937 until the line closed. An additional coach was later bought from the Great Central Railway, a small four-wheel vehicle used as a 'smoking car' during the summer. It had been renumbered into the freight stock series by 1913 and its underframe was stored in the siding at Wick St Lawrence.

Seven former Metropolitan Railway four-wheeled coaches were put into service in 1907, six of them close-coupled in pairs. The pairs were 43 feet 8 inches (13.31 m) long. Coach number 7 has been restored to its Metropolitan Railway condition. A four-wheeled Great Eastern Railway passenger brake van arrived in 1911 but was withdrawn in 1922. Three London and South Western Railway four-wheeled coaches arrived in 1924 and were close-coupled as a set although sometimes ran without the centre coach. The final coach was a former Taff Vale Railway four-wheeled coach which could be used on its own on quiet days.

In 1901 there were only two freight wagons, but by 1907 this had increased to nine, and another nine arrived the following year. When the line closed there were 27 wagons in all. These were mostly former Midland Railway open wagons of between 6 and 10 long tons (6,100 and 10,200 kg) capacity, but there was also a low machinery wagon, a box van and a goods brake van.

== The line today ==
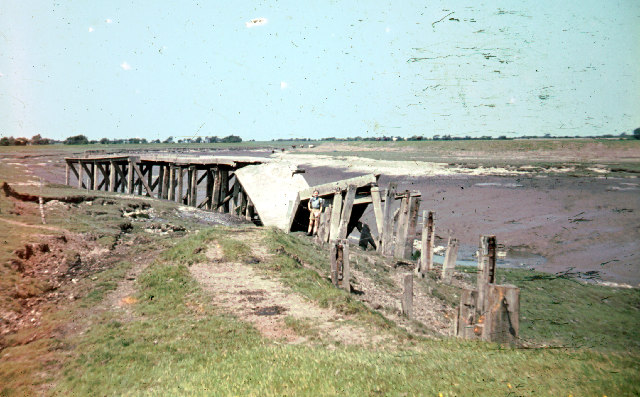
The remains of the wharf at Wick St. Lawrence seen in 1963

Due to the lack of major infrastructure, there are few obvious remains of the line. Still surviving is a small bridge over a rhyne in Portishead, the remains of a bridge over the River Yeo, and the wharf. Much of the route of the track bed survives, a small part of which can be walked on Weston Moor reserve in the Gordano Valley. There are plans to convert some of the track bed to a cycle path as part of the National Cycle Network.

The WC&P Railway Group was formed in November 2006, to attempt to preserve what was left of the railway.
