= Preston Street railway station =

Former railway station in England

Preston Street Newtown
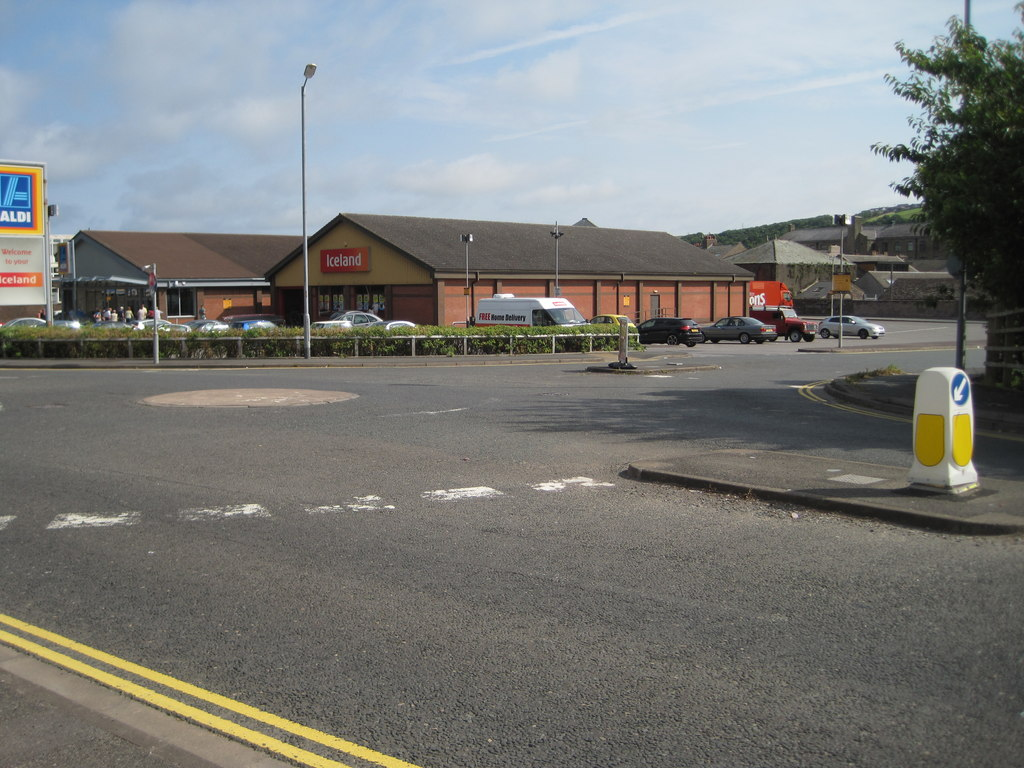
- The site of the station in 2013

General information
- Location: Whitehaven, Cumberland; England
- Coordinates: 54°32′29″N 3°35′24″W
- Grid reference: NX97251770

Other information
- Status: Disused

History
- Original company: Whitehaven & Furness Junction
- Pre-grouping: Furness Railway
- Post-grouping: London, Midland & Scottish Railway

Key dates
- 19 July 1849: Opened
- December 1855: Closed to passengers
- 19 May 1969: Closed for goods
- 5 June 1972: Re-opened as coal depot
- c. 1995: Closed
Location

Preston Street railway station (also known as Newtown) was a railway station in Whitehaven, Cumbria, England.

Opened in July 1849 the station was the original terminus in Whitehaven of the Whitehaven & Furness Junction Railway (W&FJ).

The station was situated approximately 1,000 yards (914 m) south of the Whitehaven Junction Railway's terminus at Bransty (the current Whitehaven station). It was not until 1852 that a connecting line between the Whitehaven & Furness Junction's mainline from the south and the Whitehaven Junction's line from the north was made; this line did not pass through Preston Street but instead the W&FJ opened a new station at Corkickle. A goods connection between the two termini did exist but involved reversing trains and using the numerous goods and colliery lines around Whitehaven harbour and on the streets of Whitehaven.

In 1854 the two companies agreed to pool rolling stock and resources and concentrate all passenger traffic in Whitehaven at Bransty station and all goods traffic at Preston Street; this reorganisation started in December 1855 and was noted as complete in February 1856.

This remained the situation until 1969 when with freight revenues declining Preston Street was closed. In 1972 the site reopened as a coal depot. By the mid-1990s coal production in the Whitehaven area had ceased and all the pits closed and what traffic there was in coal was transferred to road transport with the final closure of Preston Street.
