= Worle Community School =

Worle Community School Academy

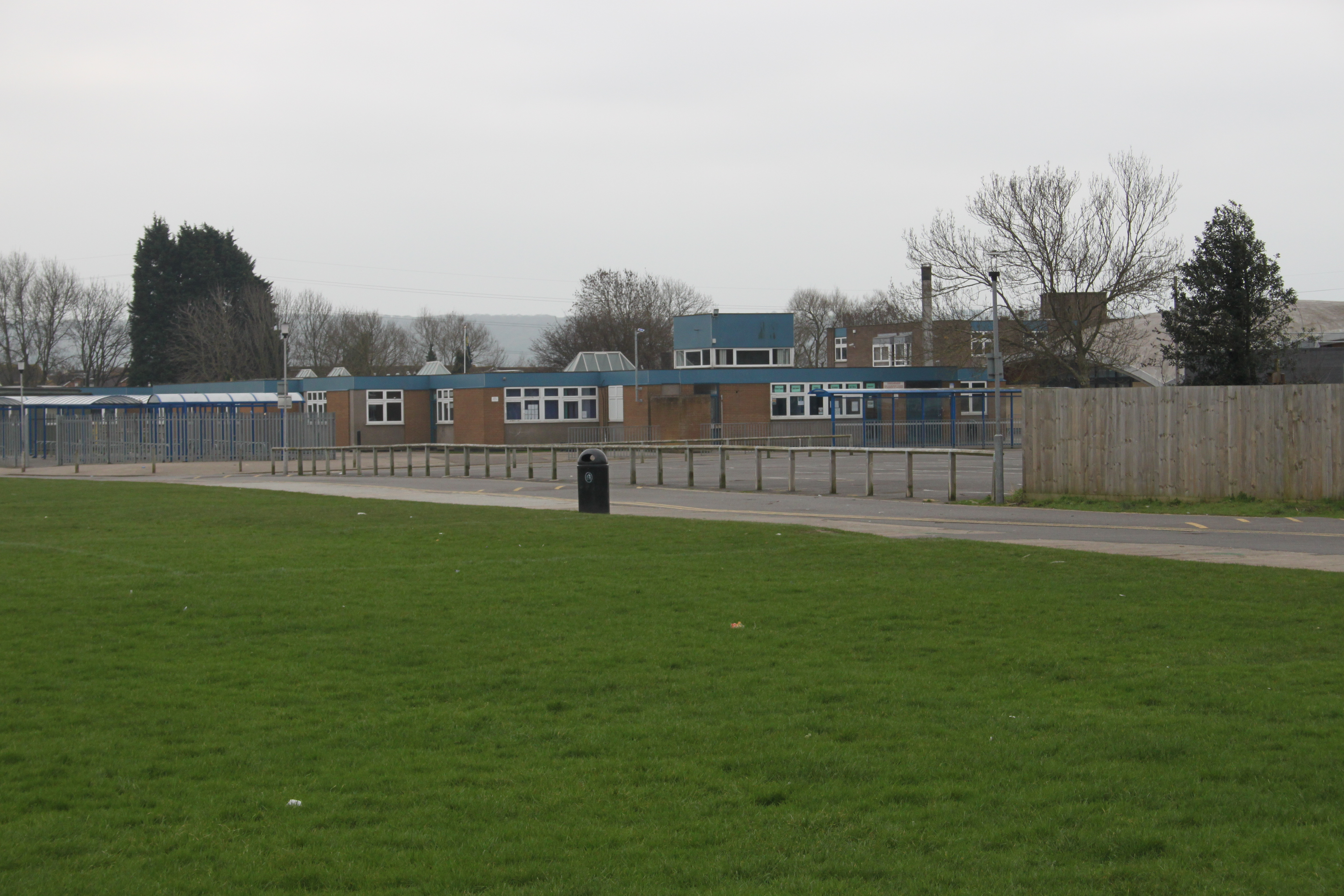

Location
- Redwing Drive; Worle, North Somerset, BS22 8XX; England; 51.3551°N 2.9289°W

Information
- Type: Academy
- Motto: PROUD
- Established: 1948
- Local authority: North Somerset
- Trust: The Priory Learning Trust
- Department for Education URN: 143137 Tables
- Ofsted: Reports
- Principal: Mark Tidman
- Executive headteacher: Will Roberts
- Gender: Mixed
- Age: 11 to 16
- Enrolment: 1,348
- Colours: Navy blue and Sky blue
- Website: https://www.worle-school.org.uk

Worle Community School - an Academy (often shortened to WCSA) is a coeducational secondary school academy located in Worle, a suburb of Weston-super-Mare in North Somerset, England.

There are currently 1,348 students aged 11 to 16 in the school.

The school received media attention in early 2016 after a student was stabbed. Shortly after, an Ofsted inspection revealed the school to perform inadequately in every aspect, resulting being placed into special measures. In order to increase the school's performance, on March 1, 2017, Worle Community School became an academy as part of The Priory Learning Trust.

== Exam results ==
In the academic year 2022/2023, the school's Progress 8 benchmark score was -0.55 which was well below average compared to the North Somerset average score of -0.02 and compared to the England average which was -0.03. The school's Attainment 8 score was 38.2, lower than North Somerset's Attainment 8 score of 46.4 and the England average which was 46.2.

The percentage of pupils who achieved grade 5 or above in English and maths GCSEs was 32%, lower compared to the North Somerset percentage of 44% and also lower compared to the England average of 45%.

== Notable alumni ==
- Richard Kingscote, professional jockey. Won 2022 Derby on Desert Crown.
- Jill Dando, journalist and broadcaster, was a student at the school until 1978.
