= Worle =

Village in Somerset, England

Coordinates: 51.3578°N 2.9277°W

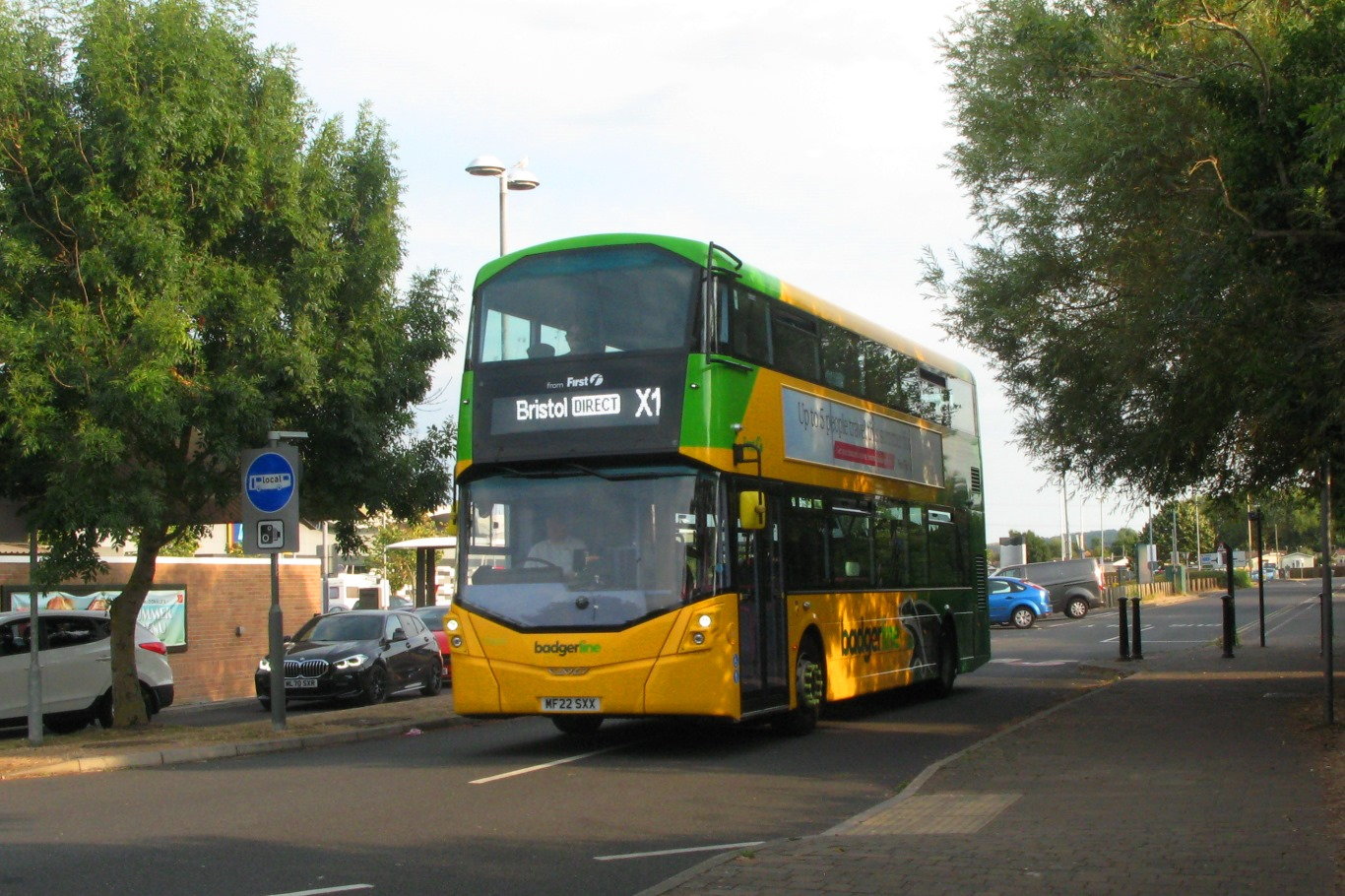
- Bus hub in Worle, 2022.

- Location within Somerset
- OS grid reference: ST355625
- Civil parish: Weston-Super-Mare
- Unitary authority: North Somerset
- Ceremonial county: Somerset
- Region: South West
- Country: England
- Sovereign state: United Kingdom
- Post town: WESTON-SUPER-MARE
- Postcode district: BS22
- Dialling code: 01934
- Police: Avon and Somerset
- Fire: Avon
- Ambulance: South Western
- UK Parliament: Weston-super-Mare

Worle (/wɜːrl/ WURL) is a village in the civil parish of Weston-super-Mare, in the North Somerset district, in the ceremonial county of Somerset, England. It is joined to the seaside town of Weston-super-Mare on its western edge. It, however, maintains a very separate identity, and may now be bigger than its more famous neighbour. Worle pre-dates Weston and was mentioned in the Domesday Book of 1086. In the book, it is said that Worle was owned by Walter of Douai, and consisted of 750 acres (3.0 km^{2}) and valued at 6.5 hides. "Walter of Douai holds of the King, Worle. Edgar held it in the time of King Edward, and gelded for six hides and a half." The parish church of St Martin's sits on the side of Worlebury Hill and overlooks the village. It has a local sports club located on the highstreet called Worle Football club.

== History ==
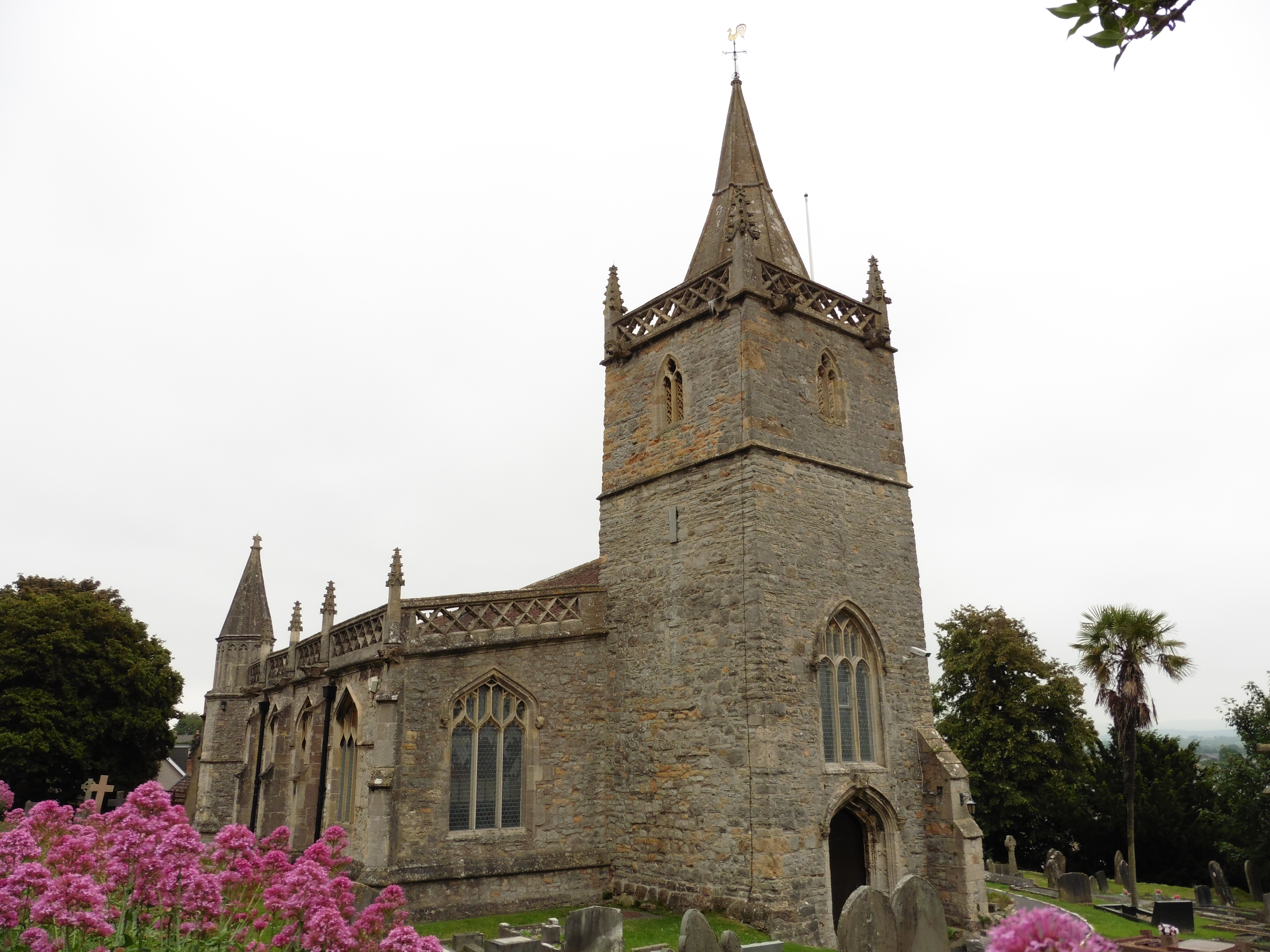
St Martin's Church in Worle

The name was possibly formed from the Old English Wor + leah meaning 'wood or clearing frequented by grouse', or perhaps 'moor meadow'. The parish was part of the Winterstoke Hundred.

Worle has grown dramatically in the last 50 years. That initial development in the 1970s and 1980s included a large number of houses, a Sainsburys supermarket, a secondary school and an ecumenical church (St Marks). However, in recent years a larger range of facilities and amenities have opened up, including large stores, shops, a medical centre, a railway station and additional churches. Weston-super-Mare's Magistrates Court has relocated to Worle. It also has a number of active groups and societies including a Lions club.

St Martin's Church was built in 1125 and rebuilt during the 14th and 15th centuries, with major restoration and extension work in 1870. The Church is now ecumenical, with Methodist as well as Church of England ministers. It is a Grade II* listed building.

The ancient parish of Worle became a civil parish in 1866. The civil parish was abolished on 1 April 1933, when most of the parish was absorbed into Weston-super-Mare. Smaller areas of the parish joined Kewstoke and Locking. In 1931 the parish had a population of 1995.

The Weston & Somerset Mercury is the local newspaper.

== Transport ==
Worle is located close to junction 21 of the M5 motorway. Bristol is approximately 20 miles (32 km) away and can be accessed by the M5 or A370 road.

There have been four different stations serving Worle since the Bristol and Exeter Railway opened on 14 June 1841. For most of this time, the station generally known as Puxton and Worle railway station has served, despite being situated in St Georges. From 1 March 1884 until 2 January 1922 a more convenient Worle station was provided on the Loop Line. Puxton and Worle closed on 6 April 1964.

There was also a Worle Town station situated much closer to the High Street but only served by the Weston, Clevedon and Portishead Railway from 1897 to 1940.

The present-day Worle railway station is situated midway between the two former sites and was opened on 24 September 1990. Since 2008 longer express trains have been allowed to stop at Worle's short platform with the express train opening the doors of up to 4 coaches. This has enabled passengers from Worle to travel to London and all the stops in-between. Before most people had to change at either Weston-super-Mare railway station or Bristol Temple Meads railway station.

Worle has bus connections running every ten minutes into the centre of Weston-super-Mare and bus routes to Bristol and other locations, which is adjacent to the local McDonalds and Sainsburys supermarket, the buses that serve this are: X1, X5, A3, 6, 7, 9 & 611.

Service number	Route	Operator
X1	Weston-super-Mare, Asda Store - Bristol Bus Station	First Bus
X5/X5x	Weston-super-Mare - Worle - Clevedon - Portishead	First Bus
X11/X11x	Weston-super-Mare - West Wick - Yatton - Clevedon - Nails	First Bus
A3	Weston-super-Mare - Bristol Airport	First Bus
6	Weston-super-Mare - Worle	First Bus
7	Locking Parklands - Worle	First Bus
9	Weston-super-Mare - Worlebury - Worle	First Bus
611	Worle - Bridgewater College - Rodway	First Bus

== Education ==
Worle includes two secondary schools, Worle Community School Academy and Priory Community School Academy, and several primary schools, including Becket Primary School, Mendip Green First School, Worle Village Primary, St Martin's Primary, Mead Vale Primary School, Herons' Moor Academy, Castle Batch Primary School and St Mark's Primary School.

Mendip Green Primary School is one of the largest primary schools in the area, with 407 children of 4 – 8 years of age (2008). Mendip Green was one of the first schools in North Somerset achieving Healthy School Status, also it has Leading aspect Award, and a hearing and language resource base.
