= List of closed railway stations in Great Britain: C =

The list of closed railway stations in Great Britain includes the following: Year of closure is given if known. Stations reopened as heritage railways continue to be included in this list and some have been linked. Some stations have been reopened to passenger traffic. Some lines remain in use for freight and mineral traffic.

== Ca ==
Station (Town, unless in station name)	Rail company	Year closed	Notes
Cadbury Road	Weston, Clevedon and Portishead Railway	1940	
Cadeleigh	GWR	1963	
Cadishead (1st)	Cheshire Lines Committee	1895	
Cadishead (2nd)	Cheshire Lines Committee	1964	
Cadmores Lane (Cheshunt)	Northern and Eastern Railway	1842	
Cadoxton Terrace Halt	GWR	1962	
Cae Harris (Dowlais)	Rhymney Railway	1964	
Caerau	GWR	1970	
Caerleon	GWR	1962	
Caernarvon	L&NWR	1970	
Caernarvon (Morfa)	Carnarvon and Llanberis Railway	1871	
Caernarvon (Pant)	Carnarvonshire Railway	1871	
Caersws (Van Railway)	Van Railway/Cambrian Railways	1879	
Caerwys	L&NWR	1962	
Caffyns Halt	Lynton & Barnstaple Railway	1935	
Cairnbulg	GNR	1965	
Cairneyhill	NBR	1930	
Cairnhill Bridge	Monklands Railway	1850	
Cairnie Junction	GNSR	1968	
Cairntable Halt	LM&SR	1950	
Caister Camp Halt	M&GNJR	1959	
Caister-on-Sea	M&GNJR	1959	
Calbourne & Shalfleet (Isle of Wight)	Freshwater, Yarmouth and Newport Railway	1953	
Calcots	GNSR	1968	
Caldarvan	NBR	1934	
Calder	Caledonian Railway	1943	
Calderbank	Caledonian Railway	1930	
Caldercruix	NBR	1956	reopened 2011
Calderpark Halt (Glasgow Zoo, Broomhouse)	British Rail	1955	
Calderwood Glen Platform (near East Kilbride)	Caledonian Railway	1939	
Caldon Low Halt	North Staffordshire Railway	1935	
Caldwell (latterly named Uplawmoor)	Glasgow, Barrhead and Kilmarnock Joint Railway	1966	
Caldy	Chester and Birkenhead Railway	1954	
California Halt	M&GNJR	1959	
Callander (1st)	Caledonian Railway	1870	
Callander (2nd)	Caledonian Railway	1965	
Callerton	NER	1929	
Callington	Plymouth, Devonport and South Western Junction Railway	1966	
Calne	GWR	1965	
Calthwaite	LNWR	1952	
Calveley	LNWR	1960	
Calverley and Rodley	Midland Railway	1965	
Calvert	Great Central Railway	1963	
Cam	Midland Railway	1962	
Camber Sands	Rye & Camber Tramway	1939	
Camberwell	London, Chatham and Dover Railway	1916	
Cambus	NBR	1968	
Cambus o' May Halt	GNSR	1966	
Cambusavie Platform	Highland Railway	1960	
Cambusnethan	Caledonian Railway	1917	
Camden	London and Birmingham Railway	1852	
Camden Road	Midland Railway	1916	
Camelford	LSWR	1966	
Camels Head Halt	LSWR	1942	
Cameron Bridge	NBR	1969	New station opened 2024
Camerton (Cumberland – now Cumbria)	LNWR	1952	
Camerton (Somerset)	GWR	1925	
Camerton Colliery Halt	Cleator and Workington Junction Railway	1923	
Camp Hill (1st)	Midland Railway	1841	
Camp Hill (2nd)	Midland Railway	1941	
Campbeltown	Campbeltown and Machrihanish Light Railway	1932	
Campsie Glen	NBR	1951	
Canada Dock	LNWR	1941	
Canada Dock	Liverpool Overhead Railway	1956	
Canal Side (Neath)	Rhondda and Swansea Bay Railway	1935	
Canning	Liverpool Overhead Railway	1956	
Cannock	LNWR	1965	reopened 1989
Cannon Street (Hull)	Hull and Barnsley Railway	1924	
Cannon Street Road	London and Blackwall Railway	1848	
Canonbie	NBR	1964	
Canterbury North Lane	Canterbury and Whitstable Railway	1846	
Canterbury Road (Wingham)	East Kent Light Railway	1948	
Canterbury South	South Eastern Railway (UK)	1940	
Cape Platform	GWR	1936	
Capel	GER	1932	
Capel Celyn Halt	GWR	1960	
Caradog Falls Halt	GWR	1964	
Carcroft and Adwick-le-Street	West Riding and Grimsby Railway	1967	
Cardiff Adam Street	Rhymney Railway	1871	
Cardiff Clarence Road	Great Western Railway	1964	
Cardiff Parade	Rhymney Railway	1928	
Cardiff Road (Mountain Ash)	GWR	1964	
Cardigan	GWR	1962	
Cardington	MR	1962	
Cardington Workmen's Platform	MR	1921	
Cardonnel Halt	GWR	1936	
Cardrona	NBR	1962	
Careston	Caledonian Railway	1952	
Cargill	Caledonian Railway	1956	
Cargo Fleet	North Eastern Railway	1990	
Carham	NER	1955	
Carisbrooke	Freshwater, Yarmouth and Newport Railway	1953	
Carlinghow	London and North Western Railway	1917	
Carliol Square (Newcastle upon Tyne)	York, Newcastle and Berwick Railway	1850	
Carlisle Bogfield	Maryport and Carlisle Railway	1844	
Carlisle Canal	North British Railway	1864	
Carlisle Crown Street	Maryport and Carlisle Railway	1849	
Carlisle London Road	North Eastern Railway	1863	
Carlton Towers	Hull and Barnsley Railway	1932	
Carlton on Trent	GNR	1953	
Carmarthen Junction	GWR	1926	
Carmont	Caledonian Railway	1956	
Carmyle	Caledonian Railway	1964	reopened 1993
Carmyllie	Dundee and Arbroath Railway	1929	
Carn Brea	West Cornwall Railway	1961	
Carnaby	NER	1970	
Carnarvon Castle	Nantlle Railway	1865	
Carnarvon (Pant)	Carnarvonshire Railway	1871	
Carnbroe	Wishaw and Coltness Railway	1846	
Carnforth	Furness and Midland Joint Railway	1880	
Carno	Cambrian Railways	1965	
Carnwath	Caledonian Railway	1966	
Carr House	NER	1868	
Carr Lane	Knott End Railway	1930	
Carr Mill	LNWR	1917	
Carreghofa Halt	GWR	1965	
Carrington	GCR	1928	
Carrog	GWR	1964	reopened by Llangollen Rly Society
Carron	GNSR	1965	
Carronbridge	GSWR	1953	
Carsbreck	Caledonian Railway	1935	approximate date
Carterhatch Lane Halt	GER	1919	
Carter's Crossing Halt	North Staffordshire Railway	1921	
Carterton	GWR	1962	
Carville	NER	1973	
Cashes Green Halt	GWR	1964	
Cassillis	GSWR	1954	
Cassington Halt	GWR	1962	
Castle Ashby and Earls Barton	LNWR	1964	
Castle Bromwich	MR	1968	
Castle Bytham	Midland Railway	1959	
Castle Donington and Shardlow	MR	1930	
Castle Douglas	GSWR	1965	
Castle Douglas St Andrew Street	GSWR	1867	
Castle Eden	NER	1952	
Castle Grant Platform	Highland Railway	1949	
Castle Howard	NER	1930	
Castle Kennedy	Portpatrick and Wigtownshire Joint Railway	1965	
Castle Mill	Glyn Valley Tramway	1933	
Castle Stuart Platform	Highland Railway	1938	
Castlebythe Halt	GWR	1937	
Castlecary (Strathclyde)	NBR	1967	
Castleford Cutsyke	L&YR	1968	
Castlethorpe	LNWR	1964	
Castor	LNWR	1957	
Catcliffe	LD&ECR	1939	
Catfield	M&GNJR	1959	
Caton	MR	1961	
Catrine	GSWR	1943	
Catterick Bridge	North Eastern Railway	1969	
Catterick Camp	Catterick Military Railway	1964	
Cattistock Halt	GWR	1966	
Cauldcots	NBR	1930	
Causeway	Bideford, Westward Ho! and Appledore Railway	1917	
Causeway End (Central)	NBR	1930	
Causeway End (Dumfries and Galloway)	Portpatrick and Wigtownshire Joint Railway	1885	
Causewayhead (Cumberland)	Carlisle and Silloth Bay Railway	1859	
Causewayhead (NBR)	NBR	1955	
Cavendish	GER	1967	
Cawood	NER	1930	
Cawston	GER	1952	
Caythorpe	GNR	1962	
Cayton	NER	1952	

== Ce ==
Station (Town, unless in station name)	Rail company	Year closed	Notes
Caersws	Van Railway	1879	
Cefn	GWR	1960	
Cefn Coed	Brecon and Merthyr Railway/LNWR Joint Railway	1961	
Cefn Coed Colliery Halt	GWR	1962	
Cefn Crib	Newport, Abergavenny and Hereford Railway	1860	
Cefn Onn Halt	Rhymney Railway	1986	
Cefntilla Halt	British Railways	1955	
Ceint	LNWR	1930	
Celynen North Halt	GWR	1962	
Celynen South Halt	GWR	1962	
Cement Mills Halt	Isle of Wight Central Railway	1966	
Cemetery Gates (Hull)	NER	1854	
Cemmaes	Mawddwy Railway	1931	
Cemmes Road	Cambrian Railways	1965	
Central (London)	Eastern Counties Railway	1940	
Central Croydon	LB&SCR	1890	
Cerist	Van Railway	1879	

== Ch ==
Station (Town, unless in station name)	Rail company	Year closed	Notes
Chacewater	GWR	1964	
Chalcombe Road Halt	GCR	1956	
Chalder	West Sussex Railway	1935	
Chalford	GWR	1964	
Chalk Farm (1st)	L&NWR	1872	
Chalk Farm (2nd)	L&NWR	1915	
Challow	GWR	1964	
Chalvey Halt	GWR	1930	
Chambers Crossing Halt	GWR	1916	
Chandlers Ford	LSWR	1969	reopened 2003
Chapel Bridge	Monmouth Railway	1876	
Chapel Lane	Shropshire and Montgomeryshire Railway	1933	
Chapel Street (Prestatyn)	LNWR	1930	
Chapelhall	Caledonian Railway	1930	
Chapeltown Central	GCR	1953	
Chapel-en-le-Frith Central	MR	1967	
Chard Central (Chard Joint)	GWR/L&SWR	1962	
Chard Junction	L&SWR	1966	
Chard Town	L&SWR	1917	
Charfield	MR	1965	
Charlesfield Halt	LNER	1961	
Charlestown	Elgin Railway	1863	
Charlestown	NBR	1926	
Charlton (Northumberland)	NBR	1862	
Charlton Halt (Bristol)	GWR	1915	
Charlton Halt (Oxfordshire)	LNWR	1926	
Charlton Kings	GWR	1962	
Charlton Mackrell	GWR	1962	
Charlton Marshall Halt	S&D Joint	1956	
Charlton Road (Shepton Mallet)	S&D Joint	1966	
Chartley	GNR	1939	
Charwelton	GCR	1963	
Chatburn (1st)	L&YR	1876	
Chatburn (2nd)	L&YR	1962	
Chatham Central	South Eastern Railway (UK)	1911	
Chatteris	GNR/GER Joint Railway	1967	
Chatterley	North Staffordshire Railway	1948	
Chaul End	Great Northern Railway	1920	
Cheadle (Cheshire)	L&NWR	1917	
Cheadle (Staffordshire)	North Staffordshire Railway	1963	
Cheadle Heath	Midland Railway	1967	
Cheadle North	Cheshire Lines Committee	1964	
Checker House	GCR	1931	
Cheddar	GWR	1963	
Cheddleton	North Staffordshire Railway	1965	
Chedworth Halt	M&SWJR	1961	
Chee Dale Halt	British Rail	1987	
Chelfham	Lynton & Barnstaple Railway	1935	
Chell Halt	North Staffordshire Railway	1923	
Chellaston and Swarkestone	Midland Railway	1930	
Chelsea and Fulham	West London Extension Joint Railway	1940	
Cheltenham High Street	Midland Railway	1910	
Cheltenham High Street Halt	GWR	1917	
Cheltenham Leckhampton	Great Western Railway	1962	
Cheltenham Racecourse	Great Western Railway	1976	reopened 2003
Cheltenham Spa Malvern Road	GWR	1966	
Cheltenham Spa St. James	GWR	1966	
Chepstow East	South Wales Railway	1852	
Chequerbent (1831)	Bolton and Leigh Railway	1885	
Chequerbent (1885)	L&NWR	1952	
Cheriton Halt	SE&CR	1947	
Cherry Burton	NER	1959	
Cherryhinton	Eastern Counties Railway	1854	
Cherry Tree Lane (Doncaster)	South Yorkshire Railway	1852	
Chester Golf Club Halt	Great Central Railway	1923	
Chester Junction Golf Club Platform	Great Central Railway	1895	
Chester Liverpool Road	GCR	1951	
Chester Northgate	Cheshire Lines Committee	1969	
Chesterfield Central	GCR	1963	
Chesterfield Market Place	Lancashire, Derbyshire and East Coast Railway	1951	
Chesterfield Road	Ashover Light Railway	1936	
Chesterton	Eastern Counties Railway	1850	
Chesterton Lane Halt	British Railways	1964	
Chettisham	GER	1960	
Chevening Halt	SECR	1961	
Chevington	NER	1958	
Chew Moor	L&YR	1852	
Chichester (West Sussex Railway)	West Sussex Railway	1935	
Chickenley Heath	GNR	1909	
Chilcompton	S&D	1966	
Childwall	Cheshire Lines Committee	1931	
Chilsworthy	Plymouth, Devonport and South Western Junction Railway	1966	
Chiltern Green	Midland Railway	1952	
Chilton Siding	Cleobury Mortimer and Ditton Priors Light Railway	1917	
Chilvers Coton	L&NWR	1965	
Chinnor	GWR	1957	
Chipping Campden	GWR	1966	
Chipping Norton (1st)	GWR	1887	
Chipping Norton (2nd)	GWR	1962	
Chipping Sodbury	GWR	1961	
Chirk	Glyn Valley Tramway	1933	
Chirnside	NBR	1951	
Chiseldon	M&SWJR	1961	
Chiseldon Camp Halt	GWR	1961	
Chislet Colliery Halt	SE&CR	1971	
Chittening Platform	GWR	1964	
Chollerton	NBR	1956	
Choppington	NER	1950	
Chorley ROF Halt	LM&SR	1965	
Chorlton-cum-Hardy	Midland Railway	1967	
Christchurch-first station	Ringwood, Christchurch and Bournemouth Railway	1886	
Christian Malford Halt	GWR	1965	
Christon Bank	NER	1958	
Christow	GWR	1958	
Chryston	Monklands Railway	1851	
Chudleigh	GWR	1958	
Chudleigh Knighton Halt	GWR	1958	
Church Brampton	L&NWR	1931	
Church Manor Way Halt	SE&CR	1920	
Church Road (Birmingham)	Midland Railway	1925	
Church Road (Garston)	L&NWR	1939	
Church Road (Monmouthshire)	B&MJR	1957	
Church Siding	Wotton Tramway	1894	
Church Street (Rickmansworth)	L&NWR	1952	
Church Village Halt	Taff Vale Railway	1952	
Churchbury	GER	1919	reopened 1960
Churchdown	GWR/MR Joint Railway	1964	
Church's Hill Halt	BR	1964	
Churchtown	WLR	1964	
Churn Halt	GWR	1962	
Churston	GWR	1972	taken over by Paignton & Dartmouth Rly
Churwell	L&NWR	1940	
Chwilog	L&NWR	1964	

== Ci ==
Station (Town, unless in station name)	Rail company	Year closed	Notes
Cilfrew	Neath and Brecon Railway	1962	
Cilfynydd	TVR	1932	
Ciliau Aeron	GWR	1951	
Cinderford	Severn and Wye Railway	1958	
Cirencester Town	GWR	1964	
Cirencester Watermoor	M&SWJR	1961	
City Road	City and South London Railway	1922	

== Cl ==
Station (Town, unless in station name)	Rail company	Year closed	Notes
Clachnaharry	Highland Railway	1913	
Clackmannan and Kennet	NBR	1930	
Clackmannan Road	NBR	1921	
Clapham	LC&DR	1916	
Clapham Common	L&SWR	1863	
Clapton Road	Weston, Clevedon and Portishead Railway	1940	
Clare	GER	1967	
Clarence Dock	Liverpool Overhead Railway	1956	
Clarence Road (Cardiff)	Great Western Railway	1964	
Clarkston (Lanarks)	North British Railway	1956	reopened as Drumgelloch in 2011
Clatford	L&SWR	1964	
Claughton	NWR	1853	
Claxby and Usselby	GCR	1960	
Clay Cross	MR	1967	
Clay Cross and Egstow	ALR	1936	
Clay Lane	ALR	1936	
Claydon (Buckinghamshire)	L&NWR	1968	
Claydon (Suffolk)	GER	1963	
Claypole	GNR	1957	
Clayton	GNR	1955	
Clayton Bridge	L&YR	1968	
Clayton West	L&YR	1983	
Clearbrook Halt	GWR	1962	
Cleator Moor	Whitehaven, Cleator and Egremont Junction Railway	1866	
Cleator Moor East	Whitehaven, Cleator and Egremont Junction Railway	1931	
Cleator Moor West	Cleator and Workington Junction Railway	1931	
Cleckheaton Central	L&YR	1965	
Cleckheaton Spen	L&NWR	1953	
Cledford Bridge Halt	L&NWR	1942	
Cleeve	MR	1950	
Clegg Street (Oldham)	Oldham, Ashton and Guide Bridge Junction Railway	1959	
Cleghorn	Caledonian	1965	
Cleland (Old)	Caledonian	1930	
Clenchwarton	M&GNJR	1959	
Cleobury Mortimer	GWR	1962	
Cleobury Town	CM&DPLR	1938	
Clevedon	Weston, Clevedon and Portishead Railway	1940	
Clevedon	GWR	1966	
Clevedon All Saints	Weston, Clevedon and Portishead Railway	1940	
Clevedon East	Weston, Clevedon and Portishead Railway	1940	
Cleveland Bridge	G&I	1961	
Cleveland Port	Middlesbrough and Redcar Railway	1885	
Cliburn	NER	1956	
Cliddesden	L&SWR	1932	
Cliff Common	Derwent Valley Light Railway	1926	
Cliff Common	NER	1954	
Cliffe	SER	1961	
Cliffe Park	North Staffordshire Railway	1960	
Cliffe Vale	North Staffordshire Railway	1865	
Clifford	Golden Valley Railway	1941	
Clifton and Lowther	LNWR	1938	
Clifton Bridge	GWR	1964	
Clifton (Mayfield)	North Staffordshire Railway	1954	
Clifton Mill	L&NWR	1953	
Clifton Moor	NER	1962	
Clifton Road (Brighouse)	L&YR	1931	
Clifton-on-Trent	LD&ECR	1955	
Clipston and Oxendon	L&NWR	1960	
Clitheroe	L&YR	1962	reopened 1994
Clock Face	LNWR	1951	
Clocksbriggs	Caledonian Railway	1955	
Closeburn	GSWR	1961	
Clough Fold	L&YR	1966	
Cloughton	NER	1965	
Clovenfords	North British Railway	1962	
Clowne and Barlborough	Midland Railway	1954	
Clowne South	LD&ECR	1939	
Cloy Halt	GWR	1962	
Clubmoor	Cheshire Lines Committee	1960	
Clunes	Highland Railway	1960	
Clutton	GWR	1959	
Clydach	L&NWR	1958	
Clydach Court Halt	Taff Vale Railway	1952	
Clydach-on-Tawe	MR	1950	
Clydebank East	NBR	1959	
Clydebank Riverside	Caledonian	1964	
Clyne Halt	GWR	1964	
Clyst St Mary and Digby Halt	L&SWR	1948	

== Co ==
Station (Town, unless in station name)	Rail company	Year closed	Notes
Coalbrookdale	GWR	1962	
Coalburn	Caledonian Railway	1965	
Coaley Junction	MR	1965	
Coalpit Heath	GWR	1961	
Coalport East	L&NWR	1952	
Coalport	Great Western Railway	1963	
Coalville East	L&NWR	1931	
Coalville Town	MR	1964	
Coanwood	NER	1976	
Coatbridge Central	North British Railway	1951	
Cobbinshaw (1st)	Caledonian Railway	1875	
Cobbinshaw (2nd)	Caledonian Railway	1966	
Coborn Road	GER	1946	
Cobridge	North Staffordshire Railway	1964	
Cockburnspath	North British Railway	1951	
Cocker Bar	L&YR	1859	
Cockerham Cross Halt	Knott End Railway	1930	
Cockermouth (C&W)	Cockermouth & Workington Railway	1865	
Cockermouth (CK&PR)	Cockermouth, Keswick and Penrith Railway	1966	
Cockett	GWR	1964	
Cockfield (Suffolk)	GER	1961	
Cockfield Fell (Co. Durham)	NER	1958	
Cocking	LB&SCR	1935	
Codford	GWR	1955	
Codnor Park and Ironville	MR	1967	
Codnor Park and Selston later Jacksdale	GNR	1964	
Coed Ely	GWR	1958	
Coed Poeth	Great Western Railway	1931	
Coed Talon	Wrexham and Minera Joint Railway	1950	
Coedpenmaen	Taff Vale Railway	1915	
Cofton	Birmingham and Gloucester Railway	1843	
Cogie Hill Halt	Knott End Railway	1930	
Colbren Junction	Neath and Brecon Railway	1962	
Cold Meece	LMSR	1959	
Cold Norton	GER	1939	
Coldham	GER	1966	
Coldharbour Halt	GWR	1963	
Coldstream	NER	1964	
Cole	Somerset and Dorset Joint Railway	1966	
Cole Green	GNR	1951	
Coleburn	Great North of Scotland Railway	1871	possibly in private use until 1930s
Coleford (S&WR.)	Severn and Wye Railway	1929	
Coleford (GWR)	GWR	1917	
Colehouse Lane	Weston, Clevedon and Portishead Railway	1940	
Coleshill	Midland Railway	1968	reopened 2007
Colfin	Portpatrick and Wigtownshire Joint Railway	1950	
Colinton	Caledonian Railway	1943	
College (Glasgow)	Glasgow and Coatbridge Railway	1886	
Collessie	North British Railway	1955	
Colliery Road	Campbeltown and Machrihanish Railway	1927	
Collingbourne	Midland and South Western Junction Railway	1961	
Collingbourne Kingston Halt	Great Western Railway	1961	
Collingham Bridge	NER	1964	
Collins Green	Liverpool & Manchester Railway	1951	
Colliston	Caledonian Railway	1955	
Colnbrook	GWR	1965	
Colnbrook Estate Halt	British Railways	1965	
Coltfield Platform	Highland Railway	1931	
Coltishall	East Norfolk Railway	1952	
Colwich	LNWR	1958	
Colyford	L&SWR	1966	
Colyton	L&SWR	1966	
Colzium	Kilsyth and Bonnybridge Railway	1917	
Combe Hay Halt	GWR	1925	
Comberow	West Somerset Mineral Railway	1898	
Combpyne	L&SWR	1965	
Commercial Dock	SER	1867	
Commercial Street Platform	Taff Vale Railway	1912	
Commins Coch Halt	GWR	1965	
Commondyke	G&SWR	1950	
Commonhead	North British Railway	1930	
Compton	GWR	1962	
Compton Halt	GWR	1932	
Comrie	Caledonian Railway	1964	
Conder Green	LNWR	1930	
Condover Halt	GWR	1958	
Congleton Upper Junction	North Staffordshire Railway	1864	
Congresbury	GWR	1963	
Coningsby	GNR	1970	
Conishead Priory	Furness Railway	1916	
Coniston	Furness Railway	1958	
Connah's Quay	LNWR	1966	
Connaught Road	Eastern Counties and Thames Junction Railway	1940	
Conon	Highland Railway	1960	reopened 2013
Consall	North Staffordshire Railway	1965	reopened 1998
Consett	North Eastern Railway	1955	
Constable Burton	North Eastern Railway	1954	
Conway Marsh / Conway Morfa	LNWR	1927	
Conwil	GWR	1965	
Coole Pilate Halt	Great Western Railway	1963	
Coombe Road	Woodside and South Croydon Railway	1983	
Coombes Holloway Halt	Halesowen Railway	1927	
Cooper Bridge	L&YR	1950	
Copgrove	NER	1950	
Copley	L&YR	1931	
Copmanthorpe	York and North Midland Railway	1959	
Coppenhall	Grand Junction Railway	1840	
Copper Pit Platform	GWR	1956	
Copperas Hill	Cleator and Workington Junction Railway	1921	
Copperhouse Halt (Hayle)	West Cornwall Railway	1852	
Copperhouse Halt	GWR	1908	
Coppull (1st)	LNWR	1895	
Coppull (2nd)	LNWR	1969	
Corby	MR	1967	reopened 2009
Corby Glen	GNR	1959	
Corfe Castle	L&SWR	1972	reopened 1995
Corfe Mullen Halt	Somerset and Dorset Joint Railway	1956	
Corkerhill	G&SWR	1983	reopened 1990
Cornborough	Bideford, Westward Ho! and Appledore Railway	1917	
Cornbrook	Manchester, South Junction and Altrincham Railway	1865	
Cornhill	GNSR	1968	
Cornholme	L&YR	1938	
Cornwood	GWR	1959	
Corporation Bridge (Grimsby)	G&I/GCR	1961	
Corpusty & Saxthorpe	M&GNJR	1959	
Corringham	Corringham Light Railway	1952	
Corris	Corris Railway	1931	
Corsham	GWR	1965	
Corstorphine	NBR	1968	
Corton (Suffolk)	Norfolk and Suffolk Joint Railway	1970	
Corwen	GWR	1964	
Corwen East	Llangollen Railway	2018	
Coryates Halt	GWR	1952	
Coryton (Devon)	GWR	1962	
Coryton (Essex)	Corringham Light Railway	1952	
Cossington	S&DJR	1952	
Cossington Gate	MR	1873	
Cotehill	MR	1952	
Cotham	GNR	1939	
Cotherstone	NER	1964	
Cottam	GCR	1959	
Cottingwith	Derwent Valley Light Railway	1926	
Coughton	MR	1952	
Coulsdon North	LB&SCR	1983	
Coulter	Caledonian Railway	1950	
Cound Halt	GWR	1963	
Coundon	NER	1939	
Coundon Road (originally "Counden Road")	L&NWR	1965	
Counter Drain	M&GNJR	1959	
Countess Park	NBR	1861	
Countesthorpe	MR	1962	
County School (Norfolk)	GER	1964	
Coupar Angus	Scottish Midland Junction Railway/CR	1967	
Court House (Barnsley)	MR	1960	
Court Sart	Rhondda and Swansea Bay Railway	1935	
Cove Bay	CR	1956	
Cove Halt	GWR	1963	
Cowbit	GNR/GER Joint Railway	1961	
Cowbridge (Glamorgan) (1st)	TVR	1892	
Cowbridge (Glamorgan) (2nd)	TVR	1951	
Cowdenbeath Old	NBR	1919	
Cowes (Isle of Wight)	Isle of Wight Central Railway	1966	
Cowlairs	NBR	1964	
Cowley	GWR	1962	
Cowton	NER	1958	
Coxbank Halt	GWR	1963	
Coxbench	MR	1930	
Cox Green	NER	1964	
Coxhoe	Clarence Railway/NER	1902	
Coxhoe Bridge	NER	1952	
Coxlodge	NER	1929	
Coxwold	NER	1953	

== Cr ==
Station (Town, unless in station name)	Rail company	Year closed	Notes
Cradoc	Neath and Brecon Railway	1962	
Crag Mill	NER	1877	
Craigellachie	GNSR	1968	
Craigie	Dundee and Arbroath Railway	1839	
Craigleith	Caledonian Railway	1962	
Craiglockhart	NBR	1962	
Craiglon Bridge Halt	GWR	1953	
Craigo	Caledonian Railway	1956	
Craig-y-nos (Penwyllt)	Neath and Brecon Railway	1962	
Crail	NBR	1965	
Crakehall	NER	1954	
Cranbrook (Kent)	SER	1961	
Crane Street, Pontypool	GWR	1962	
Cranford	MR	1956	
Crank Halt	L&NWR	1951	
Cranleigh	LB&SCR	1965	
Cranley Gardens	GNR	1954	
Cranmore	GWR	1963	
Crathes	Great North of Scotland Railway	1966	
Crawford	Caledonian Railway	1965	
Crawley (Durham)	Stockton and Darlington Railway	1846	
Cray	Neath and Brecon Railway	1962	
Creagan	Caledonian	1966	
Credenhill	MR	1962	
Creech St Michael Halt	GWR	1964	
Creekmoor Halt	SR	1966	
Creetown	Portpatrick and Wigtownshire Joint Railway	1965	
Creigiau	Barry Railway	1962	
Crescent (Peterborough)	MR	1866	
Cressage	GWR	1963	
Cresswell	North Staffordshire Railway	1966	
Creswell and Welbeck	LD&ECR	1939	
Crew Green	Potteries, Shrewsbury and North Wales Railway/Shropshire and Montgomeryshire Railway	1932	
Crianlarich Lower	Caledonian	1965	
Cricklade	M&SWJR	1961	
Crieff	Caledonian Railway	1964	
Criggion	Potteries, Shrewsbury and North Wales Railway/Shropshire and Montgomeryshire Railway	1932	
Crigglestone West	L&YR	1965	
Crimple	NER	1869	
Croesor Junction	Welsh Highland Railway	1936	
Croft (Leicester)	L&NWR	1968	
Croft (North Yorkshire)	Stockton and Darlington	1833	
Croft Spa	NER	1969	
Crofthead	Wilsontown, Morningside and Coltness Railway	1930	
Crofton (L&Y)	L&YR	1931	
Cromdale	GNSR	1965	
Cromer High	GER	1954	
Cromer Links Halt	Norfolk and Suffolk Joint Railway	1953	
Cronberry	G&SWR	1951	
Crook	NER	1965	
Crook of Devon	NBR	1964	
Crookston	G&SWR	1983	reopened 1990
Cropredy	GWR	1956	
Crosby Garrett	MR	1952	
Cross Hands Halt	GWR	1964	
Cross Inn	Taff Vale Railway	1952	
Crosskeys	GWR	1962	
Cross Lane	LNWR	1959	
Cross Slack	Preston and Wyre Joint Railway	1873	
Crossens	WLR	1964	
Crossford	G&SWR	1943	
Crossgatehall Halt	NBR	1930	
Crossgates (Fife)	NBR	1949	
Crosshill (Ayr)	G&SWR	1862	
Crosshill and Codnor	MR	1926	
Crosshouse	Glasgow, Paisley, Kilmarnock and Ayr Railway	1966	
Crossmichael	Portpatrick and Wigtownshire Joint Railway	1965	
Crossways Halt	GWR	1951	
Crouch End (London)	GNR	1954	
Crow Park	GNR	1958	
Crow Road (Glasgow)	Caledonian Railway	1960	
Crowden	GCR	1957	
Crowle North	Axholme Joint Railway	1933	
Crown Street (Carlisle)	Maryport and Carlisle Railway	1849	
Crown Street (Liverpool)	Liverpool and Manchester Railway	1836	
Crown Street Halt (Silverdale)	LM&SR	1949	
Croxall	MR	1928	
Croxdale	NER	1938	
Croxley Green	LNWR	1996	
Cruckton	Shropshire and Montgomeryshire Railway	1933	
Cruden Bay	GNSR	1932	
Crudgington	GWR	1963	
Crumlin	Newport, Abergavenny and Hereford Railway	1857	
Crumlin High Level	GWR	1964	
Crumlin Low Level	GWR	1962	
Crumstane	North British Railway	1852	
Crymmych Arms	GWR	1962	
Crynant	Neath and Brecon Railway	1962	
Crynant New Colliery Halt	Great Western Railway	1954	
Crystal Palace (High Level)	London, Chatham and Dover Railway	1954	

== Cu ==
Station (Town, unless in station name)	Rail company	Year closed	Notes
Cudworth	MR	1968	
Cuerdley	St Helens Canal and Railway	1858	
Culcheth	GCR	1964	
Culgaith	MR	1970	
Culkerton Halt	GWR	1964	
Cullen	GNSR	1968	
Cullingworth	GNR	1955	
Culloden Moor	Highland Railway	1965	
Cullompton	Bristol and Exeter Railway	1964	
Culmstock Halt	GWR (Culm Valley Light Railway)	1963	
Culross	North British Railway	1930	
Culter	GNSR	1966	
Cults (1st)	GNSR	1885	
Cults (2nd)	GNSR	1966	
Culworth	GCR	1958	
Cumberland Street (Glasgow)	G&SWR	1966	
Cummersdale	Maryport and Carlisle Railway	1951	
Cummertrees	G&SWR	1955	
Cummingston	Highland Railway	1904	
Cumnock	G&SWR	1951	
Cumnock Old	Glasgow, Paisley, Kilmarnock and Ayr Railway	1965	
Cumwhinton	MR	1956	
Cunninghamhead	G&SWR	1951	
Currie	Caledonian Railway	1943	
Currie Hill	Caledonian Railway	1951	
Curthwaite	Maryport and Carlisle Railway	1959	
Curzon Street (Birmingham)	LNWR	1854	
Cuthlie	Dundee and Arbroath Railway	1929	
Cutlers Green Halt	GER	1952	
Cutnall Green Halt	GWR	1965	

== Cw ==
Station (Town, unless in station name)	Rail company	Year closed	Notes
Cwm	GWR	1962	
Cwm Bargoed	Taff Bargoed Railway	1964	
Cwm Prysor Halt	GWR	1960	
Cwmaman Colliery Halt	GWR	1924	
Cwmaman Crossing Halt	GWR	1924	
Cwmavon (Glamorgan)	Rhondda and Swansea Bay Railway	1962	
Cwmavon (Mon.)	GWR	1962	
Cwmbach Halt	GWR	1964	reopened 1988
Cwmbran (GWR)	GWR	1962	A new Cwmbran railway station was opened at a different location in 1986
Cwmbran (MR&C)	Monmouthshire Railway and Canal Company	1880	
Cwmcarn	GWR	1962	
Cwmdu	Port Talbot Railway and Docks	1932	
Cwmffrwd Halt	GWR	1962	
Cwmffrwdoer Halt	GWR	1941	
Cwmllynfell	MR	1950	
Cwmmawr	Burry Port and Gwendraeth Valley Railway	1953	
Cwmneol Halt	GWR	1924	
Cwmsyfiog	Brecon and Merthyr Railway	1937	
Cwmsyfiog Halt (1st)	GWR	1937	
Cwmsyfiog Halt (2nd)	GWR	1962	
Cwmtwrch Well Halt	LMS	1950	
Cwm-y-Glo	L&NWR	1930	

== Cy ==
Station (Town, unless in station name)	Rail company	Year closed	Notes
Cymmer Afan	Rhondda and Swansea Bay Railway	1970	
Cymmer Corrwg	South Wales Mineral Railway	1930	
Cynonville Halt	Rhondda and Swansea Bay Railway	1956	
Cynwyd	GWR	1964	
