= Carterhatch =

Carterhatch may refer to:

- Carterhatch (ward)
- Carterhatch Lane railway station

== See also ==
- Carterhaugh
