= Birstall railway station =

Birstall railway station may refer to:

- Birstall Town railway station (1900-1953), earlier known as Upper Birstall, in Birstall, West Yorkshire
- Birstall railway station (West Yorkshire) (1852-1862), later known as Birstall Lower, in Birstall, West Yorkshire

== See also ==
- Belgrave and Birstall railway station, Leicestershire
