= Caerau =

Caerau may refer to:

- Caerau, Anglesey, a hamlet on Anglesey, north Wales
- Caerau, Bridgend, a village near Maesteg, south Wales
  - Caerau F.C., Maesteg
  - Caerau railway station
- Caerau (Bridgend electoral ward), an electoral ward in Maesteg, Wales
- Caerau, Cardiff, a district (and electoral ward) of the city of Cardiff, Wales
