= Berw =

Berw may refer to:

- Berwickshire, a county in Scotland
- Berw Fault, a geological fault in Wales
- Berw Road Halt railway station, Trallwn, Wales
- Pentre Berw, a village on Anglesey, Wales
