= Coryton station =

Coryton station may refer to:

- Coryton railway station, a current station in Wales
- Coryton railway station (Devon), open from 1865 to 1962 on the South Devon and Tavistock_Railway in Coryton, Devon
- Coryton railway station (Essex), open from 1901 to 1952 on the Corringham Light Railway and serving the Coryton Refinery
- Coryton Power Station, in Essex, England
