= Yaxley and Farcet railway station =

Former railway station in Cambridgeshire, England

Coordinates: 52.5217°N 0.2416°W

Yaxley and Farcet
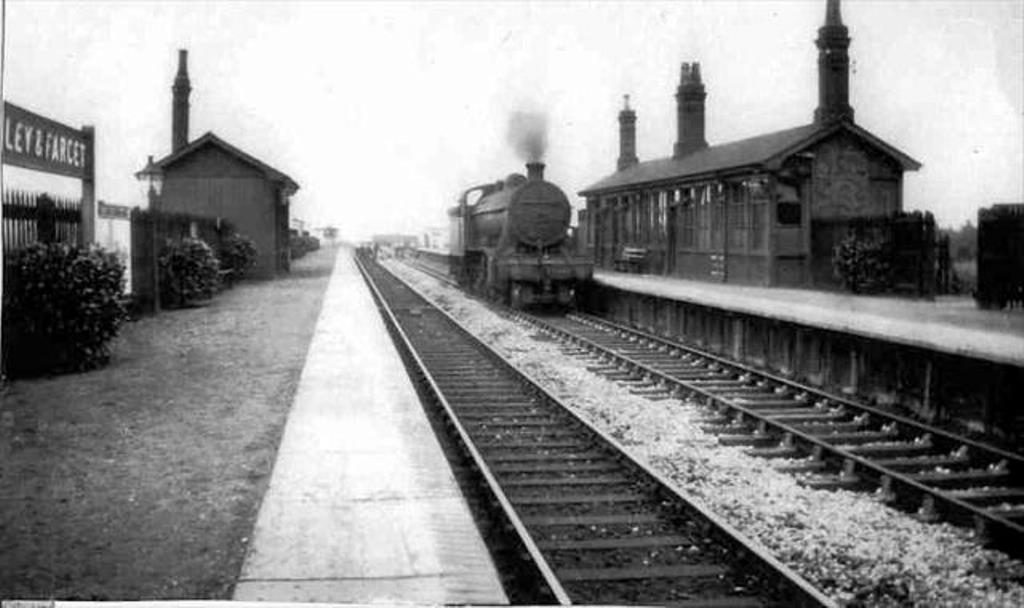
- A photograph of the station (c. 1920s)

General information
- Location: Huntingdonshire; England
- Grid reference: TL194930
- Platforms: 2

Other information
- Status: Disused

History
- Original company: Great Northern Railway
- Pre-grouping: Great Northern Railway
- Post-grouping: London and North Eastern Railway

Key dates
- 19 May 1890: Opened as Yaxley
- July 1895: Renamed Yaxley and Farcet
- 6 April 1959: Closed for passengers
- after 1964: closed for freight
Location

Yaxley and Farcet railway station is a former station in Yaxley, Cambridgeshire, just south of Peterborough.

== History ==
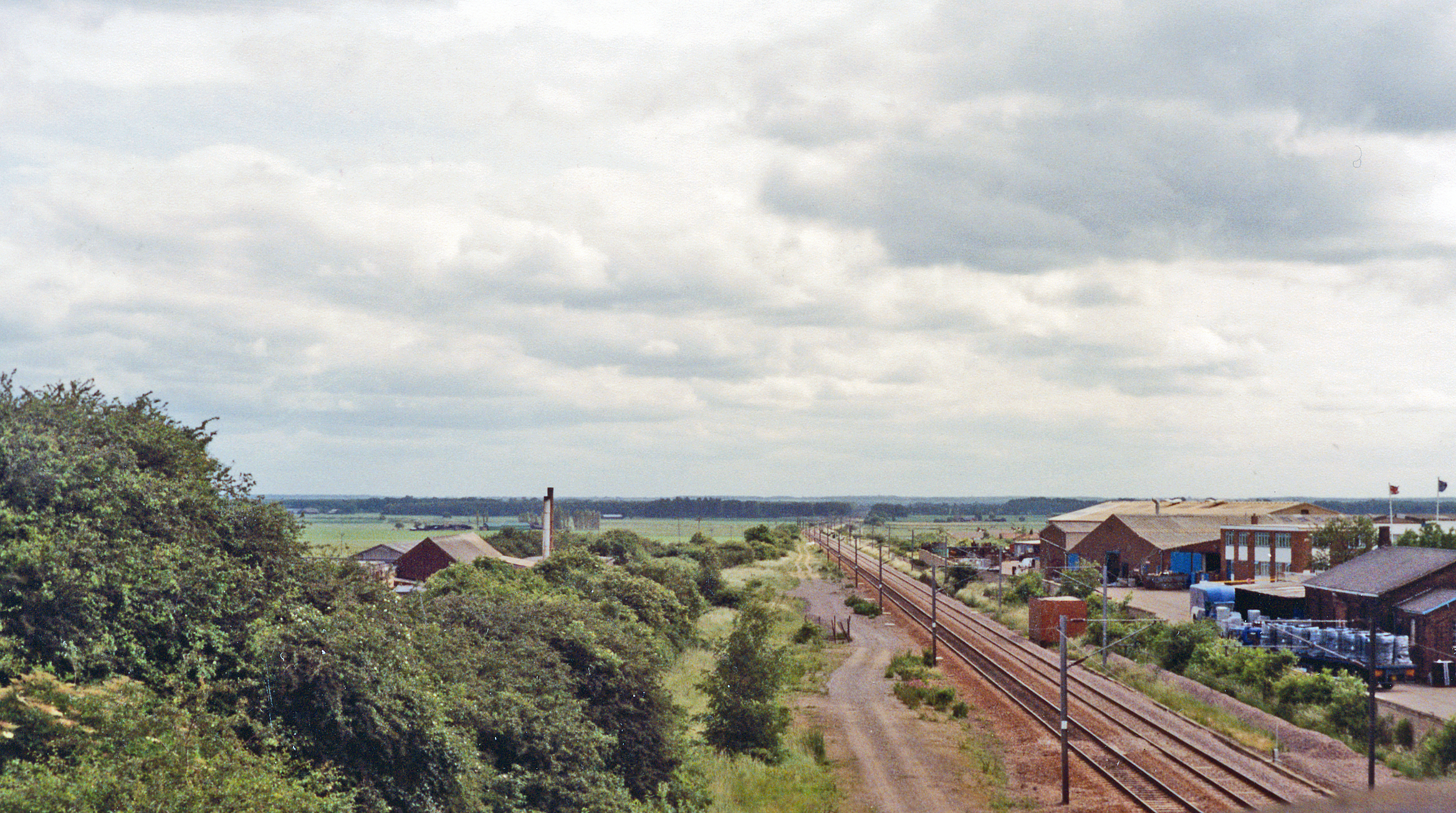
The station site in 1992

The station was opened by the Great Northern Railway on 19 May 1890, originally being named Yaxley; just over five years later, in July 1895, it was renamed Yaxley and Farcet.

The station was closed for passengers on 6 April 1959.

== Route ==
Preceding station	Historical railways	Following station
Holme; Line open, station closed	Great Northern Railway; East Coast Main Line	Peterborough North; Line and station open
