= Ton Llwyd Halt railway station =

Disused railway station in Aberaman, Rhondda Cynon Taf

Ton Llwyd Halt

General information
- Location: Aberaman, Glamorganshire; Wales
- Coordinates: 51.697°N 3.4305°W
- Grid reference: SO012007

Other information
- Status: Disused

History
- Original company: Great Western Railway
- Pre-grouping: Great Western Railway

Key dates
- 1903: Opened to miners
- 1 January 1906: Opened to public
- 2 January 1922: Closed to passengers
- 1932: Closed to miners
Location

Ton Llwyd Halt railway station served the village of Aberaman, in the historical county of Glamorganshire, Wales, from 1906 to 1932 on the Vale of Neath Railway.

== History ==
The station was opened to the public on 1 January 1906, although it opened to miners in 1903. It closed to passengers on 2 January 1922 but remained open for miners until 1932.

Preceding station	Disused railways	Following station
Godreaman Halt; Line and station closed	Great Western Railway; Vale of Neath Railway	Black Lion Crossing Halt; Line and station closed
