= Black Lion Crossing Halt railway station =

Short-lived railway station in Aberdare, Rhondda Cynon Taf

Coordinates: 51.7093°N 3.4494°W

Black Lion Crossing Halt

General information
- Location: Aberdare, Glamorganshire; Wales
- Platforms: 1

Other information
- Status: Disused

History
- Original company: Great Western Railway
- Post-grouping: Great Western Railway

Key dates
- 1 January 1906: Opened
- 22 September 1924: Closed
Location

Black Lion Crossing Halt railway station served the town of Aberdare, in the historical county of Glamorganshire, Wales, from 1906 to 1924 on the Vale of Neath Railway.

== History ==
The station was opened on 1 January 1906 by the Great Western Railway. It closed on 22 September 1924.

Preceding station	Disused railways	Following station
Ton Llwyd Halt; Line and station closed	Great Western Railway; Vale of Neath Railway	Merthyr Road; Line open, station closed
