= Carlisle Canal railway station =

Disused railway station in Cumbria, England

Carlisle Canal

General information
- Location: Western Carlisle, Cumberland; England
- Coordinates: 54.8949°N 2.9519°W
- Grid reference: NY390559
- Platforms: 2 (probable)

Other information
- Status: Disused

History
- Original company: Port Carlisle Railway Company
- Pre-grouping: North British Railway
- Post-grouping: London and North Eastern Railway

Key dates
- 22 June 1854: Opened to trains from Port Carlisle
- 4 September 1856: Trains started running from Silloth
- 1 July 1864: Station closed to passengers when trains were diverted to Carlisle Citadel
Location

Carlisle Canal railway station was opened in 1854 as the Carlisle terminus of the Port Carlisle Railway Company's line from Port Carlisle in Cumbria, England. That line was largely laid along the course of the Carlisle Canal, hence the station's name.

== History ==
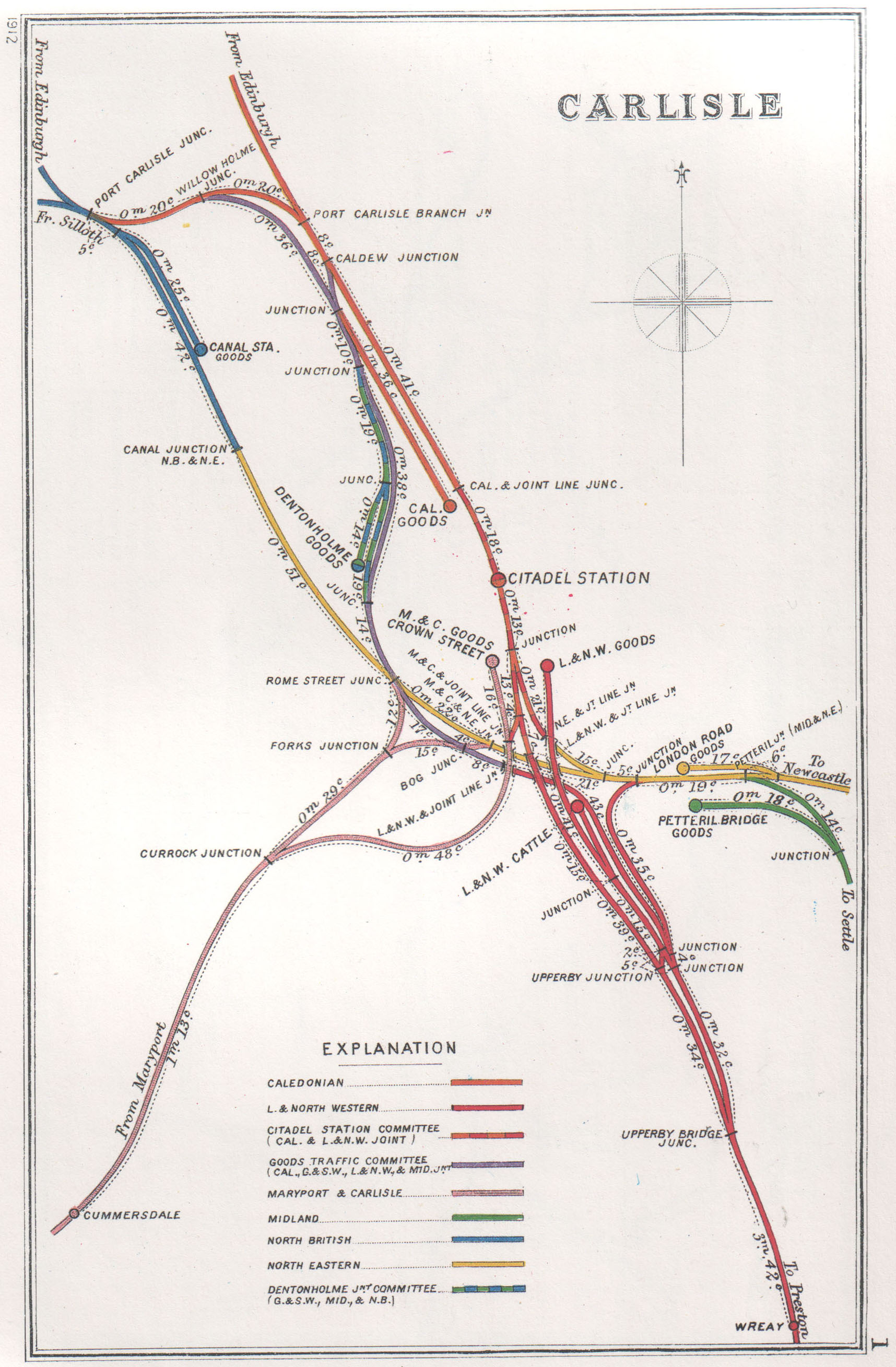
A 1912 Railway Clearing House Junction Diagram showing railways in the vicinity of Carlisle Canal (upper left)

Services were increased in 1856 when the Carlisle and Silloth Bay Railway opened its line to Silloth, also using Carlisle Canal station as its Carlisle terminus.

The station served as a terminus for passenger services, but tracks made an end-on junction ("Canal Junction") with the North Eastern Railway a short distance south of the station. Passenger services could have continued through to points east of Carlisle, but this never occurred in the station's lifetime.

Sources differ on what services used the station in the early 1860s. An authority states that NBR trains used Carlisle Citadel from Scotch Dyke from opening on 29 October 1861, implying that subsequent NBR services never used the station at Carlisle Canal.

The NBR leased the Carlisle and Silloth Bay Railway in 1862 and pursued a lavish, arguably profligate, campaign of investment and overprovision on that line in its battle with the Caledonian to gain access to England, including building a port and, effectively, the railway town of Silloth in the scarcely populated northwest corner of the country. The company held a poor hand. It had incurred heavy expenditure on building the Waverley Route but had its endeavours obstructed over access to what is now the West Coast Main Line (WCML) in Carlisle. The company had physical access to the WCML via Port Carlisle Junction and Port Carlisle Branch Junction and legal access via running rights, but the Caledonian and LNWR conspired to make life difficult, by, for example, refusing through bookings for passengers from the NBR.

Indirect evidence that the NBR never used Canal station is given by the short-lived station at Port Carlisle Junction. To get to Carlisle Canal station trains from Silloth, Port Carlisle and the Waverley Route had to swing south east at Port Carlisle Junction; to get to Carlisle Citadel they had to swing north east at the junction then join what is now the West Coast Main Line at Port Carlisle Branch Junction. The Caledonian Railway (Caledonian) then charged monies for (and created obstructions against) using the last nine tenths of a mile to Citadel. The physical Port Carlisle junction came into use on 29 October 1861 and would have allowed Silloth and Port Carlisle trains to divert to Citadel there and then. Instead, among all the jostling between the big Scottish rivals, the NBR built a station at Port Carlisle Junction, which first appeared in Bradshaw in July 1863. Research is needed on which of Silloth, Port Carlisle and Waverley Route trains called at the new station and whether they terminated or continued to Canal or Citadel, but the station's only vaguely practical purpose appears to be for passengers and parcels from the Silloth and Port Carlisle lines wishing to travel to Citadel and beyond to change to NBR services for the last lap, thereby avoiding hassle and fees, and the reverse in the opposite direction. This, however, is cast into doubt by the location of at least one platform which survived long after closure and may have survived at least until 2011. This suggests that, in contrast to Quick's map 20 the station was north of the junction on purely Waverley Route metals, not being available to Silloth line customers at all. From the Disused Stations article it appears that the confusion over the junction's name has spread far into the future.

For whatever reason this manifestly unsatisfactory state of affairs was resolved from 1 July 1864 when the NBR and the Caledonian had buried enough hatchets to run Silloth and Port Carlisle trains to and from Citadel, allowing both Carlisle Canal and Port Carlisle Junction stations to close to passengers. Canal station became a goods station and remained so for years. It appears in Engineers' Line Reference data as "Canal goods depot".

The water is muddied by errors and omissions in otherwise authoritative maps. The Edwardian OS map linked to this article incorrectly labels Port Carlisle Junction as "Canal Junction" and Port Carlisle Branch Junction as "Port Carlisle Junction". A possible cause of the first error could be the signalbox at Port Carlisle Junction which was prominently labelled "Canal Junction". Jowett correctly labels all three junctions, with Canal Junction being an end-on junction between the NBR and NER. Quite correctly Jowett does not show Canal station as his map is a snapshot taken years after it closed to passengers, but had the station survived until then it would be approximately next to the "D" in "Dalston Rd Sidings P5". The 1867 OS map linked to this article shows Canal station but omits most junction names.

== See also ==
- List of closed railway stations in Britain

Preceding station	Disused railways	Following station
Terminus	North British Railway; Carlisle and Silloth Bay Railway	Port Carlisle Junction; Line and station closed
