= Minshull Vernon railway station =

Former railway station in England

Minshull Vernon

General information
- Location: Cheshire East; England
- Coordinates: 53.15575°N 2.47103°W
- Grid reference: SJ 686 622
- Platforms: 2

Other information
- Status: Disused

History
- Opened: 4 July 1837
- Closed: 2 March 1942
- Original company: Grand Junction Railway
- Pre-grouping: London and North Western Railway
- Post-grouping: London, Midland and Scottish Railway
Location

Minshull Vernon railway station was a station on the Grand Junction Railway serving the villages of Warmington and Minshull Vernon. It opened on 4 July 1837 when the line opened.

Wishaw (1842) describes the intermediate stations on the line, such as this one, as "built in the cottage style, and without any pretensions to studied design".

The station is located on the south side of Nantwich Road (Middlewich Road a little to the south) which is now the A530. The road crossed the railway on an over-bridge, with steps down to each platform. The main station building appears to be on the up platform, to the east of the lines.

In the early years the station had two mixed trains in each direction. Times changed from year to year. By 1850 an additional morning train to Liverpool had been added. (Note: Mixed trains at this time meant a mixture of first and second class carriages and the train probably stopped at every station. By contrast first class trains has only first class carriages and stopped at only first class stations)

The station was awarded a "Special Class" prize of £10 in the LMS station garden competition of 1925.

By 1939 the lines through the station had been quadrupled with the fast lines in the centre and the slow lines on the outside. Platforms were only provided on the outside of the slow lines.

The station closed in 1942.

The station buildings were demolished in the 1960s.

Preceding station	Historical railways	Following station
Coppenhall	London and North Western Railway; Grand Junction Railway	Winsford
