= Weston-on-Trent railway station =

Former railway station in Derbyshire, England

Weston on Trent
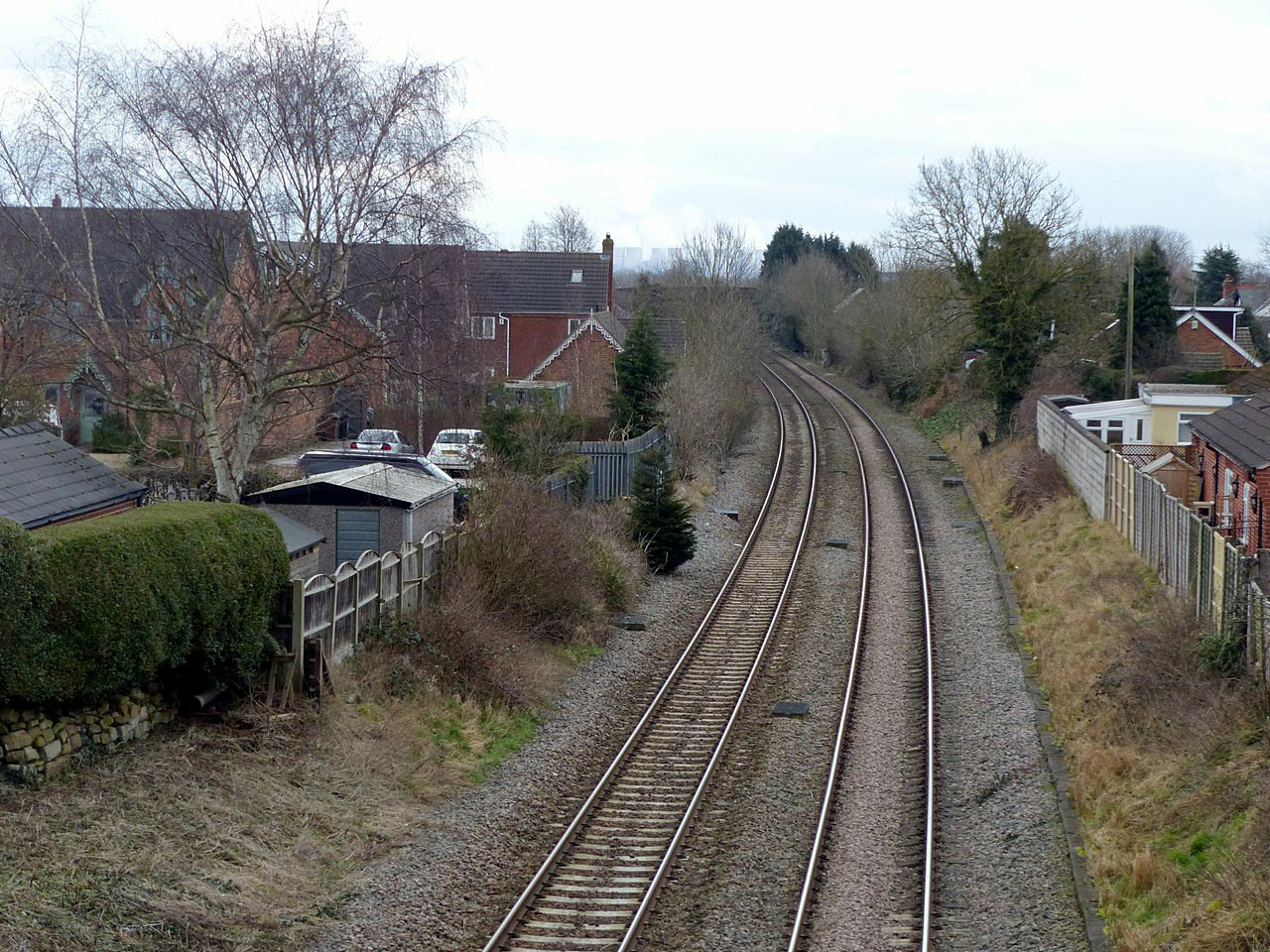
- The site of Weston on Trent station

General information
- Location: Weston-on-Trent, South Derbyshire; England
- Coordinates: 52.847174°N 1.4028361°W
- Platforms: 2

Other information
- Status: Disused

History
- Original company: Midland Railway
- Pre-grouping: Midland Railway
- Post-grouping: London, Midland and Scottish Railway

Key dates
- 6 December 1869: Opened
- 21 September 1930: Closed for passengers
- 1959: Closed for freight
Location

Weston on Trent railway station served the village of Weston-on-Trent, Derbyshire from 1869 to 1930.

== History ==
The station was opened on 6 December 1869, when the Midland Railway opened its Weston, Castle Donington and Trent branch.

It was closed to passengers on 21 September 1930 then closed to freight in 1959.

== Services ==
Preceding station	Disused railways	Following station
Chellaston and Swarkestone; Line open, station closed	Midland Railway; Castle Donington line	Castle Donington and Shardlow; Line closed, station closed
