= Carlinghow railway station =

Disused railway station in Carlinghow, West Yorkshire

Coordinates: 53.7210°N 1.6418°W

Carlinghow

General information
- Location: Carlinghow, West Riding of Yorkshire; England
- Platforms: 2

Other information
- Status: Disused

History
- Original company: London and North Western Railway
- Pre-grouping: London and North Western Railway

Key dates
- 1 April 1872: Opened
- 15 April 1917: Closed
Location

Carlinghow railway station served the district of Carlinghow, in the historic county of West Riding of Yorkshire, England, from 1872 to 1917 on the Birstall Branch line.

== History ==
The station was opened on 1 April 1872 by the London and North Western Railway. It closed as a wartime economy measure on 15 April 1917. Like Birstall, it erroneously showed as 'service suspended' in Bradshaw.

Preceding station	Disused railways	Following station
Birstall; Line and station closed	Birstall Branch lineLondon and North Western Railway	Batley
