= Godreaman Halt railway station =

Disused railway station in Godreaman, Rhondda Cynon Taf

Godreaman Halt

General information
- Location: Godreaman, Glamorganshire; Wales
- Coordinates: 51.695661°N 3.430895°W
- Platforms: 1

Other information
- Status: Disused

History
- Original company: Great Western Railway
- Pre-grouping: Great Western Railway
- Post-grouping: Great Western Railway

Key dates
- 1903: Opened to miners
- 1 January 1906: Opened to the public
- 2 January 1922: Resited
- 22 September 1924: Closed to passengers
- 1932: Closed to miners
Location

Godreaman Halt railway station served the suburb of Godreaman, in the historical county of Glamorganshire, Wales, from 1906 to 1932 on the Vale of Neath Railway.

== History ==
=== First site ===
Coordinates:
51.694°N 3.4324°W
The first site of the station opened to the public on 1 January 1906, although it opened to miners in 1903. It was resited on 2 January 1922.

=== Second site ===
Coordinates:
51.6962°N 3.4306°W
The second site of the station opened on 2 January 1922. It closed to the public on 22 September 1924and closed to miners in 1932.

Preceding station	Disused railways	Following station
Cwmneol Halt; Line and station closed	Great Western Railway; Vale of Neath Railway	Ton Llwyd Halt; Line and station closed
