= Clydach Court Halt railway station =

Disused railway station in Swansea, Wales

Clydach Court Halt

General information
- Location: Clydach, Glamorganshire; Wales
- Coordinates: 51.6228°N 3.3284°W
- Grid reference: ST081923

Other information
- Status: Disused

History
- Original company: Taff Vale Railway
- Pre-grouping: Taff Vale Railway
- Post-grouping: Great Western Railway

Key dates
- July 1917: Opened as Clydach Court Platform
- 2 October 1922: Name changed to Clydach Court Halt
- 28 July 1952: Closed
Location

Clydach Court Halt railway station served the village of Clydach, in the historical county of Glamorganshire, Wales, from 1917 to 1952 on the Ynysybwl branch line railway.

== History ==
The station was opened as Clydach Court Platform in July 1917 by the Taff Vale Railway, although an inspection was carried out on 16 October 1915 so it may have opened earlier. Its name was changed to Clydach Court Halt on 2 October 1922. It closed along with the line on 28 July 1952.

Preceding station	Disused railways	Following station
Ynysybwl New Road Platform; Line and station closed	Taff Vale Railway; Ynysybwl branch line railway	Terminus
