= Penscynor Halt railway station =

Disused railway station in Cilfrew, Neath Port Talbot

Penscynor Halt

General information
- Location: Cilfrew, Glamorganshire; Wales
- Coordinates: 51.678148°N 3.783077°W
- Platforms: 1

Other information
- Status: Disused

History
- Original company: Great Western Railway

Key dates
- 1 August 1929: Opened
- 15 October 1962: Closed
Location

Penscynor Halt railway station served the village of Cilfrew, in the historical county of Glamorganshire, Wales, from 1929 to 1962 on the Neath and Brecon Railway.

== History ==
The station was opened on 1 August 1929 by the Great Western Railway. It closed on 15 October 1962.

Preceding station	Historical railways	Following station
Cilfrew; Line open, station closed	Great Western Railway; Neath and Brecon Railway	Cadoxton Terrace Halt; Line open, station closed
