= Cwmneol Halt railway station =

Disused railway station in Cwmaman, Rhondda Cynon Taf

Cwmneol Halt

General information
- Location: Cwmaman, Glamorganshire; Wales
- Coordinates: 51.690461°N 3.438209°W

Other information
- Status: Disused

History
- Original company: Great Western Railway
- Pre-grouping: Great Western Railway
- Post-grouping: Great Western Railway

Key dates
- 1903: Opened to miners
- 1 January 1906: Opened to the public
- 22 November 1917: Closed
- 7 July 1919: Reopened
- 22 September 1924: Closed to passengers
- 1932: Closed to miners
Location

Cwmneol Halt railway station co-served the village of Cwmaman, in the historical county of Glamorganshire, Wales, from 1906 to 1932 on the Vale of Neath Railway.

== History ==
The station was opened to the public on 1 January 1906, although it opened to miners in 1903. It closed on 22 November 1917, although miners continued to use it. It reopened on 7 July 1919 before closing to the public on 22 September 1924. It closed to miners in 1932.

Preceding station	Disused railways	Following station
Cwmaman Crossing Halt; Line and station closed	Great Western Railway; Vale of Neath Railway	Godreaman Halt; Line and station closed
