= Celynen North Halt railway station =

Disused railway station in Wales

Celynen North Halt

General information
- Location: Abercarn, Glamorganshire; Wales
- Coordinates: 51.671°N 3.1397°W
- Grid reference: ST212975
- Platforms: 1

Other information
- Status: Disused

History
- Original company: Great Western Railway

Key dates
- 10 August 1936: Opened
- 30 April 1962: Closed
Location

Celynen North Halt railway station served the town of Abercarn, in the historical county of Glamorganshire, from 1936 to 1962 on the Monmouthshire Railway.

== History ==
The station was opened on 10 August 1936 by the Great Western Railway. It didn't appear in the timetable as it was only open to the miners of the nearby Celynen Colliery. It closed on 30 April 1962.

Preceding station	Historical railways	Following station
Crumlin Low Level; Line open, station closed	Great Western Railway; Monmouthshire Railway	Newbridge; Line and station open
