= Cilfrew railway station =

Disused railway station in Cilfrew, Neath Port Talbot

Cilfrew
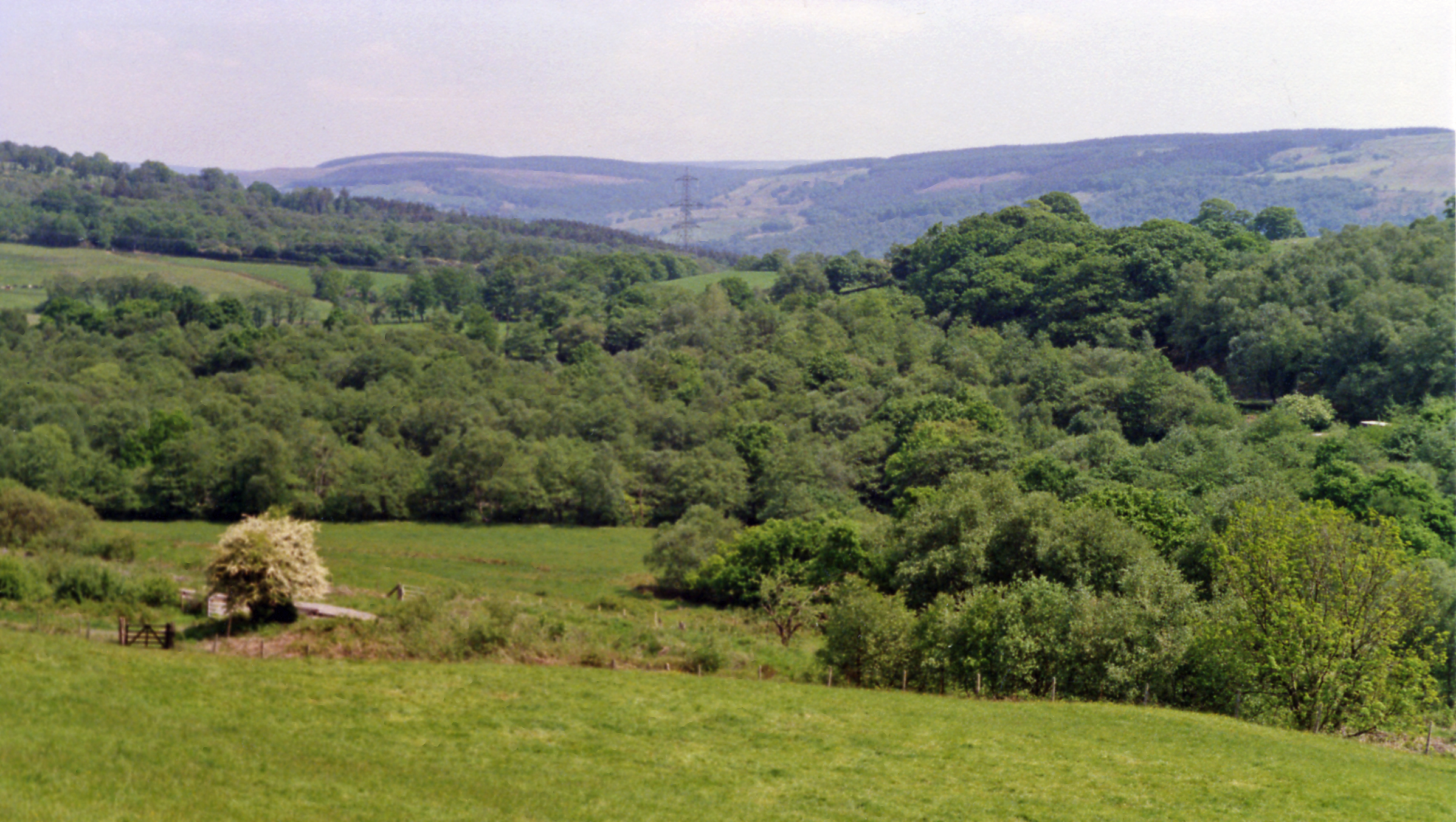
- The site of the station in 1990

General information
- Location: Cilfrew, Glamorgan; Wales
- Coordinates: 51.688°N 3.7779°W
- Grid reference: SN772003
- Platforms: 1

Other information
- Status: Disused

History
- Original company: Neath and Brecon Railway
- Post-grouping: Great Western Railway

Key dates
- December 1888: Opened
- 15 October 1962: Closed
Location
- Location within Wales Location within the United Kingdom

Cilfrew railway station served the village of Cilfrew, in the historical county of Glamorgan, Wales, from 1888 to 1962 on the Neath and Brecon Railway.

== History ==
The station first appeared in Bradshaw in December 1888, although it appeared in an advert on 20 September 1887. There were only services on Wednesdays and Saturdays when it first opened but a full service was introduced in January 1892. It was also known as Cilfrew Platform in Bradshaw until December 1894. A report claimed that the platform was rotten in 1893 and it drew in a lot of complaints. The Neath and Brecon Railway company apologised, saying that it should have only been open to miners. A new platform was built on 1 May 1895. The station closed on 15 October 1962.

| Preceding station | Disused railways | Following station |
|---|---|---|
| Cefn Coed Colliery Halt; Line and station closed | Neath and Brecon Railway | Penscynor Halt; Line and station closed |
