= Mountain Ash Cardiff Road railway station =

Disused railway station in Mountain Ash, Rhondda Cynon Taf

Mountain Ash Cardiff Road

General information
- Location: Mountain Ash, Rhondda Cynon Taf; Wales
- Coordinates: 51.6836°N 3.3771°W
- Grid reference: ST048992

Other information
- Status: Disused

History
- Original company: Taff Vale Railway
- Pre-grouping: Taff Vale Railway
- Post-grouping: Great Western Railway

Key dates
- 5 October 1864: Opened as Mountain Ash
- 1 July 1924: Name changed To Mountain Ash Cardiff Road
- 15 June 1964: Closed
Location

Mountain Ash Cardiff Road railway station served the town of Mountain Ash, Rhondda Cynon Taf, Wales, from 1864 to 1964 on the Vale of Neath Railway.

== History ==
The station was opened as Mountain Ash on 5 October 1864 by the Taff Vale Railway. Its name was changed to Mountain Ash Cardiff Road on 1 July 1924. It closed on 15 June 1964.

Preceding station	Disused railways	Following station
Penrhiwceiber High Level; Line and station closed	Taff Vale Railway; Vale of Neath Railway	Duffryn Crossing Halt; Line and station closed
