= Peterborough Crescent railway station =

Former railway station in England

Peterborough Crescent

General information
- Location: Peterborough, Soke of Peterborough, Northamptonshire; England
- Coordinates: 52.5726°N 0.2491°W
- Grid reference: TL187986
- Platforms: 2

Other information
- Status: Disused

History
- Pre-grouping: Midland Railway

Key dates
- 1 February 1858: Opened
- 1 August 1866: Closed
Location

Peterborough Crescent was a railway station serving the city of Peterborough, England. The station opened in 1858 but closed in 1866. The station was served by Midland Railway from the Syston to Peterborough Line.

== Services ==
| Preceding station | Historical railways | Following station |
|---|---|---|
| Walton | Midland Railway; Syston to Peterborough Line | Peterborough East |
