= Crynant New Colliery Halt railway station =

Disused railway station in Crynant, Neath Port Talbot

Coordinates: 51.74426°N 3.73753°W

Crynant New Colliery Halt

General information
- Location: Crynant, Glamorganshire; Wales

Other information
- Status: Disused

History
- Original company: Great Western Railway

Key dates
- September 1938: Opened
- 1954: Closed

Crynant New Colliery Halt railway station served the colliery in the village of Crynant, in the historical county of Glamorganshire, Wales, from 1938 to 1954 on the Neath and Brecon Railway.

== History ==
The station was opened in September 1938 by the Great Western Railway. It didn't appear in the timetable as it was only open to the miners of the nearby Crynant Colliery. It closed in 1954.

Preceding station	Historical railways	Following station
Dillwyn and Brynteg Halt; Line open, station closed	Great Western Railway; Neath and Brecon Railway	Crynant Colliery Halt; Line open, station closed
