= Cilfynydd railway station =

Disused railway station in Cilfynydd, Rhondda Cynon Taf

Coordinates: 51.6240°N 3.3228°W

Cilfynydd

General information
- Location: Cilfynydd, Glamorganshire; Wales

Other information
- Status: Disused

History
- Original company: Taff Vale Railway
- Pre-grouping: Taff Vale Railway
- Post-grouping: Great Western Railway

Key dates
- 1 June 1900: Opened
- 12 September 1932: Closed
Location

Cilfynydd railway station served the village of Cilfynydd, in the historical county of Glamorganshire, Wales, from 1900 to 1932 on the Pont Shon Norton Branch.

== History ==
The station was opened on 1 June 1900 by the Taff Vale Railway. It closed on 12 September 1932. Nothing remains besides the viaduct.

| Preceding station | Disused railways | Following station |
|---|---|---|
| Traveller's Rest; Line and station closed | Pont Shon Norton Branch | Coedpenmaen; Line and station closed |
