= Cwmaman Colliery Halt railway station =

Disused railway station in Cwmaman, Rhondda Cynon Taf

Cwmaman Colliery Halt

General information
- Location: Cwmaman, Glamorganshire; Wales
- Coordinates: 51.6949°N 3.4284°W
- Grid reference: SO013005
- Platforms: 1

Other information
- Status: Disused

History
- Original company: Great Western Railway
- Pre-grouping: Great Western Railway
- Post-grouping: Great Western Railway

Key dates
- 1903: Opened to workers
- 1 January 1906: Opened to passengers
- 22 September 1924: Closed to passengers
- 1932: Closed completely
Location

Cwmaman Colliery Halt railway station served the village of Cwmaman, in the historical county of Glamorganshire, Wales, from 1906 to 1932 on the Vale of Neath Railway.

== History ==
The station was opened to the workers of the nearby Cwmaman Colliery in 1903 by the Great Western Railway. It opened to regular passenger traffic on 1 January 1906 and closed to passengers on 22 September 1924. It closed to workers in 1932.

| Preceding station | Disused railways | Following station |
|---|---|---|
| Terminus | Great Western Railway; Vale of Neath Railway | Cwmaman Crossing Halt; Line and station closed |
