= Chester Junction Golf Club Platform railway station =

Disused railway station in Chester, Cheshire

Chester Junction Golf Club Platform

General information
- Location: Deeside; Wales
- Coordinates: 53.2241°N 3.0189°W
- Grid reference: SJ320701
- Platforms: 2

Other information
- Status: Disused

History
- Original company: Manchester, Sheffield & Lincolnshire Railway
- Pre-grouping: Great Central Railway
- Post-grouping: London & North Eastern Railway

Key dates
- 18 May 1896: Opened
- 20 September 1927: Closed
Location

Chester Junction Golf Club Platform served Chester Golf Club in Deeside, Flintshire, Wales, from 1896 to 1927 on the Chester & Connah's Quay Railway.

== History ==
The station was opened on 18 May 1896 by the Manchester, Sheffield & Lincolnshire Railway. It was situated to the east of what was Chester Junction, now part of the Dee Marshes cycling route. On the southbound platform was a waiting shelter as well as a signal box. To the northwest was the golf club that this station was named after. It wasn't shown in public timetables as it was only used by members of the nearby golf club. The station closed on 20 September 1927. The site was converted into a cycle path in 2000.

Preceding station	Disused railways	Following station
Shotton; Line closed, station open	Chester & Connah's Quay Railway; Manchester, Sheffield & Lincolnshire Railway	Saughall; Line and station closed
