= Cwmaman Crossing Halt railway station =

Short-lived railway station in Cwmaman, Rhondda Cynon Taf

Cwmaman

General information
- Location: Cwmaman, Glamorganshire; Wales
- Coordinates: 51.6956°N 3.4254°W
- Grid reference: SO015006
- Platforms: 2

Other information
- Status: Disused

History
- Original company: Great Western Railway
- Pre-grouping: Great Western Railway
- Post-grouping: Great Western Railway

Key dates
- 1 January 1906: Opened
- 22 September 1924: Closed to passengers
- 1932: Closed completely
Location

Cwmaman Crossing Halt railway station served the village of Cwmaman, in the historical county of Glamorganshire, Wales, from 1906 to 1932 on the Vale of Neath Railway.

== History ==
The station was opened on 1 January 1906 by the Great Western Railway. It was a short-lived station, closing to passengers on 22 September 1924 and closing to the workers of the nearby colliery in 1932.

Preceding station	Disused railways	Following station
Cwmaman Colliery Halt; Line and station closed	Great Western Railway; Vale of Neath Railway	Cwmneol Halt; Line and station closed
