= Cadoxton Terrace Halt railway station =

Disused railway station in Cadoxton-juxta-Neath, Neath Port Talbot

Cadoxton Terrace Halt

General information
- Location: Cadoxton-juxta-Neath, Glamorganshire; Wales
- Coordinates: 51.6753°N 3.7921°W
- Grid reference: SS761989
- Platforms: 1

Other information
- Status: Disused

History
- Original company: Great Western Railway

Key dates
- 18 March 1929: Opened
- 15 October 1962: Closed
Location

Cadoxton Terrace Halt railway station served the village of Cadoxton-juxta-Neath, in the historical county of Glamorganshire, Wales, from 1929 to 1964 on the Neath and Brecon Railway.

== History ==
The station was opened on 18 March 1929 by Great Western Railway. It closed on 15 October 1962.

Preceding station	Disused railways	Following station
Penscynor Halt; Line and station closed	Great Western Railway; Neath and Brecon Railway	Neath Riverside; Line and station closed
