= Conway Marsh railway station =

Disused railway station in Conwy, Wales

Conway Marsh

General information
- Location: Conwy, Conwy County Borough (then Denbighshire); Wales
- Coordinates: 53.2868°N 3.8525°W
- Grid reference: SH765783
- Platforms: 2

Other information
- Status: Disused

History
- Original company: London and North Western Railway
- Pre-grouping: London and North Western Railway
- Post-grouping: London, Midland and Scottish Railway

Key dates
- 12 May 1894: Opened
- August 1929: Closed

Conway Marsh railway station (later known as Conway Morfa) was located about a mile north west of Conwy, Wales (Conway being the then English spelling for the town).

== History ==
The station opened as Conway Marsh (but did not appear in the timetables) on 12 May 1894 by the London and North Western Railway on its Chester and Holyhead route to serve an Army training camp and rifle range on the marsh to the north of the line.

The station was relocated on 2 May 1901 and renamed Conway Morfa. The station was situated on a loop of the north side of the line, there was a siding and a signal box.

The station ceased to be used in 1929, and has since been demolished.

Despite being closed the station site was used for 18 LMS caravans in 1937 and 1938 followed by 30 caravans in 1939.

Preceding station	Historical railways	Following station
Conwy; Line open; station open	London and North Western Railway; North Wales Coast Line	Penmaenmawr; Line open; station open

== Bibliography ==
- McRae, Andrew (1997). British Railway Camping Coach Holidays: The 1930s & British Railways (London Midland Region). Vol. Scenes from the Past: 30 (Part One). Foxline. ISBN 1-870119-48-7.
- Quick, Michael (2022) [2001]. Railway passenger stations in Great Britain: a chronology (PDF). version 5.04. Railway & Canal Historical Society. Archived from the original (PDF) on 25 November 2022.
