= Cairnhill Bridge railway station =

Former UK railway station

Cairnhill Bridge

General information
- Location: Scotland
- Coordinates: 55.8514°N 3.9959°W
- Line: Monkland and Kirkintilloch Railway

Other information
- Status: Disused

History
- Opened: 10 December 1849
- Closed: 1 January 1850
- Original company: Monkland and Kirkintilloch Railway
Location

Cairnhill Bridge Railway Station was a railway station in Scotland on the Monkland and Kirkintilloch Railway.

The station was opened by the Monkland and Kirkintilloch Railway on 10 December 1849 and closed on 1 January 1850.
