= Coppenhall railway station =

Former railway station in England

Coppenhall

General information
- Location: Crewe, Cheshire East; England
- Coordinates: 53.1126°N 2.4461°W

Other information
- Status: Disused

History
- Original company: Grand Junction Railway

Key dates
- 4 July 1837: Station opened
- 10 September 1840: Station closed
Location

Coppenhall railway station was a station on the Grand Junction Railway in Cheshire.

It opened in 1837, and closed in 1840. No substantive remains exist as of 2015.

Preceding station	Historical railways	Following station
Crewe	London and North Western Railway; Grand Junction Railway	Minshull Vernon
