= Birstall railway station (West Yorkshire) =

Disused railway station in Birstall, West Yorkshire

Coordinates: 53.7295°N 1.6603°W

Birstall
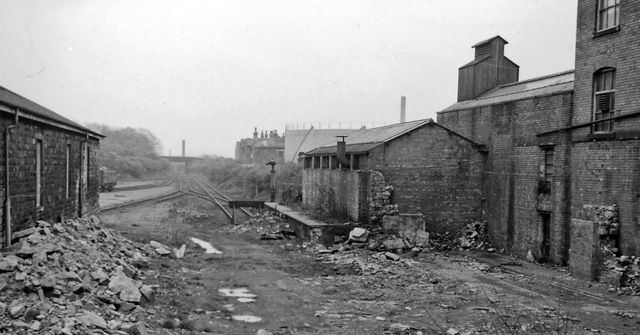

General information
- Location: Birstall, West Riding of Yorkshire; England
- Platforms: 1

Other information
- Status: Disused

History
- Original company: London and North Western Railway
- Pre-grouping: London and North Western Railway

Key dates
- 13 September 1852: Opened
- 15 April 1917: Closed to passengers as a wartime economy measure
- 1962: Closed to goods
Location

Birstall railway station served the town of Birstall, in the historic county of West Riding of Yorkshire, England, from 1852 to 1962 on the Birstall Branch line.

== History ==
The station was opened on 13 September 1852 by the London and North Western Railway. It closed to passengers as a wartime economy measure on 15 April 1917 but never reopened. Bradshaw showed that the service was suspended instead of closed. It was renamed Birstall Lower after passenger closure. The station remained open for goods traffic until 1962 or 1963.

Preceding station	Disused railways	Following station
Terminus	Birstall Branch line London and North Western Railway	Carlinghow; Line and station closed
