= Neath Canal Side railway station =

Disused railway station in Neath, Neath Port Talbot

Coordinates: 51.6607°N 3.8099°W

Neath Canal Side

General information
- Location: Neath, Glamorganshire; Wales
- Platforms: 1

Other information
- Status: Disused

History
- Original company: Rhondda and Swansea Bay Railway
- Pre-grouping: Rhondda and Swansea Bay Railway
- Post-grouping: Great Western Railway

Key dates
- 14 March 1895: Opened as Neath Canal Side
- 1 July 1924: Name changed to Neath Canal Bridge
- 17 September 1926: Name changed back to Neath Canal Side
- 16 September 1935: Closed
Location

Neath Canal Side railway station served the town of Neath, in the historical county of Glamorganshire, Wales, from 1895 to 1935 on the Rhondda and Swansea Bay Railway.

== History ==
The station was opened as Neath Canal Side on 14 March 1895 by the Rhondda and Swansea Bay Railway. Its name was changed to Neath Canal Bridge on 1 July 1924 but changed back to Neath Canal Side on 17 September 1926. The station closed on 16 September 1935.

Preceding station	Disused railways	Following station
Court Sart; Line and station closed	Rhondda and Swansea Bay Railway	Terminus
