= Coedpenmaen railway station =

Disused railway station in Glamorganshire, Wales

Coedpenmaen

General information
- Location: Coedpenmaen, Glamorganshire; Wales
- Coordinates: 51.6106°N 3.3303°W
- Grid reference: ST079910

Other information
- Status: Disused

History
- Original company: Taff Vale Railway
- Pre-grouping: Taff Vale Railway
- Post-grouping: Great Western Railway

Key dates
- 1 June 1900: Opened
- 1 June 1915: Closed to passengers
- 12 September 1932: Official closure date
Location

Coedpenmaen railway station served the Coedpenmaen district of Pontypridd, Glamorganshire, Wales, from 1900 to 1932 on the Pont Shon Norton Branch.

== History ==
The station was opened on 1 June 1900 by the Taff Vale Railway. The last train was on 1 June 1915 but the station officially closed on 12 September 1932.

Preceding station	Disused railways	Following station
Cilfynydd; Line and station closed	Taff Vale Railway; Pont Shon Norton Branch	Berw Road Halt; Line and station closed
