= Castle Donington and Shardlow railway station =

Former railway station in Leicestershire, England

Castle Donington and Shardlow
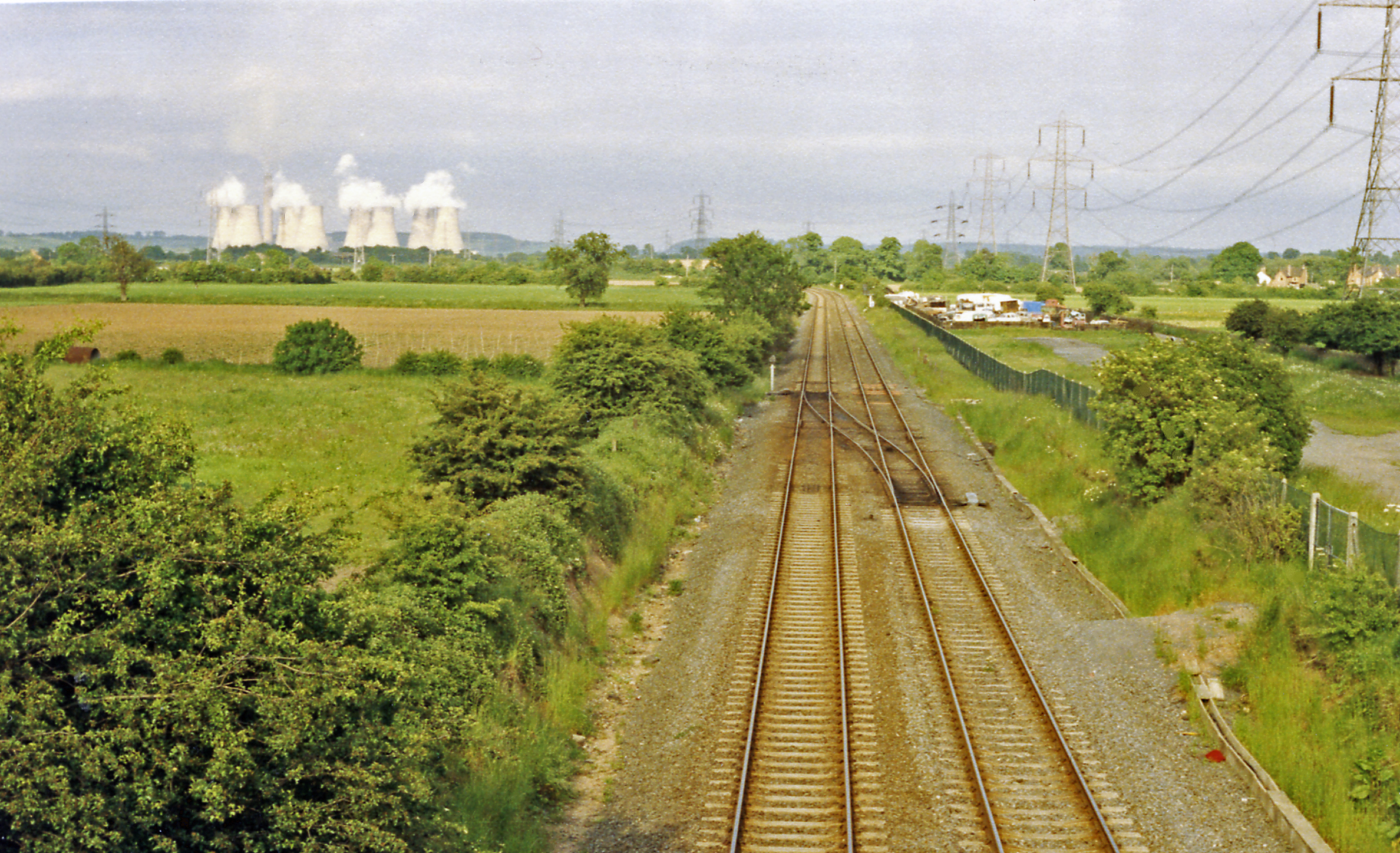
- Site of the station in 1988

General information
- Location: Castle Donington, North West Leicestershire; England
- Coordinates: 52.8526°N 1.3341°W
- Platforms: 2

Other information
- Status: Disused

History
- Original company: Midland Railway
- Pre-grouping: Midland Railway
- Post-grouping: London, Midland and Scottish Railway

Key dates
- 6 December 1869: Opened as Castle Donington
- 13 June 1901: Renamed Castle Donington and Shardlow
- 21 September 1930: Closed for passengers
- 1967: Closed for goods
Location

Castle Donington and Shardlow railway station served the market town of Castle Donington, Leicestershire, and the village of Shardlow, Derbyshire.

== History ==
It opened on 6 December 1869 as Castle Donington, when the Midland Railway opened the Weston, Castle Donington and Trent branch.

It was renamed Castle Donington and Shardlow on 13 June 1901 before being closed to passengers on 21 September 1930. It was closed to freight in 1967 and was demolished soon after.

== Services ==
Preceding station	Disused railways	Following station
Weston on Trent; Line open, station closed	Midland Railway; Castle Donington line	Long Eaton; Line and station open
