= Countess Park railway station =

Disused railway station in Bellingham, Northumberland

Countess Park

General information
- Location: Bellingham, Northumberland; England
- Coordinates: 55.1182°N 2.2032°W
- Grid reference: NY871804
- Platforms: 1

Other information
- Status: Disused

History
- Original company: North British Railway
- Pre-grouping: North British Railway

Key dates
- 1 December 1859: Opened
- 1 February 1861: Closed
Location

Countess Park railway station served the village of Bellingham, Northumberland, England from 1859 to 1861, during the construction of the Border Counties Railway.

== History ==
About 14 miles (23 km) north-west of Hexham, the station was built by the North British Railway (NBR) as an interim terminus for the Border Counties Railway. It opened on 1 December 1859, when a special train was run from Newcastle to mark the occasion, arriving at 11.38 a.m. The station was situated on the south side of an unclassified road between Heugh and High Countess Park, the NBR providing a temporary platform with a run-around loop. It closed entirely on 1 February 1861, when the line was extended northwards to Thorneyburn and Reedsmouth station opened, about a mile from Countess Park. The run-around loop was retained for some years in connection with the transport of sandstone from the nearby Mill Knock Quarry.

== Timetable ==
The July 1860 edition of Bradshaw's Guide shows that from Monday to Saturday, four trains ran from Hexham to Countess Park, with three in the reverse direction. On Sunday services only ran between Hexham and Wark.

Preceding station	Disused railways	Following station
Reedsmouth; Line and station closed	North British Railway; Border Counties Railway	Wark; Line and station closed
