= Cefn Coed Colliery Halt railway station =

Disused railway station in Crynant, Neath Port Talbot

Cefn Coed Colliery Halt

General information
- Location: Crynant, Glamorganshire; Wales
- Coordinates: 51.717262°N 3.759591°W
- Platforms: 1

Other information
- Status: Disused

History
- Original company: Great Western Railway

Key dates
- 8 September 1930: Opened
- 15 October 1962: Closed
Location

Cefn Coed Colliery Halt railway station served the village of Crynant, in the historical county of Glamorganshire, Wales, from 1930 to 1962 on the Neath and Brecon Railway.

== History ==
The station was opened on 8 September 1930 by the Great Western Railway. It closed on 15 October 1962.

Preceding station	Disused railways	Following station
Crynant; Line and station closed	Great Western Railway; Neath and Brecon Railway	Cilfrew; Line and station closed
