= Cambusnethan railway station =

Short-lived railway station in Cambusnethan, North Lanarkshire

Coordinates: 55.7780°N 3.8926°W

Cambusnethan

General information
- Location: Cambusnethan, North Lanarkshire; Scotland
- Platforms: 1

Other information
- Status: Disused

History
- Original company: Caledonian Railway
- Pre-grouping: Caledonian Railway

Key dates
- 1 October 1901: Opened
- 1 January 1917: Closed
Location

Cambusnethan railway station served the village of Cambusnethan, North Lanarkshire, Scotland, from 1901 to 1917 on the Wishaw, Cambusnethan and Coltness Railway.

== History ==
The station was opened on 1 October 1901 by the Caledonian Railway. To the west was the goods yard and at the west end of the platform was the signal box. The station closed on 1 January 1917.
