= Commercial Dock railway station =

Former railway station in England

Commercial Dock
- Interactive map of Commercial Dock

General information
- Location: Bermondsey
- Local authority: London Borough of Southwark
- Owner: London and Greenwich Railway

Key dates
- 1856: Earliest possible opening date
- 1867: Closed

Other information
- Coordinates: 51.4894°N 0.0526°W

Commercial Dock was a railway station in Rotherhithe, south-east London, on the London and Greenwich Railway. It was situated on approximately the same site as the later Southwark Park railway station. Numerous sources disagree over when Commercial Dock station was opened, with July 1856, 1859, or 1867 being possibilities; it closed in 1867. No visible trace of the station remains.

== Name ==
There has been some doubt about the correct name of the station, which was not located particularly close to the dock of the Commercial Dock Company, which merged with the Surrey Docks to form the Surrey Commercial Docks in 1865, with different sources giving the station name as either "Commercial Dock" or "Commercial Docks". Course states the name as "Commercial Dock"; Marshall states "Commercial Dock" on page 364 of his book but "Commercial Docks" on page 523; Whitbread's Map Of London 1865, two years before the station closed, has the name abbreviated to "Commercial Dk Stn", suggesting that "Commercial Dock" is correct. Stanford's School-Board Map of London of circa 1872 has "Commercial Docks Station", though this would have been produced after the station had closed. Butt also states "Docks". A report by the Board of Trade referring to an accident near the station on 15 December 1860 uses "Commercial Dock Station", and includes the text of a letter dated 25 January 1861 from the Secretary of the South Eastern Railway, which uses the phrase "...Commercial Dock Station of the Greenwich Railway..." and from this it is reasonable to conclude that the correct name was Commercial Dock.
