= Carlton on Trent railway station =

Former railway station in Nottinghamshire, England

Carlton on Trent
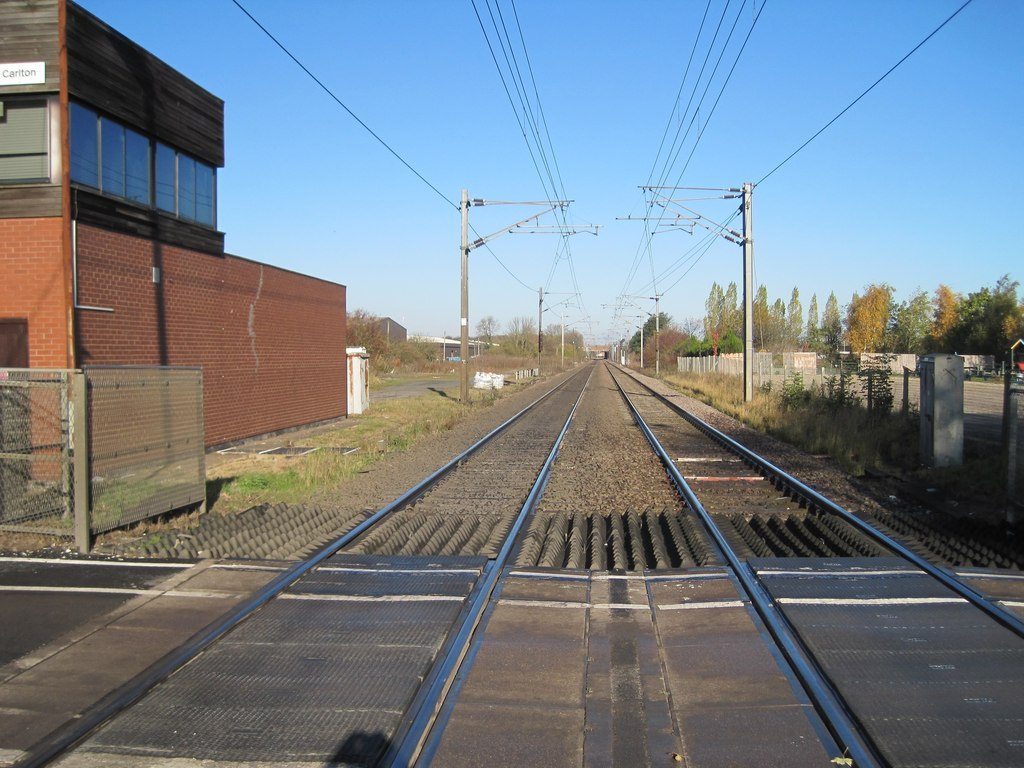
- The site of the station, looking north towards Retford, in 2012

General information
- Location: Carlton-on-Trent, Nottinghamshire; England
- Coordinates: 53.1699°N 0.8152°W
- Grid reference: SK793643
- Platforms: 2

Other information
- Status: Disused

History
- Original company: Great Northern Railway
- Pre-grouping: Great Northern Railway
- Post-grouping: LNER

Key dates
- 15 July 1852: Opened as Carlton
- 1 March 1881: Name changed to Carlton-on-Trent
- 2 March 1953: Closed
Location

Carlton on Trent railway station served the village of Carlton-on-Trent, Nottinghamshire, England from 1852 to 1953 on the East Coast Main Line.

== History ==
The station was opened as Carlton on 15 July 1852 by the Great Northern Railway. 'On-trent' was added to its name on 1 March 1881. It closed to both passengers and goods traffic on 2 March 1953.

Preceding station	Historical railways	Following station
Crow Park; Line open, station closed	Great Northern Railway; East Coast Main Line	Newark North Gate
