= Crow Park railway station =

Former railway station in Nottinghamshire, England

Crow Park
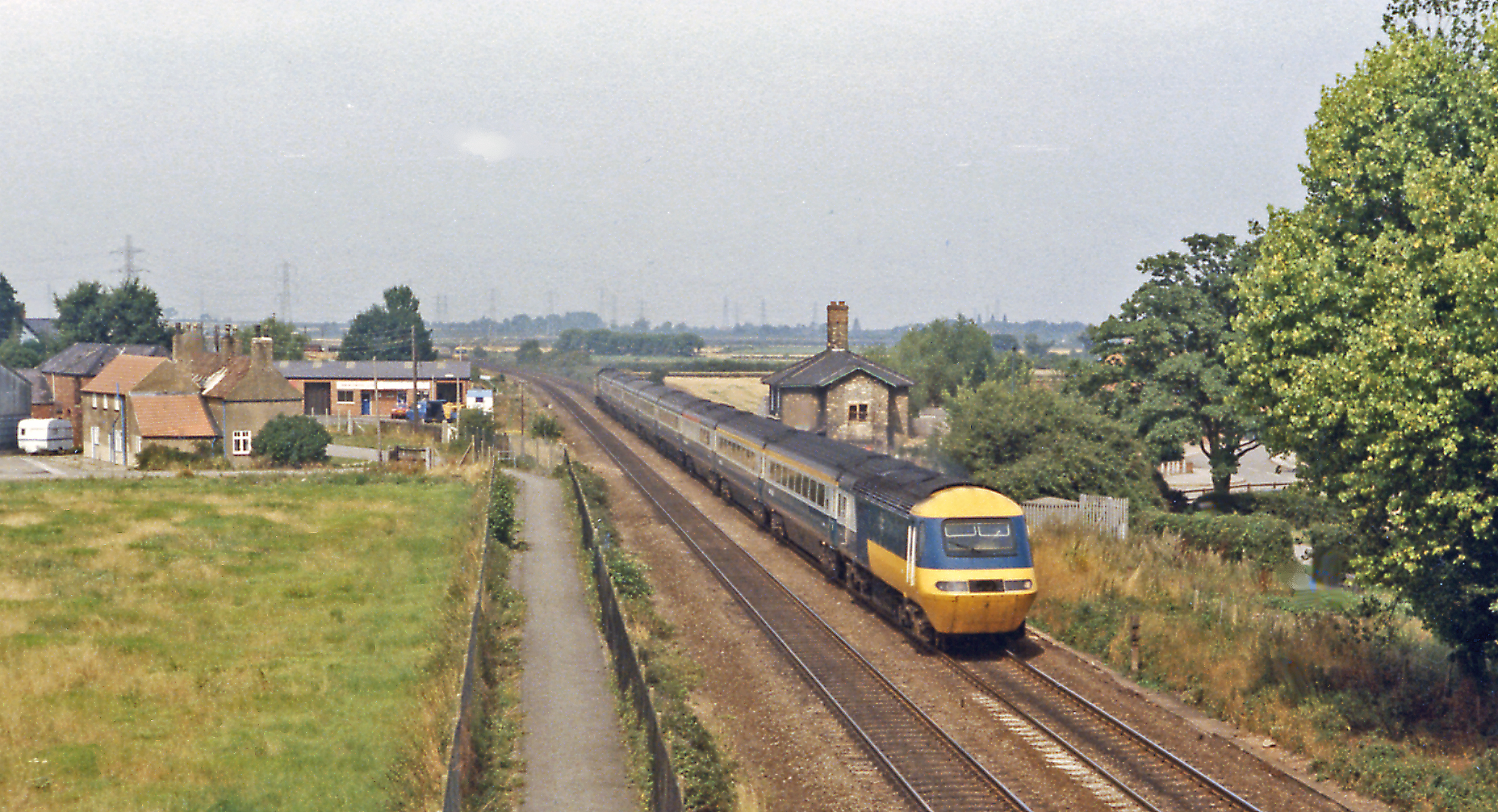
- Crow Park station site

General information
- Location: Sutton-on-Trent, Nottinghamshire; England
- Coordinates: 53.1843°N 0.8163°W
- Grid reference: SK792659
- Platforms: 2

Other information
- Status: Disused

History
- Original company: Great Northern Railway
- Pre-grouping: Great Northern Railway
- Post-grouping: LNER

Key dates
- 1 November 1882: Opened
- 6 October 1958: Closed to passengers
- 1964: Closed to goods
Location

Crow Park railway station served the village of Sutton-on-Trent, Nottinghamshire, England from 1882 to 1964 on the East Coast Main Line.

== History ==
The station opened on 1 November 1882 by the Great Northern Railway. It closed to passengers on 6 October 1958 and closed to goods traffic in 1964.

Preceding station	Historical railways	Following station
Dukeries Junction; Line open, station closed	Great Northern Railway; East Coast Main Line	Carlton on Trent; Line open, station closed
