= Port Carlisle Junction =

Disused railway station in Cumbria, England

Coordinates: 54.8980°N 2.9588°W

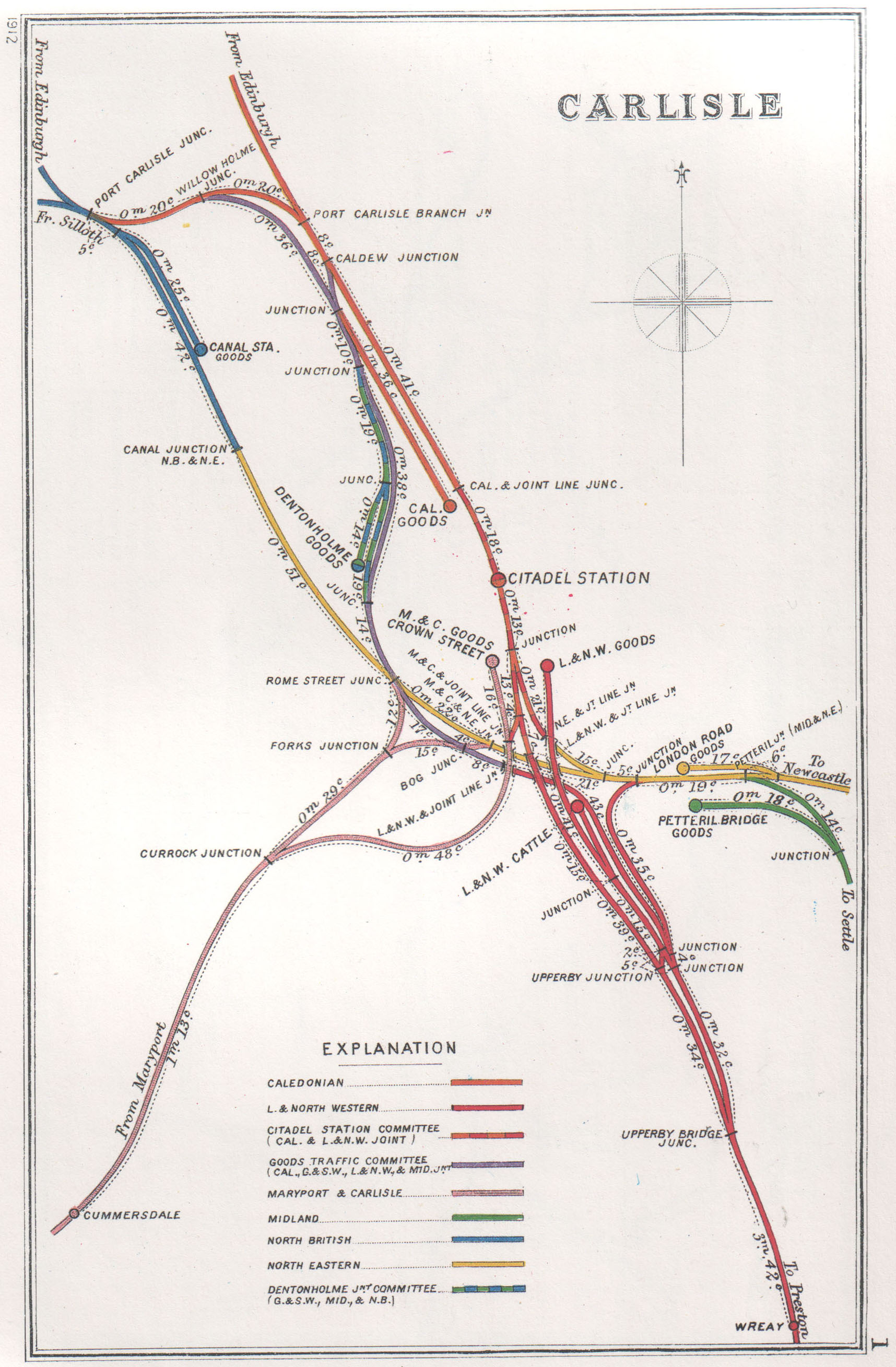
A 1912 Railway Clearing House Junction Diagram showing Port Carlisle Junction (upper left)

Port Carlisle Junction was a railway junction between the lines of the former Caledonian Railway and North British Railway companies lines to the north of Carlisle Citadel station in, what is now, Cumbria, England. It opened in July 1863. Port Carlisle Junction railway station was a very short lived station that first came into use in July 1863 and there was some untimetabled use until 29 October 1863, but the station closed as early as 1 July 1864. After closure, the up (northbound) platform was retained for use by those crews requiring change and also for passing messages on to crews.
