= Coldharbour Halt railway station =

Disused railway station in Coldharbour, Devon

Coldharbour Halt

General information
- Location: Coldharbour, Devon; England
- Coordinates: 50.9007°N 3.3353°W
- Grid reference: ST062121
- Platforms: 1

Other information
- Status: Disused

History
- Original company: Great Western Railway
- Post-grouping: Great Western Railway

Key dates
- 23 February 1929: Opened
- 9 September 1963: Closed
Location

Coldharbour Halt railway station was a small station from 1929 to 1963 on the Culm Valley Light Railway.

== History ==
The station was opened on 23 February 1929 by the Great Western Railway. It was situated on the west side of Coldharbour. It was known as Cold Harbour Halt in the handbook of stations until 1956. It had a siding behind the platform and a signal box at the south end of the platform. This controlled the siding and the level crossing. The station closed on 9 September 1963. The station was demolished after closure and the site became a car park.
