= Berw Road Halt railway station =

Disused railway station in Trallwn, Rhondda Cynon Taf

Berw Road Halt

General information
- Location: Trallwn, Glamorganshire; Wales
- Coordinates: 51.6108°N 3.334°W
- Grid reference: ST077910

Other information
- Status: Disused

History
- Original company: Taff Vale Railway
- Pre-grouping: Taff Vale Railway
- Post-grouping: Great Western Railway

Key dates
- 17 October 1904: Opened as Berw Road Platform
- 1 July 1906: Closed
- July 1908: Reopened
- 2 October 1922: Name changed to Berw Road Halt
- 12 September 1932: Closed
Location

Berw Road Halt railway station served the district of Trallwn (Welsh: Trallwng), in Pontypridd, in the historical county of Glamorganshire, Wales, from 1904 to 1932 on the Pont Shon Norton Branch.

== History ==
The station was opened as Berw Road Platform on 17 October 1904 by the Taff Vale Railway. It closed on 1 July 1906 but later reopened on a different site in July 1908, although the company notice of 10 September 1907 said that it was ready for use. Its name was changed to Berw Road Halt on 2 October 1922. It closed on 12 September 1932.

Preceding station	Disused railways	Following station
Coedpenmaen; Line and station closed	Taff Vale Railway	Pontypridd; Line closed, station open
