= Court Sart railway station =

Disused railway station in Briton Ferry, Wales

Coordinates: 51.6426°N 3.8186°W

Court Sart

General information
- Location: Briton Ferry, Glamorganshire; Wales
- Platforms: 2

Other information
- Status: Disused

History
- Original company: Rhondda and Swansea Bay Railway
- Pre-grouping: Rhondda and Swansea Bay Railway
- Post-grouping: Great Western Railway

Key dates
- 14 March 1895: Opened
- 16 September 1935: Closed
Location

Court Sart railway station served the town of Briton Ferry, Wales, from 1895 to 1935 on the Rhondda and Swansea Bay Railway.

== History ==
The station was opened on 14 March 1895 by the Rhondda and Swansea Bay Railway. It closed on 16 September 1935.

Preceding station	Disused railways	Following station
Briton Ferry East; Line and station closed	Rhondda and Swansea Bay Railway	Neath Canal Side; Line and station closed
