= Cwmsyfiog Halt railway station =

Disused railway station in Cwmsyfiog, Caerphilly

Coordinates: 51°42′29″N 3°13′29″W

Cwmsyfiog Halt

General information
- Location: Cwmsyfiog, Monmouthshire; Wales
- Platforms: 1

Other information
- Status: Disused

History
- Original company: Great Western Railway
- Post-grouping: Great Western Railway

Key dates
- 1 February 1908: First station opened as Cwmsyfiog and Brithdir
- 1 July 1924: Name changed to Cwmsyfiog
- 5 July 1937: First station closed to passengers and second station opened
- 6 December 1937: First station reopened to miners
- 31 December 1962: First and second station closed permanently
Location

Cwmsyfiog Halt railway station served the suburb of Cwmsyfiog, Monmouthshire, Wales, from 1937 to 1962 on the Brecon and Merthyr Tydfil Junction Railway.

== History ==
The first station opened as Cwmsyfiog and Brithdir on 1 February 1908 by the Brecon and Merthyr Tydfil Junction Railway. Its name was changed to Cwmsyfiog on 1 July 1924. It closed to passengers on 5 July 1937. The second station opened on the same day. While the first station was closed, it reopened to miners only on 6 December 1937. The second station closed on 31 December 1962 and the first station closed to miners on the same day.

Preceding station	Disused railways	Following station
Elliot Pit Halt; Line and station closed	Brecon and Merthyr Tydfil Junction Railway; Rumney Railway	Cwmsyfiog & Brithdir; Line and station closed
