= Congleton Upper Junction railway station =

Former UK railway station

Coordinates: 53.1651°N 2.1807°W

Congleton Upper Junction

General information
- Location: Congleton, Cheshire East; England
- Line: Stoke on Trent to Congleton loop line

Other information
- Status: Disused

History
- Opened: 1 June 1864
- Closed: June 1864
- Original company: North Staffordshire Railway

Congleton Upper Junction was a railway station which served the town of Congleton. The station was on the Stoke on Trent to Congleton loop line.

The station was opened by the North Staffordshire Railway on 1 June 1864 and closed a few days later.
