= Ynysybwl branch line railway =

Former Welsh railway

The Ynysybwl branch line railway, formally known as the Clydach Valley Branch, was opened by the Taff Vale Railway company in 1885 to serve collieries that were expected to open in the Clydach Valley, Glamorganshire, South Wales. The branch line made a junction with the main line of the Taff Vale Railway at Stormstown, between Pontypridd and Abercynon (the station was then called Aberdare Junction). In fact the colliery development was limited, but the Lady Windsor Colliery became productive in 1886 and had a large output.

A passenger service to Ynysybwl was started in 1890, but it was not until the introduction of "motor cars", steam railmotor units that could stop at low-cost stopping places, and a diversion of the main line terminal to Pontypridd, that the passenger service was successful. The "Clydach Court Loop" was built to enable direct running to Pontypridd.

Nevertheless, the passenger income declined after 1918 and it was discontinued after 26 July 1952. Lady Windsor Colliery closed in 1988 resulting in the total closure of the branch line.

== Taff Vale Railway main line ==
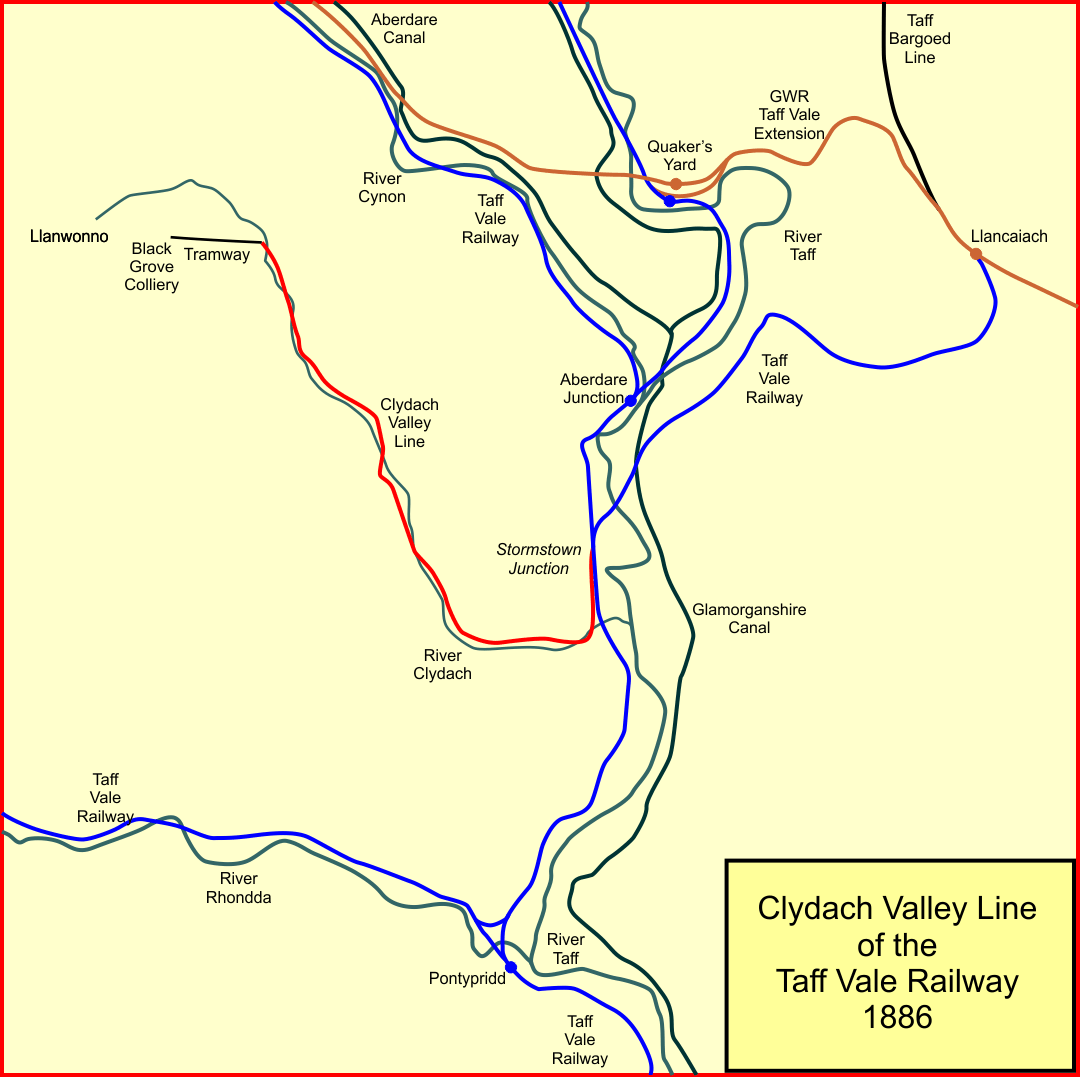
The Ynysybwl branch line

The Taff Vale Railway was authorised by Taff Vale Railway Act 1836 (6 & 7 Will. 4. c. lxxxii), with the principal objective of conveying the iron production of Merthyr and Dowlais to Cardiff for onward transport by ship; in addition there were connections to certain collieries, and the carriage of passengers was permitted. It was a standard gauge railway, engineered by Isambard Kingdom Brunel.

In fact the iron production at Merthyr was not as buoyant as was anticipated, but coal production expanded very considerably in the early days of the Taff Vale Railway Company, and by the time the first main line opened to the public, on 9 October 1840, it was obvious that connecting to collieries off the original route was to be a priority.

New branches in to the Aberdare valley and the Rhondda were constructed, as well as numerous shorter connections to collieries close to those lines, and near the main line itself.

== Authorisation ==
In the frenzied atmosphere of the Railway Mania, a huge number of railway schemes were put forward, many with little justification. The Taff Vale Railway presented a parliamentary bill in the 1846 session which included a proposed railway to a waterfall at Pistyll-goleu, near the present day Clydach reservoir, close to Llanwonno in the Clydach Valley. The gradients necessary to reach the chosen destination were difficult, and the technology of the day would have required operation partly by self-acting incline. The TVR already had one of these on its main line. The £59,204 estimated cost of the line and dubious benefits resulted in this scheme not progressing further.

By 1872 colliery growth in the Rhondda, not far away, was remarkably rapid, and it appeared likely that the Clydach Valley had potential too, and the decision was taken to build a branch line to handle the anticipated traffic. It was to run from near Llanwonno to a triangular junction with the TVR north of Pontypridd. In the 1873 session of Parliament this proposal, coupled with works on the existing Llancaiach line, was authorised by the Taff Vale Railway Act 1873 (36 & 37 Vict. c. clviii).

== Construction delayed ==
The proposed branch was speculative, in the sense that large scale mineral output was not yet taking place at the mines to be served, and the TVR delayed construction of the line accordingly. In fact an extension of the time allowed had to be sought in 1877 and it was October 1880 before a contract was let, to J. E. Billups. Nevertheless, mining activity in the area was limited, with only the Mynachdy and Black Grove collieries providing business at this stage.

The line probably opened in 1885.

== Collieries ==
Towards the end of 1884 a company called Davies, Scott and Company was formed to undertake more ambitious mining work. A pit, to be named the Lady Windsor Colliery, was to be sunk, and this was done in 1885, with commercial output starting at the end of 1886. The pit proved successful and its production was on a large scale: it employed 891 men in 1890. A general goods depot was opened at Ynysybwl by July 1886. The considerable increase in mineral traffic overwhelmed the capacity of the branch facilities, and at the same time a request for a passenger service was submitted.

The branch was extremely steeply graded as its extremity was approached, reaching 1 in 30, and for many years trains were propelled beyond Mynachdy for safety reasons.

== Developments on the branch ==
In June 1897 the TVR board gave instructions for the improvements on the branch to be designed. A station was to be provided at Ynysybwl, and the cramped location was to be expanded by diverting the River Clydach in tunnel for a short distance, giving over the released land to the station facilities. The track layout at Stormstown Junction consisted only of access from the sidings there, and passenger operation would require a full junction. This was duly provided and a passenger service was operated from 1 January 1890, between Aberdare Junction (renamed Abercynon from 1 December 1896) and Ynysybwl. There were three passenger trains in each direction.

The northward connection on to the main line required passengers to travel to Abercynon and change trains there; the principal flow was to Pontypridd, so that the journey was considerably lengthened, and involved an unwelcome change of trains. This was obviously inconvenient, and on date, the TVR obtained an Act authorising a south curve a Stormstown, that came to be called the Clydach Court Loop. The junction at the Ynysybwl apex of the triangle was at Lady Windsor Passing Siding, some distance to the west, the original main line and the extension of the new south chord running side by side for some distance to that point. The work was finished by May 1900.

In fact the company put off the introduction of passenger trains over the new curve. The TVR had concerns about the capacity of Pontypridd station to handle additional traffic, as it was inadequate at the time. The TVR was also concerned about a proposed passenger tramcar service that it feared would harm the viability of the line to Nelson, and it gave priority to that service in preference to the Ynysybwl trains.

== Motor car trains ==
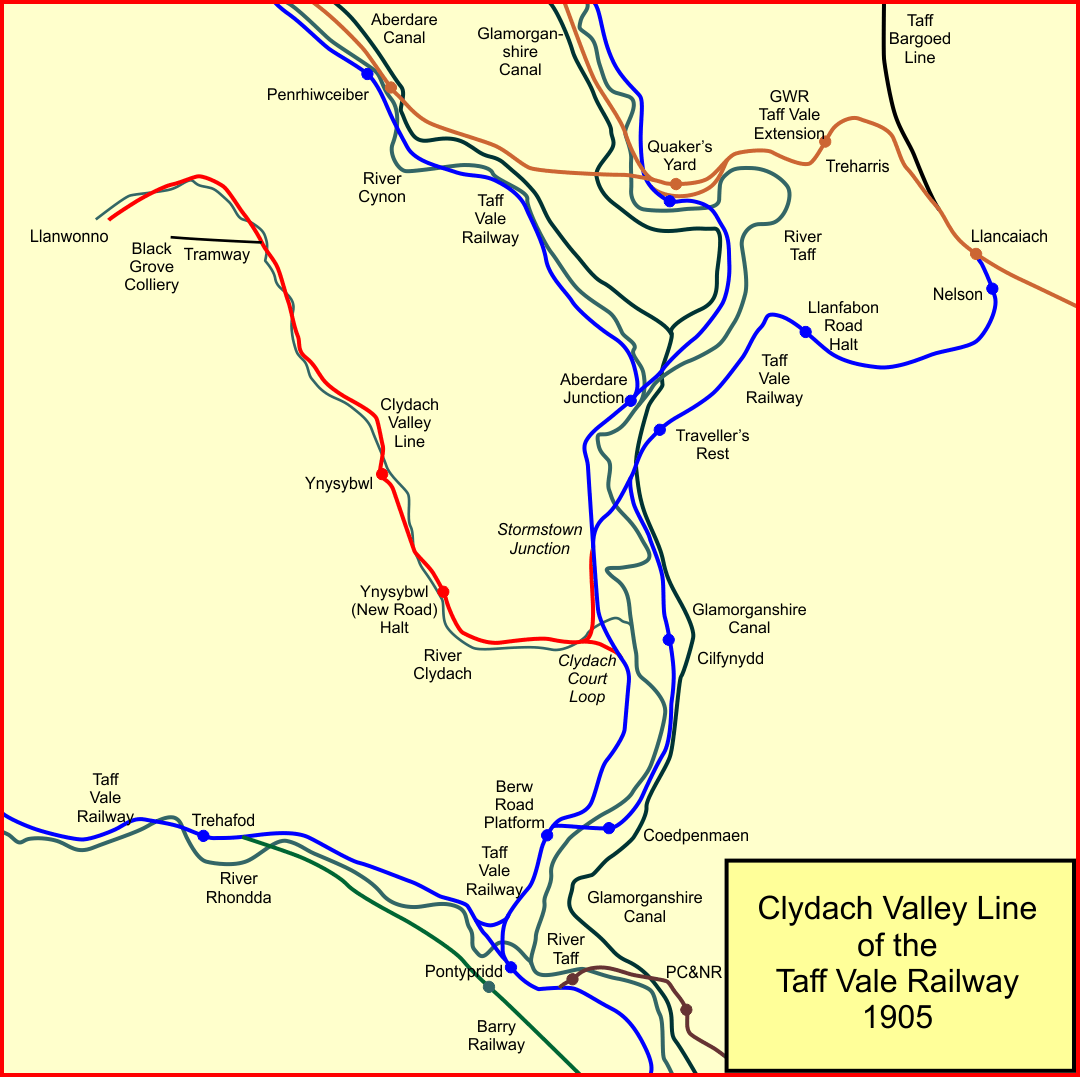
The Ynysybwl branch in 1905

From 1903 the TVR introduced steam railmotors on its system; it referred to these as "motor cars". They were single coach trains with a small integral steam engine, for providing a low-cost passenger service in lightly used areas. This was considered to enable the passenger service to Ynysybwl from Pontypridd to be introduced. The low-cost system permitted the use of additional stopping places on the branch, at Robertstown and Old Ynysybwl; the latter was beyond Ynysybwl. This required an additional inspection by the Board of Trade inspecting officer for the extended passenger section. The motor car service between Pontypridd and Old Ynysybwl using the Clydach Court Loop started operation on 17 October 1904. The new stopping places had platforms 40 feet in length, and only the motor cars were permitted to stop at them. There were no staff at these stops, and a fence and gate were provided, so that intending passengers were kept away from the platform edge until the gate was released by the guard of the train. There was no shelter or seating at these places. Notwithstanding the intended low-cost service, the motor cars had a crew of three. The service between Ynysybwl and Abercynon was ended.

== Growth of passenger traffic ==
The motor car service, and the switch to Pontypridd, proved a considerable success, and business grew steadily. Robertstown Platform in particular, was popular, and in fact a shelter was provided in 1908. In 1917 the volume of business was such that a booking office was provided there. An additional stopping place, Ynysybwl (New Road) Platform was opened near Windsor Passing Siding from 6 July 1910, and it was provided with a shelter in 1912; a waiting shelter was provided at Old Ynysybwl in the same year, and a new stopping place, Clydach Court Platform, opened in October 1915.

== Grouping of the railways ==
Following the Railways Act 1921, most of the railways of Great Britain were re-organised into one or other of four large concerns; the process was called the "grouping". The Taff Vale Railway was a constituent of the restructured Great Western Railway. The effective date of the change was 1 January 1922. (Note: The Grouping is popularly supposed to have taken place on 1 January 1923, but in fact the process was phased over more than a year.)

The Great Western Railway changed the nomenclature of the "Platform" stopping places to "Halt" in 1922.

== Decline of business ==
The Mynachdy Colliery, located a little beyond Ynysybwl, was working on a small scale at the beginning, and it seems to have stopped working by 1891. It was reopened by new owners in 1901, lasting until 1933 when its connection to the railway line was reduced in extent, finally closing in 1942. Beyond Mynachdy was Black Grove Colliery, using its railway connection from 1884 to 1895. It had a tramway on an inclined plane to reach the actual pithead on the hill.

Beyond Black Grove the line ran to a location near Llanwonno, at Cwm Clydach Siding, which was a general merchandise siding. Beyond that the Llanwonno Colliery operated from 1901 to 1904 only, and at the end of the line there was a mileage (general goods) siding; it was out of use by 1931.

After World War I passenger business declined steeply; by 1930 income had fallen to 26% of the value in 1923. Coal traffic too fell steeply in this period.

Against the trend, from September 1931 a morning school train from Old Ynysybwl to Abercynon was started, returning in the afternoon, for the use of schoolchildren and temporarily restoring a passenger service on the north curve at Stormstown. In 1952 three of the return trips on the branch were routed to Pontypridd via Abercynon.

The line above Mynachdy was closed in 1931, and the section above Old Ynysybwl was closed on 22 September 1949.

The decline in the passenger business did not immediately lead to withdrawal, but in 1952 the service did come to an end, the last train running on 26 July 1952. The line beyond Ynysybwl was closed completely, and the Clydach Court Loop was also closed.

Occasional excursion trains ran from Ynysybwl in later years, but Ynysybwl itself closed completely on 2 November 1959, the branch now being cut back to Lady Windsor Passing Siding. That was further cut back to Lady Windsor Colliery itself on 12 June 1960. Dowlas-Cardiff Colliery was connected by underground link to Lady Windsor in 1974, and this actually resulted in more mineral traffic on the branch. However merry-go-round arrangements for coal working were later introduced; the intention was that block trains would run speedily on a circuit from colliery to power station (or other destination) and the reversal at Stormstown Junction to continue southward was a regrettable complication.

Lady Windsor Colliery closed on 26 March 1988, and after removal of stockpiled coal, the last mineral train ran on 20 May 1988; on 15 October 1988 an enthusiasts' special train ran to Lady Windsor, the last revenue-earning train on the line.

== Topography ==
=== Ynysybwl branch ===
- Llanwonno;
- Old Ynysybwl Platform; opened 17 October 1904; closed 25 April 1921; reopened 22 August 1921; renamed Old Ynysybwl Halt 1922; closed 28 July 1952;
- Ynysbybwl; opened 1 January 1890; closed 28 July 1952;
- Robertstown Platform; opened 17 October 1904; renamed Robertstown Halt 1922; closed 28 July 1952;
- Ynysybwl New Road Platform; opened 6 July 1910; later renamed Ynysybwl New Road Halt; closed 28 July 1952;
- Clydach Court Loop Junction; divergence of Clydach Court Loop;
- Stormstown Junction; convergence with Pontypridd to Merthyr line.

=== Clydach Loop ===
- Clydach Court Loop Junction; above;
- Clydach Court Platform; opened October 1915; renamed Clydach Court Halt 1922; closed 28 July 1952;
- Clydach Court Junction; convergence with Merthyr to Pontypridd Line.
