= Corringham railway station =

Disused railway station in England

Corringham
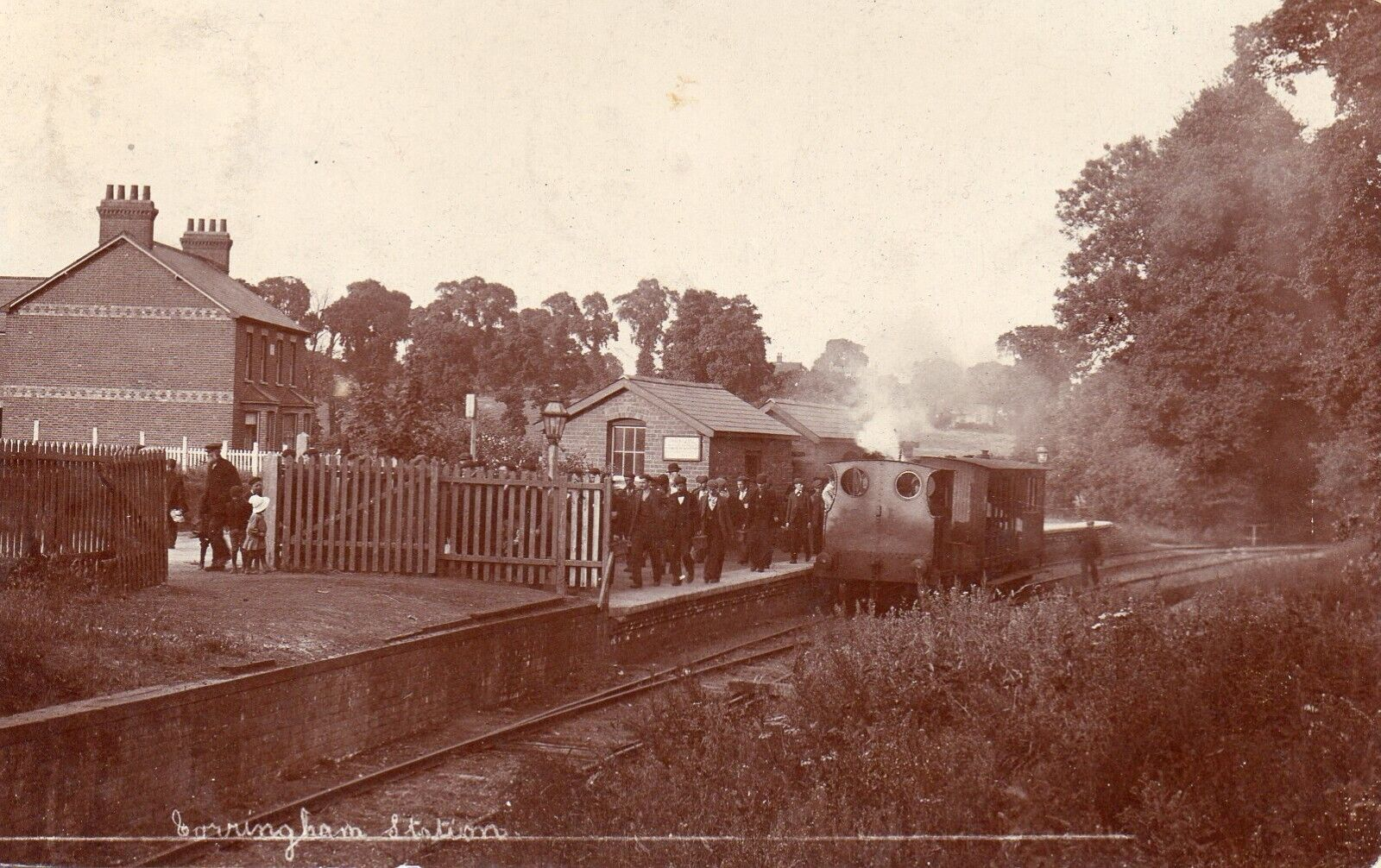

General information
- Location: Corringham, Essex; England
- Coordinates: 51.5272°N 0.4689°E
- Platforms: 1

Other information
- Status: Disused

History
- Original company: Corringham Light Railway

Key dates
- 22 June 1901: station opens
- 1 March 1952: station closes
Location

Corringham railway station served the villages of Corringham and Fobbing in Essex, England, between 1901 and 1952.

== History ==
The station was the terminus of the Corringham Light Railway. As opened, it had a cycle shed, male and female lavatories and an open-fronted shelter. There was also a small loading bank beyond the passenger platform. The buildings and platform were in red brick. Initially, the platform's length was 150 feet (46 m). During the First World War, the platform was lengthened to 340 feet (100 m), owing to the increased number of workers travelling to the explosive factories at Kynochtown. The platform remained this length until closure. In later years, the station became very dilapidated and run-down, and suffered a sharp fall in passenger numbers after the introduction of buses to the area in the 1920s. The loading bank was cut back and was out of use by the mid-1930s. The station closed in 1952 when the Vacuum Oil Company bought up the Coryton refinery and discontinued the passenger services.

== After closure ==
The station was demolished almost immediately after closure and the whole branch was lifted at about the same time. Despite this, the remainder of the railway remains in use as a goods line. The section between Thames Haven and Coryton was relaid at about the same time the Corringham branch was removed.

Preceding station	Disused railways	Following station
Coryton (Essex); Line open, station closed	Corringham Light Railway	Terminus
