= Carlinghow =

Administrative area in West Yorkshire, England

Coordinates: 53.723°N 1.648°W

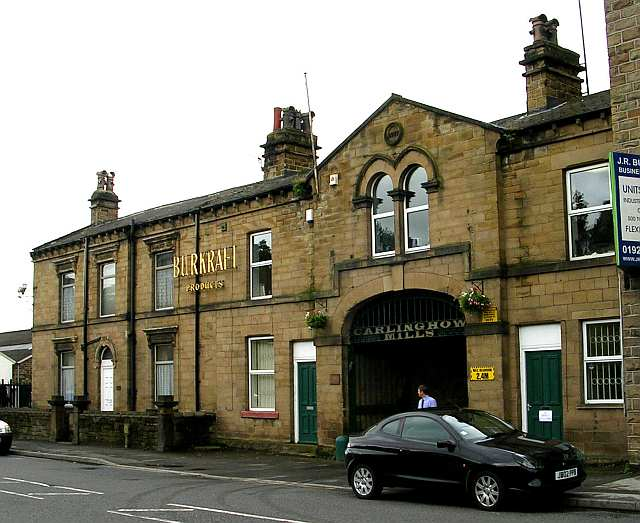
- Carlinghow Mills, Bradford Road, Carlinghow

- Location within West Yorkshire
- Metropolitan borough: Kirklees
- Metropolitan county: West Yorkshire
- Region: Yorkshire and the Humber
- Country: England
- Sovereign state: United Kingdom
- Police: West Yorkshire
- Fire: West Yorkshire
- Ambulance: Yorkshire
- UK Parliament: Spen Valley

Carlinghow is a district of Batley, West Yorkshire, England.

It is west of Batley town centre, and stretches up towards White Lee and Birstall, along Carlinghow Lane and Bradford Road.

The name means "the hill or burial mound of the "Witch", or "Hag"", as in an old woman, probably a soothsayer. A 'Carle' in Scots is a commoner, a husband or in a derogatory sense, a churl or male of low birth. The name 'Carline', 'Cairlin', Carlin, 'Cyarlin', 'Kerlin' or 'Kerl' was also used in Lowland Scots as a derogatory term for an old woman, meaning an 'old hag'. It is a corruption or equivalent of the Gaelic word "Cailleach", meaning a witch or the 'old Hag', the Goddess of Winter. (A "how" means a mound, the same as a "low", often the last resting place of some ancient person of noble ranking.

It has been suggested in some quarters that the rocky outcrop, which is supposedly the place from where Carlinghow derives its name, known locally as "The Outies", was in ancient times a Druidic settlement, encompassing a sacred oak grove. Oak trees are still plentiful along the banks of the hillside, as are holly bushes, which were also sacred to the Drudic Bards of Iron Age Celtic Britain. It was in this area where the Druids once ruled which is why many of the field names have a reference to the sun and oaks. It is this area which catches the first rays of the sun on a morning. Nearby waterway the Batley Beck, a tributary of the River Calder runs through Carlinghow, winding parallel along the course Bradford Road.

Carlinghow used to have a station on a branch line that ran northwards from Batley to Birstall. The railway itself opened in 1852, with Carlinghow station being opened in 1872. Competition from Leeds New Line trains at Birstall and electric trams meant that the line closed to passengers as a wartime economy measure in December 1916, but the passenger trains were never restarted. The line remained open for freight until 1962.

Batley General Hospital was located on Carlinghow Hill. The hospital was funded by the wealthy inhabitants of the area and was founded in 1878, and opening to practice in 1881. It lasted for just over 100 years after finally being closed in 1988.

In the area around Summerbridge Close was once Carlinghow Old Hall, an Elizabethan Manor House, a timber-framed building reputed to have been the home of the Eland family in the later Middle Ages. According to Sheard's book, Records of Batley, it was built by Robert Eland, who died in 1521. The style of the timbering also suggests a 16th-century date, and there was, in 1968, a loose date-stone on site inscribed with the year 1505.

All that survived in the late 1960s, when the Hall was recorded in detail before its demolition, was a two-storey, two-bay timber-framed range with stone walling to the ground floor, and diagonal timber ‘stud’ walling with a stone slate infill (partly replaced by bricks) at first-floor level.

The ground floor stone walling was an original feature of the building (there were no peg holes or mortices to show that it replaced earlier timbering), though the windows in it were timber-mullioned. The first-floor windows projected from the walls.

A drawing of the Hall, published in Sheard's book in 1894, shows that the building was no more extensive at that date than it was in the 1960s, but what survived then was presumably only the 'solar' wing of a once much bigger 'gentry house'.

Carlinghow Lane is a gradual hill.

Batley Community Fire Station was at Carlinghow, but this and Dewsbury Fire Station were closed in August 2015 when a combined fire station was opened up on Carlton Road in Dewsbury. The Wilton council estate and Wilton Park, locally known as Batley Park, are both in the area.

== See also ==
- Listed buildings in Batley
