= Carterhatch Lane railway station =

Former railway station in England

Carterhatch Lane
- Interactive map of Carterhatch Lane

General information
- Location: Enfield
- Local authority: London Borough of Enfield
- Number of platforms: 1

Railway companies
- Pre-grouping: Great Eastern Railway

Key dates
- 1916: Opened
- 1919: Closed

Other information
- Coordinates: 51.6604°N 0.0493°W

Carterhatch Lane Halt was a railway station built by the Great Eastern Railway in 1916 on the Southbury Loop line to the north east of London in the United Kingdom. The Southbury Loop line was reopened in 1915 for passenger services for munitions workers to access factories in the Lea Valley area however the line closed in 1919.

== Design ==
The station was a very basic affair – a wooden platform long enough for two coaches and a couple of oil lamps for illumination. At the time the up line (towards Liverpool Street) was used for goods wagon storage so the platform was built on the down line. The platform was accessed via a wooden staircase from Carterhatch Lane which crossed the line at a loop at this point.

The oil lamps were lit by the train guard and all had shades so the light would shine downwards as a war time precaution. When Zeppelin raiders were close the train would be positioned under the bridge and passengers would join the crew there until the danger passed.

== Services ==
Services were operated by a Great Eastern Railway Auto-train operating 15 trains per day between Lower Edmonton Low-Level station and Cheshunt (although later some terminated at White Hart Lane). Motive power for the train was normally a Great Eastern Railway Y65 class (LNER classification F7) 2-4-2T tank engine.

=== Withdrawal of service ===
Once World War I was over, the need for the service all but disappeared and the service was withdrawn in 1919. The station name boards and lamps were removed soon after but the structure lasted at least until the outbreak of World War II.

Preceding station	Historical railways	Following station
Turkey Street; Line and station open	Great Eastern Railway; Southbury Loop	Southbury; Line and station open

=== Electrification ===
In the late 1950s the site was used for an electrification depot as the local Lea Valley Lines were electrified. A temporary signal box was opened to facilitate operation of the depot. This opened in early 1958 but was rarely used after electrification was completed in 1960 so the box was downgraded on 7 July 1960 to a ground frame (the line was being resignalled at the time) and then closed in February 1965.

The Southbury Loop was electrified in 1959–1960 and passenger services serving the other stations on the loop commenced on 21 November 1960. Carterhatch Lane station did not reopen.
