= Coryton railway station (Essex) =

Former railway station in England

Coryton

General information
- Location: Coryton Refinery, Essex; England
- Coordinates: 51.5166°N 0.5075°E
- Grid reference: TQ740827
- Platforms: 1

Other information
- Status: Disused

History
- Original company: Corringham Light Railway

Key dates
- 22 June 1901: opens as Kynochtown
- c. 1920: station rebuilt
- 1923: renamed Coryton
- 1 March 1952: closed
- 1986: repaired
Location

Coryton railway station served the village of Kynochtown (later Coryton) and the Coryton Refinery in Essex, England, between 1901 and 1952.

== History ==
The station opened on 22 June 1901. Its original name was Kynochtown after the workers' village nearby. The original station had a wooden platform 100 ft long, with a building housing male and female toilets and a waiting shelter, also made of wood. It was lit by large oil lamps. During the First World War, the station's platform was extended at both ends in wood. In around 1917, a further extension in brick was added. After the war ended, the Kynoch site was sold to Cory Brothers of Cardiff and the station was subsequently renamed Coryton, along with the village. By this time, it was realised that the station (indeed the whole railway) would never be so busy again, so the wooden platform was demolished, leaving just the brick extension, with a ramp made from old sleepers added at its left end. The station building was resited at ground level a short distance away. The brick platform itself had one metal seat, but no other facilities. There were a number of sidings at the station, which became overgrown in later years.

== Closure ==
The station closed when passenger services on the line ended in 1952. In the years immediately afterwards, the wooden building was demolished and the station became heavily infested with weeds. In 1986, the station was repaired by Mobil.

Preceding station	Disused railways	Following station
Terminus	Corringham Light Railway	Corringham; Line and station closed
