= Caerau railway station =

Disused railway station in Caerau, Bridgend County Borough

Caerau
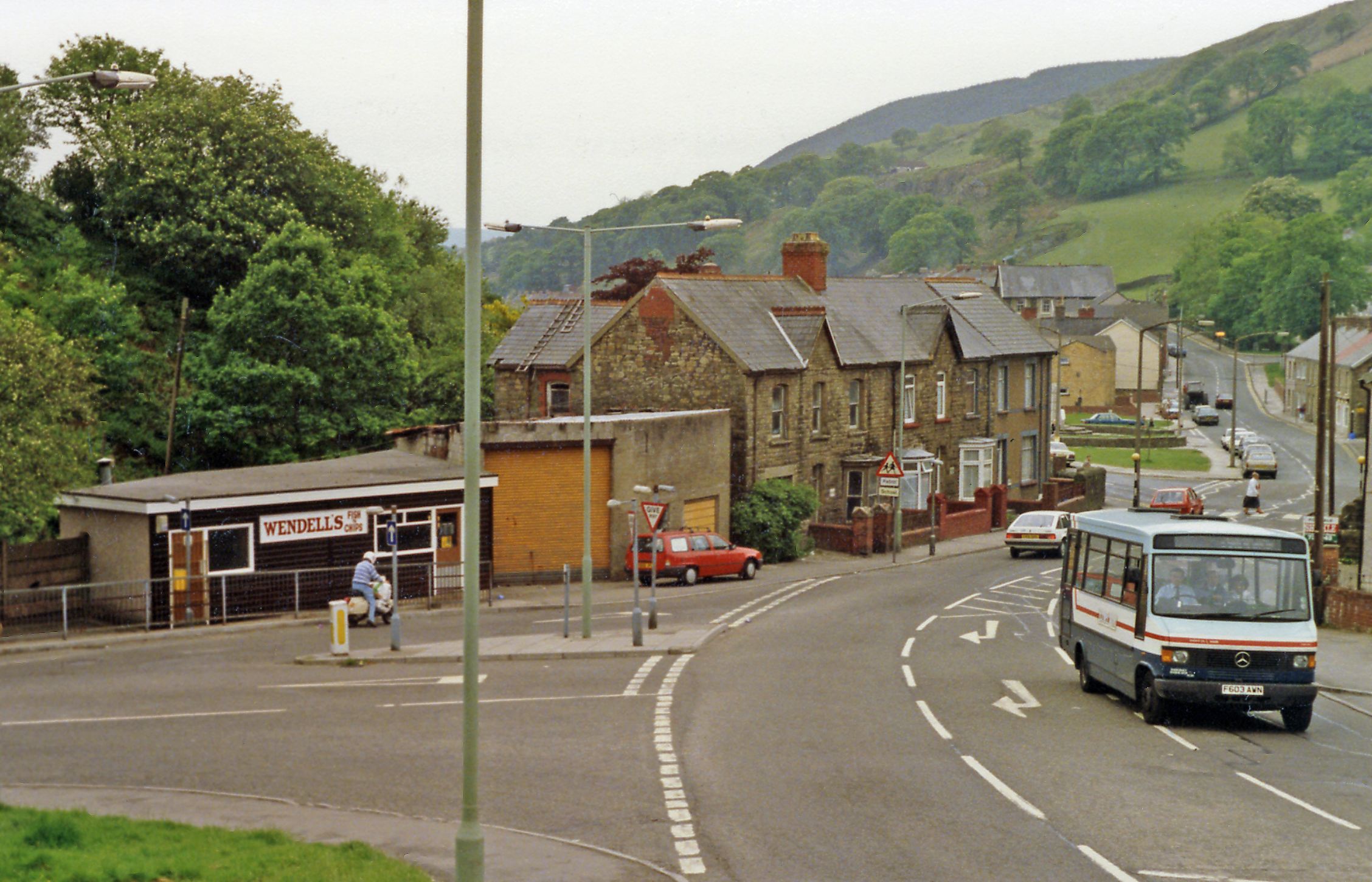
- Site of Caerau station in 1990

General information
- Location: Caerau, Glamorgan; Wales
- Coordinates: 51.6367°N 3.6574°W
- Grid reference: SS854944
- Platforms: 1

Other information
- Status: Disused

History
- Original company: Great Western Railway
- Post-grouping: Great Western Railway

Key dates
- 1 April 1901: Opened
- 22 June 1970: Closed
Location

Caerau railway station served the village of Caerau, in the historical county of Glamorgan, Wales, from 1901 to 1970 on the Llynvi and Ogmore Railway.

== History ==
The station was opened on 1 April 1901 by the Great Western Railway. It was a request stop. The route was cut back from Cymmer in June 1960 and the station closed to the public on 22 June 1970. It was used by schools until 15 July 1970.

Preceding station	Disused railways	Following station
Nantyffllon; Line and station closed	Great Western Railway; Llynvi and Ogmore Railway	Cymmer Afan; Line and station closed
