= List of closed railway stations in Great Britain: M–O =

The list of closed railway stations in Great Britain includes the following: Year of closure is given if known. Some stations reopened as heritage railways continue to be included in this list and some have been linked. Some stations have been reopened to passenger traffic. Some lines remain in use for freight and mineral traffic.

== M ==
=== Ma ===
Station (Town, unless in station name)	Rail company	Year closed
Mablethorpe	GNR	1970
Macbie Hill	North British Railway	1933
Macclesfield Hibel Road	Manchester and Birmingham Railway	1960
Macclesfield (MB&M)	Macclesfield, Bollington and Marple Railway	1873
Macduff	Great North of Scotland Railway	1951
Macduff (Banff)	Great North of Scotland Railway	1872
Machen	Brecon and Merthyr Railway	1962
Machrihanish	Campbeltown and Machrihanish Light Railway	1932
Machrihanish Farm Halt	Campbeltown and Machrihanish Light Railway	1932
Machynlleth	Corris Railway	1931
Machynlleth Town	Corris Railway	1878
Macmerry	North British Railway	1925
Maddaford Moor Halt	SR	1966
Madderty	Caledonian Railway	1951
Madeley (Shropshire)	GWR	1925
Madeley (Staffordshire)	L&NWR	1952
Madeley Market	L&NWR	1952
Madeley Road	North Staffordshire Railway	1931
Maenclochog	Narberth Road and Maenclochog Railway	1937
Maentwrog Road	GWR	1960
Maerdy	Taff Vale Railway	1964
Maesbrook	Potteries, Shrewsbury and North Wales Railway	1933
Maesmawr	Taff Vale Railway	1841
Maesteg Castle Street	GWR	1970
Maesteg (Neath Road)	Port Talbot Railway	1933
Maesycrugiau	GWR	1965
Maesycwmmer	Brecon and Merthyr Tydfil Junction Railway	1962
Magdalen Gate	GER	1866
Magdalen Green	Caledonian Railway	1956
Magor	GWR	1964
Maiden Lane	GNR	1852
Maiden Lane	North London Railway	1917
Maidenhead Boyne Hill	Wycombe Railway	1871
Maidens	Glasgow and South Western Railway	1930
Main Street (Glasgow)	Glasgow and South Western Railway	1900
Maindy Halt	Taff Vale Railway	1958
Mains of Penninghame	Portpatrick and Wigtownshire Joint Railway	1885
Maldon East and Heybridge	GER	1964
Maldon West	GER	1939
Malins Lee	L&NWR	1952
Mallwyd	Mawddwy Railway	1931
Malmesbury	GWR	1951
Malpas	L&NWR	1957
Malswick Halt	GWR	1959
Maltby	South Yorkshire Joint Railway	1929
Malvern Hanley Road	Midland Railway	1952
Malvern Wells	Great Western Railway	1965
Manchester Central	Cheshire Lines Committee	1969
Manchester Exchange	L&NWR	1969
Manchester, Liverpool Road	Liverpool and Manchester Railway	1844 now preserved
Manchester Mayfield	L&NWR	1960
Manchester Oldham Road	Manchester and Leeds Railway	1844
Manchester Road (Bradford)	GNR	1915
Manchester United Football Ground	Cheshire Lines Committee	2017
Mangotsfield	Midland Railway	1869; 1966
Manley	Cheshire Lines Committee	1875
Manningford Halt	GWR	1966
Manningham	Midland Railway	1965
Manod	GWR	1960
Manor House Street (Hull)	Hull and Selby Railway	1854
Manor Way	Eastern Counties Railway	1940
Manors North	NER	1978
Mansfield Central	Great Central Railway	1956
Mansfield Town	Midland Railway	1964 reopened 1995
Mansfield Woodhouse	Midland Railway	1964 reopened 1995
Manston	Leeds and Selby Railway	1869
Manton	Midland Railway	1966
Manuel	North British Railway	1967
Manuel Low Level	North British Railway	1933
Marazion	GWR	1964
Marchington	North Staffordshire Railway	1958
Marchmont	North British Railway	1948
Marchwiel	Cambrian Railways	1962
Marchwood	SR	1966
Mardock	GER	1964
Marfleet	NER	1964
Margam Halt	Great Western Railway	1964
Margate East	London, Chatham and Dover Railway	1953
Margate Sands	South Eastern Railway (UK)	1926
Marishes Road	York and North Midland Railway	1965
Market Bosworth	Ashby and Nuneaton Joint Railway	1931 reopened 2011
Market Drayton	GWR	1963
Market Place (Chesterfield)	Great Central Railway	1951
Market Place (Dewsbury)	Lancashire and Yorkshire Railway	1930
Market Weighton	NER	1965
Markham Village Halt	L&NWR	1960
Marlborough High Level	GWR	1933
Marlborough Low Level	Midland and South Western Junction Railway	1961
Marlborough Road	Metropolitan Railway	1939
Marlesford	GER	1952
Marlpool	GNR	1928
Marron Junction	L&NWR	1897
Marsden (Tyne and Wear)	South Shields, Marsden and Whitburn Colliery Railway	1953
Marsden Cottage Halt	South Shields, Marsden and Whitburn Colliery Railway	1953
Marshbrook	Shrewsbury and Hereford Joint Railway	1958
Marshes Turnpike Gate	Monmouthshire Railway and Canal Company	1853
Marshfield	GWR	1959
Marsh Gibbon and Poundon	L&NWR	1968
Marsh Lane	Leeds and Selby Railway	1869; 1958
Marsh Mills	GWR	1962
Marsh Road Level Crossing	Grimsby and Immingham Tramway	1961
Marston Gate	L&NWR	1953
Marston Halt	GWR	1955
Marston Lane	GWR	1864
Marston Magna	GWR	1966
Marston Moor	NER	1958
Marteg Halt	GWR	1962
Martell Bridge Halt	GWR	1937
Martham	Midland and Great Northern Joint Railway	1959
Martock	GWR	1964
Marton (Warwickshire)	L&NWR	1960
Mary Tavy and Blackdown	GWR	1962
Maryhill Central	Caledonian Railway	1964
Maryhill Park	North British Railway	1961 reopened 1993
Marykirk	Caledonian Railway	1956
Maryville	North British Railway	1908
Masbury Halt	Somerset and Dorset Joint Railway	1966
Masham	NER	1931
Massingham	Midland and Great Northern Joint Railway	1959
Mathry Road	GWR	1964
Matthewstown Halt	Taff Vale Railway	1964
Mauchline	Glasgow, Paisley, Kilmarnock and Ayr Railway	1965
Maud Junction	Great North of Scotland Railway	1965
Maudland Bridge (Preston)	Fleetwood, Preston and West Riding Junction Railway	1885
Maudlands (Preston)	Preston and Wyre Joint Railway	1844
Maud's Bridge	South Yorkshire Railway	1866
Mawcarse	North British Railway	1964
Maxstoke	Midland Railway	1917
Maxton	North British Railway	1964
Maxwell House (Preston)	Bolton and Preston Railway	1844
Maxwelltown	Glasgow and South Western Railway	1939
Maybole Junction	Ayr and Dalmellington Railway	1859
Mayfield (Sussex)	London, Brighton and South Coast Railway	1965
Mayhill (Monmouth)	GWR	1959

=== Me ===
Station (Town, unless in station name)	Rail company	Year closed
Meadowbank Stadium	British Rail	1998
Meadowhall and Wincobank	South Yorkshire Railway	1953
Mealsgate	Maryport and Carlisle Railway	1930
Measham	Ashby and Nuneaton Joint Railway	1931
Measurements Halt	London, Midland and Scottish Railway	1955
Medbourne	GNR/LNWR	1916
Medge Hall	South Yorkshire Railway	1960
Medina Wharf Halt	Isle of Wight Central Railway	1966
Medstead and Four Marks	LSWR	1973 reopened 1983
Meeth Halt	SR	1965
Meigle	Caledonian Railway	1951
Meigle Junction	Scottish North Eastern Railway	1861
Meikle Earnock Halt	Caledonian Railway	1943
Meikle Ferry	Highland Railway	1869
Meir	North Staffordshire Railway	1966
Melbourne (Derbyshire)	Midland Railway	1930
Melcombe Regis	Weymouth and Portland Railway	1952 regular services,1959 completely
Meldon	North British Railway	1952
Meldon Quarry Halt	London & South Western Railway	1968 new station opened by Dartmoor Rly
Meliden	LNWR	1930
Melksham	GWR	1966 reopened 1985
Melling	Furness and Midland Joint Railway	1952
Mellis	GER	1966
Mells Road	GWR	1959
Melmerby	NER	1967
Melrose	North British Railway	1969
Meltham	Lancashire and Yorkshire Railway	1949
Meltham Mills Halt	Lancashire and Yorkshire Railway	1934
Melton Constable	Midland and Great Northern Joint Railway	1964
Melton Halt	North Eastern Railway	1989
Melton Mowbray North	GNR/LNWR Joint	1953 regular services, 1962 summer weekend services
Melverley	Potteries, Shrewsbury and North Wales Railway	1933
Melyncourt Halt	GWR	1964
Memorial	Sand Hutton Light Railway	1930
Menai Bridge	LNWR	1966
Mendlesham	Mid-Suffolk Light Railway	1952
Menston	Leeds and Selby Railway	1869
Menstrie and Glenochil	North British Railway	1954
Menthorpe Gate	NER	1953
Meole Brace	Shropshire and Montgomeryshire Railway	1933
Merchiston	Caledonian Railway	1965
Merkland Street	Glasgow Subway	1977
Merry Lees	Midland Railway	1871
Merstone	Isle of Wight Central Railway	1956
Merthyr Road	Vale of Neath Railway	1853
Merthyr (Plymouth Street)	Taff Vale Railway	1877
Merton Abbey	Tooting, Merton and Wimbledon Railway	1929
Merton Park	LB&SCR and L&SWR Joint	1997
Merton Street (Banbury)	LNWR	1961
Methil	North British Railway	1955
Methley Junction	Lancashire and Yorkshire Railway	1943
Methley North	Midland Railway	1957
Methley South	Methley Joint Railway	1960
Methven	Caledonian Railway	1937
Methven Junction	Caledonian Railway	1951
Mexborough (Ferry Boat) Halt	South Yorkshire Railway	1871
Mexborough Junction	South Yorkshire Railway	1871
Meyrick Park Halt	LSWR	1917

=== Mi ===
Station (Town, unless in station name)	Rail company	Year closed
Micklam	Cleator and Workington Junction Railway	1926
Mickle Trafford	Birkenhead Railway	1951
Mickle Trafford East	Cheshire Lines Committee	1951
Micklehurst	LNWR	1907
Mickleover	GNR	1939
Mickleton	NER	1964
Mickleton Halt	GWR	1941
Mickley	NER	1915
Mid Clyth	Wick and Lybster Railway	1944
Mid Fearn Halt	Highland Railway	1928
Middle Drove	GER	1968
Middle Stoke Halt	South Eastern and Chatham Railway	1961
Middleton (Lancashire)	Lancashire and Yorkshire Railway	1964
Middleton Junction	Lancashire and Yorkshire Railway	1966
Middleton North (Northumberland)	North British Railway	1952
Middleton Road Bridge Halt	Midland Railway	1905
Middleton Towers (Norfolk)	Great Eastern Railway	1968
Middleton-in-Teesdale	NER	1964
Middleton-on-Lune	L&NWR	1931
Middleton-on-the-Wolds	NER	1954
Middlewich	L&NWR	1960
Middlewood Higher	Great Central and North Staffordshire Joint Railway	1960
Midford	Somerset and Dorset Joint Railway	1966
Midford Halt	GWR	1915
Midge Hall	Lancashire and Yorkshire Railway	1961
Midhurst	London and South Western Railway	1925
Midhurst	London, Brighton and South Coast Railway	1955
Midsomer Norton and Welton	GWR	1959
Midsomer Norton South	Somerset and Dorset Joint Railway	1966
Midville	GNR	1970
Milborne Port	London and South Western Railway	1966
Milcote	GWR	1966
Mildenhall	GER	1962
Mildmay Park	North London Railway	1934
Mile End (London)	Eastern Counties Railway	1872
Miles Platting	Lancashire and Yorkshire Railway	1995
Milford and Brocton	L&NWR	1950
Milford (Salisbury)	London and South Western Railway	1859
Milford Junction (Yorkshire)	York and North Midland Railway	1904
Milkwall	Severn and Wye Railway	1929
Mill Hill (Isle of Wight)	Isle of Wight Central Railway	1966
Mill Hill (The Hale)	GNR	1939
Mill Pond Halt	West Sussex Railway	1935
Mill Road Halt	GER	1952
Mill Street Platform	Taff Vale Railway	1912
Millegin	Great North of Scotland Railway	1863
Millerhill	North British Railway	1955
Millers Bridge	Lancashire and Yorkshire Railway	1876
Millers Dale	Midland Railway	1967
Millfield	NER	1955
Millgrove (Cumbria)	Cleator and Workington Junction Railway	by 1921
Millhouses and Ecclesall	Midland Railway	1968
Milliken Park	Glasgow and South Western Railway	1966 reopened 1989
Millisle	Portpatrick and Wigtownshire Joint Railway	1903; 1950
Mills of Drum	Deeside Railway	1966
Milltimber	Great North of Scotland Railway	1937
Milltown	Ashover Light Railway	1936
Millwall Docks	GER	1926
Millwall Junction	GER	1926
Millway	LM&SR	1959
Milnathort	North British Railway	1964
Milnrow	Lancashire and Yorkshire Railway	2009
Milnthorpe	L&NWR	1968
Milton (Staffordshire)	North Staffordshire Railway	1956
Milton Halt	GWR	1951
Milton of Campsie	North British Railway	1951
Milton Range Halt	South Eastern and Chatham Railway	1932
Milton Road (Somerset)	Weston, Clevedon and Portishead Railway	1940
Milton Road Halt	South Eastern and Chatham Railway	1915
Milverton (Somerset)	GWR	1966
Mindrum	NER	1930
Minety and Ashton Keynes	GWR	1964
Minories	London and Blackwall Railway	1853
Minshull Vernon	L&NWR	1942
Minsterley	Shrewsbury and Welshpool Railway	1951
Minster on Sea	Sheppey Light Railway	1950
Mintlaw	Great North of Scotland Railway	1965
Misterton	Great Northern and Great Eastern Joint Railway	1961
Mitcham	LB&SCR	1997
Mitcheldean Road	GWR	1964
Mitchell and Newlyn Halt	GWR	1963
Mithian Halt	GWR	1963

=== Mo ===
Station (Town, unless in station name)	Rail company	Year closed
Moat Lane	Llanidloes and Newtown Railway	1863
Moat Lane Junction	Cambrian Railways	1962
Mochdre & Pabo	L&NWR	1931
Moelwyn Halt	Ffestiniog Railway	1939
Moffat	Caledonian Railway	1954
Moira	Midland Railway	1964
Mold	L&NWR	1962
Mollington	Birkenhead Railway	1960
Molyneux Brow	Lancashire and Yorkshire Railway	1931
Moniaive	Glasgow and South Western Railway	1943
Monikie	Caledonian Railway	1955
Monk Bretton	Midland Railway	1937
Monk Fryston	NER	1959
Monks Ferry (Birkenhead)	Birkenhead Railway	1878
Monks Lane Halt	London, Brighton and South Coast Railway	1939
Monks Moors Halt	Whitehaven and Furness Junction Railway	1958
Monkton	Glasgow, Paisley, Kilmarnock and Ayr Railway	1940
Monkton and Came Halt	GWR	1957
Monkton Combe Halt	GWR	1925
Monkwearmouth	NER	1967
Monmore Green	L&NWR	1917
Monmouth Mayhill	GWR	1959
Monmouth Troy	GWR	1959
Monsal Dale	Midland Railway	1959
Montacute	GWR	1964
Montgomerie Pier (Ardrossan)	L&AR	1968
Montgomery	Cambrian Railways	1965
Montgreenan	Glasgow, Paisley, Kilmarnock and Ayr Railway	1955
Monton Green	L&NWR	1969
Montrose (Caledonian Railway)	Caledonian Railway	1934
Monument Lane	L&NWR	1886; 1958
Monymusk	Great North of Scotland Railway	1950
Moor Edge	NER	1882
Moor Row	Whitehaven, Cleator and Egremont Junction Railway	1947 public services 1965 workmen services
Moore	L&NWR	1943
Moorfields (Hereford)	Midland Railway	1874
Moorgate Halt (Oldham)	L&NWR	1955
Moorhampton	Midland Railway	1962
Moorhouse and South Elmsall Halt	Hull and Barnsley Railway	1929
Moorpark (Stevenston)	Caledonian Railway	1932
Moorswater	Liskeard and Looe Railway	1901
Moortown	Great Central Railway	1965
Morcott	L&NWR	1966
Morden Road	LB&SCR	1997
Morebath	GWR	1966
Morebath Junction Halt	GWR	1966
Morecambe Euston Road	L&NWR	1962
Morecambe Harbour	Midland Railway	1904
Morecambe (Northumberland Street)	"Little" North Western Railway	1907
Morecambe Poulton Lane	London and North Western Railway	1886
Morecambe Promenade	Midland Railway	1994
Moredon Halt	Midland and South Western Junction Railway	1924
Moresby Junction Halt	Cleator and Workington Junction Railway	1923 public 1952 workmen
Moresby Parks	Cleator and Workington Junction Railway	1931
Moretonhampstead	GWR	1959
Moreton-on-Lugg	Shrewsbury and Hereford Railway	1958
Morley Top	GNR	1961
Mormond Halt	Great North of Scotland Railway	1965
Morningside	Caledonian Railway	1930
Morningside	North British Railway	1930
Morningside Road	North British Railway	1962
Morpeth	Blyth and Tyne Railway	1880
Morris Cowley	GWR	1963
Morriston East	Midland Railway	1950
Morriston West	GWR	1956
Mortehoe & Woolacombe	London and South Western Railway	1970
Morton Pinkney	East and West Junction Railway	1952
Morton Road	GNR	1930
Moseley	Midland Railway	1941, reopened 2026
Moss	NER	1953
Moss and Pentre	Great Central Railway	1917
Moss Bank	L&NWR	1951
Moss Halt	GWR	1931
Moss Road Halt	Campbeltown and Machrihanish Light Railway	1932
Moss Side	Preston and Wyre Joint Railway	1961 reopened 1983
Mossbridge	Cheshire Lines Committee	1917
Mossend	Caledonian Railway	1962
Mossley Halt	North Staffordshire Railway	1925
Mosspark West	Glasgow and South Western Railway	1983 reopened 1990
Mosstowie	Highland Railway	1955
Mostyn	L&NWR	1966
Motherwell Bridge	Lesmahagow Railway	1885
Motherwell Junction	Wishaw and Coltness Railway	1885
Mottisfont	London and South Western Railway	1964
Moulsford	GWR	1892
Moulton (Lincolnshire)	Midland and Great Northern Joint Railway	1959
Moulton (North Yorkshire)	NER	1969
Mount Gould and Tothill	GWR	1918
Mount Hawke Halt	GWR	1963
Mount Melville	North British Railway	1930
Mount Pleasant Halt	North Staffordshire Railway	1918
Mount Pleasant Road Halt (Exeter)	London and South Western Railway	1928
Mount Street (Brecon)	Mid Wales Railway	1871
Mount Vernon	Caledonian Railway	1943 reopened 1993
Mount Vernon North	North British Railway	1955
Mountain Ash Cardiff Road	Taff Vale Railway	1964
Mountain Ash Oxford Street	Taff Vale Railway	1964
Mountfield Halt	Southern Railway	1969
Mow Cop & Scholar Green	North Staffordshire Railway	1964
Moy	Highland Railway	1965

=== Mu ===
Station (Town, unless in station name)	Rail company	Year closed
Much Wenlock	GWR	1962
Muchalls	Caledonian Railway	1950
Muirkirk	Glasgow and South Western Railway	1964
Muirton	LM&SR	1959
Muir of Ord	Highland Railway	1960 reopened 1976
Mulben	Highland Railway	1964
Mumbles Pier	Swansea and Mumbles Railway	1959
Mumbles Road	L&NWR	1964
Mumby Road	GNR	1970
Mundesley-on-Sea	Norfolk and Suffolk Joint Railway	1964
Munlochy	Highland Railway	1951
Murrayfield	Caledonian Railway	1962
Murrow East	Midland and Great Northern Joint Railway	1959
Murrow West	Great Northern and Great Eastern Joint Railway	1953
Murthly	Highland Railway	1965
Murtle Halt	Great North of Scotland Railway	1937
Murton	NER	1953
Murton Lane	Derwent Valley Light Railway	1926
Musgrave	NER	1952
Musselburgh (1847)	North British Railway	1964
Muswell Hill	GNR	1954
Muthill	Caledonian Railway	1964
Mutley (Plymouth)	GWR	1939

== N ==
=== Na ===
Station (Town, unless in station name)	Rail company	Year closed
Naburn	NER	1953
Nailbridge Halt	GWR	1930
Nailsworth	Midland Railway	1947
Nancegollan	GWR	1962
Nannerch	L&NWR	1962
Nanstallon Halt	London and South Western Railway	1967
Nantclwyd	L&NWR	1953
Nantgaredig	L&NWR	1963
Nantgarw (High Level) Halt	Alexandra (Newport and South Wales) Docks and Railway	1956
Nantgarw (Low Level) Halt	Cardiff Railway	1931
Nantlle	Nantlle Railway	1932
Nantybwch	L&NWR	1960
Nantyderry	GWR	1958
Nantyffyllon	GWR	1970
Nantyglo	GWR	1962
Nantymoel	GWR	1958
Napsbury	Midland Railway	1959
Napton and Stockton	L&NWR	1958
Narborough and Pentney	GER	1968
Nassington	L&NWR	1957
Nast Hyde Halt	GNR	1951
Nateby	Garstang and Knot-End Railway	1930
Navenby	GNR	1962
Naworth	NER	1952
Nawton	NER	1953

=== Ne ===
Station (Town, unless in station name)	Rail company	Year closed
Neath Abbey	Great Western Railway	1936
Neath Cadoxton	Neath and Brecon Railway	1889
Neath Canal Side	Rhondda and Swansea Bay Railway	1935
Neath Riverside	Neath and Brecon Railway	1962
Necropolis (London)	London and South Western Railway	1941
Needham	GER	1967 reopened 1971
Neen Sollars	GWR	1962
Neepsend	Manchester, Sheffield and Lincolnshire Railway	1940
Neilston Low	Glasgow, Barrhead and Neilston Direct Railway	1966
Nelson Glam	Taff Vale Railway	1932
Nelson and Llancaiach	GWR	1964
Nelson Dock	Liverpool Overhead Railway	1956
Nesscliffe and Pentre	Potteries, Shrewsbury and North Wales Railway	1933
Neston South	Birkenhead Joint Railway	1956
Netherburn	Caledonian	1951
Nethercleugh	Caledonian	1960
Netherhope Halt	GWR	1959
Netherton (Dudley)	GWR	1878
Netherton (Huddersfield)	Lancashire and Yorkshire Railway	1949
Nethy Bridge	Great North of Scotland Railway	1965

=== New ===
Station (Town, unless in station name)	Rail company	Year closed
New Basford	Great Central Railway	1964
New Biggin	Midland Railway	1970
New Bolingbroke	GNR	1970
New Broughton Road Halt	Great Central Railway	1917
New Cross	East London Railway	1886
New Cumnock	Glasgow and South Western Railway	1965 reopened 1991
New Cut Lane Halt	Lancashire and Yorkshire Railway	1938
New Dale Halt	GWR	1962
New Dykes Brow	North British Railway	1866
New Galloway	Portpatrick and Wigtownshire Railway	1965
New Hadley Halt	GWR	1985
New Hall Bridge Halt	Lancashire and Yorkshire Railway	1948
New Halls	North British Railway	1878
New Holland Pier	Great Central Railway	1981
New Holland Town	Great Central Railway	1981
New Inn Bridge Halt	GWR	1937
New Longton and Hutton	Lancashire and Yorkshire Railway	1964
New Luce	Glasgow and South Western Railway	1965
New Passage Halt	GWR	1964
New Passage Pier	GWR	1886
New Radnor	GWR	1951
New Romney and Littlestone-on-Sea	South Eastern Railway (UK)	1967
New Tredegar and Tir Phil	Brecon and Merthyr Railway	1962
New Wandsworth	London, Brighton and South Coast Railway	1869
Newarthill	Caledonian	1880
Newbiggin-by-the-Sea	NER	1964
Newbigging	Caledonian	1945
Newbridge (Monmouthshire)	GWR	1962 reopened 2008
Newbridge on Wye	Cambrian Railways	1962
Newburgh	North British Railway	1955
Newburn	NER	1958
Newbury West Fields Halt	GWR	1957
Newby Bridge	Furness Railway	1949 reopened 1973
Newby Wiske	NER	1946
Newcastle (Carliol Square)	Newcastle and North Shields Railway	1850
Newcastle Crossing	L&NWR	1918
Newcastle Emlyn	GWR	1952
Newcastle Forth	Newcastle and Carlisle Railway	1851
Newcastle New Bridge Street	NER	1909
Newcastle (Shot Tower)	Newcastle and Carlisle Railway	1847
Newcastleton	North British Railway	1969
Newcastle-under-Lyme	North Staffordshire Railway	1964
Newchapel and Goldenhill	North Staffordshire Railway	1964
Newchurch Halt	L&NER	1964
Newchurch (Isle of Wight)	Isle of Wight Central Railway	1956
Newent	GWR	1959
Newhailes	North British Railway	1950
Newham (Northumberland)	NER	1950
Newham (Truro)	West Cornwall Railway	1863
Newhaven	Caledonian Railway	1962
Newhaven Marine	London, Brighton and South Coast Railway	2006 (Note: although the station was closed in 2006, it remained legally open until 2020, where it was formally closed)
Newhey	Lancashire and Yorkshire Railway	2009
Newhouse	Caledonian Railway	1930
Newick & Chailey	London, Brighton and South Coast Railway	1958
Newington (Edinburgh)	North British Railway	1962
Newland	GWR	1917
Newland Halt	GWR	1965
Newlay and Horsforth	Midland Railway	1965
Newmachar	Great North of Scotland Railway	1965
Newmains	Caledonian Railway	1930
Newmarket High Level	Newmarket and Chesterford Railway	1902
Newmarket Warren Hill	GER	1945?
Newmilns	Glasgow and South Western Railway	1964
Newnham	GWR	1964
Newnham Bridge	GWR	1962
Newpark	Caledonian Railway	1959
Newport (Isle of Wight)	Freshwater, Yarmouth and Newport Railway	1923
Newport (Isle of Wight)	Isle of Wight Central Railway	1966
Newport (Shropshire)	L&NWR	1964
Newport (Teesside)	NER	1915
Newport Courtybella	Monmouthshire Railway and Canal Company	1852
Newport Dock Street	GWR	1880
Newport Marshes Turnpike Gate (Monmouthshire)	Monmouthshire Railway and Canal Company	1853
Newport Mill Street (Monmouthshire)	GWR	1880
Newport Pagnell	L&NWR	1964
Newport (Pan Lane)	Isle of Wight (Newport Junction) Railway	1879
Newport-on-Tay East	North British Railway	1969
Newport-on-Tay West	North British Railway	1969
Newseat	Great North of Scotland Railway	1965
Newsham	NER	1964 reopened 2025
Newsholme	Lancashire and Yorkshire Railway	1957
Newstead (Borders)	North British Railway	1852
Newstead and Annesley (Nottinghamshire)	GNR	1931
Newstead West (Nottinghamshire)	Midland Railway	1964
Newthorpe, Greasley and Shipley Gate	GNR	1963
Newton (Whitehaven)	Whitehaven and Furness Junction Railway	1852
Newton Heath (Manchester)	Lancashire and Yorkshire Railway	1966
Newton Kyme	NER	1964
Newton Poppleford	London and South Western Railway	1967
Newton Road	L&NWR	1863; 1902; 1945
Newton Stewart	Portpatrick and Wigtownshire Railway	1965
Newton Tony	London and South Western Railway	1952
Newtonairds	Glasgow and South Western Railway	1943
Newtongrange	North British Railway	1969 new station opened 2015
Newtonhead	Glasgow and South Western Railway	1868
Newtonhill	Caledonian Railway	1956
Newtown Halt	Midland and Great Northern Railway	1959
Newtyle	Caledonian Railway	1868; 1955
Neyland	GWR	1964

=== Ni ===
Station (Town, unless in station name)	Rail company	Year closed
Nidd Bridge	NER	1962
Niddrie	North British Railway	1869
Nigg	Highland Railway	1960
Nightingale Valley Halt	GWR	1929
Nine Elms	London and South Western Railway	1848
Nine Mile Point	L&NWR	1959
Ninewells	Caledonian Railway	1865
Ningwood (Isle of Wight)	Freshwater, Yarmouth and Newport Railway	1953
Nisbet	North British Railway	1948

=== No ===
Station (Town, unless in station name)	Rail company	Year closed
No. 4 Passing Place	Grimsby and Immingham Tramway	1917
No. 5 Passing Place	Grimsby and Immingham Tramway	1961
No. 6 Passing Place	Grimsby and Immingham Tramway	1917
Nocton and Dunston	Great Northern and Great Eastern Joint Railway	1955
Noel Park and Wood Green	GER	1963
Nook Pasture	North British Railway	1874
Norbury and Ellaston (Derbyshire)	North Staffordshire Railway	1954
Norham	NER	1964
Normacot	North Staffordshire Railway	1964
North Acton	GWR	1947
North Acton Halt	GWR	1913
North Bridge	Halifax and Ovenden Junction Railway	1955
North Cave	Hull and Barnsley Railway	1955
North Connel	Caledonian Railway	1966
North Drove	Midland and Great Northern Joint Railway	1958
North Eastrington	Hull and Barnsley Railway	1955
North Elmham	GER	1964
North End	East and West Junction Railway	1877
North Filton Platform	GWR	1964
North Greenwich	GER	1926
North Grimston	NER	1950
North Hayling	London, Brighton and South Coast Railway	1963
North Kent Junction	South Eastern Railway	1850
North Kelsey	Great Central Railway	1965
North Leith	North British Railway	1947
North Lonsdale Crossing	Furness Railway	1916
North Queensferry Pier	North British Railway	1890
North Rhondda Halt	South Wales Mineral Railway	1930
North Rode	North Staffordshire Railway	1962
North Seaton	NER	1964
North Skelton	NER	1951
North Sunderland	North Sunderland Railway	1951
North Tawton	London and South Western Railway	1972
North Thoresby	GNR	1970
North Walsall	Midland Railway	1925
North Walsham Town	Midland and Great Northern Joint Railway	1959
North Water Bridge Halt	North British Railway	1951
North Weald (London Underground)	Eastern Counties Railway	1994
North Woolwich	GER	2006
North Wootton	GER	1969
North Wylam	NER	1968
Northallerton Low Level	NER	1901
Northallerton Town	Leeds Northern Railway	1856
Northam (North Devon)	Bideford, Westward Ho! and Appledore Railway	1917
Northam (Southampton)	London and South Western Railway	1966
Northam Road (Southampton)	London and South Western Railway	1840
Northampton Bridge Street	L&NWR	1964
Northampton St. John's Street	Midland Railway	1939
Northenden	Cheshire Lines Committee	1964
Northiam	Kent and East Sussex Railway	1954 reopened 1990
Northolt	GWR	1948
Northorpe (Lincs)	Great Central Railway	1955
Northorpe Higher	L&NWR	1953
Northorpe North Road	Lancashire and Yorkshire Railway	1965
Norton (Cheshire)	Birkenhead Railway	1952
Norton (Worcestershire)	Midland Railway	1846
Norton (South Yorkshire)	Lancashire and Yorkshire Railway	1947
Norton Bridge	London and North Western Railway	2004 (Note: Although services have been suspended since 2004, the station remained legally open until 2017, where it was formally closed. This happened just as West Midlands Trains took over the operations of London Midland)
Norton Fitzwarren	GWR	1961
Norton Halt	GWR	1966
Norton Junction	NER	1870
Norton Road	Swansea and Mumbles Railway	1960
Norton-in-Hales	North Staffordshire Railway	1956
Norton-on-Tees	NER	1960
Norwich City	Midland and Great Northern Joint Railway	1959
Norwich Trowse	GER	1845; 1939
Norwich Victoria	GER	1916
Nostell	West Riding and Grimsby Railway	1951
Notgrove	GWR	1962
Nottage Halt	GWR	1963
Nottingham Arkwright Street	Great Central Railway	1969
Nottingham Carrington Street	MR	1848
Nottingham London Road High Level	GNR	1967
Nottingham London Road Low Level	GNR	1944
Nottingham Racecourse	GNR	1959
Nottingham Victoria	Nottingham Joint Station Committee	1967
Notton and Royston	Great Central Railway	1930

=== Nu ===
Station (Town, unless in station name)	Rail company	Year closed
Nunburnholme	York and North Midland Railway	1951
Nuneaton Abbey Street	Midland Railway	1968
Nuneaton Bridge	Midland Railway	1887
Nunnington	NER	1953
Nursling	London and South Western Railway	1957

== O ==
Station (Town, unless in station name)	Rail company	Year closed
Oakamoor	North Staffordshire Railway	1965
Oakdale Halt	GWR	1932
Oakengates Market Street	L&NWR	1952
Oakenshaw	Midland Railway	1870
Oakington	GER	1970
Oakle Street	GWR	1964
Oakley (Bedford)	Midland Railway	1958
Oakley (Fife)	North British Railway	1968
Oakley (Hampshire)	London and South Western Railway	1963
Oaksey Halt	GWR	1964
Oakwellgate	Newcastle and Darlington Junction Railway	1844
Oatlands	Cleator and Workington Junction Railway	1922
Occumster	Highland	1944
Ocean Quay (Plymouth)	London and South Western Railway	1910
Ochiltree	Glasgow and South Western Railway	1951
Ocker Hill	L&NWR	1916
Oddingley	Midland Railway	1855
Oddington Halt	L&NWR	1926
Offord and Buckden	GNR	1959
Ogbourne	Midland and South Western Junction Railway	1961
Ogilvie Colliery Halt	Great Western Railway	1962
Ogilvie Village Halt	GWR	1962
Ogmore Vale	GWR	1958
Okehampton	London and South Western Railway	1972 fully reopened 2021
Old Colwyn	L&NWR	1952
Old Dalby	Midland Railway	1966
Old Ford	North London Railway	1944
Old Hill (High Street) Halt	GWR	1964
Old Kent Road and Hatcham	London, Brighton and South Coast Railway	1917
Old Kilpatrick	Caledonian Railway	1964
Old Leake	GNR	1956
Old Meldrum	Great North of Scotland Railway	1931
Old Mill Lane	L&NWR	1951
Old North Road	L&NWR	1968
Old Oak Lane Halt	GWR	1947
Old Ynysybwl Halt	Taff Vale Railway	1952
Oldbury	GWR	1915
Oldfield Road (Salford)	Lancashire and Yorkshire Railway	1872
Oldham Central	Lancashire and Yorkshire Railway	1966
Oldham Clegg Street	Oldham, Ashton and Guide Bridge Junction Railway	1959
Oldham Glodwick Road	L&NWR	1955
Oldham Mumps (LNWR)	L&NWR	1862
Oldham Mumps	Lancashire and Yorkshire Railway	2009
Oldham Werneth	Lancashire and Yorkshire Railway	2009
Oldham Road (Ashton-under-Lyne)	Oldham, Ashton and Guide Bridge Junction Railway	1959
Oldham Road (Manchester)	Manchester and Leeds Railway	1844
Oldland Common	LM&SR	1966
Oldwoods Halt	GWR	1960
Ollerton	LD&ECR	1955
Olmarch Halt	GWR	1965
Olney	Midland Railway	1962
Ongar	Eastern Counties Railway	1994
Onibury	Shrewsbury and Hereford Railway	1958
Onllwyn	Neath and Brecon Railway	1962
Orbliston	Highland Railway	1964
Ordens Halt	Great North of Scotland Railway	1964
Ordsall Lane	L&NWR	1957
Oreston	London and South Western Railway	1951
Ormiston	North British Railway	1933
Ormside	Midland Railway	1952
Orton	Highland Railway	1964
Orton Waterville	L&NWR	1942
Orwell	GER	1959
Osbaldwick	Derwent Valley Light Railway	1915
Osmondthorpe	LNER	1960
Ossett	GNR	1964
Oswestry	GWR	1924
Oswestry	Cambrian Railways	1966
Otley	Otley and Ilkley Joint Railway	1965
Otterham	London and South Western Railway	1966
Otterington	NER	1958
Otterspool	Cheshire Lines Committee	1951
Ottery St Mary	London and South Western Railway	1967
Ottringham	NER	1964
Oughty Bridge	Sheffield, Ashton-under-Lyne and Manchester Railway	1959
Oundle	L&NWR	1964
Ouse Bridge	GER	1864
Outwell Basin	GER	1928
Outwell Village	GER	1928
Ovenden	Halifax and Ovenden Joint Railway	1955
Over and Wharton	L&NWR	1947
Overseal and Moira	Ashby and Nuneaton Joint Railway	1890
Overstrand	Norfolk and Suffolk Joint Railway	1953
Overton-on-Dee	Cambrian Railways	1962
Overtown	Caledonian Railway	1881
Oxford (Banbury Road)	London and North Western Railway	1851
Oxford (Grandpont)	Great Western Railway	1852
Oxford Lane Halt	Wantage Tramway	1925
Oxford Rewley Road	L&NWR	1951
Oxford Road Halt	L&NWR	1926
Oxheys	Lancaster and Preston Junction Railway	1925
Oxspring	Sheffield, Ashton-Under-Lyne and Manchester Railway	1847
Oxton	North British Railway	1932
Oyne	Great North of Scotland Railway	1968
Oystermouth	Swansea and Mumbles Railway	1960
