= Newmarket station =

Newmarket station may refer to:

== Europe ==
In Newmarket, Suffolk, UK:

- Newmarket (High Level) railway station, opened 1848 by the Newmarket and Chesterford Railway
- Newmarket Warren Hill railway station, opened 1885 by the Great Eastern Railway
- Newmarket railway station (Suffolk), opened 1902 by the Great Eastern Railway

== North America ==
- Newmarket station (MBTA), in Boston, Massachusetts, USA
- Newmarket GO Station in Newmarket, Ontario, Canada

== Oceania ==
- Newmarket railway station, Brisbane, in Queensland, Australia
- Newmarket railway station, Melbourne, in Victoria, Australia
- Newmarket railway station, Auckland, in Auckland, New Zealand

== See also ==
- Newmarket Bus Terminal, Newmarket, Canada
- Newmarket railway substation, an electrical substation, in Melbourne, Victoria, Australia
- Nieuwmarkt metro station in Amsterdam, Netherlands
