= Southend railway station =

Southend railway station may refer to one of four railway stations in Southend-on-Sea, England:

- Southend Airport railway station on the Shenfield to Southend Line
- Southend Central railway station on the London, Tilbury and Southend line
- Southend East railway station on the London, Tilbury and Southend line
- Southend Victoria railway station on the Shenfield to Southend Line

It may also refer to

- Southend railway station (Mumbles), closed 1960 on the Swansea and Mumbles Railway
