= Brymbo railway station =

Brymbo railway station may refer to:

- Brymbo railway station (Great Western Railway), a station in Brymbo, Wales, on the Wrexham and Minera Railway
- Brymbo railway station (Great Central Railway), in the same town, on the Wrexham, Mold and Connah's Quay Railway
