= Elmbridge =

Elmbridge may refer to these places in England:

Current uses

- Borough of Elmbridge, a 37-square-mile (96 km^{2}) district in northwest Surrey
- Elmbridge, Gloucester, Gloucestershire, a suburb and electoral ward
- Elmbridge, Worcestershire, a small village and 3-square-mile (7.8 km^{2}) civil parish

Historic uses

- Hundred of Elmbridge, Emelybridge or Amelebridge, a very old division of Surrey
- Elmbridge railway station, an 1883-1966 tramway station next to Wisbech, Cambridgeshire (closed to passengers in 1928)
