= Upwell railway station =

Former railway station in England

Coordinates: 52°36′00″N 0°13′27″E

Upwell railway station was a station in Upwell, Norfolk on the Wisbech and Upwell Tramway. It was opened in 1883 to carry passengers and agricultural wares to Wisbech where they would go to market, or be shipped off to other towns or cities. Competition with motor buses led to the station's closure to passenger services in 1928, along with the rest of the line.

The line featured in BBC tv film by reporter Fyfe Robertson in 1964. Goods services continued until 1966, carrying produce from the surrounding farms; these are now carried by road.

Following closure the line to Wisbech was taken up. The village signs in Upwell still bear a picture of a tram recognising the heritage of the settlement. It was during several visits that the Reverend .W. Awdry, author of the Railway Series, was inspired to come up with the character of Toby the Tram Engine modelled on the trams that worked the line.

The site of the former station has recently been converted into a car park for the health centre (doctors' surgery) in Upwell.

Former Services

Preceding station	Disused railways	Following station
Outwell Village	Wisbech & Upwell; Tramway	Terminus

Reverend W. Awdry used to live in the old vicarage in Emneth, from the window in his attic he could see the trams acting. This led to him inventing the characters Toby the Tram Engine and later on Mavis in Thomas the Tank Engine.
