= Plas Power railway station =

Plas Power railway station may refer to the following Welsh stations:

- Plas Power railway station (Wrexham, Mold and Connah's Quay Railway)
- Plas Power railway station (Wrexham and Minera Railway)
