= Boyces Bridge railway station =

Disused railway station in England

Coordinates: 52.62965°N 0.20938°E

Boyces Bridge railway station was a station in Norfolk on the Wisbech and Upwell Tramway commonly known as the Upwell Tramway. It was located north of Outwell. It was opened in 1883 along with the rest of the line, and closed to passengers in 1928 and goods in 1966.

Former Services

Preceding station	Disused railways	Following station
Elmbridge	Wisbech & Upwell; Tramway	Outwell Basin
