= Marshes Turnpike Gate railway station =

Former Monmouthshire Railway and Canal Company station

Marshes Turnpike Gate

General information
- Location: Newport, Newport; Wales
- Coordinates: 51.5940°N 2.9975°W
- Grid reference: ST309888
- Platforms: ?

Other information
- Status: Disused

History
- Original company: Monmouthshire Railway and Canal Company

Key dates
- 1 July 1852: Opened
- 9 March 1853: Closed
Location

Marshes Turnpike Gate railway station was a temporary station opened by the Monmouthshire Railway and Canal Company in central Newport, Wales.

== History ==
A part of Monmouthshire at the time, the station was opened on 1 July 1852 as the temporary southern terminus of the Monmouthshire Railway and Canal Company's Eastern Valleys line to Pontypool Crane Street. The Act of Parliament authorising the line had been passed in 1845 and works had begun soon afterwards with a projected completion date of August 1849. However, due to the Panic of 1847, works were abandoned prompting disgruntled shareholders to enforce the "Cardwell Clause" in the Act which prevented the distribution of company profits as dividends until such time as the line had been completed. Works restarted in 1851, with the contract for the ballasting and laying of the track from Pontypool to The Marshes Foundry at Newport awarded to the contractors Giles and Morgan for £2,935. No booking office was provided at Marshes Turnpike Gate and passengers had to purchase their tickets at the Lock Office on the High Street.

An inauguration ceremony was held on 30 June 1852. The cannons and band of the 48th Regiment were present at Marshes Turnpike Gate for the departure of the first train at 2.30pm. Regular services on the line commenced on 1 July 1852 and consisted of three passenger trains each way at 7.00am, 12.00pm and 4.00pm from Newport, and 10.00am, 2.00pm and 6.00pm for the return journey. The line was worked by two new engines, numbers 17 and 18, with two composite coaches, four second class and six third class carriages provided by Wrights of Birmingham.

With the first section of the Eastern Valleys line open to traffic, work began on extending the line towards Newport Dock Street. This required the construction of a wooden viaduct to carry the line over The Marshes, as well as the diversion of the Monmouthshire and Brecon Canal at the Dos Foundry. A new station was opened a quarter of a mile to the south at Newport Mill Street on 9 March 1853, allowing for the closure of the temporary Marshes Turnpike Gate.

Preceding station	Disused railways	Following station
Llantarnam (MR&C); Line and station closed	Monmouthshire Railway and Canal Company	Terminus

== Present ==
All traces of the passenger station had disappeared by 1960 and the station site has now been replaced by roads running north from Newport city centre to the M4 motorway.

== See also ==
- Railway stations in Newport
