= Outwell Village railway station =

Former railway station in England

Coordinates: 52.6099°N 0.2331°E

Outwell Village railway station was a station in Outwell, Norfolk on the Wisbech and Upwell Tramway. It opened in 1884 and closed to passengers in 1928. Goods services ran on a while longer, before finishing in 1966. The line provided inspiration for Toby the Tram Engine.

Preceding station	Disused railways	Following station
Outwell Basin	Wisbech & Upwell; Tramway	Upwell
