= Three Holes =

Hamlet in Norfolk, England

Coordinates: 52°34′52″N 0°13′05″E

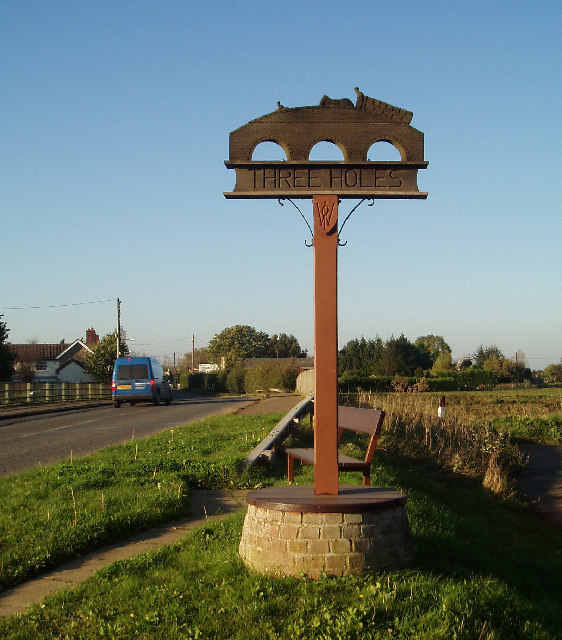
Three Holes village sign showing a three-arched bridge

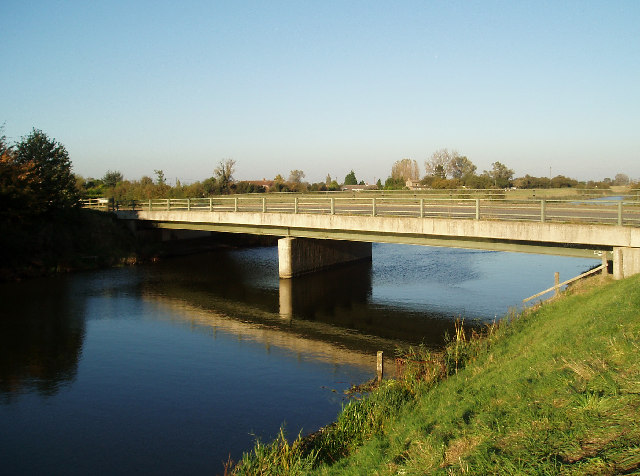
Modern bridge over the Middle Level Main Drain

Three Holes is a hamlet in the parish of Upwell in Norfolk, England. It is named for a former bridge over a nearby dike, which is illustrated on the town sign. It is just within the Norfolk boundary, on the A1101 between Ely and Wisbech. Located on the border of Norfolk and Cambridgeshire, the two sides of the river are in separate counties.
