= Sander's Mill, Upwell =

Windmill in Upwell, Norfolk, England

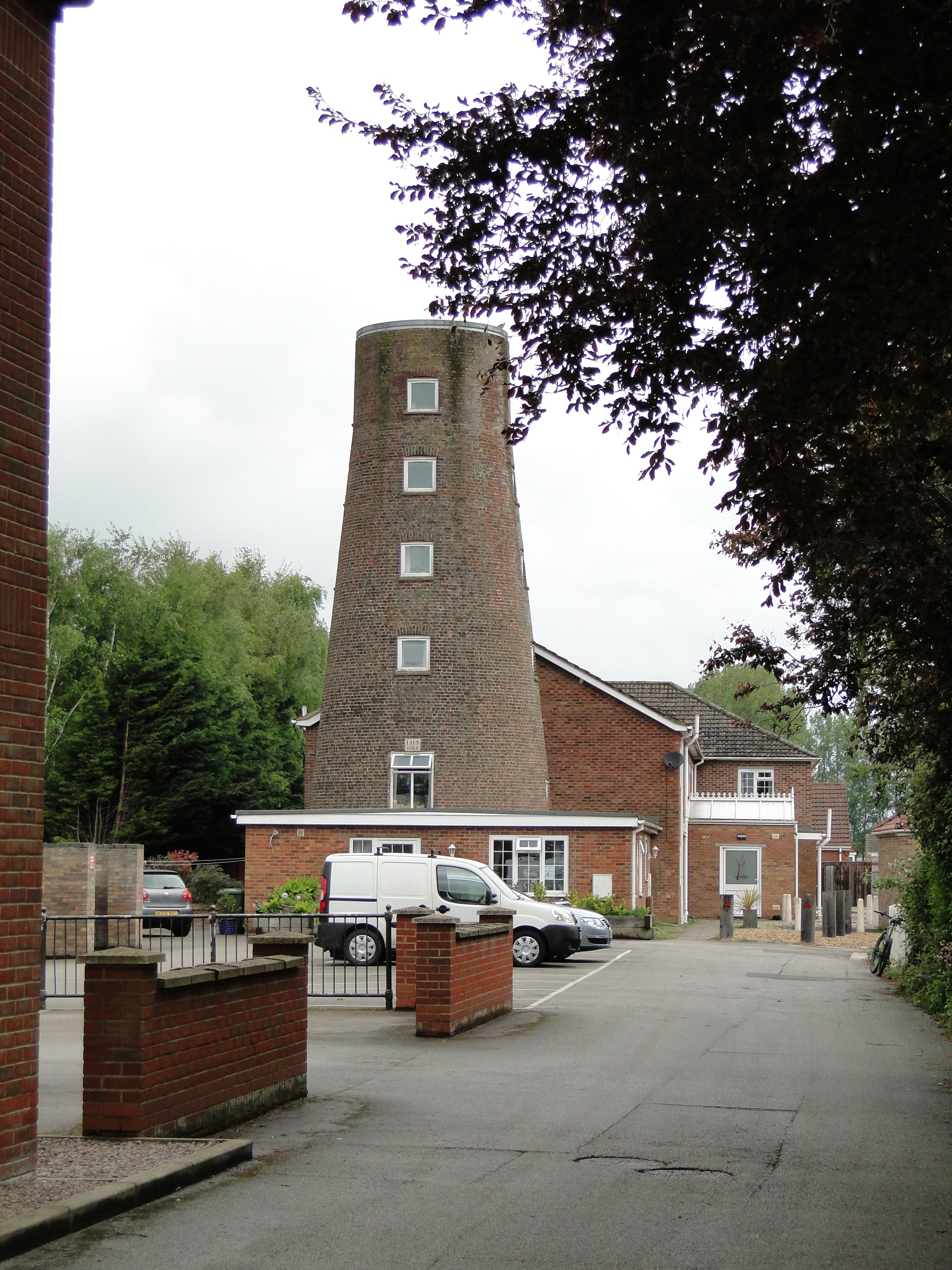
- Sander's Mill, May 2019
- Interactive map of Sander's Mill, Upwell

Origin
- Mill name: Sander's Mill, Shepherd's Mill
- Mill location: Upwell, Norfolk, United Kingdom
- Grid reference: TF 5095 0330
- Coordinates: 52°36′23″N 0°13′39″E
- Year built: 1829

Information
- Purpose: Corn mill
- Type: Tower mill
- Storeys: Five storeys, later six storeys
- No. of sails: Five, later four
- Type of sails: Patent sails
- Windshaft: Cast iron
- Winding: Fantail
- Fantail blades: Eight
- Auxiliary power: Steam engine, later electric motor.
- No. of pairs of millstones: Three pairs
- Other information: Mill stood in Cambridgeshire until 1990.

Sander's Mill is a Grade II listed tower mill in Upwell, Norfolk, United Kingdom. Originally standing in Cambridgeshire, it had five sails when built. Later raised by one storey and converted to four sails, it worked by wind until 1940, then by electricity.

== History ==
Sander's Mill was built in 1829 by John Hopkins Sanders, who was the miller until 1836. A five storey tower mill when built, it stood on the Isle of Ely in Cambridgeshire. It was originally built with five sails and drove two pairs of millstones The mill was offered for sale by auction in September 1836 following the death of Sanders. It was offered for sale in 1860, the miller then was Thomas Berry. Later millers were Thomas Shepherd from 1872 to 1883 and William Shepherd from 1896 to 1904. The mill was raised in height by one storey at some point before 1894. It was probably at this point that the mill was converted to a four sailer. A steam engine had been installed as auxiliary power by 1896. Later, and electric motor was used. The mill worked by wind until 1940, when it lost a pair of sails. Milling continued by electricity. The other pair of sails and the cap were removed in 1951. A flat concrete roof was fitted to the tower.

By 1976, the mill was being used as an equestrian centre and hotel. It was listed Grade II on 31 October 1983. The mill was sold to Mr. and Mrs. Brown in 1985, who planned to reinstate the cap. The work was proposed to be done by John Lawn, the Caston millwright. The county boundary between Norfolk and Cambridgeshire was altered in 1990, bringing the mill into Norfolk. At one point, the mill was used as a restaurant. This closed in 2007 and the mill had been converted to residential use by 2009.

== Description ==
Sander's Mill is a six storey tower mill. It had an ogee cap with a petticoat and gallery. Built with five Patent sails, latterly, four Patent sails were carried on a cast iron windshaft. The sails were an odd set, with one pair of double sails and one pair of single sails. Winding was by an eight-bladed fantail. Three pairs of French Burr millstones were driven.
