= Cleland (Old) railway station =

Former railway station in Lanarkshire, Scotland

Cleland (Old)
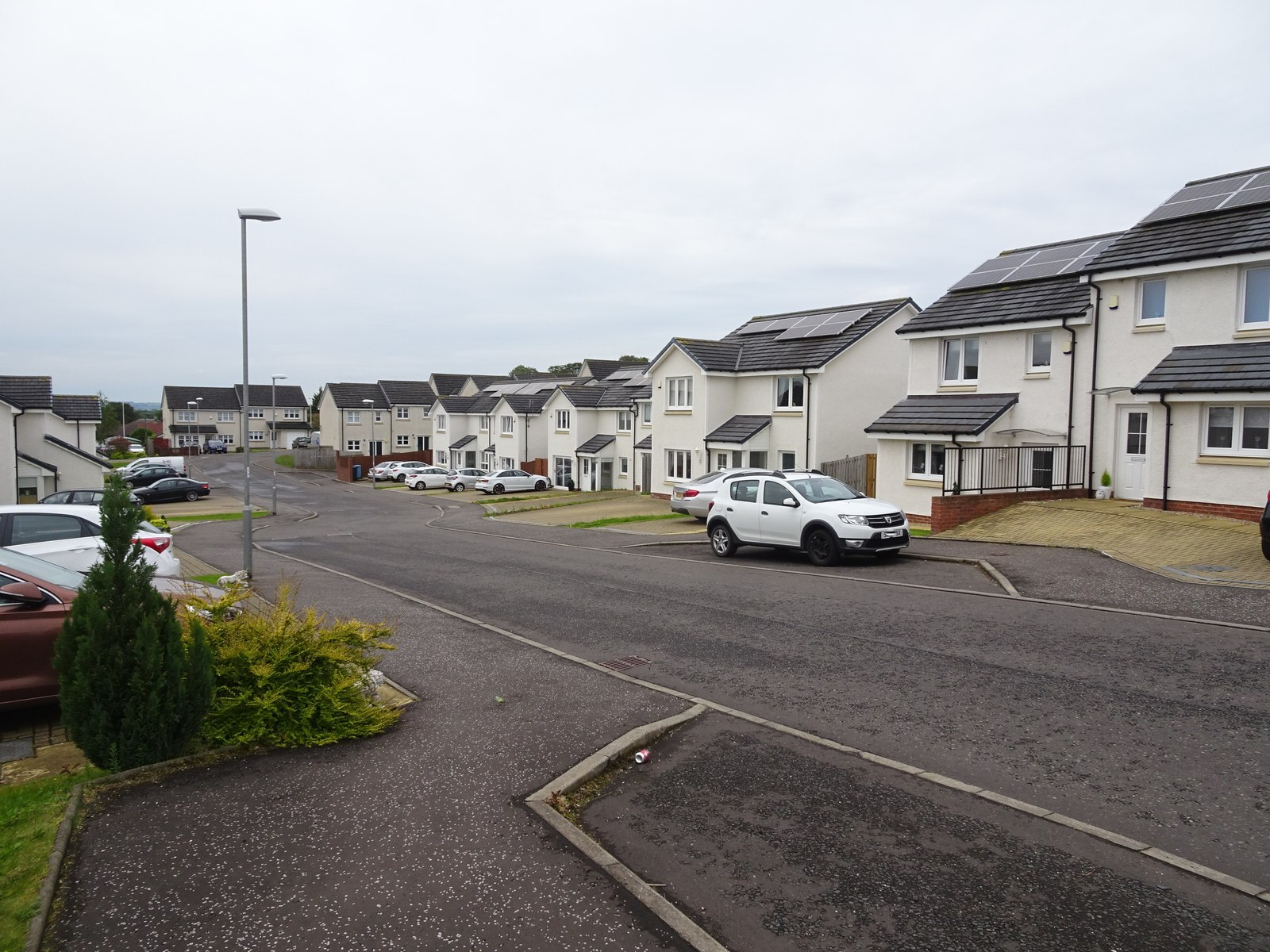
- The site of the station in 2019

General information
- Location: Cleland, North Lanarkshire; Scotland
- Coordinates: 55.799°N 3.915°W
- Grid reference: NS800579
- Platforms: 1

Other information
- Status: Disused

History
- Original company: Caledonian Railway
- Pre-grouping: London, Midland and Scottish Railway

Key dates
- 15 May 1867: Opened
- 1 January 1917: Closed
- 1 June 1919: Reopened
- 1 December 1930: Closed
Location

Cleland (Old) railway station was opened in 1867 on the Cleland to Morningside Junction line that had opened in 1864. The extension of the Cleland Branch on the line of the old Wishaw and Coltness Railway joined the Coltness Branch section of the Wishaw and Coltness Railway via the Coltness Ironworks and then as stated it continued to Morningside.

Today's Cleland railway station on the Shotts Line was opened as Bellside on 9 July 1869 by the Caledonian Railway, renamed Omoa after the Omoa Ironworks on 1 October 1879 and finally named Cleland on 1 October 1941 after the original Cleland had closed.

== History ==
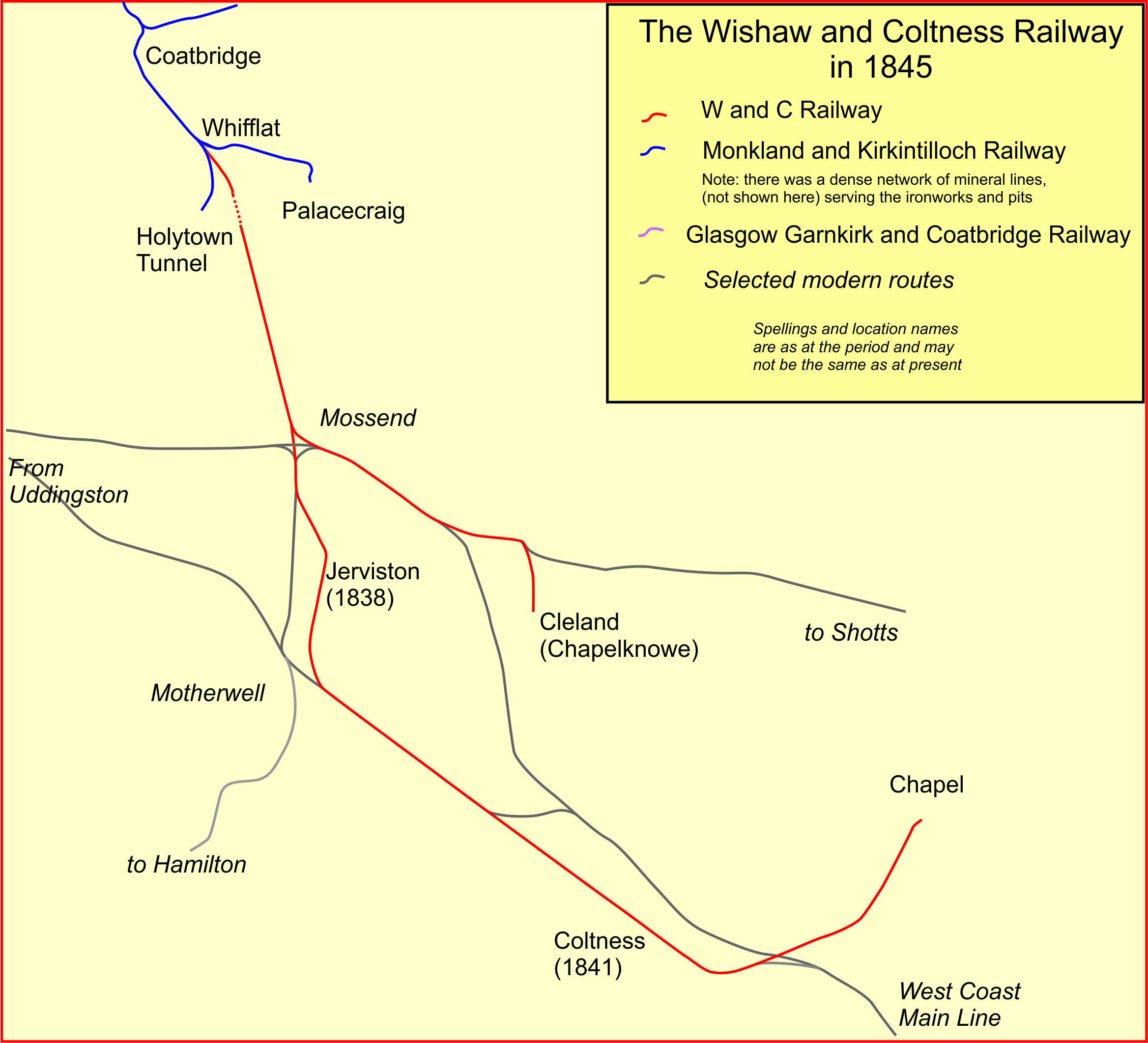
Wishaw and Coltness Railway system in 1845

Cleland was opened in 1867 and was located on the Cleland to Morningside Junction line that had opened in 1864. The old Wishaw and Coltness Railway branch from Mossend that served the Omoa Ironworks was utilised for part of the route west of Cleland that once ran from Mossend. Improvements were made by the Caledonian Railway to the trackbed and formation.

== Infrastructure ==
A single storey station building with an outbuilding and signal box was fronted by a single curved platform located on the northern, town side, of the line reached by Cleland Station Road. The small goods yard was accessed via Wishaw High Road and had a water tank, crane, loading dock and associated buildings stood either side of a mineral line that serviced Sunnyside Colliery in the 1890s however it had closed by 1910. Spindleside Colliery (Pits No. 6 & 7) had opened by 1910 and stood close by on the Cleland Extension line. It had in turn closed by 1939.

== The site today ==
A small length of the platform remained visible until at least 1997 however nothing remains of the station as it has been totally demolished to make way for a housing scheme that now stands on the site of the station and trackbed, however the Station Road name provides a link with the past. The trackbed to the west has a footpath on it. A section of the old trackbed survives running east towards Morningside (Datum 2018).

Preceding station	Disused railways	Following station
Carfin Station	Cleland Extension Caledonian Railway	Newmains
