= Upwell =

Village in Norfolk, England

Coordinates: 52.59564°N 0.21342°E

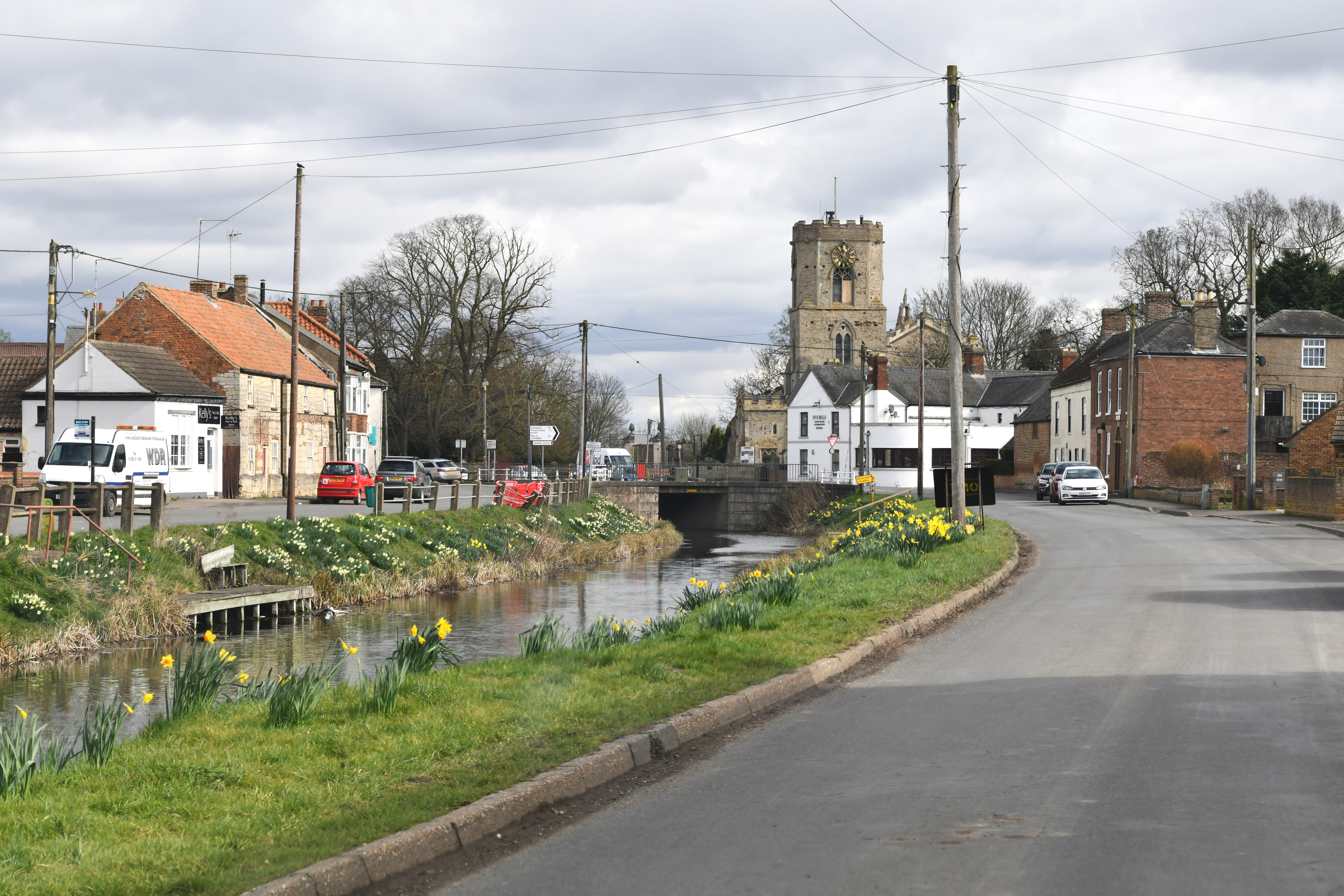
- View of Upwell in 2025 showing St Peters Road and Well Creek

- Location within Norfolk
- Area: 27.65 km^{2} (10.68 sq mi)
- Population: 4,734
  - Density: 171/km^{2} (440/sq mi)
- OS grid reference: TF500020
- Civil parish: Upwell
- District: King's Lynn and West Norfolk
- Shire county: Norfolk
- Region: East
- Country: England
- Sovereign state: United Kingdom
- Post town: WISBECH
- Postcode district: PE14
- Police: Norfolk
- Fire: Norfolk
- Ambulance: East of England

Upwell is a village and civil parish in the English county of Norfolk. Upwell village is on the A1101 road, as is Outwell, its conjoined village at the north. The nearest towns are Wisbech to the north-west and Downham Market to the east.

Three Holes is a hamlet in the parish of Upwell. The parish covers an area of 27.65 km^{2} (10.68 sq mi) and had a population of 2,456 in 1,033 households at the 2001 census, increasing to 2,750 at the 2011 Census. And most recently, In the 2021 census the population has nearly doubled to 4,734.

== History ==
The villages name means 'higher well (= spring/stream)'. Originally, part of a single place called Well; 'upp' was prepended to distinguish from Outwell.

Upwell in 1202 had a market-place and a weekly market. Marmont Priory was endowed by Richard I with 300 acres in Upwell and Outwell. The priory of Gilbertines was founded in the reign of King John. Cultivation of flax and hemp is referred to in an order of Sessions of Sewers in 1340.

William Wolsey a constable of Upwell, Outwell & Welney (and Robert Piggot of Wisbech) Protestants were tried at Ely for heresy and burnt at the stake in 1555.

In 1810 a building was being used as a temporary theatre by Joseph Smedley at a cost of five Guineas.

In 1869 Upwell St Peter, was the richest benefice of the English church, being returned in the clergy list as worth £3,058 a year, though worth considerably more, and had just become vacant by the death of the Rev. William Gale Townley, who had held it only seven years. The living was in the gift of B. G. Townley. In the same parish was the rectory of Christ Church, returned as being worth £1,594 year, also belonging to the Townley family.

Sander's Mill was built in 1829 as a five storey, five-sailed tower mill. It was later raised by one storey and altered to a four-sailed mill. It worked by wind until 1940 and then by electricity. It was converted to residential use in 2009.

Upwell was connected with Wisbech by a steam tramway in 1884.

== Governance ==
Upwell has a parish council. The parish falls within the electoral ward of Upwell and Delph. The population of this ward at the 2011 Census was 4,827.

For the purposes of local government, it falls within the district of King's Lynn and West Norfolk. Until 1974 it formed part of the Marshland Rural District.

== See also ==
- Upwell railway station
