= Porthcawl railway station =

Former railway station in South Wales

Porthcawl
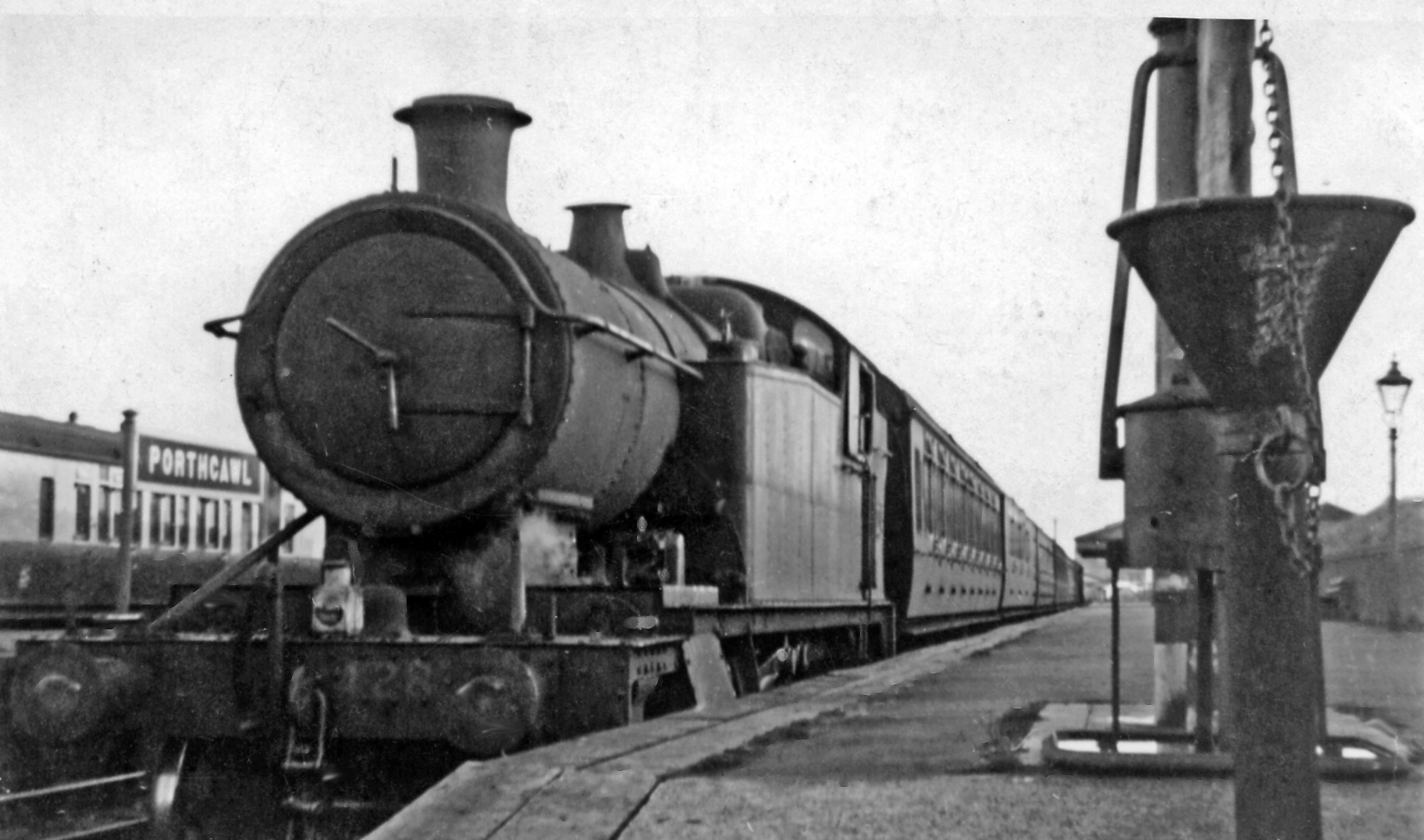
- Porthcawl station in the 1940s

General information
- Location: Porthcawl, Bridgend; Wales
- Coordinates: 51.4811°N 3.7021°W
- Platforms: 3

Other information
- Status: Disused

History
- Original company: Duffryn Llynfi & Porthcawl Railway

Key dates
- 1828: Opened as tramway
- 1865: Converted to railway
- 6 March 1916: Rebuilt and resited
- 9 September 1963: Closed
Location

Porthcawl railway station served the seaside resort of Porthcawl in South Wales. It closed in 1963.

== History ==
The first railway at Porthcawl was the 4 ft 7 in (1,397 mm) gauge Duffryn Llynvi and Porthcawl Railway, a horse-drawn tramway. Construction began in 1825 and it opened in 1829; the tram rails were laid on stone sleepers. It was built to carry minerals from South Wales to the harbour at Porthcawl. It ran from Duffryn Llynfi near Maesteg, via Tondu and Pyle, and was extended to Bridgend in 1834.

The South Wales Railway, which passed through both Bridgend and Pyle, opened in 1850. The Llynfi Valley Railway took over the original company in 1847 and upgraded both the former tramway branches, reopening them as broad gauge railways on 10 August 1861. Porthcawl station opened 1 August 1865. The Llynfi Valley Railway merged with the Ogmore Valley Railway in 1866, creating the Llynvi and Ogmore Railway.

Despite the conversion to a railway, trains on the Porthcawl branch continued to be drawn by horses until 1868, when the system was altered again to standard gauge. The Llynvi and Ogmore Railway was taken over by the Great Western Railway in 1873.

By the early 20th century, Porthcawl grew in importance as a destination for holiday traffic; in 1916, the GWR rebuilt the station on a new site. Despite the fact that it had been built a mile nearer to the seafront, the new station was not universally popular; the building was a rather insubstantial structure built of wood and asbestos and, whilst the original station had possessed a footbridge, the GWR did not supply one for the new station, despite the increase from two to three platforms. Passengers using the more remote platforms were obliged to make a long detour via a link at the end of the platforms. A special gate was provided at the end of the departure platform for the use of day-trippers. The original station's turntable was not replaced, but remained derelict on-site for many years. In the decades following the opening of the new station, passenger numbers remained high, with around 70,000 passengers using the station.

Its closure came in 1963, despite the fact that the branch was still well-used; the move was very unpopular with local businesses and residents alike. Poor ticket sales from Porthcawl station itself were used to justify the closure, but the fact that most travellers bought their tickets to, rather than from, Porthcawl (the ticket sale therefore recorded elsewhere), the plea was ignored.

Preceding station	Disused railways	Following station
Nottage Halt; Line and station closed	Great Western Railway; Porthcawl branch	Terminus

== The site today ==
The trackbed is occupied by a road. The station building is used by the Porthcawl branch of the Sea Cadets.
