= Outwell Basin railway station =

Former railway station in England

Coordinates: 52.6192°N 0.2237°E

Outwell Basin railway station was a stop on the Wisbech and Upwell Tramway in Outwell, Norfolk. It opened in 1883 carrying passenger and goods traffic from nearby farms. It was closed to passengers in 1928, with goods services continuing on the line until 1966. The line it once stood on is now a grassy track.

Former Services

Preceding station	Disused railways	Following station
Boyces Bridge	Wisbech & Upwell; Tramway	Outwell Village
