= Marmont Priory =

Coordinates: 52.5900°N 0.2030°E

Marmont Priory (also Welles or Mirmaud) was a priory for Gilbertine Canons in Cambridgeshire, England. It was established by landowner Ralph de Hauvill (keeper of two of the King's Falcons) as a small priory or chantry of three canons who prayed for the souls of de Hauvill and his wife, Maud. Fifteen years earlier, Maud had a vision of Gilbert of Sempringham ascending to Heaven on the day of his death.

The endowment to create the priory was authorised by King John in May 1204 on the proviso that the canons would pray daily for the soul of his mother, Eleanor of Aquitaine, who had died in April of that year. Never a wealthy priory, it held lands in Upwell and Walsoken and used St Peter's, Upwell as its church. By its dissolution in 1538 it was a cell of Watton Priory.

Formerly in the Isle of Ely, owing to a change of the county border, the site of Marmont on the old course of the River Nene near Upwell is now in Norfolk. The site is occupied by an 18th-century farmhouse, Priory Farm. Skeletal remains have been found at the site.
