= Elmbridge railway station =

Former railway station in England

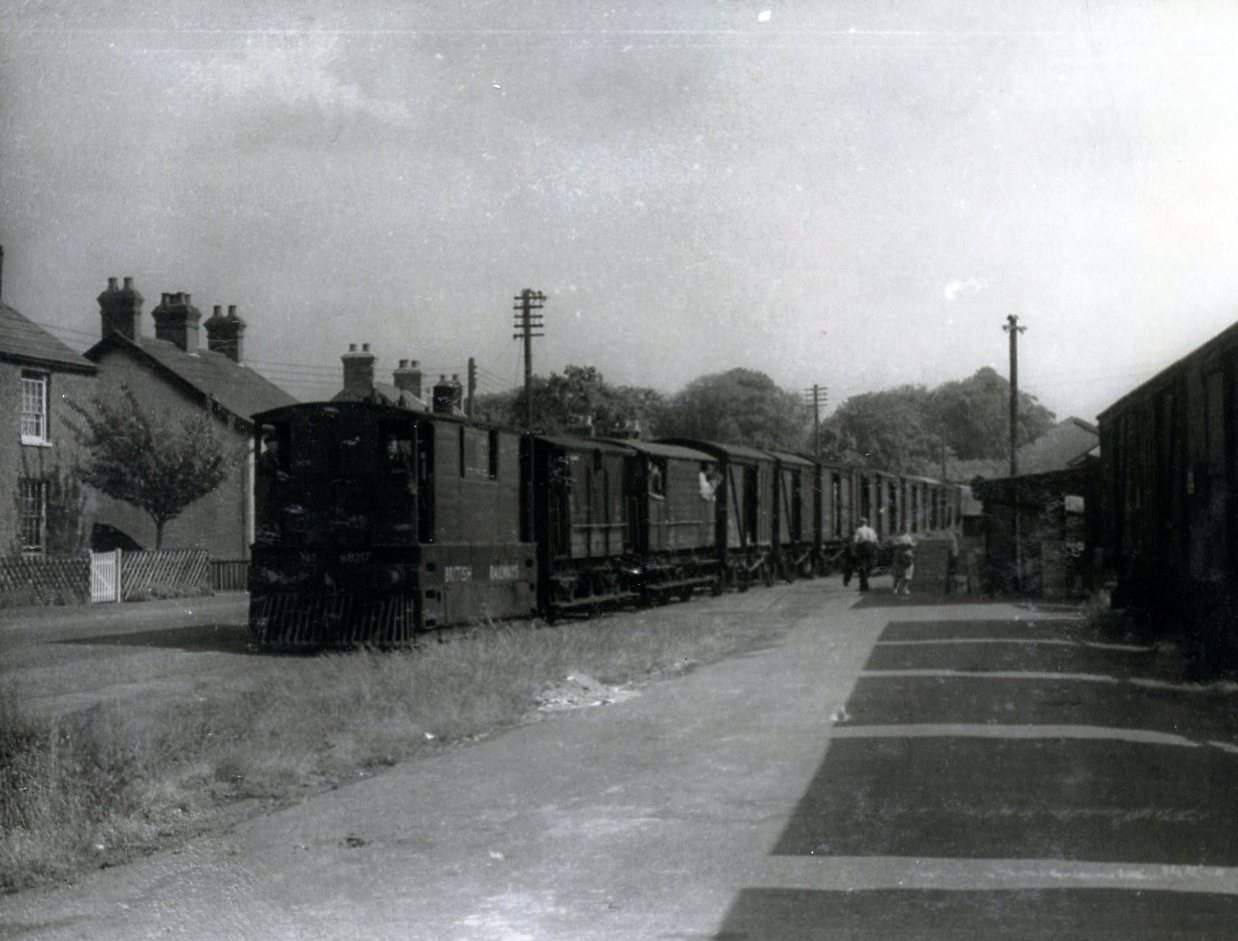
- A goods train loading fruit in 1950

General information
- Location: Emneth; United Kingdom
- Coordinates: 52.6451°N 0.1836°E
- Line: Wisbech and Upwell Tramway

History
- Opened: 20 August 1883
- Closed: 2 January 1928 (passengers), 1966 (freight)
- Pre-grouping: Great Eastern Railway
- Post-grouping: London and North Eastern Railway
Location

Elmbridge railway station was a stop on the Wisbech and Upwell Tramway. It was in a projection of the parish of Emneth, Norfolk but was immediately south-east of the town of Wisbech, Cambridgeshire. It was opened on 20 August 1883 to serve nearby settlements and closed to passengers on 2 January 1928. The tramway ceased by closing to goods in 1966.

Former Services

Preceding station	Disused railways	Following station
Wisbech	Wisbech & Upwell; Tramway	Boyces Bridge
