= Brymbo railway station (Great Central Railway) =

Disused railway station in Wales

Brymbo (WMCQR)
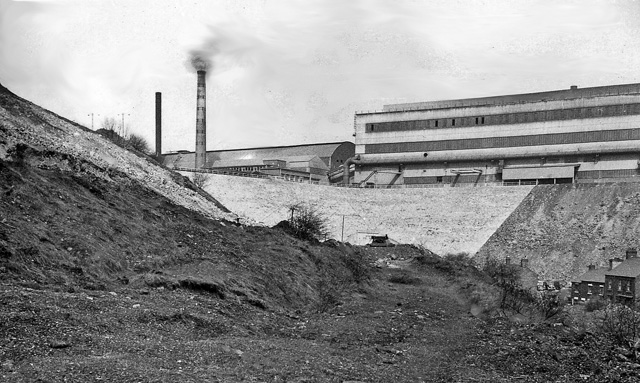
- The site of the station in 1962

General information
- Location: Brymbo, Wrexham; Wales
- Coordinates: 53.0733°N 3.0505°W
- Grid reference: SJ296535

Other information
- Status: Disused

History
- Original company: Wrexham, Mold and Connah's Quay Railway
- Pre-grouping: Great Central Railway

Key dates
- 1 August 1889: Opened
- 1 March 1917: Closed to passengers
- April 1956: Closed
Location

Brymbo (WMCQR) railway station was a station in Brymbo, Wrexham, Wales. The station was opened on 1 August 1889, closed to passengers on 1 March 1917 and closed completely in April 1956.

== History ==
Brymbo was an industrial centre for the metal industry by the time the WMCQR had opened. The town was surrounded by multiple coal mines. The original purpose of the branch was to carry goods more than passengers, and even the WMCQR had built the line to serve local industries as its purpose. On 1 January 1923 the station became a part of the London and North Eastern Railway. During World War II a German bomb landed on the station. On 1 January 1948 the station at Brymbo became a part of the British Railways (Western Region). From 19 June 1958 the British Railways stopped using the line to access the steelworks. The final section of the line closed on 5 October 1970. The site was lost under spoil from the Brymbo Steelworks.

Preceding station	Disused railways	Following station
Terminus	Great Central Railway; Wrexham, Mold and Connah's Quay Railway	Plas Power (WMCQR); Line and station closed
