= Newstead railway station (Scotland) =

Disused railway station in Newstead, Scottish Borders

Newstead

General information
- Location: Newstead, Melrose; Scotland
- Coordinates: 55.5988°N 2.6918°W
- Grid reference: NT565361
- Platforms: 2

Other information
- Status: Disused

History
- Original company: North British Railway

Key dates
- November 1849: Opened
- October 1852: Closed to passengers
- 1859: Closed completely
Location

Newstead railway station or Bradshaw railway station, as it was referred to in early editions of the timetable, served the village of Newstead, Melrose, Scotland, from 1849 to 1859 on the Waverley Route.

== History ==
The station opened in November 1849 by the North British Railway. The exact location of the station is not confirmed, but it was believed to have been at either side of Haseldean Lane. It originally appeared as 'Newbridge' in the Bradshaw timetable. The nearby goods yard may have been adjacent to the site of the station, but there is little information. The station disappeared from the timetable in October 1852. It was presumed to have closed to passengers and it closed completely in 1859 or after.

Preceding station	Disused railways	Following station
Melrose; Line and station closed	North British Railway; Waverley Route	St Boswells; Line and station closed
