= Melrose railway station =

Disused railway station in Melrose, Roxburghshire

Melrose
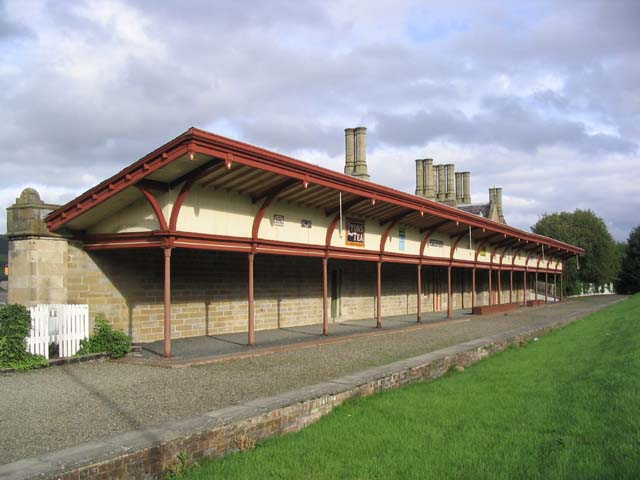
- Remains of the up platform

General information
- Location: Melrose, Roxburghshire; Scotland
- Coordinates: 55.5966°N 2.7211°W
- Grid reference: NT546339
- Platforms: 2

Other information
- Status: Disused

History
- Original company: North British Railway
- Pre-grouping: North British Railway
- Post-grouping: LNER British Rail (Scottish Region)

Key dates
- 20 February 1849: Opened
- 6 January 1969: Closed
Location

Melrose railway station served the town of Melrose, Roxburghshire, Scotland from 1849 to 1969 on the Waverley Route.

== History ==
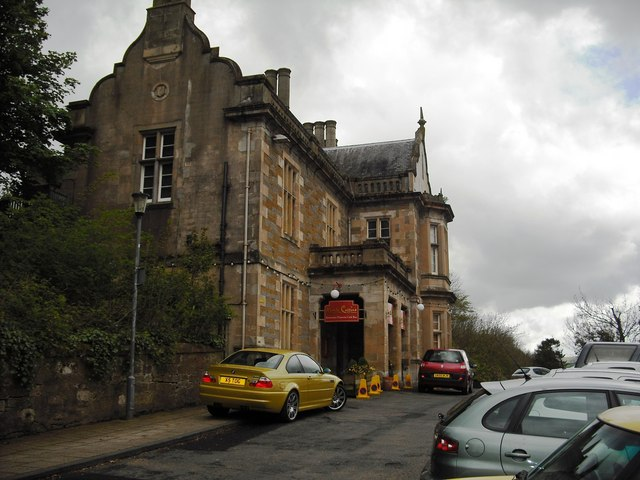
Entrance to the former station building

The station opened on 20 February 1849 by the North British Railway. The station was situated parallel with the road of the A6091 and the forecourt was at the end of Palma Place.

The small goods yard was on the down side behind the platform and could only be accessed from the west; it consisted of three sidings. The siding to the north had a loop and passed through a cast-iron framed wooden goods shed. Before the turn of the 20th century, the goods yard had been re-laid with two parallel sidings, one passing through the goods shed.

The station was closed to goods traffic on 18 May 1964 but passenger service continued until the closure of the line on 6 January 1969.

== Site today ==
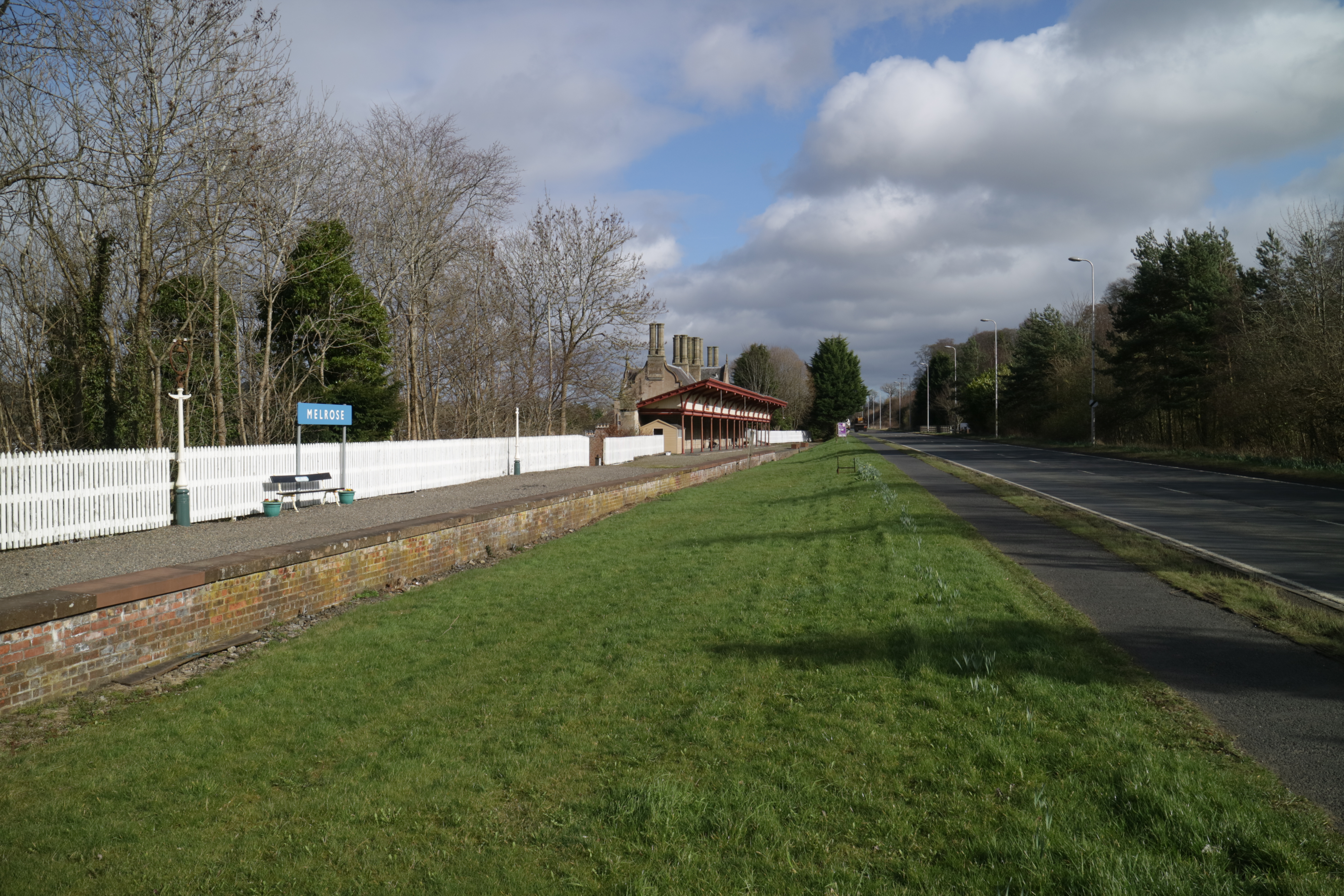
Remains of the up platform and the A6091 which occupies the former down platform

The down platform was demolished to make way for the A6091 Melrose bypass road. However the main station building, now a restaurant, and the adjacent up platform including the canopy and the original running in board, have been preserved.

Preceding station	Disused railways	Following station
Galashiels; Line closed, station open	North British Railway; Waverley Route	Newstead; Line and station closed
