= Southend railway station (Mumbles) =

Disused railway station in Mumbles, Swansea

Southend

General information
- Location: Mumbles, Glamorgan; Wales
- Coordinates: 51.5717°N 3.9889°W
- Grid reference: SS622877
- Platforms: 1

Other information
- Status: Disused

History
- Original company: Oystermouth Railway
- Pre-grouping: Swansea and Mumbles Railway; Swansea Improvements and Tramway Company
- Post-grouping: Swansea Improvements and Tramway Company

Key dates
- 25 March 1807: Opened
- 1827: Closed
- 6 May 1893: Reopened
- 10 May 1898: Resited
- 6 January 1960: Closed
Location

Southend railway station served the area of Mumbles, in the historical county of Glamorgan, Wales, from 1807 to 1960 on the Swansea and Mumbles Railway.

== History ==
The station was opened on 25 March 1807 by the Oystermouth Railway. It was a request stop. Like the rest of the stations on the line, the first services were horse-drawn. It closed in 1827 but it reopened on 6 May 1893. It was known as Mumbles (Southend) but it was later changed to Southend when the line was extended to Mumbles Pier on 10 May 1898. It was also resited around this time. The station closed along with the line on 6 January 1960.

Preceding station	Disused railways	Following station
Oystermouth; Line and station closed	Swansea and Mumbles Railway	Mumbles Pier; Line and station closed
