= New Broughton Road Halt railway station =

Former railway station in Wrexham, Wales

New Broughton Road Halt

General information
- Location: New Broughton, Wrexham; Wales
- Coordinates: 53.0572°N 3.0304°W
- Grid reference: SJ310515
- Platforms: 1

Other information
- Status: Disused

History
- Original company: Great Central Railway
- Pre-grouping: Great Central Railway

Key dates
- May 1905: Opened
- 1 March 1917: Closed
Location

New Broughton Road Halt railway station was a station in New Broughton, Wrexham, Wales. The station was opened in May 1905 and closed on 1 March 1917.

Preceding station	Disused railways	Following station
Plas Power (WMCQR); Line and station closed	Great Central Railway; Wrexham, Mold and Connah's Quay Railway	Moss and Pentre; Line and station closed
