= Mumbles Pier railway station =

Disused railway station in Glamorgan, Wales

Mumbles Pier
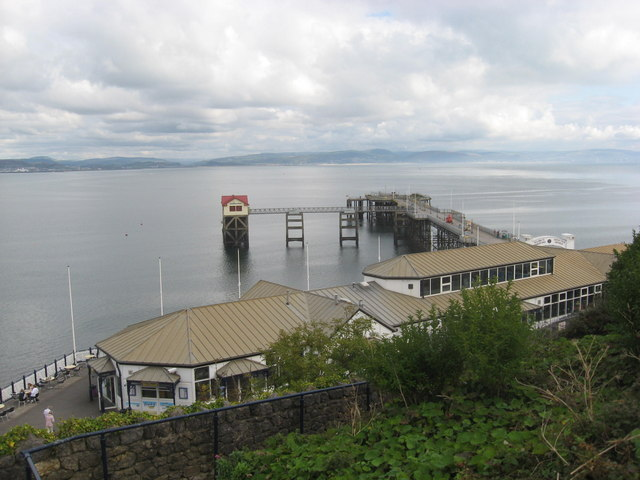
- The site of the station in 2009

General information
- Location: Mumbles, Glamorgan; Wales
- Coordinates: 51.5689°N 3.9787°W
- Grid reference: SS629874

Other information
- Status: Disused

History
- Original company: Swansea and Mumbles Railway

Key dates
- 10 May 1898: Opened
- 12 October 1959: Closed
Location

Mumbles Pier railway station served the community of Mumbles, in the historical county of Glamorgan, Wales, from 1898 to 1959 on the Swansea and Mumbles Railway.

== History ==
The station was opened on 10 May 1898 by the Swansea and Mumbles Railway. It closed on 12 October 1959.

Preceding station	Disused railways	Following station
Southend; Line and station closed	Swansea and Mumbles Railway	Terminus
