= Oakwellgate railway station =

Short-lived railway station in Gateshead, Tyne and Wear

Oakwellgate

General information
- Location: Gateshead, Tyne and Wear; England
- Coordinates: 54.9665°N 1.601°W
- Grid reference: NZ256636

Other information
- Status: Disused

History
- Original company: Brandling Junction Railway
- Pre-grouping: Brandling Junction Railway

Key dates
- 5 September 1839: Opened
- 2 September 1844: Closed
Location

Oakwellgate railway station served the town of Gateshead, Tyne and Wear, England, from 1839 to 1844 by the Brandling Junction Railway.

== History ==
The station was opened on 5 September 1839 by Brandling Junction Railway. It was a short-lived station, being open for less than five years before closing on 2 September 1844.

The former site is currently a car park for The Glasshouse.

Preceding station	Disused railways	Following station
Terminus	Brandling Junction Railway	High Shields; Line and station closed
