= Newmains railway station =

Disused railway station in Newmains, North Lanarkshire

Coordinates: 55.7850°N 3.8746°W

Newmains

General information
- Location: Newmains, North Lanarkshire; Scotland
- Platforms: 1

Other information
- Status: Disused

History
- Original company: Caledonian Railway
- Pre-grouping: Caledonian Railway
- Post-grouping: London, Midland and Scottish Railway

Key dates
- 15 May 1867: Opened
- 1 January 1917: Closed
- 2 June 1919: Reopened
- 1 December 1930: Closed permanently
Location

Newmains railway station served the village of Newmains, North Lanarkshire, Scotland from 1867 to 1930 on the Cleland to Morningside Line.

== History ==
The station was opened on 15 May 1867 by the Caledonian Railway. To the north were the goods yard and the signal box, which opened with the station in 1867, and to the south was Coltness Iron Works. The station closed on 1 January 1917, but reopened on 2 June 1919 before closing permanently on 1 December 1930.

Preceding station	Disused railways	Following station
Cleland (Old); Line and station closed	Caledonian Railway; Cleland to Morningside Line	Terminus
