= Oystermouth railway station =

Disused railway station in Oystermouth, Swansea

Oystermouth
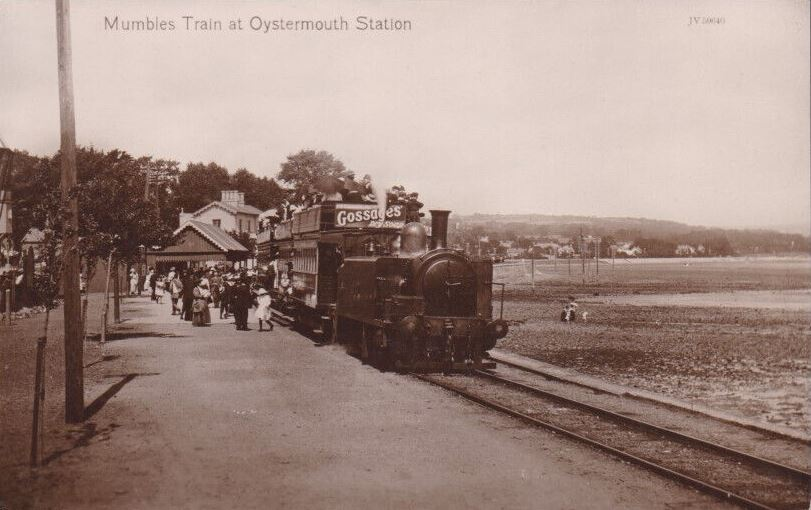

General information
- Location: Oystermouth, Glamorgan; Wales
- Coordinates: 51.5756°N 3.9986°W
- Grid reference: SS616882
- Platforms: 1

Other information
- Status: Disused

History
- Original company: Oystermouth Railway
- Pre-grouping: Swansea and Mumbles Railway; Swansea Improvements and Tramway Company
- Post-grouping: Swansea Improvements and Tramway Company

Key dates
- 25 March 1807: Opened
- 1827: Closed
- 11 November 1860: Reopened as Mumbles
- 6 May 1893: Resited
- 2 November 1893: Name changed to Oystermouth
- 6 January 1960: Closed
Location

Oystermouth railway station served the village of Oystermouth, in the historical county of Glamorgan, Wales, from 1807 to 1960 on the Swansea and Mumbles Railway.

== History ==
The station was opened on 25 March 1807 by the Oystermouth Railway. The first services were horse drawn. Due to an increase in road traffic competition, the fares were reduced in 1826. The station closed in 1827 after the horse drawn services ended. It reopened on 11 November 1860 as Mumbles. It was resited 50 yards to the south on 6 May 1893 but the old station continued to be used. The old site was known as Elms. This site closed after December 1895. The station's name was changed to Oystermouth on 2 November 1895. It closed along with the line on 6 January 1960. The ticket office is still in use as a café.

| Preceding station | Disused railways | Following station |
|---|---|---|
| Norton Road; Line and station closed | Swansea and Mumbles Railway | Southend (Mumbles); Line and station closed |
