= Motherwell Bridge railway station =

Disused railway station in Motherwell, North Lanarkshire

Motherwell Bridge

General information
- Location: Motherwell, Lanarkshire; Scotland
- Coordinates: 55.7899°N 3.9938°W
- Grid reference: NS750569

Other information
- Status: Disused

History
- Original company: Caledonian Railway
- Pre-grouping: Caledonian Railway

Key dates
- 4 February 1871: Opened
- 1 August 1885: Closed
Location

Motherwell Bridge railway station served the town of Motherwell, in the historical county of Lanarkshire, Scotland, from 1871 to 1885 on the Lesmahagow Railway.

== History ==
The station was opened on 4 February 1871 by the Caledonian Railway. It was situated to the south of the current Motherwell station. The station closed on 1 August 1885 and was replaced by Motherwell to the north.

Preceding station	Disused railways	Following station
Terminus	Caledonian Railway; Lesmahagow Railway	Ferniegair; Line and station closed
