= Newcastle (Shot Tower) railway station =

Short-lived railway station in Newcastle-upon-Tyne, Tyne and Wear

Newcastle (Shot Tower)

General information
- Location: Newcastle-upon-Tyne, Tyne and Wear; England
- Coordinates: 54.9633°N 1.6287°W
- Grid reference: NZ238632

Other information
- Status: Disused

History
- Original company: Newcastle & Carlisle Railway

Key dates
- 21 October 1839: Opened
- 1 March 1847: Closed
Location

Newcastle Shot Tower, also known as Newcastle railway station, served the city of Newcastle-upon-Tyne, Tyne and Wear, England from 1839 to 1847 on the Newcastle & Carlisle Railway.

== History ==
The station opened on 21 October 1839 by the Newcastle & Carlisle Railway. It was situated on Railway Street, near the junction at Tyneside Road. The first passenger train at this temporary terminus was on 21 May 1839, which was for a special trip and regular passenger services began exactly five months later. A landslide occurred a few days after the station opened but it reopened on 2 November 1839. It closed on the same day as the second Newcastle station was opened on 1 March 1847.

Preceding station	Disused railways	Following station
Terminus	Newcastle & Carlisle Railway	Blaydon; Line and station open
