= Nottage Halt railway station =

Former railway station in south Wales

Nottage Halt

General information
- Location: Nottage, Bridgend; Wales
- Coordinates: 51.4922°N 3.7014°W
- Platforms: 1

Other information
- Status: Disused

History
- Original company: Great Western Railway

Key dates
- c. 1900: Opened (unadvertised) as Porthcawl Golfers Halt
- 17 July 1924: Public opening as Nottage Halt
- 9 September 1963: Closed to passengers
Location

Nottage Halt railway station was a small halt on the Porthcawl branch line, serving the village of Nottage, near Porthcawl, in Bridgend County Borough, South Wales.

== History ==
It first opened around 1900 as an unadvertised halt named Porthcawl Golfers Platform (or "Golf Platform"). In 1924, it was made a public halt called Nottage Halt. It had a single platform constructed in brick. Unlike many unstaffed halts in South Wales, the shelter at Nottage was a comparatively smart and substantial structure, with a tiled roof and brick chimney. The station was popular throughout its existence and was often referred to as "Golf Station", as the Royal Porthcawl Golf Club is nearby.

Nottage Halt closed to passengers in 1963, along with the whole of the Porthcawl branch. The closure came despite the fact that passenger receipts remained profitable. The line through the station closed in 1965.

Preceding station	Disused railways	Following station
Pyle; Line and station open	Great Western Railway; Porthcawl branch	Porthcawl; Line and station closed

== The site today ==
The remains of the halt are still visible. The trackbed is now little more than a rough pathway.
