= Plas Power railway station (Wrexham, Mold and Connah's Quay Railway) =

Former railway station in Wales

Plas Power (WMCQR)

General information
- Location: Southsea, Wrexham; Wales
- Coordinates: 53.0584°N 3.0406°W
- Grid reference: SJ303517

Other information
- Status: Disused

History
- Original company: Wrexham, Mold and Connah's Quay Railway
- Pre-grouping: Great Central Railway

Key dates
- 1 August 1889: Opened
- 1 March 1917: Closed to passengers
- 2 April 1956: Closed
Location

Plas Power (WMCQR) railway station was a station in Southsea, Wrexham, Wales. The station was opened on 1 August 1889, closed to passengers on 1 March 1917 and closed completely on 2 April 1956.

Preceding station	Disused railways	Following station
Brymbo (WMCQR); Line and station closed	Great Central Railway; Wrexham, Mold and Connah's Quay Railway	New Broughton Road Halt; Line and station closed
