= Mochdre & Pabo railway station =

Former railway station in Conwy, Wales

Mochdre & Pabo

General information
- Location: Mochdre, Conwy County Borough (then Denbighshire); Wales
- Coordinates: 53.2920°N 3.7678°W
- Grid reference: SH823787
- Platforms: 2

Other information
- Status: Disused

History
- Original company: London and North Western Railway
- Pre-grouping: London and North Western Railway
- Post-grouping: London, Midland and Scottish Railway

Key dates
- 1 April 1889: Opened
- 1 January 1917: closed
- 5 May 1919: opened
- 5 January 1931: Closed
Location

Mochdre & Pabo railway station was located on the eastern edge of the village of Mochdre, Conwy County Borough (then Denbighshire), Wales.

== History ==
Opened 1 April 1889 by the London and North Western Railway, it was served by what is now the North Wales Coast Line between Chester, Cheshire and Holyhead, Anglesey. It was the location of experimental trackside water troughs, from which passing steam locomotives could scoop up fresh water supplies without having to stop. These devices became commonplace around the world, but Mochdre was the first place they were ever used, starting in 1860 before moving to Aber in 1871.

The station had two platforms made of wood upon which were only very basic waiting facilities and a signal box. As with many other lightly patronised stops of the time, it was closed during World War I for austerity purposes between 1 January 1917 and 5 May 1919. The station struggled on until it closed on 5 January 1931. The line continued to run through the station until 1983, when the railway route was realigned, and the station site covered by the A55.

Preceding station	Historical railways	Following station
Colwyn Bay; Line and station open	London and North Western Railway; North Wales Coast Line	Llandudno Junction; Line and station open
