= Rhosddu Halt railway station =

Former railway station in Wrexham, Wales

Rhosddu Halt

General information
- Location: Rhosddu, Wrexham; Wales
- Coordinates: 53.0618°N 3.0040°W
- Grid reference: SJ327521

Other information
- Status: Disused

History
- Original company: Great Central Railway
- Pre-grouping: Great Central Railway

Key dates
- July 1906: Opened
- 1 March 1917: Closed
Location

Rhosddu Halt railway station was a station in Rhosddu, Wrexham, Wales. The station was opened in July 1906 and closed on 1 March 1917. Used by workmen until about 1923.

Preceding station	Disused railways	Following station
Gwersyllt; Line and station open	Great Central Railway; Wrexham, Mold and Connah's Quay Railway	Wrexham General; Line and station open
