= Maesteg Castle Street railway station =

Disused railway station in Maesteg, Bridgend County Borough

Maesteg Castle Street
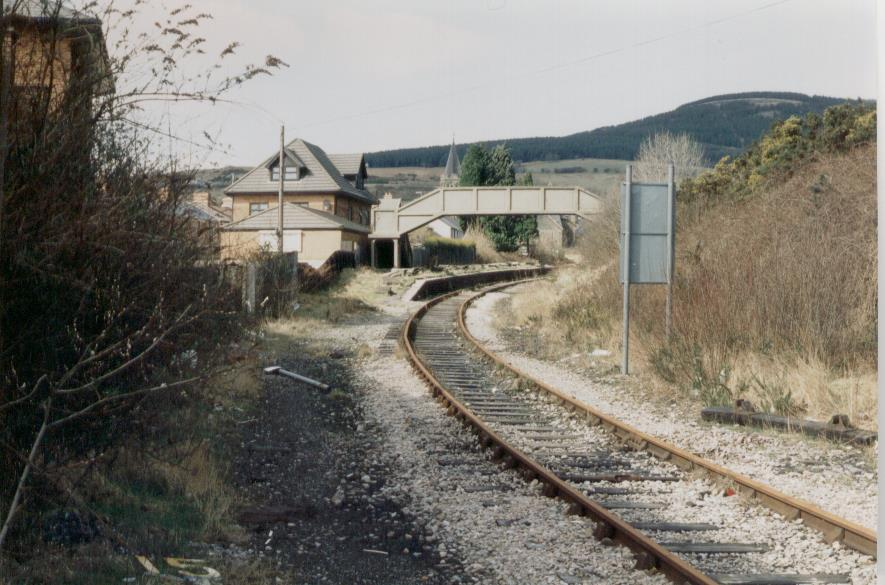
- The site of the station in 1994

General information
- Location: Maesteg, Bridgend County Borough; Wales
- Coordinates: 51.6103°N 3.6574°W
- Grid reference: SS853914
- Platforms: 2

Other information
- Status: Disused

History
- Original company: Great Western Railway

Key dates
- 25 February 1864: Opened as Maesteg
- 1 July 1924: Name changed to Maesteg Castle Street
- 22 June 1970: Closed
Location

Maesteg Castle Street railway station served the town of Maesteg, Glamorgan, Wales from 1864 to 1970 on the Llynvi and Ogmore Railway.

== History ==
The station opened as Maesteg on 25 February 1864 by the Great Western Railway. Its name was changed to Maesteg Castle Street on 1 July 1924. It closed to both passengers and goods traffic on 22 June 1970, having been listed for closure in Dr Beechings 1963,'The Reshaping of British Railways'. School services continued until 14 July 1970.

Preceding station	Disused railways	Following station
Troedyrhiew Garth; Line and station closed	Great Western Railway; Llynvi and Ogmore Railway	Nantyffyllon; Line closed, station open
