= Moss and Pentre railway station =

Closed railway station in Wrexham, Wales

Moss & Pentre
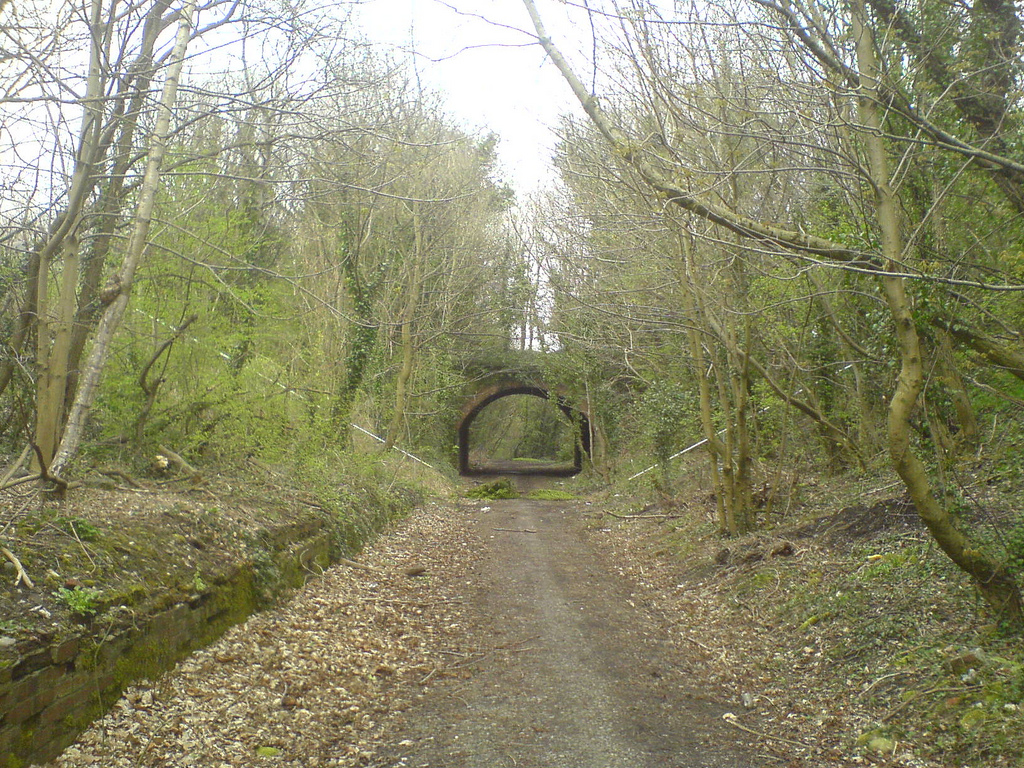
- The site of the station in 2008

General information
- Location: Brynteg, Wrexham County Borough; Wales
- Coordinates: 53.0604°N 3.0288°W
- Grid reference: SJ311519

Other information
- Status: Disused

History
- Original company: Wrexham, Mold and Connah's Quay Railway
- Pre-grouping: Great Central Railway

Key dates
- 1 August 1889: Opened
- 1 March 1917: Closed
Location

Moss & Pentre railway station was a station in Brynteg, Wrexham, Wales. The station was opened on 1 August 1889 and closed on 1 March 1917.

Preceding station	Disused railways	Following station
New Broughton Road Halt; Line and station closed	Great Central Railway; Wrexham, Mold and Connah's Quay Railway	Highfield Road Halt; Line and station closed
