= Nelson Glam railway station =

Disused railway station in Nelson, Caerphilly

Nelson Glam

General information
- Location: Nelson, Glamorganshire; Wales
- Coordinates: 51.6519°N 3.2836°W
- Grid reference: ST112955

Other information
- Status: Disused

History
- Original company: Taff Vale Railway
- Pre-grouping: Taff Vale Railway
- Post-grouping: Great Western Railway

Key dates
- 1 June 1900: Opened as Nelson
- 1 July 1924: Name changed to Nelson Glam
- 12 September 1932: Closed
Location

Nelson Glam railway station served the village of Nelson, in the historical county of Glamorganshire, Wales, from 1900 to 1932 on the Llancaiach Branch.

== History ==
The station was opened as Nelson on 1 June 1900 by the Taff Vale Railway. Its name was changed to Nelson Glam on 1 July 1924. It closed on 12 September 1932.

Preceding station	Disused railways	Following station
Terminus	Taff Vale Railway; Llancaiach Branch	Llanfabon Road Halt; Line and station closed
