= Newport Dock Street railway station =

Former railway station in Wales

Coordinates: 51°34′57″N 2°59′12″W

Newport Dock Street
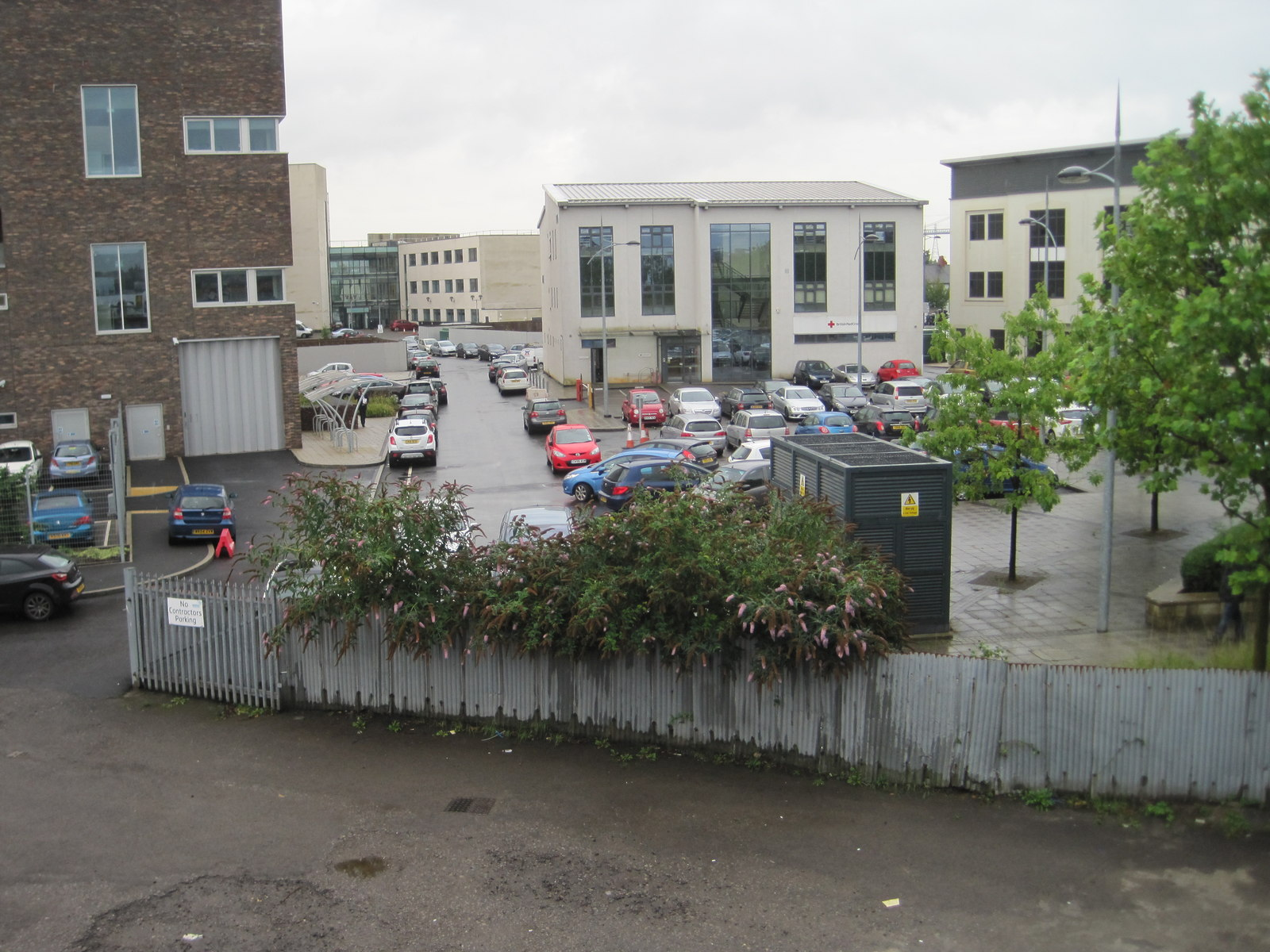
- The site of the station in 2015

General information
- Location: Newport, Newport; Wales
- Platforms: ?

Other information
- Status: Disused

History
- Original company: Monmouthshire Railway and Canal Company
- Pre-grouping: Great Western Railway
- Post-grouping: Great Western Railway

Key dates
- 4 August 1852: Opened
- 1 August 1880: Closed to passengers
- 1960s: Closed to goods
Location

Newport Dock Street railway station was one of three stations in central Newport, Monmouthshire.

== History ==
The station was opened on 4 August 1852 as the terminus of Monmouthshire Railway and Canal Company's Western Valleys line to Blaina and Ebbw Vale. The line itself had opened on 21 December 1850 with a temporary terminus at Courtybella.

By May 1855 the Western Valley line was connected to the Eastern Valley line at Mill Street station, although Dock Street station continued to act as a terminus.

By January 1879 a connection was made from Park Junction to Gaer Junction just west of the Hillfield Tunnels on the South Wales Main Line. On 12 May 1880, all Western Valley trains were diverted via this new chord to High Street station. London and North Western Railway services from the Sirhowy branch followed on 1 June 1880. The station then closed to passengers. The line between Dock Street and Pill Bank Junction remained open for goods traffic until 1991.

Preceding station	Disused railways	Following station
Bassaleg Junction; Line and station closed	Great Western Railway; Monmouthshire Railway and Canal Company	Terminus

== See also ==
- Railway stations in Newport
