= Newmarket High Level railway station =

Former railway station in Suffolk, England

The Newmarket High Level railway station was built by the Newmarket and Chesterford Railway on 4 April 1848 as a single platform terminus for the 15-mile (24 km) line from Great Chesterford. The line was extended by the Eastern Counties Railway eastwards to Bury St Edmunds on 1 April 1854, but trains had to reverse in or out of the station.

Sir Nikolaus Pevsner described the station thus: "was one of the most sumptuously Baroque stations of the early Victorian decades in England. Seven bays, one story divided by coupled Ionic giant columns carrying protected pieces of entablature and big chunks of decorated attic."

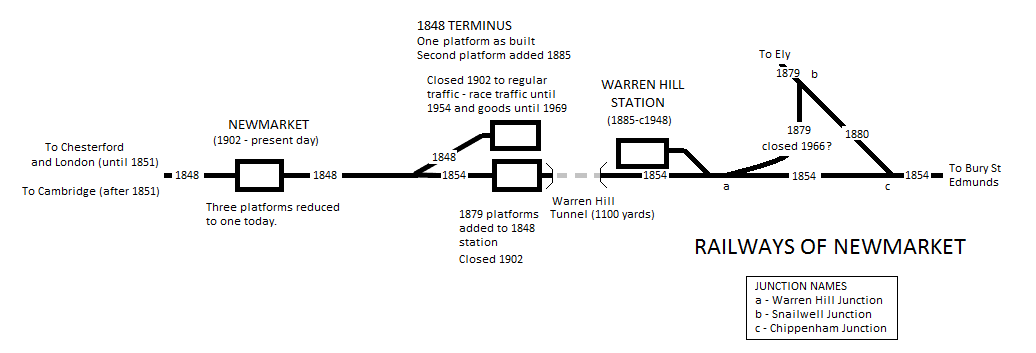
Railways in Newmarket

== History ==
The line between Cambridge and Newmarket was doubled in 1875.

An additional island platform was opened on 1 September 1879 for general traffic located on the direct Ipswich - Cambridge line. (Note: A number of sources incorrectly state this opened on 1854 when the line opened) This meant that through trains no longer had to reverse in and out of the original station and the original terminus station was then used for race day traffic and any Newmarket - Cambridge services. At the north end a footbridge linked the terminal platform and the new platforms (which were at a slightly lower level) and these remained open until replaced in 1902 by a new station to the south.

The former terminus became known as Newmarket (High Level). (Note: A number of sources identify the new platforms and the old terminus as a separate station. They in fact shared a refreshment room and were linked by a footbridge so have been treated as one entity.)

The new platforms were located just south of the 1,100 yard Warren Hill tunnel (52.2432°N 0.4154°E) and lasted until 1902 when the new station opened (see below).

The island platform survived disused for a number of years and pictorial evidence from the 1900s shows the surface was partly broken up and flowerbeds created. The platform was removed sometime in the 1930s to enable the main line to be re-aligned so more siding space could be created at the old terminus site.

An additional platform at the terminus station (known as the third class platform) was opened in 1885 to cope with additional raceday traffic. Opening the same year as Newmarket Warren Hill station the old station site dealt with race traffic from the south and London whilst Warren Hill dealt with traffic from the north and east.

During World War I the terminus station building was used as a temporary hospital.

Race day traffic ceased using the terminus platforms in July 1954.

Goods traffic at the old terminus station remained vibrant until the 1960s. Records from 1960 show that, caravans (the Sprite model produced by Newmarket firm Caravans International), agricultural implements, fertilizers and barley left the station and much paper imported from the USA was received. Horse traffic amounted to 1,073 sent and 1.573 received.

On 21 February 1967 the last shunting horse to work on British Rail, "Charlie" at Newmarket retired with goods traffic being withdrawn from Newmarket the same year.

The track was lifted in February 1969. The main station building received grade 2 listing but fell into a state of disrepair. It and the remaining buildings on the site were demolished in 1980 and the site is now occupied by a housing estate.

== Engine shed ==
A turntable was provided at Newmarket for turning locomotives and in the early 1880s the GER provided a timber engine shed and inspection pit at this location. The LNER installed a 60-foot turntable in the 1920s primarily for visiting locomotives on race day traffic rather than Newmarket's allocated shunting locomotive. The dilapidated shed was demolished during the 1930s although the inspection pit, turntable and water tower remained until closure.

The stables housing the shunting horses were located close to the water tower.

== See also ==
- Newmarket Warren Hill station
- Newmarket railway station (Suffolk)
