= Newmarket Warren Hill railway station =

Railway station in Suffolk, England

Newmarket Warren Hill station (52.2524°N 0.4187°E) was built by the Great Eastern Railway. It opened on 4 April 1885 just to the north of Warren Hill Tunnel and catered for racecourse-goers arriving from points north, particularly Lincoln, Leeds and Manchester, with the encouragement of the Jockey Club. Warren Hill was closed by the London and North Eastern Railway some time in or after 1945 but before 1 January 1948, when British Railways was formed.

== Description ==
Warren Hill station was a terminus station built alongside the Ipswich to Cambridge line but not served by it. The station consisted of a single island platform with two platform roads and a number of sidings and loops (for locomotives to run round their carriages).

Entrance to the station was by a four way covered staircase leading down to a covered (in glass and corrugated iron) arcade area. The arcade area, whilst not luxuriously equipped, had a refreshment bar, Ladies waiting room and toilets as well as various railway offices. The platform was 510 feet (160 m) long but had no shelter (presumably passengers waited in the covered area until their train was shunted into the platform).

== History ==
During the 1870s and 1880s more and more people were coming to the races at Newmarket. The opening of the Newmarket - Ely line in 1879 meant that trains from the north could get to Newmarket more easily rather than having to reverse at Cambridge and line of the first trains to use the new link was a train carrying racehorses from Newmarket to Doncaster.

In April 1883 the GER approved a quote (by builders Messrs Bennett Bros. of Downham Market) and work commenced on clearing a space north of the Ipswich to Cambridge line at the east end of Warren Hill tunnel. Although the building was delayed by inclement weather the station was ready for the 1885 "Craven" meeting at Newmarket Racecourse on 20 April. After this point, the old 1848 station dealt with traffic from London and the west whilst Warren Hill accommodated traffic from the north and east.

Warren Hill remained busy with racing traffic up to World War I where it was put into military use.

After the war racing day traffic returned to the station.

Following the Railways Act 1921 Warren Hill station was operated by the London and North Eastern Railway from 1 January 1923.

During the 1930s numbers using the station declined and the last train ran in October 1938.

Between 1939 and 1945 the station again saw military use and then after the war at some point between 1945 and 1948 the station was formally closed to passengers although saw goods and engineering traffic for a number of years. The sidings at Warren Hill were removed in the early 1960s although the platform remained until the 1980s.

== See also ==
- Newmarket High Level railway station
- Newmarket railway station (Suffolk)
