= Wisbech and Upwell Tramway =

Standard gauge tramway in East Anglia, England

Coordinates: 52.6451°N 0.18355°E

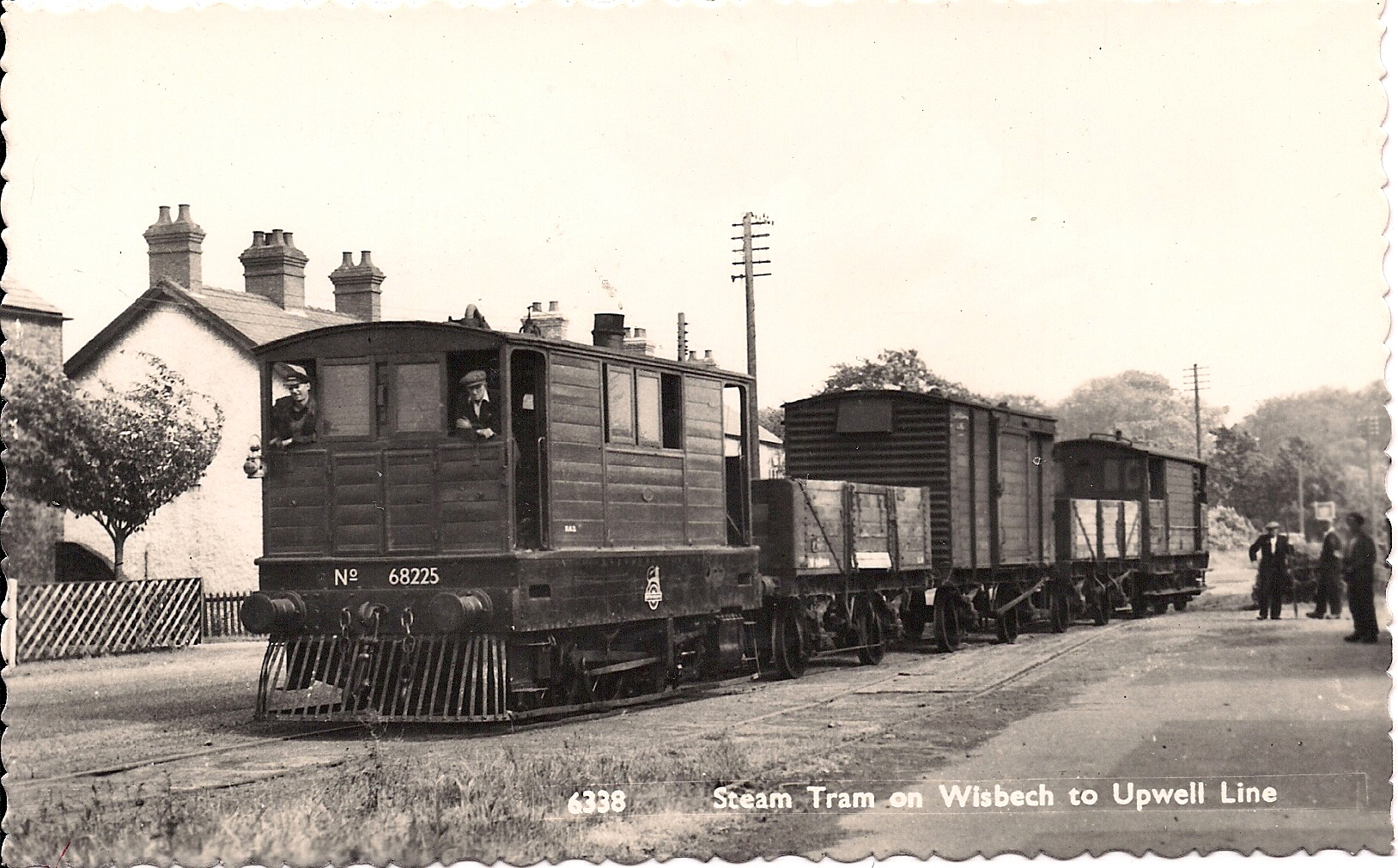
- A train on the Wisbech and Upwell Tramway, pulled by steam tram locomotive 68225, running without sideplates.

Operation
- Locale: Wisbech, Cambridgeshire; Upwell, Norfolk, England
- Open: 20 August 1883
- Close: 31 December 1927 (passengers), 23 May 1966 (freight)
- Status: Closed

Infrastructure
- Track gauge: 1,435 mm (4 ft 8 1/2 in)
- Propulsion systems: Steam and diesel

The Wisbech and Upwell Tramway was a rural standard gauge tramway in East Anglia. It was built by the Great Eastern Railway between Wisbech, Isle of Ely, Cambridgeshire, and Upwell, now in Norfolk, to carry agricultural produce. Although called a tramway, in many ways it more closely resembled a conventional railway line and paved the way for the passing of the Light Railways Act 1896.

== History ==
The Great Eastern Railway (GER) promoted the idea of a tramway between Wisbech and Upwell, and permission to construct the line was obtained by W. L. Ollard in 1873, but he failed to raise the finance to build it. The GER were still in favour of the line, and authorisation to construct it was enshrined in the Great Eastern Railway Act 1881. In addition to carrying passengers it was intended as a freight line, and to this end it was built to standard gauge, with bull-head rails, rather than the tramway rails favoured by many British tramways. This allowed standard goods wagons to run along it, without the need to tranship goods into wagons suitable for operating on tramway rails. In order to reduce the costs of construction, it was built under the provisions of the Tramways Act 1870 (33 & 34 Vict. c. 78), with the support of the Board of Trade, to demonstrate that such construction could bring railways to rural areas which could not otherwise benefit from the new mode of transport. The process of buying land began in February 1882, and building the tramway across the flat terrain proceeded rapidly. The section from Wisbech to Outwell Basin was opened on 20 August 1883, with the extension onwards from Outwell to Upwell Depot opening on 8 September 1884. The initial success of the line was one of the factors that resulted in the passing of the Light Railways Act 1896, under which many more rural lines were built.

Rolling stock consisted initially of four coaches originally built for the Millwall Extension Railway, two dating from 1871 and two from 1872. These were supplemented by four more coaches built by the Great Eastern Railway in 1884. They had lower floors, and were of two types; coaches 5 and 6 had four wheels, while coaches 7 and 8 were bogie vehicles, and were considerably longer. All four vehicles had ornate end balconies. The company also built a new baggage van at the same time, and allocated a brake van built in 1875 to the tramway. Motive power was provided by GER Class G15 0-4-0T tram engines, three of which were built in 1883 for the opening of the line; a further seven were built between 1885 and 1897, some for the Wisbech and Upwell Tramway and others for the Yarmouth Union tramway and freight-only lines at Colchester and Ipswich. Those used on the tramway were stabled at March Depot. The first four coaches were scrapped in 1890, when they were replaced by four new four-wheeled vehicles, which were again numbered 1 to 4. Between 1903 and 1921, the Great Eastern Railway built a fleet of twelve GER Class C53 0-6-0T tram engines, up to five of which were based at Wisbech – the others worked at Yarmouth, Colchester and Ipswich. In accordance with Board of Trade regulations, the tram engines were fitted with sideplates and cowcatchers.

When the line opened, passenger services were provided by six trams a day in each direction, with the journey taking one hour in either direction. By October 1884 the tramway was carrying 3,000 passengers per week, while for fetes and other special events as many as 2,000 passengers a day were carried. The tram competed with the Wisbech Canal that also ran between Wisbech and Upwell. The canal was struggling financially when the tramway opened, and although there was some transfer of coal between the railway and canal at Outwell, the tramway gradually took its trade, and it closed in 1922. Trains on the tramway were limited to 8 mph (13 km/h), and passengers could be picked up or dropped off at any point on the line. Most trains were mixed, with the passengers often having to wait while goods wagons were shunted. From 1904, the speed limit was increased to 12 mph (19 km/h), and the trains only stopped at designated places, although this included a number of request stops, as well as the formal stations.

Under the terms of the Railways Act 1921, the Great Eastern Railway amalgamated with other railways to create the London and North Eastern Railway at the start of 1923. By that time the tramway was facing increased competition from motorised buses, and the passenger service ended in 1927. Carriages 2 to 4 and 6 to 8 were transferred to the Kelvedon and Tollesbury Light Railway in Essex. Coach 8 appeared in the 1953 film The Titfield Thunderbolt after passenger services were withdrawn on the Kelvedon line in 1951, and was scheduled for preservation, but was subsequently scrapped. Coach 7 spent many years in a field, being used as an onion store, but was rescued and restored. It now resides on the North Norfolk Railway.

Freight traffic continued on the tramway until 1966. For a brief period in 1930-1931 the steam tram engines were supplemented by two LNER Class Y10 Sentinel geared steam locomotives, prior to them moving to the Yarmouth Quay line. From 1952, the line was worked by modified Drewry 0-6-0DM (Class 04) diesel shunters, again fitted with sideplates. It thus became the first line in Britain to be wholly worked by diesel locomotives. The line did not survive the Beeching cuts of the 1960s, and was officially closed on 23 May 1966, although the last train, consisting of Drewry Shunter D2201, three wagons and a brake van ran on 20 May.

== Route ==
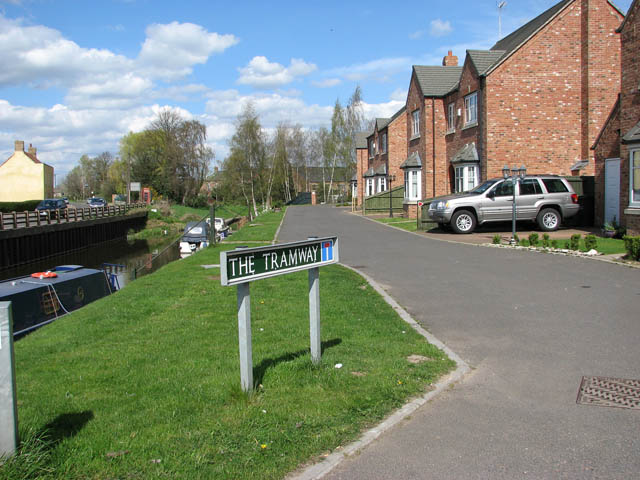
Street name The Tramway

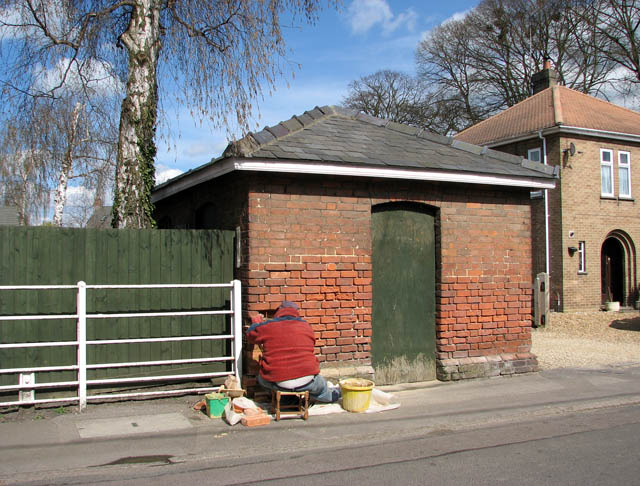
The former office of the Outwell Village depot

Opened in 1883, the Wisbech and Upwell Tramway ran from the Isle of Ely town of Wisbech to the Cambridgeshire (since 1974 Norfolk) village of Upwell. Its route carried it close to farms and villages, allowing goods to be shipped into Wisbech where they could be transferred onto the main line and carried to destinations further afield. It was this agricultural trade that caused the line to be constructed in the first place, and which kept it afloat after passenger services ceased in 1927.

Its Upwell depot was 5 miles 72 chains (5.9 mi; 9.5 km) distant from Wisbech. The line had eleven sidings, with two originally allocated for passenger traffic. During the fruit season the sidings could hold more than a hundred vans. The depot had a cattle dock, a depot office, a passenger waiting room, and a coal merchant's office and staithes. There was also an ash pit, and an old GER tender was used in place of a water tower until 1953 when it was removed.

From the Upwell depot, which was the southern terminus of the tramway, the trains headed northwards to the village of Outwell, crossing Small Lode and passing a farm before emerging on Low Side which was the final request stop. A farm driveway now runs where the railway trackbed used to be.

Running parallel with Well Creek (the old course of the River Nene) the tramway then ran along the grassy verge beside the creek before reaching the final section of reserved track at Goodman's Crossing request stop.

Outwell Village depot was located by the old course of the River Nene and adjoined by St Clement's church on the other side. It originally had four sidings and was equipped with coal chutes to transfer coal to barges for distribution through the Fens. The depot had a small office building built from red brick and an old van body for storage. The brick office still stands, but most of the depot site has since been built over by modern housing. The name of the cul-de-sac/access road is "The Tramway".

Motorists passing through Wisbech along Elm High Road near to the fire station may notice a small stretch of grass and trees, which marks the course of the Wisbech Canal, which ran between the River Nene at Wisbech and Outwell Creek on the Middle Level Navigations. The canal succumbed to competition from the tram, though Outwell and Upwell still have some of their canals left.

== Accidents ==
Despite the line's rural nature and the relatively low speed of its trams, there were frequent accidents, a number fatal, and it was noted that horses were often terrified of the tram. Numerous deaths involved people attempting to get on or off the tram while it was moving. In 1897 the coroner, at the inquest into the death of a seven-year-old boy called Harold Atkin, commented that Wisbech and Upwell boys frequently endeavoured to get on the carriages while they were in motion for the purpose of having a free ride, and that the company should consider stringent steps to stop the practice. Another boy, Leonard Francis Watson aged 15, was killed a few months later whilst boarding a tram.

== In fiction ==
For about 12 years, the Rev. W. Awdry was the vicar of Emneth, a village near Wisbech, and he drew much inspiration from the tramway for stories in his Railway Series children's books. In the book, Toby the Tram Engine, the character Toby, and his coach Henrietta are introduced, and Mavis the Quarry Diesel is introduced in Tramway Engines. She, Toby, and Henrietta are all based on the type of stock used on the tramway. Toby subsequently appeared in many more of the books and also became one of the main characters in the spin-off television series Thomas the Tank Engine and Friends.

== Bibliography ==
- Allen, D.W.; Boddy, M.G.; Brown, W.A.; Fry, E.V.; Hennigan, W.; Manners, F.; Neve, E.; Proud, P.; Roundthwaite, T.E.; Tee, D.F.; Yeadon, W.B. (November 1970). Fry, E.V. (ed.). Locomotives of the L.N.E.R., part 8A: Tank Engines - Classes J50 to J70. Kenilworth: RCTS. ISBN 978-0-901115-05-8.
- Boddy, M.G.; Brown, W.A.; Fry, E.V.; Hennigan, W.; Hoole, Ken; Manners, F.; Neve, E.; Platt, E.N.T.; Proud, P.; Yeadon, W.B. (June 1977). Fry, E.V. (ed.). Locomotives of the L.N.E.R., part 9B: Tank Engines - Classes Q1 to Z5. Kenilworth: RCTS. ISBN 978-0-901115-41-6.
- Paye, Peter (2009). Wisbech and Upwell Tramway. Oakwood Library of Railway History (1st ed.). The Oakwood Press. ISBN 978-0-85361-689-4.
