= Culross railway station =

Disused railway station in Culross, Fife

Culross
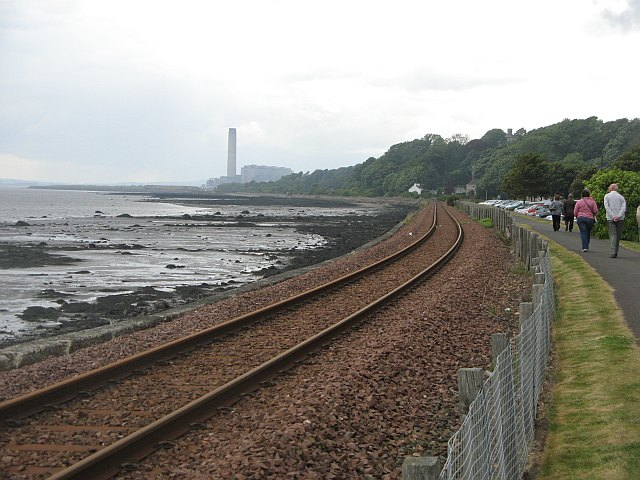
- The site of the station in 2009

General information
- Location: Culross, Fife; Scotland
- Coordinates: 56.0562°N 3.6176°W
- Grid reference: NS993860
- Platforms: 2

Other information
- Status: Disused

History
- Original company: North British Railway
- Post-grouping: LNER (1st station); ScotRail (2nd station)

Key dates
- 2 July 1906: Opened
- 7 July 1930: Closed
- 21 July 1992: Reopened
- 22 August 1992: Closed
Location

Culross railway station served the village of Culross, Fife, Scotland from 1906 to 1992 on the Kincardine Line.

== History ==
The station opened on 2 July 1906 by the North British Railway. To the northwest was the goods yard. The signal box closed in 1923 when the loop was lifted. The station closed on 7 July 1930 but the line remained open for goods with two power stations: Longannet power station and Kincardine power station. A second station opened on 21 July 1992 but was short lived because it was only used for workers at Longannet power station so it closed later in the year on 22 August.

Preceding station	Historical railways	Following station
Kincardine; Line open, station closed	Kincardine Line	Valleyfield; Line open, station closed
