= Alloa railway station (disambiguation) =

Alloa railway station may refer to:

Alloa railway station is a former North British Railway station, re-opened in 2008

- South Alloa railway station originally called Alloa, a closed former Caledonian Railway station
- Alloa Junction railway station
- Alloa Ferry railway station
- Alloa North railway station may refer to:
  - Alloa railway station was called Alloa North (sometimes North Alloa) from 1875 to 1882
  - Alloa Ferry railway station was also known as Alloa North railway station
