= Alloa Waggonway =

Former railway line in Scotland

The Alloa Waggonway, also known as the Alloa Railway, was an early tramway. It was 2 1/2 miles (4 km) miles long and connected coal pits above Alloa with the harbour and a bottle manufacturer at Alloa in Clackmannanshire, Scotland. The track was wooden with an iron running surface, and wagons were drawn by horses.

== History ==
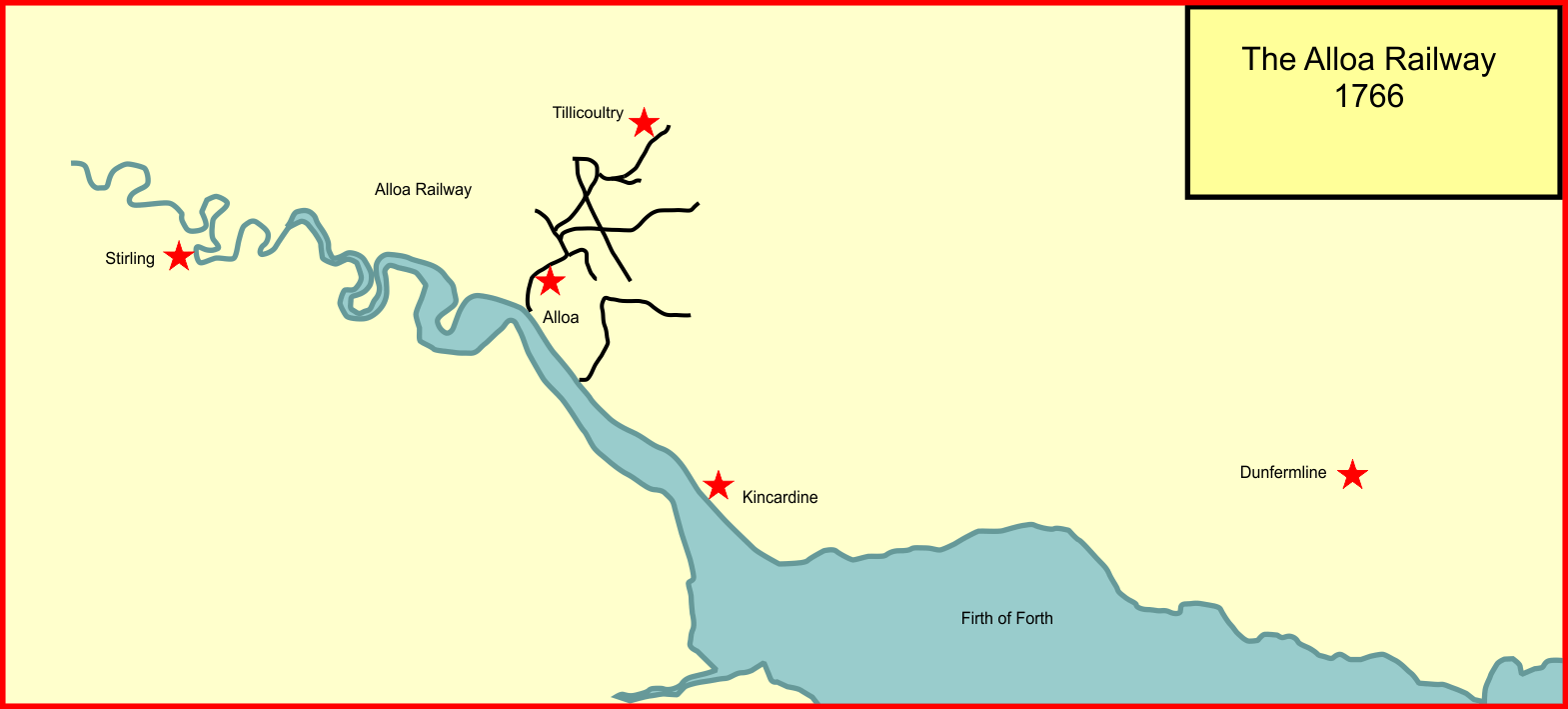
Alloa railway system, 1766

The Earls of Mar owned extensive lands in the hinterland of Alloa, and for some centuries coal had been produced from pits on the estate. Edinburgh was the biggest market for coal in the area, and it could easily be carried along the Forth by boat, but getting the mineral to the shore of the Forth was the problem.

John, 7th Earl of Mar opened a railway in about 1768 that ran from Alloa Harbour and up through Sauchie, serving the colliery there, to Devon Colliery north of Fishcross.

It was a close copy of the Tranent to Cockenzie Waggonway in gauge, wagon size and operating practices. At first it was a single line wooden wagonway; the track gauge was 3 feet 3 inches (99 cm) and the wagons were of 30 long hundredweight (1,500 kg) capacity, which was 5 times the capacity of the previous horse-drawn carts. There were several branches and the system became extensive, there were branches to Collyland (this branch required an inclined plane) and to Sherriffyards Colliery at Gartmorn Dam. By 1806 the system was extended to Tillicoultry, and an alternative route to the Forth at Kennetpans (Clackmannan) Pier was opened.

A useful contemporary commentary about the wagon way is provided by Sinclair (1793).

In 1768 a waggon way was made to the Alloa pits, which proved to be so great an advantage, that it induced the proprietor to extend it to the Collyland, in 1771. The sales were by these means increased, from 10,000 or 11,000 chalders to 15,000 or 16,000.

In 1785 the Alloa waggon way was worn out and required to be renewed. This was done on a new plan: and it is now acknowledged to be the most complete in Britain.... The sleepers are very broad, and only 18 inches from centre to centre. A rail of foreign fir, 4 inches square, is pinned down to them, and another rail, of the same dimensions, is laid over it, and the whole well beat up in good clay; on the top of the upper rail is laid a bar of malleable iron, of 1¾ inches breadth, and nearly six-8ths thick. The waggons have cast iron wheels, 27½ inches diameter, and are supposed to weigh altogether about a ton.

A waggon carries 30 cwt of coals and 3 waggons are linked together by chains; so that 1 horse draws 4½ tons of coal at once; and the declivity of the way is so gentle that the same horse draws with ease the 3 empty waggons back to the coal-hill. The advantage of putting the weight into 3 waggons, in place of 1, is very considerable: They are easier to fill and empty; and the throwing the weight over a greater surface, does less damage to the waggon way, and is likewise easier for the horse as it is well known, that almost the only stress a horse has, on a good waggon way, is in the first stating of the waggon; therefore if the whole 4½ tons were put into one waggon, the difficulty would be great; but as the waggons, when standing still, are close to one another, and the chains that link them together are 2 feet long, the horse has only 30cwt. of coals to put in motion; for, when he starts the first waggon, the impetus of it, if it does not actually move, at least greatly assists in moving the second and third.

The first expense of making this kind of waggon way, is undoubtedly great, being at least 10s. per running yard; yet the proprietor has been long ago reimbursed and is a considerable gainer; for although this road has been made these 6 years, it has required no repair worth mentioning, and it is now near as good as when first laid. (Note: 10s (£0 10s 0d) would be approximately £64 in 2019)

== Coal mining ==
Ultimately the waggon way linked the mines to each other, and provided connections to the standard gauge railways in Alloa, the Devon Valley, Tillicoultry as well as the harbour, Devon Iron Works and a bottle manufactory

The line was used to gather coal from pits in and near Sauchie for delivery to industry in Alloa and to the harbour for export. In 1879, 159,699 tons were shipped to foreign countries and 15,392 to UK ports.

== Closure ==
The Alloa Waggonway lost its importance with the opening of the Tillicoultry Branch of the Stirling & Dunfermline Railway in 1851 but continued for many years until closed in 1924.

== The line today ==
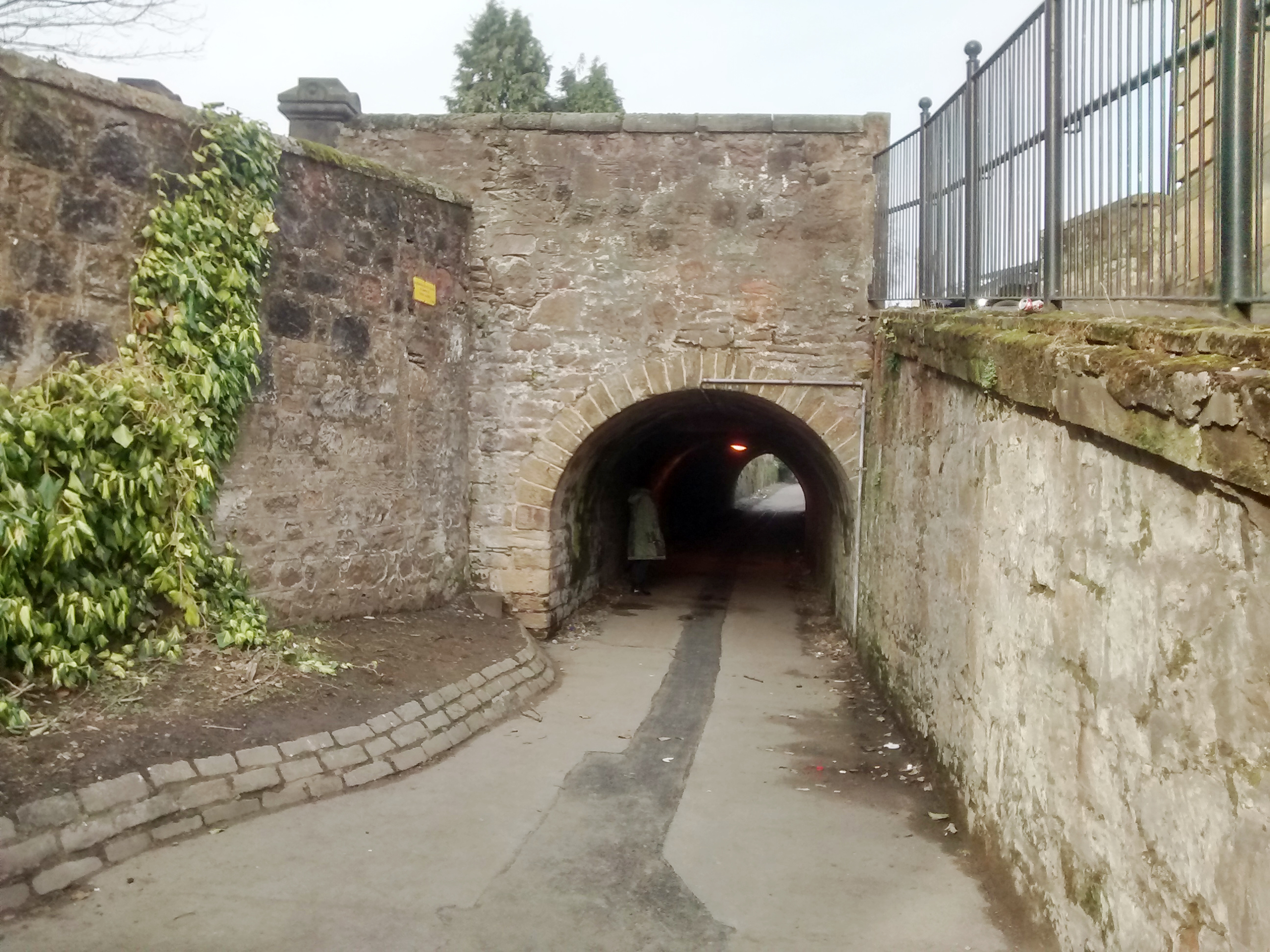
Alloa Waggonway and tunnel

Today the line has been converted into a cyclepath running from Castle Street, through the earliest railway tunnel in Scotland which passes under Bedford Place, to near Alloa railway station and along the north side of Gartmorn Dam.

== Bibliography ==
- Biddle, Gordon (2003). Britain's Historic Railway Buildings: An Oxford Gazetteer of Structures and Sites. Oxford: Oxford University Press. ISBN 9780198662471.
- Sinclair, Sir John (1793). The Statistical Account of Scotland 1791-1845. Vol. VIII. pp. 592–650.
- Thomas, John; Paterson, Rev A. J. S. (1984). A Regional History of the Railways of Great Britain. Vol. VI Scotland: The Lowlands and the Borders (2nd ed.). Newton Abbott, Devon: David & Charles. ISBN 0-9465-3712-7. OCLC 12521072.
- Thomas, John; Turnock, David (1989). A Regional History of the Railways of Great Britain. Vol. 15 The North of Scotland (1st ed.). Newton Abbott, Devon: David & Charles. ISBN 0-946537-03-8.
