= Cairneyhill railway station =

Disused railway station in Cairneyhill, Fife

Coordinates: 56.0584°N 3.5413°W

Cairneyhill
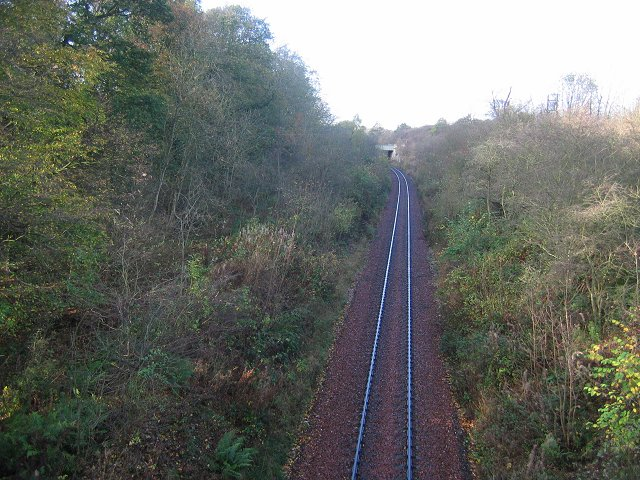
- The railway line near the former site in 2005

General information
- Location: Cairneyhill, Fife; Scotland
- Platforms: 1

Other information
- Status: Disused

History
- Original company: North British Railway
- Post-grouping: LNER

Key dates
- 2 July 1906: Opened
- 7 July 1930: Closed
Location

Cairneyhill railway station served the village of Cairneyhill, Fife, Scotland from 1906 to 1930 on the Kincardine Line.

== History ==
The station opened on 2 July 1906 by the North British Railway, although it was used earlier by students of Sabbath School on 26 May of the same year. It closed to passengers on 7 July 1930.

Preceding station	Historical railways	Following station
Torryburn; Line open, station closed	Kincardine Line	Dunfermline Town; Line and station open
