= East Grange (Fife) railway station =

Disused railway station in East Grange, Fife

Coordinates: 56.0847°N 3.6086°W

East Grange

General information
- Location: East Grange, Fife; Scotland
- Platforms: 2

Other information
- Status: Disused

History
- Original company: North British Railway
- Post-grouping: LNER; British Railways (Scottish Region)

Key dates
- 28 August 1850: Opened as Eastgrange, Culross and Torryburn
- 1878: Name changed to East Grange, Culross and Torryburn
- 1886: Name changed to East Grange for Culross
- 1909: Name changed to East Grange
- 15 September 1958: Closed
Location

East Grange railway station served the area of East Grange, Fife, Scotland, from 1850 to 1958 on the Stirling and Dunfermline Railway.

== History ==
The station opened as Eastgrange, Culross and Torryburn on 28 August 1850 by the North British Railway. To the west was the goods yard and to the north was the signal box, which was reduced to a ground frame in 1926. The station's name was changed to East Grange, Culross and Torryburn in 1878, changed to East Grange and Culross in 1886 and changed to East Grange in 1909. The station closed to passengers on 15 September 1958.

Preceding station	Disused railways	Following station
Bogside (Fife); Line and station closed	North British Railway; Stirling and Dunfermline Railway	Oakley (Fife); Line and station closed
