= Causewayhead (Stirling) railway station =

Disused railway station in Stirlingshire, Scotland

Coordinates: 56.1353°N 3.9263°W

Causewayhead Railway Station
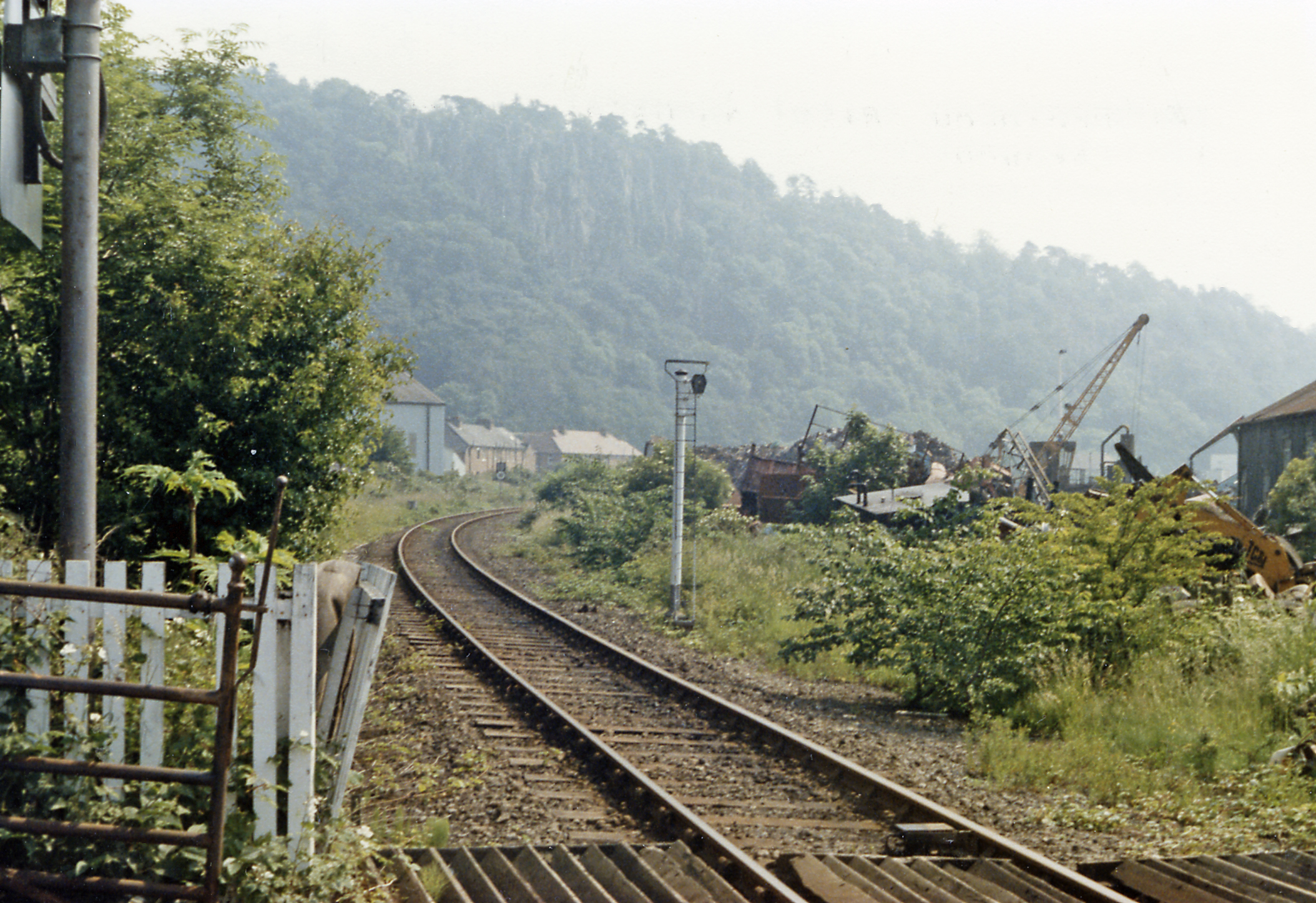
- The site of the station, looking northeast towards Alloa, in 1986

General information
- Location: Causewayhead, Stirlingshire; Scotland
- Platforms: 2

Other information
- Status: Disused

History
- Original company: Stirling and Dunfermline Railway
- Pre-grouping: North British Railway
- Post-grouping: LNER; British Railways (Scottish Region)

Key dates
- 1 July 1852: Opened
- 1 January 1917: Closed
- 1 February 1919: Reopened
- 4 July 1955: Closed
Location

Causewayhead railway station served the suburb of Causewayhead in Stirling, Scotland, from 1852 to 1955 on the Stirling and Dunfermline Railway.

== History ==
The station opened on 1 July 1852 by the Stirling and Dunfermline Railway. The goods yard was to the north west and the signal box, which opened in 1900, was on the westbound platform. The station closed on 1 January 1917 but reopened on 1 February 1919, only to close again on 4 July 1955. There is a proposal in consideration to reopen the station at a nearby site.

Preceding station	Historical railways	Following station
Stirling; Line open, station open	North British Railway; Stirling and Dunfermline Railway	Blackgrange; Line open, station closed
