= Oakley railway station =

Oakley railway station may refer to:

- Oakley railway station (Bedfordshire): operated by the Midland Railway in Bedford, England, and closed in 1958
- Oakley railway station (Hampshire): operated by the London and South Western Railway and closed in 1963
- Oakley (Fife) railway station: operated by the North British Railway and closed in 1968
- Oakley station (California): a planned Amtrak California station
