= Bogside (Fife) railway station =

Disused railway station in Bogside, Fife

Bogside (Fife)
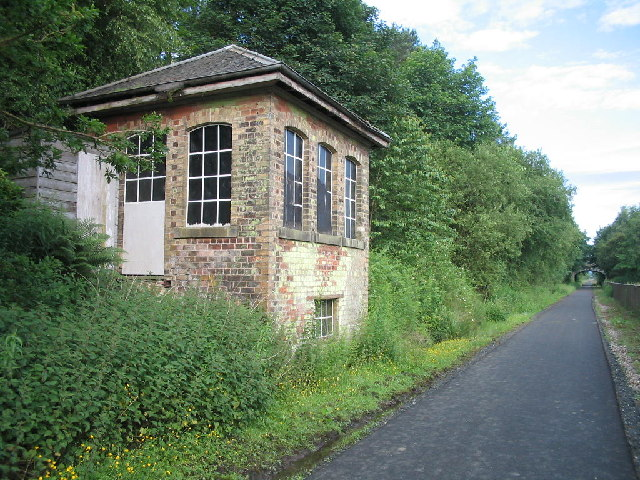
- The disused signal box in 2005

General information
- Location: Bogside, Fife; Scotland
- Coordinates: 56.0929°N 3.6534°W
- Grid reference: NS972901
- Platforms: 2

Other information
- Status: Disused

History
- Original company: North British Railway
- Pre-grouping: North British Railway
- Post-grouping: LNER; British Railways (Scottish Region)

Key dates
- 28 August 1850: Opened as Bogside
- 1933: Name changed to Bogside Fife
- 15 September 1958: Closed
Location

Bogside (Fife) railway station served the hamlet of Bogside, Fife, Scotland from 1850 to 1958 on the Stirling and Dunfermline Railway.

== History ==
The station opened as Bogside on 28 August 1850 by the North British Railway. To the north were gunpowder sidings that served Muirside Depot and to the east was a line that served Bogside Colliery. The station's name was changed to Bogside Fife in 1933 to avoid confusion with the one in North Ayrshire. The station closed to passengers on 15 September 1958. It remained open to goods traffic until 1979.

Preceding station	Disused railways	Following station
Forest Mill; Line and station closed	North British Railway; Stirling and Dunfermline Railway	East Grange (Fife); Line and station closed
