= Blackgrange railway station =

Disused railway station in Cambus, Clackmannanshire

Coordinates: 56.1321°N 3.8696°W

Blackgrange

General information
- Location: Cambus, Clackmannanshire; Scotland
- Platforms: 2

Other information
- Status: Disused

History
- Original company: North British Railway

Key dates
- November 1852: Opened
- November 1852: Closed
Location

Blackgrange railway station was a temporary station that served the village of Cambus, Clackmannanshire, Scotland, in 1852 on the Stirling and Dunfermline Railway.

== History ==
This was a short lived station built by North British Railway which was only open in November 1852.

A crossing keeper's house was located to the west of the crossing on the north side. A level crossing still exists on the line which was re-opened in 2008.

Preceding station	Historical railways	Following station
Causewayhead (Stirling); Line open, station closed	North British Railway; Stirling and Dunfermline Railway	Cambus; Line open, station closed
