= Forest Mill railway station =

Disused railway station in Scotland

Coordinates: 56.1111°N 3.7098°W

Forest Mill
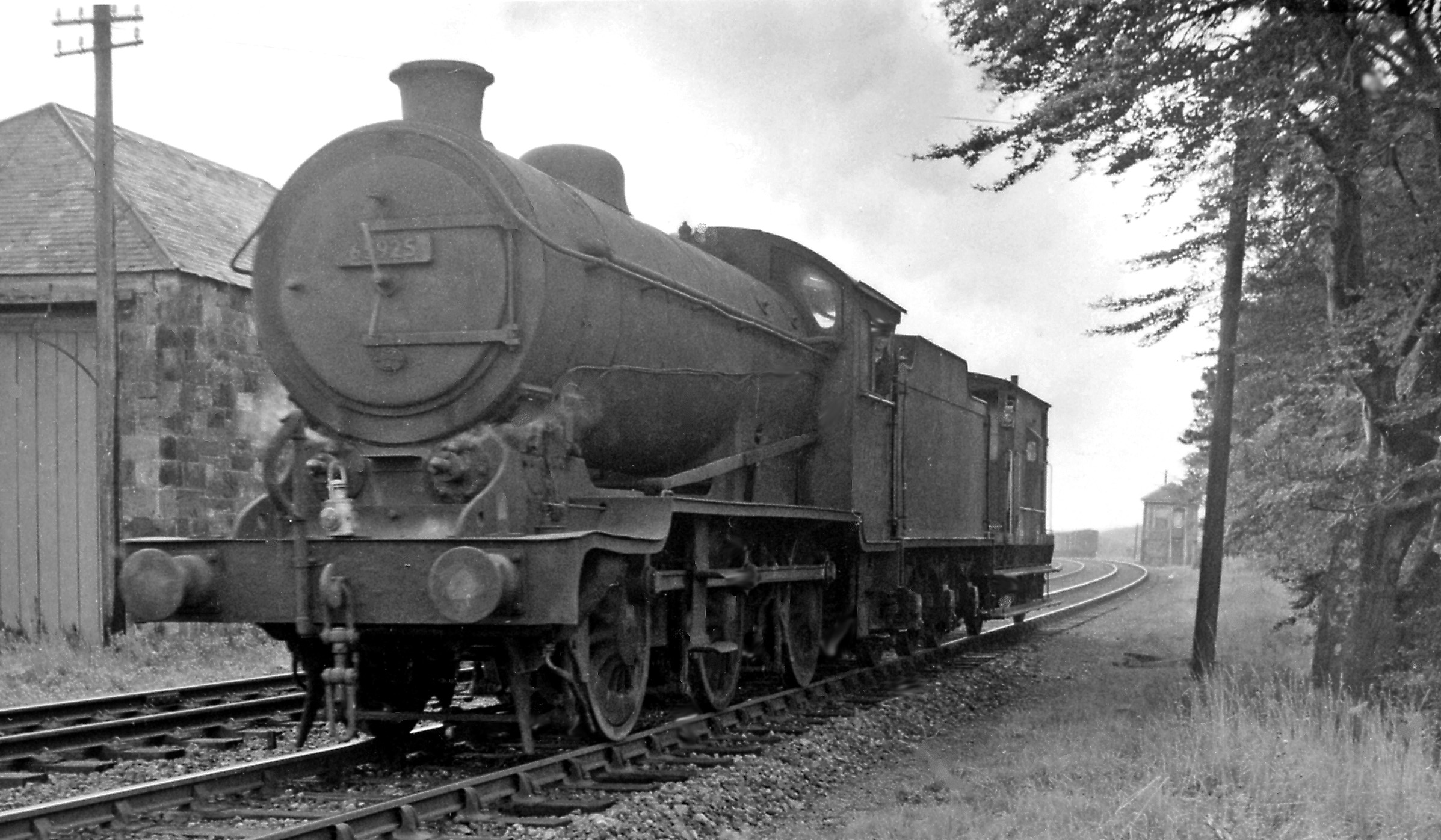
- A goods train at the station in 1962

General information
- Location: Forestmill, Clackmannanshire; Scotland
- Platforms: 2

Other information
- Status: Disused

History
- Original company: North British Railway
- Post-grouping: LNER

Key dates
- 28 August 1850: Opened as Kincardine
- 18 December 1893: Name changed to Forest Mill
- 22 September 1930: Closed to passengers
- 6 October 1979: Closed to goods
Location

Forest Mill railway station served the hamlet of Forestmill, Clackmannanshire, Scotland from 1850 to 1930 on the Stirling and Dunfermline Railway.

== History ==
The station opened as Kincardine on 28 August 1850 by the North British Railway. To the east was the goods yard. To the west was a coal yard which was served by a siding to the east. The station's name was changed to Forest Mill on 18 December 1893. It closed to passengers on 22 September 1930 but remained open for goods until 6 October 1979.

Preceding station	Disused railways	Following station
Clackmannan Road; Line and station closed	North British Railway; Stirling and Dunfermline Railway	Bogside (Fife); Line and station closed
