= Torryburn railway station =

Disused railway station in Torryburn, Fife

Torryburn

General information
- Location: Torryburn, Fife; Scotland
- Coordinates: 56.0589°N 3.5717°W
- Grid reference: NT022862
- Platforms: 1

Other information
- Status: Disused

History
- Original company: North British Railway
- Post-grouping: LNER

Key dates
- 2 July 1906: Opened
- 7 July 1930: Closed
Location

Torryburn railway station served the village of Torryburn, Fife, Scotland from 1906 to 1930 on the Kincardine Line.

== History ==
The station was opened on 2 July 1906 by The Kincardine and Dunfermline Railway which had been incorporated by the North British Railway.

The goods yard was to the south of the line.

The station closed on 7 July 1930. Despite being closed the station was host to a LNER camping coach from 1937 to 1938 and campers were advised to take a bus to the coach from one of the Dunfermline stations.

Preceding station	Historical railways	Following station
Valleyfield; Line open, station closed	Kincardine Line	Cairneyhill; Line open, station closed
