= Clackmannan Road railway station =

Disused railway station in Clackmannanshire, Scotland

Coordinates: 56.1132°N 3.7387°W

Clackmannan Road

General information
- Location: Clackmannan, Clackmannanshire; Scotland
- Platforms: 2

Other information
- Status: Disused

History
- Original company: North British Railway
- Pre-grouping: North British Railway

Key dates
- 28 August 1850: Opened as Clackmannan
- 18 December 1893: Name changed to Clackmannan Road
- 1 January 1917: Closed
- 1 April 1919: Reopened
- 1 December 1921: Closed permanently
Location

Clackmannan Road railway station served the town of Clackmannan, Clackmannanshire, Scotland, from 1850 to 1921 on the Stirling and Dunfermline Railway.

== History ==
The station opened as Clackmannan on 28 August 1850 by the North British Railway. The goods yard was to the northeast. The station's name was changed to Clackmannan Road in 1893 to avoid confusion with Clackmannan and Kennet, which opened around the same time. The station closed on 1 January 1917 but reopened on 1 April 1919, only to close again on 1 December 1921.

Preceding station	Disused railways	Following station
Alloa; Line closed, station open	North British Railway; Stirling and Dunfermline Railway	Forest Mill; Line and station closed
