= Alloa Ferry railway station =

Disused railway station in Alloa, Clackmannanshire

Alloa Ferry

General information
- Location: Alloa, Clackmannanshire; Scotland
- Coordinates: 56.1106°N 3.8004°W

Other information
- Status: Disused

History
- Original company: Stirling and Dunfermline Railway
- Pre-grouping: North British Railway

Key dates
- 3 June 1851: Opened
- 1 July 1852: Closed for passengers
- 28 February 1968: line closed

Alloa Ferry station was the terminus on the Stirling and Dunfermline Railway (S&DR) Alloa Harbour branch line that ran from Alloa. It opened on 3 June 1851, running down the east side of Glasshouse Loan to 150 yards (140 m) short of the ferry pier. The end of the branch was described in a local newspaper as where "an extensive goods shed has been erected and a comically diminutive station house has been put up".

Alloa Ferry station closed on 1 July 1852 when the line from Alloa to Stirling was opened. The line closed on 28 February 1968 when the goods service to the harbour was withdrawn.

Preceding station	Historical railways	Following station
Alloa; Line closed, station relocated and open	North British Railway; Stirling and Dunfermline Railway	Terminus
