= Kilbagie railway station =

Disused railway station in Kilbagie, Clackmannanshire

Coordinates: 56.0907°N 3.7198°W

Kilbagie

General information
- Location: Clackmannan, Clackmannanshire; Scotland
- Platforms: 1

Other information
- Status: Disused

History
- Original company: North British Railway
- Post-grouping: LNER

Key dates
- 17 September 1894: Opened
- 7 July 1930: Closed
Location

Kilbagie railway station served the town of Clackmannan, Clackmannanshire, Scotland from 1894 to 1930 on the Kincardine Line.

== History ==
The station opened on 17 September 1894 by the North British Railway. To the west was Kilbagie Paper Mill served by a line to the south. The station closed on 7 July 1930.

Preceding station	Historical railways	Following station
Clackmannan and Kennet; Line open, station closed	Kincardine Line	Kincardine; Line open, station closed
