= Gartmorn Dam =

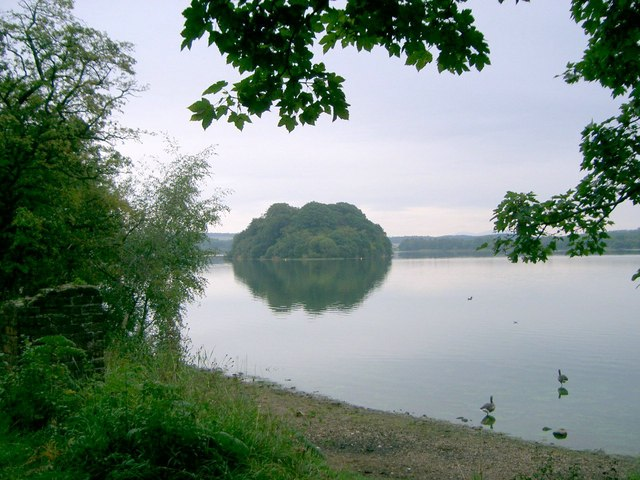
- The surface of Gartmorn Dam in 2006

- Location of Gartmorn Dam in Scotland
- Location: Clackmannanshire
- Coordinates: 56.1285°N 3.7393°W
- Type: Reservoir
- Basin countries: Scotland
- Construction engineer: George Sorocold
- First flooded: 1712

Gartmorn Dam is an artificial freshwater loch north-east of Alloa, Clackmannanshire, Scotland, UK, built in 1711–12 as a reservoir to supply water to hydraulic machines used in Alloa's mining industry. It was commissioned by John Erskine, 23rd and 6th Earl of Mar, to designs by George Sorocold, and is one of the earliest constructed reservoirs in Scotland.

== History ==
Gartmorn Dam was commissioned by John, Earl of Mar, a Scottish noble and estate owner, who had received training in drawing and architectural design, and was said to be 'infected with the desease of building'. Its purpose was to provide a sufficient head and volume of water to drive mining pumps supporting the extractive industry of Alloa.

The dam, lake and associated waterworks were designed by and built, from 1711 to 1712, by English civil engineer George Sorocold. Sorocold caused the construction of a weir on the Black Devon waterway at Forestmill, raising its waters by 16 foot (4.9 m), and a lade to carry water about 2 miles (3.2 km) westward to Gartmorn, where it was impounded by an earth dike. The lake formed has a surface of about 160 acres (65 ha), reaches a maximum depth of 37 feet (11 m) deep, (Note: A number of nineteenth-century descriptions of the lake use a measure "being sufficient to carry a seventy-four gun ship" to emphasise the depth of the lake.) and it situated about 160 foot (49 m) above the level of the River Forth, and 92 foot (28 m) above Alloa. It is considered the earliest constructed reservoir in Scotland, and was for many years the largest artificial lake in Scotland.

The reservoir's dam, some 320 yards (290 m) in length, was reconstructed in hewn stone in 1785 at a cost of several thousand pounds; and extensive repairs were made in 1827, to avert concerns that the structure might fail and inundate the lower parts of the town.

In contemporary times, Gartmorn Dam is used for leisure activities. The weir and lade remain in good condition. In 2013, Scottish Water spent £440,000 to maintain the dam headwall and improve emergency water level reduction systems.
