= Oakley (Fife) railway station =

Disused railway station in Oakley, Fife

Oakley (Fife)
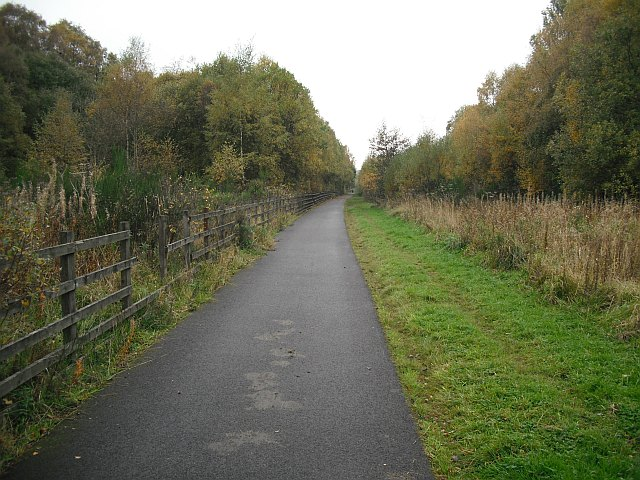
- The site of the station in 2009

General information
- Location: Oakley, Fife; Scotland
- Coordinates: 56.0813°N 3.5677°W
- Grid reference: NT025887
- Platforms: 2

Other information
- Status: Disused

History
- Original company: North British Railway
- Post-grouping: LNER; British Rail (Scottish Region)

Key dates
- 28 August 1850: Opened as Oakley
- 9 March 1925: Name changed to Oakley (Fife)
- 7 October 1968: Closed to passengers
- 1986: Closed to goods
Location

Oakley (Fife) railway station served the village of Oakley, Fife, Scotland from 1850 to 1986 on the Stirling and Dunfermline Railway.

== History ==
The station opened as Oakley on 28 August 1850 by the North British Railway. To the west was the goods yard and the private line to Forth Iron Works and Comrie Colliery. The station's name was changed to Oakley (Fife) on 9 March 1925. The goods yard was replaced in the 1950s with exchange sidings being laid. A signal box opened in 1954. The station closed to passengers on 7 October 1968.

Preceding station	Disused railways	Following station
East Grange (Fife); Line and station closed	North British Railway; Stirling and Dunfermline Railway	Dunfermline Upper; Line and station closed
