= Kincardine railway station =

Disused railway station in Kincardine, Fife

Kincardine

General information
- Location: Kincardine, Fife; Scotland
- Coordinates: 56.0682°N 3.7227°W
- Grid reference: NS928874
- Platforms: 1; 2 (later added)

Other information
- Status: Disused

History
- Original company: North British Railway
- Post-grouping: LNER

Key dates
- 18 December 1893: Opened
- 7 July 1930: Closed
Location

Kincardine railway station served the town of Kincardine, Fife, Scotland from 1893 to 1930 on the Kincardine Line.

== History ==
The station opened on 18 December 1893 by the North British Railway. It was originally a terminus of the line, opening before Clackmannan and Kennet and Kilbagie. The goods yard was to the north. A second platform was added in 1906 when the line to the east was extended. The original signal box was also replaced at this time. The station closed to passengers on 7 July 1930.

== Reopening ==
Plans have been submitted for a new station at Kincardine. The site is currently being surveyed and electrification of the line has also been planned.

| Preceding station | Historical railways | Following station |
|---|---|---|
| Kilbagie; Line open, station closed | Kincardine Line | Culross; Line open, station closed |
