= Cambus railway station =

Disused railway station in Cambus, Clackmannanshire

Cambus
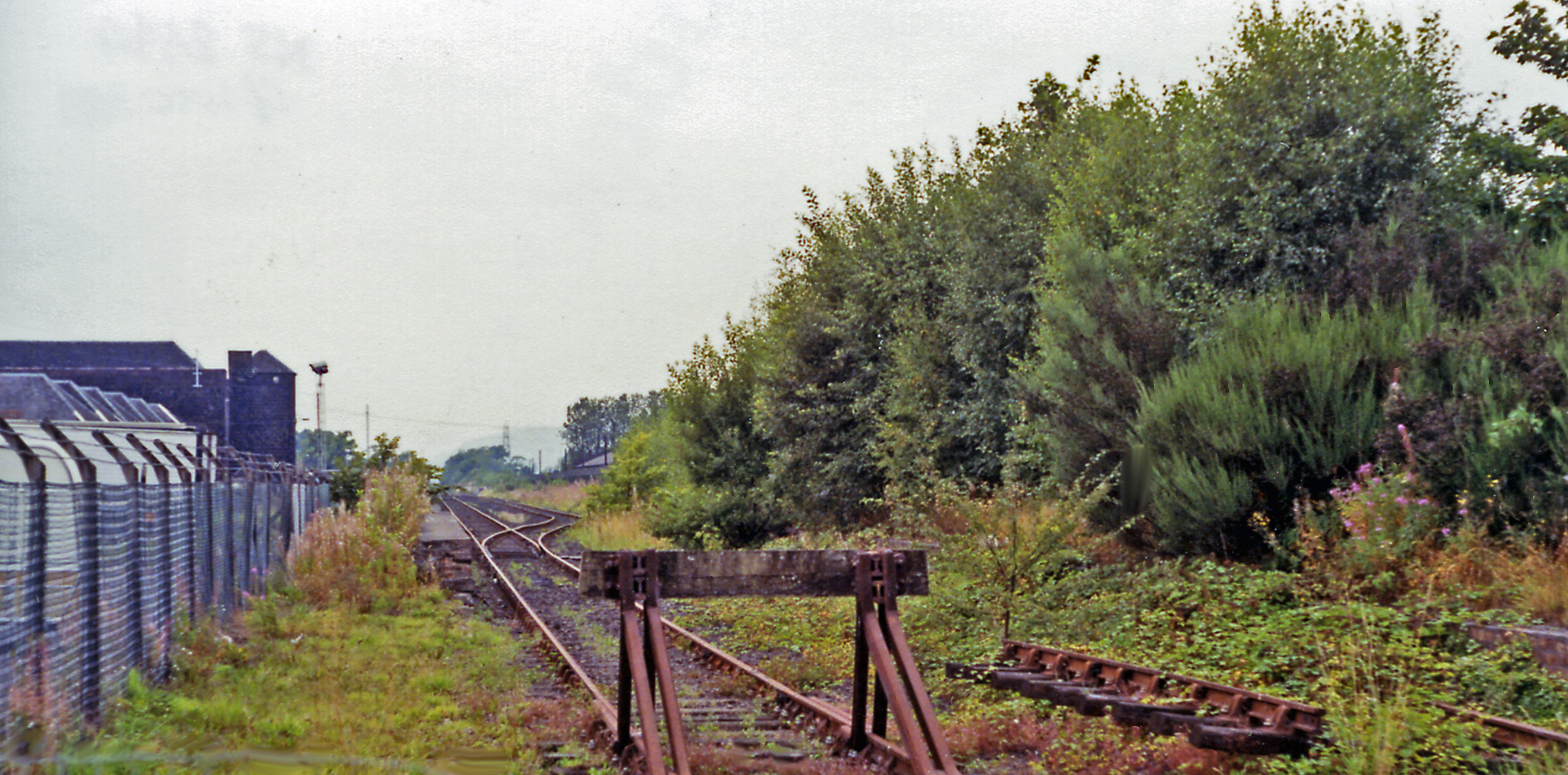
- The site of the station in 1991

General information
- Location: Cambus, Clackmannanshire; Scotland
- Coordinates: 56.1268°N 3.8428°W
- Grid reference: NS855942
- Platforms: 3

Other information
- Status: Disused

History
- Original company: North British Railway
- Pre-grouping: North British Railway
- Post-grouping: LNER; British Railways (Scottish Region)

Key dates
- 1 July 1852: Opened
- 7 October 1968: Closed
Location

Cambus railway station served the suburb of Cambus, Clackmannanshire, Scotland from 1852 to 1968 on the Stirling and Dunfermline Railway.

== History ==
The station opened on 1 July 1852 by the North British Railway. To the south was a goods yard which served Cambus Distillery to the north and was served by a curved siding. Also to the north was Forth Brewery, which was served by a siding from the west. To the west was the signal box. The station closed on 7 October 1968.

Preceding station	Historical railways	Following station
Blackgrange; Line open, station closed	North British Railway; Stirling and Dunfermline Railway	Alloa; Line and station open
