= Black Devon =

River in Scotland

Coordinates: 56.140°N 3.49°W

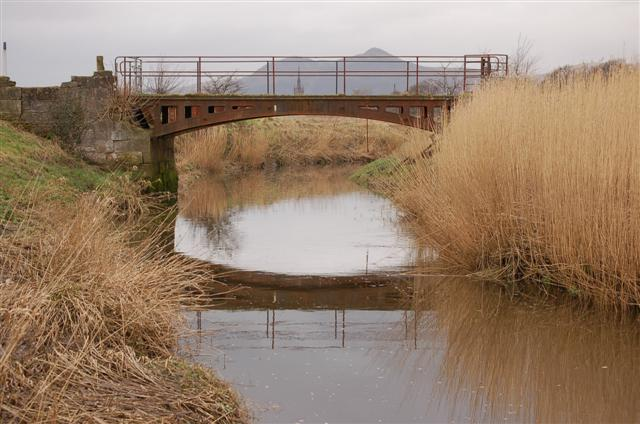
The Black Devon south of Alloa

The Black Devon (Scottish Gaelic: Duibhe Bheag, "little black river" or Duibhe Dhubh, "black black river") is a river in Scotland. The name is tautological, with Devon coming from a Pictish word meaning black. It rises in the Cleish Hills, specifically the area known as Outh Muir, 1.5 kilometres (0.9 mi) north of Knockhill Racing Circuit, around 9 kilometres (6 mi) north-west of Dunfermline, Fife, with the gathering of three small streams in branch formation. The river flows westwards through Balgonar, north of Saline, and then merges with the Saline Burn. The Black Devon flows into Clackmannanshire, through the hamlet of Forestmill and past the town of Clackmannan. The Black Devon enters the River Forth south of Alloa, 1 kilometre (0.6 mi) north of Dunmore Pier.

It is a narrow and shallow river that holds wild brown trout, and also sees sea trout in winter months that come into the Firth of Forth, which is tidal as far as Stirling. The Rivers and Fisheries Trusts of Scotland manage the River Forth and its tributary rivers, which besides the Black Devon include the River Devon, River Teith, and River Allan.

== Disappearance ==
In June 1952 the last two miles of the Black Devon disappeared into old coal mine workings. These eventually filled with a mixture of fresh and salt water, the river being tidal at the point where the collapse into the mine workings occurred.

== Wetland scheme ==
Coal mining over a long period of time, from probably at least three collieries working different strata, had caused significant subsidence around the lower reaches of the Black Devon and its confluence with the River Forth. There was also concern about the effects of rising sea levels generally. The area between the west bank of the Black Devon and the Forth had subsided considerably and had been useful for landfill, however modern environmental considerations meant that this had to cease. Accordingly, a scheme was devised to create a wetland area. The Royal Society for the Protection of Birds operates the wetland as a nature reserve, part of its Inner Forth conservation project.

== Gartmorn Dam ==
Gartmorn Dam is a reservoir which was initially designed and built in 1712 by George Sorocold for John Erskine, Earl of Mar (1675–1732), and later upgraded several times by others, to provide water power for the pumps which drained his collieries in Alloa. Gartmorn Dam does not lie on the Black Devon, but is fed from it by a lade originating at a weir in the Black Devon just above Forestmill. Today Gartmorn Dam is used for leisure activities. The weir and lade remain in good condition. In 2013, Scottish Water spent £440,000 to maintain the dam headwall and improve emergency water level reduction systems.

== Other industries ==
The 1956 2 1/2 inch OS map shows weirs and the Linn Mill, traces of which still exist, at NS 926930 and further downstream a woollen mill, now obliterated by a housing estate, at NS 914923, apparently worked by water power.
