= Alloa railway station =

Railway station in Clackmannanshire, Scotland

Alloa Scottish Gaelic: Alamhagh
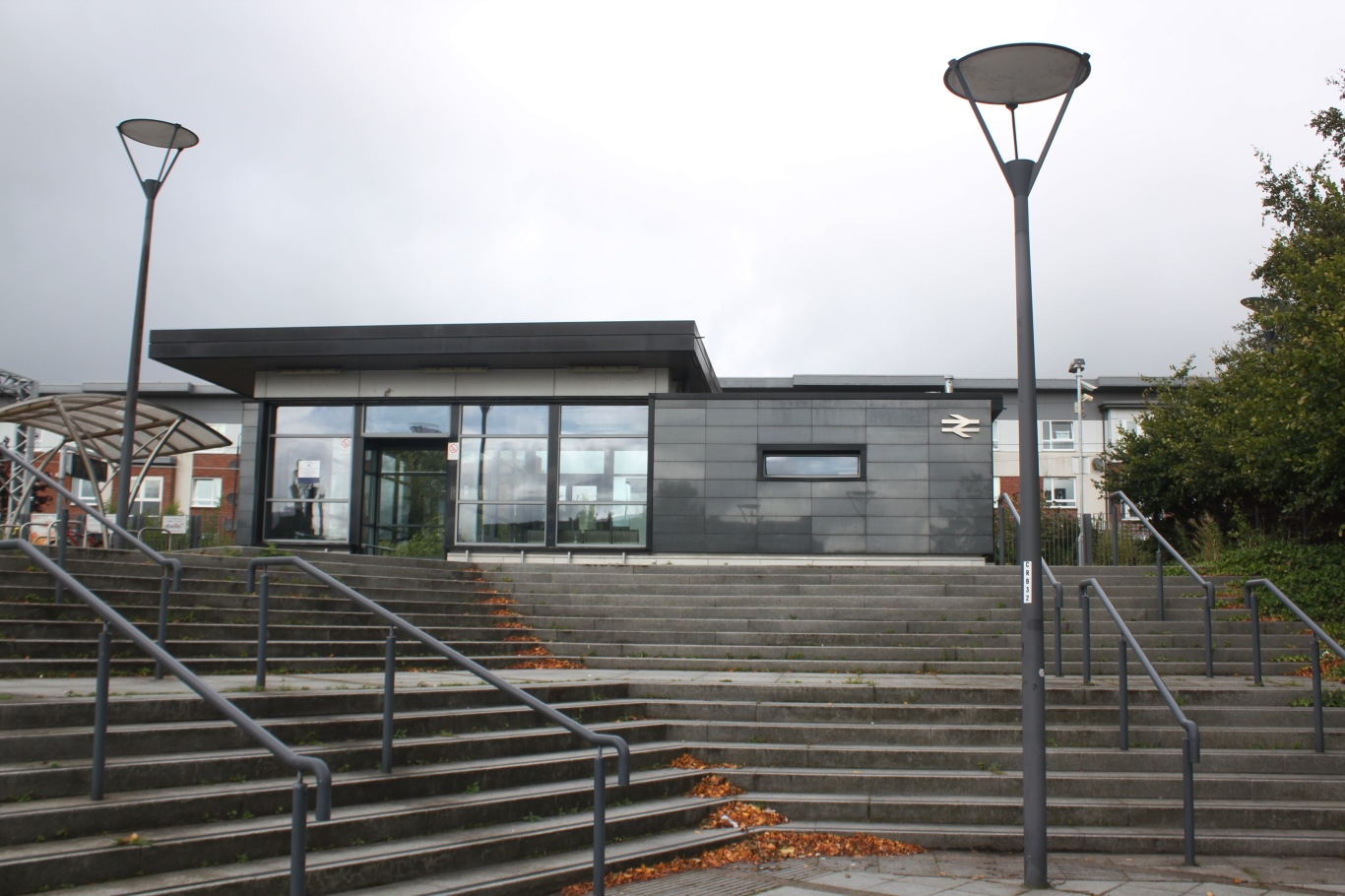

General information
- Location: Alloa, Clackmannanshire; Scotland
- Coordinates: 56.1179°N 3.7883°W
- Grid reference: NS888931
- Manager: ScotRail
- Platforms: 1

Other information
- Station code: ALO

History
- Original company: Stirling and Dunfermline Railway
- Pre-grouping: North British Railway
- Post-grouping: LNER

Key dates
- 28 August 1850: Opened
- 7 October 1968: Closed
- 15 May 2008: Official reopening ceremony of new station
- 19 May 2008: New station opened to regular passenger traffic on different site

Passengers
- 2020/21: ▼70,732
- 2021/22: ▲0.259 million
- 2022/23: ▲0.355 million
- 2023/24: ▲0.497 million
- 2024/25: ▲0.529 million
Location
Notes
- Passenger statistics from the Office of Rail and Road

Alloa railway station is a railway station in Alloa, Clackmannanshire, Scotland.

The station was first opened in 1850 and operated until 1968. The original station building from 1850 was replaced by a new structure in 1887, which was demolished following the closure to passengers of the railway lines in 1968.

The Scottish Executive funded the reopening of the railway line between Stirling and Alloa and the station was reopened on 19 May 2008.

== History ==
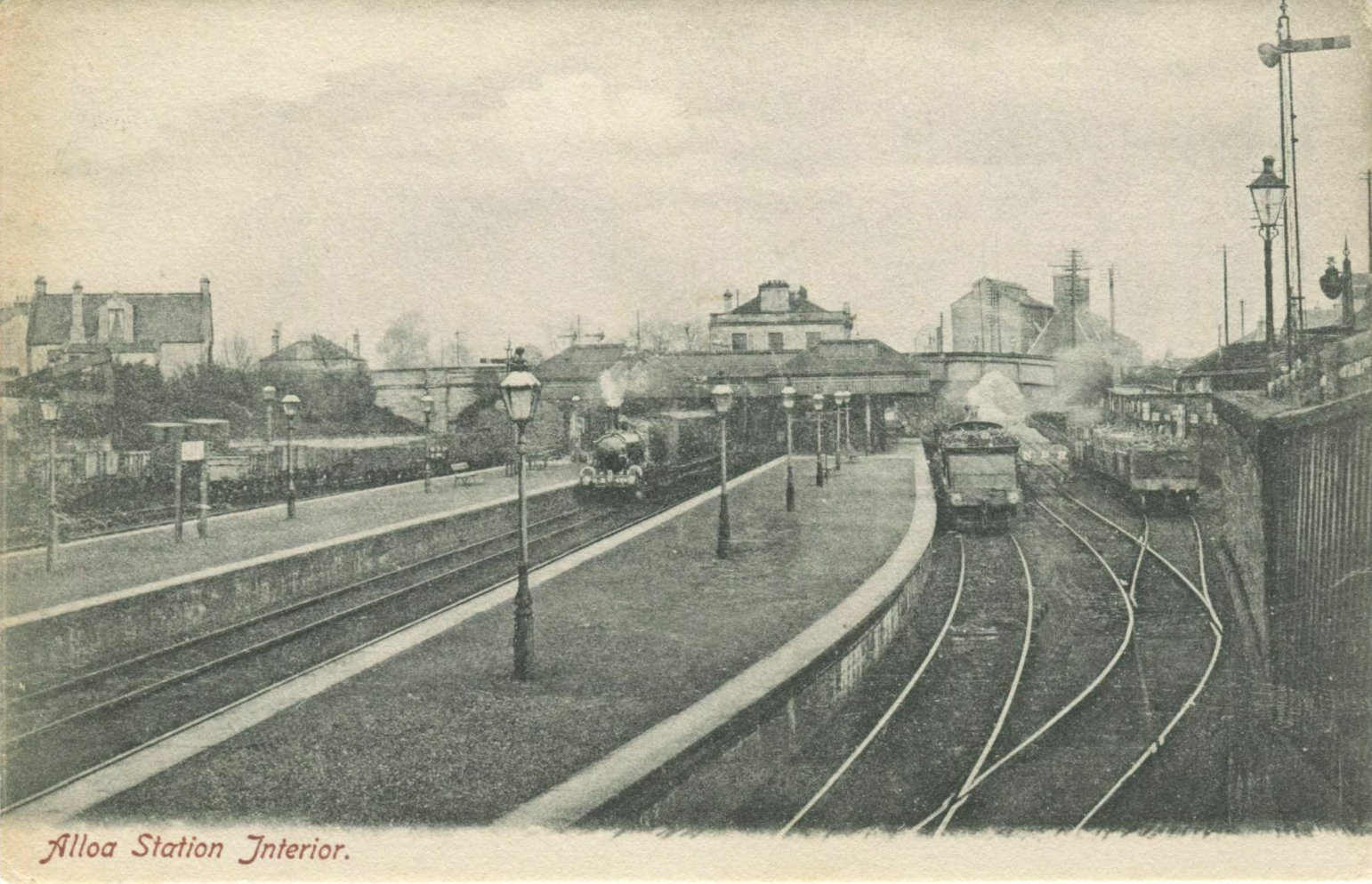
The station seen in 1895

The original Alloa station was opened by the Stirling and Dunfermline Railway (S&DR) on 28 August 1850 when the line from Oaklay to Alloa was opened.

In 1850 the main station building was to the west of Greenfield Bridge and south of the rails, it consisted of a ticket office leading onto a platform and an island platform with a "passenger shed" on the north of the running lines, both "arranged as to accommodate parties intending to travel on either the main line or the Tillicoultry branch". There was a goods yard, with a large shed, to the north and sidings both sides, on the east of Greenfield Bridge was a two-road engine shed and turntable.

Passengers for Stirling were able to continue via ferry along the River Forth to Stirling under their own arrangements, the S&DR advertised times and fares between Alloa and Dunfermline but made no mention of a ferry.

The station became both a junction and a through station on 3 June 1851 when the branches to Tillicoultry and Alloa Harbour with a terminal at Alloa Ferry opened.

The station was called Alloa North (and sometimes North Alloa) between 1875 and 1882 after which the North was dropped. Subsequent links were added southwards to Larbert via the Alloa Railway in 1885.

The network was finally completed in 1906 with the opening of a second line to Dunfermline via Kincardine and Longannet along the northern bank of the Forth estuary. This line carried a passenger service until July 1930. Freight services ceased on 6 April 1981.

A number of alterations were undertaken in 1885 to accommodate the Caledonian Railway using the station when the Alloa swing bridge and branch opened. Prior to these improvements the local newspaper described the NBR station as a "small and dingy-looking erection which has ... for many years been an eye-sore to the town's people, and quite inadequate for the traffic; and although it has been improved upon from time to time, these improvements have only made its incapacity to meet the requirements of modern tastes and the greatly increased traffic the more apparent."

To accommodate the CR at its station the NBR firstly opened a new goods station on 21 September 1885 to the east of Glasshouse Loan on the Harbour branch in order to create some space at the passenger station, it also undertook some alterations to the station itself prior to a major rebuilding scheduled for the following few years.

The CR opened its own goods station at a site on the western side of Glasshouse Loan, directly opposite the NBR one. The CR set up its own passenger booking office at Alloa station, in what had formerly been the parcel office.

The rebuilt station opened on 22 November 1887, there was a new station building on the east side of Greenfield Bridge with a gated entrance from the bridge onto a forecourt. The booking hall was described as a "fine spacious room" with offices for both Companies, and access to the parcel office "fitted up with one of the modern hydraulic hoists". A wide staircase went down to the platform where there were four waiting rooms; general, ladies, ladies' first-class and gentlemen's first-class. There was a refreshment room, telegraph office, "commodious lavatories" and railway administration offices. The wide island platform, with two inset bays at its west end extended a long way westward under Greenfield Bridge and had extensive awnings.

=== Closure ===
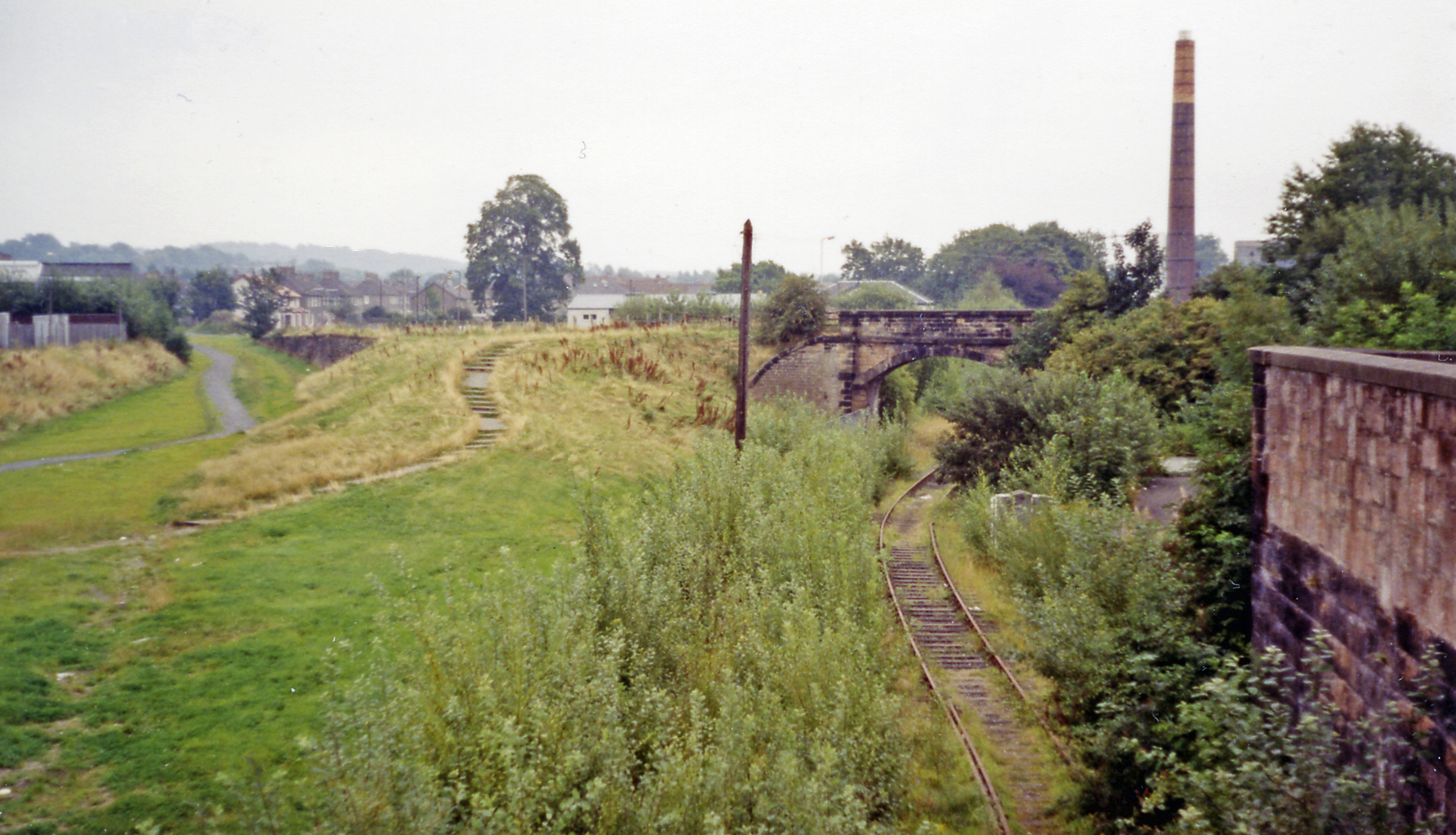
The station site seen in 1991

During the mid-1960s the lines around Alloa were progressively closed. The passenger service to Tillicoultry was the first to go on 15 June 1964 (with total closure following on 25 June 1973, with the ending of coal-mining at Dollar).

The line across the swing bridge to Larbert followed in January 1968.

The station itself together with the main former S&DR line from Stirling via Cambus through Alloa and on to Dumfermline Upper was then closed to passengers on 7 October 1968. Freight services continued until 1979, though the nearby Alloa marshalling yard to the west remained open until 1988 (latterly used only by the trip freights to the yeast factory at Menstrie). Following the full closure of Alloa station, a leisure centre was built on the site, though a narrowed formation and a single track was kept for freight services.

The remainder of the original S&DR through the station towards the east continued in use for colliery traffic until 1979 (this has since been lifted) and the Kincardine branch until 6 April 1981. This latter route was left derelict but intact for some years and has since been reopened, along with the station (see below).

=== Re-opening ===
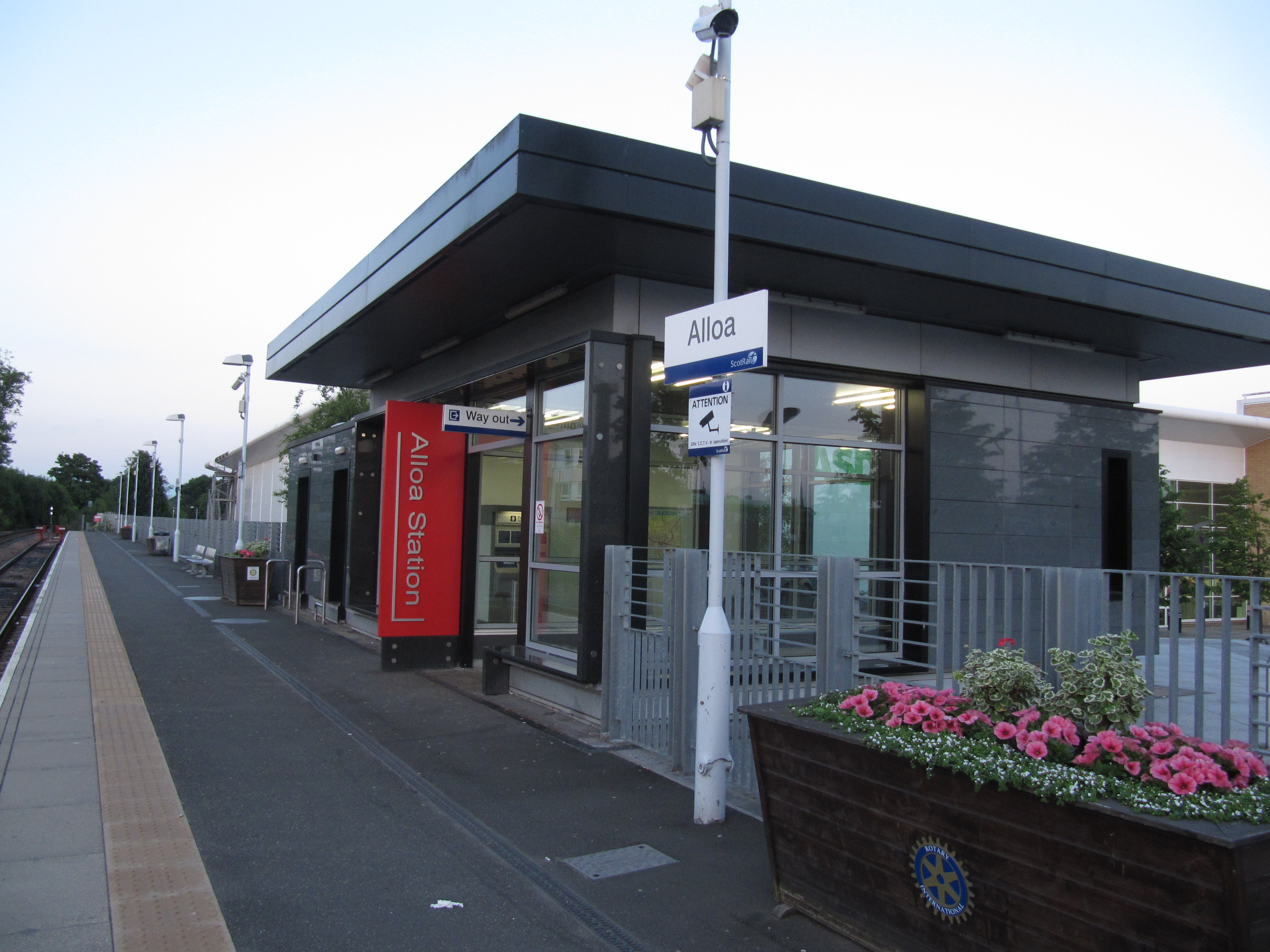
The reopened station seen in 2013

The new station building was designed by IDP Architects.

In 2008, the railway reopened, with a new Alloa station situated to the east of its predecessor, due to the earlier construction of the leisure centre. A passenger-operated self-service ticket machine was installed in July 2008; the illustrated ticket was issued at Stirling station.

Under Scottish Executive funding, the line between Stirling and Alloa was reopened to both passenger and freight traffic, with a key benefit being a reduction in congestion on the Forth Railway Bridge. Construction work started in 2005, with track laying commencing at the end of September 2006. It was originally projected that the station would reopen to passenger traffic in the Summer of 2007 but this date was then put back to allow for the upgrading of a level crossing.

The official opening took place on 15 May 2008.

Passenger use of the new railway station has greatly exceeded forecasts and since re-opening the service has been improved by increasing evening and Sunday frequencies from two-hourly to hourly and by adding the peak hour service to Edinburgh in 2009. In its first year the station was used by 400,000 passengers, against a forecast of 155,000.

== Facilities ==
The station has a nearby car park with 64 spaces but is not permanently staffed. The completion of electrification of the railway between Polmont Junction, Stirling, Dunblane and Alloa during 2018 allowed the introduction of electric-powered rolling stock for services from 9 December 2018.

== Services ==
The current service (2023) gives a mostly half-hourly train to Stirling and Glasgow seven days a week. The journey time to Stirling is timetabled to take 9–10 minutes. Services are usually operated by Class 385 EMUs. Connections for Falkirk and Edinburgh can be made at Stirling.

Preceding station	National Rail	Following station
Stirling	ScotRail; Croy Line	Terminus
	Historical railways	
Cambus; Line open; station closed	North British Railway; Stirling and Dunfermline Railway	Clackmannan Road; Line and station closed
Cambus; Line open; station closed	North British Railway; Stirling and Dunfermline Railway; Tillicoultry Branch	Sauchie; Line and station closed
Terminus	North British Railway; Kincardine Line	Clackmannan and Kennet; Line open; station closed
Throsk; Line and station closed	Caledonian Railway; Alloa Railway	Terminus

== Bibliography ==
- Butt, R. V. J. (October 1995). The Directory of Railway Stations: details every public and private passenger station, halt, platform and stopping place, past and present (1st ed.). Sparkford: Patrick Stephens Ltd. ISBN 978-1-85260-508-7. OCLC 60251199. OL 11956311M.
- Jowett, Alan (March 1989). Jowett's Railway Atlas of Great Britain and Ireland: From Pre-Grouping to the Present Day (1st ed.). Sparkford: Patrick Stephens Ltd. ISBN 978-1-85260-086-0. OCLC 22311137.
- Jowett, Alan (2000). Jowett's Nationalised Railway Atlas (1st ed.). Penryn, Cornwall: Atlantic Transport Publishers. ISBN 978-0-906899-99-1. OCLC 228266687.
