= Forestmill =

Coordinates: 56°7′30″N 3°41′12″W

Forestmill (or Forest Mill) is a small hamlet in the county of Clackmannanshire, Scotland. It is situated on the A977 road between Kincardine and Kinross, about 3 miles from the Kincardine end.

The Black Devon river runs through it towards the town of Clackmannan. A notable feature on the river within Forestmill is a horseshoe weir. This was built in 1711 by George Sorocold to direct water from the river through a sluice into the mill lade that fed the Gartmorn Dam reservoir. The weir was added to the schedule of British listed monuments in 1972.

The nearby Forest Mill railway station served the hamlet from 1850 to 1930.

The Scottish poet Michael Bruce taught at the primary school for several months before his death in 1767.

The Clackmannanshire Council website shows the hamlet with a population of 55 in 2009, making it the smallest settlement in the county. However, in 2009, initial planning permission was granted for a significant expansion of the village by the Muir Group. A proposal to build over 1,200 houses, shops, hotel and golf course has been agreed by the council, despite some opposition by local residents.

== See also ==
- List of places in Clackmannanshire
