= Clackmannan and Kennet railway station =

Closed railway station in Clackmannanshire, Scotland

Clackmannan and Kennet
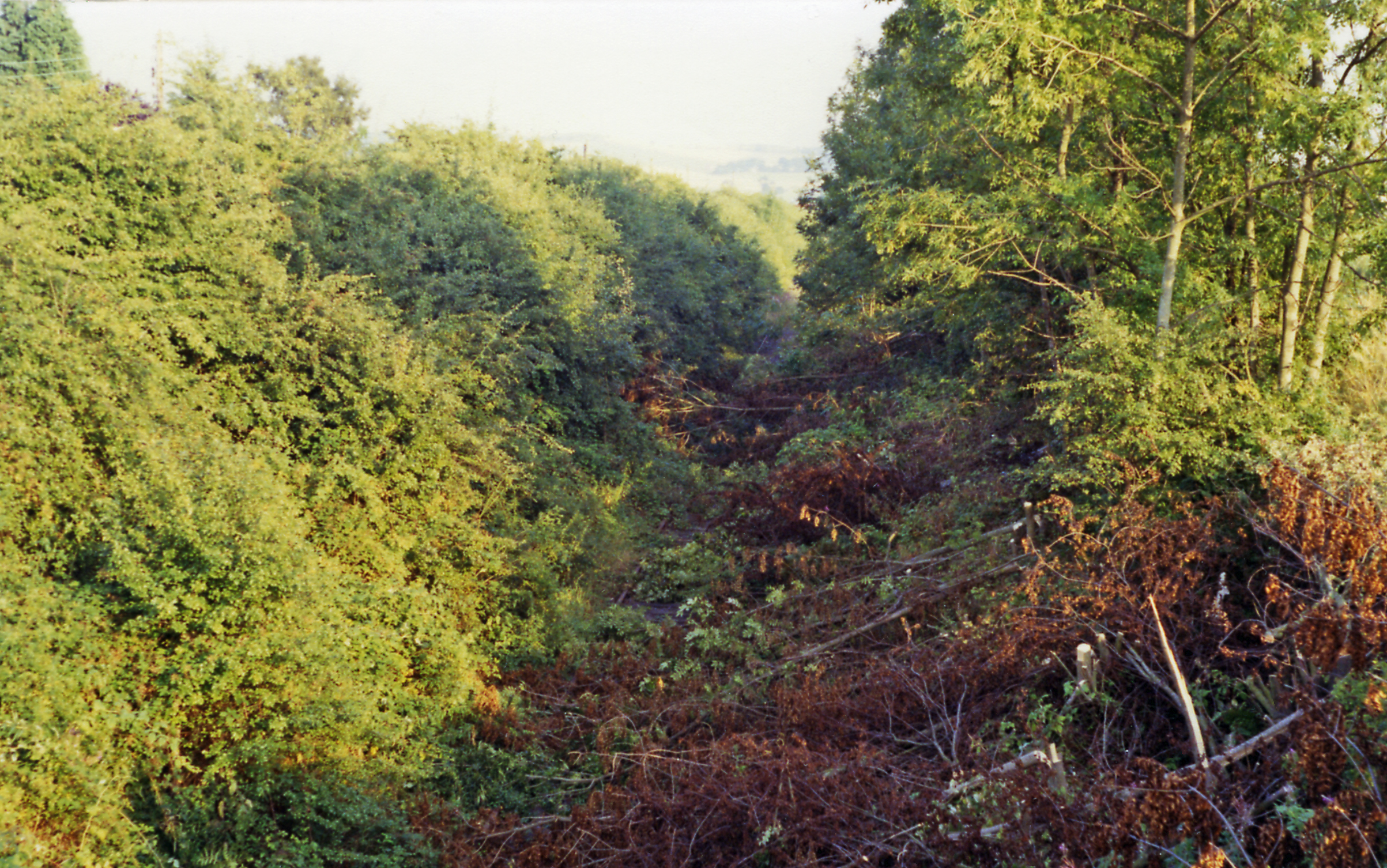
- The site of the station in 1991

General information
- Location: Clackmannan, Clackmannanshire; Scotland
- Coordinates: 56.1078°N 3.7451°W
- Grid reference: NS915919
- Platforms: 1

Other information
- Status: Disused

History
- Original company: North British Railway
- Post-grouping: LNER

Key dates
- 18 December 1893: Opened
- 7 July 1930: Closed
- 2008: Line re-opened
Location

Clackmannan and Kennet railway station served the town of Clackmannan, Clackmannanshire, from 1893 to 1930 on the Kincardine Line.

== History ==
The station opened on 18 December 1893 by the North British Railway. To the southeast was the goods yard. The station closed on 7 July 1930.

=== Infrastructure ===
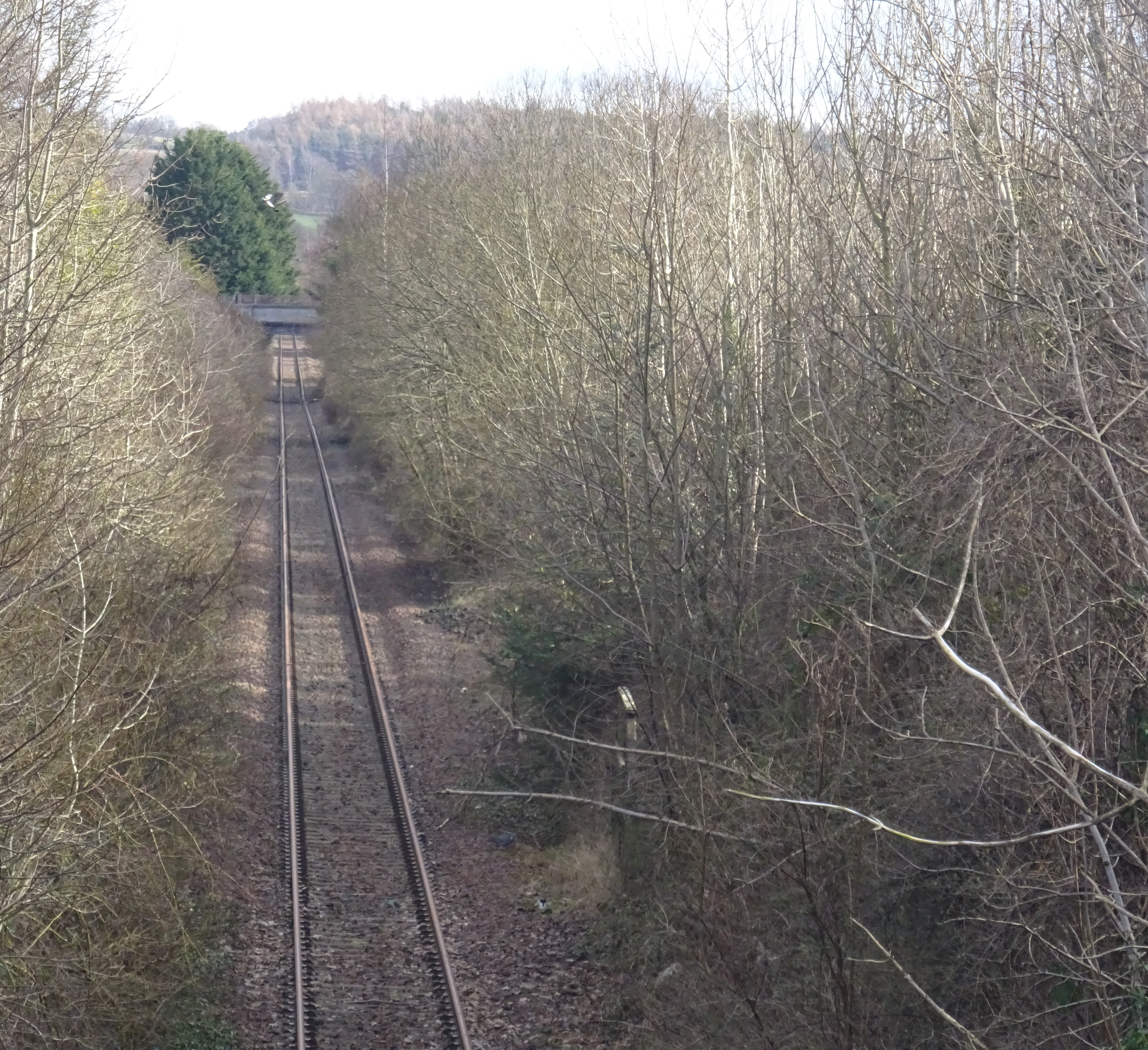
View towards the site of the station in 2024

The OS map shows that the station building and platform stood on the south side of the single track line. The station's road access was from near the Cattle Market road end and the goods yard lay on the Kincardine side with two sidings and a head-shunt, one siding running beside a loading dock. A weighing machine is marked. No signal box or signals are shown. The small station building had a section with an awning. A footpath runs from the goods yard to a house that stands on the main road, indicative of a stationmaster's house.

=== Line reopening ===
In 2008 the line, but not the station, was re-opened to freight traffic together with a passenger service as far as Alloa railway station running from Stirling.

Preceding station	Historical railways	Following station
Alloa; Line and station open	Kincardine Line	Kilbagie; Line open, station closed
