= Kincardine Line =

Railway line in Scotland

Overview
- Locale: Scotland
- Dates of operation: 1 June 1906–31 December 1922
- Successor: London and North Eastern Railway

Technical
- Track gauge: 1,435 mm (4 ft 8 1/2 in)

The Kincardine Line is a railway in Clackmannanshire and Fife, Scotland. The line, which was opened in two stages by the North British Railway, was built to serve settlements between Alloa and Dunfermline along the north shore of the Firth of Forth. It was a never profitable railway; passenger services were withdrawn in 1930, goods in 1962.

In 1952, work began on the construction Kincardine power station this led to the reopening of the eastern end of the line. This was followed by Longannet power station in 1962. Fuel for both coal-fired power stations was brought in using the Kincardine Line. In 2016, Longannet was decommissioned bringing heavy mineral traffic to an end. A review has now been undertaken to consider re-opening the line to passenger services on the route.

== Background ==
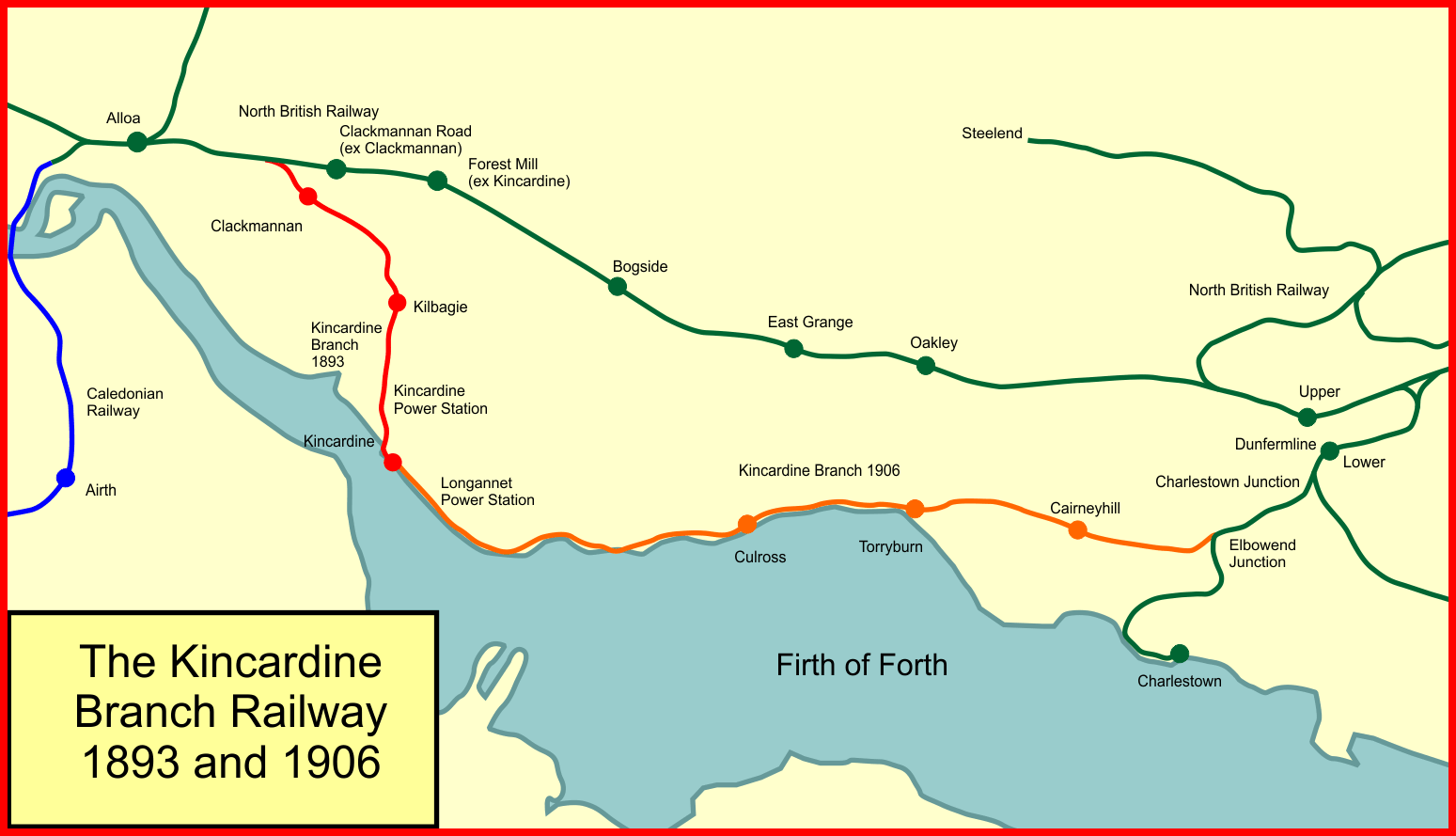
Railways of the Kincardine line

During the promotion of railways in 1845 that resulted in the major expansion of the Scottish railway network, the Scottish Central Railway was authorised to build from Castlecary, on the Edinburgh and Glasgow Railway, to Perth through Stirling. On the eastern side, the Edinburgh and Northern Railway was authorised to build from Burntisland to Perth and Tayport, for Dundee. The Edinburgh and Northern also obtained permission to build a branch line from Thornton to Dunfermline.

The following year, 1846, saw the authorisation of the Stirling and Dunfermline Railway, running through Alloa. All these lines were substantially complete by 1849. Although there were stations at Clackmannan Road and Kincardine, they were not in ideal locations. The attraction of Dunfermline railways were the considerable number of coalfields in the area.

== Proposal ==
By 1865, both the Edinburgh and Northern Railway and the Stirling and Dunfermline Railway had become part of the North British Railway, while the Scottish Central Railway had become a part of the rival Caledonian Railway. The Caledonian had a dense network of railways in central Scotland, and continually hoped to reach the east coast ports and the rich Fife coalfield. The North British Railway responded by promoting its own lines serving the areas thought to be of interest to the Caledonian, so as to be able to demonstrate to Parliament that they were adequately serving the districts.

In 1888 the North British Railway proposed a line connecting a junction near Clackmannan station with Kincardine because it had a ferry service of the Firth of Forth, which NBR planned to also acquire. However this stayed a low priority for the NBR and the idea came to nothing.

== First line ==
As Kirkcaldy was known to be a Caledonian objective, the NBR obtained authorisation to build a line from near Alloa to Kilbagie and Kincardine. The line opened on 18 December 1893. (Note: Stansfield (in Stirling and Clackmannanshire's and also in Fife's) says to Kilbagie only on 18 December 1893.)

The line ran from a new junction called Kincardine Junction, a few miles east of Alloa on the Dunfermline line through Clackmannan, Kilbagie, Kincardine, Culross, Torryburn and Cairneyhill to Elbowend Junction, where it joined the Charlestown branch line of the NBR. From there trains reached Comely Park in Dunfermline (later Dunfermline Lower).

== Connecting line ==
A branch line to Kincardine was not enough to satisfy the demands for a better railway service in the area, and connecting Kincardine and Dunfermline was proposed. The Kincardine and Dunfermline Railway was the result, authorised by the North British Railway (General Powers) Act, 1898. It was to leave the Charlestown line at Meadowend and then run by Cairneyhill, Torryburn and Culross to meet the end of the existing Kincardine branch at Kincardine Pier.

Getting the Act kept the Caledonian Railway out, and actually constructing the railway was a lower priority. In fact the North British Railway had to apply for an extension of time to complete the line, in January 1903. The local authorities opposed the application, suspecting that the NBR had no intention of actually completing it. In fact the contract for the work was let in January 1904, and the line opened on 2 July 1906. (Note: Fife Free Press; also Ross, page 187 and 245, and Brotchie and Jack; Turnock says opened Kincardine to Dunfermline 30 June 1906 on page 38, and 20 June 1906 Kincardine to Culross on page 312 and 1 July 1906 Dunfermline to Culross.) The Meadowend to Elbowend section was on the alignment of the Elgin Railway of 1812, and from Meadowend to Lochymuir it was on the route of the 1783 waggonway.

The Fife Free Press reported the opening: "A fairly large number of passengers travelled on the newly branch railway to and from Kincardine which was opened to traffic on Monday [2 June 1906]. In the morning train from Kincardine about eighty persons came to the Dunfermline Lower station."

but the same newspaper was pessimistic about the economic activity of the locality:

"The line passes through a district very rich in mineral, which only awaits development, and opens up a charming bit of country abounding in historical and antiquarian associations. At one time the district in direct touch with the new railway was very much busier than now, having in fact seen better days, but the opening of the new line, which commences by a junction with the Dunfermline and Charlestown branch at Elbowend, with stations at Torryburn, Culross, and Kincardine-on-Forth, may be expected to waken it into new life."

Four passenger trains ran each way daily, with a fifth on Saturdays; but two of the trains were short workings from Alloa to Kincardine, so the new line only had two trains each way. The three intermediate stations were described as commodious. The passenger service was not well used, and it ceased from 7 July 1930. The goods service on the line was also poorly used, and it too closed in 1964.

== Stations ==
- Kincardine Junction;
- Clackmannan & Kennet opened 18 December 1893; closed 7 July 1930; (Clackmannan on the S&DR main line was renamed Clackmannan Road in 1893);
- Kilbagie; opened 7 September 1894; closed 7 July 1930;
- Kincardine; op 18 December 1893; closed 7 July 1930; Kincardine station on the main line was renamed Forest Mill 1893 and closed 22 Sep 1930;
- Culross; opened 2 July 1906; closed 7 July 1930;
- Valleyfield Platform; opened c. 1914; closed c1920;
- Torryburn; opened 2 July 1906; closed 7 July 1930;
- Cairneyhill; opened 2 July 1906; closed 7 July 1930;
- Elbowend Jn;
- Charlestown Jn.

== Power stations line ==
The railway was put back into use when two large coal-fired electricity generating stations were built near the line: Kincardine power station opened in 1962, but has now closed (in 1997) and Longannet power station, opened in 1970. Both these power stations had a huge demand for coal, which was brought in by rail from the Dunfermline end, so that the eastern section of the route was re-opened. Changing patterns of coal delivery led to coal imported to Hunterston in Ayrshire being brought to Longannet from 2008, running via Alloa and the western end of the line, which is therefore now complete again.Nonetheless, Kincardine power station has long been closed and Longannet closed on 24 March 2016, so that freight train use of the line appears now to have no long term future.

== Reopening ==
It has been proposed that this "enables" re-opening of the line to passenger traffic, extending from Alloa to Dunfermline. It is not clear at present whether this is viable.
