= Kincardine power station =

Former coal-fired power station in Scotland

Kincardine Power Station
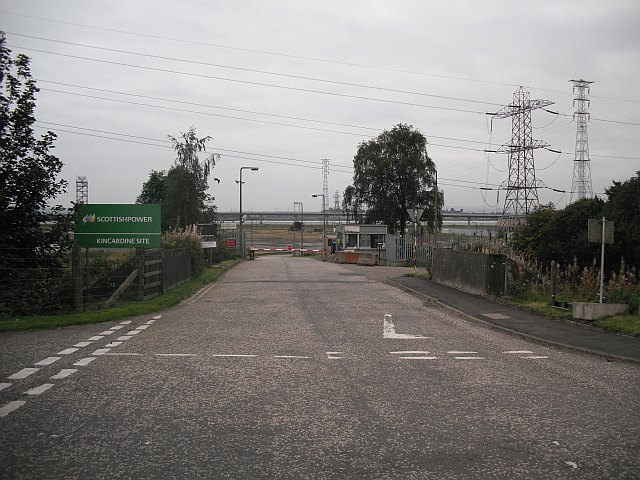
- Former Kincardine power station site in 2009
- Country: Scotland
- Location: Fife
- Coordinates: 56.0735°N 3.7285°W
- Status: Decommissioned and demolished
- Construction began: 1952
- Commission date: 1958
- Decommission date: 1997
- Construction cost: £36,250,000
- Owner: As operator
- Operators: South of Scotland Electricity Board; Scottish Power

Thermal power station
- Primary fuel: Coal
- Turbine technology: Steam turbines
- Site area: 140 acres (57 hectares)
- Chimneys: 2
- Cooling towers: None
- Cooling source: Estuary water

Power generation
- Units operational: 3 × 120 MW, 2 × 200 MW
- Units decommissioned: All
- Nameplate capacity: 760 MW

External links
- Commons: Related media on Commons

Kincardine power station was a 760 MW coal-fired power station on the shores of the upper Firth of Forth by Kincardine on Forth, Fife, Scotland.

== History ==
The station began construction in 1952 and started generating electricity in 1958. At the time of its opening it was the largest power station in Scotland. It was initially operated by the South of Scotland Electricity Board (SSEB). The station was constructed to take advantage of post-WW2 expansion of the Fife and Lothian coalfields. Coal was supplied by Merry-go-round trains. It was capable of generating 760 MW peak load, and when commissioned could produce up to one third of Scotland's total electricity needs.

It was officially opened by Queen and Duke of Edinburgh on 12 October 1960.

== Specification ==
Kincardine power station had one of the first 120 MW turbo-alternator units in the UK (the first to be commissioned was at Blyth A). The first set at Kincardine was commissioned on 28 December 1958. The steam conditions at the turbine stop valve were 1,500 psi and 1,000 °F with reheat to 1,000 °F (103.4 bar and 538 °C). An even more advanced 200 MW set was installed at Kincardine in the 1962. This included boilers rated at 1,350,000 lb/h (170.1 kg/s) capacity delivering steam at 2,350 psi and 1,050 °F (162 bar and 566 °C) with reheat to 1,000 °F. The boilers were by John Brown Land Boilers Limited.

The architect was Robert Matthew and the consulting engineers were Kennedy and Donkin.

== Operations ==
The station was formally opened by the Queen in October 1960. The station had cost £36,250,000, about £4M less than had been estimated in 1955. Upon opening it had three 120 MW units, 200 MW units were added in 1962 and 1963.

Water for the steam condensers was abstracted from and returned to the Forth. When fully commissioned the station drew 1,025 cubic feet per second (29.0 m^{3}/s) of cooling water. There were concerns about the re-circulation of discharged warm water back into the intake. The topography of the river was modelled which demonstrated that re-circulation would not be significant and the length of the culvert could be reduced.

Ash from the boilers was used to reclaim land from the estuary held behind a 9,000 ft (2,700 m) embankment.

Early in the operational life of the station it was found that aluminium brass condenser tubes were failing through corrosion. Research indicated the absence of a protective iron oxide film on the condenser tubes at Kincardine. A program to inject ferrous sulphate into the cooling water was instigated to provide iron to aid the formation of an oxide film.

Semi-automatic start up, loading and shutdown of generating sets was introduced at Kincardine in June 1966. This was associated with the change in the operation of the station from base load to two-shift working. This was the first time that such control has been used in the UK.

The rail facilities at Kincardine included five coal discharge filler pits including two tipplers, 8 railway sidings, an oil discharge facility, and a loco shed. These facilities were extant in 1996 but had been removed by 2007.

Operation of the station ceased in 1997, and the facility had been demolished by 2001.

== Redevelopment ==
A 275 kV substation still occupies part of the site, this has 275 kV high voltage connections to/from Currie, Fetteresso, Grangemouth, Longannet and Tealing substations.

The northern approach to the new Clackmannanshire Bridge built across the Firth of Forth and completed in late 2008 cuts across the extreme west end of the site. The site was used for the storage of a large quantity of track materials for the rebuilding of the Stirling-Alloa-Kincardine rail link, which is now operating, and is currently being used as a coal unloading and stockpiling area.

This facility was latterly owned by the privatised Scottish Power utility group.

== See also ==
- Kincardine Bridge
