= Stirling and Dunfermline Railway =

Former railway in Scotland

Overview
- Locale: Scotland
- Dates of operation: 16 July 1846–28 June 1858
- Successor: Edinburgh and Glasgow Railway

Technical
- Track gauge: 1,435 mm (4 ft 8 1/2 in)

The Stirling and Dunfermline Railway (S&DR) was a railway in Scotland connecting Stirling and Dunfermline. It was planned by the Edinburgh and Glasgow Railway to get access to the mineral deposits on the line of route, but also as a tactical measure to keep the rival Caledonian Railway out of Fife.

There were serious difficulties at the time of opening about a commitment to lease the railway, but it finally opened throughout in 1852. There was a branch to Tillicoultry, and the Devon Valley Railway built a line from there to Kinross.

A predecessor line, the Alloa Waggonway, had been developed as a horse-operated waggonway in the eighteenth century, bringing coal from the hinterland to Alloa and Clackmannan harbours; in its day the line was technologically advanced, but it was eclipsed by the modern Stirling and Dunfermline line.

The Alva Railway built a short branch line from Cambus, on the Stirling and Dunfermline line, opening in 1863.

Finally the Caledonian Railway built a viaduct over the Forth at Alloa, and the Caledonian and the North British Railway (which had taken over the Stirling and Dunfermline Railway) collaborated in operating the new short cut; much passenger and goods traffic ran over the bridge; the route was shared, with each company having running powers over the other's line.

All these lines closed in the period following 1950 when rail travel was waning, but the section between Stirling and Alloa has reopened in 2008, and carries a regular passenger service.

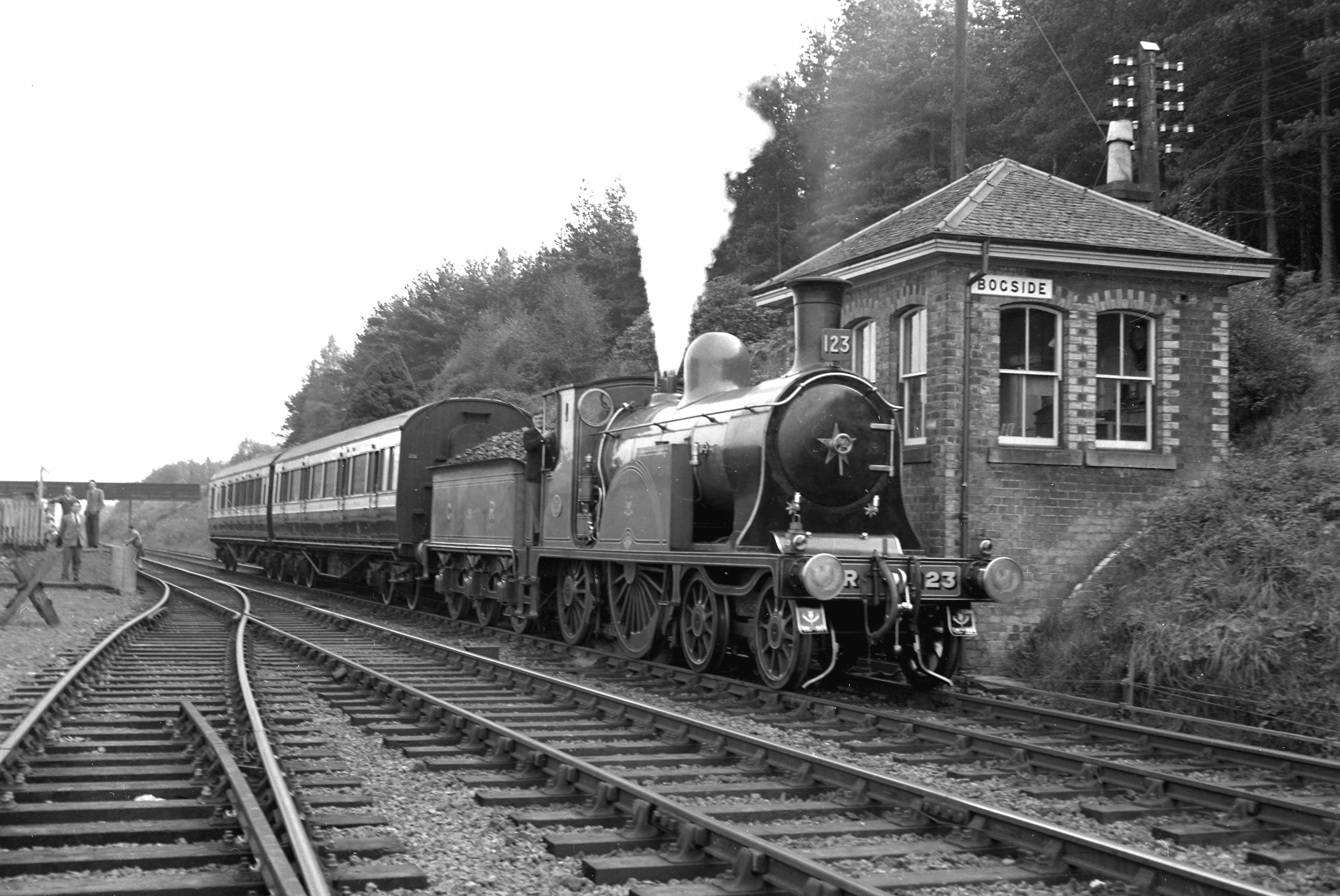
A specially chartered steam train passes Bogside signal box in 1959.

== History ==
=== Before railways ===
Dunfermline and Stirling had long been centres of commerce, and of regional government, and of industry. Intermediately, the town of Alloa, also situated close to the Forth, was an important industrial centre, known for brewing, glass manufacture, woollen goods, and collieries.

On the north side of the tract of land following the Forth the Ochil Hills present a natural barrier to northwards travel, being closest at the Stirling end.

=== The Alloa Railway ===
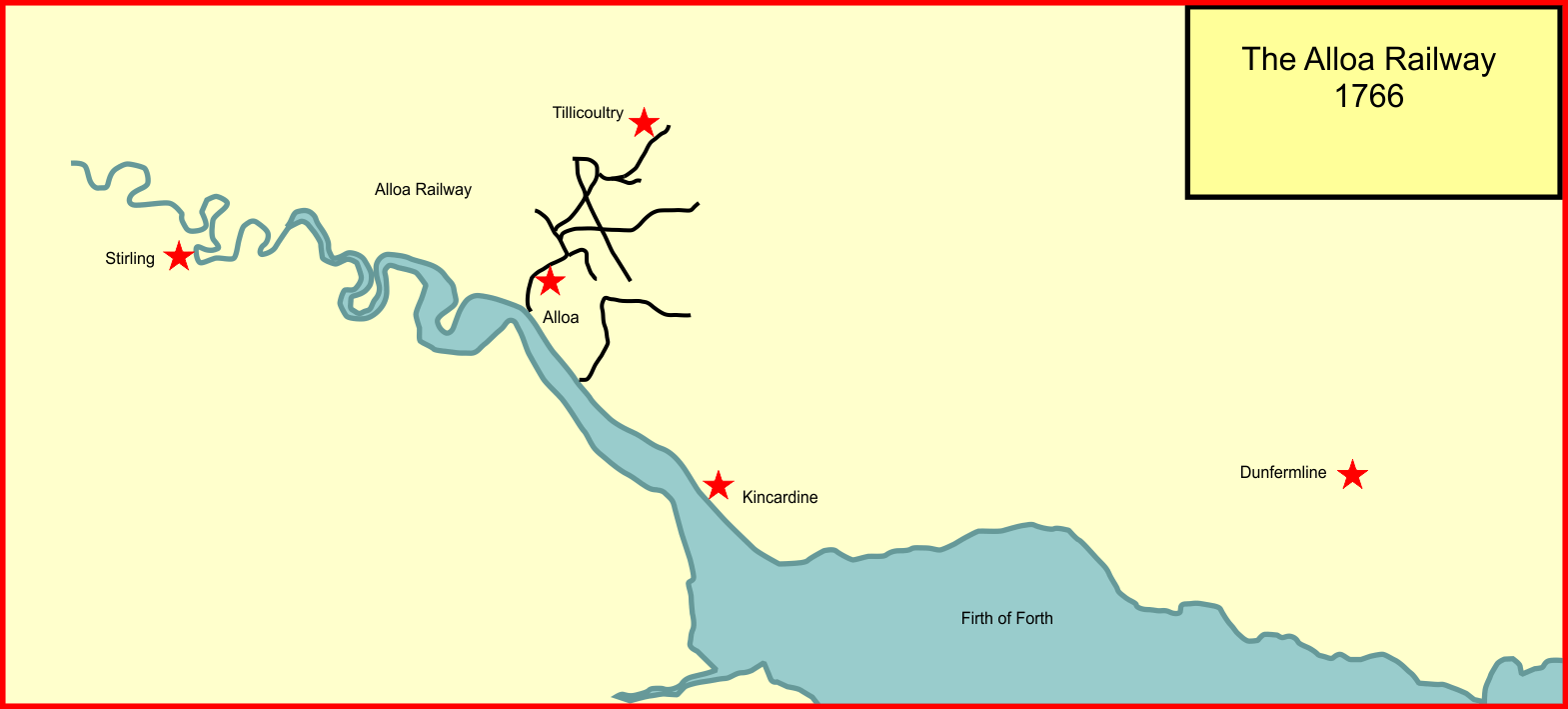
Alloa railway system, 1766

The Earls of Mar owned extensive lands in the hinterland of Alloa, and for some centuries coal had been produced from pits on the estate. An extensive system of waggonways, initially wooden railed, later wood with iron facings, was installed from about 1768 to move the coal, using horsepower and gravity, from the pits downhill to the Forth.

=== A frenzy of railway authorisation ===
In 1842 the Edinburgh and Glasgow Railway (E&GR) opened its main line, and intercity railway travel was possible in Scotland. The line was immediately profitable, and showed that an inter-city railway could be a commercial success. The English railway network was growing in density and thoughts now turned, not merely towards connecting to the English system, but to the formation of a Scottish network too.

The easy availability of money resulted in a very considerable number of Scottish lines being proposed in the following years, and in the 1845 parliamentary session many were authorised. Among them were the Edinburgh, Perth and Dundee Railway, planned to cross Fife from a ferry pier at Burntisland to Perth, and to a ferry pier on the Tay opposite Broughty Ferry. Also authorised was the North British Railway (to build from Edinburgh to Berwick, and the Scottish Central Railway, to build from the Edinburgh and Glasgow line near Castlecary to Perth, and the Caledonian Railway, to build from Glasgow and Edinburgh to Carlisle.

The fragmented nature of these authorisations resulted in an immediate search for alliances, and even before much construction had taken place, some companies' boards thought it essential to seek to control as much territory as possible, by friendly alliance or by takeover. Many of these alliances were quickly agreed, and in many cases without much strategic thought.

=== Authorisation of the S&DR ===
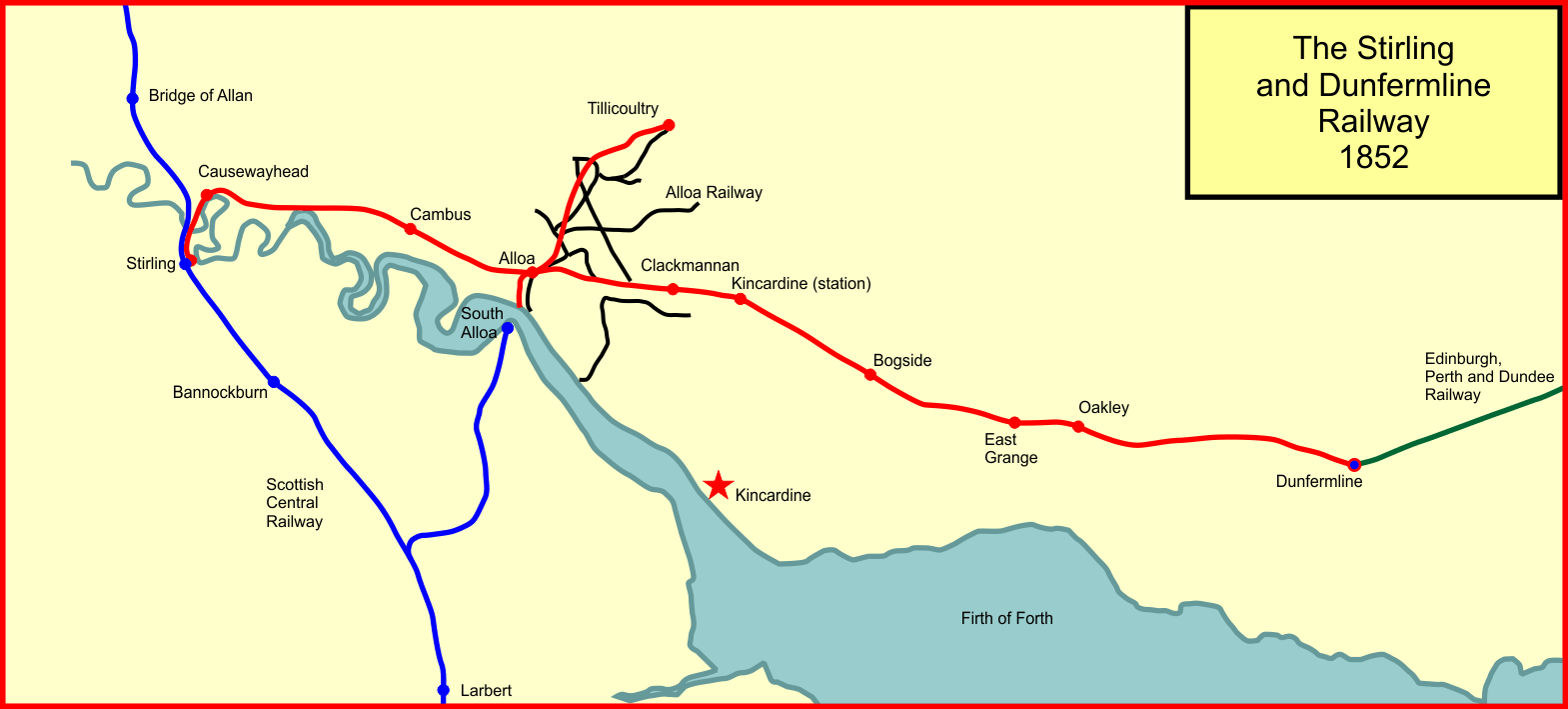
The Stirling and Dunfermline Railway system in 1852

The Edinburgh, Perth and Dundee Railway (successor to the Edinburgh and Northern Railway) was authorised to make a branch from Thornton (near present-day Glenrothes) to Dunfermline. Dunfermline was an ancient seat of government and industry, but it was the minerals, especially coal, in the area which encouraged the building of a line. The Edinburgh and Glasgow Railway too saw that potential, and promoted a nominally independent company, the Stirling and Dunfermline Railway, which would capture the Alloa coalfield and develop other mineral locations at Dunfermline and elsewhere on the line of route

The Edinburgh and Glasgow Railway sought to expand northwards and formed an alliance with the Scottish Central Railway (SCR), and submitted a parliamentary bill for the 1846 session for a Stirling and Dunfermline Railway. As well as opening up a considerable area of agricultural land, the line would give the E&GR access to areas of mineral extraction along the line of route, and beyond Dunfermline as well. Coal was the dominant mineral, but some blackband ironstone was being extracted and limestone was being fired on the northern shore of the Forth. A special meeting of E&GR shareholders was held on 12 May 1846 to give approval to the merger and the promotion of the Stirling and Dunfermline line. A 35-year lease contract had been agreed, paying 4% rent on the construction cost of the S&D after 35% of receipts for operating expenses.

Stirling and Dunfermline Railway Act 1846
- Act of Parliament
- Parliament of the United Kingdom
- Long title: An Act for making a Railway from Stirling to Dunfermline, with Branches to Tillicoultry and to Alloa Harbour, to be called "The Stirling and Dunfermline Railway."
- Citation: 9 & 10 Vict. c. ccii

Dates
- Royal assent: 16 July 1846

Stirling and Dunfermline Railway (Amendment and Deviations) Act 1848
- Act of Parliament
- Parliament of the United Kingdom
- Long title: An Act to authorize certain Deviations in the Main Line of the Stirling and Dunfermline Railway, and for other Purposes.
- Citation: 11 & 12 Vict. c. cxxvii

Dates
- Royal assent: 14 August 1848

Text of statute as originally enacted

The Stirling and Dunfermline Railway Act 1846 (9 & 10 Vict. c. ccii) received royal assent on 16 July 1846. As well as the main line between the places in the name, branches were authorised to Tillicoultry and to Alloa Harbour. The authorised capital for over 24 miles of railway was £390,000. In 1847 and again in the Stirling and Dunfermline Railway (Amendment and Deviations) Act 1848 (11 & 12 Vict. c. cxxvii) a number of diversions of the route, and of local tramways, were authorised.

The planned merger of the E&GR and the SCR "on equal terms" would give the E&GR the necessary access to Stirling; however during 1847 the Scottish Central reconsidered its alliance, and it decided that the Caledonian Railway, with which it was to connect near Castlecary, would be a better partner, and it rejected the intended link with the E&GR. Suddenly the E&GR found that it had no railway link to the S&DR, and the S&DR found itself isolated.

=== Opening ===
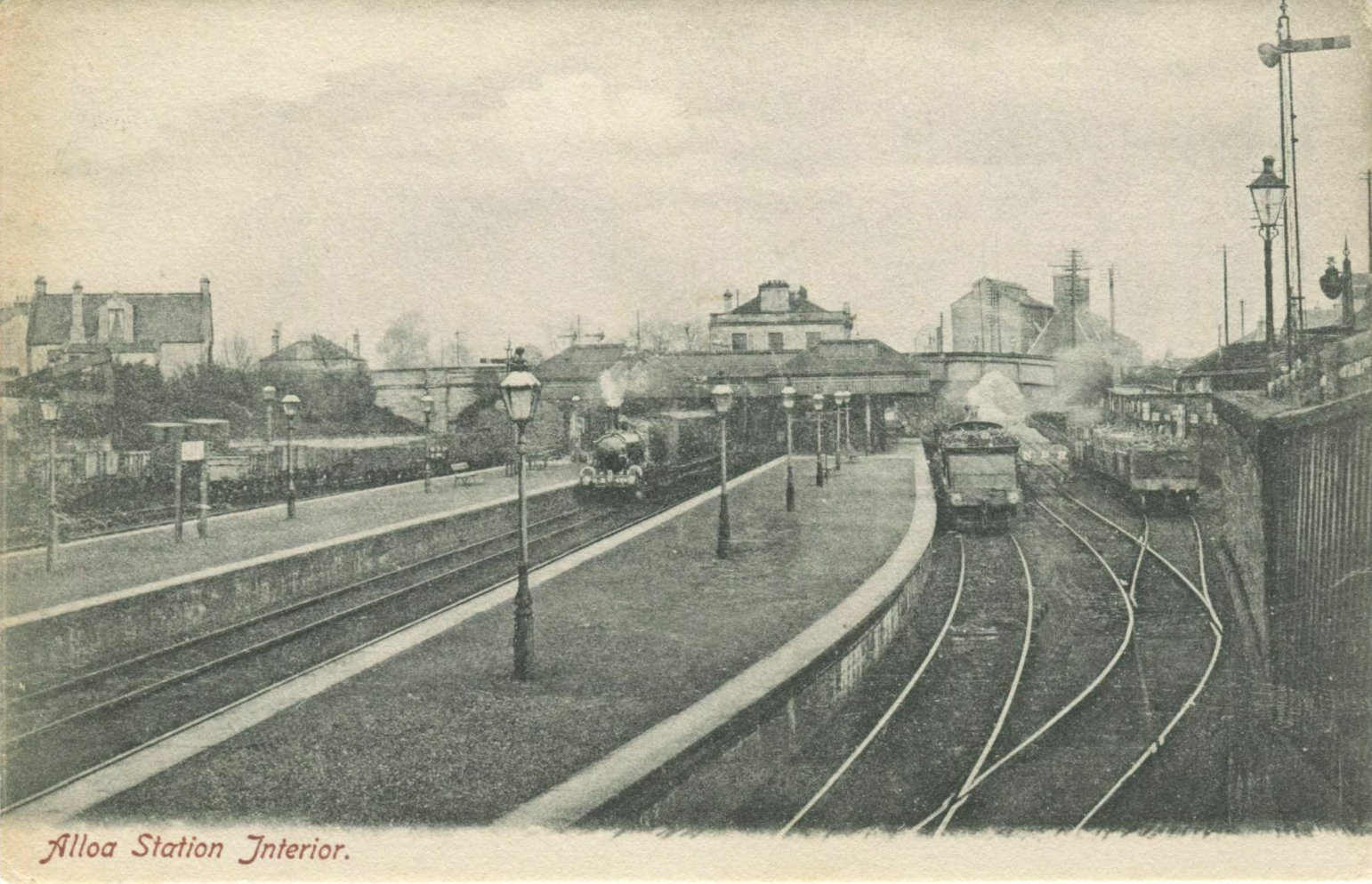
Alloa railway station

A line from Dunfermline to Charlestown Harbour was already in existence, and the S&DR line was constructed from east to west, taking advantage of the facility. The first section, from Dunfermline to Oakley, opened on 13 December 1849. There were ironstone and coal deposits at Oakley, and in 1845 the Forth Iron Works started construction of its plant there. It began production the following year.

Stirling and Dunfermline Railway (Deviation, Extension of Time and Amendment) Act 1849
- Act of Parliament
- Parliament of the United Kingdom
- Long title: An Act to authorize a Deviation of the Branch Line of the Stirling and Dunfermline Railway to Alloa Harbour, and the Diversion of certain Works; to extend the Time for the compulsory Purchase of certain Lands; and for other Purposes.
- Citation: 12 & 13 Vict. c. lxxxvi

Dates
- Royal assent: 1 August 1849

Text of statute as originally enacted

The line was extended to Alloa on 28 August 1850. On 3 June 1851 a branch to Alloa Harbour, authorised by the Stirling and Dunfermline Railway (Deviation, Extension of Time and Amendment) Act 1849 (12 & 13 Vict. c. lxxxvi), already connected to the Alloa Railway, was opened, together with the Tillicoultry branch. In addition a passenger station was opened at the harbour; it was named Alloa Ferry, opening the same day. There was a long established ferry service crossing the Forth at this point, and the Scottish Central Railway had opened a branch from its main line to South Alloa, meeting the ferry on the south side, on 12 September 1850.Thomas & Paterson (1984)

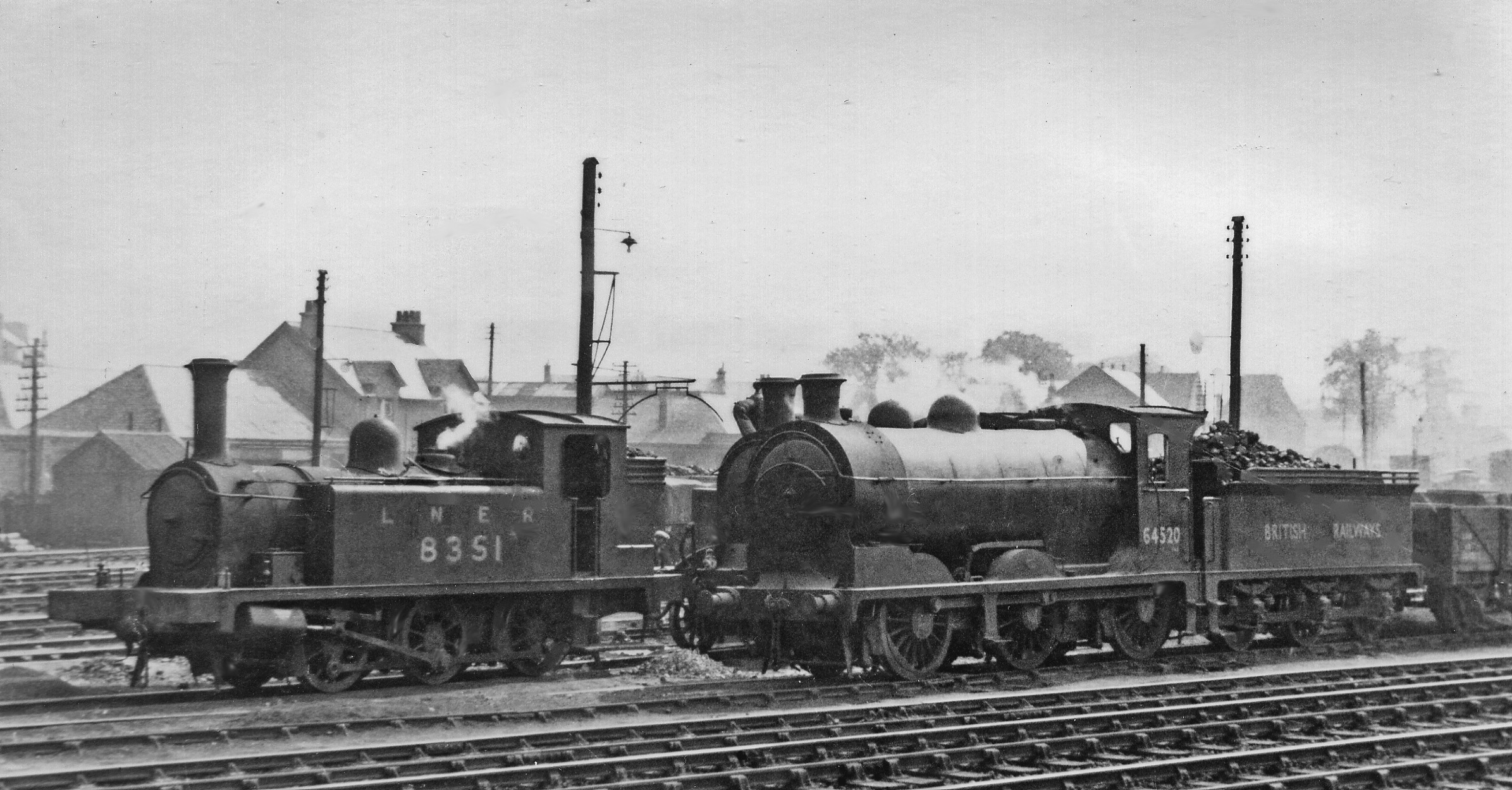
Locomotives in the yard at Stirling in 1948

The Tillicoultry branch had been delayed because of difficulties in constructing a bridge over the River Devon at Glenfoot. Although the final section to Stirling was relatively short, the opening of that part of the line was much delayed by a dispute. The Stirling and Dunfermline Railway Company had never intended to operate the line itself, and had contracted with its sponsor, the Edinburgh and Glasgow Railway, that the latter would lease the line and operate it on its completion. Since that time the E&GR had failed to acquire the Scottish Central Railway, which lay between the two lines, and the SCR had become hostile. The E&GR had other priorities and now saw that operating a remote section of line would be a considerable liability, and it declined to do so.

The Edinburgh and Glasgow Railway had undertaken to lease and work the line on the assumption of merging with the Scottish Central Railway, but this arrangement had fallen through. As the day of opening of the S&DR approached, it became obvious that the E&GR intended to evade its obligations to lease and work the line. On 6 April 1849 the Engineer Miller issued a certificate that the line was complete (to Oakley) but the E&GR declined to lease it as had been agreed. Faced with legal action to force compliance, the E&GR used the letter of the contract it had made with the S&DR, insisting on completion of the S&DR as authorised, and declining to accept any deviation at Stirling to accommodate a connection with the SCR. (The SCR was prepared to accept the S&DR crossing the Forth at Stirling on its bridge there, and using their station, but the E&GR insisted on separate facilities being provided. Nonetheless "Dunfermline Line Junction" at Stirling was a recognised location south of Stirling station into the 1970s.)

The S&DR had not the resources to operate the line itself and applied for legal sanction to oblige the E&GR to comply with its obligation, and the E&GR used every device to avoid compliance. In particular in demanded that the S&DR build an independent line crossing the Forth at Stirling, and station facilities there (in accordance with the original act of Parliament), even though the SCR had indicated that it was prepared to allow the SCR to use its bridge and terminal. Eventually on 1 July 1852 the line was opened throughout to Stirling. The passenger service at Alloa Ferry was closed on the same day, having been little used. A connection between the S&DR and the SCR lines was soon made south of the river at Stirling and the unnecessary S&DR terminal station fell into disuse.

Even now the E&GR refused to operate the line, and the S&DR had to acquire three locomotives and the rolling stock to do so itself. (Note: Marshall (1998) states that the Edinburgh and Northern Railway and the SCR together worked the line; it is likely that this is correct, but that they made their willingness conditional on the S&DR actually procuring the locomotives.)

Nonetheless the railway was open, and a normal train service was in operation.

=== Company takeovers ===
Edinburgh and Glasgow and Stirling and Dunfermline Railways Act 1858
- Act of Parliament
- Parliament of the United Kingdom
- Long title: An Act to vest the Stirling and Dunfermline Railway in the Edinburgh and Glasgow Railway Company, and for other Purposes.
- Citation: 21 & 22 Vict. c. lxiv

Dates
- Royal assent: 28 June 1858

The Stirling and Dunfermline Railway Company was vested in the Edinburgh and Glasgow Railway (E&GR) by the Edinburgh and Glasgow and Stirling and Dunfermline Railways Act 1858 (21 & 22 Vict. c. lxiv) of 28 July 1858. The E&GR was already a significant player: it opened its main line in 1842. Having started as an inter-city line the E&GR had been collaborating with the Monkland Railways and others in handling coal and iron in the west of Scotland, which became a dominant traffic. Now it had access to Dunfermline, and the west Fife coalfield. The E&GR itself was taken over by the North British Railway (NBR) on 1 August 1865.

The Scottish Central Railway was absorbed by the Caledonian Railway in 1865.

=== The Alva Railway ===
Alva was a significant manufacturing town, especially of woollens and textiles, located north of the Stirling and Dunfermline Railway, under the Ochil hills. The Alva Railway was incorporated by the Alva Railway Act 1861 (24 & 25 Vict. c. cxcv) on 22 July 1861; it was to be a 3.5 miles (5.6 km) branch to Alva from Cambus on the S&DR main line, with an intermediate station at Menstrie. It opened on 11 June 1863. (Note: Thomas & Turnock (1989) says 3 June.) There was an important distillery at Glenochil, near Menstrie.

The Alva Railway merged with the E&GR by the Edinburgh and Glasgow and Alva Railways Amalgamation Act 1864 (27 & 28 Vict. c. lxxxi) of 23 June 1864, with effect from 31 July 1864. The line had a busy passenger service, nine daily departures in 1922 and 10 in 1949 with a late Saturdays-only service from Alloa to Alva and back.

The Alva branch closed to passenger trains on 1 November 1954, but a general goods service continued until 1964, with company trains to Menstrie continuing until January 1965.

=== Alloa docks enlarged ===
In 1875, the NBR agreed to provide new sidings to the newly enlarged Alloa docks, but complications with the adaptation of the Alloa Coal Company's high level tramway delayed their connection for two years.

=== The railway across the Forth ===
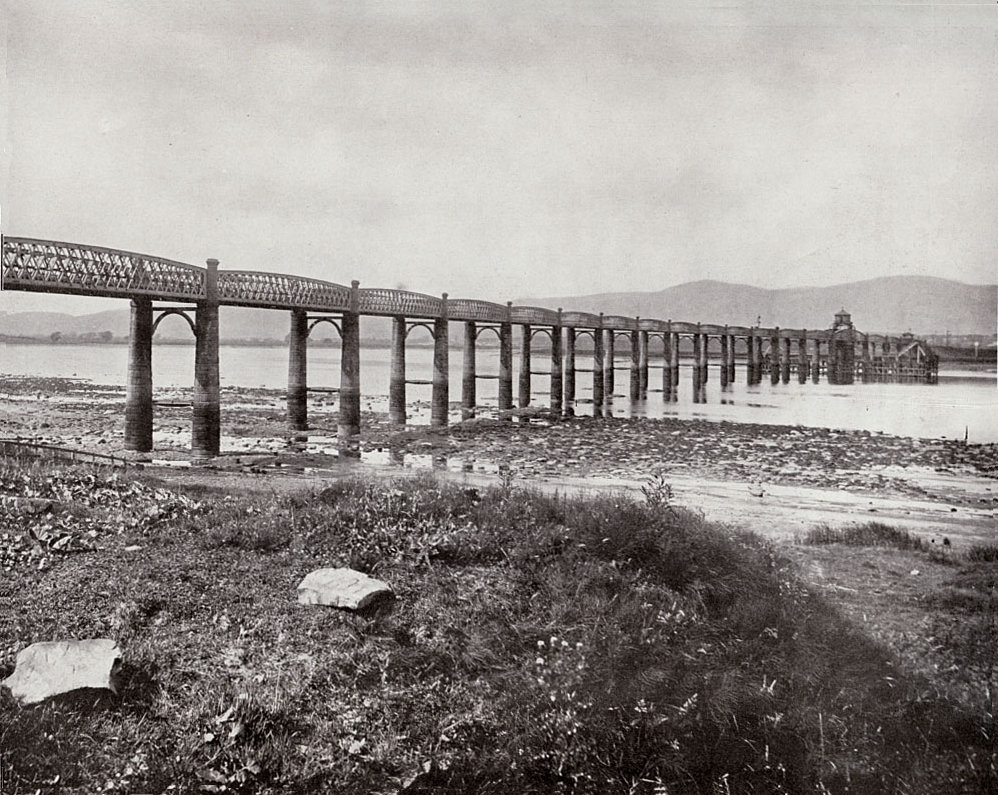
Alloa Viaduct and Swing Bridge

The Alloa Railway was built to connect Alloa to the south via a bridge over the River Forth. The company authorised to do this was acquired by the Caledonian Railway before it opened the line in 1885. The line was connected to the North British Railway and used their station in Alloa.

=== The Devon Valley Railway ===
Proposals to link Stirling and Kinross through Tillicoultry had been formulated early in the history of railways in the region, and when the Tillicoultry branch of the Stirling and Dunfermline Railway was authorised, promoters planned a railway from Tillicoultry to Kinross. As such it would complete a line from the Clyde to the Tay. This became the Devon Valley Railway which was authorised by the Devon Valley Railway Act 1858 (21 & 22 Vict. c. cxxii) on 23 July 1858, but although parts of the line were quickly completed, difficult conditions in the central section meant that it was not until 1 May 1879 that it opened throughout. It was absorbed by the North British Railway on 29 June 1875.

=== The Kincardine line ===
The Caledonian Railway was constantly trying to penetrate the Fife area to get access to east coast harbours and the coalfields. In an attempt to forestall one such scheme, the North British Railway itself obtained authorisation for a coastal line from Alloa through Clackmannan to Kincardine. It opened on 18 December 1893, and was extended to Dunfermline on 30 June 1906.

== Passenger services, 1895 ==
In an 1895 edition of Bradshaw, there were 12 westbound and 11 eastbound trains between Stirling and Dunfermline, as well as some short working between Alloa and Stirling. Some trains omitted all or most stops between Dunfermline and Alloa. Nine trains left Alloa for Tillicoultry and beyond, and six left Alloa for Larbert. The Alva branch had 12 round trips, most of them continuing from Cambus to Alloa.

Five trains, six on Saturdays, left Alloa for Kincardine. None of these services operated on Sundays.

== Closure ==
In the period following 1950 the increased use of road transport for passenger and goods led to a steep decline in the use of the lines, and passenger trains on the Alva branch ceased to run from 1 November 1954. A limited service to Menstrie continued until complete closure on 2 March 1964.

The S&DR Tillicoultry branch, by then regarded as part of the Devon Valley line, closed to passengers on 15 June 1964 and to goods traffic on 25 June 1973.

NBR route passenger trains over the Alloa Viaduct were withdrawn from 29 January 1968, (Note: 16 March according to Thomas & Paterson (1984), pp. 85–86.) and through goods train operation ceased in May 1968. A limited goods service to supply coal to the stationary steam engine that operated the Forth Swing Bridge from Alloa continued until May 1970.

Passenger services on the Stirling to Dunfermline main line were closed on 7 October 1968; through goods services were closed on 10 October 1979. West of Dunfermline, the line through Dunfermline Upper station served Oakley Colliery until 1986 when the pit closed. The line remained in place as far as Oakley until 1993, but was subsequently majority of the route has become cycle paths in 1999 as National Route 764. Shortly afterwards, studies began for the reopening of the western end of the line from Stirling to Alloa, as part of the Stirling-Alloa-Kincardine rail link.

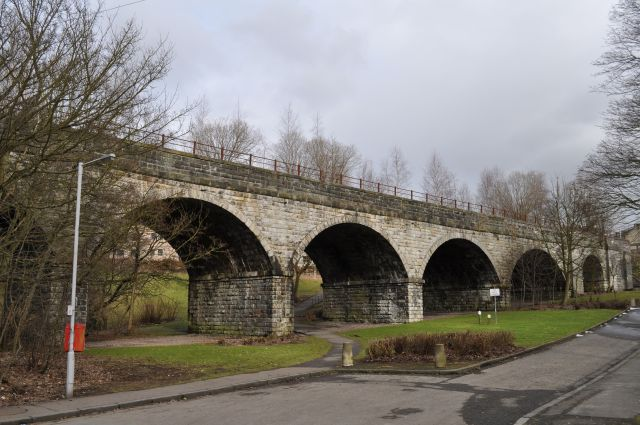
Railway viaduct in Dunfermline

== Partial reopening ==
Under Scottish Executive funding and to relieve congestion on the Forth Railway Bridge the line between Stirling and Alloa was reopened in 2008.

After only providing an hourly passenger service on the Alloa to Stirling section in 2015, as of the timetable changes in April 2024, this has been improved to a half-hourly service.

== Route ==
Location	Opened	Closed	Notes
Main line
Stirling to Dunfermline: opened Dunfermline to Oakley to mineral trains 13 December 1849; opened Dunfermline to Alloa 28 August 1850; closed to passengers 7 October 1968.
Stirling			Scottish Central Railway station
Causewayhead	1 July 1852; 2 June 1919	1 January 1917; 4 July 1955	
Blackgrange	1852	1852	
Cambus	1 July 1852	7 October 1968	trailing junction of Alva branch
Alloa West Junction			trailing junction of line from Alloa Bridge; (Note: Stansfield (1998), p. 34 (Fife's Lost Railways) but not in Stansfield (2002) (Stirling and Clackmannanshire's Lost Railways), Stansfield gives an Alloa Junction station, closed in November 1865; this may be confusion with the Scottish Central Railway Alloa Junction station on its main line between Larbert and Stirling.)
Alloa	28 August 1850; 19 May 2008	7 October 1968	facing junction to Tillicoultry
Kincardine Junction			facing junction to Kincardine
Clackmannan	28 August 1850; 2 June 1919	1 January 1917; 1 December 1921	renamed Clackmannan Road 1893
Kincardine	28 August 1850	22 September 1930	renamed Forest Mill 1893 when new line through Kincardine opened
Bogside	28 August 1850	15 September 1958	
East Grange	28 August 1850	15 September 1958	
Oakley	28 August 1850	7 October 1968	
Whitemyre Junction			trailing junction of West of Fife Mineral Railway
Dunfermline	13 December 1849 (by E&NR)	7 October 1968	end-on junction with the Edinburgh and Northern Railway (E&NR) branch; renamed Dunfermline Upper 1890
Tillicoultry branch
Opened 3 June 1851; closed to passengers 15 June 1964 and to goods 25 June 1973.
Alloa	see above		
Sauchie	3 June 1851	15 June 1964	
Glenfoot	3 June 1851	Jan. or Feb. 1852	temporary terminus; replaced by Tillicoultry
Tillicoultry	Jan. or Feb. 1852	15 June 1964	
Alloa Harbour branch and to Alloa Ferry
Opened 3 June 1851; closed May 1970.
Alloa	see above		
Alloa Ferry	3 June 1851	1 October 1885	remained open for goods
Alloa Bridge Branch
Opened 1 October 1885; closed to passengers 29 January 1968.
Alloa	see above		
Longcarse Junction			convergence of Caledonian Railway line from Alloa North (Caledonian)
Alloa Bridge	? 1 March 1921	17 August 1920	
Dunmore Junction			convergence with former South Alloa branch
Alva Railway
Opened 11 June 1863.
Cambus	see above		
Menstrie	3 June 1863	1 November 1954	renamed Menstrie and Glenochil 1954
Alva	3 June 1863	1 November 1954	

== Bibliography ==
- Awdry, Christopher (1990). Encyclopaedia of British Railway Companies. Sparkford: Patrick Stephens Ltd. ISBN 1-8526-0049-7. OCLC 19514063. CN 8983.
- Bruce, William Scott (1980). The Railways of Fife. Edinburgh: The Melven Press. ISBN 0-906664-03-9.
- Carter, E. F. (1959). An Historical Geography of the Railways of the British Isles. London: Cassell.
- Cobb, M. H. (2003). The Railways of Great Britain – A Historical Atlas. Shepperton: Ian Allan Publishing. ISBN 07110 3003 0.
- Thomas, John; Paterson, A. J. S. (1984). A Regional History of the Railways of Great Britain. Vol. VI Scotland: The Lowlands and the Borders (2nd ed.). Newton Abbott, Devon: David & Charles. ISBN 0-9465-3712-7. OCLC 12521072.
- Thomas, John; Turnock, David (1989). A Regional History of the Railways of Great Britain. Vol. 15 The North of Scotland (1st ed.). Newton Abbott, Devon: David & Charles. pp. 30–32, 311–312. ISBN 0-946537-03-8.
- Marshall, Peter (1998). The Scottish Central Railway: Perth to Stirling. Usk: Oakwood Press. ISBN 0-8536-1522-5.
- Quick, Michael E. (2002). Railway Passenger Stations in England Scotland and Wales—A Chronology. The Railway and Canal Historical Society.
- Quick, Michael E. (2013). Railway Passenger Stations in Great Britain: Third Supplement. The Railway and Canal Historical Society.
- Ross, David (2014). The North British Railway: A History. Catrine: Stenlake Publishing. ISBN 978 1 84033 647 4.
- Stansfield, Gordon (1998). Fife's Lost Railways. Catrine: Stenlake Publishing. ISBN 1 84033 055 4.
- Stansfield, Gordon (2002). Stirlingshire and Clackmannanshire's Lost Railways. Catrine: Stenlake Publishing. ISBN 1 84033 184 4.
