= 1961 New Year Honours =

British royal recognitions

The New Year Honours 1961 were appointments by many of the Commonwealth realms of Queen Elizabeth II to various orders and honours to reward and highlight good works by citizens of those countries. They were announced on 31 December 1960 in the United Kingdom, Australia, New Zealand, Nigeria, and Rhodesia and Nyasaland to celebrate the year passed and mark the beginning of 1961.

At this time honours for Australians were awarded both in the United Kingdom honours, on the advice of the premiers of Australian states, and also in a separate Australia honours list.

The recipients of honours are displayed here as they were styled before their new honour, and arranged by honour, with classes (Knight, Knight Grand Cross, etc.) and then divisions (Military, Civil, etc.) as appropriate.

== United Kingdom and Commonwealth ==
=== Baron ===
- Sir Alexander Fleck, KBE. For public services. Chairman, Advisory Council on Research and Development, Ministry of Power, and of the Nuclear Safety Advisory Committee.

=== Life Baron ===
- The Right Honourable Thomas Williams, Labour Member of Parliament for the Don Valley Division, 1922–1959; Joint Parliamentary Secretary, Ministry of Agriculture and Fisheries, 1940–1945; Minister of Agriculture and Fisheries, 1945–1951. For political and public services.

=== Privy Councillor ===
- Sir Jocelyn Edward Salis Simon, QC, MP, Member of Parliament for Middlesbrough West since 1951; Joint Parliamentary Under-secretary of State, Home Office, 1957–1958, and Financial Secretary to HM Treasury, 1958–1959; Solicitor-General since October 1959.

=== Baronet ===
- Sir James Bowman, KBE, JP, Chairman, National Coal Board since 1956.
- Hugh Fraser, JP, DL, Chairman and Managing Director, House of Fraser, Ltd. For public and charitable services.

=== Knight Bachelor ===
- Colonel Robert Philip Wyndham Adeane, OBE, JP. For services to the Tate Gallery.
- William Picken Alexander, General Secretary, Association of Education Committees.
- Christopher Howard Andrewes, MD, FRCP, Deputy Director, National Institute for Medical Research.
- Gerald Clayton Beadle, CBE, Director, Television Broadcasting, British Broadcasting Corporation.
- Colonel Tufton Victor Hamilton Beamish, MC, MP, Member of Parliament for Lewes since 1945. For political and public services.
- George Edward Beharrell, Chairman, Dunlop Rubber Co. Ltd.
- Robert Henderson Blundell, Chief Metropolitan Magistrate.
- Alderman John Charles Burman, JP. For political and public services in Birmingham.
- Cecil Dannatt, OBE, MC, Vice-Chairman, Associated Electrical Industries, Ltd.
- Lieutenant-Colonel Walter Henry Bromley-Davenport, TD, DL, MP, Member of Parliament for Knutsford since 1945; a Conservative Whip, 1948–1951. For political and public services.
- William Tyrone Guthrie. For services to the Theatre.
- William Ogden Hart, CMG, Clerk of the London County Council.
- George Gordon Honeyman, CBE, QC, JP. For services to Industrial Arbitration.
- William Angus Boyd Iliff, CMG, MBE, Vice-President of the International Bank for Reconstruction and Development.
- Barnett Janner, MP, President of the Board of Deputies of British Jews.
- Arthur John Kelly, CBE, Secretary to the Cabinet, Northern Ireland.
- Edward Roberts Lewis, Chairman, The Decca Navigator Co. Ltd., and Decca Radar, Ltd.
- Thomas Frederick Lister, CBE. For services to the British Legion.
- Alfred Charles Bernard Lovell, OBE, Professor of Radio Astronomy, University of Manchester; Director, Jodrell Bank Experimental Station.
- Dan Hurdis Mason, OBE, ERD. For political and public services in South-East England and London.
- Robert Alistair Murray, OBE. For political and public services in Glasgow.
- Reginald Northam, CBE. For political services.
- Kenneth Raymond Pelly, MC, Chairman, Lloyd's Register of Shipping.
- Alderman Hubert Percival Lancaster Pitman, OBE, lately Sheriff of the City of London.
- John Neish Ritchie, CB, FRCVS, Chief Veterinary Officer, Ministry of Agriculture, Fisheries and Food.
- Alexander Robertson, DCM, Deputy Commissioner, Metropolitan Police.
- Ivo Herbert Evelyn Joseph Stourton, CMG, OBE, Inspector General of Colonial Police.
- Claud Humphrey Meredith Waldock, CMG, OBE, QC, Chichele Professor of Public International Law, University of Oxford.
- Jack Allan Westrup, Heather Professor of Music, University of Oxford.
- Alan Herries Wilson, a Deputy Chairman and Managing Director, Courtaulds, Ltd.
- Brian Wellingham Windeyer, MB, FRCS, Professor of Radiology, University of London; Dean of Middlesex Hospital Medical School.

State of Victoria

- The Honourable John Vincent William Barry, a Judge of the Supreme Court of the State of Victoria.
- The Honourable Ewen Paul Cameron, Minister of Health, State of Victoria.

State of Queensland

- The Honourable James Alfred Heading, CMG, DCM, MM, formerly Minister for Public Works and Local Government, State of Queensland.

State of South Australia

- William Poole Bishop, CMG, formerly Auditor General, State of South Australia.

State of Western Australia

- Hugh Lancelot Brisbane, MBE, of Perth in the State of Western Australia. For public services, particularly in connection with industrial development.

Southern Rhodesia

- The Honourable Thomas Hugh William Beadle, CMG, OBE, a Judge of the High Court of Southern Rhodesia.

Commonwealth Relations

- Alexander Oppenheim, OBE, Vice-Chancellor, University of Malaya.

Overseas Territories

- Walter Fleming Coutts, CMG, MBE, Chief Secretary, Kenya.
- Geoffrey Campbell Gunter, CBE. For public services in Jamaica.
- Albert George Lowe, Chief Justice, Fiji.
- Philip James Rogers, CBE. For public services in Kenya.
- Kenneth Sievewright Stoby, Chief Justice, Barbados.
- Arthur Edwin Trotman, CMG, lately Minister for Natural Resources, Tanganyika.
- Arthur Norman Wolffsohn, Speaker of the Legislative Assembly, British Honduras.

=== Order of the Bath ===
==== Knight Grand Cross of the Order of the Bath (GCB) ====
Military Division

- General Sir James Cassels, KBE, CB, DSO, ADC (Gen), (36316), late Infantry; Colonel, The Seaforth Highlanders; Colonel Commandant, Corps of Royal Military Police and Gurkha Military Police.
- Air Chief Marshal Sir Thomas Geoffrey Pike, KCB, CBE, DFC, Royal Air Force.

==== Knight Commander of the Order of the Bath (KCB) ====
Military Division

Royal Navy

- Vice-Admiral Laurence George Durlacher, CB, OBE, DSC.
- Vice-Admiral Sir St John Reginald Joseph Tyrwhitt, Bt, CB, DSO, DSC.

Army

- Lieutenant-General John D'Arcy Anderson, CB, CBE, DSO, (42399), late Royal Armoured Corps.
- Lieutenant-General William Gurdon Stirling, CB, CBE, DSO, (36888), late Royal Regiment of Artillery.

Royal Air Force

- Air Marshal Samuel Charles Elworthy, CB, CBE, DSO, MVO, DFC, AFC.
- Acting Air Marshal Anthony Dunkerton Selway, CB, DFC.

Civil Division

- Sir Richard Royle Powell, KBE, CB, CMG, Permanent Secretary, Board of Trade.
- Richard George Kitchener Way, CB, CBE, JP, Permanent Under-Secretary of State, War Office.

==== Companion of the Order of the Bath (CB) ====
Military Division

Royal Navy

- Major-General Malcolm Cartwright Cartwright-Taylor, Royal Marines.
- Rear-Admiral Norman Egbert Denning, OBE.
- Rear-Admiral Henry Charles Hogger, DSC.
- Rear-Admiral Christopher Haynes Hutchinson, DSO, OBE.
- Surgeon Rear-Admiral William Percival Edwin McIntyre, QHP, MD, BCh.
- Surgeon Rear-Admiral George Phillips, QHS, MB, BCh.
- Rear-Admiral Ronald Etridge Portlock, OBE.
- Rear-Admiral Philip Frederick Powlett, DSO, DSC.
- Rear-Admiral Richard Michael Smeeton, MBE.
- Rear-Admiral Richard Everley Washbourn, DSO, OBE.

Army

- Major-General Richard Hutchison Batten, CBE, DSO, (41082), late Infantry.
- Major-General Cecil Martin Fothergill Deakin, CBE, (49812), late Foot Guards.
- Major-General Christopher Earle Welby-Everard, OBE, (52445), late Infantry.
- Major-General Adrian Price Webley Hope, CBE, (49876), late Infantry.
- Major-General Harold Edwin Knott, OBE, MD, QHP, (41299), late Royal Army Medical Corps.
- Major-General Christopher Godfrey Lipscomb, DSO, (39345), late Infantry.
- Major-General Denis Walter Price, CBE, (41204), late Corps of Royal Engineers.
- Major-General Charles Herbert Tarver, CBE, DSO, (380334), late Infantry.

Royal Air Force

- Air Vice-Marshal Michael Harington Dwyer, CBE.
- Air Vice-Marshal Glen Albyn Martin Knight, CBE, QHS, MB, BS.
- Acting Air Vice-Marshal Edward Lawrence Colbeck-Welch, OBE, DFC.
- Air Commodore Frederick Ernest Rosier, CBE, DSO.
- Air Commodore Roland George Seymour, CBE.
- Air Commodore Denis Frank Spotswood, CBE, DSO, DFC, ADC.
- Acting Air Commodore Alan Pyke, OBE.

Civil Division

- Leslie Ripley Bradley, CBE, lately Director-General, Curator and Secretary, Imperial War Museum.
- Charles Douglas Campbell, Under-secretary, Board of Trade.
- Colonel David Carnegie, OBE, TD, DL, lately Chairman, County of the City of Glasgow Territorial and Auxiliary Forces Association.
- Frederick Noel Charlton, CBE, Principal Assistant Solicitor, Office of HM Procurator-General and Treasury Solicitor.
- Thomas George Barnett Cocks, OBE, Clerk Assistant, House of Commons.
- Lieutenant-Colonel Malcolm Edward Durant Gumming, OBE. Attached War Office.
- Edward Harold Gwynn, Assistant Under-secretary of State, Home Office.
- Ivor Edward King, CBE, Director of Dockyards, Admiralty.
- Reep Lintern, Under-Secretary, Ministry of Transport.
- William Henry Long, Permanent Secretary, Ministry of Agriculture, Northern Ireland.
- John Archibald Campbell Robertson, Under-Secretary, HM Treasury.
- Henry Anthony Sargeaunt, OBE, Deputy Chief Scientist (B), War Office.
- William Henry Stephens, Director-General of Ballistic Missiles, Ministry of Aviation.

=== Order of Saint Michael and Saint George ===
==== Knight Commander of the Order of St Michael and St George (KCMG) ====
- The Honourable Henry Seymour Baker, CMG, DSO, President of the Legislative Council, State of Tasmania, and Chancellor of the University of Tasmania.
- The Honourable Francis Edward Hovell-Thurlow-Cumming-Bruce, CMG, High Commissioner for the United Kingdom in New Zealand.
- The Right Honourable Antony Henry, Viscount Head, PC, CBE, MC, High Commissioner for the United Kingdom in the Federation of Nigeria.
- William Lethbridge Gorell Barnes, CB, CMG, Deputy Under-Secretary of State, Colonial Office.
- Sir Arthur George Rixson Mooring, CMG, British Resident, Zanzibar.
- Harold Beeley, CMG, CBE, Deputy United Kingdom Representative, United Kingdom Mission to the United Nations, New York.
- Malcolm Siborne Henderson, CMG, Her Majesty's Ambassador Extraordinary and Plenipotentiary in Montevideo.
- Archibald David Manisty Ross, CMG, Her Majesty's Ambassador Extraordinary and Plenipotentiary (designate) in Lisbon.

==== Companion of the Order of St Michael and St George (CMG) ====
- John Colburn Bennett, CBE, Joint Managing Director, Henry Gardner & Co. Ltd. For services as adviser to the Board of Trade.
- Frank Cooper, Assistant Secretary, Air Ministry.
- James Geddes Robertson, Assistant Secretary, Ministry of Labour.
- William Wallace, Assistant Comptroller, Board of Trade.
- Archibald Archer, of Indooroopilly, State of Queensland, in recognition of his contribution to the development of primary production in various spheres.
- Major-General William Henry Alexander Bishop, CB, OBE, Deputy High Commissioner for the United Kingdom, Calcutta.
- Eric William George Jarvis, Attorney General, Southern Rhodesia.
- Howard Huntley Shannon, a Member of the House of Assembly, State of South Australia.
- Robert Grainger Ker Thompson, DSO, MC, Secretary for Defence, Federation of Malaya.
- William Joseph Robinson Wilson, a prominent Grazier in the State of Victoria.
- Melvin George Billing, Provincial Commissioner, Northern Rhodesia.
- Christopher Powell-Cotton, MBE, MC, Provincial Commissioner, Uganda.
- Michael John Davies, OBE, Minister for Security and Immigration, Tanganyika.
- Bryan James Dudbridge, Minister for Provincial Affairs, Tanganyika.
- The Right Reverend Alfred Thomas Hill, MBE, Bishop of Melanesia, Western Pacific.
- George Charles Day Hodgson, MBE, Provincial Commissioner, Nyasaland.
- James Montieth Lloyd, Administrator, Grenada.
- Francis Alfred Loyd, OBE, Provincial Commissioner, Nyanza Province, Kenya.
- James Carnegie McPetrie, OBE, Legal Adviser, Colonial Office.
- Vincent Albert Maddison, Permanent Secretary, Ministry of Commerce and Industry, Kenya.
- William Frederick Searle, Chief Statistician, Colonial Office.
- Thomas Henry Glasse, MVO, MBE, lately Foreign Office.
- Morgan Charles Garnet Man, Counsellor, British Residency, Bahrain.
- Brigadier John Gerald Nicholson, CBE, Foreign Office.
- Harold Frederick Oxbury, Assistant Director-General, British Council.
- Lancelot Frank Lee Pyman, Her Majesty's Consul-General, Zagreb.
- John Vernon Rob, Her Majesty's Ambassador Extraordinary and Plenipotentiary to the Republic of Congo, the Gabon and Chad.
- Anthony Gerald Roderick Rouse, OBE, Counsellor (Information), Her Majesty's Embassy, Bonn.
- Kenneth John Simpson, Foreign Office.
- John Gabriel Tahourdin, Foreign Office.

=== Royal Victorian Order ===
==== Knight Commander of the Royal Victorian Order (KCVO) ====
- Denis John Browne, MB, FRCS.
- (Alan) Philip Hay, CVO, TD.
- Robert Somerville, CVO.

==== Commander of the Royal Victorian Order (CVO) ====
- Commander Colin Buist, MVO, Royal Navy (Retired).
- Lord Adam Granville Gordon, MBE.
- (James) Cecil Hogg, FRCS, LRCP.
- Group Captain Arthur Dennis Mitchell, DFC, AFC, ADC, Royal Air Force.
- David Charles Scott-Moncrieff.

==== Member of the Royal Victorian Order (MVO) ====
At this time the two lowest classes of the Royal Victorian Order were "Member (fourth class)" and "Member (fifth class)", both with post-nominal letters MVO. "Member (fourth class)" was renamed "Lieutenant" (LVO) from the 1985 New Year Honours onwards.

Fourth Class

- Commander Peter Egerton Capel Berger, DSC, Royal Navy.
- Lieutenant-Colonel William Dudley Coles, TD.
- Wing Commander Harry George Currell, DFC, AFC, Royal Air Force.
- Commander John Kenneth Herbert Freeman, Royal Navy.
- Ronald Corner Jones.
- Wing Commander David Wood, AFC, Royal Air Force.

Fifth Class

- Frank Victor Jelpké.
- Robert Ephraim Lambert.
- Stanley William Lionel Rivers Lucking.
- Arthur Charles Neal, BEM.

=== Order of the British Empire ===
==== Knight Grand Cross of the Order of the British Empire (GBE) ====
Military Division

- Air Chief Marshal the Right Honourable Percy Ronald Gardner, Earl of Bandon, KBE, CB, CVO, DSO, Royal Air Force.

Civil Division

- Sir Ellis Hunter, Chairman and Managing Director, Dorman Long & Co. Ltd.
- Sir William Henry Tucker Luce, KCMG, KBE, lately Governor and Commander-in-Chief, Aden.

==== Dame Commander of the Order of the British Empire (DBE) ====
Civil Division

- Kitty Anderson, Headmistress, North London Collegiate School.

==== Knight Commander of the Order of the British Empire (KBE) ====
Military Division

Royal Navy

- Vice-Admiral William Godfrey Crawford, CB, DSC.
- Vice-Admiral John Strike Lancaster, CB.

Army

- Major-General Peter St Clair-Ford, CB, CBE, DSO, (33686), late Infantry (now R.A.R.O).
- Major-General Leslie Norman Tyler, CB, OBE, (38480), Corps of Royal Electrical and Mechanical Engineers (now retired).

Royal Air Force

- Air Marshal Alfred Earle, CB, CBE.
- Air Marshal Henry Paterson Fraser, CB, CBE, AFC.

Civil Division

- Sir Arthur Morse, CBE. For services as Chairman, British Travel & Holidays Association.
- Captain Richard Antony Pilkington, MC, MP, Member of Parliament for Widnes, 1935–1945 and for Poole since 1951; Civil Lord of the Admiralty, 1942–1945. For political and public services.
- Sidney Donald Sargent, CB, Secretary, National Assistance Board.
- Alfred Henry Norris, OBE, British subject resident in Brazil.
- Edgeworth Beresford David, CMG, Administrator, East Africa High Commission.
- Sir Kenneth Kennedy O'Connor, MC, President, Court of Appeal for Eastern Africa.

==== Commander of the Order of the British Empire (CBE) ====
Military Division

Royal Navy

- Captain Maurice Linton Hardie, DSC, ADC.
- Captain Ronald Edward Hutchins, DSC.
- Instructor Captain Arthur Ernest Johnston.
- Helen Moore, RRC, QHNS, Queen Alexandra's Royal Naval Nursing Service.
- Captain William Richard Jeffries Redman, Royal Navy (Retired).
- Colonel Norman Charles Ries, OBE, Royal Marines (Retired).
- Captain Walter Augustus Stewart, OBE.
- Captain Richard Sidney Tufnell, VRD, Malayan Royal Naval Volunteer Reserve.

Army

- Colonel Ian Stuart Alderson (53616), late Royal Regiment of Artillery.
- Colonel Sidney Denis Calvert, OBE, (44838), late Corps of Royal Engineers.
- Brigadier Richard Arthur Cook (40366), late Royal Regiment of Artillery.
- The Reverend Herbert Lewis Owen Davies, MBE, QHC, Chaplain to the Forces, First Class (64061), Royal Army Chaplains' Department.
- Brigadier Arthur Henley Dowson, OBE, ADC, (40372), late Corps of Royal Engineers.
- Brigadier Clive Charlton Garthwaite, ADC, (44075), late Royal Regiment of Artillery.
- Brigadier (temporary) John Reid Holden, DSO, OBE, (71215), late Royal Armoured Corps.
- Colonel William Innes Moberly, OBE, (378025), late Royal Regiment of Artillery.
- Colonel Clifford Nixon, MBE, (62600), late Infantry.
- Colonel (Honorary Brigadier) Claude Charles Parkman, OBE, ERD, TD, (42451), Territorial Army.
- Brigadier (temporary) Hugh Anthony Prince (380188), late Infantry.
- Brigadier (temporary) Arthur Philip Trimble, MD, MRCP (Edin), (52780), late Royal Army Medical Corps.
- Colonel Alfred Arthur Warburton, DSO, (143830), Territorial Army.
- Brigadier Hamilton Edward Crosdill Weldon, OBE, (47650), late Royal Regiment of Artillery.
- Brigadier (temporary) William Davidson Tighe-Wood, MC, (100901), late Infantry.

Additional Commander
In recognition of distinguished service in Malaya for the period 1st January to 31st July 1960.

- Colonel Kenneth Charles Briant (366234), Corps of Royal Electrical and Mechanical Engineers.

Royal Air Force

- Acting Air Commodore Frank Hume.
- Acting Air Commodore Charles Hunting Simpson.
- Group Captain Clifford Cockcroft Barker, AFC, MB, ChB.
- Group Captain Arthur William Caswell, OBE.
- Group Captain William Dennis David, DFC, AFC.
- Group Captain Edwin William Townley Hardie.
- Group Captain William Derek Hodgkinson, DFC, AFC, ADC.
- Group Captain Edgar Norman Ryder, DFC, (Retired).
- Group Captain Carlton Lang Troop, (Retired).
- Group Captain Frank Andrew Willan, DFC.

Civil Division

- John Heward Arkell, Director of Administration, British Broadcasting Corporation.
- Brigadier Edward Henry Walford Backhouse, DL, lately Chairman, Territorial and Auxiliary Forces Association, County of Suffolk.
- Alderman John Barker, JP. For political and public services in Ilford.
- Thomas Ernest Chester Barratt, Chief Commoner, City of London.
- Horace John Baillie Bartlett, JP. For political and public services in Devon.
- Joseph Binns, Deputy Chairman, Public Works Loan Board.
- James Broatch, Director General, Cotton Board.
- Samuel Herbert Brookfield, Assistant Solicitor, Ministry of Housing and Local Government.
- Professor Robert Browning, Chairman, East Kilbride Development Corporation.
- Gerald Burdon, Engineer Surveyor-in-Chief, Marine Division, Ministry of Transport.
- Joseph William Francis Causton. For political and public services in Suffolk.
- Leonard Childs, OBE, JP, DL, Chairman, Great Ouse River Board.
- Joseph Reynolds Cobley. For services to the fishing industry and as adviser at conferences on the International Law of the Sea.
- William Hope Collins, Civil Defence Controller, Western Zone, Scotland.
- Harold Francis Collison, General Secretary, National Union of Agricultural Workers.
- Albert Edward Cooper. For services to the Northern Ireland Development Council.
- Reginald William Daniel, Controller for Wales, Board of Trade.
- Frederick John James Day, OBE, Director of Passport Control, Foreign Office.
- Alderman Cyril George Edward Dingle, JP, Mayor of Wallasey.
- Captain John Petter Dobson, DSC, RD, Commodore Master, Empress of Britain, Canadian Pacific Steamships, Ltd., London.
- The Reverend Hugh Osborne Douglas. For services relating to the celebration of the Quatercentenary of the Scottish Reformation.
- John Armitage Drake, JP. For political and public services in Halifax.
- Helena Evans, JP, Alderman, Cardiff City Borough Council.
- Victor Grayson Hardie Feather, Assistant General Secretary, Trades Union Congress
- Arthur George Field, OBE, Civil Defence Officer, Middlesex.
- Guy Clavell Inge Gardiner, Technical Director, De Havilland Aircraft Company Ltd.
- William Thomas Gemmell, Director, Midland Region, General Post Office.
- Lionel Ingersoll Gordon, OBE, Crown Agent, Edinburgh.
- Ronald Bramble Green, MB, FRCS, Emeritus Professor of Anatomy and lately Dean of Medicine, King's College, University of Durham.
- Sybil Vera Grenfell, MVO, Vice-President, National Association of Mixed Clubs and Girls' Clubs.
- John James Miller Hannah, Farmer, Ayrshire. For services to agriculture.
- Charles Herbert Stuart-Harris, MD, FRCP, Professor of Medicine, University of Sheffield.
- Nancy Hellon, Assistant Secretary, Ministry of Pensions and National Insurance.
- Stanley Hector Hamilton Hildersley, Senior Principal Inspector of Taxes, Board of Inland Revenue.
- Charles Holt, Managing Director, Thomas Cook & Son
- William Aylsham Bryan Hopkin, Deputy Director, Economic Section, HM Treasury.
- Ames Lyall Imrie, City Chamberlain, Edinburgh.
- Geoffrey Alan Jellicoe, Landscape Architect.
- David Dilwyn John, TD, Director, National Museum of Wales, Cardiff.
- Frederick Shepard Johnson, JP, Chairman and Joint Managing Director, Johnson Bros (Hanley), Ltd.
- Thomas Mervyn Jones, Chairman, Wales Gas Board.
- William Ernest Jones, OBE, lately President, National Union of Mineworkers.
- John Morton Scott Jupp, OBE, MC, Director of Audit, Exchequer and Audit Department.
- Archibald George Jury, Chief Architect and Director of Planning, City of Glasgow.
- Major Alexander Campbell White Knox, OBE, MC, MB, ChB, Principal Medical Officer, St. John Ambulance Association and Surgeon-in-Chief, St. John Ambulance Brigade.
- Lieutenant-Colonel Gordon Bryson Kynoch, TD, JP, DL. For political and public services in Banffshire.
- Sydney Lawrence, OBE, Chief Constable, Kingston-upon-Hull City Police.
- Lieutenant-Colonel George Edwin Liddle, OBE, JP, DL, County Commandant, Ulster Special Constabulary.
- Charles Horner Greer Macafee, MB, FRCS, Professor of Midwifery and Gynaecology, Queen's University, Belfast.
- Ian Anderson Macaulay, Clerk of Assize, Northern Circuit, Supreme Court of Judicature.
- Francis Edward McGinnety, Director-General of Inspection, Ministry of Aviation.
- Albert Victor Martin, Chairman, Sheffield Regional Hospital Board.
- Philip Docton Martyn, CIE, OBE, Assistant Secretary, Ministry of Defence.
- William John Milne Menzies, Member, Advisory Committee on Fishery Research.
- James Cecil Mitcheson, Professor of Mining, University of London.
- Major Walter Morris, OBE, MC, Director of Publicity, National Savings Committee.
- The Honourable Sylvia May Fletcher-Moulton, OBE, JP. For political and public services in South-East England.
- Edward Frank Newley, Deputy Director, Atomic Weapons Research Establishment, Aldermaston.
- Albert Walter Alexander Paramor, OBE, Chief Fire and Ambulance Officer, Birmingham.
- Alderman George Albert Pargiter, DL, MP, Vice-Chairman, Executive Council, County Councils Association.
- Richard Ino Payne, OBE, Trade Adviser on Fruit and Vegetables, Ministry of Agriculture, Fisheries and Food.
- Roland Algernon Penrose, Chairman of the Institute of Contemporary Arts.
- Denys Eugene Petchell. For political and public services in Grimsby.
- John Richard Pheazey, Vice-Chairman and Joint General Manager, Standard Telephones and Cables, Ltd.
- Ralph Bonner Pink, VRD, JP. For political and public services in Wessex.
- Allan Richard Plowman, Director of Contracts, Ministry of Works.
- Alan Rawsthorne, Composer.
- Alderman Harry Howard Robinson, JP. For political and public services in Cheshire.
- Arthur Alexander Rubbra, Technical Director, Rolls-Royce Ltd.
- James Bryan Scott, DFC, Sales Director, Crompton Parkinson, Ltd.
- Ernest Julius Walter Simon, Emeritus Professor of Chinese, University of London.
- Harvie Kennard Snell, MD, MRCS, Director of Medical Services, Prison Commission.
- William Ebenezer Clark Souster, JP. For political and public services in Burton-on-Trent.
- Alderman Gertrude Annie Stevenson. For political and public services in Leeds.
- Gershom Stewart. For political services.
- Lieutenant-Commander Godfrey William Style, DSC, Royal Navy (Retired), Chairman, Sheltered Employment Committee of the National Advisory Council on the Employment of the Disabled.
- Lieutenant-Colonel John Arthur Tallent, OBE, TD. For services to Rugby Football.
- Charles Tracker, Managing Director, Ford Motor Company. Ltd.
- Donald Roy Thom. For services to the Grain trade.
- George Cecil Turner, Principal Actuary, Government Actuary's Department.
- Ernest James Vaughan, Deputy Chief Scientific Officer, Admiralty.
- Terence George Ward, MBE, LRCP, FDS, RCS, Dental Surgeon to Queen Victoria Hospital, East Grinstead.
- Gordon Edward Watts, Principal, Brighton Technical College.
- George Comer White, JP, Chairman, Somerset County Agricultural Executive Committee.
- David Matthew Williams, Staff Inspector, Ministry of Education.
- Isabel Grace Hood Wilson, MD, FRCP, Principal Medical Officer, Ministry of Health. For services as Medical Senior Commissioner, Board of Control.
- Harold Woods, HM Deputy Chief Inspector of Factories, Ministry of Labour.
- Arthur James Young, Managing Director, English Electric Valve Co. Ltd., Chelmsford, Essex.
- Frank Chatterton Butler, Counsellor at Shanghai of the Office of the British Chargé d'Affaires in Peking.
- Robert Giffen Dundas, Her Majesty's Consul-General, Stuttgart.
- William Western Greaves, British subject resident in Argentina.
- Frederick Stollard Hardy, OBE, British subject resident in Iraq.
- Colin Forsythe McFarlane, Defence Supply Attaché, Her Majesty's Embassy, Bonn.
- James Mordan, British subject resident in France.
- Andrew John Ronalds, OBE, Her Majesty's Ambassador Extraordinary and Plenipotentiary in Tananarive.
- Matthew Charles Wordsworth, Adviser, Middle East Development Division, Lebanon.
- Joseph Brightwell Alexander, Director of Geological Survey, Federation of Malaya.
- Keith Stirling Anderson, MC, Chairman of the Portland Harbour Trust, State of Victoria.
- Edward Holbrook Derrick, MD, FRACP, Deputy Director, Institute of Medical Research, State of Queensland.
- George Kingston Baron Hay, MC, formerly Director of Agriculture, State of Western Australia.
- Richard Henry Hicks, OBE, Under Secretary, Department of Child Welfare and Social Welfare, State of New South Wales.
- Charles Edward Theodore Mann, formerly Director, Rubber Research Institute of Malaya.
- Ernest Parker, OBE. For services to the United Kingdom community in India.
- Arthur Edward Sharp. For services to the Red Cross in the State of Queensland.
- Herbert Stanley Skipper, an Honorary Special Magistrate, and a Member of the Libraries Board, State of South Australia.
- William Gaston Walkley. For services to Industry in the State of New South Wales.
- Alan Frankland Beakbane. For public services in Kenya.
- James Cook, Director of Agriculture, Sarawak.
- Joseph Edward De Freitas. For public services in British Guiana.
- Joseph Patrick Feeny, OBE, Secretary, Lands and Mines, Nyasaland.
- William Angus Grinsted, Director of The West Indies Meteorological Service.
- Geoffrey Alton Craig Herklots, Principal, Imperial College of Tropical Agriculture, The West Indies.
- Frank Tinley Ingham, lately Director of Geological Survey, Cyprus.
- Reginald Hugh Jones, Chief Electrical Engineer, Crown Agents for Oversea Governments and Administrations.
- John Teasdale Lisle, OBE, TD, Permanent Secretary, East African Land Forces Organisation.
- Vincent Homer McFarlane, OBE, Permanent Secretary, Ministry of Development, Jamaica.
- Professor Joseph Anthony Manche, Vice-Chancellor and Rector Magnificus of the Royal University of Malta.
- Edward James Moss, MC, JP. For public services in St. Helena.
- Ngan Shing-kwan, OBE. For public services in Hong Kong.
- Dennis Frederick Pearl, Development Secretary, Sierra Leone.
- Charles Stuart de Cairos Reay, OBE, Chairman, Public Service Commission, Fiji.
- Malcolm Warrender Richardson, Assistant Postmaster-General (Services), East African Posts and Telecommunications Administration.
- Arthur George Tube, OBE, Financial Secretary, St. Lucia.
- Hermann Denis Darrell Wilkinson, Director of Audit, Uganda.
- Arthur Warriner Williams, FRCP, Professor of Medicine, Makerere College, Uganda.

==== Officer of the Order of the British Empire (OBE) ====
Military Division

Royal Navy

- Colonel Francis Christopher Barton, Royal Marines.
- Acting Commander Alfred Denis Carver.
- Commander John Gwynne Coker.
- Commander Eric Humphreys Davies.
- Commander Jack Armstrong Fenn Clark.
- The Reverend George Kenneth Giggall, Chaplain.
- Commander Roy William Handcock.
- Commander Cecil Agar Johnson, DSC.
- Commander Martin Ernest Lashmore, DSO, DSC.
- Temporary Lieutenant Commander (SCC) Ernest George Merredew, JP, Royal Naval Reserve.
- Surgeon Commander (D) Frederick Arthur Pearse.
- Surgeon Lieutenant Commander John Stuart Pepys Rawlins, MBE.
- Acting Instructor Commander Thomas Richard Smart.
- Commander John Harold Taylor.
- Captain Samuel Thomas, Royal Fleet Auxiliary Service.

Army

- Lieutenant-Colonel Lindsey Jerment Aspland (76723), Royal Army Service Corps.
- Lieutenant-Colonel Vincent Shore Baily (62597), The Somerset and Cornwall Light Infantry.
- Lieutenant-Colonel Ian Clement Campbell, DFC, TD, (386056), Royal Regiment of Artillery, Territorial Army.
- Colonel (local) William Henry Reginald Clifford, MBE, (66934), Royal Regiment of Artillery.
- Lieutenant-Colonel Howard Stanley Corbett, TD, (87113), The King's Shropshire Light Infantry, Territorial Army (now T.A.R.O).
- Lieutenant-Colonel David Charles Parry-Davies (170225), Royal Army Ordnance Corps.
- Lieutenant-Colonel Frederick Manus De Butts, MBE, (68112), The Somerset and Cornwall Light Infantry (Employed List 1); seconded to Aden Protectorate Levies.
- Lieutenant-Colonel Frank James Downes, MBE, (205860), Royal Army Medical Corps (now retired).
- Lieutenant-Colonel George Richard Elsmie (67200), The Gordon Highlanders.
- Lieutenant-Colonel Peter Howard Girling, MBE, (95692), Corps of Royal Electrical and Mechanical Engineers.
- Lieutenant-Colonel Peter Garth Hallett, TD, (109286), Royal Corps of Signals, Territorial Army.
- Lieutenant-Colonel (now Colonel) James Hughes, MBE, TD, (126723), Territorial Army.
- Lieutenant-Colonel (acting) David John Jones, TD, (66418), Combined Cadet Force.
- Lieutenant-Colonel David Alexander St. George Laurie, MC, (71333), 9th/12th Royal Lancers (Prince of Wales's), Royal Armoured Corps.
- Lieutenant-Colonel (acting) Richard Leathwhite, TD, (96624), Army Cadet Force.
- Lieutenant-Colonel Patrick Desmond Kevin Loakman (170566), Royal Regiment of Artillery, Territorial Army.
- Lieutenant-Colonel (now Colonel) Charles Hamilton Mitchell, DSO, (78033), Territorial Army.
- Lieutenant-Colonel William Stanley Mullin (75266), Royal Army Educational Corps.
- Lieutenant-Colonel Hugh Richard Deare Oldman, MC, (62589), The Durham Light Infantry (Employed List 1); seconded to Aden Protectorate Levies.
- Lieutenant-Colonel (temporary) Samuel Oliver (56978), Corps of Royal Engineers (now retired).
- Lieutenant-Colonel David Ronald Moorsom Owen, DSO, (69021), Royal Regiment of Artillery.
- Lieutenant-Colonel Grainger Wilson Reid, MB, MRCP, (203878), Royal Army Medical Corps.
- Lieutenant-Colonel James Herbert Stanley Richards (162382), Royal Army Ordnance Corps.
- Lieutenant-Colonel Ian Nigel Ryle, MC, (151573), Royal Tank Regiment, Royal Armoured Corps (Employed List 1).
- Lieutenant-Colonel Dacre Vernon Sharp, TD, (117203), Royal Regiment of Artillery, Territorial Army.
- Lieutenant-Colonel James Beatty Smith (151754), Corps of Royal Engineers.
- Lieutenant-Colonel Walter Purvis Smith, MBE, (179556), Corps of Royal Engineers, Territorial Army.
- Lieutenant-Colonel Edward Reed Ward Tooby, MC, TD, (64486), The Worcestershire Regiment, Territorial Army.
- Brevet and Temporary Lieutenant-Colonel Harry Crauford Tuzo, MC, (94690), Royal Regiment of Artillery.
- Lieutenant-Colonel Ian Gough Wellsted (88015), Corps of Royal Engineers.
- Lieutenant-Colonel Hilary Garth Waddel Wilson, MC, (380633), Royal Regiment of Artillery (Employed List 1) (now R.A.R.O).
- Lieutenant-Colonel Ronald Chester Winfield (212647), Royal Regiment of Artillery.
- Colonel James Thomas Atherstone Bailey, Bechuanaland Protectorate Police Force.

Additional Officers
In recognition of distinguished service in Malaya for the period 1st January to 31st July 1960.

- Lieutenant-Colonel James Hubert St. George Hamersley (67076), Royal Corps of Signals (now R.A.R.O).
- Lieutenant-Colonel Leonard Henry Lee (90951), The Royal Scots Greys (2nd Dragoons) Employed List 1.
- Lieutenant-Colonel Arthur Gordon Patterson, M.B.E., M.C., (380841), 6th Queen Elizabeth's Own Gurkha Rifles.

Royal Air Force

- Wing Commander the Honourable Michael Charles Adderley, AFC, (40973).
- Wing Commander George Buckle (102990).
- Wing Commander Arthur Sidney Cade (117001).
- Wing Commander Eric Arthur Challis (45413).
- Wing Commander John Dalgleish (146087).
- Wing Commander Richard Ulick Paget de Burgh (118569).
- Wing Commander Robert Findlater, DSO, DFC, (46337).
- Wing Commander George Alfred Fricker (48018), (Retired).
- Wing Commander Laurence Gibson Holmes, DFC, AFC, (137194).
- Wing Commander (Acting Group Captain) William Thomas Howard Howell, DFC, (44757).
- Wing Commander Douglas Edwin Longley (118877).
- Wing Commander William Samuel Oliver Randle, MBE, AFC, DFM, (144393).
- Wing Commander George Hyland Tebboth (31481).
- Wing Commander Ieuan Thomas, DFC, (134556).
- Wing Commander Peter Donald Thorne, AFC, (125469).
- Acting Wing Commander Arthur Victor Duffill, DFC, (86398), Royal Auxiliary Air Force.
- Acting Wing Commander Sydney Arthur Hinde (68465), Royal Air Force Volunteer Reserve (Training Branch).
- Squadron Leader Kenneth Courtnage, AFC, (198605).

Civil Division

- Major Percival Robert Allen, TD. For political and public services in Nottinghamshire.
- William Ferguson Anderson, MD, FRFPS, Regional Consultant in Diseases of Old Age and Chronic Sickness, Western Regional Hospital Board, Scotland.
- John Bertram Wilson Armstrong, Principal, Ministry of Transport.
- Captain Arthur Ellis Baber, Master, SS Uganda, British India Steam Navigation Co. Ltd., London.
- George Douglas Bailey, Assistant Accountant and Comptroller General, Board of Inland Revenue.
- Louisa Priscilla, Alderman Mrs Bailey, JP. For political and public services in Essex.
- Joseph Taylor Robertson Bain, Deputy Controller, Northern Region, Ministry of Labour.
- Herbert William Baker, Superintendent Engineer, Television, London Studios, British Broadcasting Corporation.
- Albert Harry Roy Ball, lately Principal, Methodist College Belfast.
- Sidney Ballance, Chief Constable, Barrow-in-Furness Borough Police Force.
- Herbert Richard Balmer, Assistant Chief Constable, Liverpool City Police Force.
- David Armitage Bannerman, MBE, Ornithologist.
- Malcolm Barnett, MBE, Member, South West Region, National Savings Committee.
- John Denton Ashworth Barnicot, Director, Books Department, British Council.
- Alderman James Alfred Bartram, Chairman, Wellingborough, Peterborough and Kettering War Pensions Committee.
- Lieutenant-Colonel William Franklin Beavan, JP, DL. For political and public services in Flintshire.
- Alderman William Beckett, MM, JP, Chairman, Preston and District War Pensions Committee.
- Alfred William Bedford, AFC, Chief Test Pilot, Hawker Aircraft, Ltd., Dunsfold, Surrey.
- Ronald William Bevan, Senior Principal Scientific Officer, Air Ministry.
- James Black, Works Manager, Mossend, Imperial Chemical Industries, Ltd.
- Dorothy Leslie, Lady Blair. For political and public services in Edinburgh.
- William Lovat Bloomfield, Managing Director, Nigerian Produce Marketing Co. Ltd.
- Godfrey Roland Bolsover. For services to Bowls.
- Harry Albert Bradford, Principal Inspector of Taxes, Board of Inland Revenue.
- James Henry Bradley, Controller, North Midland Region, National Assistance Board.
- John Arthur Broadbent, Chief Officer, Wiltshire County Fire Brigade.
- Lieutenant-Colonel James Cross Brown, DSO, Chairman, Anglo-Portuguese Society.
- Robert Alexander Brown, JP, Chairman, County Londonderry Savings Committee.
- Edward Brundrett, Farmer, St. Mary's in the March and Charing, Kent.
- Leslie James Burrage, Deputy Chairman, North Western Regional Advisory Council for Further Education.
- David Ogilvie Burt, Engineer I, Royal Aircraft Establishment, Ministry of Aviation.
- Leslie Alfred Byles, Director, Gill & Duffus, Ltd.
- William Francis Cavill, Head Postmaster, Reading, Berkshire.
- Doris Elaine Chambers. For services to Golf.
- Stanley Frank Chambers, Assistant Director of Contracts, War Office.
- Walter Leslie Chinn, Chairman, Coventry Schools Savings Committee.
- Robert Morrison Clark, Chief Constable, Airdrie Burgh Police.
- William Norman Charles Clinch, Divisional Controller, Eastern Division, Central Electricity Generating Board.
- Reginald John Couch. For political services in Cornwall.
- Jessie Coull, Chief Executive Officer, Scottish Education Department.
- Brian Trevena Coulton, Director, Harrison & Sons, Ltd., High Wycombe.
- Captain Donald Cowan, Marine Superintendent, David MacBrayne, Ltd., Glasgow.
- Marjorie Josephine Craig, Secretary, Royal Air Force Escaping Society.
- Daniel Ernest Stanley Davies, Senior Principal Clerk, Board of Inland Revenue.
- David James Davies, Deputy Chairman, Cardigan Agricultural Executive Committee.
- William Robert Day, Lecturer in Forestry, University of Oxford.
- Edward Merrills Dearn, MB, ChB, Commissioner, St. John Ambulance Brigade, East Riding of Yorkshire.
- John William Dedman, Line Traffic Manager, London, Tilbury and Southend line, British Railways.
- Alderman Leslie Young Dent, Farmer, Shotley Bridge, County Durham.
- May Louisa Dhonau, Principal, Ministry of Agriculture, Fisheries and Food.
- Peter Harold Dimmock, Head of Television Outside Broadcasts, British Broadcasting Corporation.
- Tom Dobbins, JP. For political and public services in Manchester.
- Stanley James Docking, Principal Inspector, Ministry of Housing and Local Government.
- Samuel James Emerson, HM Senior Electrical Inspector of Factories, Ministry of Labour.
- Arthur Burke Agard Evans, Librarian, Grade I, Ministry of Works.
- David Ewart, JP, Chairman, County Down Employment and Training Advisory Committee.
- Seldon Charles Forrester Farmer, Principal Probation Officer, Inner London Probation Service.
- Noel Stanley Farrow, MBE, Managing Director, Howard Farrow, Ltd.
- Claud William McQuade Stanley Finney, Chief Mechanical Transport Officer, Ministry of Aviation.
- Sidney Alexander Finnis, ERD, Chief Docks Manager, British Transport Docks, Southampton and Plymouth.
- Cyril Fisher, Member representing Wandsworth, National Savings Assembly.
- Elsie Ford. For political services in Sheffield.
- Joyce Alice Bromley-Fox, Chief Executive Officer, Foreign Office.
- Frederick William John Gale, MBE, Managing Director, S. G. Brown, Ltd., Watford.
- Eleanor Constance Garnett. For political and public services in County Tyrone.
- Reginald Garnsey, MBE, Manager, Carrickfergus Works, Messrs. Courtaulds, Ltd.
- Clement Norman Gautrey, JP, Chairman, Cambridgeshire Civil Defence Committee.
- Ronald George Gibson, MRCS, LRCP, General Practitioner, Member, Hampshire Executive Council Local Medical Committee, National Health Service.
- Samuel James Giffen, Senior Assistant Telecommunications Controller, Northern Ireland, General Post Office.
- Edwin Charles Girling, MD, ChB, Chairman, Holborn No. 1 National Service Medical Board.
- Douglas Grey, Commercial International Manager, British European Airways Corporation.
- Max Grünhut, lately Reader in Criminology, University of Oxford.
- Sidney Arthur Gwynn, Superintending Inspector, Children's Department, Home Office.
- William Woolf Harris, JP. For political and public services in London.
- Robert Randall Harvey, Chairman, Birmingham Council for Old People.
- Wilfred Roy Harvey, Manager, Marine Department, Balbcock & Wilcox, Ltd.
- Elizabeth Heatlie, JP, Chief Executive Officer, Ministry of Pensions and National Insurance.
- Ernest Kenneth Hickman. For political and public services in Luton.
- James Johnston Hogg, Staff Inspector, Ministry of Education, Northern Ireland.
- Norman Roy Hood, Director, British Paper and Board Industry Research Association.
- Norah Horner, MBE, Chairman, North-West Regional Street Groups Savings Committee.
- Arthur Egerton Hourd, JP, Chairman, Stafford Disablement Advisory Committee.
- Cecil Reginald Howe, Superintending Armament Supply Officer, Royal Naval Armament Depot, Crombie.
- John Robert Baden Howlett, Director of General Stores, War Office.
- George Donald Ireland, TD, Chief Engineer, Windscale and Calder Works, Cumberland, United Kingdom Atomic Energy Authority.
- John John, Chairman, Cardiganshire County Council.
- The Reverend James Johnston. For political and public services in County Londonderry.
- Alderman Dafydd Jones, MBE, Chairman, Montgomeryshire Education Committee.
- Martin William Jones, Principal Examiner, Ministry of Power.
- Winifred May Knight, Alderman, East Ham County Borough.
- Joseph Albert Knowles, MC, Financial Adviser, Methodist Education Committee.
- Frederick Ernest Langer, Marine Engineer Superintendent, Royal Fleet Auxiliary Service, Admiralty.
- George Napier Lawrence, Senior Chief Executive Officer, Ministry of Agriculture, Fisheries and Food.
- Horace Lawrence, Principal, Board of Customs and Excise.
- John Lewin, FRCS, JP, Chairman, King's Lynn Savings Committee.
- William Edmund Ames Lewis, Senior Legal Assistant (Assistant Commissioner), Charity Commission.
- Philip Roland Lindley, Financial Secretary, King George's Fund for Sailors.
- John Eric Russell Little, MBE, Grade 2 Officer, Branch B, HM Foreign Service.
- Observer Captain Norman Francis Lockyer, MBE, Commandant, Western Area Headquarters, Royal Observer Corps.
- Lieutenant-Colonel Archibald Duncan Campbell Macaulay, Secretary and Treasurer, All England Lawn Tennis and Croquet Club.
- Louis Reginald Macbeth, Principal Regional Officer, North Midlands, Ministry of Health.
- Edward Willett MacGowan, Secretary, Navy, Army and Air Force Institutes.
- John McGregor, Higher Collector, Glasgow, Board of Customs and Excise.
- George McIver, Member, Northern Regional Hospital Board.
- Alastair Crighton MacKell, JP, Headmaster, Glenurquhart Senior Secondary School, Inverness-shire.
- Alexander David Cockfourn Main, JP, Potato merchant and seed potato grower, Perthshire.
- William John Masters, Principal Information Officer, Central Office of Information.
- Francis Sidney Megnin, Chief Executive Officer, Ministry of Transport.
- Walter Harold Meredith, Official Receiver, Board of Trade.
- Arthur Milne, Principal, Department of Health for Scotland.
- Mary Gladys Morrison Minton, County Director, Nairnshire Branch, British Red Cross Society.
- Ronald Robert Mitchell, First Class Valuer, Board of Inland Revenue.
- William John Mitchell, Deputy Controller, East and West Ridings Region, Ministry of Labour.
- Alderman Eric Edward Mole, JP. For political and public services in Birmingham.
- Rowland Claude Moore, General Manager, Sheffield Corporation Transport Department.
- Rudolph Howard Moore, Clerk and Civil Defence Officer, Baildon Urban District Council, Yorkshire (West Riding).
- Edith Moorhouse, Assistant Education Officer, Oxfordshire.
- John Richard Morgan, Chairman, Welsh Association of Boys' Clubs.
- The Right Honourable Henry John Alexander, Baron Mottistone, architect. For services in the construction of the Chapel of the Order of the British Empire in St. Paul's Cathedral.
- Ernest Harley Mould, Principal Assistant to the Remembrancer, Corporation of London.
- Lieutenant-Colonel Francis Edward Nangle, Secretary, Territorial and Auxiliary Forces Association, Counties of Armagh and Down.
- Ernest James Neale, Chairman, South Eastern Trustee Savings Bank.
- Desmond West Edmund Neligan, Umpire under the National Service Act, 1948.
- Lucy Frances Nettlefold. For public services. Lately Member, London County Council.
- Ernest George Vincent Newman, Principal Scientific Officer, Royal Mint.
- Daniel Neylan, Principal, Ministry of Education.
- Bryce Ramsay Nisbet, MD, FRCP, Medical Officer of Health, Kilmarnock.
- Richard Offor, lately Library Adviser to the Inter-University Council for Higher Education Overseas.
- Annie Mary Parker, Lately Matron, Children's Hospital, Sheffield.
- Wilfred Thomas Pawley, Senior Chief Executive Officer, Board of Trade.
- Thomas Robert Percy, JP. For political services in County Durham.
- William de Guerin Price, MC, Chief Labour Officer, Ministry of Works.
- David Evan Parry-Pritchard, MD, County Medical Officer of Health, Caernarvon.
- Selwyn Harold Welford Pumphrey, TD, Chairman, Northern Regional Wholesale Provisions and Groceries Committee.
- Richard Bridges St. John Quarry. For political services in Reading.
- Marjorie Rackstraw, Member, National Old People's Welfare Council.
- John Donald Read. For political services in Kent.
- Alfred Allan Reid, Senior Chief Executive Officer, Ministry of Pensions and National Insurance.
- John Rhys-Roberts, MBE, JP, Chairman, Executive Committee, Llangollen International Eisteddfod.
- Bryan Robertson, Director, Whitechapel Art Gallery.
- Norman Robson, London Editor, Westminster Press Provincial Newspapers, Ltd.
- Richard Stewart Rogers, Principal Officer, Ministry of Health and Local Government, Northern Ireland.
- William Tudur Rowlands, MRCVS, Veterinary Investigation Officer, Ministry of Agriculture, Fisheries and Food.
- Margaret Rutherford (Margaret Taylor, Mrs Stringer Davis), Actress.
- Harry Wallace Sanders, Superintending Civil Engineer, Grade I, Air Ministry.
- John Scupham, Head, Educational Broadcasting, British Broadcasting Corporation.
- Fitz Donald Severn, General Manager, No. 4 Area, East Midlands Division, National Coal Board.
- Harold Shaw, MBE, General Secretary, United Kingdom Committee for World Refugee Year.
- Harry Shilleto, Chairman, Livestock and Wool Committee, National Farmers Union, England and Wales.
- Arthur Reginald Shove, Assistant Director, Board of Trade.
- Ronald Charles Simpkin, Assistant Director, Ministry of Agriculture, Fisheries and Food.
- John Frankland Smithie, Engineer and Surveyor, Bletchley Urban District Council.
- Charles William Sowton, Assistant Staff Engineer, General Post Office.
- Frank Nelson Sparkes, Senior Principal Scientific Officer, Road Research Laboratory, Department of Scientific and Industrial Research.
- Jessie Spencer, ARRC, Chairman, Nottingham Branch, Young Women's Christian Association.
- Eulalie Evan Spicer, Secretary, No. 1 (London) Legal Aid Area Committee, The Law Society.
- Alderman John Stirrup, Chairman, Preston and District Advisory Committee, National Assistance Board.
- Thomas Neave Sumpter, Headmaster, Westcliffe County Secondary School, Scunthorpe.
- Edward Eastaway Thomas, DSC, Joint Intelligence Bureau Officer, Grade I, Ministry of Defence.
- Leslie Glynn Thomas, British Council Representative in Ghana.
- Reginald Stanley Tizzard, Deputy Chief Surveyor of Lands, Admiralty.
- Joan Doreen Tomkin. For political and public services in Norfolk.
- Wilfred Tomlinson, Chief Engineer, MS Amazon, Royal Mail Lines, Ltd., London.
- Herbert John Toms, Principal Inspector, Board of Customs and Excise.
- Thomas James Tooley, Senior Principal Scientific Officer, Admiralty Surface Weapons Establishment, Portsdown, Hampshire.
- Lieutenant-Colonel The Honourable Dudley Oliver Trench, Assistant Chief Constable, War Office.
- Fred Turnbull, JP, Chief Executive Officer, Ministry of Pensions and National Insurance.
- Barbara Lilian Turner, TD. For political services.
- Theodora Turner, ARRC, Matron, St. Thomas's Hospital and Superintendent, Nightingale Training School.
- Robert Vert, Secretary, North East Coast Engineering Employers' Association.
- Frederick John Waller, Senior Chief Executive Officer, Export Credits Guarantee Department.
- Francis Arthur White, Principal, Air Ministry.
- Horace Edmund Wildgoose, Chairman, Mattock and District Local Employment Committee.
- Herbert Edward Wilkinson, Assistant Accountant General, Ministry of Labour.
- William Henry Williams, Honorary Legal Adviser to the Commons, Open Spaces and Footpaths Preservation Society.
- Thomas Muir Wilson, JP, Vice-Chairman (Employers' Representative), Scottish Board for Industry.
- William Wilson, Artist in Stained Glass.
- John Charles Wolridge, MBE. For services to the North Gloucester Productivity Association.
- Frank Woodhead, Chairman and Managing Director, Toledo Woodhead Springs, Ltd.
- George Stuart Young, Chairman, High Wycombe, Aylesbury and District Employment Committee.
- John William Henry Berkeley Younger, Chairman, Younger (Benmore) Trust.
- Harold Atkin, First Secretary (Labour), Her Majesty's Embassy, Helsinki.
- Alexander Hope Birch, First Secretary (Commercial), Her Majesty's Embassy, Khartoum.
- The Reverend Canon Douglas Alexander Duncan, MC, lately Chaplain to Her Majesty's Embassy, Athens.
- Arthur Garbett Evans, Her Majesty's Consul, Elisabethville.
- Eric Lionel Fox, Her Majesty's Consul, Teneriffe.
- Norman Robert Stephen Joly, British subject resident in the Lebanon.
- Walter Patrick Scott Lane, Her Majesty's Consul, Venice.
- Charles Herbert Lankester, British subject resident in Costa Rica.
- Jasper Michael Leadbitter, Her Majesty's Consul, Leopoldville.
- Willoughby Walter Matthews, British subject resident in Burma.
- John Gerald Grainger Muir, DSC, lately British Council Representative, Persian Gulf.
- Daphne Margaret Sybil Desirée Park, British Consul, Leopoldville.
- George Felix Randegger, MBE, Medical Director, Salvator Mundi Hospital, Rome.
- Alfred Bickerton Rudge, Manager, Guaqui Railway, La Paz.
- Margaret Grant Sanderson, lately Headmistress, Tripoli College, Libya.
- Lieutenant-Commander Norman Edward Sandiford, DSM, Royal Naval Volunteer Reserve (Retd.), British Consul, Ostend.
- Colonel Henry Arthur Wilsdon, Chairman, Paris Branch of the British Legion.
- Theodor Brunn, President of the Royal Horticultural Society, State of Victoria.
- Frederick Alexander Sommerville Caldwell, Senior Assistant Commissioner of Police, Federation of Malaya.
- William Westman Corbould, Mayor of Quirindi, State of New South Wales.
- Leslie David Davis. For services to Commerce in the State of New South Wales.
- Vaughan William Powell-Evans, Senior Assistant Commissioner of Police, Federation of Malaya.
- Ryk le Sueur Fischer, JP, a Farmer in Southern Rhodesia.
- Edith Francis, Superintendent, Bush Nursing Association, State of Victoria.
- John Travers Mends Gibson, of Ajmer, India. For services to United Kingdom interests.
- Charles Dymoke Green, formerly of Colombo, Ceylon. For community work.
- Bruce Wallace Nicholas Griffiths, JP, Secretary of the Launceston General Hospital, State of Tasmania.
- Trevlyn John Hardingham, of Darjeeling, India. For services to the United Kingdom community.
- Lucy Amelia Hawkes, Sister-in-Charge, Bush Nursing Home, McKinlay, State of Queensland.
- Edgar Le Blond Henderson. For services to Architecture in the State of Western Australia.
- Thomas Seymour Hill, Secretary of the National Football League, State of South Australia.
- Archibald Booth Macgregor. For services to ex-servicemen in the State of New South Wales.
- Colin Alexander McCallum, Chief Librarian, Public Library, State of Victoria.
- Dunstable Philip Shan McCarthy, of Rawalpindi, Pakistan. For services to the United Kingdom community.
- Joseph James McDonald, of Clayfield, State of Queensland. For services to returned servicemen and bush children.
- Thomas Murray McDougal, a Farmer in Southern Rhodesia.
- Andrew Agnew Neilson Mills, Chairman of the Pastures Protection Board at Hay, and a Member of the Waradgery Shire Council, State of New South Wales.
- May Mills. For services to Education and social welfare organisations in the State of South Australia.
- William Hostes Herault Nicolle, Native Commissioner, Native Affairs Department, Southern Rhodesia.
- James Burke O'Leary, MBE, formerly Director of Armament Supply, Pakistan Navy.
- Una Beatrice Porter, MB, BS. For social welfare services in the State of Victoria, particularly under the auspices of the Young Women's Christian Association.
- George William Sandells, ED, Commissioner and Territorial Commander of the Salvation Army, Melbourne, State of Victoria.
- The Reverend David Leslie Scott, MBE, formerly Principal, Murray College, Sialkot, Pakistan.
- Ernest Oscar Tout, Under Secretary, Department of Agriculture, State of New South Wales.
- Richard Waddell, formerly State Engineer, Selangor, Federation of Malaya.
- James Walton, formerly Deputy Director of Education, Basutoland.
- Harry Lambert Wheeler, of Newcastle, State of New South Wales. For services to the community.
- Arthur Desmond York, President of the Municipal Council, Kuala Lumpur, Federation of Malaya.
- Ernest Verano Andlaw, MBE, Electrical Engineer to the City Council, Gibraltar.
- Robert Lawrence Armstrong, Director of Public Works, Sierra Leone.
- Jugah anak Barieng, Temenggong (Paramount Chief of Sea Dayaks) in the Third Division, Sarawak.
- The Reverend Harold John Barnes, lately Secretary and Treasurer to the London Missionary Society in Northern Rhodesia.
- Robert Ogle Barnes, Senior Soil Conservation Engineer, Kenya.
- Eric William Mansfield Bowen. For public services in British Honduras.
- Charles Beresford Brandford. For public services in Barbados.
- Lieutenant-Commander Frederick Ranson Fairies Broomhead, Royal Naval Reserve (Retired), Principal Assistant to the Chief Ports Manager, East African Railways and Harbours.
- The Very Reverend Edmund Michael Hubert Capper, Provost of Dar es Salaam, Tanganyika.
- Cheung Wing-min, Senior Principal, Education Department, Hong Kong.
- The Right Reverend Monsignor Edward Coleiro. For public services in Malta.
- Eric Kennedy Cruickshank, FRCP, Professor of Medicine, University College of the West Indies.
- Francis William Hall Downing, Chief Engineer, Abyan Board, Western Aden Protectorate.
- Brian Oliver Lyndhurst Duke, MB, BCh, Senior Medical Research Officer, Grade II, West African Council for Medical Research.
- Ian Duncan Fraser, DSC, lately Acting Permanent Secretary, Singapore.
- George Hudson Goodacre, Treasurer, Minister of Finance, and Privy Councillor, in the Government of Tonga.
- Rolph Stewart Grant. For public services in Jamaica.
- William Henry Gunson. For public services in Kenya.
- Eric Harvey Halse, MBE, Deputy Commissioner of Police, Northern Rhodesia.
- Ronald Brodie Heisch, MD, BCh, Senior Specialist, Medical Department, and Director of the Insect Borne Diseases Division, Medical Research Laboratory, Nairobi, Kenya.
- Cecil William Howard, Deputy Labour Commissioner, Tanganyika.
- The Reverend Peter Henry Herbert Howes, Canon of the Cathedral of St. Thomas's, Kuching, Sarawak.
- Arthur Jackson, lately Director of Chemistry, Malaya.
- Hubert David Jordan, Officer in Charge, Rice Research Station, Sierra Leone.
- Richard Arthur Pearce Leach, Director of Public Works, Southern Cameroons.
- Michael John Macoun, Commissioner of Police, Uganda.
- Wkamisese Kapaiwai Tuimacilai Mara, Acting Deputy Secretary for Fijian Affairs, Fiji.
- George Forshaw Messervy. For public services in British Guiana.
- Adam Sapi Mkwawa, MBE, Paramount Chief, Uhehe, Tanganyika.
- Allan Stewart Moodie, MB, ChB, Senior Specialist (Tuberculosis), Hong Kong.
- Edward Allan Morris, Head of Appointments and Passages Department, Crown Agents for Oversea Governments and Administrations.
- Paulo Ngologoza, MBE. For public services in Uganda.
- Geoffrey Tozer Pike, Headmaster, Blantyre Secondary School, Nyasaland.
- Walter Adolphe Roberts. For services to literature in Jamaica.
- Kenneth Vane Arnim Rodgers, MB, ChB. For public services in the Bahamas.
- Frederick Pannell Sharpe. For public services in Aden.
- Ian George Guthrit Smith. For public services in Mauritius.
- Margaret Maria Johannes Smith, JP. For public services in Northern Rhodesia.
- Mervyn Vice Smithyman, Senior District Commissioner, Zanzibar.
- Wilfred James Sproson, Mechanical Engineer, North Borneo Railways.
- Charles Frederick Theadom, Administrative Secretary, West African Institute for Oil Palm Research.
- Bockari Torto, Paramount Chief, Nimi Yema, Sierra Leone.
- Hugh Selby Norman-Walker, Deputy Financial Secretary, Nyasaland.
- Reginald James Wallace, Financial Secretary in the former Somaliland Protectorate.
- George Thomas Warren. For public services in Saint Christopher Nevis Anguilla.
- James Arnold Waterman, MD, ChB. For public services in Trinidad.
- Frederick Robert James Williams, MBE, Permanent Secretary, Ministry of Natural Resources, Uganda.
- Keith Digby Young, MRCS, LRCP, Senior Medical Officer (Clinical) in the former Somaliland Protectorate.

==== Member of the Order of the British Empire (MBE) ====
Military Division

Royal Navy

- Instructor Lieutenant-Commander Arthur Harold Conway Brister.
- Captain (SD) Alfred George Brown, Royal Marines.
- Lieutenant Commander (SD) George Bertie Claxton.
- Lieutenant Commander John Gray Corbett.
- Lieutenant Commander Archibald Thomas Jack Diboll, (Retired).
- Lieutenant Commander (SD) Douglas Walter Frederick Elliott.
- Lieutenant Commander William George Endean.
- Engineer Lieutenant Commander Arthur John Hinkley.
- Lieutenant Commander (Sp) Eric Leslie Kelland, Royal Naval Reserve.
- Lieutenant Commander Geoffrey George Edward Lewis, (Retired).
- Temporary Lieutenant Commander (A) (AE) Nigel Godfrey Parkinson, Royal Naval Volunteer Reserve.
- Lieutenant Commander George Rosie.
- Lieutenant Commander Lawrence Ryder Tivy.
- Lieutenant Commander (SD) Ross William Walton, BEM.

Army

- Major Ronald Jack Andrews (292529), Corps of Royal Engineers.
- Major Stanley Thomas Baldry (307721), Corps of Royal Engineers.
- Major (temporary) Alfred Christopher Bate (400751), Royal Corps of Signals.
- Major Stephen Ralph William Beard (305226), Intelligence Corps.
- Captain (Director of Music) Oliver Birkin (425332), Corps of Royal Electrical and Mechanical Engineers.
- Major (Quartermaster) Gordon George Roy Boon (341937), Royal Army Service Corps.
- Captain Thomas Joseph Burtenshaw (371305), Royal Army Ordnance Corps, Territorial Army.
- 886058 Warrant Officer Class I Charles Henry Caplin, Royal Regiment of Artillery.
- Major James Edward Carroll (281410), Royal Corps of Signals.
- Major John Philip Chutter (186017), The Royal Warwickshire Regiment.
- Major (Quartermaster) George Collins (301651), Corps of Royal Engineers.
- Major Robert Frederick Collins, TD, (140723), Royal Regiment of Artillery, Territorial Army.
- 14456023 Warrant Officer Class I Peter John Collman, The Queen's Royal Surrey Regiment.
- Major Edwin Corner, TD, (88433), The Bedfordshire Regiment, Territorial Army (now T.A.R.O).
- Major John Edward Driver, TD, (96766), The Duke of Wellington's Regiment (West Riding), Territorial Army (now Retired).
- 1055721 Warrant Officer Class I Ernest England, Royal Regiment of Artillery, Territorial Army.
- Major (Quartermaster) Robert Frederick Evans (125425), Army Catering Corps.
- Major (local) George Raymond Fletcher (377837), Corps of Royal Engineers.
- Major William Thomas Gleghorn, MM, TD, (408830), North Irish Horse, Royal Armoured Corps, Territorial Army.
- S/4344310 Warrant Officer Class I Robert Goodrum, Royal Army Service Corps.
- Captain (Quartermaster) Robert Edward Grainger (438724), The Parachute Regiment.
- Major Florence Marianne Harford (239548), Women's Royal Army Corps.
- Major Leslie Jesse Harrison (231127), Royal Army Medical Corps.
- Major Arthur Francis Hicks (212416), Corps of Royal Engineers.
- Major Felix Edward Hogwood (155994), Intelligence Corps.
- Major (acting) Robert William Iley, MM, (367142), Army Cadet Force.
- 7888451 Warrant Officer Class I Thomas Kendell, Royal Tank Regiment, Royal Armoured Corps.
- 6896589 Warrant Officer Class II Ernest Frank Knell, Queen Victoria's Rifles, The King's Royal Rifle Corps, Territorial Army.
- 22206473 Warrant Officer Class II Henry Knott, Royal Tank Regiment, Royal Armoured Corps, Territorial Army.
- Major (Master-at-Arms) Leslie Lambert (261879), Army Physical Training Corps.
- 21004526 Warrant Officer Class II William Protheroe Llewellyn, Corps of Royal Engineers, Territorial Army.
- 2662165 Warrant Officer Class I (acting) John George Lockey, Coldstream Guards.
- Major Alastair Torquil Macleod (212226), Royal Regiment of Artillery.
- S/14442329 Warrant Officer Class I Roy Marsh, Royal Army Service Corps.
- Major Gilbert Edward Marshall, MM, (296952), Royal Armoured Corps.
- Major Jack McFarlane (384034), Royal Army Service Corps.
- 3055622 Warrant Officer Class II Robert Andrew McKenzie, Military Provost Staff Corps.
- Captain Maurice Wilfred Munday, TD, (210168), Corps of Royal Electrical and Mechanical Engineers, Territorial Army.
- Captain Alexander John Munro (231948), Royal Regiment of Artillery, Territorial Army.
- Captain Roy George Orgill (188351), Corps of Royal Engineers, Territorial Army.
- 5827109 Warrant Officer Class II Ernest Jackman Parmenter, Royal Regiment of Artillery.
- Major (temporary) Henry Salusbury Legh Dalzell-Payne (408326), The Queen's Own Hussars, Royal Armoured Corps.
- Major Alan Brooke Pemberton (253904), Coldstream Guards.
- Captain Thomas Edward Pickard (164295), Corps of Royal Electrical and Mechanical Engineers, Territorial Army.
- Major (Quartermaster) Gordon Charles Powell (421051), Small Arms School Corps.
- Major (acting) Maurice Hermann Rabin (286976), Army Cadet Force.
- Major Hamilton Fraser Riach (138598), Royal Regiment of Artillery.
- Captain (Quartermaster) Walter John Rolfe (434297), The Loyal Regiment (North Lancashire).
- Major Albert Alexander Seaton (299322), Corps of Royal Engineers.
- Major (Brevet Lieutenant-Colonel) Roderick Ferguson Semple, MC, (237304), Corps of Royal Engineers.
- Major Eric Osmond Smith, DCM, (349271), Royal Corps of Signals.
- Major John Wilfred Stanier (365443), The Queen's Own Hussars, Royal Armoured Corps.
- Major (Quartermaster) Ronald Henry Statham (164304), Royal Regiment of Artillery.
- Major Derrick John Sutton (338900), Royal Army Service Corps.
- Captain Walter Louvain Thompson, DCM, (421838), The Life Guards.
- Captain (Quartermaster) Robert Hair Thomson, DCM, (448091), Scots Guards.
- Major Lester Tolmie (167156), The Prince of Wales's Own Regiment of Yorkshire (Employed List 3).
- 6757655 Warrant Officer Class II Edward Frederick Townsend, The Queen's Royal Regiment (West Surrey), Territorial Army.
- Major (Quartermaster) Frederick Norman Voysey (413707), 2nd Green Jackets, The King's Royal Rifle Corps (now Retired).
- Captain (Quartermaster) Thomas Walls (451715), Royal Regiment of Artillery.
- Major (acting) Leonard Wardle, TD, (203050), Combined Cadet Force.
- Major Giles Phillips Williams, TD, (124583), The Royal Welch Fusiliers, Territorial Army.
- Major Ian Thomas Candelent Wilson, MC, (273491), Corps of Royal Engineers.
- Captain (acting) William Alfred Wright (286802), Army Cadet Force.
- Major John Malcolm Arbuthnot Younger (95109), Royal Regiment of Artillery.
- Captain Bernard Robert Sands, Basutoland Mounted Police.
- Major Dunstan Fitzgerald Robinson, 1st Battalion, The West India Regiment.
- Warrant Officer Class II George Arnold Carter, The Barbados Regiment.
- Warrant Officer Class I (temporary) Kiniviliame Cava, Fiji Military Forces.

Additional Members
In recognition of distinguished service in Malaya for the period 1st January to 31st July 1960.

- Captain Angus Leslie Campbell (411909), The Royal Scots (The Royal Regiment), seconded to the Federation Army.
- Captain (Temporary Major) Richard Martyn Jerram, (397291), Royal Tank Regiment.
- Major Malcolm Meerendonk (378728), Royal Army Educational Corps.
- Major Kenneth William Nevines, M.C., (200791), The Green Howards (Alexandra Princess of Wales's Own Yorkshire Regiment), seconded to the Federation Army.
- Captain (Temporary Major) Ralph Neil Playfair Reynolds (376092), 6th Queen Elizabeth's Own Gurkha Rifles.
- Major Leslie Watson Wright (30175), The Royal New Zealand Artillery.
- Major Francis Anness Bishop (30224), Royal New Zealand Army Ordnance Corps.

Royal Air Force

- Squadron Leader Stanley Douglas Baldock, DFM, (148100).
- Squadron Leader Reginald Stanley Brown (178810).
- Squadron Leader Charles Frank Stuart Churcher (49367).
- Squadron Leader Stanley George Alfred Goddard (629460).
- Squadron Leader Robert Charles Hogg (46665).
- Squadron Leader Haydn Edward Jacobs (178225).
- Squadron Leader William Charles James (3107829).
- Squadron Leader George Harold Louden (137154).
- Squadron Officer Janet Mackay (363), Women's Royal Air Force.
- Squadron Leader Kenneth Macrae (613290).
- Squadron Leader (Acting Wing Commander) Eric James Douglas Masters (51463).
- Squadron Leader Denzil Phillips, DFC, (53492).
- Squadron Officer (Acting Wing Officer) Gwenllian Mary Phillips (2866), Women's Royal Air Force.
- Squadron Leader Ronald Renner (45516).
- Squadron Leader (now Wing Commander) William Albert Russell (73381).
- Squadron Leader Frederick Reginald Charles Staff (182877).
- Squadron Leader (Acting Wing Commander) Joseph Charles Kent Sutton (45732).
- Squadron Leader Jack Wilson (130410).
- Acting Squadron Leader Stuart Robertson Jeffrey, DFC, (126959).
- Acting Squadron Leader James Fulton Leckie (105512).
- Acting Squadron Leader Frederick Gordon Ley (156966), Royal Air Force Volunteer Reserve (Training Branch).
- Flight Lieutenant Alfred John Aedy (56945).
- Flight Lieutenant James Duncan Davie (50249).
- Flight Lieutenant James Edwin Greenaway (179105).
- Flight Lieutenant Harry Logan (539735).
- Flight Lieutenant James Robert Morris (566205).
- Flight Lieutenant Hugh Alexander Pollock (203858).
- Flight Lieutenant Herbert Mark Sorrell (48045).
- Flight Lieutenant Ernest William Tipple (64277).
- Flight Lieutenant Henry Barclay Todd (590369).
- Flight Lieutenant George William James Walker (197282).
- Flight Lieutenant Arthur George Willshaw, BEM, (57693).
- Flight Lieutenant Laurence Wing (2505182).
- Acting Flight Lieutenant Harry Pretoria Davis (102820), Royal Air Force Volunteer Reserve (Training Branch).
- Flying Officer James Mitchell Falconer Crofts (2693000), Royal Auxiliary Air Force.
- Flying Officer Gordon Anthony Tottey (570996).
- Master Engineer William John Henry Wickson (3033167).
- Master Technician Leslie Maurice Howe (562990).
- Master Technician William Foster Jackman (565581).
- Warrant Officer Thomas Andrew Armstrong (590732).
- Warrant Officer John Binns (365143).
- Warrant Officer Hugh Charles Furse (622468).
- Warrant Officer Stanley Banyard Hicks, BEM, (958812).
- Warrant Officer Albert Thomas Jarvis (561764).
- Warrant Officer Peter Portway (515739).
- Warrant Officer Joseph Archibald Rollason (510998).

Civil Division

- Marjorie Sophia Holmes à Court, Secretary, British Council for Aid to Refugees.
- Henry Arthur Adams, Superintendent Engineer, Glenside and Barrow Hospital Management Committee.
- Sydney Norman Adams, Senior Executive Officer, Colonial Office.
- Wilfrid George Adams, Senior Executive Officer, Ministry of Power.
- Henry Oswald Adshead, Clerical Officer, Ministry of Aviation.
- James McClure Alexander, Managing-Director, A. J. Siris Products, Ltd., Lanchester.
- William McCreight Allen, Deputy Principal, Ministry of Commerce, Northern Ireland.
- Margaret Alice Anderson, Headmistress, Manorfield County Primary School, Poplar.
- Herbert James Andrews, Secretary-Manager, Church of England Soldiers', Sailors' and Airmen's Club, Steamer Point, Aden.
- John Robert Appleby, Experimental Officer, Ministry of Agriculture, Fisheries and Food.
- Captain Alfred Stafford Bain, lately Master, SS Makrana, T. & J. Brocklebank, Ltd., Liverpool.
- Frank Baker, Assistant Works Manager, A. Reyrolle & Co. Ltd.
- Edgar Cecil Banks, LMSSA, lately Deputy Chairman, Preston No. 1 Medical Board, Ministry of Labour.
- Gladys Evelyn Barlow, Higher Executive Officer, Home Office.
- Philip Arthur Barnes, Secretary, Lancashire Branch, Council for the Preservation of Rural England.
- William John Bell, District Commandant, Ulster Special Constabulary.
- Harold Louis Bennett, Chief Male Nurse, Broadmoor Institution, Ministry of Health.
- Geoffrey Cyril Bentley, Senior Executive Officer, Air Ministry.
- William John Bevan, JP, Councillor, Brecon County Council.
- Walter Frederick Bird, lately Assistant Librarian, Bar Library, Royal Courts of Justice.
- Alfred Charlesworth Birkbeck, Employment Officer, South West Region, Royal National Institute for the Blind.
- Janet Rachel Margaret Bisley. For services to the Women's Squash Rackets Association.
- John Maltby Black, JP, Chairman of Committee, No. 128 (Barrow) Squadron, Air Training Corps.
- Philip Christopher Bloomer, Higher Executive Officer, Ministry of Pensions and National Insurance.
- Winifred Marianne Boiling, Clerical Officer, Ministry of Transport.
- Josephine Brenner, Secretary to the Director, British Cast Iron Research Association.
- Margaret Brodrick, JP, Breeder of Welsh Mountain Ponies.
- Arthur Oswald Brown, Assistant Inspector, Board of Customs and Excise.
- Herbert Joseph Brown, Member, Gloucester Agricultural Executive Committee.
- Ronald Ernest Charles Brown, Assistant Chief Engineer, Telephone Apparatus Department, Associated Electrical Industries, Ltd.
- Marion Browne. For political and public services in Liverpool.
- General Richard Burt, Grade 3 Officer, Ministry of Labour.
- John Cecil Burton, Executive Officer, HM Treasury.
- John Campbell, Assistant Manager, Royal Naval Torpedo Factory, Alexandria, Dunbartonshire.
- Robert Sigfred Carlsson, Skipper, Trawler Northards, Fleetwood. For services in salvage operations for the recovery of an aircraft lost at sea.
- Edwin Carr, Senior Surveyor, Ministry of Works.
- George Ronald Carr, Senior Executive Officer, Ministry of Pensions and National Insurance.
- Ethel May Haddon Carter, JP, County Borough Organiser, Eastbourne, Women's Voluntary Service.
- John Shirley Caswell, Higher Executive Officer, Board of Trade.
- Joan Audrey Chaffers. For political services in Keighley and Bambury.
- Robert James Chantree, Charge Nurse, Claybury (Mental) Hospital, Woodford Bridge, Essex.
- David Chapel, TD, Honorary Secretary, Arbroath Life-Boat Station, Royal National Life-Boat Institution.
- Edwin Jacob Chivell. For political services in Cornwall.
- Marjorie Helen Clarry. For political services in Cornwall.
- John Arthur Clotworthy, Supervising Examiner, Western Traffic Area, Ministry of Transport.
- Robert Vernon Oolquhoun, lately Chief Superintendent, Glasgow City Police.
- Joseph Cook, Chairman, Ennerdale Rural District Council.
- Winifred Emmie Cook, BEM, JP, County Borough Organiser, Bradford, Women's Voluntary Service.
- Edwin Frederick Coppins, Senior Executive Officer, Paymaster General's Office.
- Winifred Doris Cornelius, Supervisor, Langstone House Day Training Centre for the Mentally Sub-Normal, Portsmouth.
- William Donnell Costello, Grade 3 Officer, North Western Regional Office, Ministry of Labour.
- Arthur Clarence Cox, Manager, Birmingham Employment Exchange, Ministry of Labour.
- George Edward Craft, Competition Secretary, St. John Ambulance Association.
- David Crawford, JP, Secretary, Birmingham District, Amalgamated Society of Woodworkers.
- James Crichton, lately Ship Manager (Steel), Alexander Stephen & Sons, Ltd., Glasgow.
- John Dalziel, Superintendent, Headquarters Traffic Office, Birmingham & Midland Motor Omnibus Co. Ltd.
- Sydney Leonard Daniel, Managing Director, Pegrex, Ltd., Birmingham.
- Barbara Joyce Daniels. For political and public services in London.
- Kathleen Daniels, JP. For services to the Girl Guides Association.
- Frances Margaretta Davies, District Nurse Midwife, Breconshire County Council.
- Arthur Edward Deverill, lately Executive Officer, Ministry of Defence.
- Percy Devonish, Executive Officer, War Office.
- Robert Bigland Dickinson, Executive Engineer, General Post Office.
- Lieutenant-Colonel Arthur Kenelm Digby, DSO, Honorary Secretary, Lincolnshire Branch, Soldiers', Sailors' and Airmen's Families Association.
- Oswald Francis Diver, Voluntary Braille Writer, Royal National Institute for the Blind.
- Harold Marshall Dodge, Senior Executive Officer, HM Stationery Office.
- Frank Lionel James Dolman, Training Service Officer, Grade I, Government Training Centre and Rehabilitation Unit, Waddon, Ministry of Labour.
- Isobel Dowds, lately Chairman, Streets Savings Committee, Londonderry.
- Percy Dowson, JP, Headmaster, Longbenton Boys' County Secondary School, Newcastle upon Tyne.
- Helena Violet Drake, Headmistress, Summerbee County Primary School, Bournemouth.
- Edith Audrey Drew, Supervisor, Women's Voluntary Service, Royal Air Force, Sylt, Germany.
- Marion Moodie Drysdale, Administrative Officer, Scottish Agricultural Organisation Society Ltd.
- Thomas Duffy, Chief Photographer, Ministry of Agriculture, Fisheries and Food.
- Charles Horace Dunster, Senior Executive Officer, Foreign Office.
- Sidney Arthur Durrant, Superintendent, Land Charges and Agricultural Credit Department, HM Land Registry.
- Elizabeth Collins Eastlake, Member, Welfare Section, Civil Defence Corps, Northumberland Division.
- John James Edgar, Senior Traffic Examiner, Northern Traffic Area, Ministry of Transport.
- Joseph Edgar, Area Officer, National Assistance Board, Northern Ireland.
- Elizabeth Bickerton Edwards, County Organiser, North Pembrokeshire, Women's Voluntary Service.
- Harold William Elias, Grade 4 Officer, Ministry of Labour.
- Donald Ellis, Senior Assistant District Auditor, Ministry of Housing and Local Government.
- Mervyn Evans, Chairman, Walsall and District War Pensions Committee.
- Vincent Evans, JP, Manager (Administration), BP Refinery (Llandarcy), Ltd., Neath, Glamorgan.
- William Abraham Evans, MC, JP, Member representing Denbighshire, National Savings Assembly.
- William Alfred Evetts, MC, Lately Divisional Engineer, Watford Division, Eastern Gas Board.
- Ernest James Excell. For services to Physical Education and Sport in Welsh Schools.
- William Stewart Fairbairn. For political and public services in Bishop Auckland.
- Frederick James Farrell, Senior Executive Officer, Ministry of Agriculture, Fisheries and Food.
- Euphemia Ferguson. For political services in the West of Scotland.
- Norman Frederick Finn, Senior Assistant Land Commissioner, Ministry of Agriculture, Fisheries and Food.
- Thomas John Ford, Founder Member, Hamilton Branch, British Legion, Scotland.
- Henry Geoffrey Dinorbyn Gabriel, Regional Commissioner, South Eastern Region, National Savings Committee.
- John Clifford Gale, Director and Sales Manager, Petters, Ltd., Staines, Middlesex.
- Robin John Garland, Clerk to the Hambledon Rural District Council, Surrey.
- William Joseph Garratt, JP. For public services in Staffordshire.
- Charles Joseph Gayton, Higher Executive Officer, War Damage Commission.
- Jean Wallace Geddes, Head Teacher, Phoenix Park Nursery School, Glasgow.
- Gerard Henry Geilern, Senior Warning Officer, York, United Kingdom Warning Organisation.
- Jean Margaret Genese, Assistant Secretary Royal Forestry Society of England and Wales.
- The Reverend Spencer Walter Gerhold, Rector, S. Pierre Du Bois, Guernsey, Channel Islands. For public services in Guernsey.
- John McDonald Frame Gibson, Chairman, East Renfrewshire Savings Committee.
- Thomas Arthur Gibson, Clerk and Chief Fishery Officer, South Wales Sea Fisheries District Committee.
- Alderman John William Gill, Chairman, Ossett Local Savings Committee.
- Doris May Glenny. For political and public services in Barking.
- Leslie John Goodbourn, Assistant Chief Constable, West Sussex Constabulary.
- Charles Reginald Goodchild, Librarian, Seafarers' Education Service and College of the Sea.
- Observer Lieutenant Alfred James Gothorp, Duty Controller, No 15 Group, Royal Observer Corps.
- Hilda Martha Greaves. For political services in Nottingham.
- Ena Kathleen Green, Executive Officer, Ministry of Education.
- Frederick George Green, Executive Officer, Commonwealth Relations Office.
- Sidney Norman Green, Acting Chief Supervisor of Aircraft Repair, Royal Naval Aircraft Yard, Belfast.
- William Eric Greenwood, JP, Chairman, Boston Youth Employment Committee.
- John McEwan Grieve, Clerical Officer, National Library for Scotland.
- George Boris Gurevitch, Junior Civil Assistant, Headquarters Land Forces, Hong Kong, War Office.
- Joseph Bernard Hadfield, Chief of Admiralty Machinery Design Department, Wallsend Slipway & Engineering Co. Ltd., Wallsend-on-Tyne.
- Percival Walter Haine, Command Architect, Southern Command, War Office.
- Frederick John Colby Haines, Engineer-in-Charge (Sound), Cardiff, British Broadcasting Corporation.
- Edgar Blackmore Hale, Higher Executive Officer, Board of Customs and Excise.
- Harold Edwin Hall, Designer, Armament Drawing Office, Vickers-Armstrongs (Engineers), Ltd., Barrow-in-Furness.
- Muriel Hankins, Executive Officer, Commonwealth Relations Office.
- Jennie Hanna. For public and charitable services in Bangor, County Down.
- Ernest Victor Hardaker, MC, Divisional Electrical Engineer, Midlands Division, Central Electricity Generating Board.
- George Travis Hargreaves, Intelligence Officer, Grade I, British Services Security Organisation, Germany.
- Joseph Harper, Senior Executive Officer, Ministry of Agriculture, Fisheries and Food.
- George Albert Harris, MVO, Chief Clerk, Central Chancery of the Orders of Knighthood.
- Henry Hartford, Higher Executive Officer, National Assistance Board.
- Donald William Harvey. For political services in Cirencester and Tewkesbury.
- George Thomas Harvey, JP, Chairman, Aberdare Local Savings Committee.
- Harry Albert Haskell, Chairman, Guildford and District War Pensions Committee.
- Edgar Warmiington Hawken, Senior Executive Officer, Air Ministry.
- Percy James Hayden, lately Assistant Official Receiver, Board of Trade.
- Godfrey Haynes, Works Manager, Tyer & Co. Ltd., Guildford.
- Harry Head, Trawler Skipper, Lowestoft.
- James Gerald Heaps, Chief of Test and Inspection, Ferranti, Ltd., Wythenshawe.
- James Hugh Helm, Chief Officer, Isle of Ely Fire Brigade.
- Elizabeth Patricia Henderson. For political and public services in Glasgow.
- Lieutenant-Colonel Herbert Richard Hextall, Civil Defence Officer, Mersey Group, North Western Gas Board, Liverpool.
- Edward Alfred Rutkin Hibbitt, Divisional Officer, Surrey County Fire Brigade.
- Jack Hicham, General Secretary, National Union of Stove, Grate and General Metal Workers.
- Dorothy Gwendolen Hillier, formerly Head of Adoption Department, Church of England Children's Society.
- Robert Herringham Hole, Chairman, Lymington Community Association, Hampshire.
- Harold Francis Hollands, Clerical Officer, Telecommunications Engineering Establishment, Ministry of Aviation.
- Sarah Mrs Holliday, BEM, Member representing Newcastle upon Tyne, National Savings Assembly.
- Squadron Leader Frank Bertram Holt, Chairman of Committee, No 1263 (Rochdale) Squadron, Air Training Corps.
- William Henry Homer, District Surveyor, Ministry of Works.
- Herbert George Hookham, National Assistance Board Member, North-East Glamorgan Advisory Committee.
- Margaret Cecilia Horn. For political and public services in Northumberland.
- Cecil Martin Houghton, Farmer, Moulsoe, Buckinghamshire.
- Henry Ernest Howlett, Chief Superintendent, Metropolitan Police.
- Frederick Ernest Huckfield, Assistant Engineer, Telephone Manager's Office, Gloucester.
- Hugh James Hughes, Inspector of Taxes (Higher Grade), Board of Inland Revenue.
- Anne Cecilia Hunter, Executive Officer, Foreign Office.
- Lilian White Hutchinson, Area Child Care Officer, City of Birmingham Children's Department.
- James Hutton, Manager, Personnel Services, Scottish Group, Stewarts & Lloyds, Ltd.
- John Woodward Hyslop, Provost of Langholm, Dumfriesshire.
- John Innes, Chief Sanitary Inspector, Paisley.
- Samuel Wesley Irvine, District Inspector, Royal Ulster Constabulary.
- James Jackman, County Staff Officer, Cornwall, St. John Ambulance Brigade.
- John Thomas Jackson, Group Works Engineer, Joseph Lucas Ltd., Birmingham.
- Reginald Northcott James, Engineer II, Ministry of Aviation.
- Captain Edwin Norman Jennings, DFC, Operations Manager, British United Airways, Ltd.
- Lilian Margaret Georgina Jones, JP, County Chairman, Carmarthenshire, National Federation of Women's Institutes.
- Richard Glynne Jones, Livestock Husbandry Advisory Officer, Grade II, Ministry of Agriculture, Fisheries and Food.
- Frances Mary Keene. Attached War Office.
- Edward Coleby Kidson, lately Chief Estimator, Silley Cox & Co. Ltd., Falmouth.
- Rhona Constance Lamb, Regional Civil Defence Organiser, Birmingham, Women's Voluntary Service.
- Henry Ernest Langley, Senior Executive Officer, Air Ministry.
- Ernest Victor Law, Chairman, British Limbless Ex-Servicemen's Association.
- John Wallace Lea, Senior Examiner, Board of Inland Revenue.
- Edwin Lees, Member representing East Surrey National Savings Assembly.
- Francis Leggatt, Voluntary Social Worker, Renfrewshire.
- Isaac Wyper Leiper, DFC, Tripartite Coal Supplies Officer, British Forces Germany, War Office.
- Olive Marjorie Le Poidevin. For political and public services in Kingston upon Thames.
- George Herbert William Lewis, Senior Executive Officer, Ministry of Housing and Local Government.
- Tom Lonsdale, Manager, Hove, National Assistance Board.
- Bertram John Loudon, Area Superintendent, Levant Area, Commonwealth War Graves Commission.
- John Francis Lucas, Principal Station Radio Officer, Government Communications Headquarters.
- Nancy Dewar Lunan, Organiser, British Red Cross Society(Scottish Branch) Library Service.
- William Sellar MacCunn, lately General Secretary, Bluecoat Society of Arts, Liverpool.
- Percy McDermid, Information Officer, Central Office of Information.
- The Reverend Robert John M'Ilmoyle. For services to agriculture in Northern Ireland.
- Kenneth MacIntyre, Experimental Officer, Chemical Inspectorate, War Office, formerly Ministry of Aviation.
- Edward Dishington McKay. For political services in Glasgow.
- Maurice Edwin William Mackenzie, Senior Executive Officer, Forestry Commission (Scotland).
- Dora Annis Mackintosh, lately Head of the Typing Pool, Corporation of London.
- Janet Carmichael Macleod. For political services in Argyll.
- Mary Isabel Macleod, Higher Executive Officer, Telephone Manager's Office, Glasgow.
- Margaret McNally, Matron, Braid Valley Hospital, Ballymena.
- Charlotte Anderson McPherson, Headmistress, Royal National Orthopaedic Hospital School, Stanmore.
- Phyllis Emily Dorothea Maddy. For public services in Gloucestershire.
- Sister Julie Marie (Margaret Valentia Gillespie), Head Teacher, St. Patrick's Roman Catholic Primary School, Dumbarton.
- Florence Mabel Marsh, Divisional President, Hendon and Finchley Division, Middlesex Branch, British Red Cross Society.
- Ada Annie Marson, Ward Sister, Langthorne Hospital, Leytonstone.
- Colin MacGregor Martin, Director, Needlework Development Scheme.
- Hilda Maude Martin, Personal Secretary, Grade II, Office of the United Kingdom Trade Commissioner in East Africa.
- George Bernard Mason, Staff Photographer, The National Buildings Record.
- Charles Harold Meigh, Managing Director, Meigh Castings, Ltd., Cheltenham.
- Dorothy Hicks Mercer, Executive Officer, National Physical Laboratory, Department of Scientific and Industrial Research.
- John Stuart Mill, Assistant County Commissioner, Boy Scouts Association, West Glamorgan.
- Albert Edward Mills, JP, Warden, Tawd Vale Camp Site, Boy Scouts Association, Lancashire.
- Beryl Auston Millward, lately Secretary to successive Mayors of Winchester City.
- John Canning Mitchell. For political services in Londonderry.
- Reginald Charles Graves Molland, Chairman, Newton Abbot Savings Committee.
- William Ernest Monkley, Senior Executive Officer, Ministry of Pensions and National Insurance.
- Dolores Malita de Rohan Monreal, Executive Officer, Commonwealth Relations Office.
- Frederick Hill Moore, lately Senior Executive Officer, Board of Trade.
- Group Captain Whitworth Archibald Cecil Morgan, MC, Divisional Accident Prevention Organiser, Eastern Division, Royal Society for the Prevention of Accidents.
- Ada Florence Mary Murphy, Executive Officer, Board of Trade.
- Major William Myers, MC, DCM, Secretary and Treasurer, Royal Northumberland Fusiliers Regimental Aid Society and Regimental Association.
- James Tears Myles, Mill General Manager, Tullis Russell & Co. Ltd., Markinch, Fife.
- Philip Nash, Higher Executive Officer, War Office.
- Walter James Neal, Chief Fire Officer, Atomic Energy Research Establishment, Harwell.
- George Mather Neil. For political services in Stockport.
- Frederick Ernest Newnham, Secretary, East Sussex County Branch, National Farmers' Union.
- Victor John Neyle, Engineer II, Aeroplane and Armament Experimental Establishment, Ministry of Aviation.
- James Bruce Nicolson, Civil Defence Officer, Renfrewshire.
- Jan Niedenthal, Executive Officer, Ministry of Education.
- Edward Nolan, Commodore Chief Engineer, Britain Steamship Co. Ltd., London.
- William Henry Norwood, Senior Executive Officer, No 14 Maintenance Unit, Royal Air Force, Carlisle.
- Edwin Arthur Oldfield, Superintendent, Royal Courts of Justice.
- Cyril Thomas Pack, Assistant Postmaster, Huntingdon.
- Cyril Charles Packham, Senior Executive Officer, Admiralty.
- Robert Parkin, Higher Executive Officer, War Office.
- Major Reginald Edward James Parsons. For political services in Southend and London.
- William Hyslop Paul, Divisional Officer, Liverpool Fire Brigade.
- Evelyn Lucy Peacock. For political and public services in Wandsworth.
- Wilfrid James Bell Pearson, Chief Superintendent, Durham County Constabulary.
- Cecil Charles Major Penn, Senior Executive Officer, Ministry of Pensions and National Insurance.
- Margaret Carey Penny, Housing Manager, Hemel Hempstead Development Corporation.
- Captain Evan Llewelyn Phillips, Relieving Master, Palm Line, Ltd., London.
- Reginald Charles Phillips, Administrative Official, Accounts Department, Navy, Army and Air Force Institutes.
- Wilfrid Pickles, Honorary Financial Secretary, Durham County, British Legion.
- Charles William George Pidgeon, Secretary, Devonport Local Committee, Royal Naval Benevolent Trust.
- Henry Lawrence Pilkington, Manager, Quality Staff, David Brown Industries, Ltd., Huddersfield.
- Leslie Strathmore Finder, Chief Engineer, Nuffield Talking Book Library for the Blind.
- Henry Percival Player, Member, Kent River Board and Rother Drainage Board.
- Frederick Cyril Polkinghorne, Chief Foreman of Works, HM Dockyard, Portsmouth.
- Eveline May Porter. For political and public services in Herefordshire.
- Amy Winifred Pottinger, Divisional Honorary Secretary, Derby Soldiers', Sailors' and Airmen's Families Association.
- Gordon Duff Powell, Legal Assistant, Ministry of Pensions and National Insurance.
- Harold Hamilton Powell, Architect, Eastern Region, British Railways.
- George Joseph Pratt, lately Executive Officer, Air Ministry.
- Henry Evan Price, Chief Commander, Birmingham Special Constabulary.
- Thomas Ashley Priest, Chief Draughtsman, Admiralty.
- Edward Charles Pullen, DCM, Staff Officer, Board of Inland Revenue.
- Edward Walter Raby, lately Deputy Chief Accountant, Yorkshire Electricity Board.
- Joyce May Casson Rainbow, Assistant, Programme Contracts Department, British Broadcasting Corporation.
- Edward Hunter Ramage, Director, Sir Robert McAlpine & Sons (South Wales), Ltd.
- Bert Rawlings, Technical Grade I, Royal Aircraft Establishment, Bedford, Ministry of Aviation.
- Austin Rawlinson. For services to Amateur Swimming.
- Jean Wilcox Anderson Reaper, Higher Executive Officer, Scottish Savings Committee.
- Robert Reid Rennie, Higher Executive Officer, Scottish Home Department.
- Charles Henry Reynolds. For political services in Cardiff.
- Louis John Victor Reynolds, Assistant Repair Manager, John I. Thornycroft & Co. Ltd., Southampton.
- Christina Phyllis Rice, JP. For political and public services in Pembrokeshire.
- Ronald Dean Roberts. For political and public services in the West Riding of Yorkshire.
- William Robertson, Senior Executive Officer, Department of Health for Scotland.
- Elspeth Constance Ogilvie Robinson, Deputy General Secretary, United Kingdom Committee for the World Refugee Year.
- Max Robinson, Deputy County Commissioner, Manchester County, Boy Scouts' Association.
- William Leslie Roe, Chief Metallurgist, Aiton & Co. Ltd., Derby.
- Reginald Percy Rogers, Director and General Manager, Unit Tool & Engineering Company Ltd., Blackpool.
- Horace William Rose, Higher Executive Officer, Air Ministry.
- Duncan Ross, Head Forester, Glen Tanar Estate.
- Harold Stanley Albert Rothon, JP. For political and public services in Billericay.
- Olive Mary Round, Secretary, Oxford University Air Squadron.
- Elizabeth Rowbottom, JP. For public services in Wakefield.
- Frederick Bryan Lys Sall, Main Grade Engineer, Foreign Office.
- Cyril Sanders, Senior Experimental Officer, Atomic Energy Research Establishment, Harwell.
- George Percival Sanderson. For political services in Galloway.
- Cecilia Mary Savage, lately Chief Superintendent of Typists, Export Credits Guarantee Department.
- James McIldoon Scott, Executive Representative, Northern Ireland, Plumbing Trades Union.
- Janet Scott, Supervisor, Church of Scotland Canteen, Horns, Tripolitania.
- John Christopher Scott, Chairman, Keighley National Assistance Appeal Tribunal.
- Mary Marion Wands Scott, Head, Secretarial Training School, British Broadcasting Corporation.
- Joe Eric Scurrah, Finance Officer, British Wool Marketing Board.
- Captain George Albert Sherman, District Superintendent, East Cowes, Corporation of Trinity House.
- Stuart George Shilson, Higher Executive Officer, Ministry of Works.
- Catherine Edwina Shrimpton, Clerical Officer Secretary, Colonial Office.
- Frederick John Shutt, HM Inspector of Mines and Quarries, South Western Division, Ministry of Power.
- Harry Simpson, Senior Ship Surveyor, Marine Survey Office, Liverpool, Ministry of Transport.
- William Simpson, Member, Perth Local Savings Committee.
- Greta Mary Sissons, Branch Secretary, East Riding of Yorkshire Branch, British Red Cross Society.
- Fred Smedley, District Engineer, Bathgate District, South of Scotland Electricity Board.
- Constance Rachel Smith, Clerical Officer, Royal Naval Barracks, Portsmouth.
- Margaret Macdonald Smith, Higher Executive Officer, Ministry of Pensions and National Insurance.
- William Smith, Director of Public Cleansing, Wigan.
- Harold George Cooke Snoad, Clerical Officer, Headquarters Eastern Command, War Office.
- Nina Mary Soans. For political services in Kettering.
- Jesse Spyer, Organist and Choir Master, Royal Military Memorial Chapel, Sandhurst.
- Albert Woodford Stainer, Honorary Secretary, Cowes Savings Committee.
- Charles Walter Stevens, Secretary, National Federation of Corn Trade Associations.
- William Ralph Stone, Chief Superintendent, Metropolitan Police.
- Sheana Mary Strachan, Conference Officer, Grade 2, Foreign Office.
- Ellen Street, Centre Organiser, Deptford, Women's Voluntary Service.
- Howard Thomas James Stubley, Grade 4 Officer, North Midlands Regional Office, Ministry of Labour.
- Thomas Ernest Styles, Honorary County Secretary, Worcestershire, British Legion.
- Charles Denis Davies Suffern, Honorary Secretary, Ulster Operatic Company.
- John Leslie Swain, JP, Chairman, Northallerton, Scarborough and District War Pensions Committee.
- Jessie May Sweet, Senior Experimental Officer, British Museum (Natural History).
- Reginald Whitby Swinson, General Secretary, Variety Artistes' Federation.
- Charles John Syvret, lately Engineer-Manager, States of Jersey Telephone Department.
- George Stanley Taylerson, Senior Executive Officer, Ministry of Health.
- Alfred John Taylor, Experimental Works Manager, Dowty Rotol, Ltd., Cheltenham.
- Royston George Taylor, General Manager, C. & N. (Electrical), Ltd., Gosport.
- Samuel William Taylor. For political services in Brighton.
- Edward Tee, Senior Surveyor, Lloyd's Register of Shipping in Poland.
- Percy Thomas, District Officer, HM Coastguard, Tynemouth, Northumberland.
- Lilian Doris Thompson, JP. For political services in Blackpool.
- Willie Thornton, Chief Engineer, D. Morgan Rees & Sons, Ltd., Cardiff.
- Grace Irene Tidman, Assistant Mistress, South Street Junior Mixed County Primary School, Bristol.
- Clifford John Tirrell, Honorary Treasurer, Association of Teachers in Technical Institutions.
- Terence Austin Tolley, Director and Works Manager, Brintons, Ltd., Kidderminster.
- Martin Robert Tollow, Senior Executive Officer, Office of HM Procurator-General and Treasury Solicitor.
- Thomas Towers, Founder of a Boys' Club, Hinckley, Leicestershire.
- Frederick Roland Trust, Divisional Officer (Senior Staff Officer), London Fire Brigade.
- Edna Ruth Tull, Executive Officer, HM Treasury.
- Eric Harold Turner, Senior Executive Officer, Board of Customs and Excise.
- Herbert William Turner, Chairman, Colchester, Harwich and District War Pensions Committee.
- Surgeon Captain Thomas Turner, VRD, MB, MRCS, Royal Naval Volunteer Reserve (retired), Chairman, Eastbourne Sea Cadet Corps Unit.
- Elizabeth Underwood, Matron, Luxborough Lodge, London County Council.
- Albert Edward Verdon, Higher Executive Officer, Ministry of Pensions and National Insurance.
- Caroline Joyce Vooght, Ward Sister, Moorhaven Hospital, Ivybridge.
- William John Wakefield, Clerical Officer, Regimental Depot, The Gloucestershire Regiment.
- William Stephen Walker, Senior Draughtsman HM Dockyard, Chatham.
- Nancy Edith Wallace, Grade 3 Officer, Branch B, Foreign Office.
- Bernard Ward, JP, Chairman, Halifax Local Employment Committee.
- Major Dan Parker Ward, Chairman, West Riding County Committee, British Legion.
- Cyril Ernest Warden, lately Senior Executive Officer, Ministry of Agriculture, Fisheries and Food.
- Harold Warren, Member and Past Chairman, Milk Sub-Committee, Derby County Agricultural Executive Committee.
- John Fone Warren, Inspector of Taxes (Higher Grade), Board of Inland Revenue.
- Horace Aubrey Warton, lately Senior Executive Officer, General Post Office.
- Kenneth Stevenson Waterman, Senior Draughtsman, Ministry of Defence.
- Frank Watson, Head Forester, Forestry Commission.
- Herbert Walter Cecil Wernham, District Superintendent, Mercantile Marine Office, Southampton, Ministry of Transport.
- Herbert Leslie Westoby, Actuary, Surrey Trustee Savings Bank.
- Walter Harold White, Clerk of Works, Chief Engineer's Department, North Thames Gas Board.
- Henry Whiteside, Chairman, Haydock Local Savings Committee.
- Catherine Marshall Whyte, Sister in Charge, Sick Staff Ward, West Middlesex Hospital, Isleworth.
- William Arthur Williams, TD, Senior Executive Officer, War Office.
- Charles William Wilson, Superintendent, Head Post Office, Newcastle upon Tyne.
- Clifford Wilson, Senior Executive Officer, Ministry of Pensions and National Insurance.
- Denis Scott Wilson, Senior Scientific Intelligence Officer, Civil Defence Corps, Croydon.
- Joyce Wilson. For political services in Edinburgh.
- Henry Alfred Woodcraft, JP, Trades Union Member, Eastern Regional Board for Industry.
- Henry Saville Woodham. For political services.
- John Worthington, Deputy Chairman, North Liverpool Hospital Management Committee.
- Sarah Cryer Wright, Member, Committee of Voluntary Workers, Child Welfare Centre, Smethwick County Borough.
- Alexander Robert Wylie, Supervisor of Farms and Gardens, Prison Commission.
- Captain Thomas Young, lately Master, Salvage Vessel Twyford. For services in salvage operations for the recovery of an aircraft lost at sea.
- William Alan Custance Baker, lately British Council Representative, Berlin.
- Lawrence Alfred Percival Barker, lately First Secretary and Consul, Her Majesty's Embassy, Port-au-Prince.
- Edward James Beattie, Assistant Accountant, Her Majesty's Embassy, Washington.
- Kelly Chan Kwai Yuen, Clerk, Office of the United Kingdom Commissioner-General for South-Eaat Asia, Singapore.
- Margaret Anne Cole, British Council Librarian, Madrid.
- Arthur Ernest Eaton, DSO, British subject resident in France.
- Luella Ovenstone Gellatly, Lady Warden, Missions to Seamen, Rotterdam.
- Hilda Gibson, British subject resident in El Salvador.
- Mary Isobel Gordon, Shorthand-typist, Her Majesty's Embassy, Tokyo.
- George Hay, lately Archivist, Her Majesty's Embassy, Moscow.
- George Turner Hodgson, British Consul, Concepcion.
- Elizabeth Callaghan Keith, British subject resident in the United States of America.
- Fay Barbara Lemberger, British subject resident in Monaco.
- Lieutenant-Colonel John Arthur McKay, Her Majesty's Consul, Medan.
- Henry Odell McNeice, Expert attached to Posts, Telegraph and Telecommunications Department, Kuwait.
- Randolph Murray Miller, British subject resident in Norway.
- Eleanor Oldham, British subject resident in Brazil.
- George Harold Ong, British Pro-Consul, Surabaya.
- John William Ray, Market Officer, Commercial Secretariat, Her Majesty's Embassy, Lima.
- Arthur Wright Rhodes, Temporary Grade 4 Officer in Branch "B" of the Foreign Service, Her Majesty's Embassy, Bonn.
- Walter Rhodes, Legal Adviser, Her Majesty's Embassy, Vienna.
- Daisy Margaret Scholander, British subject resident in Sweden.
- John Bruce Smith, Clerical Officer, Her Majesty's Embassy, Phnom Penh.
- Arthur George Aston Spiller, British Pro-Consul, Buenos Aires.
- Richard Ernest Webb, Head of Reference and Library Division, British Information Services, New York.
- Oscar Arnheim, Medical Officer, Medical Departmeat, Swaziland.
- Celia Mary Bancroft, of Indooroopilly, State of Queensland, a representative of the pioneer women.
- Dorothy Banks, a member of the United Kingdom community in Madras, India.
- John Stewart Blackburn, of Adelaide, State of South Australia. For services to the Blind.
- William Joseph Borden, a Councillor of the Shire of Donald, State of Victoria.
- William Edward Britcliffe, JP. For services to the Esperance Municipality, State of Tasmania.
- Ethel Mary Brookes, State Matron, Selangor, Federation of Malaya.
- Amy Katharine Bullock, Nursing Superintendent for the State of Assam, India.
- Harold William Cheers, of Kingaroy, State of Queensland. For services to the dairying industry.
- Bertie Stuart Baxter Cook. For services to Journalism in the State of Victoria.
- Harley James Daley, Town Clerk of Campbelltown, and President of the Local Government Clerks' Association, State of New South Wales.
- John Davies, a Councillor of the Shire of South Gippsland, State of Victoria.
- Ethel Sarah Durham, of Coonamble, State of New South Wales. For social welfare services.
- Christiaan Gabriel du Toit, Surveyor, Bechuanaland Protectorate.
- Walter Finigan, Senior Vice-President of the Gould League of Bird Lovers, State of New South Wales.
- Douglas Garner, Clerk, Department of Housing, Southern Rhodesia.
- Frederick Joseph Gibbons. For services to the Blind in the State of South Australia.
- Irene Maud Gibson, of Sydney, State of New South Wales. For services to Music.
- Christine Adelaide Gilchrist, Matron, Marrickville District Hospital, State of New South Wales.
- Frances Mary Gillespie, President, Rachel Forster Hospital for Women and Children, State of New South Wales.
- Elizabeth Amanda Margarethe Goodall, Artist and Museum Worker, Southern Rhodesia.
- Alfred Hannaford. For services to primary producers, State of South Australia.
- Lancelot Edward Hoban. For services to charitable movements in the State of New South Wales.
- George Norman Patrick Hodder, a member of the United Kingdom community in Calcutta, India.
- Edith May Hooper, Principal Matron, Ministry of Health and Social Welfare, Federation of Malaya.
- Arthur Bert Jefferies, Superintendent of Police, Federation of Malaya.
- John Philip Jessop, a member of the United Kingdom community in Karachi, Pakistan.
- James Ramsay John, formerly a member of the United Kingdom community in Ghana.
- Norah Ethel John, National President, National Council of Women of Southern Rhodesia.
- Reuben Sefatsa Lesenyeho, Chief Finance Supervisor, Department of Local Government, Basutoland.
- Joshua Lukele, Treasurer, Swazi National Treasury, Swaziland.
- Richard Donald Malcolmson. For services to social welfare and charitable movements in the State of Victoria.
- Sophia Maudsley. For public services in the State of Victoria.
- Winifred Mabel McGee, formerly Secretary, Plumtree Town Management Board, Southern Rhodesia.
- Arthur McGuinness, formerly President, Board of Stewart House Preventorium, State of New South Wales.
- Henry Robert Middleton, Superintendent of Police, Federation of Malaya.
- Canon William Philip Burrill Miles, a member of the Church of England clergy in Brisbane and district, State of Queensland, for many years.
- Chief Mokgosi Seboko Mokgosi, of the Bamalete Tribe, Bechuanaland Protectorate.
- Norris Alfred Neal, ED, General Secretary, Motor Traders' Association, State of New South Wales.
- John Alfred Gavin O'Dea, of Devonport, State of Tasmania. For services to the community.
- Trevor Edward Owen, formerly Superintendent of Police, Federation of Malaya.
- Archibald Edward Paton, a Councillor of the Shire of Minhamite, State of Victoria.
- Anthony Joseph Pillay. For social welfare services in Southern Rhodesia.
- Monica Catherine Powell, Matron, Mt. Henry Women's Home, State of Western Australia.
- John Henry Norman Price, MC, Chairman, Cleveland Shire Council, State of Queensland.
- Sydney Ravenswood Ricketts, Past President, Royal Automobile Club, State of Queensland.
- The Reverend Oliver Somkence, of the Mpopoma African Township, Southern Rhodesia.
- Ethel Maud Thomas. For services to charitable and social welfare organisations in the State of Western Australia.
- Roger Thornton, a Farmer in Southern Rhodesia.
- David Ernest Trumpy, MB, BS, Medical Superintendent, Ipswich Hospital, State of Queensland.
- Gordon Stoddard Boyd Varty, Senior Assistant Agricultural Officer, Swaziland.
- Peter Bertram Gerard Waller, Superintendent of Police, Federation of Malaya.
- Ian Stewart Williams, Town Clerk, Temora, State of New South Wales.
- Euphemia Ruth Willshire, of Millicent, State of South Australia. For social welfare services.
- Panglima Abdullah bin Panglima Udang, District Chief, North Borneo.
- Josephine Maud Hutchings, Lady Aga. For services to the Girl Guide movement in Jamaica and the Turks and Caicos Islands.
- Robina Angus, Matron-in-Chief, Uganda.
- John Richard Austin, Registrar of Cooperative Societies, Southern Cameroons.
- Frances May Ruth Baerlein. For public services in Uganda.
- Amy Beckford Bailey. For social services in Jamaica.
- Margery Louise Beeching, Supervising Secretary Typist, Sierra Leone.
- Alexander Colin Blair. For public services in the British Solomon Islands Protectorate.
- James William Breen, Deputy Superintendent of Police, Aden.
- Philip John Bull, JP. For public services in Fiji.
- John Bully, Accountant-General, The West Indies.
- Jamshed Dinshaw Byramjee. For social services in Kenya.
- Doris Eunice Cartwright, Senior Woman Education Officer, Northern Rhodesia.
- Floss Casasola. For public services in British Honduras.
- Alexander Chalmers, Area Manager, Agricultural Production and Marketing Board, Lilongwe, Nyasaland.
- Alexander Chetcuti. For public services in Malta.
- Shin Sen Chin, Principal Assistant Secretary (Training), Sarawak.
- John Clinton, Assistant Secretary, Gibraltar.
- Abayomi Bismarck Cole, lately Health Superintendent, Sierra Leone.
- Arthur Simpson Kingsbury Cook, Senior Assistant Commissioner of Police, Uganda.
- Harold Victor Crosse, Senior Executive Officer, Crown Agents for Oversea Governments and Administrations.
- Joseph Curmi, Airport Manager, Luqa Airport, Malta.
- Urbanie Marie Deweerdt, Sister Mary Borgia of the Missionary Cannonesses of St. Augustine, Dominica.
- Mona Olga Eastwick. For public services in Nyasaland.
- Paul Bingham Elwell, DFC. For services to aviation in East Africa.
- Latilewa Hyde-Forster. For services to education in Sierra Leone.
- Dennis Frederick Harold Hyde Frost, District Commissioner, Kawambwa, Northern Rhodesia.
- Edna George, lately Senior Sister Tutor, Singapore.
- Michael Gillett, Senior Field Officer (Veterinary), Tanganyika.
- Nicol Campbell Gillies, Assistant Director of Public Works in the former Somaliland Protectorate.
- George Washington Gilpin, lately Senior Traffic Inspector, Sierra Leone.
- Fakir Chand Gosani, Clerk, East African Railways and Harbours.
- Penelope Milnes Gray. For public services in North Borneo.
- Paul Griffin, lately Principal, English School, Nicosia, Cyprus.
- Gwilym Gwynne, Senior Superintendent of Works (Civil), Sierra Leone.
- Claude Vyvian Digby Hadley, Education Officer, St. Vincent.
- Nicholas Brian Hanmer, Senior Administrative Officer in the former Somaliland Protectorate.
- John Henderson. For public services in Uganda.
- Bertha Higgins. For public services in Antigua.
- Margaret Rebecca Hodson. For public services in Barbados.
- Thaddeus Arthur Hollis, lately Inspector of Produce, Department of Agriculture, Bermuda.
- Enid Mary Hopkins, British Red Cross Field Officer, Kenya.
- Felix Mederic Houareau, Superintendent of Prisons, Seychelles.
- Mary Dyce Kenny, Probation Officer, Kenya.
- Mohamed Khan, Assistant Wharf Superintendent, Aden Port Trust.
- Valentine Gilbert Lashley, Acting Senior Superintendent of Police, Trinidad.
- Abdul Rahim Luqman, Principal, Secondary School, Aden.
- Elena Rose Jeannette, Lady McKisack, Branch Director, British Red Cross in Uganda.
- Norman Main. For public services in Tanganyika.
- Henry Fairlie Makulu. For public services in Northern Rhodesia.
- James Alexander Elliott Martin. For public services in Singapore.
- John Reginald Middleton, Superintendent of Police, Jamaica.
- John William Morison, lately General Manager, Electricity Authority of Cyprus.
- Paul Norbert, Liwali Mkuu of Lindi District, Tanganyika.
- Petero William Oola, Rwot (County Chief) of Omoro, Acholi District, Uganda.
- Hagop Hovhannes Palamoudian. For services to the Scout movement in Cyprus.
- Frederick Archibald Passells, Director of Social Services and Housing, Nairobi City Council, Kenya.
- Ernest Frederick Pickwell, Senior Sectional Engineer, East Africa High Commission.
- William Clarence Priestner, Works Superintendent (Water Supply), Public Works Department, Southern Cameroons.
- Mathew Douglas Ramadhani, Education Officer, Tanganyika.
- Leonard Aubrey Rapier. For public services in Grenada.
- Bernard Ulric Joseph Rodrigues, Senior Auditor, British Guiana.
- Cromwell George St. Louis, Acting Senior Superintendent of Police, Trinidad.
- Harold Shepherd, Secretary to the Law Society of Northern Rhodesia.
- Iqbal Singh, Legal Assistant in the former Somaliland Protectorate.
- Easton Gerard Soutar, Deputy Clerk of the Legislature, Jamaica.
- Raymond Leslie Speight, Deputy Superintendent of Police Zanzibar.
- Ernest Leonard Strange, Secretary, Public Works Department, Hong Kong.
- Ralph Masai Sundor. For public services in Kenya.
- Tam Yan-kwong, Land Surveyor Class I, Hong Kong.
- Tengani, Chief of Port Herald District, Nyasaland.
- Yolande Thomasse, Head Teacher, Princess Margaret Special School for handicapped children, Mauritius.
- Evelyn Clare Tracey. For public services in Trinidad.
- James Ridley Tuckett, Agricultural Officer, Tanganyika.
- Frederick Varley. For public services in Tanganyika.
- Lubinda Wamungungo, Chief of the Mwandi District Kuta, Sesheke District, Northern Rhodesia.
- Elsie Whyman. For public services in Northern Rhodesia.
- John Clemensford Wilsden Wickham, Senior Meteorological Assistant, The West Indies.
- Paul Alexander Wood, Assistant Superintendent of Prisons, Kenya.
- Yong Thiam Yin. For public services in North Borneo.

Honorary Member

- Sheikh Hamoud Said Abdulla El-Kharusy, Supervisor of School Buildings, Zanzibar.

=== Order of the Companions of Honour (CH) ===
- Tunku Yang Teramat Mulia Tunku Abdul Rahman Putra Al-haj, Prime Minister of Malaya.
- The Right Honourable Edmund Colquhoun, The Earl of Limerick, GBE, KCB, DSO, TD, Chairman, Medical Research Council.

=== British Empire Medal (BEM) ===
Military Division

Royal Navy

- Chief Petty Officer William Charles Boddy, C/JX 140406, lately seconded to the Royal Malayan Navy.
- Stores Chief Petty Officer (S) Leslie Phillip Boss, D/MX 58617.
- Chief Petty Officer (Gunnery Instructor) Frederick John Bradbury, P/JX 129093.
- Master at Arms Patrick Calnan, D/MX 802075.
- Regimental Sergeant Major William Chisholm, Ply/X 3291.
- Chief Electrician Reginald Thomas Cross, P/MX 802930.
- Chief Petty Officer Ernest Foggin, P/JX 143530.
- Stores Chief Petty Officer (V) William Henry Gidley, D/MK 48856.
- Chief Petty Officer (Gunnery Instructor) David Ernest Gunston, P/JX 150680.
- Chief Engineering Mechanic David William Hallett, P/KX 88885.
- Aircraft Mechanician (A/E) 1st Class Arthur William Howatson Heald, L/FX 80447.
- Chief Petty Officer (Gunnery Instructor) Frank Alfred Edward Hines, P/JX 151977.
- Chief Engine Room Artificer Spencer Alfred Kurd, P/MX 49511.
- Chief Petty Officer (Aircrewman 1st Class) Norman Jarvis, L/FX 80787.
- Chief Petty Officer Cook (O) Arthur William Jones, C/MX 49781.
- Chief Radio Supervisor Richard Kenneth Jones, P/JX 153357.
- Chief Wren Regulating Victoria Keys, 85920, Women's Royal Naval Service.
- Chief Engine Room Artificer William Frederick Mcleod, D/MX 61956.
- Second Lieutenant (SD) (formerly PL/X 4501 Regimental Sergeant Major) Dewi Meurig Morgan, DCM, Royal Marines.
- Chief Petty Officer John Henry Newcombe, C/JX 150489.
- Chief Wren (Welfare) Victoria Lilian Pollard, 41660, Women's Royal Naval Service.
- Chief Engineering Mechanic Glyn Elvet Rees, C/KX 107155.
- Chief Engineroom Artificer Leonard Arthur Smith, P/MX 59055.
- Aircraft Artificer First Class Alfred Percival James Stebbing, L/FX 87924.
- Sick Berth Chief Petty Officer Reginald Frank Suter, P/MX 51398.
- Quartermaster Sergeant John Swanton, Ply/X3262 Royal Marines.
- Chief Petty Officer George Edward Morris Thrift, P/JX 283137.
- Chief Radio Supervisor Leonard Townsend, C/JX 157664.
- Chief Radio Electrician Leslie Ernest Wileman, P/MX 759508.
- Radio Electrical Artificer (Air) 1st Class Herbert Jewster Williams, L/FX 114615.

Army

- S/14188735 Staff-Sergeant Ivor Albert Adkins, Royal Army Service Corps.
- 6535 Sergeant Al-Khader Said Hassani, Aden Protectorate Levies.
- T/22784768 Sergeant John Barron, Royal Army Service Corps, Territorial Army.
- S/2726422 Staff-Sergeant (acting) (now Sergeant) Bernard Connolly, Royal Army Service Corps.
- 22530060 Colour-Sergeant Derek William Cook, The Parachute Regiment, Territorial Army.
- 6345541 Warrant Officer Class II (acting) Frederick Norman Cox, Royal Army Ordnance Corps.
- 22213869 Sergeant (acting) Denis Maxwell Cresswell, Grenadier Guards.
- W/36212 Staff-Sergeant Margaret Louisa Norman Dodds, Women's Royal Army Corps.
- S/3768172 Sergeant Alfred Edward Enshaw, Royal Army Service Corps.
- 22526208 Sergeant John Gardner, Corps of Royal Electrical and Mechanical Engineers.
- 1157474 Staff-Sergeant (acting) (now Sergeant) Arthur Ronald Haines, Corps of Royal Electrical and Mechanical Engineers.
- 14463887 Sergeant Raymond Ashton Hiles, Royal Regiment of Artillery.
- 22054203 Staff-Sergeant (Artillery Clerk) Victor Connel Holdaway, Royal Regiment of Artillery.
- 22776027 Sergeant (acting) (local Warrant Officer Class II) Leslie Howard, Royal Corps of Signals.
- 22305563 Staff-Sergeant (acting) Neil Hubbard, Corps of Royal Electrical and Mechanical Engineers.
- S/2725644 Sergeant Robert Frederick Johnston, Royal Army Service Corps.
- 893130 Staff-Sergeant Windsor John Kemp, Corps of Royal Electrical and Mechanical Engineers.
- 22304257 Staff-Sergeant Samuel Leckey, Royal Regiment of Artillery, Territorial Army.
- 556365 Warrant Officer Class II (acting) Arthur George Legreazley, Army Catering Corps.
- 22976578 Sergeant James Turner Liddell, Corps of Royal Electrical and Mechanical Engineers.
- 22236448 Staff-Sergeant William James Arthur McAuley, Corps of Royal Engineers, Territorial Army.
- 22772930 Sergeant Richard McKeogh, Royal Regiment of Artillery.
- 6916806 Corporal Thomas McLoughlin, 3rd Green Jackets, The Rifle Brigade.
- 22251536 Staff-Sergeant Robert Bailey Munday, Royal Army Ordnance Corps, Territorial Army.
- 22204445 Warrant Officer Class II (acting) Thomas O'Brien, Corps of Royal Military Police.
- 19041875 Staff-Sergeant (Artillery Clerk) John WiMiam Owen, Royal Regiment of Artillery.
- S/14191434 Staff-Sergeant Peter Derek James Owen, Royal Army Service Corps.
- 2740884 Warrant Officer Class II (acting) William John Richard Pierce, Welsh Guards.
- WI/909 Sergeant Westley Lamiston Plummer, 1st Battalion, The West India Regiment.
- 2740110 Warrant Officer Class II (acting) Frederick Herbert Proctor, Welsh Guards.
- 22514008 Staff-Sergeant Walter Ronald Roach, Corps of Royal Electrical and Mechanical Engineers.
- 7600576 Staff-Sergeant Ernest Leonard Roberts, Corps of Royal Electrical and Mechanical Engineers.
- 1427346 Staff-Sergeant (Artillery Clerk) Frederick Charles Roberts, Royal Regiment of Artillery.
- 19054014 Sergeant Albert George Rogers, Corps of Royal Electrical and Mechanical Engineers.
- 22843209 Sergeant Patrick Rumble, Royal Regiment of Artillery.
- 22242279 Staff-Sergeant Norman Lawrance Ryan, Corps of Royal Electrical and Mechanical Engineers.
- 22293180 Sergeant Donald Bryan Sammons, Corps of Royal Electrical and Mechanical Engineers, Territorial Army.
- 6399715 Warrant Officer Class II (acting) Alfred George Selmes, Military Provost Staff Corps.
- HK/18022453 Sergeant (acting) Tang Man, Royal Army Service Corps.
- 22830378 Sergeant Joseph Donald Taylor, Royal Army Pay Corps.
- 22815858 Sergeant (acting) Ian Henry Thomas, Corps of Royal Electrical and Mechanical Engineers.
- 4690601 Warrant Officer Class II (acting) Godfrey Thompson, Army Catering Corps.
- 847125 Warrant Officer Class II (acting) Douglas George Thurston, Army Catering Corps.
- S/22303544 Sergeant Harold Walker, Royal Asmy Service Corps.
- 19046349 Staff-Sergeant Harold Sidney Weaver, Royal Tank Regiment, Royal Armoured Corps.
- 3961558 Colour Sergeant (acting) Thomas John Owen Williams, The Black Watch (Royal Highland Regiment).
- S/21016974 Staff-Sergeant Thomas Charles Willox, Royal Army Service Corps.

In recognition of distinguished service in Malaya for the period 1st January to 31st July 1960.

- 22221487 Colour Sergeant Raymond Henry John Hewitt, 1st East Anglian Regiment (Royal Norfolk and Suffolk).
- 22880393 Sergeant Richard Landy, Army Catering Corps.
- 22550766 Sergeant William Henry Montgomery McEvoy, D.C.M., Royal Army Medical Corps.
- 821430 Sergeant Douglas Ian Mackintosh, The New Zealand Regiment.

Royal Air Force

- 644715 Flight Sergeant George Frederick Anstey.
- 527010 Flight Sergeant Gwilym Bumford.
- 1607918 Flight Sergeant (now Warrant Officer) Frederick George Burnett.
- 536866 Flight Sergeant Kenneth Michael Busby.
- 525721 Flight Sergeant Frederick James Cann.
- 1434587 Flight Sergeant Desmond Duffill, Royal Air Force Regiment.
- 175589 Flight Sergeant William John James Hambly.
- 567754 Flight Sergeant John William Legge.
- 591804 Flight Sergeant Patrick Marshall.
- 641459 Flight Sergeant Thomas Dinning Oakes.
- 619380 Flight Sergeant Frederick Harry Rose.
- 531303 Flight Sergeant Paul Alexander Searle.
- 4046804 Flight Sergeant James Edward Smith.
- 618215 Flight Sergeant William Thompson.
- 953101 Chief Technician John Atkinson.
- 553107 Chief Technician John Edward Dyson.
- 1724463 Chief Technician Leslie Reginald Farley.
- 4004562 Chief Technician Kenneth Thomas Fulford.
- 1562711 Chief Technician George Lawrence.
- 3501204 Chief Technician Douglas Michael John Mackie.
- 548637 Chief Technician Eric Hardcastle Ramshaw.
- 573964 Chief Technician (now Master Technician) Jack Smith.
- 566479 Chief Technician Walter James Smithers.
- 575676 Chief Technician Alexander John Tick.
- 2693501 Acting Flight Sergeant David George Clark, Royal Auxiliary Air Force.
- 4033685 Sergeant Michael Brian David Barraclough, Royal Air Force Regiment.
- 3503275 Sergeant Robert Arthur Barrett.
- 3502533 Sergeant Roy Hardy.
- 4066587 Sergeant Jonathan Richley Hillary.
- 2218912 Sergeant Herbert Roy Howard.
- 575599 Sergeant William Thomas Howard.
- 4004250 Sergeant Alan Jeffrey Keech.
- 634924 Sergeant Thomas Lambourne Latham.
- 3504444 Sergeant Leslie Albert Lawrence.
- 4010544 Sergeant Derek Maisey, Royal Air Force Regiment.
- 1860517 Sergeant Douglas Glen Tilford.
- 541414 Sergeant John Ellis Varey.
- 4011553 Sergeant Richard Bernard Walsh.
- 4031776 Sergeant Charles Edward Wilks.
- 1920924 Senior Technician James Michael Brewster.
- 3503234 Senior Technician Ronald George Holdaway.
- 1920380 Corporal Philip Walter Martell Coomber.
- 4002707 Corporal James Moran Orr.

Civil Division
United Kingdom

- George Harry Anderson, Foreman Gardener, Royal Botanic Gardens, Kew (Richmond).
- Oliver Cyril Baldock, Radio Operator, Government Communications Headquarters, Foreign Office (Taunton, Somerset).
- Norris Barker, Gas Fitter, Keig'hley Undertaking, North Eastern Gas Board (Keighley).
- David Harold Bennett, JP, Repairer, WaunIwyd Colliery, South Western Division, National Coal Board (Ebbw Vale).
- Arthur Stanley Berry, Engineering Technical Class Grade II Foreman, Waltham Abbey, Ministry of Aviation (Waltham Cross).
- Dorothy May Billows, Collector, Kingsley Avenue Street Savings Group, Kettering.
- Louisa Blackburn, Collector, Field Road Savings Group, Wallasey.
- Arthur Donovan Bleach, Inspector, East Sussex Constabulary (Crowborough).
- Bertram Morris Boreham, Warehouseman, Crowson & Son Ltd. (Dagenham, Essex).
- Jean Allan Boyd, Canteen Manageress (Grade "B"), Royal Naval Store Depot, Almondbank, Perth.
- John Boyd, Driller, Medians, Ltd., Glasgow.
- Benjamin George William Braham, Driver (Motor Transport), British Overseas Airways Corporation (London, E.2).
- Jean B. Braid, Honorary Section Commandant, St. Andrew's Ambulance Association, Scottish Co-operative Wholesale Society, Glasgow.
- Horace Broughton, Superintendent of Stores, No. 7 Maintenance Unit, Royal Air Force, Quedgeley.
- Ella Collie Bruce, Matron, Aberdeen Children's Shelter.
- Frederick William Bullen, Carpenter, RMS Caronia, Cunard Steam-Ship Co. Ltd. (Pettswood, Kent).
- Florence Edith Burgess, Assistant to the Regional Clothing Officer, Reading, Women's Voluntary Service.
- Cecil John Carter, Leader of Frenford Clubs, Ilford (Romford, Essex).
- John Carter, Assistant Foreman, Associated Electrical Industries (Manchester) Ltd. (Eccles).
- Carmel Cassano, Garrison Engineer, War Office, Malta.
- Albert Victor George Chalcraft, Depot Chargeman, HM Boom Defence Depot, Sheerness.
- Arthur Reginald Champion, Chief Inspector, Harrow Post Office, Middlesex.
- Alfred Samuel Charley, Senior Range Warden, Royal Naval Rifle Range, Trevol, Torpoint, Cornwall (Devonport).
- Edward Stanley Chidsey, Foreman Carpenter, Vickers-Armstrongs (Aircraft) Ltd. (Addlestone, Surrey).
- Gilbert Clark, Part-time Instructor, Civil Defence Corps, Cheshire.
- Charles William Clarke, Foundry Apprentice Instructor, Marshalls Sons & Co. Ltd., Gainsborough.
- William Cockburn, Grieve, Kingston Farm, North Berwick.
- Basil Llewellyn Maitland Coffin, Technical Class Grade III, Royal Naval Aircraft Yard, Gosport (Fareham).
- Dennis Albert Cole, Foreman, Swindon Works, Western Region, British Railways.
- Arthur William Colley, Foreman Painter, Saunders Roe Ltd. (Ningwood, Isle of Wight).
- John Connor, Surgeryman, Royal Ordnance Factory, Fazakerley, War Office (Liverpool).
- Harold Corble, Sergeant-Major Instructor, 1st Cadet Battalion, London Rifle Brigade, Royal Masonic School, Bushey (St Albans).
- Nellie Cotterill, Station Refreshment Room Manageress, British Transport Hotels and Catering Services, Crewe.
- Robert Cowan, Builder's Superintendent, Altnagelvin Hospital, Londonderry.
- Harold Cox, Sector Controller, Civil Defence Corps, East Riding (Yorkshire) Division (Hedon).
- Bessie Craven, Home Help, Oldham County Borough.
- Robert William Crawford, Assistant Chief Inspector, Armaments Division, Armstrong Whitworth Aircraft Ltd. (Coventry).
- Arthur William John Cripps, Chief Officer, Class I, HM Prison, Manchester.
- William Crone, Non-Technical II, Works Fire Brigade Officer, Windscale Works, United Kingdom Atomic Energy Authority (Sellafield, Cumberland).
- William Cullen, Ohargehand Fitter, Barton Power Station, Central Electricity Generating Board (Manchester).
- Jenkin Llewelyn Davies, Sergeant, Metropolitan Police (Harrow).
- Arthur James Disley, Foreman Moulder, Coburg Dockyard Foundry, Mersey Docks and Harbour Board (Liverpool).
- Percy Broadbent Dowling, Postman, Higher Grade, Head Post Office, Huddersfield.
- Harold Dowman, Rescue Party Leader, Civil Defence Corps, Kesteven (Lincolnshire). (North Hykeham).
- Cyril Downing, Leader, North Peterborough Boys' Club.
- Walter Cornelius Duncan, Office Keeper, Grade I, Board of Trade (Morden, Surrey).
- Helen Mary Dunn, Assistant Nurse, Manor Park Hospital, Bristol.
- Priestley Henry Dunn, Travelling Superintendent Gardener, North-West Africa Area, Commonwealth War Graves Commission.
- Alexander Eadie, Preparatory Worker, Lochhead Colliery, Scottish Division, National Coal Board (Wemyss).
- Edward John Easter, lately Technical Officer, Engineering Depot, General Post Office, King's Lynn.
- Jacob Hannah Edgar, MC, Foreman Enameller, Shanks & Co. Ltd., Barrhead, Renfrewshire.
- William Taylor Egglestone, Part-time Fatstock Officer, Ministry of Agriculture, Fisheries and Food (Penrith, Cumberland).
- Dora Mabel Evans, Travelling Supervisor, Telephone Manager's Office, General Post Office, Cardiff.
- Francis Sidney Evans, Driver, Neath Western Region, British Railways.
- John Leo Farnan, Supervisor Grade II, War Office, Germany.
- Joseph Richard Fawcett, Joiner and Cabinet Maker, Safety in Mines Research Establishment, Ministry of Power, Buxton.
- Thomas Victor Fazackerley, Range Warden, Crowden Rifle Range, Hadfield, Manchester.
- Alice Fielder, Centre Organiser, Holderness North and Hornsea, Women's Voluntary Service (Driffield, Yorkshire).
- Arthur George Ford, Foreman Carder and Spinner, Hunt & Winterbotham Ltd. (Dursley, Gloucestershire).
- Arthur Ernest Full, Collector, Social Organisation Savings Group, Aylesbury, Bucks.
- William Charles Game, Senior Assistant, Rothamsted Experimental Station, Harpenden, Hertfordshire.
- William Eric Thomas Glazbrook, Assistant Inspector, Head Post Office, Salisbury.
- Ralph Goodwin, Foreman, Newton Bros Ltd., Derby.
- Mary Agnes Conway-Gordon, Voluntary Training Officer, Civil Defence Corps, Wiltshire (Donhead St. Mary, Wiltshire).
- Charles Goulding, Leading Draughtsman, Armament Research and Development Establishment, War Office (Orpington, Kent).
- Horace Green, Station Officer, West Sussex Fire Brigade (Haslemere, Surrey).
- John Robert Griffiths, No. 1 Inspector, Aluminium Corporation Ltd., Dolgarrog (Llanrwst).
- George A. Grime, Honorary Civil Defence Officer, Paignton.
- Lawrence John Hall, Leading Hand, Royal Aircraft Establishment, Ministry of Aviation, Farnborough (Church Crookham, Hampshire).
- Mary Ann Hannah, Sub-Postmistress, Lamplugh Sub Post Office, Workington, Cumberland.
- Allan Harrison, Commandant, Preston Special Constabulary (Preston).
- Frank Harrison, Ambulance Attendant, Sleaford, Lincolnshire.
- Levi Heath, Check Weighman, Ramcroft Colliery, East Midlands Division, National Coal Board (Chesterfield).
- Thomas Archibald Hitch, Senior Inspector, Preston Depot, Ribble Motor Services Ltd.
- Mary Foran Holloway, Lay Sister, St. Joseph's School for Boys, Orpington, Kent.
- James Edward Howe, JP, Back Ripper, Newmarket Silkstone Colliery, North Eastern Division, National Coal Board (Stanley, Yorkshire).
- Adelina Martha Hull, Collector, Street Savings Groups, Hemel Hempstead.
- Charles Edwin Hutcheson, Chargehand Electrical Fitter, Ministry of Works (London, S.E.27).
- Louise Hutton, Collector, Fulneck Village Savings Group, Pudsey.
- Charles Laird Jack, Inspector, City of Glasgow Police.
- Hamish Fleming Jack, District Senior Commercial Officer (Agriculture), North of Scotland Hydro-Electric Board (Dingwall).
- Wilfrid Charles Jackson, Leading Illustrator, Inspectorate of Armaments, Ministry of Aviation, Woolwich (Bexleyheath, Kent).
- William Henry Jewitt, Chief Inspector, War Department Constabulary (Didcot, Berkshire).
- W. Johns. For services to the Mumbles Rangers Boys' Club (Swansea).
- William Henry Johnson, Foreman Turbine Driver, Walsall Power Station, Central Electricity Generating Board (West Bromwich).
- Norman Jones, Inspector, Head Post Office, Llandudno and Colwyn Bay.
- David Joslin, Senior Herdsman, Lord Rayleigh Farms Incorporated (Chelmsford).
- Sarfaraz Khan X Juma Khan, Engine Room Serang, SS Strathnavern, Peninsular & Oriental Steam Navigation Company.
- Raymond Eric Kimber, Chargehand, George Waller & Son, Ltd., Stroud (Chalford, Gloucester).
- Walter Strange Kirkbright, Foreman, Southall Sub-Area Construction Department, Southern Electricity Board (London, W.5).
- Gwilym Lewis, Health Physics Attendant, Royal Ordnance Factory, Cardiff, Ministry of Aviation.
- Robert John Lewis, lately Water Infusion Man, Garw Colliery, South Western Division, National Coal Board (Bridgend).
- William Lewis, lately Surface Worker, Yniscedwyn Colliery, South Western Division, National Coal Board (Swansea).
- Harry Lilley, Foreman, Distribution Department, Sheffield District, East Midlands Gas Board (Sheffield).
- Charles Lobb, Head Foreman, J. S. White & Company Ltd., Cowes, Isle of Wight.
- William Percy Lund, Hall Porter, Royal Artillery Mess, War Office, Woolwich.
- Edith Lunt, Commandant, Montgomeryshire/2 Detachment, British Red Cross Society (Llanfyllin).
- Monica Freeth Lunt, Deputy County Organiser, County of London, Women's Voluntary Service (London, W.1).
- Frederick Charles Lynham, Senior Marine Survey Assistant, Ministry of Transport, Cardiff.
- Alexander McBride, Engineroom Storekeeper, SS Esso Durham, Esso Petroleum Company Ltd. (Bursledon, Hampshire).
- Donald McDonald, Grieve, Beechwood Farm, Department of Agriculture and Fisheries for Scotland (Inverness).
- Susan McFall, Collector, Street Savings Group, Carrickfergus, County Antrim.
- William McKay, Volunteer-in-Charge, Coast-life Saving Corps, Ayr.
- Ritchie McLean, Foreman, I. & J. Dunfoar, Herring Curers, Fraserburgh.
- Adele McRobb, Member, Aberdeen Centre, Women's Voluntary Service.
- Charles Maddison, Technical Officer, Telephone Manager's Office, General Post Office, Newcastle upon Tyne.
- George Marsh, Senior Overlooker, Royal Ordance Factory, Chorley, War Office (Bolton).
- Dorothy Margaret Marshall, Chief Supervisor (Telephones), Telephone Exchange, General Post Office, Bradford.
- Alfred Matthews, Research and Development Craftsman, Special, Royal Aircraft Establishment, Ministry of Aviation (Frimley, Surrey).
- Albert Edgar May, Development Inspector, Bristol Siddeley Engines Ltd., Coventry.
- Frederick George Mayhew, Head Servant, RAF College, Cranwell (Lincoln).
- Richard James Middleton, Carpenter, Technical Group, War Office (Arborfield, Berkshire).
- William Thomas Edward Middleton, Chief Office Keeper, Air Ministry (London, S.W.3).
- Thomas Charles Henry Miles, Fitter, Elliott Bros (London) Ltd. (London, S.E.22).
- James Millar, Head Constable, Royal Ulster Constabulary (Belfast).
- Alfred Miller, Leading Stoker, Grimsby Power Station, Central Electricity Generating Board (Grimsby).
- Aaron Mills, Meter Chargehand, Mid-Sussex Sub-Area, South Eastern Electricity Board (Brighton).
- Alexander Stewart Burke-Murphy, Sub-District Commandant, Ulster Special Constabulary (Bangor).
- Charles Edwin Newman, Foreman (Mains and Services) North Western Division, North Thames Gas Board (Wembley).
- William Nicol, Chief Officer, Class II, HM Prison, Edinburgh.
- Horace Vernon Overington, Dean's Verger, St. Paul's Cathedral (London, E.C.4).
- George Oswald Pagan, Inspector, Metropolitan Police (London, W.5).
- George Henry Page, lately Chief Officer, Class II, HM Borstal, Usk (Faversham, Kent).
- Henry Thomas Crane Pashley, W/T Operator (qualified), HM Dockyard, Portsmouth.
- Joseph Henry Pead, Principal Doorkeeper, House of Commons (London, S.W.20).
- Edwin George John Pendergast, Non-Technical Class, Grade I, Royal Ordnance Factory,.
- Burghfield, Ministry of Aviation (Reading).
- Leonard Frederick Perkins, Officer Keeper I, Ministry of Education (London, S.W.17).
- Archibald Petticrew, Head Foreman Fitter, Harland & Wolff, Ltd., Belfast.
- Joseph Richard Powell, Leader, Wombwell Service of Youth Club, Yorkshire.
- Stanley Robert Pugsley, Technician, Foreign Office (London, W.3).
- Doris Mabel Raymond, Chief Supervisor, Telephone Exchange, Carlisle, General Post Office.
- James Readdie, Deputy, No. 1 Shale Mine, Philpstoun, Scottish Oils Ltd. (Linlithgow).
- John Richardson, Shipwright, Barclay Curie & Co. Ltd., Glasgow.
- George Rimmer, Chief Observer, Post 2/R3, No. 2 Group, Royal Observer Corps (Woking, Surrey).
- David Roberts, Boatswain, MV Diomed, Alfred Holt & Company (Bangor).
- Gladys Roberts, Telephone Operator, Admiralty Central Offices, Manchester.
- Dorothy Robinson, Centre Organiser, Richmond North Riding (Yorkshire), Women's Voluntary Service.
- Charles Rodgers, Deputy, Grade I, Prestongrange Colliery, Scottish Division, National Coal Board (Prestonpans).
- Ernest Shepherd, Research and Experimental Mechanic, Chargehand I, Aldermaston, United Kingdom Atomic Energy Authority (Basingstoke).
- Alice Mary Sheppard, Blind Telephone Operator, Hull Employment Exchange, Ministry of Labour (Sutton-on-Hull).
- Wilfred Gardiner Sissons, Ganger, Hull and East Yorkshire River Board (Leven).
- Gilbert Keith Smith, Boatswain, MV Royal Sovereign, General Steam Navigation Co. Ltd. (Edinburgh).
- John Taylor Smith, Foreman, Ductile Steels Ltd., Willinhall (Darlaston, Staffordshire).
- Zena Mary Snell, Chief Observer, No. 9 Group, Royal Observer Corps (Axminster, Devon).
- Leslie Richard Sparks, Technical Officer, Post Office Research Station, Dollis Hill (London, W.4).
- Pihilip Hugh Spivey, Station Warden, Headquarters, Coastal Command, Air Ministry (Northwood, Middlesex).
- Albert Edward Squibb, Yard Superintendent, Command Ordnance Depot, Bicester, War Office.
- George Stephenson, Sub-Officer, Hull Fire Brigade (Kingston-upon-Hull).
- John Stevens, Surveyor, Grade IV, Ministry of Agriculture, Fisheries and Food (Bembridge, Isle of Wight).
- Leonard Stevens, Motor Driver, Supplies Department, General Post Office (London, N.W.1).
- William Reynold Steward, Part-time Instructor, Civil Defence Corps, Glamorgan.
- William Dunn Stokoe, Chief Inspector, Lancashire Constabulary (Lancaster).
- Albert Alfred Street, Sub-Officer, Hampshire Fire Brigade (Ringwood).
- Jessie Sturrock, Area Organiser, Newport, Wormit and Tayport, Women's Voluntary Service (Fife).
- Florence Tarrant, Head Tracer, Royal Radar Establishment, Ministry of Aviation (Malvern).
- Charlotte Rebecca Taylor, Deputy Organiser, Birmingham County Borough, Women's Voluntary Service (Sutton Coldfield).
- Stanley Alfred James Thwaites, Supervisor (M), Telephone Manager's Office, South-West Area, General Post Office (London, S.W.11).
- John Stuart Clay Tilley, lately Sub-Postmaster, Carlton, Nottingham.
- Edith Mary Tipper, Collector, Gordon Avenue Savings Group, Bognor Regis.
- Terence Eric Tomkins, Senior Assistant (Scientific), Admiralty Experimental Diving Unit, Portsmouth (Southsea).
- George North Tuck, Sub-Postmaster, Stowlangtoft Post Office, Bury St. Edmunds.
- Frank Underbill, Collector, Higher Drive, National Savings Street Group, Purley, Surrey.
- Alfred Thomas Underwood, Instructor, Grade III Fitter, Army Apprentices School, War Office, Ohepstow.
- Ethel Ivy Marion Wide, lately Ward Sister, Sandhill Park Hospital, Bishops Lydeard, Taunton.
- John Hector Wilkie, Station Officer, Angus Area Fire Brigade (Dundee).
- Dorothy Jane Wilkinson, Chief Forewoman and Quality Inspector, Cerebos, Ltd. (West Hartlepool).
- Annie Joan Willis, Part-time Instructor, Civil Defence Corps, Dorset (Wimborne).
- Harry Wilson, Technical Class, Grade III, Royal Ordnance Factory, Blackburn, War Office (Brierfield, Lancashire).
- Thomas Wilson, lately Council Officer, Glasgow Corporation.
- Sam Winfield, Telephonist, East Midlands Division, National Coal Board (Chesterfield).
- Albert Wooldridge, Technician IIA Jointer, Victoria Telephone Exchange, General Post Office (Tadworth, Surrey).
- Herbert John Wootton, MM, Principal Doorkeeper, House of Lords (Slough).
- William Frederick Young, Radio Technician, Royal Air Force, North Weald (Epping, Essex).

State of New South Wales

- Reginald Cullen, Senior Instrument Maker, Sydney Teachers College, Department of Education, New South Wales.
- William Cecil Frederick Hoare, Custodian of Plans, Department of Lands, New South Wales.
- Gordon Heugh Johnston, Land Inspector, Department of Lands, New South Wales.
- Joseph William Jones, Chief Messenger, Chief Secretary's Department, New South Wales.
- James Patrick McNally, Chief Forest Assessor, Forestry Commission, New South Wales.
- James Pearce, lately Farm Foreman, Hawkesbury Agricultural College, Department of Agriculture, New South Wales.
- Peter Hastie Thomson, Manager, State Brickworks, New South Wales.

For services to research into the subject of artificial respiration.

- Ina Lillian Arthur.
- Kenneth Charles Breyley.
- Lancelot Barry Dawson.
- Dulcie Muriel English.
- Alfred Brian Hayer.
- Thomas Ewington Howard.
- Owen Paul Leonard.
- Allan Geoffrey Simpson.
- Laurence Samuel Slattery.
- Laurence Frederick Smith.
- Arthur Stephens.
- Leslie Martin Wasley.

State of Queensland

- Walter Frank Hoger, Chief Prison Officer, HM Prison, Brisbane.

Southern Rhodesia

- Harold Cuthbert Hampton, Chief Messenger, Legislative Assembly, Salisbury, Southern Rhodesia.

Swaziland

- Thomas John Bell, Road Overseer, Public Works Department, Swaziland.

Commonwealth Relations

- John Albert Stevens, Head Hall Porter, Royal Overseas League.

Overseas Territories

- Abdoo Muhammad Ali, Akil of Meat Sellers, Aden Municipality.
- Rupert Nathaniel Lythcott, Head Lighthouse Keeper, Barbados.
- Florence Brown, Nurse, Leper Home, Dominica.
- Katar Chand Rajp, Permanent Way Inspector, Grade II, East Africa High Commission.
- Babou Nian, Senior Master, HMCS Lady Wright, Marine Department, Gambia.
- Im Ping-kwong, Overseer, Permanent Way Department, Hong Kong Tramways, Hong Kong.
- David Adams Thuku, Clerk, Grade I, Baragoi Division of Samburu, Kenya.
- Leonard Waithaka Waruingi, Clerk, Grade I, Wamba Division of Samburu, Kenya.
- Joseph Spiteri, Manager, Vernon United Services Club, Malta.
- Joseph Mushota Malubeni, President of the Lusaka Urban Native Court, Northern Rhodesia.
- Jonas Bernard Mubanga, Fish Scout, Northern Rhodesia.
- Charles Kenneth Clingham, Foreman Mechanic, St. Helena.
- Pamphile Hubert Charles, Steward, Mental Hospital, Saint Lucia.
- Kia Hem Heng, Travelling Dispensary Superintendent, Sarawak.
- Samuel Moiwulo Jusu, Senior Dresser, Nixon Memorial Hospital, Segbwema, Sierra Leone.
- Mohamed Chingwalu Likulu, Liwali of Ruponda, Tanganyika.
- Yohana Mkande, Senior Laboratory Assistant, Tanga Laboratory, Tanganyika.
- Augustino Okello, Detective Head Constable, Uganda.
- Tekaiwa Malua, Assistant Postmaster, Tarawa, Gilbert and Ellice Islands Colony, Western Pacific.

=== Royal Victorian Medal (RVM) ===
In Gold

- James Endacott.

In Silver

- Joseph Annison.
- James Robert Baines.
- Chief Radio Supervisor Arthur Frank Barnden, P/JX 148132.
- Robert Peter Crisp.
- Yeoman Bed Goer Harry Davis, MBE, Her Majesty's Bodyguard of The Yeomen of the Guard.
- Francis William Dawkins.
- 520964 Flight Sergeant Pierre Denaeyer, Royal Air Force.
- George Edward Fitzgerald.
- Maurice Dan Goodman.
- 574954 Chief Technician David Kenneth Hicks, Royal Air Force.
- Elsie Edith May Mann.
- Richard William Shefford.
- 1924349 Corporal David John Thomas, Royal Air Force.

=== Royal Red Cross (RRC) ===
- Edith Joan McKay, ARRC, Principal Matron, Queen Alexandra's Royal Naval Nursing Service.
- Major Dorothy Freda Duckworth (206128), Queen Alexandra's Royal Army Nursing Corps.
- Major Madeline Ruth Fougere (213292), Queen Alexandra's Royal Army Nursing Corps.
- Wing Officer Gwenllian Jones, ARRC, (405094), Princess Mary's Royal Air Force Nursing Service.

==== Associate of the Royal Red Cross (ARRC) ====
- Lily Brooks, Head Naval Nursing Auxiliary.
- Major Margaret Gwynne Lawrence (342313), Queen Alexandra's Royal Army Nursing Corps.
- Major Daphne Joy Drury-Mettham (378938), Queen Alexandra's Royal Army Nursing Corps.
- Squadron Officer Christina Whyte (405595), Princess Mary's Royal Air Force Nursing Service.

=== Air Force Cross (AFC) ===
Royal Air Force

- Wing Commander Reginald Walter Jordan, DFC, (151491).
- Wing Commander Charles Gilbert Maughan (500631).
- Squadron Leader John Martin Crowley (3039748).
- Squadron Leader John Hamilton Garstin (200041).
- Squadron Leader Albert Daniel Arthur Honley (57544).
- Squadron Leader John Alonzo McArthur (607151).
- Squadron Leader James Primrose (502116).
- Squadron Leader Robert Theophilus Robinson (3046013).
- Squadron Leader Harold Smith, DFC, (172359).
- Squadron Leader Peter Alan Thomson (191928).
- Flight Lieutenant John Goodwin Cruse (3039140).
- Flight Lieutenant Richard Griffin (134121).
- Flight Lieutenant Raynham George Hanna (4037254).
- Flight Lieutenant Alan David Harvie (3507715).
- Flight Lieutenant Gordon Norman Lewis (4047743).
- Flight Lieutenant Maxwell Nicholas Sparks (59631).

==== Bar to Air Force Cross ====
- Squadron Leader Henry Alan Merriman, AFC, (3108403).

=== Air Force Medal (AFM) ===
Royal Air Force

- 1523515 Flight Sergeant (now Master Engineer) Martin Brennan, DFM.
- 2557255 Flight Sergeant Denis James Greenwood.

=== Queen's Police Medal (QPM) ===
England and Wales

- Stanley Grey, Chief Constable, South Shields Borough Police.
- Edward William Cowpe Pendleton, OBE, BEM, Chief Constable, Coventry City Police.
- Harold Shelley Phillibrown, Assistant Chief Constable, Essex County Constabulary.
- Alec Macdonald Woolgar, lately Chief Superintendent, Kent County Constabulary.
- Harvey Palmer, Chief Superintendent, Birmingham City Police.
- Geoffrey Ineson Burgess, Chief Superintendent, Metropolitan Police.
- Stanley Wilkinson, Superintendent and Deputy Chief Constable, Worcester City Police.
- James Hall, Superintendent, Cumberland and Westmorland Constabulary.
- Alfred Bennifer, Superintendent, North Riding County Constabulary.
- Leonard Stretton, Superintendent, Derbyshire Constabulary.
- Thomas George Wall, Superintendent, Metropolitan Police.
- Edmund Seymour George King, Superintendent, Metropolitan Police.

Scotland

- James Anderson Robertson, OBE, Chief Constable, Glasgow City Police.
- George McMaster, Superintendent, Fife Constabulary.

Northern Ireland

- Austin Ivan Hunter, Head Constable, Royal Ulster Constabulary.

State of Victoria

- Herbert Edward Byrne, Superintendent, Victoria Police Force.
- Edwin William Rosewarne, Superintendent, Victoria Police Force.
- Andrew Stein Tannahill, Chief Inspector, Victoria Police Force.

State of South Australia

- Noel Roy Lenton, Inspector 1st Class, South Australia Police Force.

Southern Rhodesia

- George McLean Harvey, Senior Assistant Commissioner, British South Africa Police.

Overseas Territories

- Raymond Henry Thomas Beaumont, Commissioner of Police, Fiji.
- William Segrue, Assistant Commissioner of Police, Hong Kong.
- Alfred Gordon Langdon, Assistant Commissioner of Police, Jamaica.
- Ivor Vernon Barfoot Mills, Assistant Commissioner of Police, Kenya.
- Victor Thomas Smithyman, Assistant Commissioner of Police, Nyasaland.
- Michael John McKinlay, Assistant Commissioner of Police, Tanganyika.

=== Queen's Fire Services Medal (QFSM) ===
England and Wales

- Harold Bretherick, Assistant Chief Officer, Staffordshire Fire Brigade.
- Stanley Frank Willey, MBE, Chief Officer, Exeter Fire Brigade.
- John McIntyre, MBE, Chief Officer, Cumberland Fire Brigade.
- William Hindley, Divisional Officer, Lancashire Fire Brigade.
- Frank Lionel George Hopkins, Divisional Officer, Essex Fire Brigade.

Overseas Territories

- Richard Roger William Pattrick, Chief Fire Officer, Mombasa.

=== Colonial Police Medal (CPM) ===
Southern Rhodesia

- Sidney Frederick Samuel Bristow, Superintendent, British South Africa Police.
- Chakawora, Stallion Sergeant, British South Africa Police.
- Reginald Albert French Coulton, Staff Chief Inspector, British South Africa Police.
- Andrew Harold Kirkwood, Chief Inspector, British South Africa Police.
- Lawrence, First Sergeant, British South Africa Police.
- Arthur Kingsley Lennard, Superintendent, British South Africa Police.
- Ngorima, Detective First Sergeant, British South Africa Police.
- Ronald Frederick Trangmar, Depot Chief Inspector, British South Africa Police.
- John Layton Wordsworth, Superintendent, British South Africa Police.

Overseas Territories

- Mohiamud Hassan Abdullahi, Inspector, Kenya Police Force.
- Aritoine Adam, Sub-Inspector (Acting Inspector), Seychelles Police Force.
- Harold Baker, Assistant Superintendent, Kenya Police Force.
- John Bell, Senior Superintendent, Kenya Police Force.
- John Doudney Blake, MBE, TD, Senior Superintendent, Tanganyika Police Force.
- Lufca Dalizu, Chief Inspector, Kenya Police Force.
- Jonas Egerton Demas, Superintendent, Trinidad Police Force.
- Henry Augustus Elcock, Inspector, British Guiana Police Force.
- Douglas Dobson Fairfoul, Assistant Commissioner, North Borneo Police Force.
- Jabez James Ferguson, Assistant Superintendent, Trinidad Police Force.
- James Henry Goodman, Chief Inspector, Hong Kong Police Force.
- Andrew Stanislaus Greiff, Superintendent, Tanganyika Police Force.
- Douglas Adrian Griffin, Senior Superintendent, Uganda Police Force.
- Mohamed Hassan s/o Abdul Rehman Chaudhry, Assistant Superintendent, Uganda Police Force.
- John Lecious Hutchinson, Detective Sergeant, Jamaica Police Force.
- Pengiran Jaya bin Pengiran Rajid, Assistant Superintendent, Brunei Police Force.
- Thomas Kavanagh, Superintendent, Hong Kong Police Force.
- Selemani Kimenya, Detective Sergeant, Tanganyika Police Force.
- Chepwoin Kiplangat, Sergeant, Kenya Police Force.
- Leone Lesianawai, Sergeant-Major, Fiji Police Force.
- Francis Julius Masetti, Superintendent, Gibraltar Police Force.
- Edwin Arnold Murray, Inspector, St. Lucia Fire Brigade.
- William Byekwaso Musoke, Assistant Superintendent, Uganda Police Force.
- Yoweri Musoke s/o Erenesti Kazinda, Detective Head Constable, Uganda Police Force.
- Paulo Mjwalubaba, Detective Sergeant, Tanganyika Police Force.
- George Douglas Patterson, Superintendent, Northern Rhodesia Police Force.
- Stephen Polo, Detective Sergeant, Tanganyika Police Force.
- Ronald Hugh Montresor Read, Superintendent, Kenya Police Force.
- John Joseph Uriah Reynolds, Inspector, St. Kitts Nevis Anguilla Police Force.
- Augustus Roberts, Deputy Commissioner, Bahamas Police Force.
- Basil Linton Robinson, Superintendent, Jamaica Police Force.
- Norman Garner Rolph, Acting Assistant Commissioner, Hong Kong Police Force.
- Ange Savy, Sub-Inspector, Seychelles Police Force.
- Christopher Sesanda s/o John Musisi, Senior Driver, Uganda Police Force.
- John Singo, Sub-Inspector, Nyasaland Police Force.
- Alexander Telfer Ternent, Superintendent, Uganda Police Force.
- Wong Choy, Staff Sergeant, Hong Kong Police Force.
- Arthur John Yates, Superintendent (Acting Senior Superintendent), Nyasaland Police Force.
- Ramon Young Tsun-sheung, Assistant Superintendent, Hong Kong Auxiliary Police Force.

=== Imperial Service Medal ===
Admiralty

- Adams, Thomas Gilbert, Machinist, Portsmouth.
- Adamson, John Hutchison, Electrical Fitter, Rosyth.
- Allen, Frederick Norman, Driller, Portsmouth.
- Armstrong, William Bain, Shipwright, Devonport.
- Attard, Saviour Charles Sebastian, Local Draughtsman, Malta.
- Beauchamp, William Thomas, Boilermaker, Portsmouth.
- Bond, Frank William, Technical Class, Grade II, Birmingham.
- Boulter, George Philip, Electrical Fitter, Portsmouth.
- Bowen, Reginald William, Technical Class, Grade II.
- Brown, Richard Henry Hernaman, Skilled Labourer, Devonport.
- Carty, Henry, Motor Transport Driver, Crombie.
- Ching, Samuel Alfred, Boilermaker, Devonport.
- Churchman, Stanley William, Chargeman of Skilled Labourers, Deptford.
- Cooke, Ernest Frederick, Foreman of Works Writer, Portsmouth.
- Dale, Leslie William, Storewright, Chatham.
- Darke, Albert Edward, Able Seaman, Devonport.
- Davis, Frederick Thomas, Wireman, Chatham.
- Dawson, Samuel Lark, Chargeman of Electrical Fitters, Bandeath.
- Denney, Thomas George William, Shipwright/Driller, Portsmouth.
- Fogg, George William Edward, Sailmaker, Chatham.
- Foster, Malcolm Gallais, BEM, Technical Class, Grade II, Minworth.
- Hardy, Alfred, Mechanic Examiner, Woolwich.
- Heath, John Thomas, Joiner, Bull Point.
- Holder, Albert Victor, Foreman of Manufacture, Non-mechanical Grade III, Caerwent.
- Holmes, Fred, Skilled Labourer, Priddy's Hard.
- Hopkins, David Stanley, Photoprinter, Grade I, Portsmouth.
- Hume, William Thomas, Electrical Fitter, Devonport.
- Humphris, Henry James, Chargeman of Fitters, Priddy's Hard.
- Jackman, Richard Bowden, Boilermaker, Devonport.
- Jackson, Wilfred Edward, Engine Fitter, Local Chargeman, Devonport.
- Jeffery, Arthur James, Shipwright, Local Chargeman, Portsmouth.
- Jones, Frederick George, Engine Fitter, Permanent Chargeman, Portsmouth.
- Kerridge, Sydney, Messenger, Portsmouth.
- King, Clarence Sandy, Chargeman of Motor Transport Drivers, Rosyth.
- Lock, William Edward Thomas, Coppersmith, Devonport.
- Paley, Wilfred, Technical Class, Grade II, Caerwent.
- Pearce, Owen Gordon, Shipwright, Portsmouth.
- Pedrick, William Frederick, Permanent Chargeman of Riggers, Devonport.
- Peliza, Domingo, Skilled Labourer, Gibraltar.
- Picton, Frank Edgar, Technical Class, Grade II, Priddy's Head.
- Rees, Norman John, Shipwright, Portsmouth.
- Rolls, Cecil Walter, Skilled Labourer, Holton Heath.
- Ross, Ernest, Senior Pilot, Port Auxiliary Service, Rosyth.
- Sayer, Sidney, Ship Fitter, Chatham.
- Sanders, William Charles, Labourer, Devonport.
- Scawn, William George, Skilled Labourer, Devonport.
- Shields, James, Able Seaman, Rosyth.
- Shrubsole, Horace Joseph, Leading Slinger, Permanent Chargeman, Chatham.
- Smith, William Edward, Smith, Permanent Chargeman, Chatham.
- Sparshott, Robert William Lloyd, Skilled Labourer, Priddy's Hard.
- Turner, James Albert, Permanent Chargeman of Engine Fitters, Devonport.
- Wallis, George William, Turner, Alexandria.
- Ward, Victor Stevens Lockhart, Inspector of Riggers, Portsmouth.
- Wilson, Duncan Campbell, Permanent Chargeman of Fitters, Crombie.
- Woods, John Thomas, Technical Class, Grade II, Portsmouth.
- Woolgar, Richard Joseph, Technical Class, Grade III, Portsmouth.
- Wyatt, Alfred Thomas, Technical Class, Grade II, Birmingham.

Ministry of Agriculture, Fisheries and Food

- Pask, John, Seed Collector, Royal Botanic Gardens, Kew.

Air Ministry

- Apps, Frank Louis, Instructional Officer, Grade IV.
- Catherall, George Herbert, Leading Storeman.
- Craddock, Douglas Lionel Collin, Instructional Officer, Grade III.
- Evans, David Gwilym, Instructional Officer, Grade III.
- Freeman, Vere Lawrence Charles, Head Batman.
- Grady, John Thomas, Senior Messenger.
- Hiscock, Thomas, BEM, Mess Steward, Grade II.
- Holloway, Arthur Ernest, Driver, Mechanical Transport.
- Purdie, Charles Victor, Semi-skilled Labourer.

Ministry of Aviation

- Blount, Frederick James, Technical Grade II.
- Foulstone, Sydney, Technical Grade III.
- Nightingale, William Alfred Frederick Reginald, Research and Development Craftsman (Special).
- Porcher, William Lewis, Senior Messenger.
- Taylor, John, Kitchen Hand.

Board of Customs and Excise

- Cox, Francis Blakeman, Watcher.
- Pack, Lionel Holdway, Watcher.

Ministry of Labour

- Sandel, Frederick, Cleaner.

Ordnance Survey Department

- Pauling, Thomas Edwin, Draughtsman, Higher Grade.

General Post Office

- Ablett, James Arthur, Postman, London Postal Region.
- Almond, Arthur Frederick, Postman, Higher Grade, London Postal Region.
- Baker, Albert Edward, Postman, Higher Grade, London Postal Region.
- Batchelor, William Henry, Postman, London Postal Region.
- Bennett, Thomas Victor, Postman, Higher Grade, London Postal Region.
- Bullard, Bertie Osmond, BEM, Workshop Supervisor, Grade II, Gloucester.
- Bunt, William John, Postman, St. Austell.
- Burke, John, Postman, Bolton.
- Butcher, Claude Edgar, Postal and Telegraph Officer, Bletchley.
- Carter, Benjamin, Postman, Higher Grade, London Postal Region.
- Carter, Charles Herbert, Postman, London Postal Region.
- Collier, Joseph, Postman, Higher Grade, London Postal Region.
- Collins, Bessie Winifred, Telegraphist, London Telecommunications Region.
- Collins, Charles, Postman, Leven.
- Collins, James, Postman, Kilmarnock.
- Cox, Ernest William, Postman, Worcester.
- Crowley, Dorothy Ella, Postal and Telegraph Officer, London Postal Region.
- Curtis, Leslie Frank, Postman, Higher Grade, Lydney.
- Dalby, Harold, Postman, Birmingham.
- Dawson, James Charles Percival, Sorter, London Postal Region.
- Dewhirst, Herbert, Labourer, Aberdeen.
- Dickens, Thomas, Technical Officer, Cardiff.
- Dixon, George Victor, Postman, London Postal Region.
- Dowd, Edward George, Postman, Higher Grade, Portadown.
- Downes, Claude, Postman, Ipswich.
- Driver, Stanley Harold, Inspector, London Telecommunications Region.
- Elsworthy, Walter William, Assistant Inspector, Tiverton.
- Ephgrave, Muriel Alice, Assistant Supervisor, Barnet.
- Fryer, Henry Charles, Postman, Luton.
- Gillard, Edward Albert Lister, Technician, Class I, Southampton.
- Gladstone, Dorothy Gertrude, Supervisor, Middlesbrough.
- Gray, James, Assistant Supervisor, Coatbridge and Airdrie.
- Guy, Alfred James, Postman, Liverpool.
- Hainsworth, Joshua Edmund, Postman, Higher Grade, London Postal Region.
- Hargreaves, Thomas, Inspector, Preston.
- Harris, Frank Sidney, Postman, London Postal Region.
- Heath, James Richard, Postman, London Postal Region.
- Hirst, Rowland Thomas, Technical Officer, Birmingham.
- Hobart, Herbert Edward, Postman, London Postal Region.
- Holden, Frederick John, Technical Officer, Guildford.
- Illman, Kenneth Harry, Inspector, Tunbridge Wells Telephone Area.
- James, Redvers Arthur, Technician, Class I, London Postal Region.
- Jarvis, Sydney Edward, Postman, Canterbury.
- Johnson, Arthur Alfred, Assistant Storekeeper, Supplies Department, London.
- Johnston, Andrew McDowall, Postman, Paisley.
- Jones, James Alfred, Postal and Telegraph Officer, London Postal Region.
- Jones, Samuel Eyton, Technician, Class I, Chester.
- Kay, Hubert, Postman, Barnsley.
- King, William, Postman, Stroud.
- Knight, Reginald Arthur William, Postman, Higher Grade, Bath.
- Lamont, William Crawford, Postman, Higher Grade, Oban.
- Lang, Joseph, Foreman, London Postal Region.
- Larby, Eric, Postman, Farnham.
- Lee, Walter Aloysius, Postman, London Postal Region.
- Liebermann, Wilfred Leonard, Technical Officer, Oxford.
- Macdonald, Archibald, Postman, Portree.
- Mash, George Ernest, Sorter, London Postal Region.
- Miller, William McLean, Technical Officer, Glasgow.
- Milliams, William Ernest, Postman, Higher Grade, Dartford.
- Moody, Thomas Henry John, Postman, London Postal Region.
- Moore, Ruby Evelyn, Supervisor, London Telecommunications Region.
- Munro, Joseph, Head Postman, Aberdeen.
- Neath, Basil Leonard, Technician, Class I, London Telecommunications Region.
- Nicholls, Harold, Postman, Higher Grade, London Postal Region.
- Parker, Robert, Postman, Kilmarnock.
- Pearson, George, Technician, Class II (A), Liverpool.
- Prew, Francis John, Postman, Bury St. Edmunds.
- Purple, Arthur, Postman, Higher Grade, Leicester.
- Rich, Harry, Postman, Ely.
- Rigg, Walter Telford, Assistant Inspector, Penrith.
- Robertson, James William Alexander, Technician, Class I, London Telecommunications Region.
- Round, Evelyn Lindsey, Supervisor, London Telecommunications Region.
- Sampson, William Harry, Postman, Exmouth.
- Saw, Edward Harold, Assistant Inspector, Slough.
- Shannan, Edward Archibald Walker, Technician, Class I, Guildford.
- Simmonds, Cyril, Postal and Telegraph Officer, Ramsgate.
- Simpson, John Alexander, Inspector, Newcastle upon Tyne Telephone Area.
- Smith, Ralph Henry, Postman, Higher Grade, London Postal Region.
- Sparrow, James, Postman, Higher Grade, London Postal Region.
- Staples, Henri George, Postman, Stoke-on-Trent.
- Stenlake, Arthur Earnest, Postman, Uxbridge.
- Streatfield, Reginald Charles, Overseer, London Postal Region.
- Struthers, George McNaught, Postman, Bathgate.
- Stuart, Ronald John, DSM, Postman, London Postal Region.
- Sullivan, Bartholomew, Technician, Class II (A), London Telecommunications Region.
- Tapley, Hilda, Postal and Telegraph Officer, Birmingham.
- Taylor, Barry Belmont, Inspector, Engineering Department, London.
- Thompson, Thomas John, Packer and Porter, Supplies Department, London.
- Tillyer, William Edward, Postman, London Postal Region.
- Travers, Thomas, Postman, Higher Grade, Glasgow.
- Turner, Sydney, Postman, Widnes and Runcorn.
- Usmar, William Ewart, Assistant Superintendent, Tunbridge Wells.
- Vickery, Victor Arthur Roy, Assistant Inspector, Taunton.
- Welton, Francis Ernest, Postman, Higher Grade, Beccles.
- Williams, John Vaughan, Postman, Shrewsbury.
- Williamson, Alexander, Postman, Glasgow.
- Wilson, Ellen Hill, Postal and Telegraph Officer, Dunoon.
- Wing, John, Postman, Sleaford.
- Woolnough, Redvers Frederick, Postman, London Postal Region.
- Wren, William, Postal and Telegraph Officer, London Postal Region.
- Youngs, Henry George, Assistant Inspector, London Postal Region.

Prison Commission

- Conn, Samuel, Hospital Principal Officer, Leeds.
- Rabley, William Alfred Henry, Engineer, Class II, Portland.
- Severn, John, Principal Officer, Bristol.
- Tee, Frank Nathaniel, Hospital Chief Officer, Class I, Parkhurst.
- Whitaker, Albert, Principal Officer, Thorp Arch.
- Wilson, Henry Cyril, Prison Officer, Maidstone.

HM Stationery Office

- Brennan, James, Warehouseman, Grade II, Manchester.
- Cabling, Alfred Henry, Printing Machine Assistant.
- Lancaster, Arthur, Warehouseman, Grade II, Manchester.
- Westbrook, Albert Edward, Compositor.

Ministry of Transport

- Bryant, Thomas Oswald, Draughtsman.

War Office

- Ashdown, Francis Henry, Non Technical Works Class, Grade III.
- Barker, Albert Arthur Victor, Non Technical, Class II.
- Browne, George William, Carpenter.
- Coplin, George Richard, Slinger, Grade "A".
- Corderoy, William, Assistant Yard Foreman.
- Cutler, William John, Labourer I, Leading Hand.
- Davey, Robert, Labourer (Roads).
- Finch, Henry Ernest, Clothing Repairer.
- Furneaux, William, Painter.
- Goddard, Arthur Henry, Head Gardener.
- Heath, Bertie, Examiner 3rd Class.
- Henbest, Rowland Cecil, Stoker.
- Hoye, Ernest, Overlooker.
- Lawley, Albert Francis Edwin, Permanent Way Man, Leading Hand.
- Mann, John, Draughtsman.
- Middleton Alexander Edwin, Stores Class, Grade III.
- Perkins, Albert Thomas, Labourer II.
- Price, Robert Samuel, Technical Class, Grade II.
- Rainer, Albert William, Electrical Fitter.
- Reed, Robert George, Technical Class, Grade II.
- Smith, Thomas William Garbutt, Technical Class, Grade II.
- Taylor, Harry George Langley, Technical Class, Grade III.
- Tilley, Oliver James, Hammer Driver.
- Todd, James Watson, Examiner (Stores and Clothing).
- Watson, John Edward, Chargehand Electrician.

Ministry of Works

- Charlton, Arthur Henry, Watchman.
- Knight, Philip Andrew, Carpenter.
- Sims, Frank Daniel, Gardener I.
- Smith, James, Labourer.
- Thomas, Arthur, Labourer.
- Trouse, George William Charles, Leading Plumber.

=== Queen's Commendation for Valuable Service in the Air ===
United Kingdom

- Peter Richard Lear, Experimental Officer, Royal Aircraft Establishment, Farnborough.
- Stanley John Nicolle, Senior Training Captain, Pionair Aircraft, British European Airways Corporation.
- Thomas William Brooke-Smith, Chief Test Pilot, Short Bros. & Harland Ltd., Belfast.

Overseas Territories

- John Peter Cunningham, Senior Captain and Flight Captain, East African Airways, East Africa High Commission.
- June Margaret Wright, Commercial Pilot, Wilson Air Service Ltd., Nairobi, Kenya.

Royal Air Force

- Wing Commander Derek Le Roy Bird (52945).
- Wing Commander Robert Alexander Nathaniel McCready, OBE, (126157).
- Squadron Leader James Anthony Henry Armstrong, MBE, (51103).
- Squadron Leader David Mudie Fleming, DFC, (115780).
- Squadron Leader Dennis Edward King, DFC, (183198).
- Squadron Leader Robert Neil (58318).
- Squadron Leader John Stanley Owen, AFC, (55296).
- Squadron Leader Edward Sanderson Rodney (148388).
- Flight Lieutenant Allan Norman Ansell (1881118).
- Flight Lieutenant James Birnie (3024832).
- Flight Lieutenant John Mabbutt Bott (186107).
- Flight Lieutenant Douglas Stuart Bridson (3123583).
- Flight Lieutenant Ronald Charles Chapman, DFC, (144019).
- Flight Lieutenant Norman Clayton (56320).
- Flight Lieutenant George Cristinacce (4075627).
- Flight Lieutenant Robert Basil Morgan, DFC, (3129822).
- Flight Lieutenant Frederick Charles Bernard Penny, AFM, (574458).
- Flight Lieutenant Roy Rimington (3129842).
- Flight Lieutenant Harry Rumble, DFC, (174239).
- Flight Lieutenant Bernard Albert Sedgley (578553).
- Flight Lieutenant Thomas Simpson Syme, DFC, (2447524).
- Flight Lieutenant Peter Thompson (190613).
- Flight Lieutenant Kenneth Macmaster Williamson (4034373).
- Flying Officer Peter Aylmer Wetherill Forrester (1683353).
- Flying Officer Maurice Charles Godfrey (1852356).
- Flying Officer Herbert Marshall (1588422).
- Master Pilot John Joseph Campbell (1349359).
- Master Signaller Isaac Christmas Webb, BEM, (577783).
- 1832987 Flight Sergeant William Norman Frank Wollan.

== Australia ==
=== Knight Bachelor ===
- The Honourable John Alexander Ferguson, OBE, of Roseville, New South Wales. For services to Australian literature and its bibliography.
- The Honourable Mr Justice Richard Clarence Kirby, President, Commonwealth Conciliation and Arbitration Commission.
- Alfred Edward Rowden White, CMG, MD, FRACP, of Toorak, Victoria. For philanthropic services to the advancement of culture and the development of medical research.

=== Order of the Bath ===
==== Companion of the Order of the Bath (CB) ====
Military Division

- Rear Admiral David Hugh Harries, CBE, Royal Australian Navy (Retired).

=== Order of Saint Michael and Saint George ===
==== Companion of the Order of St Michael and St George (CMG) ====
- Maurice Ashkanasy, QC, of Melbourne, Victoria; in recognition of his public and legal services.
- Professor Sydney Sunderland, MD, Chairman, National Radiation Advisory Committee.
- Emeritus Professor Arthur Dale Trendall, Master of University House, and Deputy Vice-Chancellor, Australian National University, Canberra.

=== Order of the British Empire ===
==== Dame Commander of the Order of the British Empire (DBE) ====
Civil Division

- Elizabeth May Ramsay Couchman, OBE, of Toorak, Victoria; in recognition of her public and patriotic services.

==== Knight Commander of the Order of the British Empire (KBE) ====
Civil Division

- William Archer Gunn, CMG, Chairman, Australian Wool Bureau.
- Sir George William Frederick Holland, CBE, MM, National President, Returned Sailors', Soldiers' and Airmen's Imperial League of Australia, 1950–60.

==== Commander of the Order of the British Empire (CBE) ====
Military Division

- Brigadier John Strathord Andersen, OBE, (3/89), Australian Staff Corps.
- Brigadier Cecil Edward Chapman, ED, (2/104052), Royal Australian Artillery.
- Group Captain Keith Raymond John Parsons, DSO, DFC, AFC, Royal Australian Air Force.

Civil Division

- The Reverend Clarence Irving Benson, OBE, Minister of Wesley Church, Melbourne.
- Edward John Bunting, OBE, Secretary, Prime Minister's Department, and Secretary to the Cabinet.
- John Mitchell Burnett, of Killara, New South Wales; in recognition of his services to the Australian manufacturing industry.
- Cyril William Goodman, Chairman and Managing Director, English Electric Company of Australasia Pty Ltd. For public services.
- Eugene Gorman, MC, QC, Chairman, Commonwealth Dried Fruits Export Board.
- Trevor Alfred Housley, General Manager, Overseas Telecommunications Commission (Australia).
- John Lawrence Knott, OBE, Secretary, Department of Supply.
- Phillip Garth Law, Director of the Antarctic Division, Department of External Affairs.
- Reginald George Newton, General Manager (Commercial), The Broken Hill Proprietary Company Ltd. For services to the steel industry.
- Ernest Turnbull, Managing Director, Hoyts Theatres Ltd. For services to charitable movements.

==== Officer of the Order of the British Empire (OBE) ====
Military Division

- Captain George Dalton Tancred, DSC, Royal Australian Navy.
- Lieutenant-Colonel (honorary Colonel) Ethel Jessie Bowe, RRC, (F3/31), Royal Australian Army Nursing Corps (now retired).
- Lieutenant-Colonel John James Stanley Hobbs (1/7503), Australian Staff Corps.
- Lieutenant-Colonel William Leonard Speight (2/50024), Royal Australian Infantry .
- Wing Commander Allan Bruce Catip, DFC, (018161), Citizen Air Force.
- Acting Squadron Leader James Conway Sandercock (04234), Royal Australian Air Force.

Civil Division

- Editha Olga Yseult, Lady Bailey, President, Australian Pre-School Association.
- Emeritus Professor Alan Rowland Chisholm, of Toorak, Victoria. For services to Australian literature.
- Lorna Hazel Craig, MBE, Private Secretary to the Prime Minister.
- Frederick Charles Grey, Commonwealth Public Service Inspector, New South Wales.
- Walter Davis Hardy, Director of Studies, Royal Australian Air Force College, Point Cook, Victoria.
- James Vallins Knight, Secretary, Papua and New Guinea Branch, Returned Sailors', Soldiers' and Airmen's Imperial League of Australia.
- Frederick Andrew James McIntosh, Federal President, Ayrshire Cattle Society of Australia. For services to the Australian cattle industry.
- Norman James Parker, Clerk Assistant, House of Representatives.
- Vincent William Quealy, MBE, First Assistant Secretary, Department of Defence.
- Victor John William Skermer, Secretary and Chief Inspector, Commonwealth Audit Office.
- Hilda Mabel Stevenson, of Toorak, Victoria. For philanthropic services.
- Henry James Stoddart, of Ashfield, New South Wales; in recognition of his services to the Boy Scouts' Movement in Australia.
- Professor Traill Alexander Sutherland, Director of Civil Studies and Professor of Mathematics, Royal Military College, Duntroon.
- William Clarke Taylor, Vice-Chairman, Qantas Empire Airways Ltd.
- James Vernon, General Manager and Director, Colonial Sugar Refining Company Ltd. For public services.

==== Member of the Order of the British Empire (MBE) ====
Military Division

Royal Australian Navy

- Lieutenant-Commander (SD) John William Homewood.

Australian Military Forces

- Major Don Bryant, MC, (4/8001), Australian Staff Corps.
- Lieutenant (Quartermaster) (honorary Captain) Percy Eddington (6/33), Royal Australian Infantry (now retired).
- 1/916 Warrant Officer Class II Colin White Lee, Royal Australian Infantry.
- 3/74140 Warrant Officer Class I Duncan Munro Maclennan, Royal Australian Infantry.
- Major (temporary) (honorary Lieutenant-Colonel) Algernon Montague Neville Rodulfo (3/40092), Australian Staff Corps.
- Major Aubrey Francis Seymour (2/80), Royal Australian Army Medical Corps.
- 3/1047 Warrant Officer Class I Arthur Richard George Wearne, Royal Australian Infantry.

Royal Australian Air Force

- Warrant Officer Charles Albert Walter Lancaster (A31278).
- Warrant Officer George Charles McLean (A3786).
- Warrant Officer Edward John Sommerlad (A1543).
- Warrant Officer Robert Hams Wylie (A2258).

Civil Division

- Margaret Hypatia Adams, President, The Anzac Fellowship of Women.
- Ethel May Bain, of Artarmon, New South Wales. For services to the community.
- Hazel Napier Bedwin, Secretary, Civilian Maimed and Limbless Association of New South Wales.
- Hubert Bedwin, President, Civilian Maimed and Limbless Association of New South Wales.
- Ida Stella Bell, President, Denman Branch, Red Cross Society, New South Wales.
- Howard Buchanan, Honorary Treasurer of the Australian Red Cross Society.
- John Herbert Burt, Chairman of the Board of Directors, St George Hospital, Kogarah, New South Wales.
- Eileen Grace Sally Carlton. For services to the Girl Guides Movement in Western Australia.
- Walter Kennedy Day, JP, President, Lockhart Shire Council, New South Wales.
- Juanita Lillian Digby, JP, Honorary Secretary, North Sydney Branch of the Original Old Age and Invalid Pensioners' Association.
- Charles Herbert McKell Donnelly, Royal Australian Air Force Financial Adviser, Malaya.
- Councillor David William Edis, of Narraburra Shire Council, New South Wales. For public services.
- Charles Hubert Fisenden, Federal President, the Municipal Officers' Association of Australia.
- Douglas James Hall, of Minto, New South Wales; in recognition of his services to the poultry industry and to horticulture.
- Olive Mary Holden, Chairman of the Victoria League in Queensland.
- Gladys Mary Violet Kernaghan, Member of the Executive Committee, Victoria League, South Australia.
- John Bruce Piggott, Chairman of the Council of the National Theatre and Fine Arts Society of Tasmania.
- Edwin Folland Router, Commonwealth Public Service Inspector, Queensland.
- Harold Sharp, JP, Honorary Secretary, Newcastle Branch, Limbless Soldiers' Association, New South Wales.
- Theodore Ernest Shepherd, JP, Honorary Member of the General Committee, Melbourne City Mission, for many years.
- Jessie Sim, Secretary, Tweed Heads Branch, Australian Red Cross Society.
- Captain George Adam Simpson, Master, Pilot Ship Akuna.
- Edward Charles Townshend, of Mount Lawley, Western Australia. For services in the interests of ex-servicemen.
- George Seville Travis, of Pymble, New South Wales. For public services.
- Jean Turley, of Wynnum Central, Queensland. For social welfare services, particularly in connexion with the assimilation of migrants.
- Evelyn Ada West, of Kew, Victoria. For services to public and charitable causes.

=== George Medal (GM) ===
- Captain John Fletcher (2/35094), Australian Staff Corps.

"On the night of the 17th February 1960, Captain Fletcher was in command of an amphibian vehicle which was accompanying some inflatable small craft engaged in an exercise Owing to an unexpected change in the weather this vehicle and some of the small craft were swept off course and capsized in a stretch of water known as "The Rip" where they encountered unpredictable turbulence due to the strong tides In these perilous circumstances Captain Fletcher recovered a life buoy and organised a party around it Seeing that the life preserver of one man was deflated he encouraged the man to hold on to his own shoulders. For three hours he supported this man and inspired and controlled the others of the party Throughout a prolonged ordeal Captain Fletcher displayed exemplary courage and fortitude, It was largely due to his gallantry and leadership that the lives of most of the men about him were saved."

=== British Empire Medal (BEM) ===
Military Division

Royal Australian Navy

- Chief Engineering Mechanic William Sidney Simmonds, ON R34311.

Australian Military Forces

- 2/10S96 Sergeant Arthur Daniel Evans, The Royal Australian Corps of Signals.
- 1/4012 Corporal Allen James Joseph Lightfoot, Royatl Australian Infantry.
- 2/66327 Staff-Sergeant James Malcolm McKenzie, Royal Australian Infantry.
- 1/995 Warrant Officer Class II (temporary) Leslie Angus McMillan, Royal Australian Electrical and Mechanical Engineers.
- 6/1652 Staff-Sergeant Ross Albert Mudge, Royal Australian Army Medical Corps.
- 2/5495 Sergeant Ronald James Porto, Royal Australian Infantry.
- 8/10 Sergeant (temporary) Stevenson Watuna Raragani, Royal Australian Infantry.

Royal Australian Air Force

- A31860 Sergeant Victor Kevin Maloney.
- A5880 Sergeant Cyril James Pearce.
- A21397 Sergeant Alan Keith Richardson.
- A221 Sergeant Charles Christian Schiller.

Civil Division

- Francis Henry Bishop, Housekeeper, Parliament House, Canberra.
- Lindsay Alfred Buncle, Supervisor, Aircraft Maintenance Department, Australia National Airlines Commission.
- Allan Robert Hanrahan, Senior Communications Officer, Grade I, Department Civil Aviation.
- James Frederick Quinn, Supervisor, Chart Department, Hydrographic Branch, Department of the Navy.
- Alexander Edward Savage, Secretary, Victoria Branch of Amalgamated Postal Workers Union.

=== Royal Red Cross (RRC) ===
==== Associate of the Royal Red Cross (ARRC) ====
- Squadron Officer Helen Agnes Cleary (N4452), Royal Australian Air Force Nursing Service.

=== Air Force Cross (AFC) ===
Royal Australian Air Force.

- Flight Lieutenant Colin Gordon Braithwaite (033818).
- Flight Lieutenant Ivan Laurance Grove (034222).

=== Queen's Commendation for Valuable Service in the Air ===
Royal Australian Air Force

- Wing Commander Roy Stewart Royston (033062).
- Squadron Leader Morris Harlock Payne (031468).
- Flight Lieutenant Raymond Francis Fox, DFC (035498).

== Nigeria ==
=== Knight Bachelor ===
- Conrad Swire Kerr Bovell, CMG, Inspector-General of Police.
- Louis Nwachukwu Mbanefo, Chief Justice of the Region.

=== Order of Saint Michael and Saint George ===
==== Companion of the Order of St Michael and St George (CMG) ====
- Roy Pentelow Fenton, Governor, Central Bank of Nigeria.
- Charles Paxton Thompson, OBE, Permanent Secretary, Federal Administrative Service.
- Bruce Greatbatch, CVO, MBE, Secretary to the Premier and Head of the Regional Civil Service.
- Alhaji Haruna, CBE, Emir of Gwandu, and President of the House of Chiefs.
- Saburi Oladeni Biobaku, Secretary to the Premier, and to the Executive Council.
- Oba Bello Gbadegesin, Ladigbolu II, the Alafin of Oyo.

=== Order of the British Empire ===
==== Knight Commander of the Order of the British Empire (KBE) ====
Civil Division

- Alhaji Umar Ibn Muhammed ErAmin El'Kanemi, CMG, CBE, Shehu of Bornu, and a member of the House of Chiefs.

==== Commander of the Order of the British Empire (CBE) ====
Civil Division

- Francis Davidson, Accountant-General.
- Colonel Eric Alfred Hefford, DSO, OBE, Independence Celebrations Officer.
- Maurice John Bennion, MBE, Principal, Institute of Administration.
- Stanley William Charles Holland, Permanent Secretary, Ministry of Local Government.
- James Richard Vincent Arthur Bromage, Permanent Secretary, Ministry of Local Government.

==== Officer of the Order of the British Empire (OBE) ====
Civil Division

- Joseph Adejunmobi Adegbite, Principal, Baptist Academy, Lagos.
- Emmanuel Adigun Oluwole, Senior Superintendent of Police.
- Alfred John Tyrrell, Government Coastal Agent.
- Arthur Gordon Waterman Branch, MD, Senior Medical Officer, (Clinical), Plateau Hospital, Jos.
- Eric Christian Gilles, LRCP, LRCS, formerly Principal, Kano Medical School.
- Abba Habib, Waziri of Dikwa, and formerly a Minister of State.
- Alhaji Muhammadu Sani Yola, MBE, Sarkin Shanu of Kano, Councillor, Kano Native Authority, and District Head, Kano City District.
- Sam Scrutton Richardson, Commissioner for Native Courts.
- Mallam Yahaya Gusau, Secretary of the Executive Council.
- Umo Bassey Duke, a Licensed Surveyor; for public services.
- The Right Reverend Dominic Ignatius Ekandem, Roman Catholic Auxiliary Bishop of Calabar.
- The Reverend Paul Kingston, a former missionary worker.
- The Reverend George Patrick Barnard, in charge of the Church Missionary Society's Mission at Oleh in the Urhobo Division.
- Isaac Odesanwo Dina, Permanent Secretary, Ministry of Economic Planning and Community Development.
- Edward Tavey Sirotkin King, Controller of Works Services, Ministry of Works and Transport.
- Derek Ivor Gilbert Scanlan, MVO, Secretary for Establishment and Organisation, Treasury.

==== Member of the Order of the British Empire (MBE) ====
Military Division

- Lieutenant-Commander Nathaniel Afolabi Pearse, Royal Nigerian Navy.
- Major John Edward Howse Keylock, Royal Nigerian Army.

Civil Division

- Oluyinka Faderin, Staff Pharmacist.
- John Walter Murray, Chief Engineer, Nigerian Broadcasting Corporation.
- Michael Thursby Pitts, Private Secretary to the Governor-General.
- Kenneth Ashmore Ramsden Purdom, Senior Architect, Federal Ministry of Works and Surveys.
- Peter Nwobiora Uyanne, Postal Controller.
- Mallam Abdu Gusau, Resident Engineer, Sokoto Native Authority Works Department.
- Alhaji Ahmadu Rufai Daura, Councillor for Education, Kano Native Authority.
- Annie Paterson Dick, Matron, Sokoto Native Authority Hospital.
- Alhaji Isa Shittu Dutse, Administrative Officer, Class IV.
- Pastor David Lot, a missionary, and a member of the House of Assembly.
- Duncan Henry Robertson, Works Manager, Ministry of Works.
- Chief Francis Joseph Allagoa, Amanyanabo of Nembe, a member of the House of Chiefs.
- Patricia Mabel Ford, Confidential Secretary, Premier's Office.
- Eric MacKay, Works Manager, Ministry of Works.
- Lucy Chibogu Onyechi. For services to the Enugu branch of the Red Cross Society.
- James Mbanugo Romaine, Administrative Officer, Class III.
- John Adeyemi Ayorinde, Officer-in-charge, Cocoa Survey, Ministry of Agriculture and Natural Resources.
- Michael Ajai Fabunmi, formerly Secretary, Class II, Unified Local Government Service (Secretary, Ife Divisional Council).
- Obi Obika Agborbu Gbenoba, the Obi of Agbor.
- Joseph Akanbi Makinde, Principal Agricultural Officer, Ministry of Agriculture and Natural Resources.

=== British Empire Medal (BEM) ===
Military Division

- Petty Officer James Aniabo, Royal Nigerian Navy.
- Squadron Sergeant-Major Baba Potiskum, Royal Nigerian Army.

Civil Division

- Alfred Ikechebelu, Sergeant Major, Nigeria Police Force.
- Mallam Dapci Damboa, Medical Orderly, Bornu Provincial Leprosy Settlement (Sudan United Mission), Northern Region of Nigeria.
- John Michael Onyia, Senior Staff Nurse, Maiduguri General Hospital, Northern Region of Nigeria.
- Reuben Igbokwe Nwokolo, Forest Superintendent, Western Region of Nigeria.

=== Queen's Police Medal (QPM) ===
- Norman Richard Cressy, Deputy Commissioner, Nigeria Police Force.
- Adrian Nichol Merson Davies, Commissioner, Nigeria Police Force.

== Rhodesia and Nyasaland ==
=== Knight Bachelor ===
- Donald MacIntyre, CBE, Federal Minister of Finance.

=== Order of Saint Michael and Saint George ===
==== Companion of the Order of St Michael and St George (CMG) ====
- Joseph William Stanley Pegrum, General Manager of the Rhodesia Railways.

=== Order of the British Empire ===
==== Commander of the Order of the British Empire (CBE) ====
Civil Division

- James Frederick Kapnek. For services to the University College of Rhodesia and Nyasaland.
- Jack William Mills. For public and political services.

==== Officer of the Order of the British Empire (OBE) ====
Military Division

- Lieutenant-Colonel Donald Howard Grainger, Rhodesia and Nyasaland Corps of Signals.
- Wing Commander Archibald Oliver Garfield Wilson, Royal Rhodesian Air Force.

Civil Division

- Frederick William Bridle, Chief Accountant, Ministry of Posts.
- William Huntly Baird Shaw, lately Controller of Customs.
- Robert Williamson. For political and public services.

==== Member of the Order of the British Empire (MBE) ====
Civil Division

- Philip Charles Aldridge, Director of the Association of Rhodesian and Nyasaland Industries.
- Gideon Cornelius du Rand, Senior Superintendent, Prisons Department.
- Ralph George Feltham, lately Federal Counsellor, Her Majesty's Embassy, Lisbon.
- Denis Philip Carew Gumpertz, lately Assistant Secretary, Ministry of Education.
- Captain Joseph Robin Orbell, EM, Deputy Operations Manager, Central African Airways.
- Edith Mary Paul. For public services, especially in Broken Hill.
- Jenny Carmichael Rutherford. For social welfare services rendered under the auspices of public organisations in the Federation.

=== British Empire Medal (BEM) ===
Military Division

- Sergeant Simeon Wanje, 2nd Battalion, The King's African Rifles (Central Africa Rifles).

=== Air Force Cross (AFC) ===
- Squadron Leader Leonard Thomas Patrick Coleman, Royal Rhodesian Air Force.
