= 1958 New Year Honours =

British royal recognitions

The New Year Honours 1958 were appointments in many of the Commonwealth realms of Queen Elizabeth II to various orders and honours to reward and highlight good works by citizens of those countries. They were announced in supplements to the London Gazette of 31 December 1957 to celebrate the year passed and mark the beginning of 1958.

At this time honours for Australians were awarded both in the United Kingdom honours, on the advice of the premiers of Australian states, and also in a separate Australia honours list.

The recipients of honours are displayed here as they were styled before their new honour, and arranged by honour, with classes (Knight, Knight Grand Cross, etc.) and then divisions (Military, Civil, etc.) as appropriate.

== United Kingdom and Commonwealth ==
=== Baronet ===
- Colonel Sir Robert Chapman, CB, CMG, CBE, DSO, TD. For political and public services in the North of England.
- Godfrey Nicholson, MP, Member of Parliament for Morpeth, 1931–1935, and for Farnham since 1937. For political and public services.
- Sir Harry Platt, MD, FRCS. Lately President, Royal College of Surgeons of England.

=== Knight Bachelor ===
- Stanislaus Joseph Baker, CB, Receiver for the Metropolitan Police District.
- Arthur Thomas Barnard, CB, OBE, Director-General of Inspection, Ministry of Supply.
- Walter Barrie, Chairman of Lloyd's.
- George Benson, MP. For public services.
- Professor James Ramsay Montagu Butler, MVO, OBE, Chief Historian, Cabinet Office.
- William Richard Joseph Cook, CB. Deputy Director, Atomic Weapons Research Establishment, Aldermaston, United Kingdom Atomic Energy Authority.
- Alderman Christopher George Armstrong Cowan, JP. For political and public services in Middlesex.
- Henry Kenneth Cowan, MD, MRCP, QHP, Chief Medical Officer, Department of Health for Scotland.
- Alderman William Crane, CBE. For public services in Nottingham. Chairman, Housing Committee, Nottingham County Borough Council.
- Gerard John Regis Leo d'Erlanger, CBE, Chairman, British Overseas Airways Corporation.
- James Boyd Douglas, CBE, JP, Chairman, Southern Area Agricultural Executive Committee, Scotland
- Claude Aurelius Elliott, OBE, Provost of Eton College.
- Stanley Jaffa Harley. For political and public services in the Midlands.
- Major Ernest Sirdefield Harston, CBE, Honorary Secretary, British Empire Service League.
- Frank Cyril Hawker, Director, Bank of England.
- Alderman Frederick Alfred Hoare. Lately Sheriff, City of London.
- Julian Sorell Huxley, Biologist and Writer.
- Christopher Kelk Ingold, Professor of Chemistry, University College London.
- Colonel Colin Norman Thornton-Kemsley, OBE, TD, MP. Member of Parliament for Kincardine and West Aberdeenshire, 1939–1950, and for North Angus and Mearns since 1950. For political and public services.
- Hans Adolf Krebs, MD, Whitley Professor of Biochemistry, University of Oxford. Honorary Director of the Cell Metabolism Research Unit of the Medical Research Council.
- Thomas George Lund, CBE, Secretary of The Law Society.
- Colonel James MacBride Miller, MC, TD, DL, President, Association of County Councils in Scotland. Convener, Berwickshire County Council.
- Kenneth Murray, JP, DL. Lately Chairman, Royal Bank of Scotland.
- Edward James Norman, Chief Inspector of Taxes, Board of Inland Revenue.
- Fred Parkes. For political and public services in Lancashire.
- William Bentley Purchase, CBE, MC, MB, MRCS, one of HM Coroners for the County of London. Honorary Secretary, Coroners Society of England and Wales.
- Halford Walter Lupton Reddish. For political and public services in Rugby.
- Sydney Castle Roberts, Master of Pembroke College, University of Cambridge.
- Foster Gotch Robinson. For public services in Bristol.
- Steven Runciman. (The Honourable James Cochran Stevenson Runciman). For services to Scholarship.
- John Weir Russell. For political services in London.
- Ernest Stacey. For political services in Liverpool.
- Hubert Gordon Thornley, CBE, DL, Clerk of the Peace and Clerk of the County Council, North Riding of Yorkshire.
- Ashley Skelton Ward. For political and public services in Sheffield.
- Alderman Daniel Thomas Williams, OBE, JP, DL. For political and public services in Cardiff.
- Walter John Worboys, Chairman, Council of Industrial Design. Director, Imperial Chemical Industries, Ltd. Vice-President, Associated British Chemical Manufacturers.

State of Tasmania

- Archibald Richard Park, CMG, Lord Mayor of the City of Hobart, State of Tasmania.

State of Victoria

- William George Dismore Upjohn, OBE, MD, FRCS, of Melbourne, State of Victoria. For services to Surgery.
- John Francis Williams, Managing Director of The Herald and Weekly Times, Ltd., Melbourne, State of Victoria.

Commonwealth Relations

- Owain Trevor Jenkins, a member of the United Kingdom business community in India.

Overseas Territories

- Michael Joseph Patrick Hogan, CMG, QC, Chief Justice, Hong Kong.
- Yusufali Alibhai Karimjee Jivanjee. For public services in Tanganyika.
- Audley McKisack, QC, Chief Justice, Uganda.
- George William Kelly Roberts, CBE, JP. For public services in the Bahamas.

=== Order of the Bath ===
==== Knight Grand Cross of the Order of the Bath (GCB) ====
Military Division

- Admiral Sir John Arthur Symons Eccles, KCB, KCVO, CBE.

==== Knight Commander of the Order of the Bath (KCB) ====
Military Division

Royal Navy

- Vice-Admiral Robert Francis Elkins, CB, CVO, OBE.
- Vice-Admiral Richard George Onslow, CB, DSO.

Army

- Lieutenant-General Harold English Pyman, CB, CBE, DSO, (42251), late Royal Armoured Corps.

Royal Air Force

- Air Marshal Edmund Cuthbert Hudleston, CB, CBE.
- Air Vice-Marshal Arthur William Baynes McDonald, CB, AFC.

Civil Division

- Harry Work Melville, Secretary, Department of Scientific and Industrial Research.

==== Companion of the Order of the Bath (CB) ====
Military Division

Royal Navy

- Rear-Admiral Peter Dawnay, MVO, DSC.
- Rear-Admiral Roy Stephenson Foster-Brown.
- Rear-Admiral John Paul Wellington Furse, OBE.
- Acting Vice-Admiral Douglas Eric Holland-Martin, DSO, DSC.
- Captain Edgar Duncan Goodenough Lewin, CBE, DSO, DSC, Royal Navy.
- Rear-Admiral George Oswald Naish.
- Surgeon Rear-Admiral Eric Thomas Sutherland Rudd, CBE, MB, BCh.
- Rear-Admiral George Arthur Thring, DSO.
- Rear-Admiral Roger Stanley Wellby, DSO.
- Rear-Admiral Guy Austin Moore Wilson.

Army

- Major-General Douglas Bluett, OBE, QHP, MB, (35617), late Royal Army Medical Corps.
- Major-General James Norman Carter, CBE, (34655), late Infantry.
- Major-General Guy Patrick Gregson, CBE, DSO, MC, (34436), late Royal Regiment of Artillery.
- Major-General John Winthrop Hackett, CBE, DSO, MC, (52752), late Royal Armoured Corps.
- Major-General Reginald Hackett Hewetson, CBE, DSO, (40386), late Royal Regiment of Artillery.
- Major-General Douglas Anthony Kendrew, CBE, DSO, (44766), late Infantry.
- Major-General Alfred Henry Musson, CBE, (6094), late Royal Regiment of Artillery.
- Major-General Cosmo Alexander Richard Nevill, CBE, DSO, (38525), late Infantry.
- Brigadier (temporary) James Alexander Rowland Robertson, CBE, DSO, (384323), late Infantry.
- Major-General Leslie de Malapert Thuillier, OBE, (34405), late Royal Corps of Signals.

Royal Air Force

- Air Vice-Marshal Victor Swanton Bowling, CBE.
- Air Vice-Marshal Frank Westerman Felgate, CBE.
- The Reverend Canon Alan Stanley Giles, CBE, QHC.
- Air Vice-Marshal John Forde Hobler, CBE.
- Air Vice-Marshal Frederick Elvy Lipscomb, CBE, MRCS, LRCP, QHP, (Retired).
- Air Vice-Marshal Wilfrid Ewart Oulton, CBE, DSO, DFC.
- Acting Air Vice-Marshal Eric Cecil Bates, CBE, AFC.
- Air Commodore Harold John Maguire, DSO, OBE.

Civil Division

- John Clifford Blake, Solicitor and Legal Adviser, Ministry of Health and Ministry of Housing and Local Government.
- Reginald Samuel Brownell, CBE, Permanent Secretary, Ministry of Education for Northern Ireland.
- Hayne Constant, CBE, Director, National Gas Turbine Establishment, Ministry of Supply.
- Colonel Philip Ralph Davies-Cooke, TD, JP, DL, Chairman, Territorial and Auxiliary Forces Association of the Comities of Denbigh and Flint.
- Joshua Edward Synge Cooper, CMG, Assistant Director, Government Communications Headquarters.
- Arthur Charles Walter Drew, Deputy Under-Secretary of State, War Office.
- Eric John Horatio Edenborough, OBE, Clerk of the Journals, House of Commons.
- Collis William Evans, CBE, Under-secretary, Ministry of Transport and Civil Aviation.
- Frank Chalton Francis, Keeper, Department of Printed Books, British Museum.
- David Hulse Leadbetter, Under-Secretary, Ministry of Education.
- William Wilfred Morton, Secretary, Board of Inland Revenue.
- John Francis Mountain, Under-Secretary, Admiralty.
- Francis William Musson, CMG, AFC, Under-Secretary, attached Foreign Office.
- John Edward Serby, CBE, Director-General, Guided Weapons, Ministry of Supply.
- Herbert Tetley, Deputy Government Actuary.

=== Order of Saint Michael and Saint George ===
==== Knight Grand Cross of the Order of St Michael and St George (GCMG) ====
- The Most Honourable Gerald Rufus, Marquess of Reading, KCMG, CBE, MC, TD, QC. Leader of the United Kingdom Delegation to the Colombo Plan Consultative Committee Meeting, 1957. Minister of State for Foreign Affairs, 1953–1957. For public services.
- Sir Michael Robert Wright, KCMG, Her Majesty's Ambassador Extraordinary and Plenipotentiary in Baghdad.

==== Knight Commander of the Order of St Michael and St George (KCMG) ====
- Howard George Charles Mallaby, CMG, OBE, High Commissioner for the United Kingdom in New Zealand.
- The Honourable Alan James Mansfield, Chief Justice of the State of Queensland.
- Geofroy William Tory, CMG, High Commissioner for the United Kingdom in the Federation of Malaya.
- The Right Reverend Wilfred Marcus Askwith, DD, The Lord Bishop of Gloucester, Prelate of the Most Distinguished Order of Saint Michael and Saint George.
- Alexander Thomas Williams, CMG, MBE, Governor and Commander-in-Chief, Leeward Islands.
- William Denis Allen, CB, CMG, Foreign Office.
- Edgar James Joint, CMG, OBE, Her Majesty's Ambassador Extraordinary and Plenipotentiary in Bogotá.
- George Humphrey Middleton, CMG, Her Majesty's Ambassador Extraordinary and Plenipotentiary in Beirut.

==== Companion of the Order of St Michael and St George (CMG) ====
- Major-General William Alfred Dimoline, CB, CBE, DSO, MC, Secretary, British Group, Inter-Parliamentary Union.
- Archibald Laurence Patrick Kirwan, TD, Director and Secretary, Royal Geographical Society.
- Cyril Edward Thorogood, United Kingdom Trade Commissioner, Colombo.
- Frederick William Verry, OBE, Assistant Secretary, Air Ministry.
- The Honourable Gilbert Lawrence Chandler, Minister of Agriculture, State of Victoria.
- Edgar Rowland Dawes. For public services in the State of South Australia.
- John Fitzsimmons Meynink, a Grazier in the State of Queensland. For public services.
- Allan Frederick Bates, Financial Secretary, Cyprus.
- Conrad Swire Kerr Bovell, Inspector-General, Nigeria Police Force.
- Brigadier Norman Baldwin Brading, CBE, House Governor, University College Hospital, Ibadan, Federation of Nigeria.
- Anthony Geoffrey Hopwood Gardner-Brown. For services as Deputy Chief Secretary of the Federation of Nigeria.
- Claude Bramall Burgess, OBE, Cadet Officer, Staff Grade, Hong Kong.
- Alan Hart Dutton, MVO, Financial Secretary, Aden.
- John Orman Gilbert, British Resident, Brunei.
- Geoffrey Leicester Gray, OBE, Secretary for Local Government, North Borneo.
- Douglas Basil Hall, Secretary for Native Affairs, Northern Rhodesia.
- Hugh Alastair Harding, Assistant Secretary, Colonial Office.
- Kenneth William Stewart Mackenzie, Secretary to the Treasury, Kenya.
- Victor George Matthews, OBE, Commissioner, East African Office, London.
- James Patrick Murray, Senior Provincial Commissioner, Northern Rhodesia.
- The Right Reverend Cecil John Patterson, CBE, The Lord Bishop of the Niger.
- William Henry Justinus Rangeley, Provincial Commissioner, Nyasaland.
- James Taylor Rea, President of the City Council, Singapore.
- John Shaw Rennie, OBE, British Resident Commissioner, New Hebrides.
- Charles Anthony Langdon Richards, Resident, Buganda, Uganda.
- Colonel William Lancelot Rolleston, OBE, Minister for Communications and Works, Tanganyika.
- Kenneth Graeme Stewart Smith, Colonial Secretary, Gambia.
- Anthony Charles Christopher Swann, OBE, Provincial Commissioner, Kenya.
- Brian St. George Thwaites, Administrative Officer, Class I, Eastern Region, Nigeria.
- Lieutenant-Colonel Geoffrey Charles White, OBE, Chief Constable, Cyprus Police Force.
- Brigadier John Edmund Alexander Baird, CBE, Military Adviser to the Political Resident, Bahrain.
- Evelyn Basil Boothby, Counsellor at Her Majesty's Embassy, Brussels.
- Bernard Christopher Allen Cook, OBE. Lately Counsellor (Commercial) at Her Majesty's Embassy, Rangoon.
- Sydney Ernest Henry Daw, CBE. Lately Counsellor (Commercial) at Her Majesty's Embassy in Vienna.
- Hubert John Evans, Her Majesty's Ambassador Extraordinary and Plenipotentiary in Seoul.
- Leslie Charles Glass, Counsellor and Consul-General at Her Majesty's Embassy in Washington.
- Aubrey Seymour Halford, Political Agent at Kuwait.
- Angus MacKay MacKintosh, Deputy Commissioner-General, Singapore.
- Harry Frank Grave Morris, Foreign Office.
- Derek Martin Hurry Riches, Foreign Office.
- Roderick Francis Gisbert Sarell, Her Majesty's Consul-General at Algiers.
- John Hugh Adam Watson, Foreign Office.

=== Royal Victorian Order ===
==== Knight Grand Cross of the Royal Victorian Order (GCVO) ====
- Sir Stewart Duke-Elder, KCVO, MD, FRCS.
- Vice-Admiral Sir (Edward Michael) Conolly Abel Smith, KCVO, CB.

==== Knight Commander of the Royal Victorian Order (KCVO) ====
- Charles Thomas Wheeler, CBE.

==== Commander of the Royal Victorian Order (CVO) ====
- Major Mark Vane Milbank, MVO, MC.

==== Member of the Royal Victorian Order (MVO) ====
At this time the two lowest classes of the Royal Victorian Order were "Member (fourth class)" and "Member (fifth class)", both with post-nominal letters MVO. "Member (fourth class)" was renamed "Lieutenant" (LVO) from the 1985 New Year Honours onwards.

Fourth Class

- Henry Barraclough.
- Ernest James Braby, MBE.
- Geoffrey Dearmer.
- Albert James Galpin, OBE, MVO.
- Joseph Mackle.
- Donald Morrell, ISO.
- Commander Harry Desmond Nixon, Royal Navy.
- Arthur Frederick Abbott Stamberg, MVO.

Fifth Class

- Elizabeth Vere Drummond, Baroness Birdwood.
- Anne Alicia Hamersley.
- Lieutenant-Commander (S.D.) Eric Colin Hill, Royal Navy.
- Alice Saxby.

=== Order of the British Empire ===
==== Knight Grand Cross of the Order of the British Empire (GBE) ====
Military Division

- Air Chief Marshal Sir Donald Hardman, KCB, OBE, DFC, Royal Air Force.

Civil Division

- Sir Harold Edgar Yarrow, Bt., CBE, Chairman and Managing Director, Yarrow & Co. Ltd., Glasgow.

==== Dame Commander of the Order of the British Empire (DBE) ====
Military Division

- Brigadier Cecilie Monica Johnson, RRC, QHNS, ADC (Hon.), (206240), Queen Alexandra's Royal Army Nursing Corps.

Civil Division

- Alderman Mary Latchford Kingsmill Jones, CBE, JP. For public services in the City of Manchester.
- Rose Macaulay, Writer.

==== Knight Commander of the Order of the British Empire (KBE) ====
Military Division

Royal Navy

- Vice-Admiral Ballin Illingworth Robertshaw, CB, CBE.
- Surgeon Vice-Admiral Robert Cyril May, CB, OBE, MC, FRCS, QHS.

Army

- Lieutenant-General Richard Wakefield Goodbody, CB, DSO, (26967), late Royal Regiment of Artillery. Colonel Commandant, Royal Regiment of Artillery.

Royal Air Force

- Air Marshal Hugh Alex Constantine, CB, CBE, DSO.
- Air Marshal Patrick Brunton Lee Potter, CBE, MD, ChB, QHS.

Civil Division

- Maurice Edward Adams, OBE, Civil Engineer-in-Chief, Admiralty.
- Neville Archibald Gass, CBE, MC, Chairman, British Petroleum Company, Ltd.
- Arthur Douglas Owen, CB, Deputy Chairman, Board of Customs and Excise.
- Major-General William Ronald Campbell Penney, CB, CBE, DSO, MC, lately Director, London Communications Security Agency.
- Brigadier George Hands Walton, CB, CBE, TD, DL, Chairman, Territorial and Auxiliary Forces Association, County Durham.
- Ian Leslie Henderson, CMG, Her Majesty's Ambassador Extraordinary and Plenipotentiary in Panama.
- The Honourable Stanley Charles Burbury, Chief Justice of the State of Tasmania.
- The Honourable Patrick Bisset Fletcher, CMG, a Minister in the Government of Southern Rhodesia continuously since 1946; at present Minister of Native Affairs, Lands, Irrigation and Surveys.
- The Honourable Roslyn Foster Bowie Philp, Senior Puisne Judge of the Supreme Court, State of Queensland.
- Sir Sydney Phillipson, CMG. For services to education in the Federation of Nigeria.
- Alhaji Muhammadu Sanusi, CMG, Emir of Kano, Northern Region, Nigeria.
- Sir Newnham Arthur Worley. President of the Court of Appeal for Eastern Africa.

==== Commander of the Order of the British Empire (CBE) ====
Military Division

Royal Navy

- Commodore Eric Arthur Divers, OBE, RD, Royal Naval Reserve.
- Commodore Thomas Elder, DSC, Royal Fleet Auxiliary Service.
- Captain John Graham Hamilton.
- Captain Frank Edward Weatherston Lammert, OBE, DSC, VRD, Malayan Royal Naval Volunteer Reserve.
- Colonel Bruce John David Lumsden, OBE, Royal Marines (Retired).
- Captain James Guy Trench Western.

Army

- Brigadier (temporary) Theodore Henry Birkbeck, DSO, (44960), late Infantry.
- Colonel and Chief Paymaster George Bernard Arthur Brayden (1046), Royal Army Pay Corps (now retired).
- Brigadier (temporary) Oliver George Brooke, DSO, MBE, (52572), late Infantry.
- Colonel Henry Gray Croly (44833), late Royal Regiment of Artillery.
- Brigadier (temporary) Cyril Carew Graham, DSO, OBE, (391327), late Infantry.
- Brigadier John Chambers Hardy (34453), late Royal Corps of Signals.
- Brigadier Arthur Henry Musgrave Morris, DSO, MC, GM, (30546), late Corps of Royal Engineers (now Regular Army Reserve of Officers).
- Colonel (temporary) Frederick Alfred James Pratt, OBE, (355479), Corps of Royal Engineers (now retired).
- Colonel William Quincey Roberts, DSO, MVO, OBE, TD, ADC, JP, (56230), Territorial Army.
- Colonel John Roger Cordy-Simpson, OBE, MC, (49810), late Royal Armoured Corps.
- Colonel John Edward Stracey Stone, OBE, (58134), late Infantry.
- Brigadier (temporary) Vivian Wakefield Street, DSO, OBE, MC, (53698), late Infantry.
- Brigadier John William Tweedie, DSO, (36906), late Infantry.
- Brigadier (temporary) John Graham Claverhouse Waldron, DSO, OBE, (44198), late Infantry.
- Colonel (temporary) (now Lieutenant-Colonel) John Castle Woollett, OBE, MC, (66051), Corps of Royal Engineers.
- Brigadier (temporary) Peter George Francis Young, OBE, (53743), late Infantry.
- Brigadier William Harrison Bordass, OBE, MC, Staff Officer to the Inspector-General, Home Guard, Federation of Malaya.

Royal Air Force

- Air Commodore Henry Gordon Blair.
- Air Commodore Cecil Thomas Weir, DFC.
- Air Commodore George Holford White, OBE.
- Group Captain Reginald Henry Clifford Burwell, OBE, DFC.
- Group Captain Harold John Hobbs.
- Group Captain Henry Egbert Hopkins, DFC, AFC.
- Group Captain Donald Henry Lee, DFC.
- Group Captain David Cecil McKinley, DFC, AFC.
- Group Captain Hugh Cuthbert Sutcliffe Pimblett, MD, BS.
- Group Captain Peter Russell Walker, DSO, DFC.
- Group Captain Freke William Wiseman-Clarke, MBE.

Civil Division

- Andrew Basil Acheson, CMG, Assistant Secretary, Cabinet Office.
- Stanley James Scott Adamson, JP. For political and public services in Glasgow.
- George Cyril Allen, Member of the Monopolies Commission. Professor of Political Economy, University of London.
- William Robert Allerton, lately Chairman, Rural District Councils Association.
- Philip Henry Andrews, Assistant Secretary, Ministry of Agriculture, Fisheries and Food.
- William Atkinson, JP, Chairman, Cumberland Agricultural Executive Committee.
- Eric Harold Ball, Managing Director, The British Thomson-Houston Co. Ltd., Rugby, Warwickshire.
- John Barber. For political and public services in Doncaster.
- Sir (Horace) Owen Compton Beasley, OBE, President, Pensions Appeals Tribunals for England and Wales.
- Ernest Guy Bigwood, JP, Alderman, Worcestershire County Council.
- Cecil Reginald Burch, Warren Research Fellow in Physics, University of Bristol.
- Alderman Gladys Buxton, JP, Chairman, Derbyshire County Council.
- Alderman Sir (William) Hugh Stobart Chance, DL. For political and public services in the Midlands.
- William Reginald Clemens, JP. For public services in Middlesex.
- Robert Philipps Clunas, Chief Engineer, SS Queen Elizabeth, The Cunard Steamship Company, Ltd.
- Denis Charles Scott Compton. For services to Sport.
- Albert Edward Crook CBE, Principal Inspector of Mechanical Engineering, Mines Inspectorate, Ministry of Power.
- Clifford Michael Curzon, Pianist.
- Eric Walter Dean, Assistant Solicitor, Board of Trade.
- Frederic Thomas Lloyd-Dodd, OBE, MP, Chairman, Ulster Savings Committee.
- Geoffrey Grabham Drewe, CIE, OBE. For political services
- Godfrey Rolles Driver, MC, Professor of Semitic Philology, University of Oxford.
- Bertram Clough Williams-Ellis, MC, JP. For public services.
- Harry Julius Emeléus, Professor of Inorganic Chemistry, University of Cambridge.
- Professor Rhydwyn Harding Evans, Chairman, University of Leeds Joint Recruiting Board.
- John Stoddart Forrest, Director-General, House Coal Distribution (Emergency) Scheme.
- The Right Honourable Margaret Helen, Countess Fortescue, National President, Young Women's Christian Association.
- Helen Fox, JP. For political and public services in Cumberland.
- Henry Thomas Fry, OBE, Assistant Secretary, War Office.
- Alderman Charles William Gascoigne, BEM. For public services in Sheffield.
- The Right Honourable Ross Campbell, Baron Geddes, DL, Director, Geddes & Co. Ltd. (Edinburgh).
- Keith Granville, Commercial Director, British Overseas Airways Corporation.
- Hugh Wingate Greany, General Manager, The Shipping Federation, Ltd.
- Hildebrand Wolfe Harvey, Senior Principal Scientific Officer, Laboratory of the Marine Biological Association of the United Kingdom, Plymouth.
- May Agnes Florence Elizabeth Haughton, OBE, Chairman, Northern Ireland Council of Social Service. For services in aid of refugees.
- Charles Edward Ronald Hayward, Chief Lands Officer, Air Ministry.
- John Francis Hedges. For political services in Wessex.
- Barbara Hepworth, Sculptress.
- Captain Robert Roy Scott Hewett. For services as Alderman, City of London.
- Wilfred Lanceley Heywood, OBE, lately General Secretary, National Union of Dyers, Bleachers and Textile Workers.
- Colonel Laurence Hugh Higgon, MC. For public services in Pembrokeshire.
- Terence William Ivan Hodgkinson, Keeper, Victoria and Albert Museum.
- Leonard Arthur Houl, Director of Technical Costings, Ministry of Supply.
- Lorimer Hughes, Deputy Chief Veterinary Officer, Ministry of Agriculture, Fisheries and Food.
- Vernon Arthur Moore Hunt, Director, Civil Aviation Control and Navigation Directorate, Ministry of Transport and Civil Aviation.
- John Ritchie Inch, Chief Constable, City Police, Edinburgh.
- Alderman William Gladstone James, MC. For political and public services in Cambridge.
- Christopher Hollis Johnson, Director, Materials and Explosives Research and Development, Ministry of Supply.
- Harold Thomas Johnson, OBE, Deputy Director of Naval Construction, Admiralty.
- Alice Crawford Johnston, OBE, Social Services Administrator, Women's Voluntary Services. For services in aid of refugees.
- Alfred Kemp, Assistant Secretary, General Post Office.
- Sylvia Edith Lehfeldt, OBE, Assistant Secretary, Ministry of Pensions and National Insurance.
- Alan de Verd Leigh, MBE, Secretary, London Chamber of Commerce.
- Richard Dawnay Lemon, Chief Constable, Hampshire Constabulary.
- Gordon Lilico, MB, lately Principal Medical Officer, Ministry of Health.
- Duncan Douglas Livesey, OBE, Chairman, Liverpool Trades Advisory Council for National Savings.
- Henry Bristow McCance, Chairman of Council, Linen Industry Research Association.
- James Logie MacDonald, Chairman, Highland Agricultural Executive Committee.
- Frederick Louis MacNeice, Writer and Poet.
- Alexander Macrae, BEM, JP. For political and public services in Ross and Cromarty.
- Brigadier William Morgan Tilson Magan, OBE, attached War Office.
- Michael Edward Mahony, Deputy Director of Stores, Admiralty.
- Madame Alicia Markova (Alicia Marks). For services to Ballet.
- James Alfred Mason, MM, Manager and Director, Automatic Telephone & Electric Co. Ltd., Liverpool.
- John Campbell McIntyre Matheson, DSO, MB, ChB, Principal Medical Officer, HM Prison Brixton.
- Peter Brian Medawar, Professor of Zoology and Comparative Anatomy, University College, London.
- Arthur Barry Proger Meggitt, OBE, JP. For political services in Glamorgan.
- Oliver Hilary Sambourne Messel. For services to Theatrical Design.
- Clifford Metcalfe, Managing Director, EMI Electronics, Ltd., Hayes, Middlesex.
- Boris Ord. (Bernhard Boris Ord). For services to Music in the University of Cambridge.
- Mary Ormerod, Chairman, Board of Governors, the Bethlem Royal Hospital and the Maudsley Hospital.
- Robert Henry Pearce, Managing Director, Albert Mill, Royton, Lancashire. For services to the cotton industry.
- Charles Spurgeon Petheram, MC, Chief Officer, Welfare Department, London County Council.
- Martin John Langley Pulling, OBE, Controller, Television Service Engineering, British Broadcasting Corporation.
- George Adam Reay, OBE, Superintendent, Torry Research Station, Food Investigation Organisation, Department of Scientific and Industrial Research.
- David James Rees. For services to Golf.
- Ian Archibald Richmond, Professor of the Archaeology of the Roman Empire, University of Oxford.
- Reginald Ringham, Chairman, East Midlands Division, National Coal Board.
- Gwilym Roberts, Regional Controller, Eastern Region, Board of Trade.
- James Robertson, JP, County Clerk and Treasurer, Caithness.
- James Charles Evitt Robinson, JP, Chairman, Bedford Agricultural Executive Committee.
- Lambert Charles Rogers, VRD, MD, FRCS, Professor of Surgery, University of Wales.
- William Colin Campbell Rose, Assistant Secretary, Ministry of Power.
- Kenneth Patrick Rush. For political services in Kent.
- Seymour Cochrane Shanks, MD, FRCP, Director, X-Ray Diagnostic Department, University College Hospital.
- George Dixon Sharman, Assistant Secretary, Department of Agriculture for Scotland.
- John Galloway Small, Collector, London Port, Board of Customs and Excise.
- Robert William Speaight, Actor and Author.
- Lieutenant-Colonel George Henderson Stevenson, OBE, MC, MB, FRCS(Ed.), lately Chairman, Executive Committee, British Red Cross Society (Scottish Branch).
- William Arthur Summers, Managing Director, Hunting Percival Aircraft, Ltd.
- Sir Geoffrey Ernest Tritton, Bt, MBE. For political and public services in Wiltshire.
- William Hubert Vaughan, OBE. For public services in Wales.
- Jacqueline Hope-Wallace, Assistant Secretary, National Assistance Board.
- Geraint Gwynn Walters, Director for Wales, Ministry of Works.
- Anthony Edward Walter Ward, Assistant Solicitor, Ministry of Pensions and National Insurance.
- Ralph Winton West, Principal, Battersea College of Technology.
- Gerald Stuart Wheeldon, Chief Estate Officer, Ministry of Housing and Local Government.
- Morris Stewart Whitehouse, MBE, Chairman, Brick Development Association. Chairman, Sussex and Dorking Brick Company.
- Mabel Shaw Whittaker, JP. For political and public services in Manchester.
- Alfred Lancelot Willett, lately President, National Federation of Corn Trade Associations.
- Emily May Williams, Principal, Whitelands Training College, Putney.
- John Wilson, MC, Director of Research, British Rayon Research Association.
- Alan Barraclough, Office Manager, English Electric Export & Trading Co. Ltd., New York.
- Major Frederick Charles Leslie Chauncy, OBE, Her Majesty's Consul-General at Muscat.
- Thomas Lowe Ferguson, OBE, British subject resident in Brussels.
- James Charles Jones, General Manager of the Central Railway of Paraguay.
- Richard Chades Leach, General Manager and Director of Burma Corporation (1951) Ltd.
- Enid Devoge McLeod, OBE, British Council Representative in France.
- Peter Clephan Palmer, First Secretary at Her Majesty's Embassy in Washington.
- Albert George Whitfield, Manager of the Ottoman Bank in Amman.
- Trevor Vernon Woods, MBE, General Manager of the Antofagasta-Bolivia Railway.
- William Elmslie Wilkie-Brown, a member of the United Kingdom community in Pakistan.
- Herbert John Drummond Elliot, OBE, Senior District Officer, Basutoland.
- John Corrigan Glass, of Sydney, State of New South Wales. For services to the Theatre.
- Lieutenant-Colonel Harold Jackson, Commissioner of the British South Africa Police, Southern Rhodesia.
- William Edward Lancaster, lately Director of Veterinary Services, Federation of Malaya.
- Brigadier George Furner Langley, DSO, ED, formerly Principal, Melbourne High School, and a Member of the Schools' Board, State of Victoria.
- Courtenay Robert Latimer, OBE, Secretary for Finance, High Commissioner's Office, Basutoland, the Bechuanaland Protectorate and Swaziland.
- Donald Mackinnon. For public services in the State of Victoria.
- Clarence Roy McKerihan, President of the Rural Bank, State of New South Wales.
- William Henry Murphy. For public and philanthropic services in the State of Victoria.
- Thomas Flood Plunkett. For services to the dairying industry in the State of Queensland.
- Alexander Maurice Ramsay, General Manager of the Housing Trust, State of South Australia.
- Harold Service, lately Director, Geological Survey, Federation of Malaya.
- Lieutenant-Colonel Alick Vernie Stark, OBE, ED, Official Secretary to the Governor of the State of Queensland.
- Cecil James Watt, a Member of the Public Service Board, State of New South Wales.
- Neville Noel Ashenheim, Chairman of the Industrial Development Corporation, Jamaica.
- John Edward Barker, Overseas Audit Service, Director of Federal Audit, Nigeria.
- Alexander Brown, FRCP (Ed.), Professor of Medicine and Head of the Department of Medicine, University College, Ibadan, Federation of Nigeria.
- Iqbal Chand Chopra, OBE, QC. For public services in Tanganyika.
- Inaco Conforzi. For public services in Nyasaland.
- Reginald Alfred Crofts, Adviser on Production and Marketing, Western Region, Nigeria.
- Trewavas Pearce Eddy, MRCS, LRCP, Director of Medical Services, Sierra Leone.
- George Arthur Cyril Farnum, OBE, JP. For public services in British. Guiana.
- Wilfred Neill Foster, Petroleum Technologist, Trinidad.
- Donald Livingston Gunn, Director, International Red Locust Control Service, Northern Rhodesia.
- John Havilland Proctor Hawtrey, Chief Civil Engineer, Office of the Crown Agents for Oversea Governments and Administrations.
- Walter Webb Lewis-Jones. Lately Director of Education, Fiji, now Director of Education, Tanganyika.
- Lee Iu Cheung, OBE, JP. For public services in Hong Kong.
- John Charles Rookwood Proud, OBE, Director of Broadcasting, Cyprus.
- John Louis Riddoch, OBE. For public services in Kenya.
- Griffith Greenwich Roberts Sharp, OBE, Chairman of the Agricultural Development Corporation, Jamaica.
- Francis William John Skutil, Director of Marine, Federation of Nigeria, and Director (designate) of the Nigeria Naval Services.
- George Alexander Phimster Sutherland. For public services in Singapore.
- Edwin Alfred Trim, OBE, MD, BCh, Director of Medical Services, Uganda.
- Hereward Trott Watlington. For public services in Bermuda.

==== Officer of the Order of the British Empire (OBE) ====
Military Division

Royal Navy

- Lieutenant-Colonel Francis Doyne Godfrey Bird, Royal Marines.
- Commander Frederick Charles Burge.
- Acting Captain Reginald Burrell, (Retired).
- Commander John Courtenay Evered Burston.
- Surgeon Lieutenant-Commander David Geoffrey Dalgliesh, MRCS, LRCP.
- The Reverend Percy Malby Dodwell, Chaplain.
- Commander Kenneth Leeming Elder.
- Commander Richard Thomas Hale, Royal New Zealand Navy.
- Commander Richard Lewis.
- Surgeon Commander (D) Alastair Macdonald Watson, LDS.
- Commander Peter John Thornhill, (Retired).
- Commander Herbert Aubrey Walkinshaw, VRD, Royal Naval Volunteer Reserve.
- Lieutenant-Commander Robert Stanley Woolrych.

Army

- Lieutenant-Colonel Ronald George Baker (205385), Royal Corps of Signals.
- Lieutenant-Colonel (temporary) Harold William Baldwin (166728), Corps of Royal Engineers.
- Lieutenant-Colonel Arthur George Barton, TD, (86419), Corps of Royal Engineers, Army Emergency Reserve.
- Lieutenant-Colonel Reginald George Shelford Bidwell (56587), Royal Regiment of Artillery.
- Lieutenant-Colonel James Edwin Bowles (150704), Army Catering Corps.
- Lieutenant-Colonel John Patrick Browne (185587), Royal Army Ordnance Corps.
- Lieutenant-Colonel Stewart Louis Anderson Carter, MBE, MC, (50221), The Sherwood Foresters (Nottinghamshire and Derbyshire Regiment) (Employed List (I)).
- Lieutenant-Colonel William Alexander Carlton Collingwood, MBE, (64582), The Royal Northumberland Fusiliers.
- Lieutenant-Colonel (temporary) Frederick William Coombes, MC, (95564), Royal Tank Regiment, Royal Armoured Corps.
- Lieutenant-Colonel Richard Crawshaw (197561), The Parachute Regiment, Territorial Army.
- Lieutenant-Colonel (now Colonel (temporary)) William Paul Crow (52790), The Loyal Regiment (North Lancashire) (Employed List (T)).
- Lieutenant-Colonel David John Francis Grant, MBE, (44857), Royal Regiment of Artillery.
- Lieutenant-Colonel Arthur Calveley Hordern (47815), The Royal Warwickshire Regiment (Employed List (I)).
- Lieutenant-Colonel George Arnold Jackson, TD, (51838), Royal Regiment of Artillery, Territorial Army.
- Lieutenant-Colonel Frederick Leigh Knight, TD, (124254), The King's Royal Rifle Corps, Territorial Army.
- Lieutenant-Colonel (acting) Arthur Frederick Lace, TD, (21698), Combined Cadet Force.
- Lieutenant-Colonel (acting) (now Major (acting)) Charles Steven Lang (44650), Combined Cadet Force.
- Lieutenant-Colonel Arthur John Leahy, MBE, (63550), Royal Corps of Signals.
- Lieutenant-Colonel Alexander Walter Duncan Lewis, MC, (189059), The Royal Scots Greys (2nd Dragoons), Royal Armoured Corps.
- Lieutenant-Colonel John Macdonald (243069), The King's Own Scottish Borderers (Employed List (I)).
- Lieutenant-Colonel Charles McNeil, MB, (72154), Royal Army Medical Corps.
- Lieutenant-Colonel James Frederick Charles Mellor, DSO, (56720), The King's Royal Rifle Corps.
- Lieutenant-Colonel (temporary) John Henry Moss, MBE, (122458), Corps of Royal Engineers.
- The Reverend Ivan Delacherois Neill, Chaplain to the Forces 2nd Class (89720), Royal Army Chaplains' Department.
- Lieutenant-Colonel Harold Nelson (158194), Corps of Royal Engineers.
- Lieutenant-Colonel (now Colonel) Geoffrey William Noakes, TD, (70509), Territorial Army.
- Lieutenant-Colonel Derek Brian O'Flaherty (65652), Royal Army Service Corps.
- Lieutenant-Colonel Robert John O'Lone, DSO, (380183), The Royal Ulster Rifles.
- Lieutenant-Colonel (temporary) Caryl Howard Palmer, MC, (71396), Royal Regiment of Artillery.
- Lieutenant-Colonel (honorary) Richard Bessant Randall, TD, (53956), Combined Cadet Force (now retired).
- Lieutenant-Colonel Reginald Hugh Ripley, MBE, (53712), The Cheshire Regiment (Employed List (I)).
- Lieutenant-Colonel (Staff Quartermaster) Charles Hanson Roberts (101015), (Employed List (2)).
- Lieutenant-Colonel Richard Graham Scott Saunders (66186), Royal Tank Regiment, Royal Armoured Corps.
- The Reverend Alek William Sawyer, MC, TD, Chaplain to the Forces, 2nd Class (87196), Royal Army Chaplains' Department, Territorial Army.
- Lieutenant-Colonel Peter Ross Sawyer, MC, TD, (55883), The Royal Hampshire Regiment, Territorial Army.
- Lieutenant-Colonel (temporary) John Frederick Turner Scott, TD, (65588), Royal Regiment of Artillery.
- Lieutenant-Colonel Denys Marshall Smith, TD, (63307), Royal Regiment of Artillery, Territorial Army.
- Lieutenant-Colonel (Quartermaster) Percy Joseph Thomas, MBE, (101818), Royal Army Service Corps (Employed List (2X)).
- Lieutenant-Colonel Edward Alexander Trotman, TD, (90259), The Somerset Light Infantry (Prince Albert's), Territorial Army.
- Lieutenant-Colonel (Brevet Colonel) Wilfred Frank Woodall, TD, (76448), Corps of Royal Engineers, Territorial Army (now Territorial Army Reserve of Officers).
- Lieutenant-Colonel Terence Martin Pelham-Dale, ED, Commanding Officer, 1st Battalion, Federation of Malaya Volunteer Force (Reconnaissance Corps).

Royal Air Force

- Wing Commander Eric Baldwin, DSO, DFC, DFM, (47403).
- Wing Commander Andrew Dent Balmain (45923).
- Wing Commander Douglas Bower, MBE, AFC, (134060).
- Wing Commander Bernard Gordon Dickinson (31216).
- Wing Commander Edmund Donovan, DFC, (117677).
- Wing Commander Denis William Edmonds, DFC, AFC, (39435).
- Wing Commander Frank John French, DFC, AFC, (72120).
- Wing Commander David Abbott Green, DSO, DFC, (82179).
- Wing Commander Harry Graham Hastings, AFC, AFM, (36226).
- Wing Commander Alec Richard Hindley, AFC, (42837).
- Wing Commander Eric John Penton-Voak (47971).
- Wing Commander Norman Arthur Smith, MBE, (43308), (Retired).
- Acting Wing Commander Walter Morton Cookson, MBE, (199176).
- Acting Wing Commander Ernest Irving Elliott (500173), RAF Regiment.
- Acting Wing Commander Alfred George Mason (67876), RAF Volunteer Reserve (Training Branch).
- Squadron Leader Philip Edmund Lindsey-Halls (45235).
- Squadron Leader Charles Theodore Lynas (53151).
- Squadron Leader William Laurence Price (130122).
- Squadron Leader William Smith (55971).
- Squadron Leader Stanislaw Wandzilak, DFC, AFC, (500039).
- Acting Squadron Leader John Ernsting, MB, BS, (503637).

Civil Division

- Betty Fithie Calder Adams, Alderman of the County of the Borough of Berwick-upon-Tweed.
- Robert Adamson, Chief Constable, Ayrshire Constabulary.
- Geraldine May Russell Allen. For political and public services in Cheshire.
- Stanley Alty, Works Manager, Brine and Water Works, Alkali Division, Imperial Chemical Industries, Ltd.
- Alderman John Frank Amery, JP. For political and public services in Staffordshire.
- Alexander Harper Anderson, JP. For public services in Angus.
- Leslie Richard Eyre Appleton, Chief Engineer (Weapons Division), The Fairey Aviation Co. Ltd., Hayes, Middlesex.
- Colin Park Baird, JP, Chairman of Committee No. 498 (Wishaw) Squadron, Air Training Corps.
- Edward Ronald Baker, Assistant Chief Constable, Glamorgan Constabulary.
- Bertram Bartlett, Conseiller, States of Guernsey, and Jurat of the Royal Court.
- Sarah Ashbourne Baker-Beall, MBE. For public services in Bexleyheath, Kent.
- William John Bennett, Lately Member, West Sussex Agricultural Executive Committee.
- Elsie Louise Biddle, Manager, Insurance Branch, Navy, Army and Air Force Institutes.
- David Black, JP, President, St. Edmundsbury Co-operative Bacon Factory.
- James Walker Booth, Member, Board of Governors, United Leeds Hospitals.
- Norman Boothroyd, Senior Housing and Planning Inspector, Ministry of Housing and Local Government.
- Commander (S) Ronald Stewart Borner, VRD, Royal Naval Volunteer Reserve. Lately Secretary, Land Agents' Society.
- Albert William Bourner. For political services.
- Betty Evelyn Box (Mrs. P. E. Rogers), Producer (Films).
- Richard Brandon, Traffic Manager, Birmingham & Midland Motor Omnibus Co. Ltd.
- Albert George Hellyer Brend, Chairman, Society of Industrial Civil Defence Officers.
- Cecil Charles Brinton, JP. For public services in Kidderminster.
- Isaac Robert Broad, MBE, Chairman, Reading and District War Pensions Committee.
- Alderman William Brock. For public services in Hampshire.
- David Gardner Brown, Chairman, Tyneside District Advisory Committee of the Northern Regional Board for Industry.
- George Frederick Brown, Director, Cottage Laboratories, Ltd., Cobham, Surrey.
- Cyril Dan Bucknell, MBE, Chief Executive Officer, Ministry of Transport and Civil Aviation.
- Edward William Bullen, lately Assistant Official Receiver, Companies Winding-up Department, Board of Trade.
- Charles Pleydell Calley. For public services in Surbiton.
- Captain William John Canton, DL. For public services in Glamorgan.
- Edward Capstick, MC, Director, United Dairies, Ltd.
- Norman Carter, Chief Naval Architect and Technical Manager, Swan, Hunter & Wigham Richardson, Ltd., Wallsend-on-Tyne.
- Wallace John Challens, Senior Superintendent, Weapons Electronics, Atomic Weapons Research Establishment, Aldermaston.
- George Chandley, MBE, MM, General Secretary, British Limbless Ex-Service Men's Association.
- Herbert Edward Chapman, Telegraph Manager, General Post Office.
- Captain Hubert Frank Chase, Principal, King Edward VII Nautical College, London.
- William George Nobes Chew, Staff Engineer, Deputy Director of Signals (Landlines), Air Ministry.
- Sibyl Dorothy Clements, Principal, War Damage Commission and Central Land Board.
- Thomas Cochrane, Deputy Chief Information Officer, Air Ministry.
- Arnold Robert Cooper, Higher Collector, Board of Customs and Excise.
- Leslie Reginald Cox, Senior Principal Scientific Officer, British Museum (Natural History).
- Frederick Moore Craig, Principal Officer, Ministry of Commerce for Northern Ireland.
- Alderman Charlie Crowder, JP, Chairman, Rochdale Local Employment Committee and Disablement Advisory Committee.
- Jack Cyril Glass Crump, JP, Honorary Secretary, British Amateur Athletic Board.
- David Currie, JP, Chairman, Scottish Executive Committee, and National Vice-President, Clerical and Administrative Workers' Union.
- Harry William Danbury, Joint Honorary Treasurer, National Council, Young Men’s Christian Association.
- Stanley Owynne Deavin, Secretary, North Western Gas Board.
- Robert Dell, Signal Engineer, London Transport Executive.
- David Allison Dick, Grade 2 Officer, Ministry of Labour and National Service.
- Richard Lionel Vere Doake, DSO, MC, Chairman, East Ham and Kingston Local National Insurance Appeals Tribunals.
- Edward Victor Dolby, Air Mail Adviser to British European Airways Corporation and British Overseas Airways Corporation.
- William Thomas James Donovan, Telephone Manager, Long Distance Area, General Post Office.
- Victor Frederick Dorey, Principal Examiner, Patent Office, Board of Trade.
- Douglas Collins Doubleday, Director, A. Howgego Junior, Ltd., Borough Market.
- Arthur Edmund Dredge, Principal Clerk, Board of Inland Revenue.
- Elizabeth Drewry, Headmistress, Albright Girls' Secondary Modern School, Oldbury, Worcestershire.
- Roland Dudley. For services as Chairman, Humane Traps Advisory Committee.
- Lieutenant-Colonel Ernest Norman Elford, TD, Manager, Radar Division, Marconi's Wireless Telegraph Co. Ltd., Chelmsford, Essex.
- Alderman George Elliott, For political and public services in County Fermanagh.
- Thomas Entwisle, lately Chief Executive Officer, Ministry of Supply.
- Melrhodd Mary Towy-Evans, Chief Personnel. Management Adviser, Ministry of Labour and National Service.
- Obadiah Evans, JP, Alderman, Monmouthshire County Council.
- Ainslie Dutton Fairclough. For political and public services in Warrington.
- Ronald George Fall, Senior Signals Officer, Civil Aviation Telecommunications Directorate, Ministry of Transport and Civil Aviation.
- Andrew Noel Ferrier, Chief Accountant, North of Scotland Hydro-Electric Board.
- Eugene Arthur Ferriss, County Inspector, Royal Ulster Constabulary.
- Herbert Clyde Fitzer, Superintending Electrical Engineer, Admiralty, Bath.
- Percy Charles Ford, JP, Managing Director, J. J. Etridge Junior, Ltd., Roofing Contractors, London.
- Douglas Gerard Arthur Fox, lately Director of Music, Clifton College.
- William Fraser, Joint Managing Director, Transport Development Group, Ltd.
- Leslie Freeman, MBE. For political and public services in Middlesex.
- Morley Howarth Freeman, Principal Scientific Officer, Meteorological Office, Air Ministry.
- Abram Games, Graphic designer.
- John Stephen Gandee, MBE, Principal, Commonwealth Relations Office.
- William Gayton, Chief Officer, Cardiff Fire Brigade.
- Ernest Harold Getliff, General Superintendent, Royal School of Industry for the Blind, Bristol.
- Lieutenant-Colonel Alexander Ingram Mitchell Gilchrist, MBE, TD, Secretary, Territorial and Auxiliary Forces Association, County of Dumbarton.
- William Henry James Gillham, Director, Home Flax Production, Board of Trade.
- James Ford Gillies, Vice-Principal, Belfast College of Technology.
- Benjamin George Little Glasgow, County Surveyor, Tyrone County Council.
- Ernest Charles Goer, MBE, Chairman, West Midlands Regional Schools Advisory Committee.
- Grace Murrell Wyndham Goldie, Assistant Head of Talks, Television, British Broadcasting Corporation.
- George Hammond Metcalfe Graham, Chairman, Central National Health Service Chemist Contractors Committee.
- Leslie Reginald Greenaway, Superintending Civil Engineer, Admiralty.
- Alexander Harry Jules Greenblatt, Chief Executive Officer, Export Credits Guarantee Department.
- Roy Albert Frederick Hammond, Principal Scientific Officer, Armament Research and Development Establishment, Ministry of Supply.
- Ernest William Hancock, MBE, Chairman, Coventry Local Productivity Association.
- The Honourable Christopher Alers Hankey, Senior Technical Officer, Ministry of Labour and National Service.
- John Harold Hargreaves, Deputy Regional Controller, Ministry of Pensions and National Insurance.
- Arthur Charles Hatfield, Principal, Ministry of Agriculture, Fisheries and Food.
- Henry Hayhow, MBE. Lately Honorary Secretary and Treasurer, West Ham Savings Committee.
- Cyril Frank Spencer Hearn, Divisional Controller, General Post Office.
- Leonard Charles Hector, Director of Publications, Public Record Office.
- Hans Hess, Curator, City of York Art Gallery.
- Herbert Alfred Heyhoe, Senior Inspector of Taxes, Board of Inland Revenue.
- William Harold Hillier, Sewage Works Engineer and Manager, City of Bradford. For services to industrial salvage.
- Katherine Mary Hirst, MB, Senior Medical Officer, Ministry of Health.
- Stewart Hogg, Chief Examiner of Engineers, Marine Crews Division, Ministry of Transport and Civil Aviation.
- Dorothy Frances Hollingsworth, Head of Nutrition Section of Scientific Advisers Division (Food), Ministry of Agriculture, Fisheries and Food.
- Herbert Hollinrake, Land Commissioner (Farm Buildings Advisory Officer), Agricultural Land Service.
- Ronald Broughton Hopkins, Chairman, Leeds Industrial Savings Sub-Committee.
- Joseph Christopher William Horne, Assistant Keeper, First Class, Department of Printed Books, British Museum.
- James Fisher Hough. For public services in Brentwood, Essex.
- Charles Frederick Hudgell, Traffic Manager, Head Office, Cable & Wireless Ltd.
- Evan Gwilym Hughes, Grade 2 Officer, Ministry of Labour and National Service.
- Sidney Albert Hunwicks, Senior Principal Scientific Officer, Royal Aircraft Establishment, Ministry of Supply.
- James Hutcheon, Town Clerk, Royal Burgh of Dumfries.
- George Hutchinson, Assistant Regional Civil Defence Director, Northern Region, Home Office.
- John Watson Ireland, HM Inspector of Schools, Ministry of Education.
- Colonel Samuel Gilbert Isitt. For political and public services in Bedfordshire.
- David Hamilton Macintosh Jack, JP, Director, Edinburgh Royal Choral Union. President, Scottish National Orchestra dub.
- Harold Percy James, MBE, Principal, Board of Customs and Excise.
- John Alfred Jones. For political services in Somerset.
- Owen Hugh Longfield-Jones, Chief Engineer, SS Southern Cross, Shaw Savill Line.
- Robert Joseph Jorgensen, Honorary Organiser, Anglo-Danish Fund for the Treatment of Tuberculous British Children in Danish Sanatoria.
- Victor John Marshall Kendrick. For services as Civil Assistant to Senior Superintendent, Royal Ordnance Factories, Woolwich, Ministry of Supply.
- John Blythe Kinross, General Manager, Industrial and Commercial Finance Corporation.
- John Brown Kirkwood, Principal, Department of Health for Scotland.
- Wilfred Harold Krichefski, Senator, States of Jersey.
- John Charles Kydd. For services as Chairman of Wages Councils. Registrar, Selly Oak Colleges, Birmingham.
- Cyril Dunn Lawrence, Superintending Scientist, Central Dockyard Laboratory, HM Dockyard, Portsmouth.
- Dennis Leigh, Executive Registrar, Registry of Friendly Societies.
- Donald James Loney, Chief Administrative Officer, National Union of Mineworkers.
- Norman MacDonald, Principal, Air Ministry.
- George Alexander McKechanie, Liquidator of the Raw Cotton Commission.
- Donald Og Maclean, MBE, MC, Headmaster, Grieff Junior Secondary School.
- Ronald Macleod, HM Inspector of Schools (Higher Scale), Scottish Education Department.
- Reginald Artane McMahon, Secretary, British Electrical and Allied Industries Research Association.
- John Mains, Convener, Health and Welfare Committee, Glasgow Corporation.
- George Benjamin Mansell, Chairman of the Governors, Mary Hare Grammar School for the Deaf, Newbury, Berkshire.
- Harry May, Clerk, Merton and Morden Urban District Council.
- John Nelson Meredith, lately City Architect, Bristol.
- The Reverend Joseph Moffett, Minister of the Church, of Scotland, Crown Court Church, Covent Garden.
- George Hedley Monkman, Chairman, Leeds and District Local Employment Committee.
- Denis Edward Morris, Head of Midland Regional Programmes, British Broadcasting Corporation.
- Captain Roland George Mott, Master, SS British Glory, B.P. Tanker Co. Ltd.
- Frederick Arthur Munn, lately Chief Executive Officer, HM Dockyard, Malta.
- George Murray Nash, Chief Executive Officer, HM Treasury.
- Alexander George Norrie. For services to farming in Aberdeenshire.
- Joseph O'Hagan, General Secretary, National Union of Blastfurnacemen, Ore Miners, Coke Workers and Kindred Trades.
- Noel Thomas O'Reilly. For political and public services in Cumberland.
- Edward William James Osborne, MBE, BEM, Deputy Commander, No. 2 District, Metropolitan Police Force.
- Sheila Mary Prior-Palmer. For political and public services in Sussex.
- Thomas Frederick Pearcey, Assistant Controller of Supplies, Ministry of Works.
- Arnold Joseph Philip Powell, Architect.
- Captain Thomas Walter Robert, Procter, Alderman, Weston-super-Mare Borough Council, Somerset.
- John Pryor. For political and public services in Cornwall.
- Elfyn John Richards, Professor of Aeronautical Engineering, University of Southampton.
- Reginald Guy Richmond, JP, Deputy Chairman, Warwick County Agricultural Executive Committee.
- Gladys Helen Bertha Roberts, lately Secretary, Hungarian Department, British Council for Aid to Refugees.
- Harold Kilner Robin, Chief Engineer, Communications Department, Foreign Office.
- Daniel Herbert Roper, General Secretary, National Deposit Friendly Society.
- Ernest George Rowe, Chief Valve Engineer, Standard Telephones & Cables, Ltd., Sidcup, Kent.
- Brigadier John Scott, DSO. For political and public services in Worcestershire.
- Henry Seligman, Deputy Chief Scientist, Head of Isotope Division, Harwell, United Kingdom Atomic Energy Authority.
- Thomas Stevenson Sharp, Principal, Ministry of Works.
- John Beetham Shaw, JP, Principal Regional Architect, North Midland Region, Ministry of Housing and Local Government.
- Janet Sutherland Shearer. For political services in Scotland.
- Harold Shentall, JP, Chairman, Chesterfield Rural District Central Savings Committee.
- Athol Mark Buchanan Shephard, Senior Executive Officer, Ministry of Housing and Local Government.
- Harold Taplin Shergold, MBE, Principal, Foreign Office.
- William David Shillito, Headmaster, Alfred Barrow Secondary School for Boys, Barrow-in-Furness.
- Frank Sisson. For political and public services in Derbyshire.
- Wing Commander Edward Montague Smith, MBE, Chief Executive Officer, Foreign Office, Government Communications Headquarters.
- Stanley Hathaway Smith, Finance and Accounts Officer, Department of Scientific and Industrial Research.
- Thomas Roberts Snellgrove, Deputy Inspector-General of Waterguard, Board of Customs and Excise.
- Catherine Lilian Somerville, Director, Fine Arts Department, British Council.
- Tom Steers, Senior Lands Officer, War Office.
- Alderman Donald Gordon Stewart, MBE, JP. For political and public services in Croydon.
- Colonel Thomas Sutton, MBE, Chairman, National Small-Bore Rifle Association.
- William Swift, Director and Deputy General Manager, Joseph Lucas Gas Turbine Equipment, Ltd., Birmingham.
- Arthur Sykes, Technical Director, David Brown & Sons (Huddersfield), Ltd.
- Joseph Stanley Thomas, MRCS, LRCP, JP, General Medical Practitioner, East Ham.
- Laetitia Florence, Lady Lucas-Tooth, Head, One-in-Five Department, Women's Voluntary Services.
- Bernard Robert Townend, Chief Dental Officer, County Council of the West Riding of Yorkshire.
- Alec Turner. For public services in Coventry.
- Bessie Tyson, Chief Catering Adviser, HM Treasury.
- William Ernest Tyson, Chairman, Tysons (Contractors), Ltd., Lancashire.
- Eileen Bertha Wallace. For political and public services in Belfast.
- Richard Dawson Warren, Principal Officer, Ministry of Health and Local Government for Northern Ireland.
- Ronald Watton, previously Director of Technical Services of the Near East Arab Association, Ltd., Cyprus.
- Leslie Hugh Welch, Chief Engineer, London Electricity Board.
- Lieutenant-Colonel Charles Thomas Wells, TD. For services to the Anglo-Egyptian Resettlement Board.
- Thomas William Willbourne, MM, Assistant to the Master in Lunacy, Supreme Court of Judicature.
- Rice Williams, BEM, Senior Soil Chemist, National Agricultural Advisory Service.
- Thomas Leslie Williams, Senior Legal Assistant, Ministry of Pensions and National Insurance.
- Ernest William Wills, MBE, lately Chief Executive Officer, War Office.
- Harold Frederick Wilson, Senior District Inspector of Mines and Quarries, North Eastern Division, Ministry of Power.
- John Fraser Wilson, JP, DL. For political and public services in Glasgow.
- Mary Joyce Wright, President, Derbyshire Branch, British Red Cross Society.
- Allan Yeaman, MBE, JP, Chairman, Inverness-shire Local Savings Committee.
- Edward Barber, lately First Secretary (Labour) at Her Majesty's Embassy in Brussels.
- Henry John Brewster, British subject resident in Chile.
- Ralph Allen Daniell, lately First Secretary (Commercial) at Her Majesty's Embassy, Helsinki.
- Ronald Carr Drysdale, Member of the Committee of Management of the British Hospital, Buenos Aires.
- Harry Gilbert Faulkner, British subject resident in Stockholm.
- Claude Hender Henderson, MBE, lately First Secretary (Commercial) at Her Majesty's Embassy, Rome.
- Frank Hollis, British subject resident in Luanda.
- Thomas Victor Humphreys, MB, BCh, lately First Secretary and Medical Officer at Her Majesty's Embassy in Moscow.
- Thomas William Morray, MBE, British Council Representative in the Lebanon.
- Edward Cecil O'Brien, British subject resident in Madrid.
- Frank Edward O'Connor, formerly General Manager (Pipeline & Terminal), Iraq Petroleum Co. Ltd., Syria.
- Alan Herbert Selley, lately a British delegate on the Legislative Assembly, International Administration, Tangier.
- Harry Hawkes Shephard, lately Director and President of the Sociedad Comercial Anglo-Ecuatoriana Ltd.
- Walter Arthur Soundy, British subject resident in El Salvador.
- Alan Buchan Theobald, Reader in the Department of History, Khartoum University.
- Thomas James Russell Warren, MB, FRCS(Ed.), Director of the Samaritano Hospital, São Paulo.
- Frederick Thomas Amer, Town Clerk and City Treasurer, Bendigo City Council, State of Victoria.
- Truman David Barber, in recognition of his services to youth movements in the State of South Australia.
- Hugh McLean Barbour, of Salisbury, Southern Rhodesia. For philanthropic services.
- Derek William Bigley, Controller of Immigration, Federation of Malaya.
- Marie Freda Breen, President of the National Council of Women. State of Victoria.
- Arthur Cecil Butler. For services in connection with the development of civil air transport in the State of New South Wales.
- Cecil Jones Butts Worth, Under-secretary, Chief Secretary's Department, State of New South Wales.
- Maurice Sibbald Calderwood, a plantation manager in South India. For services to the United Kingdom community.
- George Carins, in recognition of his services to Local Government in the northern part of the State of Tasmania.
- Harold Crawford, MB, FRACS, an orthopaedic surgeon in Brisbane. State of Queensland.
- William Gordon Stanford Driver, Judicial Commissioner, Basutoland.
- William Herbert Green, JP. For services to Local Government in the State of Queensland.
- James Andrew Innes. For services to Local Government in the State of New South Wales.
- Reuben Jacobson, Director of Medical Services, Basutoland.
- William Harold Jenkins, Transportation Manager, Government Railways, State of New South Wales.
- Stanley Edward Jewkes, Acting Assistant Director of Public Works (Roads & Airfields), Federation of Malaya.
- Albert Montefiore Lake, MVO, a member of the staff of the Premier's Department, State of New South Wales.
- Victor Stanley van Langenberg, a Chartered Architect in Kuala Lumpur, Federation of Malaya.
- Bernard James Layers, Manager, Benta Rubber Estate, Benta, Pahang, Federation of Malaya.
- Leonard Ross Mallen, MB, BS, a medical practitioner in the Lower North District, State of South Australia.
- Eric Malcolm Mcdonald, Controller of Manpower and Chief Registration Officer, Federation of Malaya.
- John Forster Millard, MBE, Senior District Officer, Bechuanaland Protectorate.
- Edward Charles Mitty, a Councillor of the St. Kilda City Council, State of Victoria.
- Magongo Nkosi, President of the Swazi National Council, Swaziland.
- Captain Robert Henry Norman, a member of the Bush Pilots Airways, Cairns, State of Queensland.
- Major Escourt Raymond Buller Palmer, a member of the Land Settlement Board, Southern Rhodesia.
- William Henry Pearce, formerly Chairman of the District Council of Cleve, State of South Australia.
- Duncan Stormont Ramage. Secretary to the Police Department, State of Victoria.
- Captain Ernest Clifford Rhodes, MVO, Royal Australian Navy (Retired), Private Secretary to the Governor of the State of Queensland.
- Donald Andrew Rose, formerly a Director of the Co-operative Tobacco Company, Swaziland.
- Raymond Osborne Stockil, Member of Parliament for Fort Victoria, Southern Rhodesia. For public and political services.
- Edward Joseph Trait, Governing Director and Editor of Standard Newspapers, Ltd., State of Victoria.
- Robert Williams, Principal of the Teachers' Training College, Kota Bharu, Federation of Malaya.
- John Reginald Wilson. For services to the United Kingdom community in Assam, India.
- Alhaji Aliyu, Turakin Zaria, Chairman, Development Corporation, Northern Region, Nigeria.
- Frank Richard Ashton, MB, ChB. For public services in Hong Kong.
- Major John Victor Claudius Bonello, Chairman, Malta Branch, British Legion.
- John Radley Brown, Director of Produce Inspection Service, Eastern Region, Nigeria.
- Frederick Karl Butler, ED, Director of Education, Western Region, Nigeria.
- Frank Appleton Collymore. For public services in Barbados.
- Arthur Hunt-Cooke. Adviser on Teacher Training, Federation of Nigeria.
- Hans Cory, Sociologist, Provincial Administration, Tanganyika.
- Asmatullah Shamas Din. For public services in Uganda.
- Prince Edgar Ferdinand. Lately Senior Inspector of Schools, Tobago, Trinidad.
- The Reverend Canon Charles Alfred Forster. For missionary and educational service in Federation of Nigeria.
- Hugh Cullen Harding. For public services in the Falkland Islands.
- Walter Douglas Harverson, Commissioner (Mines & Geology), Kenya.
- Herbert Edward Owen Hughes, Establishment Secretary, Uganda.
- Seyfu Tamba Jammeh, MBE, Chief of the Upper Baddibu District, Gambia.
- David Andrew Kain, Deputy Financial Secretary (Finance), Mauritius.
- Keith Ties Rollock Kirkpatrick, Postmaster General, British Guiana.
- Charles William Leverett, MBE, Regional Representative, Tanganyika, East African Railways & Harbours Administration.
- Walter Desmond Lewis. For public services in Nyasaland.
- Walter Clifford Little, Deputy Director of African Education, Northern Rhodesia.
- Ronald George Lock, Deputy Chief Constable, Cyprus Police Force.
- Thomas Lockley, Acting Assistant Chief Constable (Crime), Cyprus Police Force.
- Ronald William Atkinson McColl, Overseas Audit Service, Director of Audit, Cyprus.
- Richard Anthony Malyn, Permanent Secretary, Ministry of Social Services, Uganda.
- Horace Mason, Senior Social Development Officer, Tanganyika.
- The Reverend John Rudd Metcalfe. For public services in the British Solomon Islands Protectorate.
- Captain Roger Pierre Mollard, Managing Director, Malayan Airways Ltd., Singapore.
- Bernard Harold Nealon, Senior Superintendent, Sierra Leone Police Force.
- Samuel Adedigba Oto, MBE, Member, Public Service Commission, Western Region, Nigeria.
- Pan Tsoh Chen, MB, ChB. For social welfare services in North Borneo.
- George Sulaiman Panda, Commissioner of Labour, Sierra Leone.
- Ivan Samuel Parboosingh, Senior Medical Officer, Jamaica.
- George William Portsmouth, General Manager, Inland Telecommunications Authority, Cyprus.
- Elwyn Idris Price, Registrar of Co-operative Societies, Western Region, Nigeria.
- Lieutenant-Colonel Alexander Rhind, Commanding Officer, Singapore Harbour Board Reserve.
- Granville Roberts, Public Relations Officer for Kenya in London.
- Abraham William Serfaty, JP. For public services in Gibraltar.
- John Patrick Sexton, MB, ChB, Regional Senior Health Officer, Northern Region, Nigeria.
- Frederick John Tickel Smallridge, Head of Pay Department, Office of the Crown Agents for Oversea Governments and Administrations.
- Clarence Edmund Smith, LMS, Assistant Director of Medical Services (Tuberculosis), Singapore.
- William Eric Smith, Assistant Engineer in Chief (Administrative), East Africa High Commission.
- Murugusu Sockalingam. For public services in Sarawak.
- Tay Teck Eng. For public services in Singapore.
- Harry Anderson Thom. For public services in Northern Rhodesia.
- Cyril Sykes Thompson, Director of Education, Somaliland.
- Tse Yu Chuen. For public services in Hong Kong.
- James Clifford Llewellyn Wall, JP. For public services in Montserrat, Leeward Islands.
- John Watson, District Commissioner, Sierra Leone.
- John Merryne Watson, Director of Natural Resources, Somaliland.
- Hector McDonald White, Permanent Secretary, Ministry of Trade and Industry, Jamaica.
- Sheikh Yehya bin Muhammed As Saqladi, Sheikh of Shaib, Aden Protectorate.

==== Member of the Order of the British Empire (MBE) ====
Military Division

Royal Navy

- Engineer Lieutenant Leonard Frederick Clark.
- Instructor Lieutenant-Commander Robert Bruce Hollis.
- Lieutenant-Commander Alan John Leahy, DSC.
- Engineer Lieutenant-Commander Trevor Lewis, DSM.
- Lieutenant (S.D.) George Ronald Lush.
- Lieutenant-Commander John Aylmer McClure, DSC, (Retired).
- Lieutenant (S.D.) Peter John Messervy.
- Communication Lieutenant-Commander John O'Connor, VRD, Royal Naval Volunteer (Wireless) Reserve.
- Temporary Lieutenant-Commander (Sp.) Eric Osborne Read, Royal Naval Volunteer Reserve.
- First Officer Irene Kathleen Steljes, Women's Royal Naval Service.
- Supply Lieutenant-Commander George Leonard Troke, (Retired).
- Lieutenant Philip Arthur White.
- Captain (Quartermaster) William Ernest Wood, Royal Marines.

Army

- Captain Royston Eric Acres (322447), Corps of Royal Electrical and Mechanical Engineers.
- 22267095 Warrant Officer Class II Horace Almen, The Royal Leicestershire Regiment, Territorial Army.
- 1876596 Warrant Officer Class I John William Frazer Anderson, Corps of Royal Engineers.
- Major the Honourable Mary Mackenzie Anderson (234046), Women's Royal Army Corps.
- 22297220 Warrant Officer Class II Albert Leonard Appleton, 3rd/4th County of London Yeomanry (Sharpshooters), Royal Armoured Corps, Territorial Army.
- S/889952 Warrant Officer Class I Irvin Ernest Wilton Arathoon, Royal Army Service Corps.
- Major Peter Stanhope Baines (74554), Corps of Royal Engineers.
- Major William Bisset Banister (94292), Royal Regiment of Artillery.
- Major and Paymaster Harrison Barker (378171), Royal Army Pay Corps (formerly The Seaforth Highlanders).
- Major David William Scott-Barrett, MC, (224216), Scots Guards.
- 5670230 Warrant Officer Class I Kenneth Ernest Bartlett, The Somerset Light Infantry (Prince Albert's).
- W/158389 Warrant Officer Class I Greta Baylis, Women's Royal Army Corps.
- Major (Quartermaster) Henry Thomas Beasley (161910), The Bedfordshire and Hertfordshire Regiment.
- 7691601 Warrant Officer Class I William Eustace Bennett, Corps of Royal Military Police, Territorial Army.
- Major Richard John Bishop, MC, (149941), Royal Regiment of Artillery.
- Major (acting) Charles Sydney Black (374351), Army Cadet Force.
- Major (temporary) Colin Herbert Bligh (285409), Royal Tank Regiment, Royal Armoured Corps.
- Captain (Quartermaster) Robert Arthur Bowman (426205), 16th/5th The Queen's Royal Lancers, Royal Armoured Corps.
- Major and Paymaster Robert Taylor Boyd (269803), Royal Army Pay Corps.
- Major Hugh Boyle (315175), The Royal Scots (The Royal Regiment) (Employed List (4)) (now Regular Army Reserve of Officers).
- Major Arthur Thomas Burrows, ERD, (93049), Royal Corps of Signals.
- 2325088 Warrant Officer Class II Robert James Cook, Royal Corps of Signals.
- 7010345 Warrant Officer Class I Ernest John Cox, Corps of Royal Engineers.
- Major Arthur Graham Hewitt Culverhouse, TD, (88328), The East Surrey Regiment (Employed List (3)).
- Major John Harold Greenway Deighton, MC, (180533), The Royal Northumberland Fusiliers;
- Major Charles Jack Davidson (195175), Royal Regiment of Artillery.
- S/3531450 Warrant Officer Class II Robert Davies, BEM, Royal Army Service Corps.
- Major (Quartermaster) George Charles John Dumper (130699), Royal Regiment of Artillery (now Regular Army Reserve of Officers).
- Captain Edward Cadwalader Dunn, TD, (32419), Royal Army Service Corps, Territorial Army.
- Major Edward Dyson (95104), Royal Regiment of Artillery.
- Lieutenant Aubrey Francis Raymond Evans (414325), Royal Army Service Corps.
- Major John Stanley Fielding (132987), Royal Regiment of Artillery.
- 3852356 Warrant Officer Class I (acting) Gilbert Finneran, The Argyll and Sutherland Highlanders (Princess Louise's).
- 2695495 Warrant Officer Class I Duncan Clark Gibson, Scots Guards.
- T/56049 Warrant Officer Class I William Harry Goddard, Royal Army Service Corps.
- Major George Hugh Green, MC, TD, (65717), The Seaforth Highlanders (Rossshire Buffs, the Duke of Albany's), Territorial Army.
- Major Kenneth Hall (158244), Royal Army Educational Corps.
- Major Clarence Harry Hallett, MC, (267990), Royal Armoured Corps.
- Captain (Quartermaster) Leonard Ernest Hamilton (316343), Royal Regiment of Artillery.
- Major (Quartermaster) William Eric Hamilton (301552), Corps of Royal Electrical and Mechanical Engineers.
- Major Douglas Richardson Hassell (210271), Corps of Royal Engineers.
- Major (acting) Gerald Hinchliffe (290473), Combined Cadet Force.
- Major Charles Edwin Howard (289629), General List.
- Captain Sydney Howe, TD, (125431), Royal Army Medical Corps, Territorial Army (now Territorial Army Reserve of Officers).
- Major John Oswald Hunter (287932), Royal Corps of Signals, Territorial Army.
- 840779 Warrant Officer Class I John Edgar King, Royal Army Pay Corps.
- The Reverend Raymond Ernest Kingston, MC, Chaplain to the Forces, Third Class (270589), Royal Army Chaplains' Department.
- 7886772 Warrant Officer Class I (acting) Gerald Alfred Kirby, Corps of Royal Electrical and Mechanical Engineers.
- 852663 Warrant Officer Class II Henry Lester, Royal Regiment of Artillery, Territorial Army.
- Major (Quartermaster) Dawson Lodge (266581), Royal Regiment of Artillery.
- Major (now Lieutenant-Colonel (temporary)) Manliffe Greatorex McComas (67004), Royal Regiment of Artillery.
- S/3052939 Warrant Officer Class I Harold Richard North, Royal Army Service Corps.
- Captain (Technical Instructor in Gunnery) John William Sydney Pitt (421543), Royal Regiment of Artillery.
- Major William Pether Pritchard, TD, (53449), The Dorset Regiment, Territorial Army.
- Major John Oliver Stewart Redman (53769), The Wiltshire Regiment (The Duke of Edinburgh's).
- Major (temporary) Raymond Frederick Roach (379813), Corps of Royal Electrical and Mechanical Engineers.
- 5492540 Warrant Officer Class II John Charles Ruben Russell, Royal Regiment of Artillery, Territorial Army.
- Major Grayling Frank Wilfred Sincock (203448), Corps of Royal Engineers.
- Major George Victor John Mitchell Smith (118446), Corps of Royal Engineers.
- Major (Quartermaster) Leslie James Smith (256155), The Royal Fusiliers (City of London Regiment).
- Major William Ernest Smith (99217), Royal Army Medical Corps.
- Major Arthur Charles Sugden (267344), Royal Corps of Signals.
- Major (honorary) Henry Havelock Taylor (283526), Army Cadet Force (now retired).
- Major Donald Edwards Thompson (186510), Corps of Royal Engineers.
- Captain Sydney George Bernard Thomsett (245864), Royal Pioneer Corps.
- Major (temporary) Marston Eustace Tickell, MC, (314396), Corps of Royal Engineers.
- S/57611 Warrant Officer Class I Philip Toomer, Royal Army Service Corps.
- Major (acting) Arthur James Vigus (367082), Army Cadet Force.
- T/46587 Warrant Officer Class II George Thomas Vyse, Royal Army Service Corps.
- Major Samuel Herbert Ward, TD, (98937), The King's Shropshire Light Infantry (Employed List (3)).
- Major John Riby West (95566), Royal Corps of Signals.
- Major (Quartermaster) Francis Stanley Whitehead (120550), The King's Regiment (Liverpool), seconded to Officers Training Corps (now retired).
- T/2744620 Warrant Officer Class II Arthur Herald Wilson, Royal Army Service Corps, Territorial Army.
- 22974351 Warrant Officer Class II Thomas Wilson, Corps of Royal Engineers, Territorial Army.
- Major (Assistant Inspector of Armourers) Alfred Edward Wyatt (356659), Corps of Royal Electrical and Mechanical Engineers.

Royal Air Force

- Squadron Leader Henry Brian Alty (49672).
- Squadron Leader Harold Ashman (73069).
- Squadron Leader Alec Barrell (152797).
- Squadron Leader Francis George Harley (51769).
- Squadron Leader Raymond Stanley Harries (106273).
- Squadron Leader Vernon Thomas Land (105794).
- Squadron Leader Alec James Albert Wood (50505).
- Acting Squadron Leader Leonard Sidney William Durston (58179).
- Acting Squadron Leader George Gleave (67854), RAF Volunteer Reserve (Training Branch).
- Flight Lieutenant John Arthur Cant (44174).
- Flight Lieutenant Kenneth Guy Flintoft (104366).
- Flight Lieutenant Christopher Culverwell Harvey (56060).
- Flight Lieutenant Peter Robert Hetherington (165939).
- Flight Lieutenant Harold Thomas Woodward Houghton (200572).
- Flight Lieutenant Anthony Sidney Jarvis (502996), RAF Regiment.
- Flight Lieutenant Stanley Howard Jenkins (109087).
- Flight Lieutenant Adrian Brian McGuire (2329184), RAF Regiment.
- Flight Lieutenant George Melville McNeil (503128).
- Flight Lieutenant David Henry James Martin-Jones (1826010).
- Flight Lieutenant Gerald Anthony Morgan-Smith (169049).
- Flight Lieutenant Ronald Frederick Redding (166638).
- Flight Lieutenant Leonard Alan Robertson (130231), (Retired).
- Flight Lieutenant William Maurice Shevlin (502135), RAF Regiment.
- Flight Lieutenant William Moray Cumming Skinner (59949), RAF Regiment.
- Flight Lieutenant Rickman Smyth (187185).
- Flight Lieutenant George Stringer (590801).
- Flight Lieutenant Lloyd George Tweddle (566239).
- Acting Flight Lieutenant George Robertson (205745), RAF Volunteer Reserve (Training Branch).
- Flying Officer Jesse James Tooley (365966).
- Warrant Officer Albert Samuel Beebe (518376).
- Warrant Officer Ronald Richard Bird (563039).
- Warrant Officer William Trevor Bond (361669).
- Warrant Officer John Brophy (563037).
- Warrant Officer Arthur James Garnett (355052).
- Warrant Officer Robert Hedley (506758).
- Warrant Officer George Ernest Ingram (516409).
- Warrant Officer Geoffrey Sylvester Jalland (513901).
- Warrant Officer Norman Charles Lee (565555).
- Warrant Officer Gordon Jeffery Lord (512585).
- Warrant Officer Leonard Nicholson (590979).
- Warrant Officer William Herbert Roberts (510240).
- Warrant Officer Ernest Smith (525035).
- Master Technician George Louis Squire (363706).
- Acting Warrant Officer Vere Pattison (957095).

Civil Division

- John Alexander Acraman, Chief Electrician, Central Workshops, Trent Motor Traction Co. Ltd.
- Basil Ernest Adams, Production Manager, Television, British Broadcasting Corporation.
- Harry Ainley, Senior Assessor, War Damage Commission and Central Land Board.
- John Ainsworth, Area Officer, National Assistance Board.
- James Aldous, lately Member, Estate Management, Milk and Labour Subcommittee, Yorkshire (North Riding) Agricultural Executive Committee.
- James William Algar, Grade 3 Officer, Ministry of Labour and National Service.
- Elizabeth Gordon Allan. For political and public services in Aberdeenshire.
- Stanley Edward Anderson, Senior Executive Officer, Ministry of Pensions and National Insurance.
- Harold George Andrews, Higher Executive Officer, Board of Trade.
- Harry Annis, Chief Inspector, Metropolitan-Vickers Electrical Co. Ltd., Manchester.
- Charles Appleby, Manager, Prince of Wales Colliery, Pontefract, North Eastern Division, National Coal Board.
- Alfred Edward Atkins, Inspector of Taxes, Board of Inland Revenue.
- James Baird, Senior Executive Officer, Ministry of Pensions and National Insurance.
- Marjorie Baldwin, Senior Matron, Glenfrith (Mental Deficiency) Hospital, Leicester.
- William Herbert Balls, Chairman, Great Yarmouth Boatowners' Association.
- Adam Balmer, Maintenance Engineer, Lyle & Scott, Ltd., Hawick, Roxburghshire.
- Philip James Balmer, lately Deputy Principal Officer, Ministry of Finance for Northern Ireland.
- Joseph Addison Barber, Contracts Manager, J. & H. McLaren, Ltd., Leeds.
- Elizabeth Marion Batten, Head Teacher, Celle Primary School, British Families Education Service, Germany, War Office.
- Leslie Herbert Beards, Honorary General Secretary and Treasurer, Plymouth and District Disabled Fellowship Club.
- Margery Beattie, Founder-President, St. Raphael Club, Norwich (for Handicapped Persons).
- Margot Ann Bennett, attached War Office.
- William Berry, District House Coal Officer, Manchester.
- Juie Noreen Best, Staff Officer, Headquarters, Hospitals Welfare Department, British Red Cross Society and Order of St. John.
- Sydney Bird, Actuary, Sheffield Savings Bank.
- Arthur Blackburn, JP, Councillor, Rothwell Urban District Council.
- Major Armand David Blackley, JP, Chairman, Hertford and District War Pensions Committee.
- William Gordon Blackstock, Manager and Head Stockman of Bapton Shorthorn Herds, Aberdeenshire.
- Gertrude Mary Boardman, JP. For public services in Lancashire.
- Gerald French Bodman, Advisory Officer, Grade III, National Agricultural Advisory Service.
- Albert James Bond, District Officer, HM Coastguard, Great Yarmouth, Ministry of Transport and Civil Aviation.
- William Leslie Bower, Chief Designer, James Neill & Co. (Sheffield), Ltd.
- Frank Bowler, Senior Executive Officer, Colonial Office.
- Charles Perry Bowman, Senior Executive Officer, Ministry of Works.
- Evelyn Maud Bradley, JP, Food Flying Squad Convoy Organiser, Worcestershire.
- Lieutenant-Commander (A) Jack Brandt, DFC, Royal Naval Reserve; Civilian Ferry Pilot, Royal Naval Ferry Flight, Short Brothers & Harland Ltd., Rochester, Kent.
- Herbert Charles George Brightwell, Controller, Headquarters, Forces Entertainment Service, War Office.
- Margaret Mary Brindle. For political and public services in Lancashire.
- George Nicol Broatch, Higher Executive Officer, HM Stationery Office, Edinburgh.
- Edgar Charles Brown, Technical Officer, Grade B, Office of the Receiver for the Metropolitan Police District.
- Edward Joseph Brown. For political services.
- Gilbert William Brown, Superintendent, Gwynedd Constabulary.
- Eleanor Margaret Bruce, Secretary on the staff of the British Broadcasting Corporation.
- Gordon Farquharson Bruce, Honorary Assistant Secretary, City of Glasgow Savings Committee.
- Charles William Bunker, Senior Executive Officer, Ministry of Works.
- Edward Francis Burford, Manager, Heavy Construction Department, G. A. Harvey & Co. (London), Ltd.
- Edward Burn, lately Auditor, County Courts Department, Supreme Court of Judicature.
- Cyril Montague Henry Burton, Clerical Officer, Commonwealth Relations Office.
- Frederick Burton, JP, Councillor, Hinckley Urban District Council, Leicestershire.
- Albert Edward Victor Jubilee Campion, Grade 3 Officer, Ministry of Labour and National Service.
- Thomas Miller Carter, Grade B III Officer, Government Communications Headquarters.
- Captain Harry Cater, Master, SS Lanarkshire, Clan Line Steamers, Ltd.
- James Thomas Clark, Honorary Secretary, Essex County Football Association.
- Walter Stanley Vernon Clark, Senior Executive Officer, Ministry of Education.
- Luther Clarke, Charge Nurse, Shenley (Mental) Hospital, near St. Albans.
- Colonel Reginald Graham Clarke, CMG, DSO, President, Honorary Secretary and Treasurer, Elham Valley Unit, Sea Cadet Corps.
- William Cleland, Chairman, South-East Scotland War Pensions Committee.
- William Coen, Airport Manager, Prestwick Airport, Ministry of Transport and Civil Aviation.
- Charles Alfred Coles, Purser, MV Rangitane, New Zealand Shipping Co. Ltd.
- Christopher Comely, MC, Agricultural Instructor, Gloucester County Council.
- Alfred John Gale Cook, Senior Technical Superintendent, No. 20 Maintenance Unit, Royal Air Force Aston Down.
- Alfred Cooper, Chairman, Middlesbrough, Stockton and District War Pensions Committee.
- Henry Clifford Corless, Chief Officer, Gloucester Fire Brigade.
- Raymond Frederick Craine. For political and public services in Liverpool.
- David Crawshaw, JP, Chairman, Huddersfield Youth Committee.
- Ethel May Cryer. For political and public services in Newcastle upon Tyne.
- Llewellyn William Cule, Higher Executive Officer, Welsh Board of Health.
- George Francis Cutland, Secretary to the Bailiff of Jersey.
- Violet Annie Davidge, Senior Executive Officer, Ministry of Supply.
- Ada Davies, JP. For public services in County Durham.
- Mabel Selina Davis, Headmistress, Singlegate County Infants School, Surrey.
- Gertrude Helen Dean, Ward Sister, Leavesden (Mental Deficiency) Hospital, Watford.
- Lily Dean. For political and public services in Accrington.
- Edward Thornton Denton, JP, Member of Committee and Honorary Treasurer, the Forces Help Society and Lord Roberts Workshops, City of Liverpool Branch.
- Eva Rose Drinkill, Clerical Officer, Foreign Office.
- Ann Florence May Driver (Mrs. Trevor Blakemore). For services to the musical education of children.
- Stanley George Duffell, Senior Executive Officer, Ministry of Agriculture, Fisheries and Food.
- Harold Percival Dunstan, Higher Executive Officer, Ministry of Education.
- Arthur Herbert Dutton, Higher Executive Officer, Ministry of Defence.
- Blanche Rita Dyke, JP, Councillor, Fareham Urban District Council, Hampshire.
- Edwin Albert Eden, Secretary, Birmingham County Football Association.
- Johnston Edwards, Head Forester to the Manchester Corporation at Thirlmere, Haweswater and Longdendale.
- Joseph Ellis, JP, Superintendent, North Staffordshire Deaf and Dumb Society.
- Albert Henry England, Assistant Principal Clerk, Board of Inland Revenue.
- Fraser Mackie Evans, Chief Diesel Designer, C.A.V. Ltd., Acton.
- John Llewellyn Evans, JP, Councillor, Carmarthenshire County Council.
- Henry Edward Fairbank, Honorary Secretary, Lewisham Savings Committee.
- Samuel John Farrant, Member, Bullingdon District Committee, Oxford Agricultural Executive Committee.
- Owen Nelson Fasey, Senior Executive Officer, Board of Trade.
- John Willam Robert Penning, Higher Executive Officer, General Post Office.
- Alexander John Archibald Fergusson, JP. For political and public services in Glasgow.
- Emma Field, Organising Secretary, Alexandra Musical Society and Secretary, Disabled Men's Handicrafts, Ltd.
- Francis George Fisher, Senior Mathematics Master, Llangefhi County Secondary School, Anglesey.
- Edward Musgrove Fleming, JP, Councillor, Felling Urban District Council, County Durham.
- Eric Fletcher, Senior Accounts Assistant, British Transport Commission.
- Thomas Douglas Fookes, Civil Aviation Communications Officer, Grade I, Air Traffic Control Centre, Uxbridge, Ministry of Transport and Civil Aviation.
- Alderman Henry Walter Fox, lately Chairman, Mitford and Launditch District Committee, Norfolk Agricultural Executive Committee.
- Edward John Frost, Senior Executive Officer, Board of Trade.
- George Hubert Froude. For public services in Walton-on-Thames and Weybridge.
- Alfred George Gabriel, Associate, British Museum (Natural History).
- Margaret Ellen Galloway. For political services in the Hartlepools.
- Johra Christie Garnes, Senior Assistant Engineer, South of Scotland Electricity Board.
- David Sinclair Garson, Admiralty Pilot and Piermaster, Invergordon.
- Samuel Robinson Gawthrop, Vice-Chairman, North Lancashire County Committee, British Legion.
- John Wright Gibbs, Senior Accident Investigator, British European Airways Corporation.
- Kathleen May Goodman, Junior Civil Assistant, Office of the Financial Adviser, Headquarters, Middle East Air Force.
- Margaret Joan Goodwin, Superintendent of Typists, Cabinet Office.
- Captain John Gordon, Master, Pilot Vessel Brook, Corporation of Trinity House.
- George Patterson Graham, Principal Clerk to the Auditor of the Court of Session.
- Frank Green, Assistant Chief Constable, Kingston-upon-Hull City Police.
- Helen Edith Green. For political and public services in the West Riding of Yorkshire.
- William Green, Higher Executive Officer, Air Ministry.
- William Henry Green, Inspector of Taxes, Board of Inland Revenue.
- Lester Eley Gregory, BEM, lately Technical Officer, Grade B, Ordnance Survey Department, Southampton.
- Violet Fanny Gresham, JP. For public and charitable services in Torquay.
- David Parry Griffiths, Headmaster, Uphall County Primary School, Ilford.
- John Henry Grimster, Assistant Naval Store Officer, Newcastle upon Tyne, Admiralty.
- Squadron Leader Arthur Gordon Hall, AFC, Higher Executive Officer, Civil Aviation Divisional Office, Southern Division, Ministry of Transport and Civil Aviation.
- Florence Hall, Senior Mistress, Barnoldswick County Secondary School, Lancashire.
- Frederick Reuben Hall, Chief Officer, Barnsley Fire Brigade.
- Olive Elizabeth Hallett, Confidential Clerk, Criminal Investigation Department, Birmingham City Police.
- Eileen Violet Handlen, Librarian to the Scottish Departments, St. Andrew's House, Edinburgh.
- William Ralph Hanson, Senior Experimental Officer, Meteorological Office, Air Ministry.
- Gladys Mary Hardy. For services to the Girls' Life Brigade.
- Thomas James Hardy, Senior Executive Officer, Air Ministry.
- Whateley Hardy, Electrical Engineer, Admiralty Gunnery Equipment Depot, Coventry.
- Robert Harkness, Deputy Principal Officer, Ministry of Labour and National Insurance for Northern Ireland.
- Bella Harris, JP, Chairman, Bootle Savings Committee.
- Ernest Alfred Harris, Civil Defence Officer, Southend-on-Sea.
- Fredrick Charles Harris, Senior Executive Officer, Board of Inland Revenue.
- Harold Harrison, Assistant Commissioner, St. John Ambulance Brigade, South West Area, West Riding of Yorkshire.
- Harry Harrison, Regional Collector of Taxes, Board of Inland Revenue.
- Charles Frederick Beauchamp Harvey, Clerical Officer, Foreign Office (lately Queen's Foreign Service Messenger).
- Frederick William Victor Harvey, lately Senior Executive Officer, War Office.
- Helen Rose Harvey, lately Ward Sister, Standish Chest Hospital, Stonehouse, Gloucestershire.
- Stanley Frederick Hathaway, Senior Experimental Officer, National Physical Laboratory, Department of Scientific and Industrial Research.
- Commander Robert Stanley Hawker, RD, Royal Naval Reserve (Retired), Principal of RoSPA House, The Royal Society for the Prevention of Accidents.
- George Henry Head, DCM, Head Dyer, The Carpet Manufacturing Co. Ltd., Kidderminster.
- Joseph Western Heath, Chief Draughtsman, Admiralty.
- Robert Kerr Henderson, JP, Chairman, Edinburgh District Advisory Committee of the Scottish Board for Industry.
- Charles Battersby Hill, Executive Officer, Government Communications Headquarters.
- William Thomas Hird, Distribution Engineer and Planning Officer (Distribution), Wales Gas Board.
- Ethel Margaret Hirst, Tutor, Matrons Training Courses, National Old People's Welfare Council.
- Captain Robert William Hodge, TD, MM, Administrative Officer, Regimental Headquarters, The Dorset Regiment.
- Ida Hodges, lately Superintendent of Typists, Admiralty.
- George Ewart Holden, Senior Executive Officer, Foreign Office.
- Geoffrey Hollingsworth, Assistant Manager, Steel Production, Arthur Balfour & Co. Ltd., Sheffield.
- Joan Rosamond Howard, Executive Officer, Foreign Office.
- George Conlan Howarth, Supervising Examiner (Driving Tests), East Midland Traffic Area, Nottingham, Ministry of Transport and Civil Aviation.
- Thomas Hughes, Chemist II, Royal Ordnance Factory, Pembrey, Ministry of Supply.
- Violet Elizabeth Hughes, Honorary Secretary, Vaynor and Penderyn Savings Committee, Glamorgan.
- William Charles David Hull, Non-Technical Class Grade I, Royal Ordnance Factory, Bishopton, Ministry of Supply.
- Charles Arthur Hunter, Honorary Secretary and Treasurer, No. 153 (Slough) Squadron, Air Training Corps.
- Alexander Logan Hutchison, Higher Executive Officer, Ministry of Power.
- Archibald Jackson, Regional Secretary (Northern Ireland), National Federation of Building Trades Operatives.
- Charles Jamieson, Organiser, Scottish Farm Servants' Section, Transport and General Workers' Union.
- Margaret Glasgow Jamieson, Director, Church of Scotland Committee on Hut and Canteen Work, British Army of the Rhine.
- John Alan Jaye, Adjutant, Ulster Special Constabulary.
- John David Finemore Johnson, Senior Executive Officer, Ministry of Pensions and National Insurance.
- Captain Albert Jones, JP, Chairman, Grays Local Employment Committee, Essex.
- Doris Harriett Judd, Executive Officer, Home Office.
- Margaret Mary Kelly, JP, County Borough Organiser, Bootle, Women's Voluntary Services.
- Edward Hamilton Ker, Assistant to the Motive Power Superintendent, Eastern Region, British Railways.
- Harry King. For political services in Luton.
- James Kirkland. For political services in Kincardineshire.
- Florence Catherine Leary, Higher Executive Officer, Air Ministry.
- Gladys Edith Sarah Leaver, Senior Executive Officer, London Telecommunications Region, General Post Office.
- Frederick John Lee, Deputy Victualling Store Officer, RFA Fort Beauharnois, Admiralty.
- Joseph Lees. For political services in Stockport.
- John Alexander Leith, Engineer-in-Charge, Westerglen Transmitting Station, British Broadcasting Corporation.
- John Kenneth Lightfoot, Works Superintendent, The English Electric Co. Ltd., Stafford.
- Edgar Louis Lismer, Assistant Postmaster, Rugby, Warwickshire.
- Harold Lloyd, Assistant Chief Engineer, Yorkshire Electricity Board.
- Arnold Lord, Steward, HM Prison Holloway.
- John Edgar Love, Clerical Officer, Ministry of Pensions and National Insurance.
- Vernon Edward Luff, Secretary, States Committees, Guernsey.
- Charles Coulson Lund. For political services in York.
- Alfred Joseph Isaac Lyons, JP. For political and public services in London.
- Donald John McAllister, Senior Technical Officer, Britannia Fleet, British Overseas Airways Corporation.
- John McAllister, Staff Officer, Ministry of Commerce for Northern Ireland.
- Thomas Cox McClymont, Secretary, Scottish Schools' National Football Association.
- Margaret McGarvey. For public services, in Londonderry.
- Hubert James McHugh, Higher Clerical Officer, Ministry of Defence.
- Isabella Gordon McInroy, Principal Sister Tutor, Glasgow Royal Infirmary.
- Mary Louise McLintic. For political and public services in Enfield.
- Major William Thomson McQuillen, Senior Lecturer, Science Department, Royal Military Academy, Sandhurst.
- Sarah Maddox, lately Assistant Mistress, Knockin Church of England School, Shropshire.
- Albert John Malyon, Higher Executive Officer, Ministry of Supply.
- Ellen Mary Marks, Typist, Office of the National Insurance Commissioner.
- Harold Lewis Marsden, Grade 3 Officer, Ministry of Labour and National Service.
- George Leslie Marshall, Higher Executive Officer, Ministry of Housing and Local Government.
- Sam Bardsley Marsland, Executive Officer, Ministry of Health.
- Isabel Phyllis Joyce Maskell, Regional Clothing Officer, Reading, Women's Voluntary Services. For services to refugees.
- Dorothy Gladys Mason. For political and public services in Chesterfield.
- John Willie Mate, Vice-chairman, Sheffield Savings Committee.
- John Mather, Workshop Manager, Atomic Weapons Research Establishment, Aldermaston, United Kingdom Atomic Energy Authority.
- Ronald Cavill Mathias, Regional Secretary, South Wales Transport and General Workers' Union.
- David Locke Maxwell, Chief Youth Employment Officer, County of Lancashire.
- John Lansbury Merchant, Commercial Manager, Second Grade, Western Telegraph Co. Ltd., Brazil.
- Gordon Montague Merrifield, AFC, Flight Captain, Scottish Airlines (Prestwick), Ltd.
- Isobel Purdam Millar, Senior Survey Clerk, Marine Survey Office, Newcastle, Ministry of Transport and Civil Aviation.
- Margaret Ann Milward Miller, JP, Member representing North Nottinghamshire, National Savings Assembly.
- James Henry Mingay, Higher Executive Officer, Board of Customs and Excise.
- William Hanson Minnitt, Mechanical and Electrical Engineer, Air Ministry.
- Gordon Cecil Morley, lately Grade 4 Officer, Ministry of Labour and National Service.
- Dorothy Frances Hemming Munro, District Organiser, North Eastern District of Scotland, Women's Voluntary Services.
- Malcolm Murchison, Housing Executive Officer, Edinburgh Corporation.
- William John Muston, Higher Executive Officer, Colonial Office.
- Stephen Richmond Neate, Chairman, Hungerford Savings Committee.
- Ernest Leslie Newport, Manager, Development Fitting Shop, Bristol Aero-Engines, Ltd., Filton.
- George Newrick, Engineer III, Royal Ordnance Factory, Blackburn, Ministry of Supply.
- Edward Forster Nixon, Superintendent, Cumberland and Westmorland Constabulary.
- Albert O'Carroll, Senior Executive Officer, Ministry of Pensions and National Insurance.
- Kenneth Augustus Osbourn, Director and Administrator, Midland Federation of Building Trades Employers.
- William Roberts Owen, Grade 3 Officer, Ministry of Labour and National Service.
- Arthur George Palmer, Engineer, North Thames Gas Board.
- Alexander Brown Paterson, Director, Byre Theatre, St. Andrews.
- Jessie Sinclair Pearson, lately Senior Women Probation Officer, Glasgow.
- Frederick Charles Perkins. For political services.
- John Andrew Perkins, Chief Officer, Southport Fire Brigade.
- George McGregor Perry, Assistant Manager, Electrical Department, Harland & Wolff, Ltd., Belfast.
- John Alexander Philpott, Chief Accountant, Port of Bristol Authority.
- James Craig Picken, Honorary Secretary, Northern Ireland Cricket Union.
- Francis John Pickett, Barristers' Clerk.
- Captain Reginald Richard Pitman, DSC, Master, SS St. David, British Transport Commission.
- Richard Charles Plow, Senior Inspector, Enforcement Division, Ministry of Agriculture, Fisheries and Food.
- Charles James Pople, Chief Clerk, Territorial and Auxiliary Forces Association, County of Dorset.
- Frank Port, Chairman, Rhyl Savings Committee, North Wales.
- Sheila Brougham Portch, Passenger Relations Officer, British Overseas Airways Corporation.
- Edward Stephen Pritchard. For political and public services in the Isle of Ely.
- Joan Mary Quennell. For political and public services in West Sussex.
- Donald Wilson Rae, 1st Radio Officer and Purser, SS Pyrrhus, Alfred Holt & Co., Liverpool.
- Eleanor Irene Redgrave, Voluntary Worker, Church Army, HM Forces Welfare Department, British Army of the Rhine.
- Mary Ann Redwood, Health Visitor, Monmouthshire County Council.
- Kate Olwen Rees, JP. Member, Dolgelley Urban District Council, Merionethshire.
- James McHardy Reid, Head Forester, Scotland, Forestry Commission.
- Frederick Reynolds, lately Executive Officer, British Museum.
- Frederick Leslie Richardson, Chief Assistant Valuer, Rating of Government Property Department.
- Doreen Valentine Riddick, Secretary, National Birthday Trust Fund for the Extension of Maternity Services.
- Annabella Ritchie. For services to the education of severely handicapped children in Aberdeenshire.
- Alexander Wyllie Robbins, General Secretary, Bespoke Tailors Guild.
- Leslie Wilfred Roberts, Sea Transport Officer, Cyprus, Ministry of Transport and Civil Aviation.
- William Roberts, JP, Secretary, Bolton and District Card and Ring Room Operatives Provincial Association.
- Charlotte Rachel Ogilvie Robertson. For political and public services in Glasgow.
- Cyril Robertson, Personal Assistant to the Commander, British Joint Services Mission, Washington.
- Murdoch MacKay Rose, Head Postmaster, Queensgate, Inverness.
- Norah Mary Ann Wallace Ross, lately Senior Executive Officer, Scottish Home Department.
- Donald James Rouse, Senior Executive Officer, Patent Office, Board of Trade.
- Agnes Baird Rowan, Clerical Officer, Central Office of Information.
- James Rutherford, Foundry Manager, Wm. Beardmore & Co. Ltd., Glasgow.
- Tom Ryan, Divisional Fatstock Officer, Ministry of Agriculture, Fisheries and Food.
- William Albert Ryan. For public services in Belfast and County Down. Past pupil Drogheda Grammar School.
- Albert Edward Rymill, Higher Executive Officer, Air Ministry.
- Captain Edward Thomas Steadman Salmon, General Secretary, Civil Service Motoring Association.
- Harold Scargill, Area Officer, Hull, British Council.
- Joan Dorothy Scott. For political and public services in East Flintshire.
- Arthur Robert Geary Sentance, Regional Technical Officer (East and South East Provinces), Ministry of Agriculture, Fisheries and Food.
- Leonard Sharp, JP, Chairman, Huddersfield and Halifax District Committee of the East and West Ridings Regional Board for Industry.
- Leonard Wilfrid Sharp, Assistant Engineer, Telephone Manager's Office, Reading, General Post Office.
- Norah Sheard. For political and public services in the West Riding of Yorkshire.
- Thomas William Shields, Superintendent, Fitting and Assembly Shops, Baker Perkins, Ltd., Peterborough.
- Kathleen Mary Shirlaw, Assistant, Overseas Programme Planning, British Broadcasting Corporation.
- Nathan John Silveston, Assistant Warship Production Superintendent, Southern Area, Admiralty.
- John Sinclair, JP, Provost of Thurso.
- Isabella Minto Slade, Information Officer, British Iron and Steel Research Association.
- Peter Clive Armstrong Smalley, East African Regional Finance Officer, Colonial Development Corporation.
- Frederick Smith, Chief Superintendent, Metropolitan Police.
- Frederick William Smith, Superintendent, Boiler Shop, J. I. Thorneycroft & Co. Ltd., Southampton.
- George Archibald Smith, Assistant Quantity Surveyor, War Office.
- Laurence Smith, lately Higher Executive Officer, HM Exchequer Office, Edinburgh.
- Raymond Smith, Divisional Officer, Surrey Fire Brigade.
- William Mitchell Smith. For political services.
- Albert Victor Smyth, District Inspector, Royal Ulster Constabulary.
- Leslie Arthur Somes, Honorary Treasurer, "The Not Forgotten" Association.
- Arthur Thomas South, Councillor, Macclesfield Rural District Council.
- Frank Alaric Soward, Works Engineer, E. N. Mason & Sons, Ltd., Colchester.
- Ernest Russell Spurr, High Secretary, Independent Order of Rechabites, Salford Unity Friendly Society.
- Cyril Fells Stagey, lately Senior Experimental Officer, Ministry of Supply.
- Lucy Harriett Stapleton. For public services in Brixham, Devonshire.
- Constance May Stebbing, Voluntary Worker, Anglo-Egyptian Resettlement Board.
- Alderman James Wilfred Sterland, JP, District Secretary (Yorkshire and North Derbyshire), National Union of General and Municipal Workers.
- Phyllis May Stevens, Supervisor, Bradford Occupation Centre for Mental Defectives.
- Captain Herbert Stewart, Captain Superintendent, School of Navigation, Southampton.
- Frederick Thomas Stubbington, Civil Defence Officer, Halifax.
- William Robertson Sutherland, Chief Draughtsman, Parsons Marine Engineering Turbine Research and Development Association, Pametrada Research Station, Wallsend, Northumberland.
- Victor Emanuel Swindells, Works Manager, Thermega, Ltd. (Industrial Centre, Ex-Services Welfare Society).
- Gordon Arnold Swinney, Assistant Civil Defence Officer, Liverpool.
- Daniel Herbert Tate, Senior Vice-President and Chairman of the Executive Committee, United Kingdom Pilots' Association.
- Emily Marguerite Taylor, lately Non-Medical Supervisor of Midwives, West Riding of Yorkshire County Council.
- George Edward Taylor, Senior Executive Officer, Ministry of Pensions and National Insurance.
- Henry Taylor, Chief Control Officer, Board of Customs and Excise.
- James Alfred Taylor, Honorary Secretary, Shropshire Branch, Grenadier Guards Comrades Association.
- Norah Dorothy Taylor, Supervising Clerk, Office of United Kingdom Trade Commissioner, Durban.
- Major Thomas Richard Taylor. For public services in Londonderry, Headmaster, Christ Church School, Londonderry.
- David Henry Thomas, lately Clerk and Chief Financial Officer, Ross and Whitchurch Rural District Council, Herefordshire.
- Edgar Wynne Thomas. For services to Music in Llanelly and district.
- Henry Herbert Thomas, County Chief Warden, Civil Defence Corps, Huntingdonshire.
- Robert Stearn Thomas, Assistant County Commissioner, Hertfordshire, and International Secretary, Boy Scouts Organisation.
- William Douglas Thomas, Senior Executive Officer, Office of HM Procurator General and Treasury Solicitor.
- William Morgan Thomas, Inspector of Mines, North Western Division, Ministry of Power.
- Edith Jessie Thompson. For political and public services in Burton-on-Trent.
- Florence Jane Thompson. For political and public services in Sutton and Cheam.
- Alderman David Thorogood, Chairman, West Ham Local Employment Committee.
- Joseph Edward Thwaites, lately Senior Executive Engineer, General Post Office.
- Charles Stephen Titman, Senior Architectural Assistant, Ministry of Works.
- Reginald Charles Tomley, Senior Executive Officer, Board of Trade.
- Jackson Tomlinson, General Secretary, National Federation of Fish Friers.
- Ebenezer Tong, JP. For public services in Ashford, Kent.
- Benjamin Trewhitt, Shipyard Manager, William Doxford & Sons (Shipbuilders), Ltd., Sunderland.
- Albert Truman. For political and public services in Pontypool.
- Henry Wilfred Twatts, lately Higher Executive Officer, Board of Customs and Excise.
- Henry Chambers Vickers, Headmaster, Craiglockhart Primary School, Edinburgh.
- Bryan Ernest Wallis, Export Manager, Incorporated Federated Associations of Boot and Shoe Manufacturers of Great Britain and Ireland.
- John Henry Wand, Yard Master, Scottish Region, British Railways.
- Margaret Wyndham Ward, County Organiser, East Kent, Women's Voluntary Services.
- Frederick William Warman, Higher Executive Officer, Ministry of Pensions and National Insurance.
- Horace Waterhouse, JP, Councillor, Holywell Urban District Council.
- Kenneth Hamilton Watkins, Chairman, Hamilton Star Co. Ltd.
- James Watt, Divisional Officer (Grade III), Glasgow Fire Brigade.
- Sidney Harry Wear, Alderman, lately Member Somerset Agricultural Executive Committee.
- Andrew Marr Wedderburn, JP. For public services in County Antrim.
- Daisy Elizabeth Lovesay West. For political and public services in Kent.
- Stanley Edgar Westwood, Grade 4 Officer, Ministry of Labour and National Service.
- John Oswald Cook Whelans, Production Engineer, Valve Making Department, Milliard Radio Valve Co. Ltd., Mitcham, Surrey.
- Alice Harriett Whichelow, Assistant Secretary, Public Works and Municipal Services Congress and Exhibition Council.
- Cecilia Whittingham. For political services in Putney.
- Harold Bertram Wiggins, Higher Executive Officer, Risley, United Kingdom Atomic Energy Authority.
- Olive Mary Wilkinson, Lady Superintendent Ashton House Hospital, Birkenhead.
- Clement Hilton Williams. For public services in Sonning, Berkshire.
- Gwilym Kenneth Williams. For political and public services in Wembley.
- William Follwyn Williams, Member, Anglesey Agricultural Executive Committee.
- Frederick William Willson, Supervisor, Headquarters Post Room, Navy, Army, and Air Force Institutes.
- William Chapman Wilson, Secretary, The County Fermanagh Fanning Society, Northern Ireland.
- Hubert Charles Winwood, Surveyor and Supervisor of Hostels, British Sailors' Society.
- Daniel Joseph Wood, Birmingham District Organiser, Amalgamated Union of Building Trade Workers.
- Claud Cranmer Woods, Senior Executive Officer, Land Registry.
- Norah May Woolger, Senior Executive Officer, Ministry of Transport and Civil Aviation.
- Archibald Duncan Wright, Honorary Treasurer, Paisley and District Association for Mental Welfare and Scottish Association for Mental Health.
- Bridget Wright, JP. For political and public services in the East Riding of Yorkshire.
- Constance Marguerita Wright, Honorary Divisional Secretary, Soldiers', Sailors' and Airmen's Families Association.
- Frederick Charles Wright, Assistant Engineer, Telephone Manager's Office, Liverpool, General Post Office.
- William Wright, JP, Deputy Chairman, County Down Savings Committee.
- Frederick Denis Wrightson, Higher Executive Officer, Ministry of Agriculture, Fisheries and Food.
- Donald Verney Young, Civil Defence Controller, Birmingham Small Arms Co. Ltd.
- Major James Bernard Youngs, Chairman, J. Youngs & Son, Ltd., Building Contractors, Norwich.
- George Francis Nicholas Anderson, MB, BCh, Senior Medical Officer with the Iraq Petroleum Company in Qatar.
- William Barnard Atkins, Sub-Manager of the Westminster Foreign Bank at Marseilles.
- Henry James Bateson, British Vice-Consul at Fray Bentos, Uruguay.
- Spiros John Buhayar, British subject resident in Greece.
- Cecil John Burgess, Her Majesty's Vice-Consul at Mosul.
- Captain Michael Thomas Joseph Cooper, British Pro-Consul at Muscat.
- George William Coster, Joint Manager of the Phoenix Assurance Company in Cuba.
- Charles Gordon Goldie, Proprietor and Head of the British Institute, Rome.
- Norah Bannerman Raby de Grimsditch, Teacher of English at the School of Education, University of Conception, Chile.
- John Laurence Henderson, lately British Postmaster in Tangier.
- John Isherwood, Her Majesty's Consul at Fez.
- Ruth Margaret Jennings, British subject resident in Portugal.
- Rose Gertrude Kay, Personnel Officer, Administration Department, Her Majesty's Embassy, Washington.
- William Charles Leech, Grade II Officer, Commercial Department of Her Majesty's Embassy, Buenos Aires.
- Frank Stanislaus le Merle, lately Medical Practitioner at Basra.
- Jonathan Campbell Longbotham, Assistant in Commercial Department at Her Majesty's Embassy, Stockholm.
- James McCreadie, lately Accountant at Her Majesty's Embassy, Santiago.
- Isabella Dorothy Newhouse, Shorthand-Typist Office of the Commissioner-General for the United Kingdom in South-East Asia, Singapore.
- Percy William James Newing, Temporary Senior Executive Officer at Her Majesty's Embassy in Bonn.
- Winifred Mary Old, Clerk in the Office of the Commissioner-General for the United Kingdom in South-East Asia, Singapore.
- Edith Rose Petty, British subject resident in Brazil.
- Helen Mary Boswell Rushall, Honorary Treasurer of the National Council of Women in Burma.
- David Steel, lately Communications Officer at Phnom Penh.
- Maude Taylor, Schoolteacher resident in Sucre, Bolivia.
- Winifred May Towers, Librarian, Her Majesty's Embassy, Paris.
- Thomas John Trout, Her Majesty's Consul at Stuttgart.
- Keith Fenwick Clennell Watson, Archivist at Her Majesty's Embassy in Rio de Janeiro
- Alice Minnie Louise Austin, Secretary of the British Dominions Emigration Society.
- Harold Garfield Behan, President of the Local Government Association, State of Queensland.
- Lucy Maria Cassidy, of Sydney, State of New South Wales. For services in connection with public and literary movements.
- Lilias Adam Christie, Manageress of Wengers Residential Flats, United Kingdom High Commission, New Delhi, India.
- Leonora Elizabeth Anne Copley. For voluntary services rendered under the auspices of the Air Force Association in the State of South Australia.
- Edgar Marsh Derrick, a member of the Executive Committee, Council of Social Service, State of Victoria.
- Alfred Arthur Stanley Dobbie, JP, Manager, Jabor Valley Rubber Estate, Kuantan, Pahang, Federation of Malaya.
- Clarice Katrina Marguerite Eberhard, of Launceston, State of Tasmania. For social welfare services.
- Ruby Foster. For social welfare services in Gippsland, State of Victoria.
- Henrietta Greville. For social welfare services in the State of New South Wales.
- Arthur William Hayes, Airport Manager, Kuala Lumpur, Federation of Malaya.
- Ellen Margeurite Hayfield, formerly in charge of the Registry, Division of Justice, Internal Affairs and Housing, Southern Rhodesia.
- Margaret Mary Heath, Commissioner for the Girl Guide Association in the Federation of Malaya.
- Johannes Hendrick Hofmeyer. For public services in the Belingwe district, Southern Rhodesia.
- Lily Malcolm Hurst. For services to the Nursing profession in the State of South Australia.
- Robert Jamieson, President of the Mortlake District Hospital, State of Victoria.
- Tom King. For services to the United Kingdom community in Calcutta, India.
- Frances Vida Lahey. For services to Art in the State of Queensland.
- David Christie Lornie, MM, Secretary, British Soldiers' and Sailors' Institute, Colombo, Ceylon, 1944–1957.
- The Reverend Edward Motsamai, a Minister of the Paris Evangelical Missionary Society in Basutoland.
- Chief Kelebone Nkuebe, Senior Member of Native Authority, Basutoland.
- Zoe Mary Powell. For services to the United Kingdom community in Kampur, United Provinces, India.
- Alexander Elmore Poynton, General Secretary, Public Service Association, State of Victoria.
- Louisa Ann Sarah Pritchard, of Walgett, State of New South Wales. For social welfare services.
- Albert Rees. For services to ex-servicemen in the State of Queensland.
- Olive Hope Robertson, MB, ChB, President of the Federation of Women's Institutes of Southern Rhodesia.
- The Reverend Matthew Jacha Rusike, in recognition of his service as a teacher and superintendent to the Methodist Mission in Southern Rhodesia.
- Dudley Pearce Schubert, Secretary, Teachers' Union, State of Victoria.
- Mary Justinian Scollen (Sister Justinian), Mater Misericordiae Hospital, Sydney, State of New South Wales. For services to Nursing.
- Lilian Amy Hinchliffe Sewell, formerly a Private Secretary at Government House, Brisbane, State of Queensland.
- Reuben Sikota Sibande, African Liaison Officer, Swaziland.
- William Henry Simpson. For services rendered under the auspices of the Young Farmers Clubs Association, State of Victoria.
- David Dewar Beaton Smith, Manager, Grindlays Bank Ltd., Quetta, Pakistan. For services to the United Kingdom community.
- The Right Reverend Monsignor Owen Beevor Steele, MC. For services to ex-servicemen in the State of Queensland.
- Gerald Edward Stephens, Provincial Commissioner for Boy Scouts, Matabeleland, Southern Rhodesia.
- Stanley Symons, District Superintendent, St. John Ambulance Brigade, State of South Australia.
- Daniel Alfred Thompson, lately Senior Superintendent of Prisons, Federation of Malaya.
- Alice Jessie Tippett, JP, a Special Magistrate attached to the Children's Court, Hobart, State of Tasmania.
- Lieutenant-Commander John Edwin Tucker, MVO, VRD, Royal Australian Naval Reserve, Aide-de-Camp to the Governor of the State of Queensland.
- Evelyn Maude West. For services in connection with charitable and other social welfare organisations in the Traralgon District, State of Victoria.
- Frank Bentley Womersley, Shire Secretary, Swan Hill, State of Victoria.
- Andrew Wright, a Trader at Nokanengi Ngamiland, Bechuanaland Protectorate.
- Sheikh Muhammed Abdulqadir ba Matraf, Deputy State Secretary to the Qu'aiti Government, Eastern Aden Protectorate.
- Gabriel Adeniyi Ademiluyi, Administrative Assistant, Grade II, Medical Department, Western Region, Nigeria.
- Bamgboye Fasina Adesola, JP. For public services in the Eastern Region, Nigeria.
- Barkat Ali, Surveyor, East Africa High Commission.
- Josiah Erhabor Amadasu, Administrative Assistant, Grade II. Western Region, Nigeria.
- Valentine Dennis Archer, JP. For public services in St. Vincent, Windward Islands.
- Claudius Akiyemi Asgill, Deputy Comptroller of Customs, Sierra Leone.
- Yvette Auber, Nursing Sister to Sierra Leone Development Company.
- Fadhil Abdulla Aulaqi, Assistant Commandant, Government Guards, Aden.
- Elizabeth Abimbola Awoliyi, MRCP (Irel.), Lady Medical Officer, Federation of Nigeria.
- Edmund Bako, President of the Island Council and President of Native Courts, Ysabel, British Solomon Islands Protectorate.
- Jack Barlow, BEM, Superintendent, Cyprus Police Force.
- Hogan Bassey. For services to sport in the Eastern Region, Nigeria.
- Charles Baty, Superintendent, Mental Hospital, Zanzibar.
- The Reverend Frank John Bedford. For services to the Boy Scout movement in Kenya.
- Louise Mary Bell, Principal Sister Tutor, School of Nursing, University College Hospital, Ibadan, Federation of Nigeria.
- Avis Shirley Joan Bennitt, Personal Secretary Grade I, Kenya.
- Douglas James Brown, Private Secretary to the Governor-General, Federation of Nigeria.
- Charles Hunt Bryden. For services to the British Empire Service League, in Nyasaland.
- Henry John Burge, Superintendent, Cyprus Police Force.
- The Reverend Mother Mona Byrne, Headmistress, St. Joseph's Primary School, Basse, Gambia.
- The Reverend Canon John Calnan, Canon of the Anglican Church in the Bahamas.
- Norman Catterall, Overseas Audit Service, Principal Auditor, Windward Islands.
- Ratanshi Jethabhai Chande. For public services in Tanganyika.
- Stanley Arthur Child, Livestock Officer, Tanganyika.
- Derby Henry Chingwaru. Lately Senior Clerk, Legal Department, Nyasaland.
- Douglas Samuel Cleak. Lately Senior Surveyor, Survey Department, Northern Rhodesia.
- Hugh Richard Clifford, Veterinary Officer, Department of Veterinary Services and Animal Industry, Uganda.
- Abraham Johannes Petrus Coetzee, MRCS, LRCP, Chief Medical Officer, Rhokana Corporation, Northern Rhodesia.
- Brigid Colquhoun, Senior Red Cross Nurse, Cyprus.
- Mother Comerford, Head of the Mater Admirabilis Training College for Female Teachers, Malta.
- Leon Marcel Cooty, Deputy Accountant General, Mauritius.
- Joan Carliell Cox, Headmistress, Gayaza Girls' School, Uganda.
- John Woodrow Cross, JP. For services to agriculture in Northern Rhodesia.
- Eric Leslie Dale, Mechanical Superintendent, Somaliland.
- Alhaji Abdullahi Dau, Field Officer, West African Institute for Trypanosomiasis Research, Federation of Nigeria.
- Mable Jones de Rhodes. For public services in the Federation of Nigeria.
- Esther Elizabeth Dey. For public and social welfare services in British Guiana.
- Adamjee Elahee Doomun, Auditor, Mauritius.
- Josiah Wosu Evoh. For services to the Co-operative Movement in the Eastern Region, Nigeria.
- Anthony Douglas Galton-Fenzi, District Officer, Kenya.
- Walter Benjamin Foster, Director of Music, Hong Kong Police Force.
- The Reverend Ronald Gandy, First class Priest (Roman Catholic Church), Rodriques, Mauritius.
- Hardashan Singh Grewal. For public services in Tanganyika.
- Sven Grimstvedt. Lately Labour Officer, Northern Rhodesia.
- Joan Hall. For public services in the Western Region, Nigeria.
- Henry Gibson Shadrack Harrison. For public services in Kenya.
- Stanley Leopold Hillary. Lately Secretary of the Parish Council, of Portland, Jamaica.
- Ho Cheong Chin. Lately Superintendent, Postal Services Department, Singapore.
- Irene Elizabeth Beatrice Ighodaro, MB. For social welfare services in the Western Region, Nigeria.
- Ernest Robert Inkpen, Acting Representative, British Council, Cyprus.
- Muhammadu Inuwa, Galadiman Kano, Northern Region, Nigeria.
- Chief Tom Samuel Inyang. For public services in the Eastern) Region, Nigeria.
- Captain Arthur McAuley Jones. For public services in Barbados.
- Ezechiel Joseph, Acting Office Superintendent, Office of the Council of Ministers, Singapore.
- Candiah Karthigesu, Hospital Assistant (Super Scale), Social Hygiene Branch, Ministry of Health, Singapore.
- William Weldon Kirkby, Senior Veterinary Officer, Northern Region, Nigeria.
- Sospater Kweyamba. For public services in Tanganyika.
- James Ninian Lawrence, Administrative Officer (Acting Pilgrim. Officer in Khartoum), Northern Region, Nigeria.
- Dorothy Lee, Assistant Social Welfare Officer (Youth Welfare), Hong Kong.
- Lee Tak Kwang, Chief Clerk, Singapore Improvement Trust.
- Ellen Li-Shu Pui, JP. For services to education and social welfare in Hong Kong.
- Lim Teng Kok, Pharmacist, General Hospital, Singapore.
- Gerald Ernest Lipson, Superintendent, Jamaica Police Force.
- Reginald Phelps Little, MC, MM, JP. For public services in Fiji.
- Atonda Sanusi Longe, Inspector of Works, Public Works Department, Western Region, Nigeria.
- John Fiddes Thompson Low. Lately Principal Field Officer (Agriculture), Uganda.
- George Dougan McClymont, Inspector of Works, Rural Water Supplies, Northern Region, Nigeria.
- The Reverend Hector Cameron Magalee. For public services in British Guiana.
- Ram Rakha Maini, Office Superintendent, East African Posts and Telecommunications Administration.
- Chief John Ndasakoi Maruma, Divisional Chief, Romboy Moshi and Assistant Minister, Ministry of Social Services, Tanganyika.
- Ruby Wilhelmenia Meredith, Principal, Shortwood Training College, Jamaica.
- Ivan Midderigh, Senior Engineer, Mechanical Engineering Department, Office of the Crown Agents for Oversea Governments and Administrations.
- George Bryan Mitchell, District Officer, Tanganyika.
- William George Mitchell, Master, Research Vessel, Cape St. Mary, British Guiana.
- Victor Akudo Modebe. For public and educational services in the Eastern Region, Nigeria.
- Irene Louisa Morrison, Matron, University College Hospital, Ibadan, Federation of Nigeria.
- Mary Morrison. For services to education in Jamaica.
- Latima Kamya Musoke, Medical Officer, Uganda.
- Dwarka Nath. Lately Senior Immigration Agent, British Guiana.
- Ndu Amaekpu Ndu, Secretary, Bende County Council, Eastern Region, Nigeria.
- Bernard Reginald Neehall, Secretary and Executive Officer, Central Housing and Planning Authority and Engineering Assistant, Public Health and Engineering Unit, St. Vincent, Windward Islands.
- Sydney Harrington Nurse. For public services in Barbados.
- Matthew Olakunle Oyedele, Supervising Teacher, Okitipupa Divisional Council, Western Region, Nigeria.
- Anthimos Panaretos, Agricultural Officer, Cyprus.
- Maude Ethel Perera, Public Health Matron, Singapore.
- Emanuel Adenugu Pitan, Assistant Postal Controller, Posts and Telegraphs Department, Federation of Nigeria.
- Muthu Ponnuduray, Acting Administrative Assistant, Singapore.
- John Vincent Redhead, Primary School Headteacher, Grenada, Windward Islands.
- Sophia Beryl Rees, Queen Elizabeth Overseas Nursing Service, Matron, Grade I, King George VI Hospital, Kenya.
- Mehmet Refik, Superintendent, Cyprus Police Force.
- Percy Grosvenor Roberts, Administrative Officer, Gilbert and Ellice Islands Colony.
- James Scott Robinson, MRCS, LRCP, District Medical Officer, Dominica, Windward Islands.
- Richard Otford Russell, Chief Superintendent, Cyprus Police Force.
- Sitt Nur Haider Saeed, Headmistress, Sheikh Othman Girls' Primary School, Aden.
- Muhammadu Sambo, Magajin Gari Kaduna, Assistant Administrator, Kaduna, Northern Region, Nigeria.
- Victor Fitzgerald Scott, Head Teacher, Central School, Bermuda.
- Charan Das Sharma, Office Assistant (Printing), East African Meteorological Service.
- Haji Jama Ahmed Shirreh, First Akil of the Habr Yunis Tribe, Somaliland.
- Raymond Smith, Principal, Hodgson Technical College, Lusaka, Northern Rhodesia.
- Walter Frederick Stevenson, MC. For public services in Fiji.
- Spiro George Stragalis, Assistant Commissioner of Income-tax, Aden.
- Abdul Kayum Suffiad, Senior Executive Officer (Class I), Hong Kong.
- Samuel Frank Taylor, Higher Executive Officer, Office of the Crown Agents for Oversea Governments and Administrations.
- William Taylor, Manager, Thika Road House, East Africa High Commission.
- Theophilus Christopher Thorpe, Accountant, Treasury Department, Northern Region, Nigeria.
- Samuel Arthur Walke. For public services in Trinidad.
- Cyril Augustus Wallace, MB, BCh, Medical Officer, Tanganyika.
- John Randolph Ward, Senior Superintendent, Kenya Police Reserve.
- Dorothy Watson. For services to the Girl Guide movement in Nyasaland.
- William West, Chief Health Superintendent, Sierra Leone.
- Charles Wilkins, Works Officer, Pujehun District Council, Sierra Leone.
- Haji Yusuf bin Shamsuddin. Lately Chief Hospital Assistant, North Borneo.
- Aloysius Sajjabi Baligwa Ziriddamu, Office Assistant, Education Department, Uganda.

Honorary Member

- Sheikh Salim Mohamed Muhashamy, Liwali, Malindi, Kenya.

=== Order of the Companions of Honour (CH) ===
- The Right Honourable William Richard, Viscount Nuffield, GBE. For public and philanthropic services.

=== British Empire Medal (BEM) ===
Military Division

Royal Navy

- Chief Shipwright Artificer Alec James Carter, D/MX.55730.
- Chief Petty Officer Telegraphist (S) Eric Henry Clifford, P/JX.137194.
- Chief Petty Officer John William Frederick Cooke, P/J.113126.
- Radio Electrical Artificer 2nd Class Dennis Coombes, D/MX.101556.
- Petty Officer Dollah bin Sahat, Malayan Royal Naval Volunteer Reserve.
- Chief Engine Room Artificer George Dunn, D/MX.69516.
- Chief Engine Room Artificer Edwin Fry, P/MX.55157.
- Sergeant John Henry Genaway, Ply.X.5086, Royal Marines.
- Chief Engine Room Artificer Sidney William Gladwin, C/MX.52836.
- Chief Yeoman of Signals John George Govey, D/JX.129252.
- Chief Air Fitter (E) William Hunt, L./FX.75953.
- Chief Electrician Thomas Atkinson Wade Macpherson, DSM, D/MX.745967.
- Chief Engineering Mechanic Albert Ernest Stephen Mepstead, C/KX.84031.
- Chief Petty Officer Steward Joseph Mifsud, Malta E/LX.21921.
- Chief Electrical Artificer William Horace Mills, C/MX.57837.
- Chief Engineering Mechanic William Charles Morgan, P/KX.81630.
- Chief Petty Officer Claude Henry Nice, LD/3055, Royal Naval Volunteer Reserve.
- Chief Petty Officer Cook (S) Horace George Nichols, C/V.768465.
- Stores Chief Petty Officer (S) John George Parham, P/MX.47414.
- Chief Petty Officer George William Reed, P/JX.130888.
- Quartermaster Sergeant Gordon Ringe, Ch.X.2101, Royal Marines.
- Chief Wren Winifred Robinson, 40715, Women's Royal Naval Service.
- Chief Engineering Mechanic John Robert Robson, P/KX.84740.
- Chief Yeoman of Signals Arnold John Benjamin Rosenberg, DSM, C/JX.130728.
- Quartermaster Sergeant Joseph Forrester Sake, Ply.X.1089. Royal Marines.
- Chief Air Fitter (E) David Steele, L/FX. 80060.
- Chief Petty Officer Horace Ernest Tilley, P/JX.129480.
- Master-At-Arms Sidney Arthur Viggers, C/MX.767783.

Army

- NA/67385 Company Sergeant-Major Emmanuel Ajanaku, Nigerian Military Electrical and Mechanical Engineers.
- 5570857 Sergeant Herbert Jesse Alexander, The Wiltshire Regiment (Duke of Edinburgh's).
- 4399484 Sergeant Kenneth Flesher Barrett, Royal Army Ordnance Corps.
- 21019132 Sergeant Trevor Cashel Billingsley, Corps of Royal Electrical and Mechanical Engineers.
- 779141 Sergeant Maurice Edward Hickson-Brown, Royal Corps of Signals.
- 14469796 Staff-Sergeant Patrick Burke, Corps of Royal Electrical and Mechanical Engineers.
- 1414781 Staff-Sergeant Stanley Cyril Burton, Royal Regiment of Artillery.
- 22297742 Sergeant George Thomas Carey, 15th/19th The King's Royal Hussars, Royal Armoured Corps.
- 22777589 Sergeant George Albert Collins, Corps of Royal Electrical and Mechanical Engineers.
- 1876784 Warrant Officer Class II (acting) Jesse Allen Colquhoun, Corps of Royal Engineers.
- 21005451 Staff-Sergeant (acting) Dennis Convery, Royal Corps of Signals.
- 22840606 Sergeant Leonard Albert Crane, Royal Corps of Signals.
- T/22226407 Company-Quartermaster-Sergeant Edwin Elder, Royal Army Service Corps, Territorial Army.
- 5725697 Warrant Officer Class II (acting) Norman Brooke Elgie, MM, The Dorset Regiment.
- 1147918 Staff-Sergeant John Verrall Charles Federal, Intelligence Corps.
- 1943972 Squadron-Quartermaster-Sergeant John Fenwick, Corps of Royal Engineers.
- 1475772 Warrant Officer Class II (acting) Douglas Alan Godfrey, Army Catering Corps.
- S/5827181 Staff-Sergeant Eric Eugene Godfrey, Royal Army Service Corps.
- 2871544 Sergeant William George Grant, Royal Regiment of Artillery.
- 6343971 Staff-Sergeant (acting) Robert Hackney, Royal Army Ordnance Corps.
- 14797285 Sergeant (acting) Joseph Edward Phillip Hamblet, Army Catering Corps.
- 22222210 Sergeant Leonard Walter Hawkins, The Middlesex Regiment (Duke of Cambridge's Own), Territorial Army.
- 2928681 Warrant Officer Class I (acting) Henry Hector Hogben, The Queen's Own Cameron Highlanders.
- 2371789 Sergeant Percy Edwin Hollywood, Royal Corps of Signals, Territorial Army.
- 3908757 Sergeant Granville Jefferies, Army Catering Corps.
- 3129477 Colour-Sergeant William Johnstone, The Gordon Highlanders.
- 22803794 Sergeant Frederick James Walter Kedge, The East Surrey Regiment, Territorial Army.
- 21184303 Warrant Officer Class II (local) (now Staff-Sergeant (Artillery Clerk)) Garnet Seymour Kent, Royal Regiment of Artillery, Territorial Army.
- 906910 Staff-Sergeant (acting) (Artillery Clerk) John Charles Lane, Royal Regiment of Artillery.
- 22294540 Staff-Sergeant (acting) Joseph Arthur Locke, Corps of Royal Electrical and Mechanical Engineers.
- 22837848 Corporal Brian Longworth, Corps of Royal Engineers.
- 4258639 Staff-Sergeant John Archie McGuire, Corps of Royal Engineers, Territorial Army.
- 405400 Colour-Sergeant (Pipe-Major) John McNicol, The Black Watch (Royal Highland Regiment).
- 22550496 Staff-Sergeant (acting) David Munro McPhail, Royal Corps of Signals.
- T/14434569 Warrant Officer Class II (acting) William Miller, Royal Army Service Corps.
- 789329 Sergeant Hector Murray, Royal Regiment of Artillery, Territorial Army.
- S/14727273 Staff-Sergeant James Terence O'Hara, Royal Army Service Corps.
- 22803464 Bandsman Frank Edward Parkinson, DCM, The Northamptonshire Regiment, Territorial Army.
- 876651 Staff-Sergeant Norman Dennis Phelps, Corps of Royal Engineers.
- 14187707 Sergeant Bernard Lawrence Puckey, Corps of Royal Engineers.
- 1056808 Sergeant Norman Leach Redding, Royal Regiment of Artillery.
- 22530789 Sergeant John Ferguson Scott, The Parachute Regiment, Territorial Army.
- S/3197936 Warrant Officer Class II (acting) (now Staff-Sergeant) Cyril MacGeorge Tobin, Royal Army Service Corps.
- 5670179 (Sergeant William Roy Tuckfield, The Somerset Light Infantry (Prince Albert's).
- S/22293136 Warrant Officer Class II (acting) (now Staff-Sergeant) Thomas Wardle, Royal Army Service Corps.
- T/14495837 Company-Quartermaster-Sergeant Alban Lewis Watts, Royal Army Service Corps.
- 790281 Sergeant Hugh Graham Wilson, Royal Regiment of Artillery.
- S/6145347 Staff-Sergeant Albert Edward Woodhall, Royal Army Service Corps.
- Na/28225 Corporal Danladi Zaria, Royal West African Frontier Force.

Royal Air Force

- 569272 Flight Sergeant John Andrews.
- 569408 Flight Sergeant William Vincent Asprey.
- 533004 Flight Sergeant John Victor Ladas Barron.
- 2095401 Flight Sergeant Rita Beaumont, Women's Royal Air Force.
- 569267 Flight Sergeant Walter Ronald Carter.
- 570758 Flight Sergeant Gerard Roy Cater.
- 564583 Flight Sergeant Kenneth Chalkley.
- 574175 Flight Sergeant Derek John Clarke.
- 1330372 Flight Sergeant Kenneth Ernest Denny.
- 632477 Flight Sergeant Patrick Docherty.
- 965712 Flight Sergeant Frederick Fairclough Hesketh.
- 568221 Flight Sergeant Robert Hubble.
- 635935 Flight Sergeant Alfred Douglas Lucas.
- 1600449 Flight Sergeant Charles John Morrell.
- 591642 Flight Sergeant Charles William Morris.
- 520512 Flight Sergeant Walter Frederick Nelson.
- 1495311 Flight Sergeant Reginald Oram.
- 647825 Flight Sergeant John Raymond Parkes.
- 532505 Flight Sergeant William Parkes.
- Flight Sergeant (Acting Warrant Officer) Oswin Anthony Rosayro, Malayan Auxiliary Air Force, Singapore.
- 537388 Flight Sergeant Thomas George Salter.
- 567160 Flight Sergeant David Arthur Walters.
- 3025072 Flight Sergeant George Charles Watson.
- 543271 Chief Technician Eric Bottomley.
- 570239 Chief Technician Reginald Oliver Colley.
- 513674 Chief Technician Neville Percy Longley Hansford.
- 527334 Chief Technician James McKinney.
- 569948 Chief Technician William Phillips.
- 541495 Chief Technician Douglas Sidney Rayden.
- 547735 Acting Flight Sergeant Eric Selby Long.
- 572684 Acting Flight Sergeant William Howarth Sefton.
- 5854 Sergeant Ali Mohamad Aulaqi, Aden Protectorate Levies.
- 584134 Sergeant Roy Belding.
- 431102 Sergeant Vera Joan Bowles, Women's Royal Air Force.
- 458348 Sergeant Annie Cuthbert, Women's Royal Air Force.
- 4009411 Sergeant John Gallagher.
- 630687 Sergeant Ronald Sidney Heath.
- 538084 Sergeant Edward Lillie.
- 571758 Sergeant George Clifford Morgan.
- 2299477 Sergeant John Preston.
- 592317 Sergeant Stanley Bernard Walton.
- 649705 Sergeant Thomas Idris Williams.
- 435263 Sergeant Maisie Graham Willson, Women's Royal Air Force.
- 4010559 Senior Technician Albert William Shuck.
- 2330225 Corporal Harry Edward Studwell.
- 4154388 Senior Aircraftman James Bernard Stacey.

Civil Division

United Kingdom

- Frank Allen, Civilian Stores Officer, Grade II, Central Ordnance Depot, Didcot, War Office.
- Leslie Albert Andrews, Foreman Engineer, Stephen Walters & Sons, Ltd., Suffolk. (Sudbury.)
- Samuel Armstrong, JP, lately Byeworker, West Riding Colliery, North Eastern Division, National Coal Board. (Normanton.)
- Arthur Ashhurst, Deputy Chief Warden, Civil Defence Corps, Newcastle.
- Ernest John Attree, Head Gardener, French Region, Imperial War Graves Commission.
- Eleanor Baird, Collector, Boclair, Bishopbriggs Savings Group, Glasgow.
- Thomas Barthorpe, Skilled Turner, William Jessop & Sons, Ltd., Sheffield.
- Herbert Leslie Baylis, lately Chief Officer Class I, HM Borstal Institution, Rochester. (Beaconsfield.)
- Christopher Lawrence Beech, Foreman, British Chrome & Chemicals Ltd., Eaglescliffe. (Stockton-on-Tees.)
- Elijah Benn, Checkweighman, Woolley Colliery, North Eastern Division, National Coal Board. (Barnsley.)
- James Betton, Salvage Worker, Dodworth Colliery, North Eastern Division, National Coal Board. (Barnsley.)
- William Henry Blaney, Head Packer, National Physical Laboratory, Department of Scientific and Industrial Research. (Feltham.)
- Albert Booker, Local Shipwright Supervisor, HM Dockyard, Malta.
- John Lewis Brill, Principal Foreman of Stores, No. 10 Maintenance Unit, Air Ministry, Hullavington. (Chippenham.)
- Frederick James Bryant, Stone Contractor and Road Repairer, Markham Main Colliery, North Eastern Division, National Coal Board. (Doncaster.)
- Harry Buckley, Inspector (Postal), Chaucer Street Sorting Office, Oldham.
- Laura Bunch, Member of County Staff, Hampshire, Women's Voluntary Services. (Farnham, Surrey.)
- Adam Burgess, Foreman, Land Drainage Works, Department of Agriculture for Scotland. (Glasgow.)
- Alice Esther Burrell, Sub-Postmistress, Padgate Sub-Post Office, Warrington.
- Samuel Calvert, Governor Maintenance Foreman, Leeds District, North Eastern Gas Board. (Leeds.)
- Alexander Cameron, Laboratory Mechanic, Royal Navy Torpedo Experimental Establishment, Greenock.
- Elizabeth Campbell, Matron, Inverness Royal Academy War Memorial Hostel for Girls.
- William Hunter Carabine, Stores Stocktaker, Teesside Bridge & Engineering Co., Middlesbrough.
- Henry Bernard Chambers, Sub-Postmaster, Wheeler Street Post Office, Birmingham.
- William James Chinchen, Station Officer, Dorset Fire Brigade. (Swanage.)
- Miriam Claydon, Centre Organiser, Lexden and Winstree Rural District, Women's Voluntary Services. (Colchester.)
- William Henry Colclough, JP, Underground Mechanic, Holditch Colliery, West Midlands Division, National Coal Board. (Stoke-on-Trent.)
- Stuart Cole, Shed Master, Bristol, Western Region, British Railways. (Bristol.)
- Thomas Collett, Head Paper Maker, Wiggins, Teape & Co. (1919) Ltd., High Wycombe.
- Frederick George Collins, Research and Development Mechanic (Special), Royal Aircraft Establishment, Ministry of Supply, (Farnborough.)
- Henry Frank Collins, Technical Officer, Reading Telephone Area, Reading.
- George Cook, Chargehand Fitter (Electrical), Central Electricity Authority, North Eastern Division. (York.)
- Henry Carter Cope, Clerk of Works, No. 5 Works Area, Air Ministry, Finningley. (Uttoxeter.)
- Harry Lionel Newman Cox, School Staff Instructor, City of London School Combined Cadet Force. (Ilford.)
- Albert Edward Cracknell, Chief Steward, SS Esso Saranac, Esso Petroleum Co. Ltd. (London, E.4.)
- Samuel John Crocker, Mess Steward, Class I, School of Anti-Aircraft Artillery, War Office. (Tenby.)
- John Owen Davies, Repairer, Nine Mile Point Colliery, South Western Division, National Coal Board. (Pontllanfraith.)
- Jane Deakin, Aeronautical Inspection Service, Examiner, No. 25, Maintenance Unit, Air Ministry, Hartlebury. (Kidderminster.)
- Herbert Dean, lately Research and Development Craftsman Special (Inspector), Royal Aircraft Establishment, Ministry of Supply. (Farnborough.)
- Grace Annie Dodge, Supervisor (F), Welwyn Garden Telephone Exchange, Welwyn Garden City. (Hertford.)
- Gregory Louis Augustine Dunphy, MC, Superintendent, City of London Special Constabulary. (London, E.C.4.)
- Oswald Edwards, Research and Development Craftsman (Special), Explosives Research and Development Establishment, Waltham Abbey, Ministry of Supply.
- Francis Farnsworth, Leading Driver, Steam Turbine, Central Electricity Authority, East Midlands Division. (Kettering.)
- Walter Henry Ferris, Station Officer, Newbury Ambulance Station, Berkshire Ambulance Service.
- Lydia Lilian Rosalie Flinn, Transport Officer, Liverpool, Women's Voluntary Services. (Wallasey.)
- John Foster, Master Stamper, Garringtons Ltd., Bromsgrove. (Darlaston.)
- Charles F. Fox. For services to the blind in Kent.
- Irene Fox, Chief Supervisor (F), Telephone Exchange, Tipton, Staffordshire. (Dudley.)
- Albert Thomas Gotts, Excavator Driver, Caister Sea Defence Works, Norfolk. (Smallburgh.)
- Charles Edgar Grimmer, Chargehand Trimmer, B.R.S. (Parcels) Ltd., British Road Services. (Irthlingborough.)
- John William Hamilton, Airport Foreman I, London Airport, Ministry of Transport and Civil Aviation. (Southall.)
- Walter Owen Handy, Leading Stoker, Stourport "B" Power Station, Central Electricity Authority, Midlands Division. (Stourport-on-Severn.)
- William Justinian George Moore Harris, Chief Storekeeper, Royal Navy Engineering College, Plymouth.
- Thomas Stanley Hepplewhite, Fore-Overman, Seaham Colliery, Durham Division, National Coal Board. (Seaham.)
- Alfred Higham, JP, Surface Foreman, Astley Green Colliery, North Western Division, National Coal Board. (Manchester.)
- John Frederick Hill, Instructor, Ramsgate Sea Cadet Unit.
- Percy Claude Hooper, Honorary Collector, Mancot Street Savings Group, Queensferry.
- Leslie Norman Howes, Process Supervisor II, Harwell, United Kingdom Atomic Energy Authority.
- Rowland Hudson, Chief Wardmaster, Duchess of Gloucester House, Isleworth.
- George Huggins, Assistant Superintendent, Glasgow District Gasfitting and Maintenance Section, Scottish Gas Board.
- Ernest Hughes, Chargeman, Royal Ordnance Factory, Pembrey, Ministry of Supply. (Llanelly.)
- Ronald Wilfred Hunt, District Inspector (Training), Eastern Region, British Railways. (Enfield.)
- Sidney Frank Beresford Ingram, Inspector (Postal), Head Post Office, Southampton.
- William Ernest Percy Jelley, Warrant Officer, Sussex Army Cadet Force. (Eastbourne.)
- William Johnson, Process Supervisor in Aldermaston, United Kingdom Atomic Energy Authority. (Reading.)
- William Henry Johnston, Refrigerating Greaser, SS Caronia, Cunard Steamship Co. Ltd. (Liverpool.)
- Cecil Gordon Jones, Turbine Blader Chargehand, W. H. Allen, Sons & Co. Ltd., Bedford.
- George Henry Clement Jones, Foreman of Works, Science Museum. (Morden.)
- Hugh Jones, Foreman Electrician, Harland & Wolff, Ltd., Liverpool.
- William Francis Jones, Inspector (Postal). Post Office, Wellington, Shropshire. (Oakengates.)
- Peter Henry Jung, Honorary Collector, G54 Post Area Savings Group, Wandsworth.
- William Albert Kellaway, MM, Chief Paperkeeper, Tithe Redemption Commission. (London, E.2.)
- William Henry Edward Kelly, Principal Keeper, Lowestoft Light House, Corporation of Trinity House.
- Edith J. Kemble, Assistant to Regional Administrator (Clothing), Tunbridge Wells. Women's Voluntary Services. (Crowborough.)
- Thomas Morris Kennedy, Postal and Telegraph Officer, Divisional Controller's Office, General Post Office. (London, S.W.15.)
- Cornelius Keogh, Chief Supervisor (M), Head Post Office, Leeds.
- Mary Kerr, Centre Organiser, Bellshill, Women's Voluntary Services.
- William Law, Chief Inspector and Deputy Chief Constable, City of Perth Police Force.
- Gwendoline Marguerita Henriques Lee, Honorary Collector, Road Savings Groups, Filton, Bristol.
- John Lees, Chief Observer, Post 25/H.1. No. 25 Group, Royal Observer Corps. (New Cumnock, Ayrshire.)
- Dugald Logan, Chief Clerk Officer, HM Prison Aberdeen.
- Gilbert Logan, Deck Storekeeper, SS Southern Venturer, Chr. Salvesen & Co. (Leith.)
- Kwun Hor Low, Local Clerk, Grade I, Office of the Commander-in-Chief, Far East, Admiralty, Singapore.
- Muir McAlpine Lowe, Technical Officer, Rose Street Telephone Exchange, Edinburgh.
- John Mcdonald, Training Officer, Kingshill No. 1 Colliery, Scottish Division, National Coal Board. (Shotts.)
- John McEnanie, Motorman, Eastern Region, British Transport Commission. (Southend.)
- Thomas Brownlie Maclean, Civilian Instructor Grade III, No. 1 School of Technical Training, Air Ministry, Halton.
- Bernard William Patrick McShea, Manager, Combined N.A.A.F.I. Shop and Canteen, Christmas Island. (Felixstowe.)
- Sina Thamby Mariapah, Clerk, Class I, War Office, Singapore.
- Alexander Terence Martin, Engineering Technical Class, Grade II, Royal Ordnance Factory, Cardiff, Ministry of Supply.
- John Albert Martin, Chief Inspector, Newcastle upon Tyne City Police.
- George Robert Taylor Marwick, Head Chancery Messenger, Office of the Commissioner-General for the United Kingdom in South East Asia, Singapore.
- Edward Maskery, Overlooker, Royal Ordnance Factory, Swynnerton, Ministry of Supply. (Stoke-on-Trent.)
- Frederick Charles Mason, Chargehand, Research and Experimental Mechanic, Aldermaston, United Kingdom Atomic Energy Authority.
- Thomas Mason, lately Head Messenger, Ministry of Commerce for Northern Ireland. (Belfast.)
- Parappil Govinda Menon, Dresser, Grade I, Royal Air Force Tengah, Singapore.
- Thomas Miller, Checkweighman, Langley Park Colliery, Durham Division, National Coal Board.
- William George Stirling Moor, Instructor, Sanquhar Area, Dumfries and Galloway Division, Civil Defence Corps.
- Bertram Newrick Moore, Honorary Collector of Savings Group, Doxford's Shipyards, Sunderland.
- Charles Thomas Moore, Engraver and Die-sinker, W. R. Royle & Son, Ltd., London. (Chingford.)
- Albert Neville, Donkeyman, SS Southwood, Constantine Shipping Co. Ltd. (Newcastle upon Tyne.)
- Irene Mabel Norbury, Honorary Collector, Street Savings Group, Liverpool.
- Archibald William Nunn, Honorary Collector, Ketton Village Savings Group, Lincolnshire.
- Sydney Oliver, Charge-hand Overhead Linesman, North Western Electricity Board. (Whaley Bridge.)
- Tom Ivor Dennis Pabst, Member, Civil Defence Corps, Luton.
- Ronald Parfitt, Rescue Party Leader, Civil Defence Corps, Hampshire. (Andover.)
- Percy Parker, Blacksmith, Worksop Undertaking, East Midlands Gas Board.
- Ernest Howard Parsons, Pumpman, MV Hemisinus, Shell Tankers, Ltd. (North Shields.)
- William Henry Patterson, Sub-District Commandant, Ulster Special Constabulary. (Omagh.)
- John Peel, Fitter, West Wylam Colliery, Northern (N. & C.) Division, National Coal Board. (Prudhoe upon Tyne.)
- Ivo Oscar Frederick Peters, Chief Observer, Post 9/C.1. No. 9 Group, Royal Observer Corps. (Bath.)
- George James Plant, Supervisor (M), Pinner Telephone Exchange, Middlesex. (Greenford.)
- Osborne Avon Powell, Principal Foreman of Stores, No. 25 Maintenance Unit, Air Ministry, Hartlebury. (Kidderminster.)
- Frederick Thomas Alfred Power, MC, Principal Photographer, Royal Commission on Historical Monuments (England). (London, S.W.7.)
- Arthur Herbert Quennell, General Foreman, Harry Fairclough, Ltd., Howley, Wanington.
- Stanley Jackson Rich, DCM, Office Superintendent, Public Record Office. (London, S.W.16.)
- Hugh Robertson, Ambulance Driver, British Red Cross Society, Glasgow.
- Ernest James Robson, Exhauster House Attendant, Hendon Works, Sunderland, Northern Gas Board.
- Marguerite Wilson Rodger, Overseer, Donegall Square Branch Post Office, Belfast.
- Robert Rodger, lately Superintendent, Church of Scotland Hostel for Working Lads, Glasgow.
- Elsie Roome, Member, Women's Voluntary Services, attached to Junior Leaders Regiment, Royal Signals, Newton Abbot.
- Charles Edward Rushton, Foreman, Laneham Internal Drainage Board, Nottingham. (Retford.)
- Joseph Rushton, Conveyor Operator, Arkwright Colliery, East Midlands Division, National Coal Board. (Chesterfield.)
- John Gibson Russell, Research and Development Craftsman (Special) Chargehand, Armament Research and Development Establishment, Ministry of Supply. (Welling, Kent.)
- Ben Salter, Foreman Warp Twister, Beaumont & Smith, Ltd., Paisley.
- Evelyn Mary Scouller, Surgery Nurse, Paton & Baldwin Ltd., Darlington. (Hurworth-on-Tees.)
- Wallace Carol Shayler, Bulldozer Driver, Caister, Sea Defence Works, Norfolk. (Winterton-on-Sea.)
- William John Sims, Office Keeper, Grade II, Registry of Friendly Societies. (London, S.E.15.)
- Frank Percival Spencer, Apprentice-Gasfitter Training Instructor, Leicester Undertaking, East Midlands Gas Board.
- John Steel, Honorary Collector, Minton's Ltd. Savings Group, Stoke-on-Trent.
- Albert Thomas Stevens, Senior Foreman of Storehouses, Royal Navy Depot, Woolston. (Southampton.)
- Frank Edyvean Strike, Member, Coast Life Saving Coups, Porthleven L.S.A. Company. (Helston, Cornwall.)
- Walter John Sutton, Commandant, Somerset 11 Detachment, Somerset Branch British Red Cross Society. (Crewkerne.)
- Francis William Symmonds, Foreman Meter Reader, Harrogate Sub-Area, North Eastern Electricity Board.
- Charles Edward Tarry, lately Chief Officer, Class 1, HM Prison Lincoln. (Basingstoke.)
- William Norman Thomas, Engineer and Manager, Pwllheli and Portmadoc Undertakings, Wales Gas Board.
- Thomas Leslie Thompson, Foreman Fitter, Vickers-Armstrongs (Engineers), Ltd., Newcastle upon Tyne.
- James Thomson, Station Warden, Royal Air Force Bishopbriggs. (Paisley.)
- Thomas Thomson, Station Officer, Fife Fire Brigade. (Methil.)
- William Richard Tizzard, General Foreman, Bristol-Bath Division, South Western Gas Board.
- Joseph Martin Togwell, Storeman, Ministry of Works. (Mitcham, Surrey.)
- Edmund Walter Tolley, Area Inspector (Class 2), Templecombe, Southern Region, British Railways.
- Fred Toulson, Nursing Assistant, Bracebridge Heath Hospital, near Lincoln.
- Doris Mary Towers, Manageress, Refreshment Club, Board of Customs and Excise. (Hatch End, Middlesex.)
- Frederick William Turner, Stores Superintendent, Central Ordnance Depot, Didcot, War Office.
- Leslie Frank Virgo, Chief Technical Reconnaissance Officer, Civil Defence Corps, West Riding of Yorkshire. (Normanton.)
- John Walter Terence Voss, Chief Store Keeper, Machinery and Drainage Contract Service, Ministry of Agriculture, Fisheries and Food. (Leicester.)
- Frederick Charles Wade, Turner, Royal Naval Torpedo Factory, Alexandria, Dunbartonshire. (Gourock.)
- Archibald Frederick Walker, Works Foreman, The Mills Equipment Co. Ltd., London. (Enfield.)
- Bernard Theodore Walker, Tool Maker, Thomas Bolton & Sons, Ltd., Stoke-on-Trent.
- Arthur Raymond Ward, Inspector, Metropolitan Police. (London, S.E.1.)
- Charles Samuel Ward, JP, Ripper, Ansley Hall Colliery, West Midlands Division, National Coal Board. (Nuneaton.)
- Frederick Ward, lately Foreman, National Institute of Agricultural Botany. (Cambridge.)
- Robert Wearmouth, Works Superintendent, United Automobile Services, Ltd., British, Trans-port Commission. (Darlington.)
- Royston Nash Wellham, Head Postman, Post Office, Bedford.
- William White, Sub-Officer, Lincolnshire, Holland, Fire Brigade. (Crowland.)
- Tom Smith Willoughby, Checkweighman, Babbington Colliery, East Midlands Division, National Coal Board. (Nottingham.)
- Ernest Peter Wilson, Senior Messenger and Office Keeper, National Debt Office. (Woodford Bridge.)
- Fortune Stevenson Wilson, Sub-Postmistress, Brougham Street, Sub-Office, Greenock, Renfrewshire.
- Maggie Ann Woolnough, Sub-Postmistress and Allowance-Deliverer, Levington Sub-Office, Ipswich.
- William Wortley, Honorary Collector, Works Savings Group, Short Bros. & Harland, Ltd. (Belfast.)
- Edward Thomas Wright, Senior Supplies Superintendent, Supplies Department, General Post Office. (Enfield.)
- Herbert Harry Yardley, Chief Inspector, Birmingham City Police.
- George Yearsley, DCM, Colliery Training Officer, Celynen North and Graig Faiwr Colliery, South Western Division, National Coal Board. (Crumlin.)
- Robert Young, Chief Inspector, Tropicalisation & Packing Co. Ltd., Droitwich.

Australia

- Edward Barrett, Car Conductor, Department of Railways, State of New South Wales.

Basutoland

- Arthur Clement Maqutu, Postmaster, Maseru Post Office, Basutoland.
- Bright Ntsane, Sub-Accountant, National Treasury, Basutoland.

Overseas Territories

- Hussein Nasr al Buasi, Junior Assistant Adviser, Western Aden Protectorate.
- Sheikh Muhammad Said al Kharusi, Junior Assistant Adviser, Eastern Aden Protectorate.
- Gertrude Maud Humphreys, Ward Sister, Stann Creek Hospital, British Honduras.
- Jeffrey Leach, Detective Sergeant, Lancashire Constabulary, seconded to the Cyprus Police Force.
- Joseph Mounsey, (Detective Sergeant, Lancashire Constabulary, seconded to the Cyprus Police Force.
- Gordon Alfred Willard, Detective Sergeant, Metropolitan Police Force, seconded to the Cyprus Police Force.
- Benjamin Young, Assistant Stores Officer, Hong Kong.
- Munyambo Kirata, Interpreter, Government Service, Kiamfou, Kenya.
- Joseph Muthungu, Community Development Assistant, Department of Community Development, Kenya.
- Gabriel Njoroge, Head Screener, Kigumo Divisional Works Camp, Kenya.
- Sat Bachan Singh, lately Inspector, Kenya Police Force.
- George Christopher. For public services in British Vkgin Islands, Leeward Islands.
- Johnny Ngong, lately Chinda to the Fon of Bikom, Federation of Nigeria.
- Edward James Kateka, African Technical Assistant, Information Department, Northern Rhodesia.
- Eliah Kaligo, Sub-Inspector, Nyasaland Police Force.
- Moses Mainville Manley, Senior Veterinary Inspector, Veterinary Department, Sierra Leone.
- Jama Laiti, Senior Sergeant, Aw Barreh Liaison Illalo Force, Somaliland.
- Shabani Chandey, Liwali, Kilosa Township, Tanganyika.
- Evarista Ishemwezi, Town Headman, Bukoba, Tanganyika.
- Raphael s/o Salim, Sub-Chief of Momibo, Tanganyika.
- Olive Winnifred Crooks, Matron, Prison Service, Trinidad.
- Ben Roberts, Probation Officer, Grenada, Windward Islands.
- Musa bin Umar, Bailiff, Judicial Department, Zanzibar.

=== Royal Victorian Medal (RVM) ===
In Silver

- William Henry Allfrey.
- Leslie Walter John Ashton.
- 566640 Acting Warrant Officer (now Flying Officer) Leslie Arthur James Booker, BEM, Royal Air Force.
- William Devenney.
- Sergeant-Major William James Dodgson.
- Sidney George Johnson.
- 576611 Flight Sergeant Alan Redvers Marshall, Royal Air Force.
- Albert Edward Stringer.
- Police Constable Reginald George Summers, Metropolitan Police.
- William Herbert Watts.
- 573748 Flight Sergeant Cyril Henry Webb, Royal Air Force.
- Frederick White.
- Robert Young.

=== Royal Red Cross (RRC) ===
- Colonel Elizabeth Mackaness, ARRC, (206008), Queen Alexandra's Royal Army Nursing Corps.
- Lieutenant-Colonel Florence Barbara Cozens, ARRC, (206096), Queen Alexandra's Royal Army Nursing Corps.
- Wing Officer Mary Jopp, ARRC, (405068), Princess Mary's Royal Air Force Nursing Service.

==== Associate of the Royal Red Cross (ARRC) ====
- Margaret Mary Gallinagh, Superintending Sister, Queen Alexandra's Royal Naval Nursing Service.
- Christina Thompson, Senior Nursing Sister, Queen Alexandra's Royal Naval Nursing Service.
- Major Helena Heafey (206212), Queen Alexandra's Royal Army Nursing Corps.
- Major Edna Longworth (213787), Queen Alexandra's Royal Army Nursing Corps.
- Captain Elizabeth Margaret Gunn Scott (329729), Queen Alexandra's Royal Army Nursing Corps.
- Squadron Officer Ann Smith McDonald (405584), Princess Mary's Royal Air Force Nursing Service.

=== Air Force Cross (AFC) ===
- Group Captain Frank Ronald Bird, DSO, DFC, (33526).
- Wing Commander Charles Ronald Alexander, MBE, DFM, (44461).
- Wing Commander Charles Frank Bradley, DSO, (65493).
- Squadron Leader Rowland Percy Flood, (201040).
- Squadron Leader Walter Joseph Hurst (46169).
- Squadron Leader Grahame Henri Moreau (3038887).
- Squadron Leader Peter James Murch (127834).
- Squadron Leader Colin Donald Preece (1898620).
- Squadron Leader Dennis Leslie Stoten (163111).
- Squadron Leader Alan Desmond Woodcock (55275).
- Flight Lieutenant George Peter Aird (3110152).
- Flight Lieutenant Bryan Anthony Clayton (3110142).
- Flight Lieutenant Daniel Clifford Evans (203759).
- Flight Lieutenant Thomas Alvin Jackson (152900).
- Flight Lieutenant William Kenneth Jones (195856).
- Flight Lieutenant David Anthony Joseph Lawrenson (193434).
- Flight Lieutenant Raymond Eric William Loverseed (2471048).
- Flight Lieutenant Bert Ingarfield Stanley Perowne (151991).
- Flight Lieutenant Ronald Matthew Salt (607315).
- Flight Lieutenant John Slater, DFC, (172367).
- Flight Lieutenant John Leonard Spatcher (585048).
- Flight Lieutenant Arthur Cedric Thornton (173794).
- Flight Lieutenant William Kenneth Wightman (163784).
- Flying Officer Norman Edgar Rose (1627339).
- Master Signaller Norman Gamble, DFM, (1232573).

==== Bar to Air Force Cross ====
- Wing Commander David Beatty Fitzpatrick, OBE, AFC, (40525).
- Wing Commander Roderick Frank Harman, DFC, AFC, (42834).
- Wing Commander Peter Westwood Jamieson, AFC, (65982).
- Wing Commander Clive King Saxelby, DFC, AFC, (36275).
- Squadron Leader Roy John Alexander Leslie, DSO, AFC, (36255).
- Squadron Leader David Roberts, DFC, AFC, (150196).
- Squadron Leader Arthur George Steele, AFC, (151923).
- Squadron Leader Frederick Percival Walker, AFC, (59499).

==== Second Bar to Air Force Cross ====
- Squadron Leader Roger Leslie Topp, AFC, (166654).

=== Air Force Medal (AFM) ===
- 1532023 Flight Sergeant Thomas Fraser.
- 1815993 Flight Sergeant Frank Glynn Hatton.
- 1624470 Flight Sergeant, (now Pilot Officer) John William Holley Murdin.
- 1605768 Flight Sergeant Bernard Douglas Saxby.
- 1586369 Flight Sergeant Lionel John Charles Wilcox.
- 3507274 Sergeant David Graham Scarle.

=== Queen's Commendation for Valuable Service in the Air ===
United Kingdom

- Captain Eric Stanley Draper, AFC, Senior Captain, First Class, British European Airways.
- Charles Evans, Flight Navigation Officer, Britannia 102 Flight, British Overseas Airways Corporation.
- Harry Hughes, Flight Engineer Officer, Britannia 312 Flight, British Overseas Airways Corporation.
- George Stanley Noble, Senior Experimental Officer, Royal Radar Establishment, Ministry of Supply.
- Harry Beaumont Seed, Radio Officer A, British European Airways.
- Captain Arthur Patrick Staples, Senior Captain, First Class, British Overseas Airways Corporation.

Royal Navy

- Lieutenant-Commander William Russell Hart.
- Lieutenant-Commander Geoffrey Raymond Higgs.

Royal Air Force

- Squadron Leader William Thomas Edward Bowden (188731).
- Squadron Leader Charles Edward Keay (130181).
- Squadron Leader William John Lawrence Sheehan, DFC, (55853).
- Flight Lieutenant John Ernest Joseph Auton (1508722).
- Flight Lieutenant Jack Bell (021622), Royal Australian Air Force.
- Flight Lieutenant Brian Carroll (2532386).
- Flight Lieutenant Ronald Edward Crompton-Batt, DFC, (169498).
- Flight Lieutenant Thomas Edward Michael Dunne (181677).
- Flight Lieutenant Decree Roy Foster (181507).
- Flight Lieutenant Robert Acford Franks (189489).
- Flight Lieutenant Norman Harry Frost, DFC, (171443).
- Flight Lieutenant Bruce Edward Harvatt (3110066).
- Flight Lieutenant Kenneth Hunt (582185).
- Flight Lieutenant Wilfred Allen Jenkins (165692).
- Flight Lieutenant Charles Mervyn Patrick Kempster (39882).
- Flight Lieutenant John Alonzo McArthur, (607151).
- Flight Lieutenant Thomas Perry (199610).
- Flight Lieutenant Stanley Jeffrey Bates Roe (169207).
- Flight Lieutenant Norman Maxwell Shorter (196954).
- Flight Lieutenant Ian Edward Suren (3504823).
- Flight Lieutenant Albert John Watton, DFC, (121076).
- Flying Officer Archibald Gardiner Carmichael (1825808).
- Flying Officer Zbigniew Henryk Czarnecki (780829).
- Flying Officer Leslie Jarvis Hargreaves (4084685).
- Flying Officer Arnold John Rose (3514140), RAF Reserve of Officers.
- Flying Officer Harry Grieve Thomson (4113155).
- Master Navigator John Edward Gibson (1109444).
- Master Signaller Colin Churm, DFC, (570078).
- Master Signaller Gerald Edgar Morbey (1432086).
- 1892231 Flight Sergeant Albert Reginald Fuller.
- 1393844 Flight Sergeant Ernest Ivor Linnett.
- 1801687 Flight Sergeant Herbert Joseph Wallbank.
- 622475 Acting Flight Sergeant John Parr.

=== Queen's Police Medal (QPM) ===
England and Wales

- Edward James Dodd, CBE, Chief Constable, Birmingham City Police.
- Cyril Thomas Gordon Carter, Chief Constable, York City Police.
- Joseph Wright Teasdale Smith, Assistant Chief Constable, Liverpool City Police.
- Walter Warren, Chief Superintendent and Deputy Chief Constable, Blackpool Borough Police.
- Tom Athron, Chief Superintendent, Cheshire Constabulary.
- Reginald Charles Yeoman, Detective Superintendent, Wiltshire Constabulary.
- Robert Redvers Bennison, Superintendent, North Riding Constabulary.
- Thomas George Dennis, Superintendent, Metropolitan Police.
- Albert Arthur Walker, Superintendent, Berkshire Constabulary.
- Douglas Cyril Grant, Detective Superintendent, Metropolitan Police.
- James William Robertson Henderson, Superintendent, Metropolitan Police.
- Leonard Thomas John Allthorpe, MM, Superintendent, Norfolk Constabulary.

Scotland

- Robert Brown, BEM, Superintendent, Dundee City Police.
- William Patrick Mennie, Superintendent, Scottish North Eastern Counties Constabulary.

Northern Ireland

- Thomas Carson, Head Constable, Royal Ulster Constabulary.

State of New South Wales

- Peter James Mclaughlin, BEM, Superintendent 3rd Class, New South Wales Police Force.
- John Gordon, Superintendent 3rd Class, New South Wales Police Force.
- John Joseph Stafford, Superintendent 3rd Class. New South Wales Police Force.
- Louis James Fordham, Inspector 1st Class, New South Wales Police Force.
- Bertie Leonard King, Superintendent 2nd Class, New South Wales Police Force.
- Frederick Stanley Windsor, Superintendent 3rd Class, New South Wales Police Force.

Southern Rhodesia

- Major Ernest Stanley Streeter, Assistant Commissioner, British South Africa Police.

Overseas Territories

- Ronald Edward Rowbottom, MBE, Assistant Chief Constable, Cyprus Police Force.
- Arthur Llewelyn Griffith, Assistant Commissioner, Kenya Police Force.
- Leslie Wilfred Slater, Assistant Commissioner, Trinidad Police Force.

=== Queen's Fire Services Medal (QFSM) ===
England and Wales

- Frank Mott, Divisional Officer, London Fire Brigade.
- Leslie George Bridgman, Assistant Chief Officer, Kent Fire Brigade.
- Joseph Clitherow, CBE, lately Chief Officer, Lancashire Fire Brigade.
- George John Cotton, Divisional Officer, Hertfordshire Fire Brigade.
- Sidney George Arthur Rackliff, Divisional Officer, Middlesex Fire Brigade.

State of Victoria

- Leonard Paton Whitehead, Chief Officer, Metropolitan Fire Brigade, Melbourne.

=== Colonial Police Medal (CPM) ===
Southern Rhodesia

- Edric Wynne Blyth, Superintendent, British South Africa Police.
- Captain George Charles Digweed, British South Africa Police.
- Douglas, Station Sergeant, British South Africa Police.
- John Macpherson, Superintendent, British South Africa Police.
- Mahumbe, Detective Station Sergeant, British South Africa Police.
- James Albert Mitchell, Staff Chief Inspector, British South Africa Police.
- Harold Harry Puttrell Thacker, Detective Chief Inspector, British South Africa Police.

Bechuanaland

- Captain Kevin Adair Lowry, Bechuanaland Protectorate Police Force.
- Senoko Ntsane, Sergeant, Bechuanaland Protectorate Police Force.

Overseas Territories

- Alfani s/o Mayunga, Sergeant, Tanganyika Police Force.
- Abu Bakar bin Mohamed Ali, Sub-Inspector, Singapore Police Force.
- Robert Stanley Bearne, Detective Inspector, Cyprus Police Force.
- Cecil Douglas Bourne, Assistant Superintendent, St. Lucia Police Force.
- John Dudley Brawn, Superintendent, Cyprus Police Force.
- Thomas Cashman, Acting Senior Superintendent, Hong Kong Police Force.
- Robert Arthur Clarke, MBE, Superintendent, Cyprus Police Force.
- Michael Kpundeh Curley, Sergeant, Sierra Leone Police Force.
- John Doull, Superintendent, Sierra Leone Police Force.
- Alfred Drax, Third Officer, Trinidad and Tobago Fire Services.
- Louis Orok Edet, Superintendent, Nigeria Police Force.
- James Kenneth England, Assistant Superintendent, Cyprus Police Force.
- Gerald George Gabbett, Chief Inspector, Kenya Police Reserve.
- Eric Charles Philip Glaisher, Senior Superintendent, Nigeria Police Force.
- Edward Percy Dorrien Greaves, Superintendent, Jamaica Constabulary.
- Yashar Halil K. Hassan, Sergeant, Cyprus Police Force.
- William Edward Henry Holdsworth, Assistant Superintendent, Cyprus Police Force.
- John Loritz Hvass, lately Field Intelligence Officer, Kenya Police Force.
- Robert Christopher Irving, MVO, Superintendent, Lagos Special Constabulary, Nigeria.
- John Edward Jackson, Sergeant, Cyprus Police Force.
- Jantan bin Senin, (Sub-Inspector, Singapore Police Force.
- George Guthrie Johnston, Senior Superintendent, Tanganyika Police Force.
- Kapito, Detective Sub-Inspector, Northern Rhodesia Police Force.
- Kimngetich arap Tanui, Assistant Inspector, Kenya Police Force.
- Sidney Lorraine King, Superintendent, Aden Police Force.
- Denis Roy Melville La Borde, Deputy Superintendent, British Guiana Police Force.
- Lee Hi, Sergeant, Hong Kong Police Force.
- Lim Chin Teck, Detective Sergeant, Singapore Police Force.
- Lim Song Leong, Chief Foreman, Singapore Fire Brigade.
- Frederick Llambias, Divisional Inspector, Gibraltar Police Force.
- Stanley Lwanga, Sub-Inspector, Uganda Police Force.
- John Lynn, MVO, Superintendent, Nigeria Police Force.
- Malimbeka s/o Kabugeya, Sergeant, Tanganyika Police Force.
- Leslie Alfred Marsden, Senior Superintendent, Nigeria Police Force.
- John Gerhard Meyer, Superintendent, Zanzibar Police Force.
- Leighton George Minnett, Superintendent, Kenya Police Force.
- Hussein Mohamed, Assistant Inspector, Kenya Police Force.
- Seiyed Mohamed bin Mohamed, Chief Inspector, Aden Police Force.
- Mohamed Noor bin Musa, Sub-Inspector, Singapore Police Force.
- Peter Okola Ochieng, Chief Inspector, Kenya Police Force.
- Zokayo Odoki, Head Constable, Uganda Police Force.
- Peter Ohiomoba, Sub-Inspector, Nigeria Police Force.
- John Okereke, Sergeant, Nigeria Police Force.
- Dimba Okut, Assistant Inspector, Kenya Police Force.
- Michael Elia Petrides, Sergeant, Cyprus Police Force.
- Alistair Ronald John Philip, Chief Inspector, Kenya Police Reserve.
- Ernest Aubrey Phillips, Superintendent, Uganda Police Force.
- William Geoffrey Popple, MC, Senior Superintendent, Tanganyika Police Force.
- Peter Riley, Superintendent, Kenya Police Force.
- John William Ellis Ross, Superintendent, Northern Rhodesia Police Force.
- William Scott, Superintendent, Uganda Police Force.
- Kam Selem, Assistant Superintendent, Nigeria Police Force.
- Urich Bertwin Selvon, Second Officer, Trinidad Volunteer Fire Brigade.
- Peter Gordon Fane Sewell, Senior Superintendent, Nigeria Police Force.
- Gurdial Singh, Deputy Superintendent, Singapore Police Force.
- Mehmet Souleiman, Sergeant, Cyprus Police Force.
- Brian John Dereck Sullivan, Assistant Superintendent, Cyprus Police Force.
- Arthur James Taylor, Inspector, Cyprus Police Force.
- Janardanan Thanappan Thampi, Assistant Superintendent, Tanganyika Police Force.
- Theodoros Constantinou Theocharides, Inspector, Cyprus Police Force.
- James Mutisya Wathome, Inspector Grade I, Kenya Police Force.
- Robert Weldon, Superintendent, Nyasaland Police Force.
- Alan Edward George Wheeler, Chief Inspector, Hong Kong Police Force.
- Ronald Harry Woodhead, Acting Senior Superintendent, Hong Kong Police Force.
- Yang Yu Fa, Sub-Inspector Grade I, Hong Kong Police Force.

== Australia ==
=== Knight Bachelor ===
- Major-General Walter Joseph Cawthorn, CB, CIE, CBE, High Commissioner for the Commonwealth of Australia in Pakistan.
- Herbert Ronald Robinson Grieve, ChM, MB, of Earlwood, New South Wales. For services to Medicine.
- The Very Reverend Francis William Rowland, CMG, OBE, MC, Moderator-General, Presbyterian Church of Australia, 1954–1957. For public services.
- Ralph Whishaw, CBE, ChM, FRCP, of Sandy Bay, Tasmania. For services to Medicine.

=== Order of the Bath ===
==== Companion of the Order of the Bath (CB) ====
Military Division

- Rear-Admiral Charles Carr Clark, OBE, DSC, Royal Australian Navy.

=== Order of Saint Michael and Saint George ===
==== Knight Commander of the Order of St Michael and St George (KCMG) ====
- Lieutenant-General Eric Winslow Woodward, CB, CBE, DSO, Australian Army. For services to the Commonwealth of Australia.

==== Companion of the Order of St Michael and St George (CMG) ====
- Francis Armand Bland, Emeritus Professor, University of Sydney, New South Wales. For public services.
- Roy Lancaster Curthoys, of South Yarra, Victoria. For services to Journalism.
- The Right Reverend Philip Nigel Warrington Strong, Bishop of New Guinea.

=== Order of the British Empire ===
==== Knight Commander of the Order of the British Empire (KBE) ====
Civil Division

- Major-General George Frederick Wootten, CB, CBE, DSO, ED, Chairman of the Repatriation Commission.

==== Commander of the Order of the British Empire (CBE) ====
Military Division

- Major-General Charles Hector Finlay, OBE, (2/25), Australian Staff Corps.
- Brigadier Roy Russell Gordon, DSO, ED, (3/77301), Citizen Military Forces, Commonwealth of Australia.
- Air Vice-Marshal Henry George Acton, OBE, Royal Australian Air Force.

Civil Division

- Norman Lethbridge Cowper, of Wahroonga, New South Wales. For services to Education.
- Keith Ephinston Grainger, of Canberra. For public services.
- Ernest Hearn, of Victoria Park, Western Australia. For services to Commerce and Industry.
- Leslie Rae Lucke, OBE, of North Hobart, Tasmania. For services to ex-service men and women.
- Horace Lionel Richard Niall, MBE, of Lae, New Guinea. For public services in Papua and New Guinea.
- Robert Gumley Osborne, of Kew, Victoria. For public services.
- John Thomson, of Roleystone, Western Australia. For services to primary industry.
- Cedric Oban Turner, of Turramurra, New South Wales. For services to civil aviation.

==== Officer of the Order of the British Empire (OBE) ====
Military Division

- Acting Captain Max Joshua Clark, DSC, Royal Australian Navy.
- Commander Stanley Thomas George Beedham, VRD, Royal Australian Naval Reserve.
- Lieutenant-Colonel William Blythe Caldwell, DSO, MC, (6/9311), Royal Australian Infantry Corps.
- Colonel (temporary) Richard Durance (3/37506), Australian Staff Corps.
- Colonel Earl Charles Lord (3/48), Royal Australian Army Ordnance Corps.
- Squadron Leader Douglas Walter Leckie, AFC, (034446), Royal Australian Air Force.

Civil Division

- Arthur George Bennett, lately Deputy Commonwealth Crown Solicitor, Sydney.
- Francis Felix Clausen, MM, lately Deputy Commonwealth Crown Solicitor, Melbourne.
- John Gordon Davis, of South Yarra, Victoria. For services to ex-service personnel and their dependants.
- Claude Faragher, of Newmarket, Queensland, in recognition of his services in the Postal Department.
- Ian Bowman Fleming, of Mitcham, Victoria. For services to the aircraft industry.
- John James Bradshaw Hanley, Chief Commonwealth Auditor, New South Wales.
- Charles Henry Holmes, MC, of Mount Eliza, Victoria. For services to the Australian travel industry.
- Jessie Mary Johnston, of Toorak, Victoria. For valuable services to the community.
- William Theodore Kelly, of Bellevue Hill, New South Wales. For services to the RAAF Canteens Services Board.
- Walter Albert Lindrum, MBE, of Albert Park, Victoria. For services in connection with patriotic and charitable appeals.
- Tom Inglis Moore, of Canberra, in recognition of his contribution to Australian literature.
- Raymond Nicholson, lately Assistant Secretary, Department of Air.
- Captain Oscar Adolph Nilsson, of Edgecliff, New South Wales. For services to the Merchant Marine.
- Stanley Lewis Prescott, of Nedlands, Western Australia. For services to the Medical School Appeal Fund of Western Australia.
- Frederick John Walters, of Brighton, Victoria. For public services.
- John Leslie Watkins, of East Hawthorn, Victoria. For services to the air transport industry.

==== Member of the Order of the British Empire (MBE) ====
Military Division

- Electrical Lieutenant Raymond Arthur Rutherford, Royal Australian Navy.
- Lieutenant Commander Howard Frank Goodwin, VRD, Royal Australian Naval Reserve.
- Major (temporary) Laurence Colin Campbell (4/34301), Royal Corps of Australian Electrical and Mechanical Engineers.
- Captain Llewellyn David Harries (2/163012), Royal Australian Army Ordnance Corps.
- 5/417 Warrant Officer Class I Lawrence Harold Jamieson, Royal Australian Army Service Corps.
- Major Stuart Gordon Kingwell (4/70), Australian Staff Corps.
- Major Evan Frederick Lewis (3/37679), Royal Australian, Army Ordnance Corps.
- Major (temporary) Noel William Jack Monday (2/37517), Australian Staff Corps.
- Major (temporary) John Murray (1/28920), Royal Australian Infantry Corps.
- Squadron Leader Sydney William Trewin (011386), Royal Australian Air Force.
- Acting Flight Lieutenant Herbert Charles Hatherly (042026), Royal Australian Air Force.
- Warrant Officer Arthur Samuel Clarke (031128), Royal Australian Air Force.

Civil Division

- Archibald Charles Blackwood, JP, State Secretary, Tasmanian Branch of the Returned Sailors', Soldiers' and Airmen's Imperial League of Australia.
- Stanley Hinton Christian, Principal, Malaria Control School, Minj, Territory of Papua and New Guinea.
- William John Crossin, JP, a retired Postal Officer, formerly Overseer in Charge, Bulk Postage and Branch Parcels Office, General Post Office, Sydney.
- Lilian Tenelba Amelia Hodgson, of Katoomba, New South Wales. For services rendered under the auspices of charitable organisations.
- Margaret Holmes, of Kew, Victoria. For services rendered in connection with the assimilation of war-time refugees and post-war migrants into Australia.
- Violet Hudson, of Barham, New South Wales. For services to Nursing.
- Philip Henry Jeffery, of Parramatta, New South Wales. For public services.
- Edith Latham Kernot, of Geelong, Victoria. For services rendered under the auspices of charitable and social welfare organisations.
- Harold Watson Lett, of Cessnock, New South Wales. For public services.
- Kate Gregory Livingston, Supervisory Typist, Army Headquarters, Department of the Army.
- The Reverend William Frederick MacKenzie, of the Aurukun Presbyterian Mission, Gulf of Carpentaria.
- Captain Rupert Albert Meates, of Trans Australia Airlines.
- Mabel Peoples, of Broken Hill, New South Wales. For social welfare services.
- Alderman Robert Adam Don Roth, JP, Mayor of the Municipality of Mudgee, New South Wales.
- Margaret Alice Street, Personal Assistant to High Commissioners for the Commonwealth of Australia in London.
- Ralph Noel Thompson, Director, Defence Signals Branch, Department of Defence.
- Thornley Arnold Thorpe, General Manager, Hotel Canberra, Australian Capital Territory.
- Frederick Albert Wyatt, formerly District Inspector, Postmaster-General's Department, Townsville, Queensland.

=== British Empire Medal (BEM) ===
Military Division

Royal Australian Navy

- Chief Engine Room Artificer Charles Lloyd Cunynghame, 35966.
- Stores Chief Petty Officer (S) Leslie Gordon Phillips, R.28109.

Australian Army

- 3/852 Sergeant Robert Laklan Anderson, Royal Australian Army Medical Corps.
- 4/10018 Sergeant (temporary Warrant Officer, Class II) Brian Clement Bond, Royal Australian Armoured Corps.
- 2/66476 Sergeant James Gilda Dunn, Royal Australian Infantry Corps.
- 3/73353 Sergeant William Roy Guest, Royal Australian Infantry, Corps.
- 5/2120 Private (temporary Warrant Officer Class I) Lewis MacLennan, Royal Australian Infantry Corps.
- 2/46319 Staff-Sergeant Ronald David Parsons, Royal Australian Engineers.
- 6/660 Staff-Sergeant Wilfred Edward Millhouse Tilyard, Royal Australian Corps of Signals.

Royal Australian Air Force

- A35457 Flight Sergeant William Leiphardt Smith Harper.
- A5150 Flight Sergeant William Albert Hince.
- A638 Sergeant Geoffrey Ian Butler.

Civil Division

- Valentine Robin Birks, Officer-in-Charge, Broome Radio Station, Western Australia.
- Henry Joseph Hicks, Officer-in-Charge, Radio Weather Reporting Station, Willis Islets.
- Herbert Emberson South, Car Driver, Department of Supply, New South Wales.
- Kathleen Veronica Waldron, Phonogram Monitor, Telegraph Service Branch, Postmaster-General's Department, Western Australia.

=== Royal Red Cross (RRC) ===
==== Associate of the Royal Red Cross (ARRC) ====
- Major Dorothy Janet Campbell (F4/1094), Royal Australian Army Nursing Corps.

=== Air Force Cross (AFC) ===
Royal Australian Air Force

- Wing Commander Patrick John McMahon, DFC, (0388).
- Squadron Leader Thomas Jewitt Tudberry Meldrum (012631).
- Squadron Leader Geoffrey Gordon Michael (05842).

=== Queen's Commendation for Valuable Service in the Air ===
- Flying Officer Thomas Fehily (011442), Royal Australian Air Force.

== Ghana ==
=== Order of Saint Michael and Saint George ===
==== Companion of the Order of St Michael and St George (CMG) ====
- Michael Kirkham Needham Collens, CBE, Commissioner of Police, Ghana.

=== Order of the British Empire ===
==== Commander of the Order of the British Empire (CBE) ====
Civil Division

- John Jackson, Land Boundary Settlement Commissioner.
- Ifor Wyn Pugh, formerly Director of Public Works.

==== Officer of the Order of the British Empire (OBE) ====
Military Division

- Lieutenant-Colonel (temporary) (now Major) Benjamin Dalton, DSO, (105089), the Royal Sussex Regiment; until recently on loan to the Government of Ghana.
- Lieutenant-Colonel Philip Frank St. Clair Harrison, DSO, (64605), The King's Own Scottish Borderers (now R.A.R.O.); until recently on loan to the Government of Ghana.
- Lieutenant-Colonel William Berry Westcott, MBE, (182521), Royal Army Pay Corps; at present on loan to the Government of Ghana.

Civil Division

- Charles Bowesman, MD, FRCS(Ed.), formerly Specialist (Surgery), Ministry of Health.
- Thomas Alexander Mead, formerly Regional Officer in Togoland.

==== Member of the Order of the British Empire (MBE) ====
Military Division

- Captain (Quartermaster) William MacGregor (371749), The Duke of Wellington's Regiment (West Riding); until recently on loan to the Government of Ghana.

Civil Division

- Henry William Akester, formerly Chief Technical Superintendent, Broadcasting Department.
- Herbert Frederick Crebbin, a Director of the United Africa Company of Ghana Ltd. For public services.
- George Millar Edington, MD, formerly Specialist Pathologist, Ministry of Health.
- Jessie Erica Powell, a Private Secretary in the Prime Minister's Office.

== Rhodesia and Nyasaland ==
=== Knight Bachelor ===
- Stephen Lewis Courtauld, MC, Chairman of the Board of Trustees, Rhodes National Gallery, Federation of Rhodesia and Nyasaland.

=== Order of the British Empire ===
==== Commander of the Order of the British Empire (CBE) ====
Military Division

- Air Commodore Edward Ward Seymour Jacklin, OBE, AFC, ADC, Royal Rhodesian Air Force.

Civil Division

- Norman Archibald Thomson, Postmaster-General, Federation of Rhodesia and Nyasaland.

==== Officer of the Order of the British Empire (OBE) ====
Military Division

- Lieutenant-Colonel Robert Adair Goodacre Prentice, Military Forces of the Federation of Rhodesia and Nyasaland.

Civil Division

- Stella Lewise Tennant Blakeway. For services to Education in the Federation of Rhodesia and Nyasaland.
- William Margolis, MBE. For public services in the Federation of Rhodesia and Nyasaland, especially as a member of the Grain Marketing Board of Southern Rhodesia.
- Commander John Percy Pitt Michell, MVO, Royal Navy (Retired), Comptroller to the Household of the Governor-General, Federation of Rhodesia and Nyasaland.
- Noel Parkin Sellick, MC, Director of Meteorological Services, Federation of Rhodesia and Nyasaland.

==== Member of the Order of the British Empire (MBE) ====
Civil Division

- Bruce Keith Anderson, President of the Northern Rhodesia Council, British Empire Service League, Federation of Rhodesia and Nyasaland.
- Stewart Reginald Green, Chairman of the Northern Rhodesia Tobacco Cooperative Society, Federation of Rhodesia and Nyasaland.
- Frank Walters Greville, a Director of the Farmers' Co-operative Limited, Salisbury, Southern Rhodesia. For public services in the Federation of Rhodesia and Nyasaland.

=== British Empire Medal (BEM) ===
Civil Division

- John Robertson, Engine Driver, Rhodesia Railways, Federation of Rhodesia and Nyasaland.
