= List of closed railway stations in Great Britain: A =

The list of closed railway stations in Great Britain includes the following. The year of closure is given if known. Stations reopened as heritage railways continue to be included in this list and some have been linked. Some stations have been reopened to passenger traffic. Some lines remain in use for freight and mineral traffic. (Recently closed stations are included.)

Station (Town, unless in station name)	Rail company	Year closed	Notes
Abbey and West Dereham	GER	1930	
Abbey Foregate (Shrewsbury)	S&WTN	1912	
Abbey Junction	NBR, CR	1921	
Abbey of Deer Platform	L&NER	1939	
Abbey Town	NBR	1964	
Abbeydore	GWR	1941	
Abbeyhill (Edinburgh)	NBR	1964	
Abbots Ripton	GNR	1958	
Abbots Wood Junction	MR	1855	
Abbotsbury	GWR	1952	
Abbotsford Ferry	NBR	1931	
Abbotsham Road	BWH!&AR	1917	
Aber (LNWR)	C&HR	1960	
Aberaman	TVR	1964	
Aberangell	MR/CR	1931	
Aberavon (Seaside)	R&SBR	1962	
Aberavon Town	R&SBR	1962	
Aberayron	GWR	1951	
Aberbargoed	B&MJR	1962	
Aberbeeg	GWR	1962	
Aberbran	N&BR	1962	
Abercairny	CR	1951	
Abercamlais	N&BR	1962	
Abercanaid	GWR/RR Jt	1951	
Abercarn	GWR	1962	
Aberchalder	HR/NBR	1933	
Abercrave	N&BR	1932	
Abercwmboi Halt	TVR	1956	
Abercynon North	British Rail	2008	
Aberdare High Level	GWR	1964	reopened 1988
Aberdare Low Level	TVR	1964	
Aberdeen Ferryhill	AR	1864	
Aberdeen Guild Street	AR	1867	
(Aberdeen) Holburn Street	GNoSR	1937	
(Aberdeen) Hutcheon Street	GNoSR	1937	
Aberdeen Kittybrewster (3 stations of this name, on 2 lines; all closed)	GNoSR	1856	
Aberdeen Waterloo	GNoSR	1867	
Aberderfyn Halt	GWR	1915	
Aberdylais Halt	GWR	1964	
Aberedw	CR	1962	
Aberfan	GWR/RR Jt	1951	
Aberfeldy	HR	1965	
Aberford	AR	1924	
Aberfoyle	NBR	1951	
Abergavenny Brecon Road	MT&AR	1958	
Abergavenny Junction	GWR	1958	
Aberglaslyn	WHR	1936	reopened as Nantmor in 2010
Abergwili	L&NWR	1963	
Abergwynfi	GWR	1960	
Aberkenfig	L&OR	1870	
Aberlady	NBR	1932	
Aberllefenni	CR	1931	
Aberlour	GNoSR	1965	
Abermule	CR	1965	
Abernant	GWR	1962	
Abernethy (NBR)	NBR	1955	
Abernethy Road	E&NR	1848	
Abersychan and Talywain	LNWR/GWR Jt	1941	
Abersychan Low Level	GWR	1962	
Abertafol (formerly Abertafol Halt)	GWR	1985	
Aberthaw High Level	BR	1964	
Aberthaw Low Level	TVR	1930	
Aberthin Platform	TVR	1920	
Abertillery (1st)	GWR	1893	
Abertillery (2nd)	GWR	1962	
Abertridwr	RR	1964	
Abertysswg	B&MTJR	1930	
Aberystwyth (Vale of Rheidol Railway) (1st)	GWR	1925	
Aberystwyth (Vale of Rheidol Railway) (2nd)	GWR	1968	
Abingdon	GWR	1963	
Abingdon Junction	GWR	1873	
Abingdon Road Halt	GWR	1915	
Abington (South Lanarkshire)	CAL	1965	
Abington (Cambridgeshire)	NR	1851	
Aboyne	GNoSR	1966	
Aby for Claythorpe	GNR	1961	
Achterneed	HR	1965	
Ach-na-Cloich	CR	1965	
Ackworth	S&KJR	1951	
Acrefair	GWR	1965	
Acrow Halt	British Railways	1964	
Adam Street (Cardiff)	RR	1871	
Adderbury	GWR	1951	
Adderley	GWR	1963	
Addingham	MR	1965	
Addiscombe	SER	1997	
Adlestrop	GWR	1966	
Admaston Halt	S&WJR	1964	
Adolphus Street (Bradford)	GNR	1867	
Advie (1st)	GNoSR	1868	
Advie (2nd)	GNoSR	1965	
Afon Wen	LNWR/CR	1964	
Agecroft Bridge	MB&BCN&R/L&YR	1861	
Ainderby	NER	1954	
Ainsdale Beach	CLC	1952	
Ainsworth Road Halt	L&YR	1953	
Aintree Central	CLC	1960	
Aintree Racecourse	L&YR	1962	
Airdrie East	CR	1943	
Airdrie Hallcraig Street	NBR	1871	
Airdrie Leaend	BR	1843	
Airdrie North (Commonhead)	NBR	1930	
Airmyn	NER	1964	
Airth	CR	1954	
Akeld	NER	1930	
Akeman Street	GCR	1930	
Albert Road Bridge Halt	L&SWR/LB&SCR Joint	1914	
Albert Road Halt (Plymouth)	L&SWR	1947	
Alberta Place Halt	TVR	1968	
Albion	LNWR	1960	
Alcester	MID	1962	
Aldeburgh	GER	1966	
Aldeby	GER	1959	
Aldridge	MID	1965	
Aldwych	Great Northern, Piccadilly and Brompton Railway	1994	
Alexandra Dock	Liverpool Overhead Railway	1956	
Alexandra Dock	LNWR	1948	
Alexandra Palace	Edgware, Highgate and London Railway	1954	not the existing Alexandra Palace station
Alford	GNS	1950	
Alford Halt	GWR	1962	
Alford Town	GNR	1970	
Algarkirk and Sutterton	GNR	1961	
All Saints (Clevedon)	Weston, Clevedon and Portishead Railway	1940	
All Stretton Halt	Shrewsbury and Hereford Joint Railway	1958	
Allanfearn	Highland Railway	1965	
Allangrange	Highland Railway	1951	
Allendale	NER	1930	
Allerton	LNWR	2005	A new station, Liverpool South Parkway, opened in 2006 on same site
Allerwash	Newcastle and Carlisle Railway	1837	
Allhallows-on-Sea	SR	1961	
Allhallows Colliery	Maryport and Carlisle Railway	1928	approximate date
Alloa	NBR	1968	reopened 2008
Alloa	Alloa Railway	1885	
Alloa Ferry	Stirling & Dunfermline Railway	1852	
Alloa Junction	CAL	1865	
Alloa South	CAL	1885	
Alloway	G&SWR	1930	
Alltddu Halt	GWR	1965	
Allt-y-Graig	LM&SR	1930	
Almeley	GWR	1940	
Almondbank	CAL	1951	
Alne	NER	1958	
Alnwick (1st)	NER	1887	
Alnwick (2nd)	NER	1968	
Alphington Halt	GWR	1958	
Alresford (Hampshire)	LSWR	1973	reopened 1977
Alrewas	LNWR	1965	
Alsager Road	North Staffordshire Railway	1931	
Alsop en le Dale	LNWR	1954	
Alston	NER	1976	
Altcar & Hillhouse	Cheshire Lines Committee	1952	
Altcar Rifle Range	L&YR	1921	
Althorp Park	LNWR	1960	
Altofts	MID	1990	
Alton Heights Junction	Caledonian Railway	1926	approximate date
Alton Park	London and South Western Railway	1939	
Alton Towers	North Staffordshire Railway	1965	
Altrincham	Manchester, South Junction and Altrincham Railway	1881	
Alva	NBR	1954	
Alveley Colliery Halt	Great Western Railway	1963	
Alverstone (Isle of Wight)	IoWC J	1956	
Alverthorpe	GNR	1954	
Alves	Highland Railway	1965	
Alvescot	GWR	1962	
Alyth	CAL	1951	
Alyth Junction	CAL	1967	
Amberswood (Hindley)	Lancashire Union Railway	1872	
Amble	NER	1930	
Amesbury	LSWR	1952	
Amisfield	CAL	1952	
Amlwch	L&NWR	1964	
Ammanford (GWR)	GWR	1958	
Ammanford Colliery Halt	GWR	1958	
Amotherby	NER	1931	
Ampleforth	NER	1950	
Ampress Works Halt	British Railways	1989	
Ampthill	Midland Railway	1959	
Andover Town	L&SWR	1964	
Andoversford	GWR	1962	
Andoversford and Dowdeswell	M&SWJR	1927	
Angarrack	West Cornwall Railway	1853	
Angel Road	Northern and Eastern Railway	2019	
Angerton	NBR	1952	
Anlaby Road (Hull)	NER	1854	
Ann Street Halt	L&NWR	1951	
Annan Shawhill	CAL	1931	
Annbank	GSWR	1951	
Annesley	MID	1953	
Annfield Plain	NER	1955	
Annitsford	NER	1958	
Anston	GCR/MID Joint	1929	
Anstruther (1st)	NBR	1883	
Anstruther (2nd)	NBR	1965	
Apperley Bridge	MID	1965	reopened 2015
Appin	CAL	1966	
Appleby (Lincs)	Great Central Railway	1967	
Appleby East	NER	1962	
Appledore (Devon)	Bideford, Westward Ho! and Appledore Railway	1917	
Appleton	LNWR	1951	
Arbirlot	Dundee and Arbroath Railway	1929	
Arbroath Catherine Street	Arbroath and Forfar Railway	1848	
Arbroath Lady Loan	Dundee and Arbroath Railway	1848	
Arbuckle	Monklands Railway	1862	
Arddleen Halt	Cambrian Railways	1965	
Arden	North British Railway	1930	
Ardeer Platform	Lanarkshire and Ayrshire Railway	1966	
Ardingly	LB&SCR	1963	
Ardleigh	GER	1967	
Ardler	CAL	1956	
Ardley	GWR	1963	
Ardrossan Montgomerie Pier	L&AR	1968	
Ardrossan North	L&AR	1932	
Ardrossan Town	G&SWR	1968	reopened 1987
Ardrossan Winton Pier	G&SWR	1987	
Ardsley	GNR	1964	
Arenig	GWR	1960	
Argoed Halt	LNWR	1960	
Argyle Halt	Swansea Improvements and Tramway Company	1960	
Arkholme for Kirkby Lonsdale	Furness and Midland Joint Railway	1960	
Arkleby	M&C	1852	
Arksey	GNR	1952	
Arkwright Street (Nottingham)	GCR	1969	
Arkwright Town	LD&ECR	1951	
Arlecdon	Cleator & Workington Junction Railway	1917	
Arlesey and Henlow	GNR	1959	reopened 1988
Arley and Fillongley	MID	1960	
Arley	Great Western Railway	1963	since reopened by Severn Valley Railway
Armadale	NBR	1956	reopened 2011
Armathwaite	MID	1970	reopened 1986
Armitage	LNWR	1960	
Armley Canal Road	MID	1965	
Armley Moor	GNR	1966	
Arnage	GNS	1965	
Arpley (Warrington)	St Helens Railway	1958	
Arthington (1st)	NER	1865	
Arthington (2nd)	NER	1965	
Arthog	Cambrian Railways	1965	
Arundel and Littlehampton	LB&SCR	1863	
Ascot West Race Platform	LSWR	1965	
Asfordby	MID	1951	
Ash Green Halt	LSWR	1937	
Ash Street (Southport)	L&YR	1902	
Ash Town	East Kent Light Railway	1948	
Ashbourne (1st)	LNWR/NS Joint	1899	
Ashbourne (2nd)	LNWR/NS Joint	1954	
Ashburton	GWR	1958	
Ashbury	LSWR	1966	
Ashby Magna	GCR	1969	
Ashby-de-la-Zouch	MID	1964	
Ashchurch	MID	1971	reopened 1997
Ashcombe Road (Weston-Super-Mare)	Weston, Clevedon and Portishead Railway	1940	
Ashcott	Somerset and Dorset Joint Railway	1966	
Ashdon Halt	GER	1964	
Ashey	Isle of Wight Central Railway	1966	reopened by Isle Of Wight Steam Railway
Ashey Racecourse	Isle of Wight Central Railway	1929	
Ashford Bowdler	Shrewsbury and Hereford Railway	1855	
Ashford West	London, Chatham and Dover Railway	1899	closed to passengers
Ashington	NER	1964	Re-opened 2024
Ashington Colliery Junction	NER	1878	
Ashleigh Road	Swansea and Mumbles Railway	1960	
Ashley and Weston	LNWR	1951	
Ashley Heath Halt	SR	1964	
Ashley Hill	GWR	1964	Re-opened 2024 as Ashley Down
Ashover Butts	Ashover Light Railway	1936	
Ashperton	GWR	1965	
Ashton (Devon)	GWR	1958	
Ashton (Bristol)	Bristol and Exeter Railway	1856	
Ashton Gate	GWR	1964	
Ashton Hall (private)	LNWR	1930	
Ashton Moss	Oldham, Ashton and Guide Bridge Junction Railway	1862	
Ashton-in-Makerfield	GCR	1952	
Ashton (Oldham Road)	Oldham, Ashton and Guide Bridge Junction Railway	1959	
Ashton-under-Hill	MID	1963	
Ashton Park Parade (Ashton-under-Lyne)	Manchester, Sheffield and Lincolnshire Railway	1956	
Ashwater	LSWR	1966	
Ashwell	MID	1966	
Ashwellthorpe (Norfolk)	GER	1939	
Askern	L&YR	1947	
Askrigg	NER	1954	
Aspall and Thorndon	Mid-Suffolk Light Railway	1952	
Astley	LNWR	1956	
Astley Bridge	L&YR	1879	
Aston Botterell	Cleobury Mortimer and Ditton Priors Light Railway	1938	
Aston Cantlow Halt	GWR	1939	
Aston Rowant	GWR	1957	
Aston-by-Stone	North Staffordshire Railway	1947	
Astwood Halt	GWR	1939	
Aswarby and Scredington	GNR	1930	
Athelney	GWR	1964	
Atherleigh	LMS	1954	
Atherton Bag Lane	LNWR	1954	
Attercliffe	Manchester, Sheffield and Lincolnshire Railway	1927	
Attercliffe Road	Midland Railway	1995	
Attimore Hall Halt	GNR	1905	
Attlebridge	Midland and Great Northern Joint Railway	1959	
Auchendinny	NBR	1951	
Auchengray	CAL	1966	
Auchenheath	CAL	1951	
Auchenmade	L&AW	1932	
Auchincruive	GSWR	1951	
Auchindachy	GNSR	1968	
Auchlochan Platform	CAL	1965	
Auchmacoy	GNSR	1932	
Auchnagatt	GNSR	1965	
Auchterarder	CAL	1956	
Auchterhouse (1st)	CAL	1860	
Auchterhouse (2nd)	CAL	1955	
Auchterless	GNSR	1951	
Auchtermuchty	NBR	1950	
Audenshaw (1st)	LNWR	1905	
Audenshaw (2nd former Hooley Hill)	LNWR	1950	
Audlem	GWR	1963	
Audley and Bignall End	North Staffordshire Railway	1931	
Auldbar Road	CAL	1956	
Auldearn	Highland Railway	1960	
Auldgirth	GSWR	1952	
Aultmore	Highland Railway	1915	
Authorpe	GNR	1961	
Aviemore (Speyside)	Strathspey Railway	1998	
Avoch	Highland Railway	1951	
Avonbridge	NBR	1930	
Avon Lodge	Ringwood, Christchurch and Bournemouth Railway	1935	
Avonbridge	North British Railway	1930	
Avonmouth (BPRP)	Clifton Extension Railway	1902	remained open until 1903 for workmen
Avonmouth Docks	GWR	1915	
Avonwick	GWR	1963	
Awre for Blakeney	GWR	1959	
Awsworth	GNR	1964	
Axbridge	GWR	1963	
Aycliffe	NER	1953	
Aylesbury (Brook Street)	Metropolitan Railway	1894	
Aylesbury High Street (1st)	LNWR	1889	
Aylesbury High Street (2nd)	LNWR	1953	
Aylsham North	Midland and Great Northern Joint Railway	1959	
Aylsham South	GER	1952	
Aynho	GWR	1964	
Aynho Park Platform	GWR	1963	
Ayot	GNR	1949	
Ayr – original station or Ayr North	Glasgow & South Western Railway	1857	
Aysgarth	NER	1954	
Ayton	NBR	1962	
