= Arden station =

Arden station may refer to:

- Arden railway station, Denmark, a railway station in North Jutland, Denmark
- Arden railway station, Melbourne, a railway station in Victoria, Australia
- Arden railway station, Scotland, a disused railway station in Falkirk, Scotland
