= Whiterigg railway station =

Disused railway station in Maddiston, Falkirk

Coordinates: 55.885746°N 3.952540°W

Whiterigg

General information
- Location: Maddiston, Stirlingshire; Scotland
- Platforms: 2

Other information
- Status: Disused

History
- Original company: Monkland Railways
- Pre-grouping: North British Railway
- Post-grouping: London and North Eastern Railway

Key dates
- November 1862: Opened
- 1 May 1930: Closed
Location

Whiterigg railway station served the village of Maddiston, North Lanarkshire, Scotland, from 1862 to 1930 on the Slamannan Railway.

== History ==
The station was opened in November 1862 by the Monkland Railways. It replaced Arbuckle, which was to the east. The station closed on 1 May 1930.

Preceding station	Disused railways	Following station
Arden; Line and station closed	Monkland Railways; Slamannan Railway	Terminus
