= Glenellrig railway station =

Short-lived railway station in Slamannan, Falkirk

Coordinates: 55.940501°N 3.782222°W

Glenellrig

General information
- Location: Slamannan, Falkirk; Scotland
- Platforms: 1

Other information
- Status: Disused

History
- Original company: Slamannan Railway
- Pre-grouping: Monkland Railways

Key dates
- July 1848: Opened
- 1 January 1850: Closed
Location

Glenellrig railway station served the village of Slamannan, Falkirk, Scotland, from 1848 to 1850 on the Slamannan Railway.

== History ==
The station was opened in July 1848 by the Slamannan Railway. It was a short lived station, closing on 1 January 1850.

Preceding station	Disused railways	Following station
Avonbridge; Line and station closed	Slamannan Railway	Slamannan; Line and station closed
