= Slamannan railway station =

Disused railway station in Slamannan, Falkirk

Slamannan
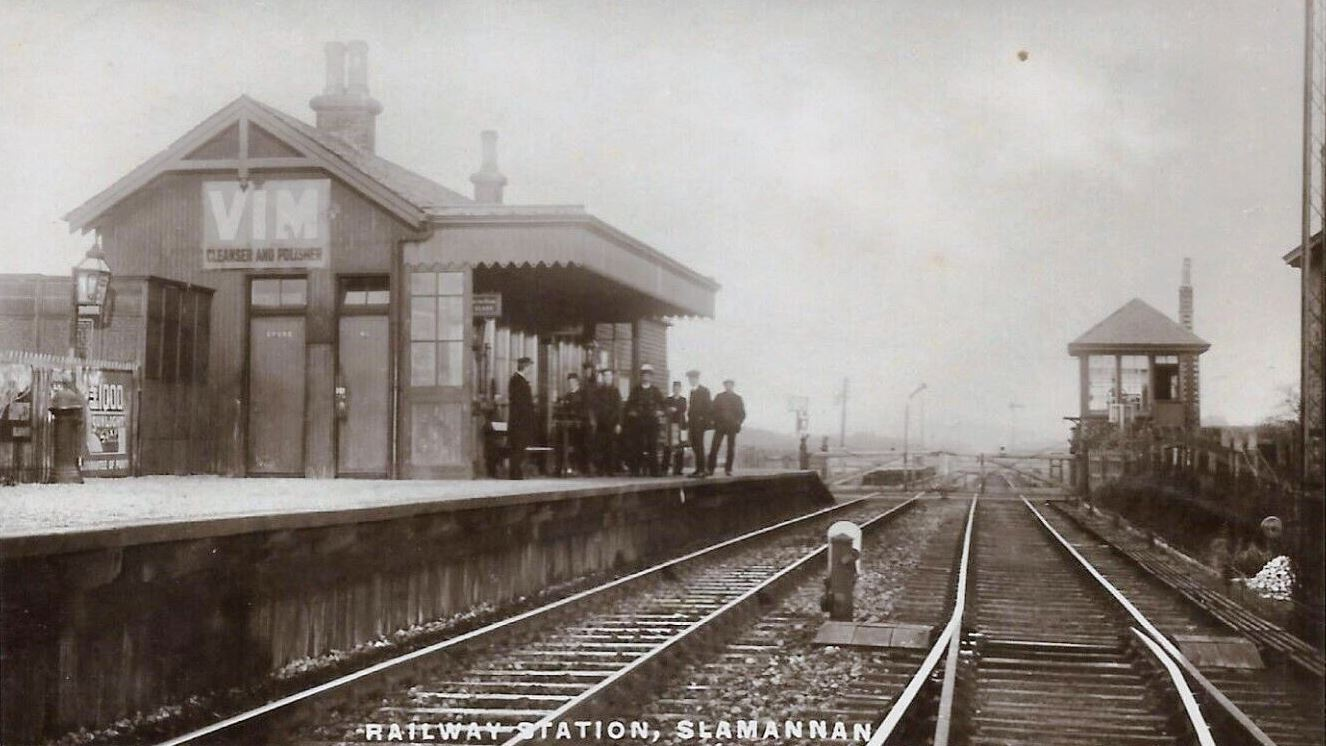

General information
- Location: Slamannan, Falkirk; Scotland
- Coordinates: 55.9308°N 3.8294°W
- Grid reference: NS858723
- Platforms: 1

Other information
- Status: Disused

History
- Original company: Slamannan Railway
- Pre-grouping: Monkland Railways; North British Railway
- Post-grouping: London and North Eastern Railway

Key dates
- 5 August 1840: Opened
- 1 May 1930: Closed
Location

Slamannan railway station served the village of Slamannan, Falkirk, Scotland, from 1840 to 1930 on the Slamannan Railway.

== History ==
The station was opened on 5 August 1840 by the Slamannan Railway. To the west was Binniehall Coke Ovens, as well as its mines, and to the east was Balquhatstone and their mines. The first station was basic; it only had a small timber building on its single platform and was situated to the west of the level crossing. This site later closed and was relocated to the east of the level crossing. It had a goods yard, which also had a goods shed, to the west and a signal box to the south. This station closed and was replaced by a third site. This had a goods yard to the north and a timber station building on its platform. It closed on 1 May 1930.

Preceding station	Disused railways	Following station
Glenellrig; Line and station closed	Slamannan Railway	Longriggend; Line and station closed
