= Blackston Junction railway station =

Disused railway station in Blackston, Falkirk

Blackston Junction
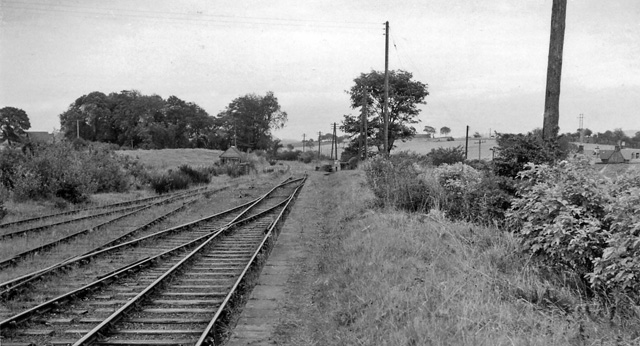
- The station in 1962

General information
- Location: Blackston, Falkirk; Scotland
- Coordinates: 55.9381°N 3.7298°W
- Grid reference: NS920730
- Platforms: 1

Other information
- Status: Disused

History
- Original company: Monkland Railways
- Pre-grouping: North British Railway
- Post-grouping: London and North Eastern Railway

Key dates
- January 1863: Opened
- 1 May 1930: Closed to passengers
- 1963: Closed to goods
Location

Blackston Junction railway station served the area of Blackston, Falkirk, Scotland, from 1863 to 1963 on the Slamannan Railway.

== History ==
The station first appeared Bradshaw in January 1863 and was opened by the Monkland Railways. It had a lot of different names; it was known as Blackstone Junction in the Monkland Railways timetable on 1 March 1865, it was renamed from Blackston to Blackston Junction in the 1866 North British Railway timetables, renamed Blackston in Bradshaw in 1890, Blackstone in the 1883 and Blackston in the 1890 editions of the handbook of stations. The handbook leaflet in 1925 amended the name to Blackston Junction in 1925 but it was still known as Blackston in Bradshaw. To the northwest was Blackston Junction Yard and to the southeast was the signal box, which opened in 1892. The station closed to passengers on 1 May 1930 and closed to goods in 1963.

Preceding station	Disused railways	Following station
Westfield; Line and station closed	Monkland Railways; Slamannan Railway	Avonbridge; Line and station closed
