= Kerr Bovell =

Senior British colonial police officer (1913–1973)

Sir Conrad Swire Kerr Bovell CMG
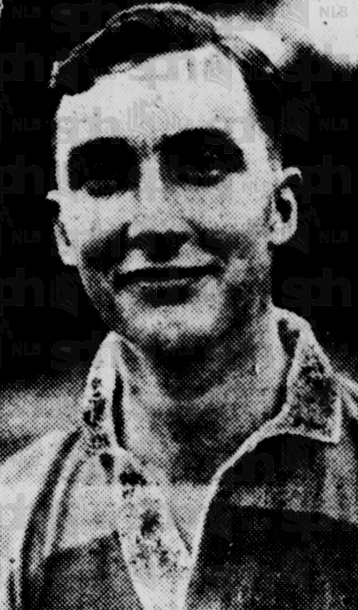
- Bovell in 1935
- Born: 9 September 1913; St Leonards-on-Sea,
- Died: 29 September 1973 (aged 60); Radley
- Education: Bradfield College
- Occupation: Senior colonial police officer
- Children: 2 daughters

Sir Conrad Swire Kerr Bovell (9 September 1913 – 29 September 1973) was a senior British colonial police officer who served as Inspector General of Police of the Federation of Nigeria from 1956 to 1962.

== Early life and education ==
Bovell was born on 9 September 1913 at St Leonards-on-Sea, Sussex, the son of Capt. C. W. K. Bovell (MBE) of the Colonial Police Service and Edith Bovell (née Haughton) of Worthing. He was educated at Bradfield College, Berkshire.

== Career ==
Bovell began his career teaching in preparatory schools. In 1934, he left the profession and joined the Colonial Police Service as a Probationary Assistant Commissioner of Police, Federated Malay States Police, and was attached to the police station in Kuala Lumpur. In the following year, he was appointed to act as Assistant Commissioner of Police. In 1940, he was transferred to Kulim as Officer Superintending Police Circle. From 1942 to 1945, he was interned by the Japanese army in Changi Prison, Singapore. After the Second World War, he returned to Malaya where he served in various posts including Officer-in-Charge at Segamat and Johore Bahru. He resigned from the Federation police service in 1956 with the rank of Deputy Police Commissioner, Federated Malay States.

After leaving Malaya, Bovell served as Inspector-General of Police of the Federation of Nigeria from 1956 until his retirement from the Colonial Police Service in 1962. In his final year, he had to tackle outbreaks of violence between political factions in Western Nigeria known as Operation Wetie. He is credited with the introduction a programme of Nigerianisation in the officer ranks of the police force through rapid promotion which led to the appointment of the first indigenous Inspector-General of Police in 1964.

From 1963 to 1968, he was employed as bursar of Worksop College, Nottinghamshire, and from 1968 to 1973, as bursar of Radley College, Berkshire.

== Personal life and death ==
Bovell married Ethne Perrin in 1941 and they had two daughters. He was a keen sportsman, playing cricket, rugby and football for state and club teams in Malaya.

Bovell died at Radley, Berkshire on 29 September 1973, aged 60.

== Honours ==
Bovill was awarded the Colonial Police Medal and the Queen's Police Medal. He was appointed Companion of the Order of St Michael and St George (CMG) in the 1958 New Year Honours. He was created a Knight Bachelor in the 1961 New Year Honours.
