= Longriggend railway station =

Former railway station in Scotland

Longriggend

General information
- Location: Longriggend, North Lanarkshire; Scotland
- Coordinates: 55.9094°N 3.8887°W

Other information
- Status: Disused

History
- Original company: Slamannan Railway
- Pre-grouping: North British Railway
- Post-grouping: LNER

Key dates
- 31 August 1840: Opened
- 1 May 1930: Closed
Location

Longriggend railway station was a railway station serving the village of Longriggend, North Lanarkshire, Scotland. The station was part of the Slamannan Railway which amalgamated with several other local railways to form the Monkland Railways.

== History ==
The station opened in 1840 when the Slamannan Railway opened and closed to passengers on 1 May 1930.

Preceding station	Historical railways	Following station
Slamannan; Line and station closed	North British Railway; Slamannan Railway	Arden; Line and station closed
