= Aberford railway station =

Disused railway station in Aberford, West Yorkshire, England

Aberford

General information
- Location: Aberford, City of Leeds; England
- Coordinates: 53.826°N 1.343°W
- Grid reference: SE434368
- Platforms: 2

Other information
- Status: Disused

History
- Original company: Aberford Railway
- Pre-grouping: Aberford Railway

Key dates
- 25 February 1837: Opened
- March 1924: Closed
Location

Aberford railway station served the village of Aberford, West Yorkshire, England, from 1837 to 1924 on the Aberford Railway.

== History ==
The station opened on 25 February 1837 by the Aberford Railway. Early services were carried by horse and wagon, also known as the 'High Flyer'. When George Hudson removed the passenger services on the Leeds and Selby Railway, horse-drawn buses were used instead to get to Leeds, forcing the passenger services to be withdrawn on the line in 1840. When Hudson lost power in 1850, the services resumed. The first steam locomotive was used on the line in 1870. The station closed in March 1924.

Preceding station	Disused railways	Following station
Terminus	Aberford Railway	Garforth; Line and station closed
