= Upton Magna railway station =

Former railway station in Shropshire, England

Upton Magna

General information
- Location: Upton Magna, Shropshire; England
- Coordinates: 52.7025°N 2.6597°W
- Grid reference: SJ554118
- Platforms: 2

Other information
- Status: Disused

History
- Original company: Shrewsbury and Wellington Joint Railway
- Pre-grouping: LNWR and GWR joint
- Post-grouping: LMS and GWR joint

Key dates
- 1 June 1849: Opened
- 7 September 1964: Closed
Location

Upton Magna railway station was a station in Upton Magna, Shropshire, England.

The station was opened on 1 June 1849 by the Shrewsbury and Wellington Joint Railway, which was run jointly by the London and North Western Railway and the Great Western Railway (who had leased/acquired the companies that had previously built the lines from Stafford to Wellington and Shrewsbury to Wolverhampton respectively). Initially the station had no platforms at track level, nor any buildings on the westbound side - these were subsequently added later. Goods sidings, a loop and a signal box were provided on the southbound side of the line by 1895. Passenger trains from the station ran to Shrewsbury westbound and to either Wolverhampton Low Level or Birmingham Snow Hill (GWR) eastbound prior to nationalisation in 1948.

The station closed to goods traffic on 4 May 1964 and completely a few months later on 7 September. The buildings and platforms were swiftly demolished and the sidings removed, though the goods loop and signal box survived until May 1967.

The station house still stands some distance from the lineside in 2016 (now in private residential use), but all other traces of the station have disappeared.

Preceding station	Disused railways	Following station
Abbey Foregate; Line open, station closed	LNWR and GWR joint Shrewsbury and Wellington Joint Railway	Walcot; Line open, station closed
