= Walcot railway station =

Former railway station in Shropshire, England

Walcot

General information
- Location: Walcot, Shropshire; England
- Coordinates: 52.7032°N 2.6021°W
- Grid reference: SJ594118
- Platforms: 2

Other information
- Status: Disused

History
- Original company: Shrewsbury and Wellington Joint Railway
- Pre-grouping: LNWR and GWR joint
- Post-grouping: LMS and GWR joint

Key dates
- 1 June 1849: Opened
- 7 September 1964: Closed
Location

Walcot railway station was a station in Walcot, Shropshire, England. The station was sited on the Wolverhampton to Shrewsbury line west of Wellington (Shropshire) and opened on 1 June 1849. It closed on 7 September 1964, along with the other intermediate stations on this stretch of line. The station was demolished after closure and no trace now remains.

Preceding station	Disused railways	Following station
Upton Magna; Line open, station closed	LNWR and GWR joint Shrewsbury and Wellington Joint Railway	Admaston; Line open, station closed
