= Arbuckle railway station =

Disused railway station in Scotland

Arbuckle

General information
- Location: North Lanarkshire; Scotland
- Coordinates: 55.89045°N 3.94612°W
- Platforms: ?

Other information
- Status: Disused

History
- Original company: Slamannan Railway
- Pre-grouping: Slamannan Railway and Ballochney Railway End on Junction

Key dates
- 31 August 1840: Station opens
- October 1862: Station closes
Location

Arbuckle railway station served the village of Arbuckle in the Scottish county of North Lanarkshire. The station was the meeting point of two early railway companies.

== History ==
The station was the meeting point of the two pioneer railways, the Slamannan Railway and the Ballochney Railway, and joined the Monklands Railway when they amalgamated to form it in 1848. The Monklands railway was in 1865 absorbed by the Edinburgh and Glasgow Railway, joining the North British Railway a day later. By the time of these events however the station had closed, in 1862.

Preceding station	Historical railways	Following station
Rawyards; Ballochney Railway	Slamannan Railway	Whiterigg; Line and station closed
