= Gogarth railway station =

Former railway station in Wales

Coordinates: 52.5608°N 3.9610°W

Gogarth
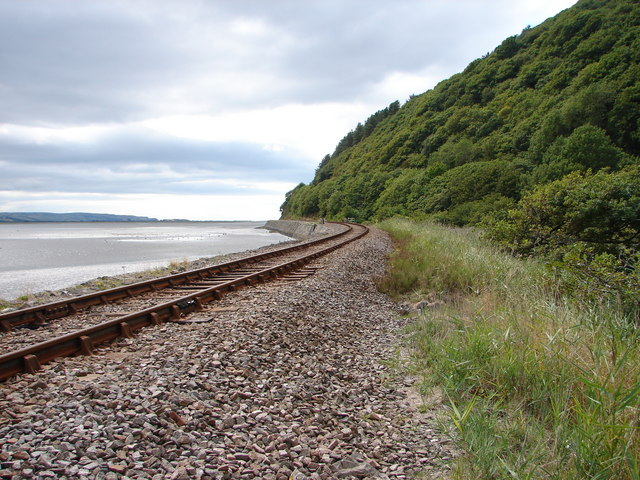

General information
- Location: Eglwys Fach, Merionethshire; Wales
- Platforms: 1

Other information
- Status: Disused

History
- Original company: Great Western Railway

Key dates
- 9 July 1923: Station opens as Gogarth Halt
- 6 May 1968: Station renamed Gogarth
- 14 May 1984: Last Train
- 30 September 1985: Station closes (officially)
Location

Gogarth railway station served a sparsely populated area on the north shore of the Dyfi estuary in the Welsh county of Merionethshire.

== History ==
Opened by the Great Western Railway on 9 July 1923 and originally named Gogarth Halt, it had a short wooden platform with no shelter. The station passed on to the London Midland Region of British Railways on nationalisation in 1948. Renamed Gogarth on 6 May 1968, services were suspended from 14 May 1984 due to the deteriorating structural condition of the platform and cost of repairs needed. The station was officially closed by the British Railways Board on 30 September 1985.

== The site today ==
Trains on the Cambrian Line pass the site of the former halt but there is no trace of its existence. Only the access path leading from a lay-by on the A493 road exists.

== Notes ==
Preceding station	Historical railways	Following station
Dovey Junction; Line and station open	Great Western Railway	Abertafol Halt; Line open, station closed
