= Culham railway station =

Railway station in Oxfordshire, England

Coordinates: 51.654°N 1.237°W

Culham
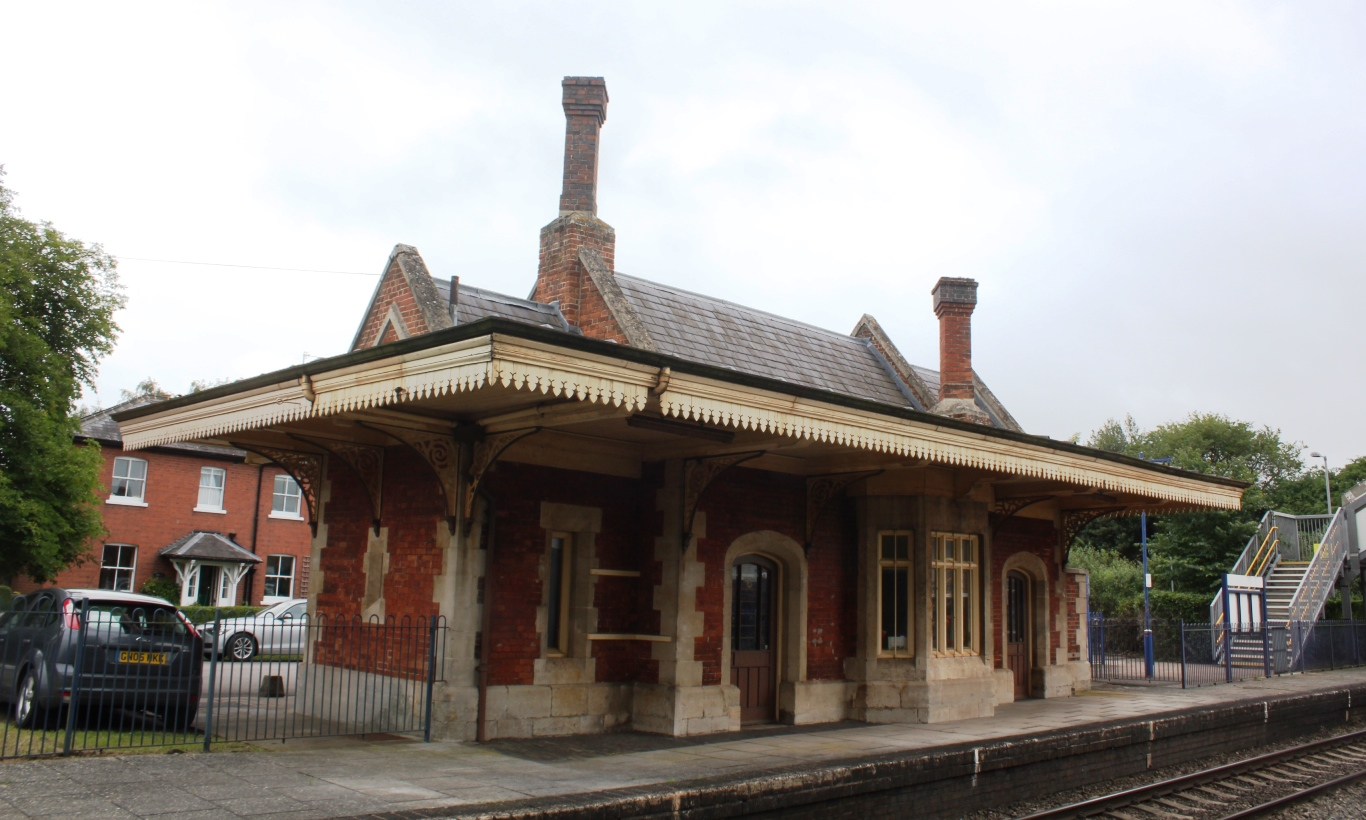

General information
- Location: Culham, South Oxfordshire; England
- Grid reference: SU529953
- Manager: Great Western Railway
- Platforms: 2

Other information
- Station code: CUM
- Classification: DfT category F1

History
- Opened: 1844
- Original company: Great Western Railway
- Pre-grouping: GWR
- Post-grouping: GWR

Passengers
- 2020/21: ▼21,586
- 2021/22: ▲60,142
- 2022/23: ▲80,752
- 2023/24: ▼72,232
- 2024/25: ▲0.114 million
Location
Notes
- Passenger statistics from the Office of Rail and Road

Culham railway station serves the village of Culham in Oxfordshire, England. It is on the Cherwell Valley Line between Didcot Parkway and Banbury, 56 miles 17 chains (90.5 km) from London Paddington. It is served by local train services provided by Great Western Railway.

The station is just off the A415 road, between the villages of Culham and Clifton Hampden.

It is close to Culham Science Centre, an 80-hectare (200-acre) scientific research site housing two nuclear fusion experiments: JET and MAST. The Science Centre was built on the site of RNAS Culham (HMS Hornbill), a World War II airfield.

== History ==
The Great Western Railway opened the station on the Didcot – Oxford line as Abingdon Road on 12 June 1844, although architectural drawings exist in the National Rail Corporate archive bearing the pre-construction name of Dorchester Road. Its name was changed by the GWR to Culham, on 2 June 1856, on the opening of the branch from Abingdon Junction to Abingdon.

The original station building (no longer in railway use) is in the Tudor Revival architecture of Isambard Kingdom Brunel and is a Grade II* listed building.

The name Abingdon Road was later re-used for an entirely different station about 5.5 miles (9 km) to the north, Abingdon Road Halt, opened in 1908.

== Services ==
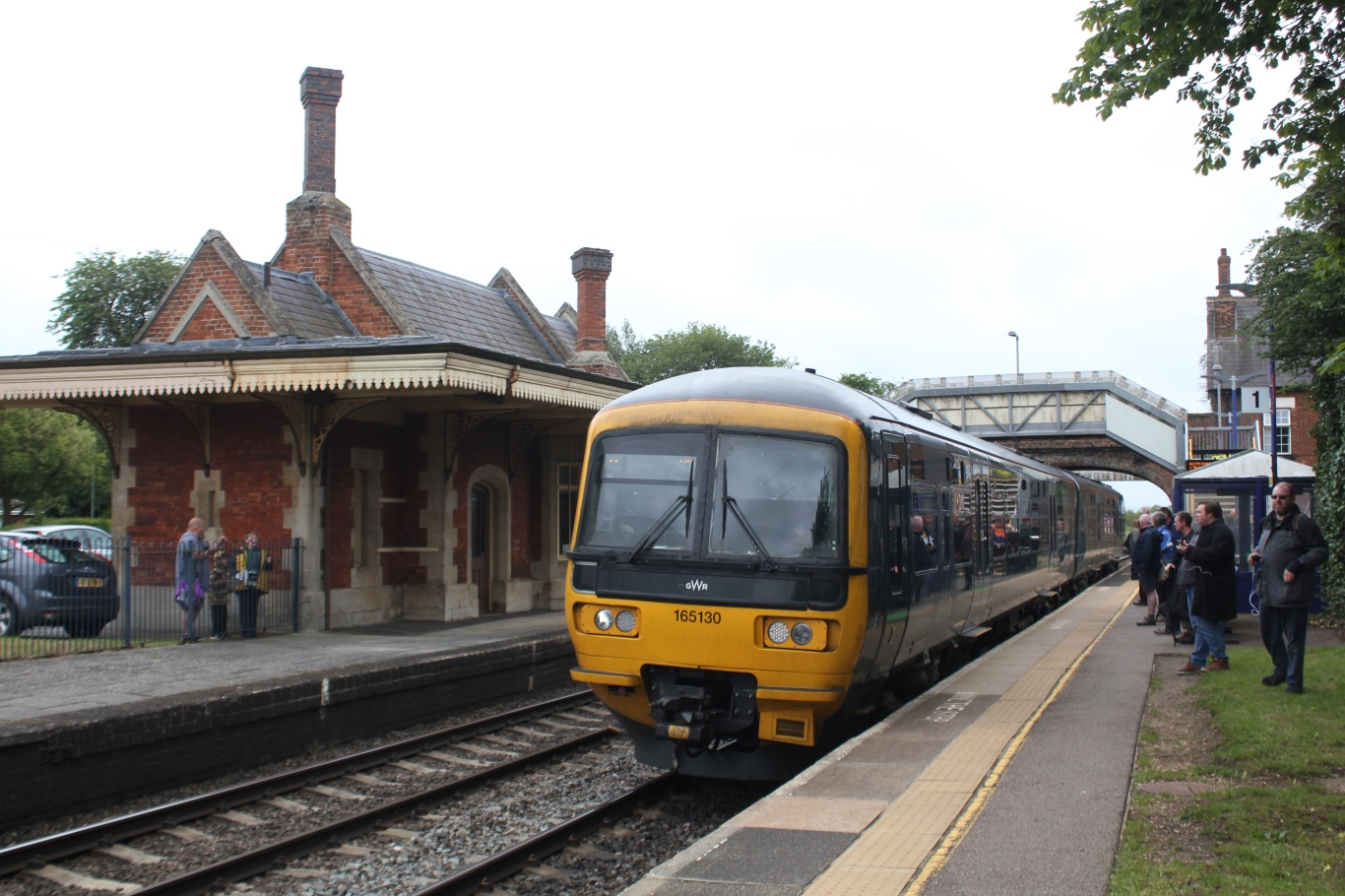
A Class 165 with a GWR service to Oxford

All services at Culham are operated by Great Western Railway.

The typical off-peak service is one train per hour in each direction between Didcot Parkway and Oxford, with alternate trains continuing beyond Oxford to and from Banbury every two hours. Additional services call at the station during the peak hours.

No services call at the station on Sundays.

Preceding station	National Rail	Following station
Appleford	Great Western Railway Cherwell Valley Line Monday-Saturday only	Radley
Disused railways
Appleford	Great Western Railway Cherwell Valley Line	Abingdon Junction
