= Abingdon Junction railway station =

Former railway station in Oxfordshire, England

Coordinates: 51.67383°N 1.24218°W

Abingdon Junction

General information
- Location: near Radley, Vale of White Horse, Oxfordshire; England
- Grid reference: SU525975
- Platforms: 2

Other information
- Status: Disused

History
- Original company: Abingdon Railway Company

Key dates
- 2 June 1856: Opened
- 8 September 1873: Closed
Location

Abingdon Junction railway station was a junction station for the branch line to Abingdon-on-Thames. It was opened by the Abingdon Railway Company on 2 June 1856 along with the branch, and was subsequently closed and replaced by Radley railway station on 8 September 1873. Radley station was in a more convenient place for access. At the same time as the station's opening, the next station to the south, formerly known as Abingdon Road was renamed Culham.

In 1837 the first Bill for a railway to Abingdon was laid before Parliament; it would have brought a direct line from Didcot to Oxford through the town. The House of Commons passed the Bill, but the Lords rejected it. The Bill for the Oxford line was revived in the following year, but so strong was the opposition of Mr. Duffield, Abingdon's M.P., that the proposed line was forced to by-pass Abingdon; it eventually opened on 12 June 1844 and ran no nearer to Abingdon than the village of Radley, some two miles (3.2 km) to the east.

Located at the point where the branch diverges from the main line, Abingdon Junction was provided purely for interchange for services to Oxford, Culham and Didcot and was not shown in timetables. No proper road access to the station was provided and only modest passenger facilities were afforded consisting of two facing wooden platforms with a small building constructed on the up main side and a run-around loop for branch services and connections with the main line.

Following the conversion of the branch to standard gauge in November 1872, works began to extend the line a further 3/4 mile (1.2 km) northwards alongside the main line to reach a new station at Radley where it terminated in a bay platform on the station's west side. The station building from Abingdon Junction was transported to Radley, where it was sited just south of the road bridge, most likely on the down side. It remained there until well into British Railways days and was used by gangers and platelayers. The remains of Abingdon Junction survived for several years before their demolition, so that the only trace of the station today is the widened formation to the west of the main line before the Abingdon branch curved away.

Preceding station	Historical railways	Following station
Oxford	Great Western Railway; Cherwell Valley Line	Culham
	Disused railways	
Abingdon	Abingdon Railway Company; Abingdon Branch Line	Terminus

== Sources ==
- Butt, R.V.J. (1995). The Directory of Railway Stations. Yeovil: Patrick Stephens Ltd. ISBN 1-85260-508-1. R508.
- Clinker, C.R. (October 1978). Clinker's Register of Closed Passenger Stations and Goods Depots in England, Scotland and Wales 1830-1977. Bristol: Avon-AngliA Publications & Services. ISBN 0-905466-19-5.
- MacDermot, E.T. (1927). "Chapter IX Hard Times". History of the Great Western Railway. Vol. I Part I (1st ed.). Paddington: Great Western Railway.
- Simpson, Bill (2001). A History of the Railways in Oxfordshire; Part 2: The South. Witney, Oxon: Lamplight Publications. ISBN 978-1-899246-06-9.
- Trippett, Nigel; de Courtais, Nicholas (1985). The Abingdon Branch. Upper Bucklebury, Berks.: Wild Swan Publications Ltd. ISBN 0-906867-29-0.
