= Radley railway station =

Railway station in Oxfordshire, England

Coordinates: 51.686°N 1.240°W

Radley
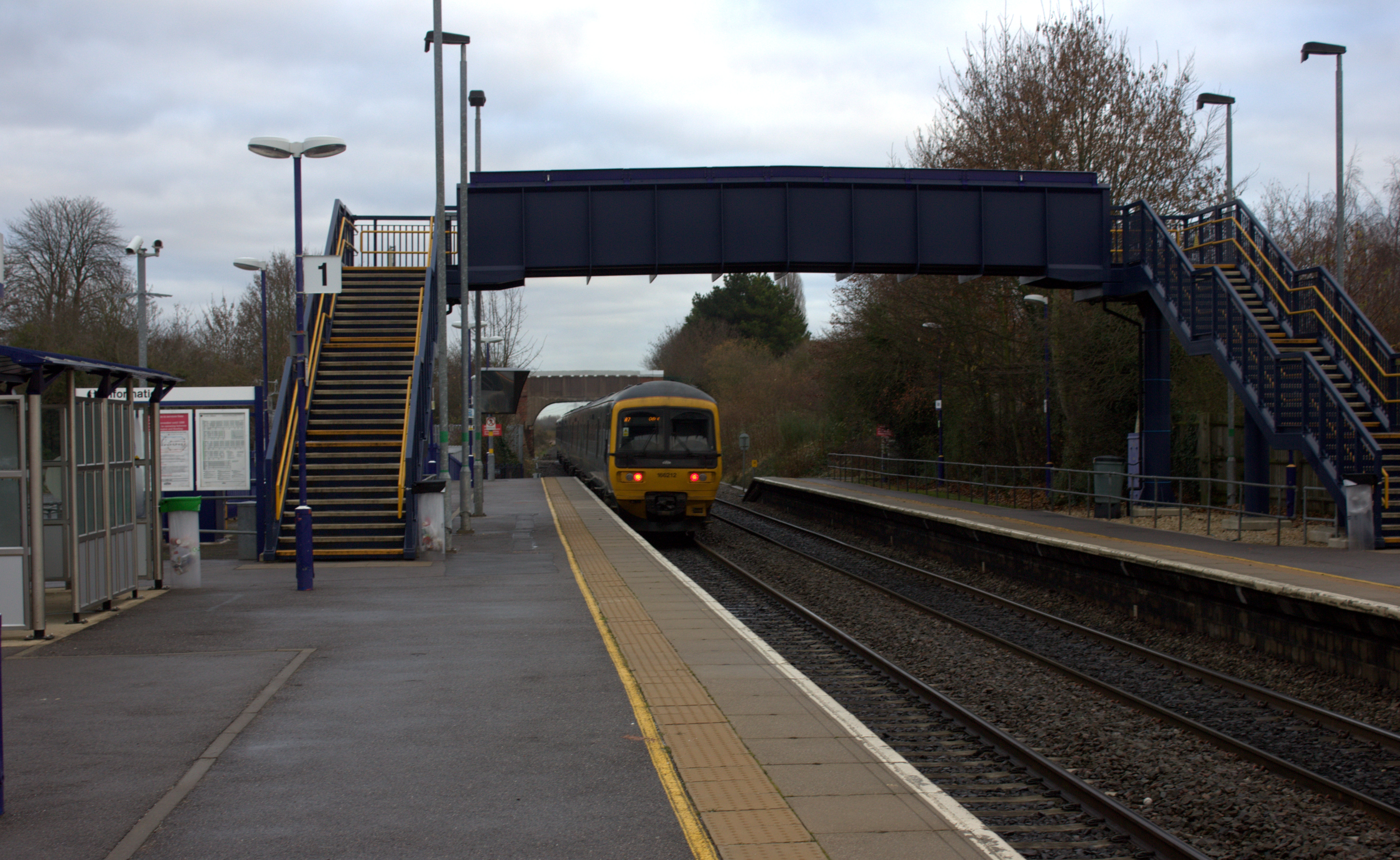

General information
- Location: Radley, Vale of White Horse; England
- Grid reference: SU526988
- Manager: Great Western Railway
- Platforms: 2

Other information
- Station code: RAD
- Classification: DfT category F1

History
- Opened: 8 September 1873
- Original company: Great Western Railway
- Pre-grouping: GWR
- Post-grouping: GWR

Passengers
- 2020/21: ▼20,830
- 2021/22: ▲69,982
- 2022/23: ▲0.102 million
- 2023/24: ▼91,052
- 2024/25: ▲0.132 million
Location
Notes
- Passenger statistics from the Office of Rail and Road

Radley railway station serves the villages of Radley and Lower Radley, as well as the town of Abingdon, in Oxfordshire, England. It is on the Cherwell Valley Line between Culham and Oxford, 58 miles 35 chains (94 km) measured from London Paddington.

== History ==
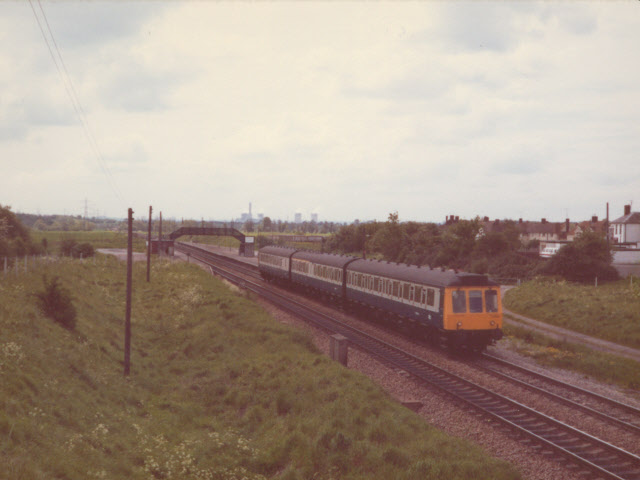
The station seen in 1981

The station was formerly a junction station for a branch to the adjacent town of Abingdon. Opened on 8 September 1873 by the Great Western Railway, it replaced the original interchange, Abingdon Junction, opened in 1856. The branch line to Abingdon was closed to passengers by the British Railways Board in 1963. The branch continued to be used by freight trains (notably for MG Cars) and sporadic passenger excursions, the last of which took place in June 1984. It was also sometimes pressed into service as an overnight stabling point for the Royal Train during royal visits to Oxfordshire, in connection with which the train is known to have stopped at the station on at least one occasion.

== Facilities ==
The station was renovated during 2008, with a new footbridge, shelters, a new car park and increased cycle storage. The station also has a ticket machine and help points.

== Passenger volume ==
In recent years passenger traffic at Radley has grown rapidly. In the five years between 2005 and 2010, the number of passengers using the station increased by 38%.

Passenger Volume at Radley
	2002–03	2004–05	2005–06	2006–07	2007–08	2008–09	2009–10	2010–11	2011–12	2012–13	2013–14	2014–15	2015–16	2016–17	2017–18	2018–19	2019–20	2020–21	2021–22	2022–23
Entries and exits	55,824	54,153	57,651	56,860	66,018	74,514	74,820	84,804	98,846	114,766	118,868	138,896	145,904	145,348	141,786	129,982	135,780	20,830	69,982	102,132

The statistics cover twelve month periods that start in April.

== Services ==
All services at Radley are operated by Great Western Railway.

The typical off-peak service is one train per hour in each direction between Didcot Parkway and Oxford, with alternate trains continuing beyond Oxford to and from Banbury every two hours. Additional services call at the station during the peak hours. On Sundays, the station is served by hourly intercity services between London Paddington and Oxford with some services continuing to and from Worcester Foregate Street, Great Malvern and Hereford.

Preceding station	National Rail	Following station
Culham	Great Western Railway Cherwell Valley Line	Oxford
Disused railways
Abingdon Road Halt	Great Western Railway Cherwell Valley Line	Abingdon

== Bibliography ==
- Quick, Michael (2023) [2001]. Railway passenger stations in Great Britain: a chronology (PDF). version 5.05. Railway & Canal Historical Society.
