= Allerwash railway station =

Short-lived railway station in Allerwash, Northumberland

Allerwash

General information
- Location: Allerwash, Northumberland; England
- Coordinates: 54.994°N 2.206°W
- Platforms: 2

Other information
- Status: Disused

History
- Original company: Newcastle and Carlisle Railway
- Pre-grouping: Newcastle and Carlisle Railway

Key dates
- 28 June 1836: Opened
- January 1837: Closed
Location

Allerwash railway station served the hamlet of Allerwash, Northumberland, England from 1836 to 1837 on the Newcastle and Carlisle Railway.

== History ==
The station opened on 28 June 1836 by the Newcastle and Carlisle Railway. It was a short-lived station that was only open for 7 months, closing in early January 1837.

Preceding station	Disused railways	Following station
Haydon Bridge; Line and station open	Newcastle and Carlisle Railway	Fourstones; Line open, station closed
