= Abertafol railway station =

Disused railway station in Torfaen, Wales

Coordinates: 52.55283°N 3.99683°W

Abertafol

General information
- Location: Aber-Tafol, Gwynedd; Wales
- Line: Cambrian Line
- Platforms: 1

Other information
- Status: Disused

History
- Original company: Great Western Railway
- Post-grouping: Great Western Railway

Key dates
- 18 March 1935: Station opens as Abertafol Halt
- 6 May 1968: Station renamed Abertafol
- 14 May 1984: Last Train
- 30 September 1985: Station closes (officially)
Location

Abertafol railway station was a halt located on the north shore of the Dyfi estuary in the old Welsh county of Merionethshire (south Gwynedd).

== History ==
Opened by the Great Western Railway on 18 March 1935 and originally named Abertafol Halt, the station passed on to the Western Region of British Railways on nationalisation in 1948. Renamed Abertafol on 6 May 1968, services were suspended from 14 May 1984 due to the deteriorating structural condition of the platform and cost of repairs needed. The station was officially closed by the British Railways Board on 30 September 1985.

== The site today ==
Trains on the Cambrian Line pass the site of the former halt. There are no remains of the wooden platform to be seen today. Only the access steps down the cliff from the A493 road are left.

== Notes ==
Preceding station	Historical railways	Following station
Gogarth; Line open, station closed	Great Western Railway	Penhelig Halt; Line and station open
