= Abertysswg railway station =

Disused railway station in Abertysswg, Caerphilly

Coordinates: 51°44′26.2″N 3°15′32.4″W

Abertysswg

General information
- Location: Abertysswg, Caerphilly; Wales
- Platforms: 1

Other information
- Status: Disused

History
- Original company: Brecon and Merthyr Tydfil Junction Railway
- Pre-grouping: Brecon and Merthyr Tydfil Junction Railway
- Post-grouping: Great Western Railway

Key dates
- 1905: Station opens
- 14 April 1930: Station closes
Location

Abertysswg railway station was a station which served Abertysswg, in the Welsh county of Glamorgan. It was served by trains on the line from Pengam (Mon) to Rhymney Lower & Pontlottyn.

== History ==
Opened by the Brecon and Merthyr Tydfil Railway it became part of the Great Western Railway during the Grouping of 1923. It was then closed seven years later after the track was severed by a major landslip south of the station and was considered uneconomic to restore.

"Below Abertysswg coal production had been taking place ... but the restlessness of the steep hillside towering above, the Moving Mountain, brought great unease to those within its vicinity. The mountain had moved five times since 1903 sending thousands of tons of rock to the valley floor below but it was in April 1930 that the greatest damage was done. It was then, on the twelfth of the month, that a vast avalanche of rock fell from the face of the mountain, overwhelming and ruining the offices and buildings of the New Tredegar Colliery. A further avalanche followed smashing the main road from Abertysswg to New Tredegar and demolishing the railway line thereby completely cutting off communication from Abertysswg to Bedwellty. The colliery was never used again and the road and railway never reconstructed despite many appeals for a road link to be re-opened."

== The site today ==
The station would now be located just below the junction of Station Road and Westville.

Preceding station	Disused railways	Following station
Rhymney Lower & Pontlottyn; Line and station closed	Brecon and Merthyr Tydfil Junction Railway; Rumney Railway	McLaren Colliery Halt; Line and station closed
