= Admaston railway station =

Former railway station in Shropshire, England

Admaston

General information
- Location: Admaston, Shropshire; England
- Coordinates: 52.71145°N 2.54887°W
- Grid reference: SJ630127
- Platforms: 2

Other information
- Status: Disused

History
- Original company: Shrewsbury and Birmingham Railway
- Pre-grouping: Shrewsbury and Wellington Joint Railway
- Post-grouping: Shrewsbury and Wellington Joint Railway

Key dates
- 1 June 1849: Station opens as Admaston
- 30 June 1952: Station renamed Admaston Halt
- 7 September 1964: Station closes
Location

Admaston railway station was a railway station serving the village of Admaston in Shropshire, England. It was located on what is now known as the Shrewsbury to Wolverhampton Line.

== History ==
The station was opened by the Shrewsbury and Birmingham Railway in 1849, and was shared with the Shropshire Union Railways and Canal Company. The line through the station was taken over by the London and North Western Railway. It initially closed to traffic just a few months after opening, but reopened again in the summer of 1850. It only appeared in LNWR timetables for their Shrewsbury to Stafford route in its early years, as Great Western Railway trains between Shrewsbury and Wolverhampton ran through without stopping there, though the line had come under joint ownership by 1854. Platforms, a station house and a brick single storey ticket office on the down (westbound) side were eventually provided in the final years of the nineteenth century, by which time GWR trains were calling on a regular basis (though not particularly frequently - the 1895 timetable had three trains to Birmingham and two to Stafford operated by the respective companies, whilst six trains called in the other direction). After the 1923 Grouping, joint operation passed to the London, Midland and Scottish Railway and GWR. The station remained quite modestly served thereafter (eight eastbound and seven westbound calls by 1947), though the line itself carried heavy volumes of freight and passenger traffic.

It is recorded however, that as late as 1933, 10,000+ tickets and 400+ parcels were delt with at Admaston.

The line then passed on to the Western Region of British Railways on nationalisation in 1948, with Admaston becoming an unstaffed halt at the end of June 1952. After which time, passengers boarding for Shrewsbury would purchase their tickets through the train window at Walcot and, the station signals were converted to colour aspect to enable them to be operated from Wellington number 4 signal box.

In January 1963, the line and station were transferred from the Western Region of British Railways to the London Midland Region. Shortly afterwards consent to closure was granted by the then Transport Secretary Ernest Marples the following May. The last train called here on the evening of 5 September 1964, with closure to passengers coming into effect two days later.

Preceding station	Historical railways	Following station
Wellington; Line and station open	GWR / LMS Joint Line; Shrewsbury and Birmingham Railway	Walcot; Line open, station closed

== The site today ==
Trains on the Shrewsbury to Wolverhampton Line pass the site. There are few signs today that the station was ever there, all that remains is the privately owned station house some way back from the line, the steps down to where the platform used to be on the east side (now used by track maintenance personnel), plus a short piece of retaining wall also on the eastbound side The booking office was under the railway bridge set in an arch, it of course is still there too, A feasibility study was undertaken regarding the possibility of reopening in 2003, one assumes lack of parking space was a concern.
