= Arden railway station, Scotland =

Disused railway station in Falkirk, Scotland

Arden

General information
- Location: Falkirk; Scotland
- Coordinates: 55.89825°N 3.92106°W

Other information
- Status: Disused

History
- Original company: Slamannan Railway
- Pre-grouping: North British Railway
- Post-grouping: London and North Eastern Railway

Key dates
- 31 December 1840: Station opened
- 1 May 1930: Station closed to passengers
Location

Arden railway station was a station on the Slamannan Railway. The line connected mines and villages in the Central Scotland.

Opened by the Slamannan Railway, then joining the Edinburgh and Glasgow Railway, was absorbed into the North British Railway. It became part of the London and North Eastern Railway during the Grouping of 1923. The station was then closed by that company.

== The site today ==
The site has been obliterated by open cast mining.

Preceding station	Historical railways	Following station
Whiterigg	North British Railway; Slamannan Railway	Longriggend
