= Abbey Foregate railway station =

Disused railway station in Shropshire, England

Abbey Foregate

General information
- Location: Shrewsbury, Shropshire; England
- Coordinates: 52.7095°N 2.741°W
- Grid reference: SJ501127
- Platforms: 1

Other information
- Status: Disused

History
- Opened: 1 June 1849
- Original company: Shrewsbury and Birmingham Railway
- Pre-grouping: Shrewsbury and Wellington Joint Railway

Key dates
- c. 1900: renamed Abbey Foregate Platform
- 30 September 1912: closed
Location

Abbey Foregate railway station was in Shrewsbury, Shropshire, south-east of Shrewsbury station, to the east of Severn Bridge Junction, on what is today the Shrewsbury to Wolverhampton Line. Despite its name, the nearest road was Underdale Road, not Abbey Foregate.

== History ==
Opened by the Shrewsbury and Birmingham Railway in 1849, the station name was changed to Abbey Foregate Platform around 1900. It closed to passengers in 1912.

Today there remains a signal box on the line to Wolverhampton called Abbey Foregate (code of 'AF'). It controls the junction and the access to Abbey Foregate Yard. No remains of the platform exist.

== See also ==
- Shrewsbury Abbey railway station - a station on Abbey Foregate

Preceding station	Disused railways	Following station
Shrewsbury; Line and station open	Great Western Railway; Shrewsbury and Birmingham Railway	Upton Magna; Line open, station closed
