= Alloa goods station (Caledonian Railway) =

Disused goods station in Alloa, Clackmannanshire

Coordinates: 56.112749°N 3.801142°W

Alloa goods station was a goods railway station operated by the Caledonian Railway in Alloa, Clackmannanshire, Scotland, from 1885 to 1980.

The station was the planned terminus of the Alloa Railway as authorised by Parliament in 1884 when the Caledonian Railway absorbed the Alloa Railway. The station opened on 1 October 1885, when the complete line from Dunmore Junction on the South Alloa branch opened. The station was located on the western side of Glasshouse Loan to the north of Craigward Cooperage.

Passenger traffic on this line used the main Alloa station over a North British Railway connecting line.

The station closed in 1980, most of the site now making up a bus depot.
