= Shrewsbury and Wellington Joint Railway =

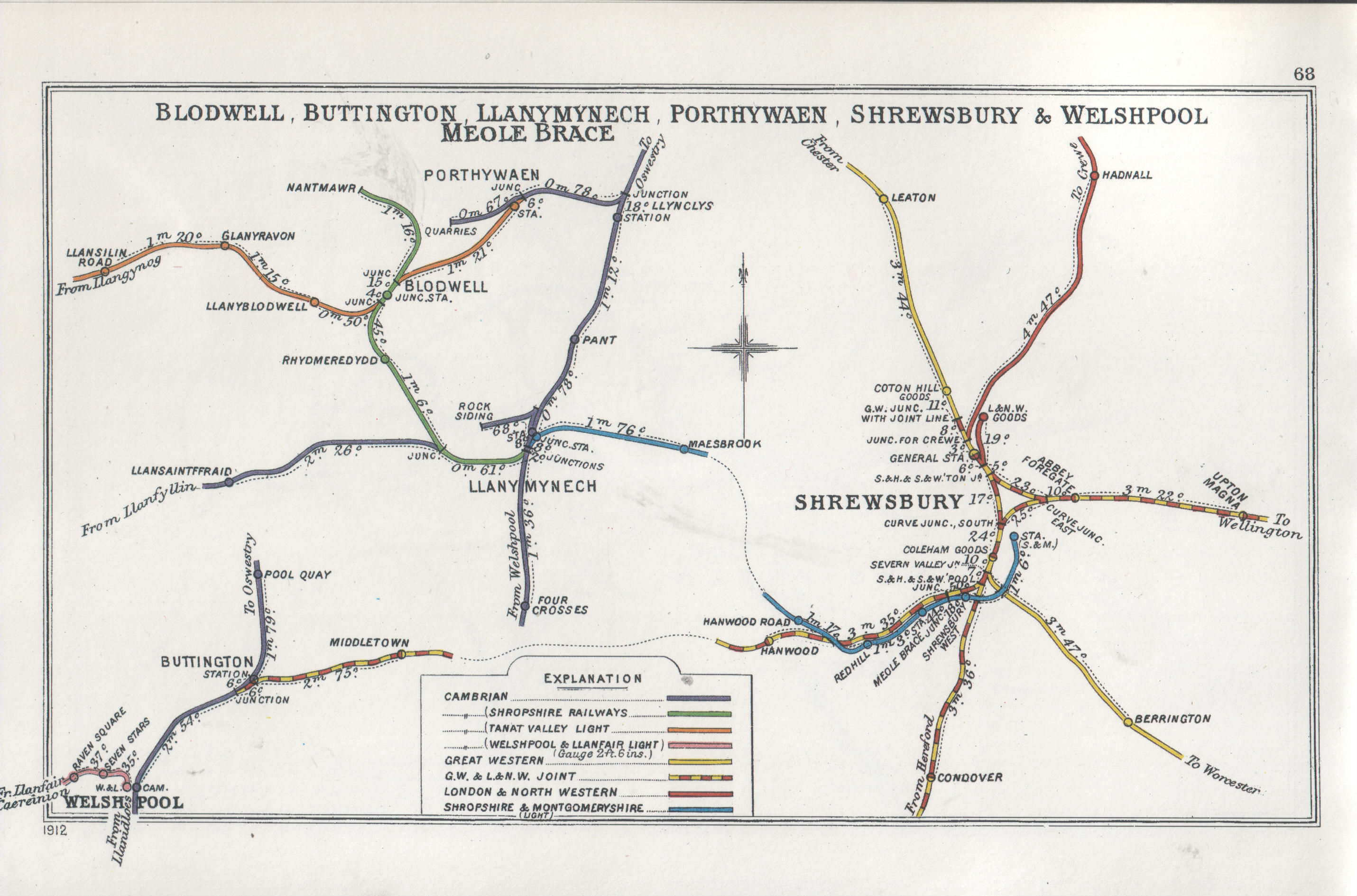
Railway Clearing House Junction Diagram showing the area around Shrewsbury in 1912

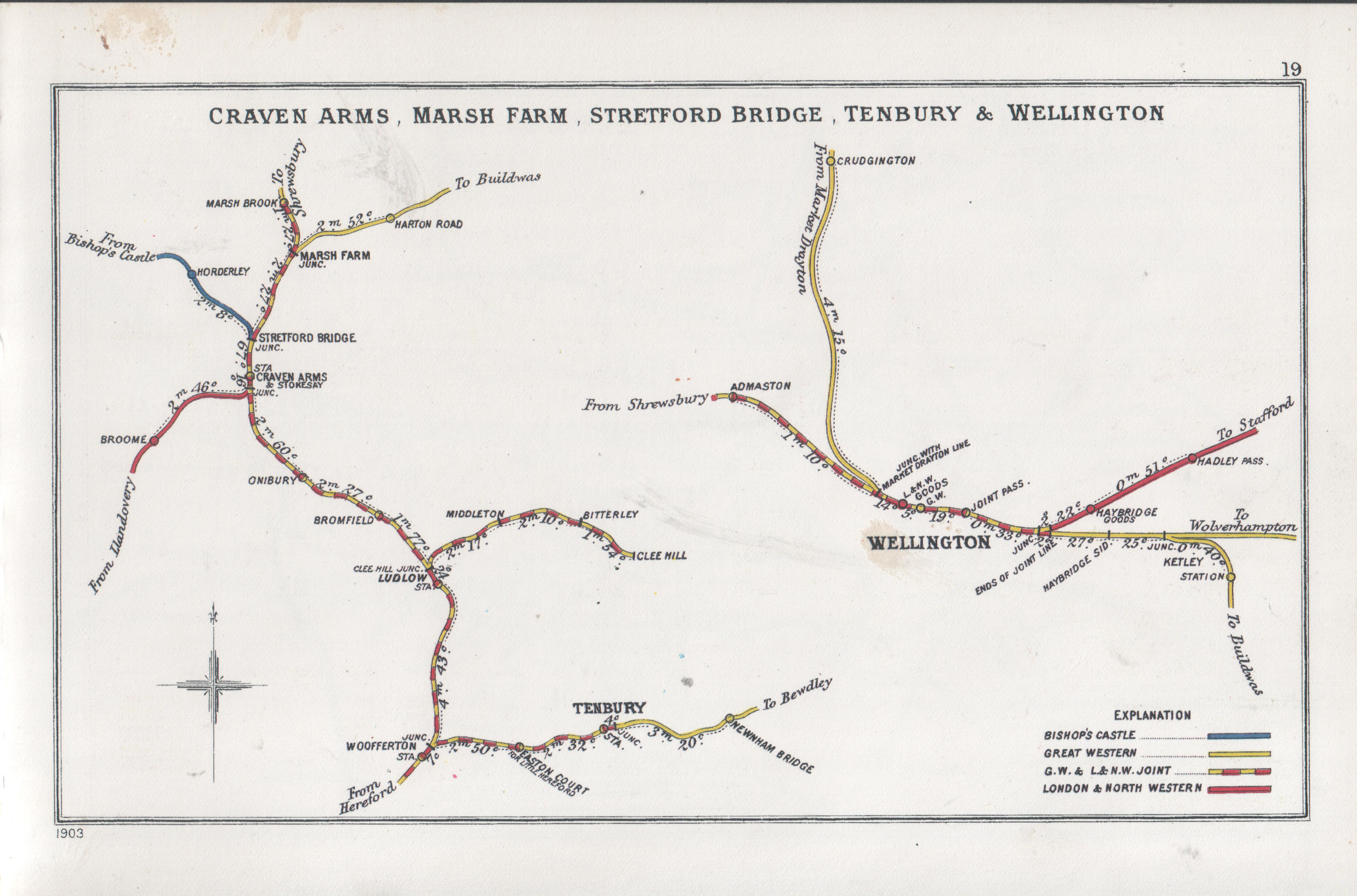
Railway Clearing House Junction Diagram showing the area around Wellington in 1903

The Shrewsbury and Wellington Joint Railway (S&WJR) was operated by the London North Western Railway and the Great Western Railway. Its line ran from Shrewsbury (Abbey Foregate station, not to be confused with Abbey station, also in Shrewsbury) to Wellington. Abbey Foregate also acted as a junction, with chords to Shrewsbury station and to the direct line to Wales.

== Construction ==
Construction, between 1846 and 1849, was a joint effort between the Shropshire Union Railways (SUR) and the Shrewsbury and Birmingham Railway (S&BR). The line was 10 miles (16 km) long.

== Opening ==
The line opened on 1 June 1849, simultaneously with the SUR line from Stafford and the first section of the S&BR, which was between Wellington and Oakengates (the latter was extended to Wolverhampton on 12 November that year). The three companies met at Stafford Junction, Wellington.

== Ownership and leasing ==
Upon completion of the SUR line, that company was leased to the London and North Western Railway (LNWR), and so passed to the London, Midland and Scottish Railway (LMS) on 1 January 1923; in the meantime, the S&BR was absorbed by the Great Western Railway (GWR) on 1 September 1854, and so from 1 January 1923 the S&WJR was joint GWR/LMS property.

== Stations ==
Of the five stations of the joint line (Abbey Foregate, Upton Magna, Walcot, Admaston and Wellington) only Wellington is still open.
