= Abingdon railway station =

Disused railway station in Oxfordshire, England

Abingdon
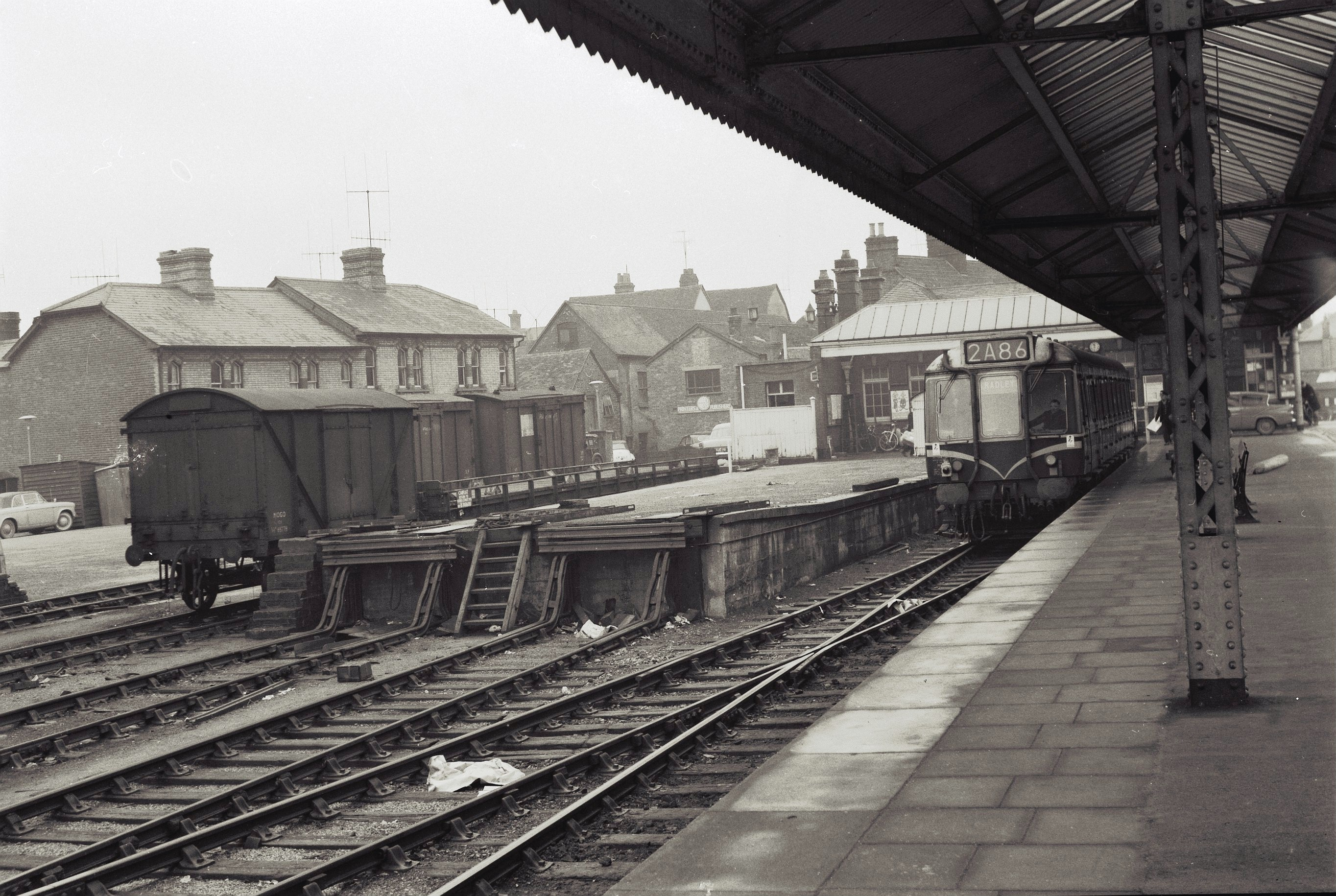
- Abingdon station in the 1960s

General information
- Location: Abingdon, Vale of White Horse; England
- Coordinates: 51.67223°N 1.28009°W
- Grid reference: SU499973
- Platforms: 1

Other information
- Status: Disused

History
- Opened: 2 June 1856
- Closed: 9 September 1963 (Passengers); June 1984 (Goods)
- Original company: Abingdon Railway
- Pre-grouping: Great Western Railway
- Post-grouping: GWR

Key dates
- November 1872: Converted from broad to standard gauge.
Location

Abingdon railway station was a station which served the town of Abingdon in Oxfordshire, England until 1963. (Note: At that time the town lay within the county of Berkshire.)

== History ==
Abingdon Railway Act 1855
- Act of Parliament
- Parliament of the United Kingdom
- Long title: An Act for making a Railway from the Oxford Branch of the Great Western Railway to Abingdon.
- Citation: 18 & 19 Vict. c. lxix

Dates
- Royal assent: 15 June 1855

Text of statute as originally enacted

Abingdon Railway Act 1862
- Act of Parliament
- Parliament of the United Kingdom
- Long title: An Act for authorizing the Abingdon Railway Company to raise further Monies and for other Purposes.
- Citation: 25 & 26 Vict. c. ccxvi

Dates
- Royal assent: 7 August 1862

The station was built by the Abingdon Railway, a short branch line authorised by the Abingdon Railway Act 1855 (18 & 19 Vict. c. lxix) at which Abingdon was the terminus and only stop. It was operated by the Great Western Railway (GWR) from its opening on 2 June 1856. The track was built to the broad gauge on land acquired from the Mayor and Aldermen of the Borough of Abingdon on 19 March 1856 at a cost of £472. Seven properties were demolished to make way for the station and yard, including the Plough Inn, which was subsequently rebuilt at a different location. The approach to the station from Stert Street had gates and no public right of way was allowed. Station facilities consisted of a single platform covered by a timber train shed. A locomotive shed was built on land which was never formally conveyed to the railway, but later acquired by adverse possession.

That the said Railway shall commence by a Junction with the Oxford Branch of the Great Western Railway at or near the Distance Post thereon denoting Fifty-seven and a Half Miles from London in the Parish of Radley in the said County of Berks, and shall terminate at or near to Stert Street in the Parishes of Saint Nicholas and Saint Helen, Abingdon, in the same County. — Section 18, Abingdon Railway Act 1855 (18 & 19 Vict. c. lxix)

The Abingdon Railway was absorbed by the GWR with the passing of the Great Western Railway Act 1904 (4 Edw. 7. c. cxcvii) on 15 August 1904. The line passed on to the Western Region of British Railways on nationalisation in 1948, and was then closed to passengers by the British Railways Board in 1963. The branch continued to be used by freight trains (notably for MG Cars) and sporadic passenger excursions, the last of which took place in June 1984. It was also sometimes pressed into service as an overnight stabling point for the Royal Train during royal visits to Oxfordshire, in connection with which the train is known to have stopped at Radley station on at least one occasion.

The branch track was lifted in the late 1980s. A fraction of the former railway line is now used for a cyclepath, while the station and the adjoining part of the line near the town centre are now occupied by a Waitrose supermarket, parking and other development.

The station featured briefly in a 1963 documentary film made for cinematic release, "High, Wide and Faster" (from the Look at Life series), which examined contemporary developments in road, rail, and sea transport.

== Routes ==
Preceding station	Disused railways	Following station
Abingdon Junction; Station closed; Line open before 1872	Abingdon Railway; Great Western Railway	Terminus
Radley; Station open; Line open after 1872	Abingdon Railway; Great Western Railway	Terminus

== Bibliography ==
- Butt, R. V. J. (October 1995). The Directory of Railway Stations: details every public and private passenger station, halt, platform and stopping place, past and present (1st ed.). Sparkford: Patrick Stephens Ltd. ISBN 978-1-85260-508-7. OCLC 60251199. OL 11956311M.
- Jowett, Alan (2000). Jowett's Nationalised Railway Atlas (1st ed.). Penryn, Cornwall: Atlantic Transport Publishers. ISBN 978-0-906899-99-1. OCLC 228266687.
- Trippett, Nigel; de Courtais, Nicholas (1985). The Abingdon Branch. Upper Bucklebury, Berks.: Wild Swan Publications Ltd. ISBN 0-906867-29-0.
