= Abbots Wood Junction railway station =

Railway station in Wadborough, England

Abbot's Wood Junction

General information
- Location: Wadborough, Wychavon, Worcestershire; England
- Coordinates: 52.1481°N 2.1631°W
- Grid reference: SO889950

Other information
- Status: Disused

History
- Opened: November 1850 (as Worcester Junction)
- Closed: 1 October 1855
- Original company: Midland Railway

Key dates
- 1 March 1852: Renamed Abbot's Wood Junction
Location

Abbots Wood Junction railway station was an early railway station in England, close to Worcester. The station, 68 miles 60 chains (68.75 miles, 110.64 km) from Derby, was opened by the Midland Railway in November 1850 on the route of the former Birmingham and Gloucester Railway. Originally named Worcester Junction, it was renamed Abbot's Wood Junction on 1 March 1852, and it was closed on 1 October 1855.

The railway junction, still extant, was created c. 1850, when the Oxford, Worcester and Wolverhampton Railway reached the Bristol and Gloucester Railway just outside Worcester, forming a connection.
