= Aberford Railway =

Closed railway in Yorkshire, England

The Aberford Railway was a privately owned light railway built in the 19th century between Garforth and Aberford in West Yorkshire, England. It was owned by the Gascoigne family of Yorkshire to transport coal from their collieries via the Great North Road and a connection with the Leeds and Selby Railway. The railway was locally known as the Fly Line.

== History and description ==
Coal mining in the Garforth area of West Yorkshire dates back centuries, and the Gascoignes, being major landholders in the area, had owned pits since at least the 17th century. The introduction of steam-driven pumps in the 18th century allowed deeper mines to be worked, and extended the usefulness of the Gascoignes' mines. The area around Garforth and Aberford was at a disadvantage compared to other mining regions because of poor transportation. High turnpike fees, and the inability to access the Aire and Calder Navigation due to competing interests owning land on the few miles to the canal meant that the sale of coal to nearby Leeds was uneconomic.

Circa 1833, surveying of the line began, by William Harker and William Walker; at the same time, the Leeds and Selby Railway was under construction, and Gascoigne, also a shareholder in the Leeds and Selby had obtained favourable rates for transport of coal to Selby on that line. The route was designed on a falling gradient from Garforth to Aberford, with a maximum gradient of 1 in 72 at the Sisters pit. Horse traction was the motive power. The line opened in the late 1830s with the cooperation of the Leeds and Selby, and carried both freight and passengers. A stationary engine was installed on the line between the Isabella and Sisters' pits which was also double tracked; the rest of the railway was single track.

Passenger traffic briefly ceased as a result of loss of a connection to Leeds whilst the Leeds and Selby railway was under George Hudson's control and was closed to passengers in favour of other lines. The line was successful in aiding the transport and sale of coal, in particular to the agricultural areas to the north such as Tadcaster and Wetherby, which lacked indigenous coal resources.

From the 1870s, horse-powered transport was replaced by steam engines – the first being a Manning Wardle Class H 0-4-0 locomotive named Mulciber purchased in 1870.

Mining reached its zenith at the beginning of the 20th century, with 440,000 tons per year being produced, 120,000 of which exported via Hull. The death of many men in the First World War, and an embargo on exported coal both contributed to the decline of the pits; in 1920, the Gascoignes sold the pits and railway, both of which were steadily run down in the next decade. The line closed in 1924, the collieries in 1930.

== Legacy and remnants ==
Much of the line is walkable as a public footpath, with a Ha-ha rebuilt as a railway cutting in the grounds of the Gascoignes family house still extant.
