= Radley =

Village in Oxfordshire, England

Coordinates: 51.689°N 1.240°W

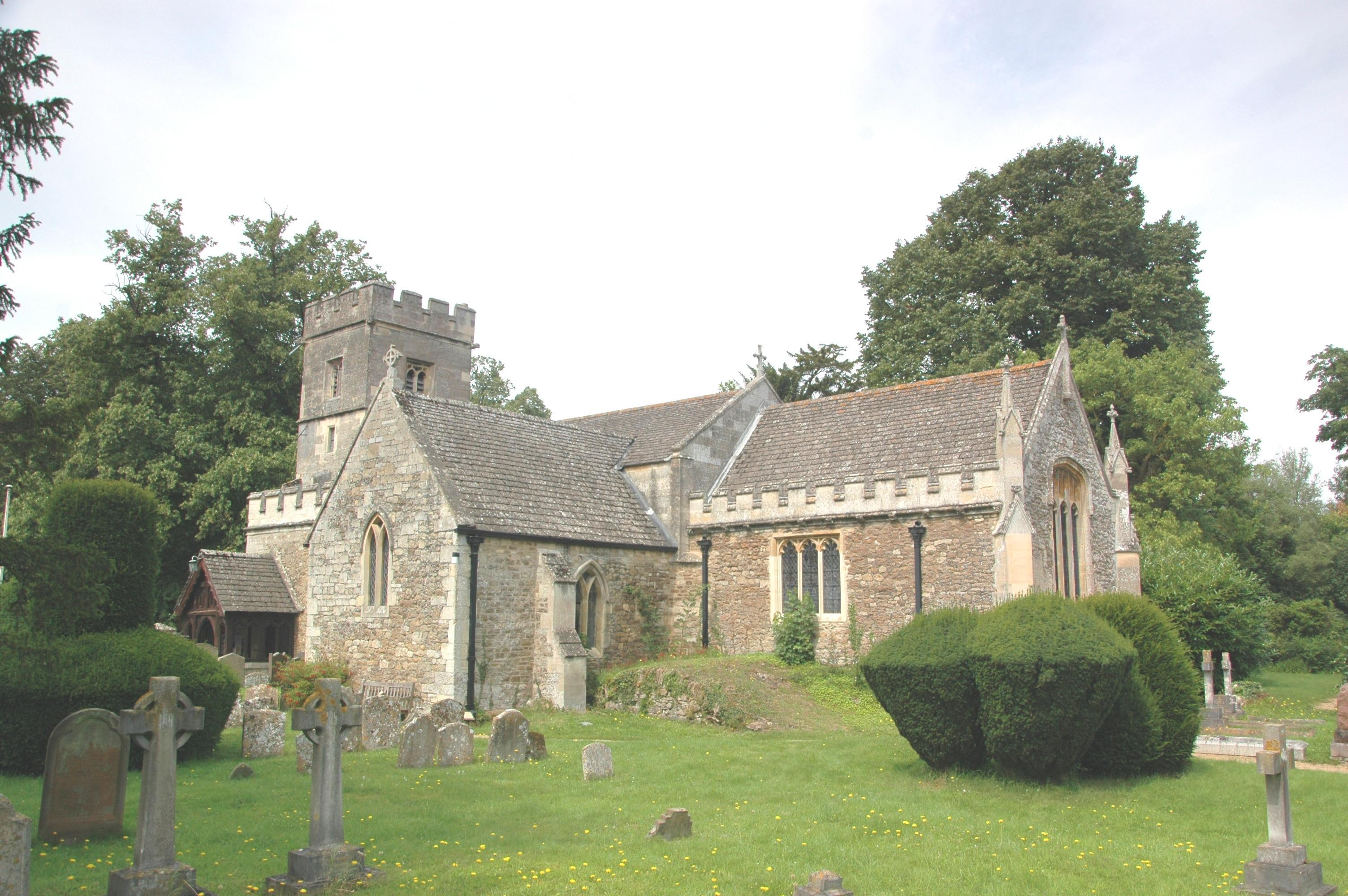
- St James the Great parish church

- Location within Oxfordshire
- Population: 2,774 (2001 census)
- OS grid reference: SU5299
- Civil parish: Radley
- District: Vale of White Horse
- Shire county: Oxfordshire
- Region: South East
- Country: England
- Sovereign state: United Kingdom
- Post town: Abingdon
- Postcode district: OX14
- Dialling code: 01235
- Police: Thames Valley
- Fire: Oxfordshire
- Ambulance: South Central
- UK Parliament: Oxford West and Abingdon
- Website: Radley, Oxfordshire

Radley is a village and civil parish about 2 miles (3 km) northeast of the centre of Abingdon, Oxfordshire. The parish includes the hamlet of Lower Radley on the River Thames. It was part of Berkshire until the 1974 boundary changes transferred it to Oxfordshire. The village is home to Radley College, a famous boarding independent school for boys from the age of thirteen to eighteen that consists of 690 pupils.

== Parish church ==
The Church of England parish church of Saint James the Great was built in about 1290. The church is built of stone, but unusually its roof is supported by wooden pillars installed by a medieval Abbot of Abingdon, who was told in a vision to "seek [them] in the forest". The present south aisle dates from the 14th century but the chancel, nave and bell tower were rebuilt in the 15th century. The windows contain Royal heraldic stained glass from the latter part of the 15th century and from the Tudor period. In the tower is a stained-glass portrait believed to represent King Henry VII.

The church is missing both its north aisle and transept, which were destroyed during the Civil War. The south doorway is 15th century, but an inscription on the present door states that it was made in 1656. In the chancel, there is a Renaissance style monument to the lord of the manor, Sir William Stonehouse (died 1632), made by Nicholas Stone. The canopy over the pulpit is said to have originally stood behind the Speaker's chair in the House of Commons and was given to the church by a local man, Speaker William Lenthall, in 1643. If so, it is the canopy from under which Parliamentarian soldiers dragged Lenthall at the end of the Long Parliament. St. James' is a Grade II* listed building.

The tower has a ring of six bells. Abel Rudhall of Gloucester cast five of them including the tenor in 1754. Mears and Stainbank of the Whitechapel Bell Foundry cast the present treble bell in 1952. St. James' also has a Sanctus bell that Henry I Knight of Reading cast in 1617. The former vicarage next to the church was built in the 15th century. Past incumbents of the parish have included the future bishops Charles Gore (1893–95) and James Nash (1895–98).

== Radley Hall ==
Abingdon Abbey held the manor of Radley until the dissolution of the monasteries in 1538. In the reign of Queen Elizabeth I, George Stonehouse built a house in Radley Park, but in 1727 the Stonehouse family replaced this with a new mansion, Radley Hall. Early in the 19th century the house was leased for a time as a Nonconformist school, and from 1847 it was leased to William Sewell who founded Saint Peter's College, Radley. The school is now generally referred to as Radley College.

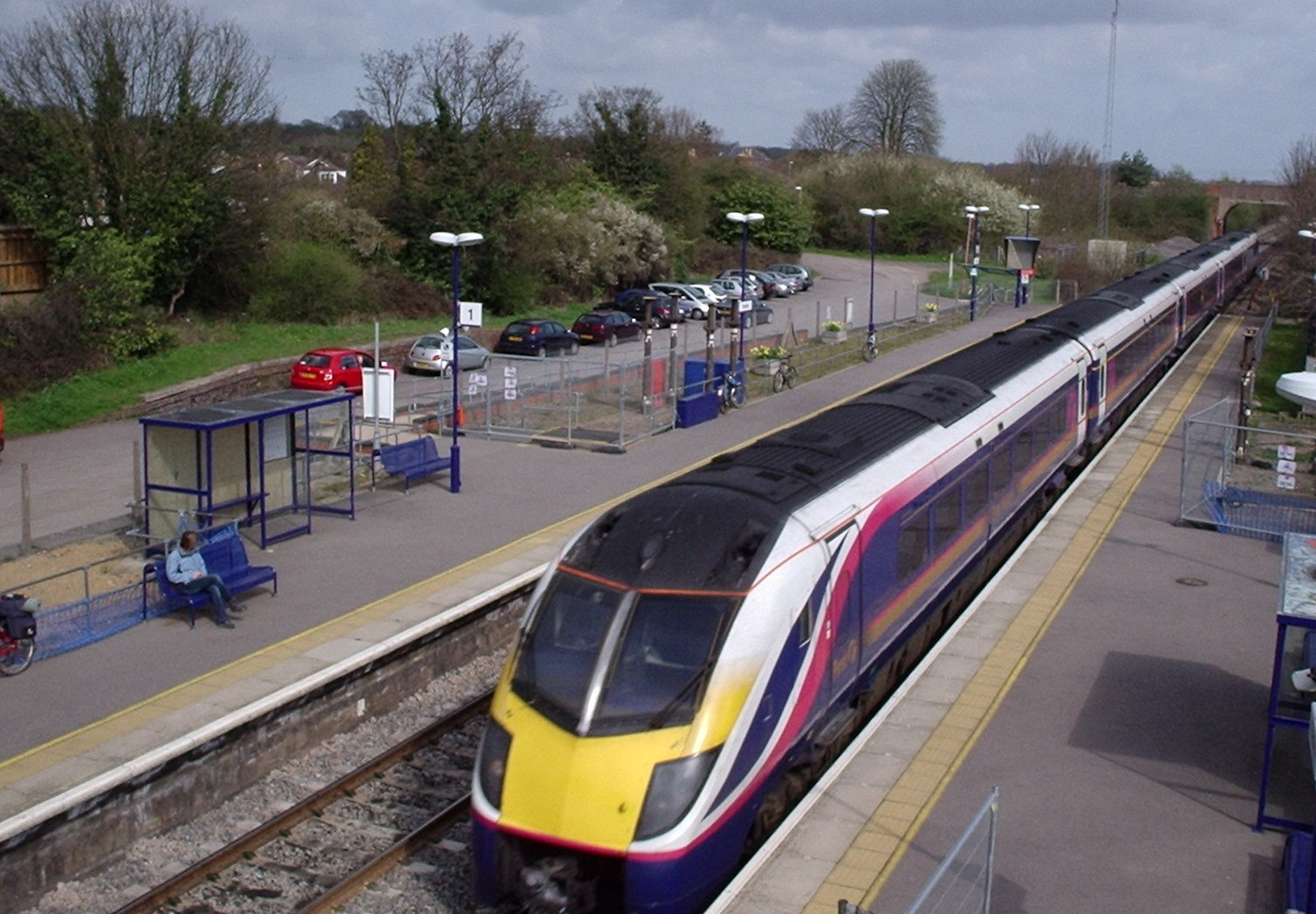
Train at Radley

== Wick Hall ==
Wick Hall is located between Radley and Thrupp Lake, off Audlett Drive. It is a Grade II* listed country house, built in about 1720 for the Tomkins family. The decoration includes Flemish wood panelling, taken from Exeter College chapel. The house was acquired by the Dockar-Drysdale family in 1850, and extended for them by Charles Bell in the 1870s.

== Railway ==
In 1844 the Great Western Railway opened an extension from Didcot to Oxford, passing through Radley parish. In 1873 the GWR opened Radley railway station 0.5 miles (800 m) southwest of the village. It is now served by Great Western Railway trains.

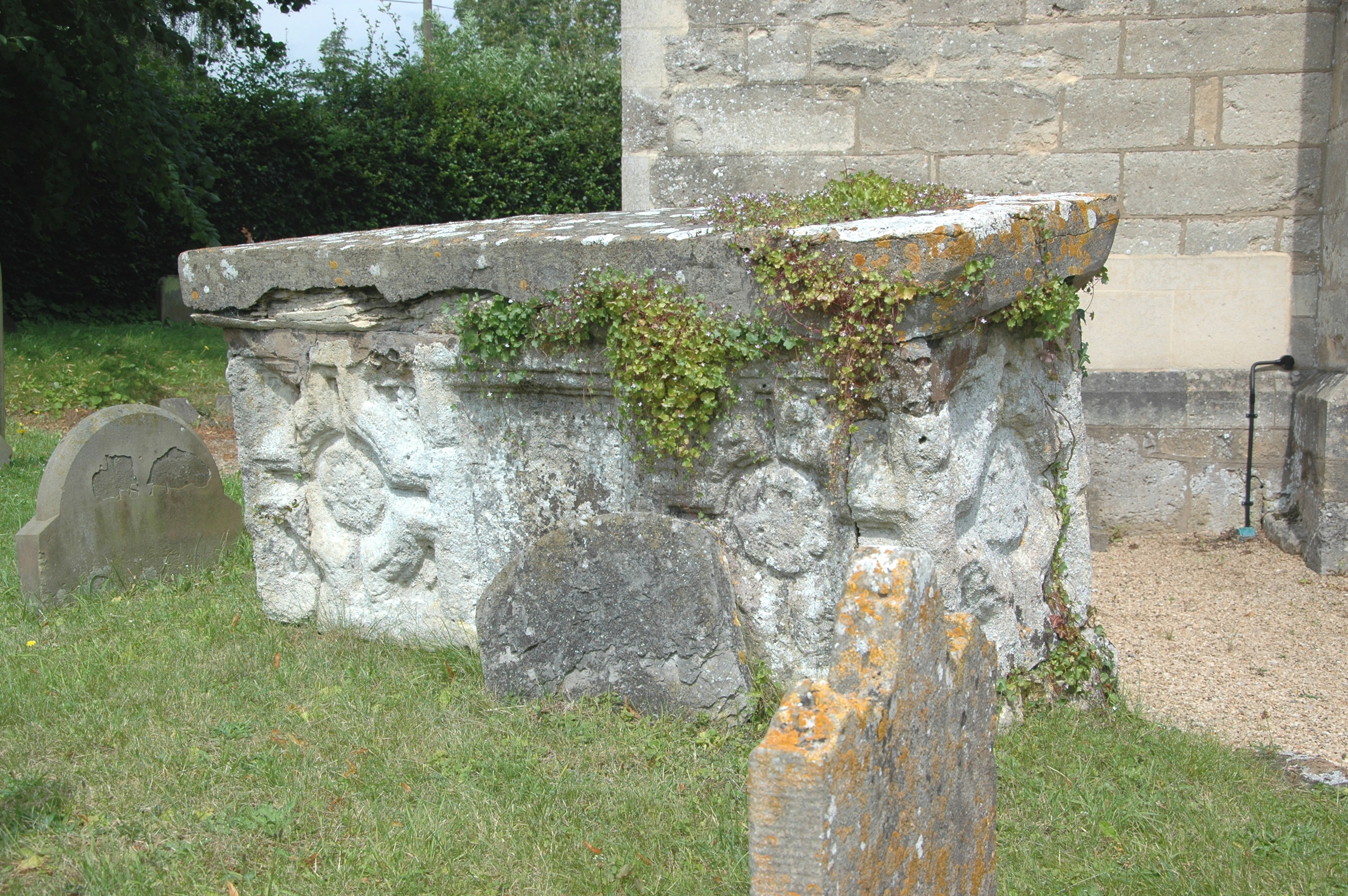
St James the Great parish church: 17th century chest tomb in the churchyard

== Radley Lakes ==
South of the village are current and former gravel pits. The disused pits have flooded, forming a number of lakes. In 1985 the Central Electricity Generating Board began filling some of these lakes with waste ash from Didcot Power Station. In June 2005 Npower applied for permission to fill in two more lakes. Npower soon withdrew Bullfield Lake from its proposal, but continued with its proposal for the larger Thrupp Lake. Local opposition formed into a protest campaign called Save Radley Lakes. In December 2008 Npower finally announced that it "no longer needed" Thrupp Lake and withdrew its application.

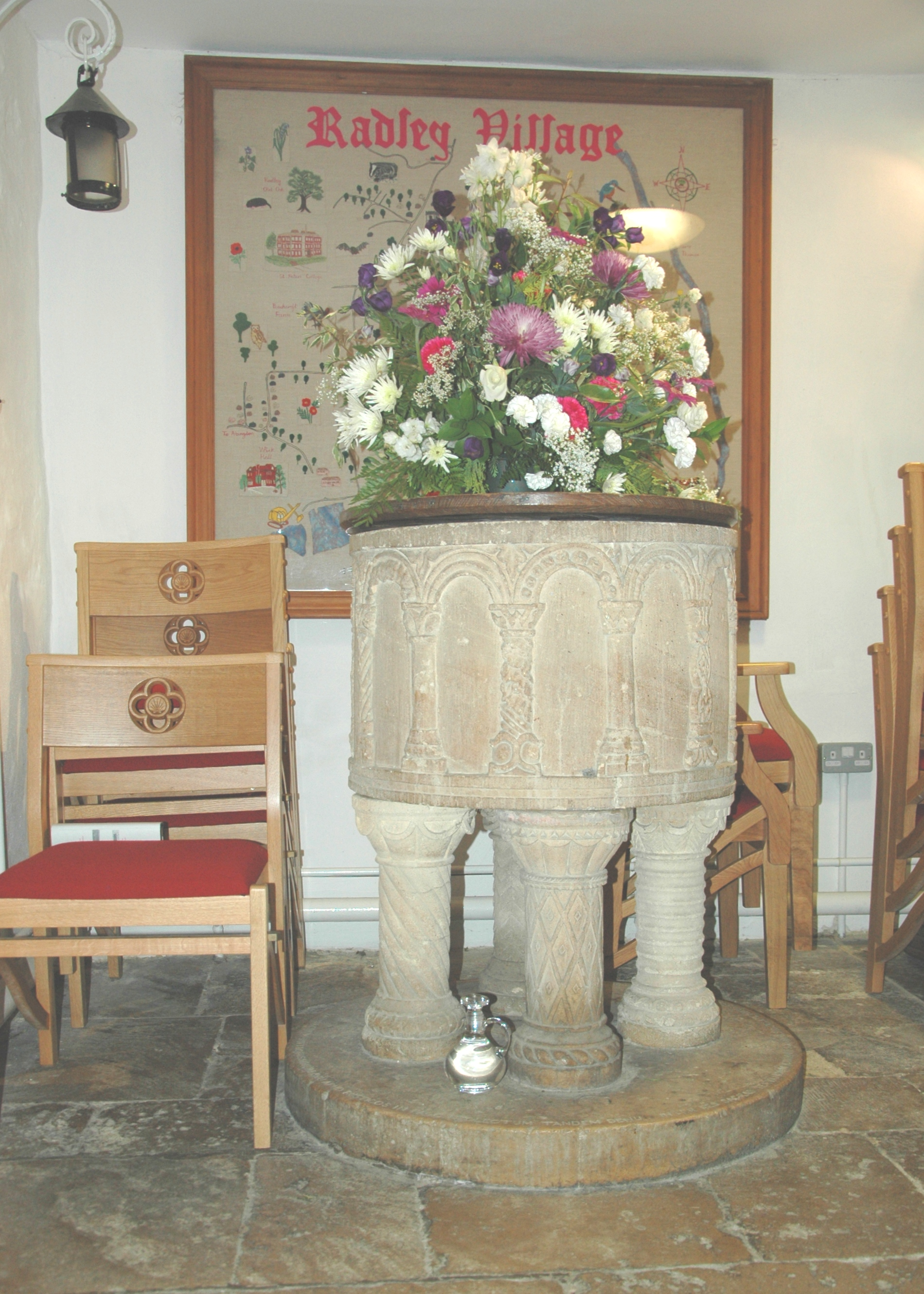
St James the Great parish church: Norman font carved with blind arcading and resting on four colonettes

== Amenities ==
Radley has a Church of England primary school, a village hall and a Women's Institute. There is a public house, the Bowyer Arms, controlled by Greene King Brewery. Radley Cricket Club plays in Oxfordshire Cricket Association Division Three.

== History society ==
Radley has a local history society which has produced a number of publications and maintains an archive of local material. Radley vicarage by Radley History Club, 2005. A report of a 'buildings record' survey and archive research undertaken to determine the history, construction, and later development of this 14th-century building The history of Radley by Patrick Drysdale … [and others] Radley History Club, 2002. History of the village from prehistory to the present.

== Notable residents ==
Included among Radley's former residents are: Dr. Gary Botting, now an extradition lawyer in Canada, who attended the Church of England Primary School and began collecting moths in Radley in 1948.

== Sources and further reading ==
- Barclay, Alistair; Halpin, Claire (1999). Excavations at Barrow Hills, Radley, Oxfordshire: Volume 1 The Neolithic and Bronze Age Monument Complex. Thames Valley Landscape Series. Vol. 11. Oxford: Oxford University School of Archaeology. ISBN 0-947816-89-5.
- Chambers, Richard; McAdam, Ellen (2007). Excavations at Radley Barrow Hills, Radley, Oxfordshire: Volume 2 The Romano-British Cemetery and Anglo-Saxon Settlement. Thames Valley Landscape Series. Vol. 25. Oxford: Oxford University School of Archaeology. ISBN 978-0-947816-73-5.
- Page, W.H.; Ditchfield, P.H., eds. (1924). A History of the County of Berkshire, Volume 4. Victoria County History. pp. 410–416.
- Pevsner, Nikolaus (1966). Berkshire. The Buildings of England. Harmondsworth: Penguin Books. pp. 196–197.
