= Slamannan Railway =

Former railway line in Scotland

The Slamannan Railway was an early mineral railway between the north-eastern margin of Airdrie and Causewayend on the Union Canal, near Linlithgow, Scotland.

The Slamannan Railway was built to give access for minerals from pits in the Slamannan area to market in Glasgow (over connecting railways) and Edinburgh (over the Union Canal), and it also briefly provided an early passenger connection between Glasgow and Edinburgh in association with other railways and the canal. It had a rope-worked incline at Causewayend.

The line opened on 31 August 1840. It crossed very thinly populated moorland, and it was dependent on promised mineral extraction on its own route, but this proved disappointing, and traffic was limited by the extended route over other railways westward, and transshipment to the canal eastward. It was never successful commercially, and in 1848 it combined with other companies, forming the Monkland Railways.

None of the route is still in use, and much of it near Airdrie has been obliterated by modern open-cast mineral extraction.

== Origins ==
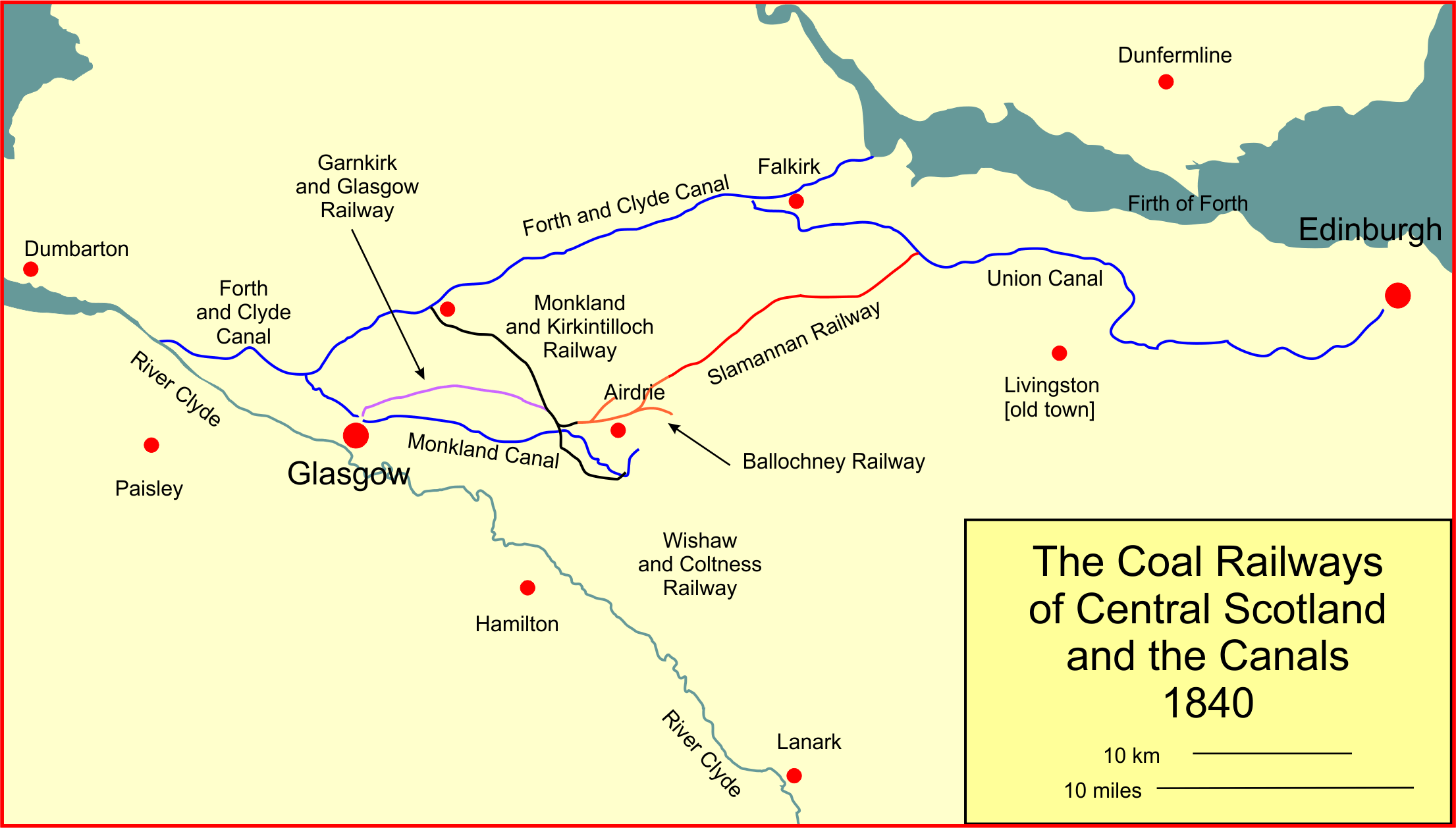
Map of the canals and coal railways in Central Scotland in 1840

In the first decades of the nineteenth century, there was a considerable increase in coal and iron ore extraction, and of iron smelting, in the general area of Coatbridge and Airdrie, and improvements in the efficiency of the process of iron manufacture led to accelerating demand for coal and iron ore, which in turn emphasised the weakness of the means of transport of the heavy materials. In 1771 the Monkland Canal had opened between the Airdrie pits and Glasgow, and it was followed by the Forth and Clyde Canal in 1790. In 1826 the Monkland and Kirkintilloch Railway (M&KR) was opened, conveying the minerals to the canal at Kirkintilloch for onward transport to Glasgow and Edinburgh.

In 1828 the Ballochney Railway gave access from pits north and east of Airdrie to the M&KR and thence onward to the canal; and in 1831 the Garnkirk and Glasgow Railway was opened, giving a more direct rail connection to Glasgow, but terminating at Townhead canal wharf there. In 1831–2 the Edinburgh and Dalkeith Railway opened, giving access from pits in the Eskbank and Dalhousie areas to Edinburgh and Leith.

Coal and iron deposits were being worked on a small scale in the Slamannan area, about halfway between Airdrie and Linlithgow; it was then in Stirlingshire, now in Falkirk District. Seeing the success of the other railways, businessmen interested in the pits promoted a railway to open up their own district, and they formed the Slamannan Railway Company. It was to run from a junction with the Ballochney Railway near Arbuckle, north-east of Airdrie, to a wharf on the Union Canal at Causeway End (nowadays spelt Causewayend), 23 miles (37 km) from Edinburgh. Thus it would give transport access for pits on the line to Glasgow (over the Ballochney and Monkland and Kirkintilloch lines) and to Edinburgh, by transshipping to the Union Canal at Causewayend.

The promoters anticipated a relatively frequent horse-drawn one-coach passenger service between Airdrie and Causewayend. The undulations on the route would allow the horse to ride on the downhill sections:

The drawing horse [would be] carried behind the coach in a covered stable waggon. In this way a single Horse would be enabled to perform the journey from Airdrie to Causewayend with a Passenger Carriage once a day, and allowing for spare Horses, five opportunities per day could be given at the expense of maintaining six Horses, with the means of conveying from 130 to 140 Passengers each way daily.

== The company is authorised ==
Slamannan Railway Act 1835
- Act of Parliament
- Parliament of the United Kingdom
- Long title: An Act to make and maintain a Railway from Stanrig and Arbuckle in the County of Lanark to the Union Canal at Causewayend in the County of Stirling.
- Citation: 5 & 6 Will. 4. c. lv

Dates
- Royal assent: 3 July 1835

The company was incorporated by the Slamannan Railway Act 1835 (5 & 6 Will. 4. c. lv) on 3 July 1835 with a share capital of £86,000 and loan capital of £20,000. The proprietors had presented the bill to Parliament with the minimum of publicity, and no subscription list had been prepared. Thomas Grahame had said that "The scheme is so obviously advantageous that the subscriptions would be easily filled up."

The Slamannan Railway Act 1835 specified that work on construction could not start until the estimated cost of construction was fully subscribed, and this forced a delay until mid-1836, and first contracts were not let until October. John Benjamin Macneill (later to be called "the Father of the Irish railway system") was appointed principal engineer and Thomas Telford Mitchell was Resident Engineer.

Slamannan Railway Act 1839
- Act of Parliament
- Parliament of the United Kingdom
- Long title: An Act for enabling the Slamannan Railway Company to raise a farther Sum of Money.
- Citation: 2 & 3 Vict. c. lvii

Dates
- Royal assent: 1 July 1839

Text of statute as originally enacted

At the annual general meeting in February 1838 it was reported that one of the two construction contractors had failed to achieve the required output, and part of his contract was taken over by the company directly; however a year later it was stated that both contractors had failed to achieve the required progress, and moreover that almost the whole of the subscribed capital had been expended. A further act of Parliament, the Slamannan Railway Act 1839 (2 & 3 Vict. c. lvii), was obtained in July 1839, authorising total share capital of £140,000 and the usual additional one-third of the value in borrowings.

The construction process had been painful, the company "suffered during construction from 'considerable difficulty' in obtaining land, procrastinating contractors, high material costs, and problems of money raising in the deepening depression of the late 1830s"

The engineer Macneill reported to the committee of management that the nearby Wishaw and Coltness Railway had experienced difficulties with horse haulage by independent operators, referring to "the great confusion which always takes place on railways where a great number of horses are employed by persons of different interests". Prompted by Macneill, the thoughts of the committee turned to locomotive haulage, and to the possibility of a through passenger service between Glasgow and Edinburgh. This would require the co-operation of three other railways—the Garnkirk and Glasgow Railway (G&GR), the M&KR and the Ballochney Railway (BRly)—as well as the Union Canal Company. The M&KR was not encouraging.

== Opening at last ==
Eventually the contractors' difficulties were overcome, and on 30 July 1840 the directors, some shareholders, the directors of the Union Canal, and some engineers made a special journey throughout from the Garnkirk and Glasgow Railway's Townhead depot to Edinburgh over the G&GR, M&KR, BRly, the Slamannan line itself, and after transferring to a boat, the Union Canal. The railway part of this journey took 95 minutes to "Causeyend" (Causeway End) and

"By one of the swift passage boats the party were conveyed from Causeyend to Edinburgh in two hours and a half—the whole journey from Glasgow to Edinburgh being thus performed in four hours with the utmost ease and pleasure."

— Glasgow Herald

The directors of the Union Canal had subscribed some of the Slamannan capital and its parliamentary costs, and evidently saw collaboration with the Slamannan as being the future. They were evidently persuaded by this demonstration run, for on 4 August they ordered a larger passenger boat for the new intercity trade. The arrival in "Edinburgh" was of course at the canal's basin at Port Hopetoun, some distance from the city centre.

On 5 August 1840 the line opened, with a daily passenger train each way.

== Operation ==
=== Passenger ===
At first, the passenger trade seemed to boom, with the daily train leaving Townhead at 10:15 a.m. and the westbound journey starting by boat at 7:00 a.m. An omnibus ran from the centre of Edinburgh to connect, departing at 6:45 a.m. Fares were 7s 6d (first class and cabin on the boat), and 5s (second class and steerage). The journey took something over four hours, comparable with the stagecoach transit; a throughout boat trip over the Union Canal and the Forth and Clyde Canal continued in operation for the time being, taking 7½ hours. By October the Union Canal had procured a second boat and there were now two railway-and-canal journeys each way daily.

This was now the principal means of travel between the two great cities, involving a canal boat trip, the transit of three rope-worked inclines over four railway companies, and a railway running on stone block sleepers and, west of Arbuckle, finding a path among horse-drawn coal trains.

It was not long before a businessman started to operate a coach direct from Princes Street in Edinburgh to Causewayend, cutting 45 minutes off the journey (at a premium price) and of course by-passing the canal transit altogether. This proved popular, and the G&GR (apparently the driving force in this joint operation) encouraged the development of the stagecoach connection: the stagecoach operator would offer a fare reduction in return for being the favoured connection at the Edinburgh end. The Union Canal had provided considerable financial support to the Slamannan company in its early days and it was now being squeezed out. Reliability of the westbound canal trip seems to have been poor, and on 5 November 1841, the Slamannan board decided that the westbound train would leave at the advertised time whether or not the connecting boat had arrived. As this made the boat-and-railway journey practically impossible, the G&GR stopped selling through tickets for that journey, and the poor Union Canal had to try to reinvigorate its intercity business over the Forth and Clyde Canal instead.

Nonetheless the railway transit was also under threat, and a fare reduction in December 1841 did little to stave off the approaching doom: on 21 February 1842 the Edinburgh and Glasgow Railway opened its railway (to Haymarket). As a relatively modern, fast and direct line, it put an end to the Slamannan's through passenger service.

=== Mineral and goods ===
By contrast the mineral traffic was disappointing at the beginning; of course it relied on as-yet unproven pits in the area being developed. Moreover, all the trade to Edinburgh involved a transshipment to the canal at Causewayend. There was practically no goods (non-mineral) traffic. Thus in 1841 mineral receipts were £1,271 (from 26,776 tons) compared with £6,174 from passengers. The mineral tonnage climbed steadily, rising to 74,130 tons in 1845, still woefully weak.

=== Locomotives ===
At first the company operated two locomotives on passenger duties; it seems that until March 1842 one of them worked exclusively below the Ballochney's inclines, to and from Townhead. In this period there was one goods engine operating, although the sparse traffic levels led to only one engine at a time being required for duty from 1842.

The locomotive stock included Borealis from the Rowan Company and two Fairbairn locomotives, Thistle and Rose.

== After the opening of the Edinburgh and Glasgow Railway ==
The Slamannan Railway had been built with high hopes of revolutionising transport between Glasgow and Edinburgh, as well as gaining access to rich new mineral fields. It was disappointed in both respects, and the opening of the Edinburgh and Glasgow Railway (E&GR) in 1842 seemed to be a hammer blow to the Slamannan company, with their primitive sleeper block railway and a suddenly out-of-date track gauge. Although the line gave access for the first time to isolated moorland communities, the traffic brought little money in.

In the best ways of management, the directors saw this as an opportunity: if they could connect to the E&GR with its more efficient connections to Edinburgh and elsewhere, they could enhance the traffic they carried. At Causewayend they were close to the E&GR and a connecting line there was the solution.

=== Slamannan Junction Railway ===
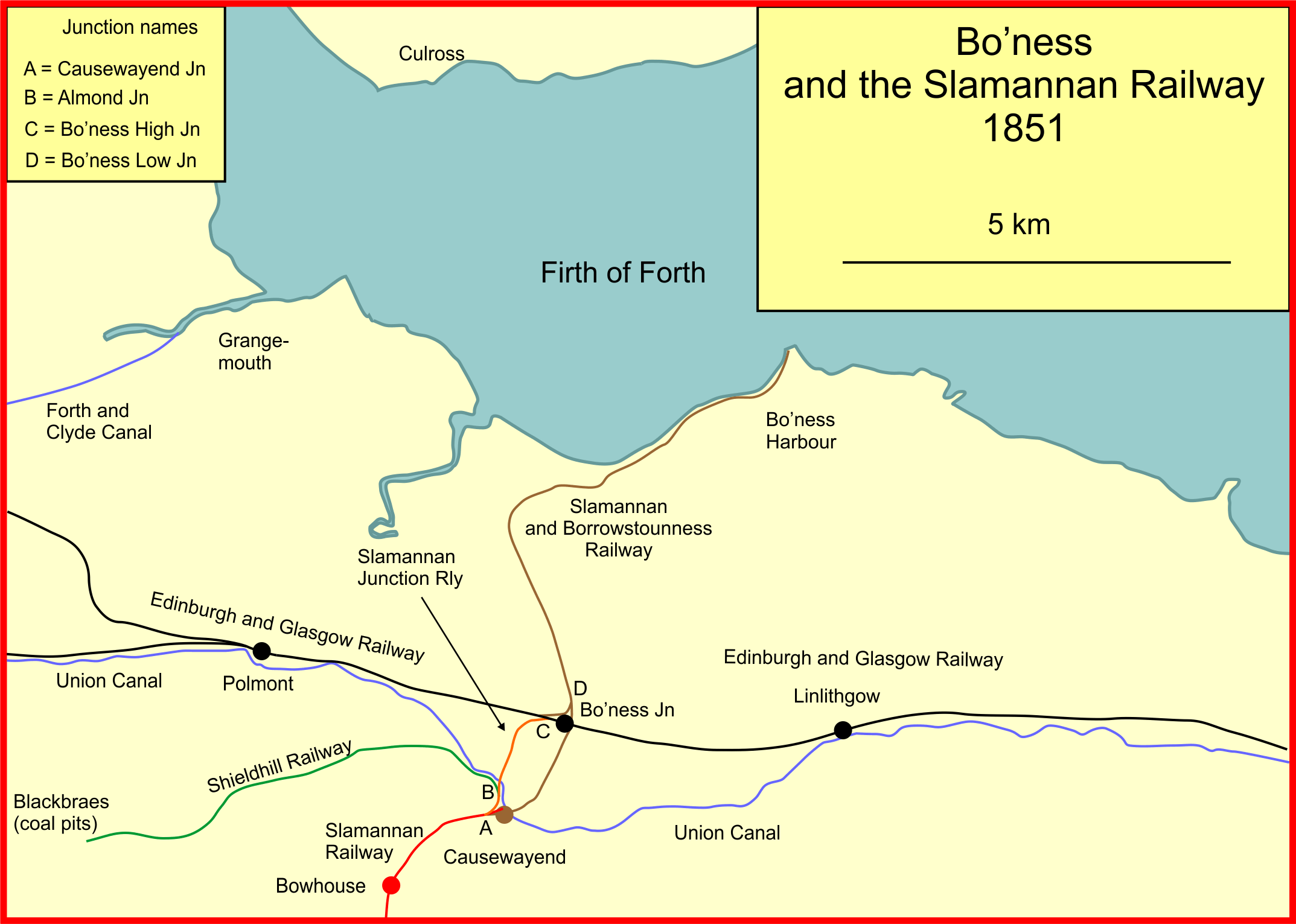
Bo'ness and connections to the Slamannan Railway and the E&GR

The E&GR was persuaded to subscribe half the cost of the connecting link, and a nominally independent company, the Slamannan Junction Railway was promoted in Parliament, getting its act of Parliament, the Slamannan Junction Railway Act 1844 (7 & 8 Vict. c. lxx), on 4 July 1844. It was to run from Bo'ness Junction (later renamed Manuel High Level, near Myrehead) on the E&GR main line, to Causewayend, forming an east-to-south connection.

Its application to Parliament had been supported jointly by the E&GR and the Slamannan Company, and shortly after obtaining its act, the shareholders sold the company to the E&GR. So the E&GR built the line, on the standard gauge; the work was finished by January 1847, but it did not come into operation until August 1847 when the Slamannan had converted its gauge.

== Attempted take over and change of gauge ==
The Edinburgh and Glasgow Railway started negotiations in 1844 to take over the various Monkland coal railways; and at the same time they applied for permission to change to the gauge of the track to standard. However, in May 1846, the Edinburgh and Glasgow Railway was refused permission to amalgamate and it decide to withdraw on 31 December 1846. The Caledonian Railway had by that time taken over the Wishaw and Coltness Railway and the Garnkirk and Glasgow Railway, as part of its plan to get access to Glasgow over those lines.

The Slamannan Railway, together with the Ballochney Railway and the Monkland and Kirkintilloch Railway obtained authorisation to change to standard gauge and completed the process on 26 July and 27 July 1847.

In 1847 a branch was opened to a pit at Jawcraig.

== Amalgamation to form the Monkland Railways and after ==
On 14 August 1848 the Slamannan Railway merged with the Monkland and Kirkintilloch Railway and the Ballochney Railway to become the Monkland Railways.

A 4 1/2-mile (7.2 km) extension—the Slamannan and Borrowstounness Railway—was built to Bo'ness, opening on 17 March 1851. The Slamannan and Borrowstounness Railway Act 1846 (9 & 10 Vict. c. cvii) of 26 June 1846 authorising this extension, also allowed the railway to lease the harbour at Bo'ness but this lease was not followed through.

Under the Monkland Railways the connections to the E&GR improved the Slamannan main line's value, and some of the mineral deposits became commercially viable at last. A number of branch lines were opened to serve those remote from the Slamannan main line, and numerous tramways and private mineral lines extended the reach of the branches further. In 1855 a more ambitious branch, to Bathgate, was opened, from Blackston Junction (often also spelt Blackstone Junction). This was no passenger branch: it turned south away from the passenger station, and led to the important chemical works on the south of the town.

The terrain crossed by the railway never encouraged significant local passenger traffic, and in this period the passenger train service continued at a moderate level.

The commercial performance of the Monkland Railways improved a little, but they were unable to compete against the more modern railways, and a sale to the E&GR became the best way forward. The Monkland Railways were absorbed by the Edinburgh and Glasgow Railway, ratified by the Edinburgh and Glasgow and Monkland Railways Amalgamation Act 1865 (28 & 29 Vict. c. ccxvii) dated 5 July 1865, and the sale was effective from 31 July 1865. A day later (on 1 August 1865) the Edinburgh and Glasgow Railway was absorbed into the North British Railway.

== Engineering ==
The track gauge originally adopted was 4 ft 6 in (1,372 mm), to conform to the gauge of the adjoining railways. A single line was laid with space for subsequent doubling. Rails of 50 pounds per yard (25 kg/m) with a parallel single-headed profile were used. Stone blocks were used for sleepers although some timber sleepers were used also. There was an area of very poor ground at Arden Moss, where longitudinal timber bearers on cross-timbers were used in effect forming floating rafts:

The line at the western end passes over a flow-moss from 30 to 40 feet deep, for a distance of 2 miles. Here the rails had to be literally floated on rafts of timber, and continued floating for some time after the trade had commenced, until at length, by continued pouring in of hard material—such as gravel, stones, &c.—this part of the road is now comparatively firm and solid. It had, however, for some months after the trains commenced to run, a very singular, and to many, an alarming appearance,—the engines and carriages, as they went along, causing a deflection of the platforms or rafts, of from 2 to 3 feet, which gradually rose to their proper level behind the train, exactly like a sluggish wave, as soon as the whole had passed over.

The inclined plane at Causewayend was 800 yards (732 m) long. Murdoch, Aitken & Co supplied a 50 horsepower (37 kW) stationary engine, and Thomas Nicholson of Dundee provided the rope and "a cask of patent oil".

A canal basin and wharves were provided at Causewayend, paid for jointly by the Slamannan company and the Union Canal.

== The route ==
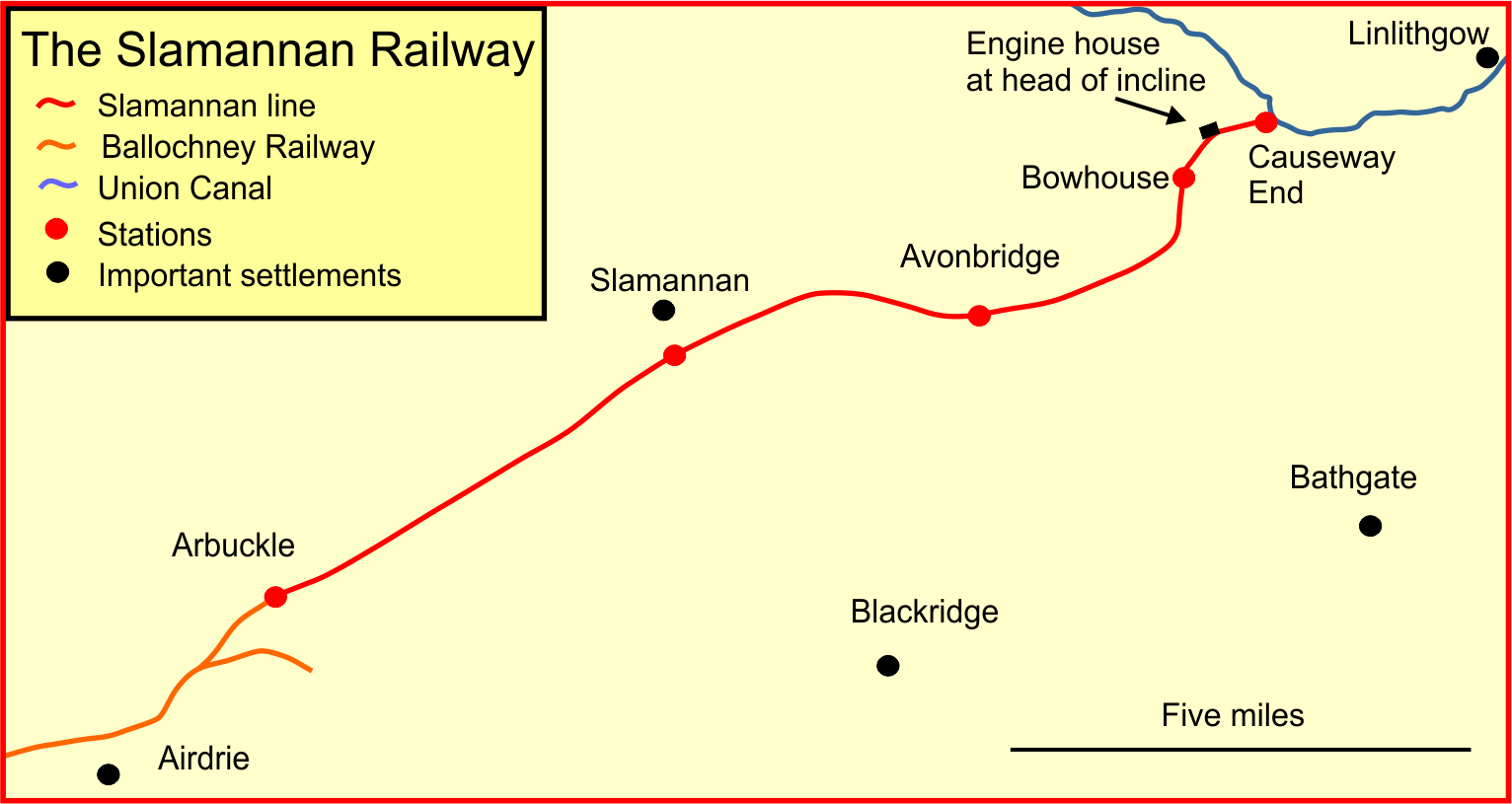
Map of the Slamannan Railway

The line ran from the northern branch of the Ballochney Railway at Arbuckle (Note: Awdry says the point of connection was Airdriehill) to Causewayend, a distance of 12 1/2 miles (20.1 km).

Whishaw lists the "inclinations" on the route; only one is steeper than 1 in 100 (10‰), at Causewayend where the line descends to the level of the canal at a gradient of 1 in 22 (45.5‰). The length of this incline is 800 yards (732 m) and it is "to be worked by a fixed engine of 50-horse power". This was a rope-worked inclined plane, where groups of wagons were hauled up or let down under the control of the rope.

Whishaw states that the rest of the line is "to be worked by locomotive engines".

"The level road-crossings are fifteen in number."

Land was acquired for a double track line, although only single track was laid. The rails "are of the single parallel form [i.e. not fish-bellied] ... weighing 50 pounds per yard (25 kg/m) lineal, and are fixed with 3 feet (0.9 m) bearings in cast-iron chairs, the sockets of which are made to correspond exactly with the cross-section of the rails, so that keys are entirely dispensed with."

"Both stone blocks and wooden sleepers are used for the permanent-way".

"In passing over Arden Moss, for a length of 1 1/2 miles, the rails are entirely laid on longitudinal timbers of red pine, having a scantling of 10 inches by 4 inches. These timbers rest on cross sleepers of beech, larch, or Scotch fir, which are 9 feet in length, and have a cross section of 12 inches by 6 inches, being placed at intervals of 3 feet."

"The ballasting consists of broken freestone, 10 inches below [the level of the underside of] the blocks or sleepers."

In 1844 a two-mile (3.2 km) extension at Causeway End, to link it to the Edinburgh and Glasgow Railway was authorised.

It was built to the track gauge of 4 ft 6 in (1,372 mm), then commonly used among similar railways in Scotland.

== The North British Railway and later ==
The attraction to the North British Railway of purchasing the Monkland lines was access to pits and iron works on the network, and in effect the Slamannan became a mineral branch line. The passenger service continued, no longer aspiring to be other than purely local, with (in 1895) an unbalanced service of three and four trains between Coatbridge and Manuel, taking about an hour for the journey. In 1922 the service was pretty well the same.

The coal extraction on the Slamannan's line declined in the twentieth century, and in 1930 the passenger service was discontinued, and the route was severed in the centre, becoming a branch from Manuel to Avonbridge at the east end, and from Airdrie to Slamannan at the west end. These lines too closed down and by 1964 everything had closed.

Paradoxically open cast mining has become widespread in the area around Arbuckle and the western extremity of the line, obliterating its course. The remainder of the route is relatively intact, crossing unpromising moorland which has seen little development.

== Topography ==
The western extremity of the Slamannan Railway was Whiterigg. Taking that as a starting point, locations on the route are located as follows:

- Whiterigg station; opened 3 October 1862; closed 1 May 1930:
- Arden station; opened 31 December 1840; closed 1 May 1930;
- Longriggend (earlier the location was spelt Langrigend); passenger station opened November 1862; closed 1 May 1930;
- Limerigg Junction: Limerigg Branch diverged to the south; coal pits;
- North Monkland Junction: North Monkland Railway converges from the north; opened 1878;
- Slamannan station; opened 5 August 1840; closed 1 May 1930; numerous pits served by tramways on south side of the line
- Strathavon Junction; branch to Jawcraig pit opened 1847, converged on north side; later much extended when the pits multiplied; also known as the Strathavon Valley Branch;
- Glenellrig station; opened in the late 1840s and closed 1 January 1850;
- Avonbridge station; opened 5 August 1840; closed 1 May 1930; apparently on the east side of the level crossing at first, moved later to the west side
- Blackstone station; opened January 1863; later Blackstone Junction, then Blackston Junction; closed 1 May 1930; branch opened 1855, diverging to the south to Bathgate;
- Bowhouse station; opened late 1840s; closed 1 May 1930; Bowhouse Branch from Roughrigg Colliery opened 1868 converged from west; several mineral branches later extended the line;
- Causewayend incline;
- Causewayend Junction; the Slamannan and Borrowstounness Railway diverged to the south, and the Slamannan Junction Railway diverged to the north. The Almond Iron Works was also located at this point later, with extensive sidings on the north side of the line;
- Causewayend Wharf on the Union Canal; Causewayend passenger station opened 5 August 1840; closed 1 May 1930;

The Causewayend passenger station was later built on the east side of the canal, on the Slamannan and Borrowstounness Railway route to Bo'ness.

== Sources ==
- Awdry, Christopher (1990). Encyclopaedia of British Railway Companies. Sparkford: Patrick Stephens Ltd. ISBN 1-8526-0049-7. OCLC 19514063. CN 8983.
- Jowett, Alan (March 1989). Jowett's Railway Atlas of Great Britain and Ireland: From Pre-Grouping to the Present Day (1st ed.). Sparkford: Patrick Stephens Ltd. ISBN 978-1-85260-086-0. OCLC 22311137.
- Lewin, Henry Grote (1925). Early British Railways. A short history of their origin & development 1801-1844. London: The Locomotive Publishing Co Ltd. OCLC 11064369.
- Robertson, C. J. A. (1983). The Origins of the Scottish Railway System: 1722-1844 (1st ed.). Edinburgh: John Donald Publishers Ltd. ISBN 0-8597-6088-X.
- Thomas, John (1971). A Regional History of the Railways of Great Britain. Vol. VI Scotland: The Lowlands and the Borders (1st ed.). Newton Abbot, Devon: David & Charles. ISBN 0-7153-5408-6. OCLC 16198685.
- Thomas, John; Paterson, Rev A. J. S. (1984). A Regional History of the Railways of Great Britain. Vol. VI Scotland: The Lowlands and the Borders (2nd ed.). Newton Abbott, Devon: David & Charles. ISBN 0-9465-3712-7. OCLC 12521072.
- Whishaw, Francis (1969) [1840]. The Railways of Great Britain and Ireland practically described and illustrated (3rd ed.). Newton Abbot: David & Charles. ISBN 0-7153-4786-1.
