= Rawyards railway station =

Disused railway station in Rawyards, North Lanarkshire

Rawyards

General information
- Location: Rawyards, North Lanarkshire; Scotland
- Coordinates: 55.8752°N 3.9717°W
- Grid reference: NS767664
- Platforms: 1

Other information
- Status: Disused

History
- Original company: Ballochney Railway
- Pre-grouping: Monkland Railways; North British Railway
- Post-grouping: London and North Eastern Railway

Key dates
- March 1845: Opened
- 1 May 1930: Closed
Location

Rawyards railway station served the area of Rawyards, North Lanarkshire, Scotland, from 1845 to 1930 on the Ballochney Railway.

== History ==
The station was opened in March 1845 by the Ballochney Railway. Opposite the platform was the western signal box, which was known as 'Rawyards West', and to the northeast was the Eastern signal box. Both of them opened on 1888. The eastern signal box controlled access to the goods yard and Rawyards Wagon Works. It was also known as Clarkston Junction in the 1867 edition of the handbook of stations. The station closed on 1 May 1930.

Preceding station	Disused railways	Following station
Airdrie Leaend; Line and station closed	Ballochney Railway	Clarkston (Lanarkshire); Line and station closed
