= Commonhead railway station =

Disused railway station in Airdrie, North Lanarkshire

Coordinates: 55.87250°N 3.98770°W

Commonhead (Airdrie North) railway station, was a railway station in Airdrie, Scotland. It was built in 1828, as part of the Ballochney Railway. it was later served after a series of mergers by the North British Railway. The suffix of Airdrie North was not added until 1886. It closed on 1 May 1930.

Preceding station	Disused railways	Following station
Terminus	North British Railway; Hallcraig Street branch	Airdrie Hallcraig Street; Line and station closed
