= Airdrie Hallcraig Street railway station =

Disused railway station in Airdrie, North Lanarkshire

Airdrie Hallcraig Street

General information
- Location: Airdrie, North Lanarkshire; Scotland
- Coordinates: 55.867°N 3.9786°W
- Grid reference: NS762655
- Platforms: 1

Other information
- Status: Disused

History
- Original company: North British Railway
- Pre-grouping: North British Railway

Key dates
- 26 December 1844: Opened
- 1 June 1871: Closed
Location

Airdrie Hallcraig Street railway station served the town of Airdrie, North Lanarkshire, Scotland from 1844 to 1871 on the Hallcraig Street branch.

== History ==
The station opened on 26 December 1844 by the North British Railway. It closed on 1 June 1871 but remained open as a goods station until 1964. Nothing remains today.

Preceding station	Disused railways	Following station
Commonhead; Line and station closed	North British Railway; Hallcraig Street branch	Terminus
