= Airdrie Leaend railway station =

Disused railway station in Airdrie, North Lanarkshire

Airdrie Hallcraig Street

General information
- Location: Airdrie, North Lanarkshire; Scotland
- Coordinates: 55°52′19″N 3°59′44″W
- Platforms: 1

Other information
- Status: Disused

History
- Original company: Monkland Railways
- Pre-grouping: Monkland Railways

Key dates
- 8 August 1828: Opened
- 1843: Closed
Location

Airdrie Leaend railway station served the town of Airdrie, North Lanarkshire, Scotland from 1828 to 1843 on the Hallcraig Street branch.

== History ==
The station opened on 8 August 1828 by the Monkland Railways. It was situated on a siding. Garden Square was built in 1830, which was a local village for railway workers. The station closed in 1843. Nothing remains.
