= Ballochney Railway =

Early railway line in Scotland

The Ballochney Railway was an early railway built near Airdrie, North Lanarkshire, Scotland. It was intended primarily to carry minerals from coal and ironstone pits, and stone quarries, in the area immediately north and east of Airdrie, to market, predominantly over the adjoining Monkland and Kirkintilloch Railway. Passengers were carried later.

Trains were pulled by horses at first, although locomotives were employed later on. The mineral extraction was located in high ground and rope-worked inclines were incorporated into the line to bring loaded wagons down. The line used the track gauge of 4 feet 6 inches (1,370 mm), which was already in use on the Monkland and Kirkintilloch line.

It opened in 1828, and in 1848 it amalgamated with two associated railways, forming the Monkland Railways. All of the route is now closed, although much of it can still be discovered.

== Origins ==
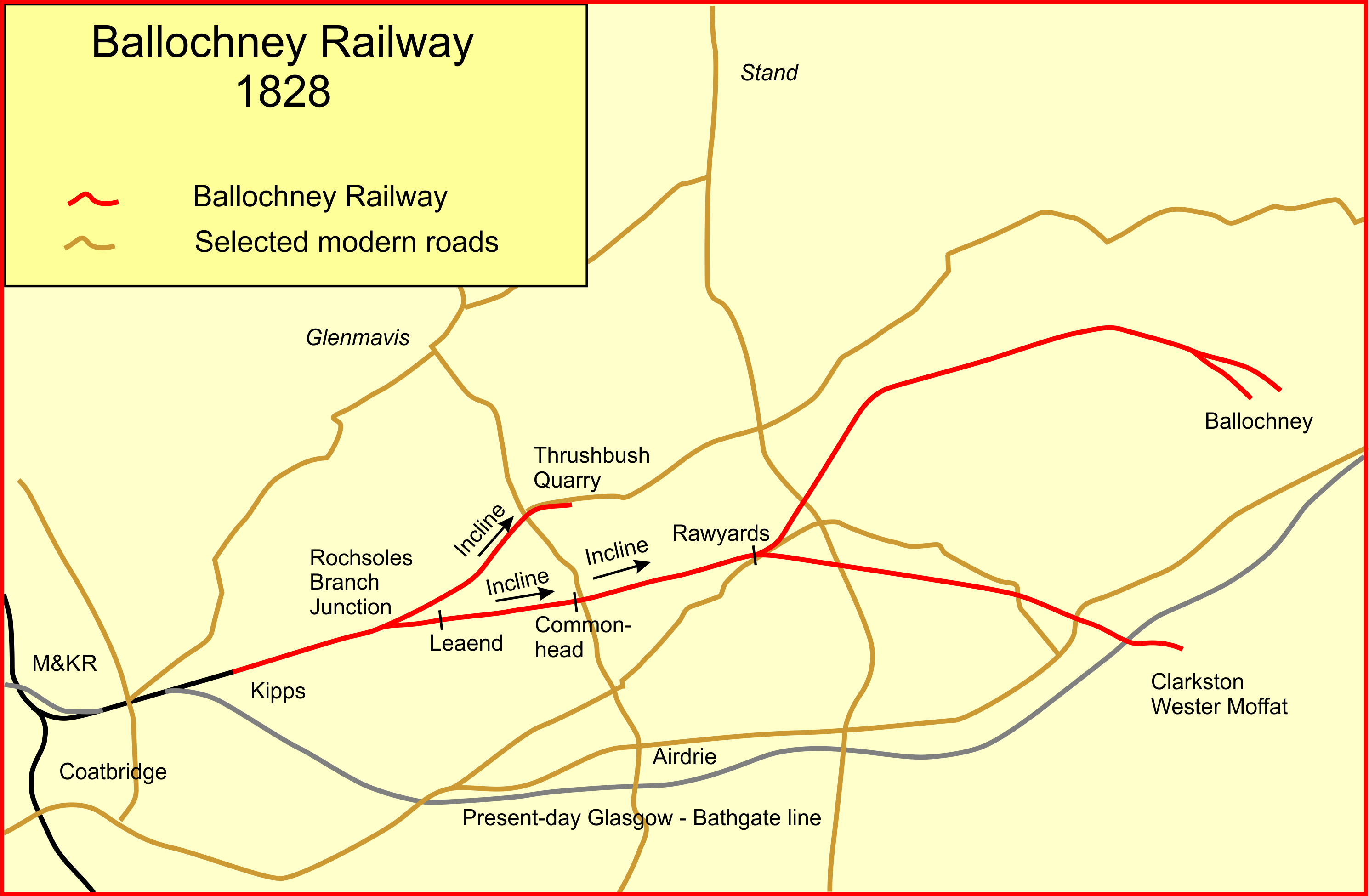
The Ballochney Railway System in 1828

In 1794 the Monkland Canal was completed, enabling the cheap transport of coal from the Monklands coalfields, south of Airdrie, to the households and industries of Glasgow. Advantageous at first, in time the canal was accused of exploiting its monopoly, and in 1824 the Monkland and Kirkintilloch Railway (M&KR) was opened, connecting the coalfields to the Forth and Clyde Canal at Kirkintilloch; onward conveyance by canal barge from there to Glasgow and Edinburgh was possible.

Ironstone was also smelted on a small scale at first, and from 1828 James Beaumont Neilson developed the hot blast process of iron smelting, and iron manufacture quickly became a huge industry, centred on Coatbridge, and the M&KR found itself at the centre of this massive industry, connected at first to all the local sources of coal and iron, and to the ironworks.

Ballochney Railway Act 1826
- Act of Parliament
- Parliament of the United Kingdom
- Long title: An Act for making a Railway from Arbuckle and Ballochney, in the Parish of New Monkland, in the County of Lanark, to or near the Termination of the Monkland and Kirkintilloch Railway, at Kipps or Kippbyres, also in the said Parish of New Monkland and County of Lanark.
- Citation: 7 Geo. 4. c. xlviii

Dates
- Royal assent: 5 May 1826

Coal was already extracted on a small scale in New Monkland, north and east of Airdrie and not directly accessible to the M&KR, and Thomas Grainger, the engineer of the M&KR, prepared a pamphlet proposing a railway from the New Monkland pits to connect with the M&KR. Construction was promised to be cheap, and the Ballochney Railway Act 1826 (7 Geo. 4. c. xlviii) of 5 May 1826 authorised the construction by a new company, the Ballochney Railway Company, with share capital of £18,425 and borrowing powers of £10,000.

The Ballochney Railway was to connect the pits to the M&KR at an end-on junction at Kipps, between Coatbridge and Airdrie. Money was scarce at the time, and the Forth and Clyde Canal company had agreed to subscribe for stock in February 1826. £3,300 was subscribed by English investors. The engineer was to be Grainger.

As was usual, the act laid down maximum toll rates for the railway: "For all Goods, Wares, Merchandize [sic], Coal and other Things: 3d per Ton, per Mile. For passing up or down any one of the Inclined Planes, or for any part of one, and for every Inclined Plane, 6d in addition."

Four contracts were let to construct the line from Kipps on the M&KR to "Airdrie Depot", i.e. the Leaend depot near Mosside Farm; from there to the top of the inclined plane at Rawyards; from there to Ballochney; and the Clarkston branch. A branch to Whiterigg and Stanrigg (Note: These places were spelt Whiterig and Standrig in documents at the time) had been authorised in the Ballochney Railway Act 1826, but it was not made at this time.

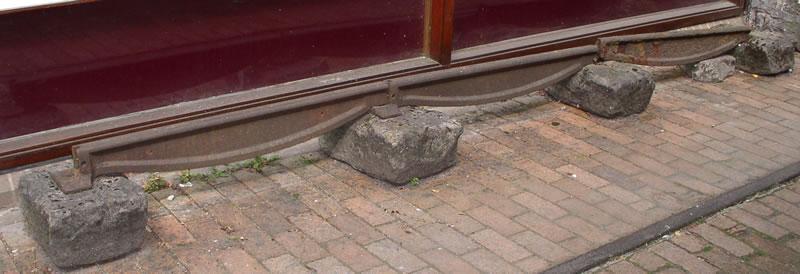
Fishbelly rail from the Cromford and High Peak Railway

Birkinshaw's patent malleable rails were ordered, as used on the M&KR. These had been a considerable technological advance on the cast iron rails used previously. The rails were 20 lb/yd (10 kg/m) and 15 feet (4.6 m) long, but there was a subsequent change to 28 lb/yd (14 kg/m) and 18 feet (5.5 m) long. This change may reflect improvements in manufacturing capability, which must have been at its technical limit at the time.

== Opening ==
Describing the railway, Hill & Buchanan (1832) says that "It was commenced in the summer of 1826 and opened to the public on 8 August 1828", but Martin states authoritatively that this represents the final completion of the construction of the whole line. "Revenue-earning traffic on the railway actually commenced very much earlier, on 12 November 1827" although this may only have been over a short distance from Kipps Colliery to the junction with the M&KR.

The line was about 6 miles (10 km) in extent, and it included two self-acting inclined planes to gain altitude in reaching the high ground where the mines were located.

== Operation ==
The railway operated like a toll road; independent hauliers were permitted to place wagons on the line and haul them with their own horses to the destination, paying the company a toll for the facility. The track used edge rails, in which the wagon wheels had flanges for guidance (as opposed to a plateway, where plain wheels run on the flat of an L-shaped plate) so that the wagons were specific to railway use, and the company hired wagons to the hauliers. Whishaw recorded that there were 270 wagons in use on the system, each weighing about 24 cwt (1200 kg); the horses in use belonged to the coal proprietors, not the railway itself. Wagon rental to hauliers accounted for 8.4% of the company's revenue in the first seven years.

On 1 January 1830 the motive power owned by the company was entirely equine, consisting of Hector, Dick, Captin [sic], Darling, Prince, Diamond, Rattler, Brisk and Poney [sic]. (Independent traders had their own stable.) These horses worked through as far as Kirkintilloch on the M&KR system, but when the M&KR acquired locomotives in 1831 that railway worked trains over the Ballochney system as far as the foot of the inclines. In 1832 the company disposed of its horses, leaving all the horse power provision to independent hauliers.

Hill & Buchanan (1832) says that "A useful contrivance, [represented in an engraving in the original], has been here adopted for the ease of the animal in descending; instead of causing it to run behind the waggon, a carriage is made, in which the horse stands at his ease all the time the waggons are descending, and starts perfectly fresh to his task of drawing them back. This plan was first practised in North America on the Mauchunk Railway." The reference is to the Mauch Chunk Switchback Railway.

This system was still in use on 21 July 1841, when a child called Margaret McWakenshaw "unloosed a horse-carriage from a train of waggons" and was injured when then trying to prevent it running away down the line.

In 1836 the maintenance of the track was put out to contract.

The company became relatively prosperous: even in 1831 it paid a dividend of 1 1/2%, and 4% the following year. In the period 1838 to 1842 it was paying dividends of 14–16%, and when the connecting Slamannan Railway was promoted, the Ballochney company was able to contribute half the capital for that line.

Writing in 1842, Whishaw states that the line had been chiefly worked by horses, but had then been prepared for locomotive operation on the upper section of about 2.5 miles (4.0 km); it had an inclination of 1 in 70. The preparation involved installing heavier rails, for the upper section now had 54 lb/yd (27 kg/m) rails compared with the original fishbelly rails of 20 to 28 lb/yd (10 to 14 kg/m). This upper section was double track. The gauge of the railway was 4 feet 6 inches (1,370 mm), with the interval between tracks 4 feet 10 1/2 inches (1,486 mm).

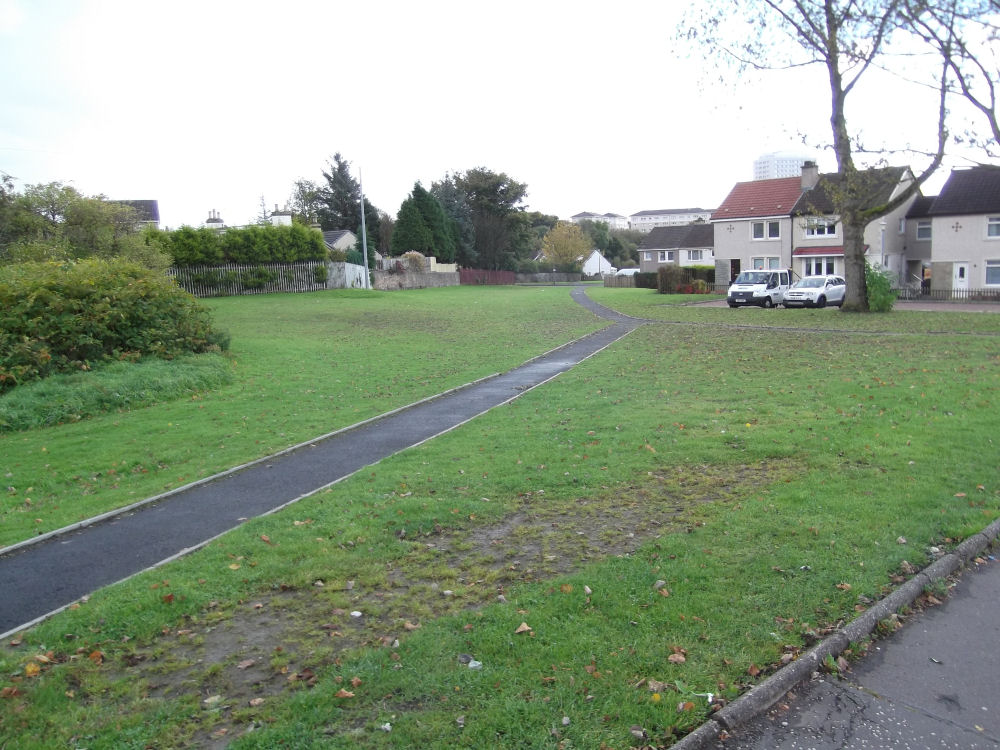
From Commonside Street towards Hallcraig Street terminus; the railway passed under Commonside Street by a bridge

The observations regarding preparation for locomotive operation seem to be contradicted by Robertson (1983): "... in spite of the powers for steam haulage in the Ballochney act, the existence of the double plane in the centre of the line shows that it was planned for horses. When it was strengthened for the introduction of locomotives in 1840, the work was only done as far as the foot of the inclines. The upper Ballochney, and the Slamannan beyond it, were for the time being left for horses". In an endnote Robertson (1983) adds, "The Ballochney main lines inclines [sic] were worked by gravity; there was also one worked by a stationary steam engine on the Rochsoles branch. Though the Garnkirk & Glasgow ran trains over the Ballochney Railway to Airdrie, they had to use horse haulage on this section."

Robertson (1983) states that locomotives were introduced on the Ballochney line in 1840.

Rates for coal and lime were 3.75d for the first mile, 1.75d for the second, 1.25 for the third, fourth and fifth miles, 0.75d for the sixth and seventh, and 0.5d thereafter. For grain and manufactured textiles, the rate was 2.75d for the first mile, and 2.25d per mile thereafter.

== Inclines ==
Whishaw describes the rope-worked incline: "There is a self-acting plane of 1,200 yards [1,100 m] in length on that portion of the line next the Monkland [and Kirkintilloch] Railway; (Note: This is sometimes described as two inclined planes, end to end) the lower part being a single way, the middle part double, and the upper part formed with three rails. The ascending train consists usually of four loaded wagons and the descending train of six or seven empty wagons; the time occupied in the ascent is 3•50 minutes; the rope used is about 4 1/2 inches [110 mm] circumference; the sheeves [sic] are of 14 inches [360 mm] diameter, and are placed at intervals of 21 feet."

Priestley states that this was a rise of 352 feet (107 m) from the junction with the M&KR to Arbuckle (on the extension which he regards as the main line).

The Garnkirk and Glasgow Railway was operating passenger trains to Leaend and complained about the safety of its passengers to the Ballochney Company:

The Conductors of the Passenger Carriages have still no notice by lights or otherwise of the approach or position of waggons coming down the "Incline", or proceeding to the Kipps, neither have they notice to avoid the waggons which are sometimes temporarily stationary on the line on their way to Kipps.

The "waggons which are sometimes temporarily stationary" seems to mean individual wagons left unattended on the running line.

There was an accident on the incline on 25 April 1859 (after the amalgamation of the Ballochney to form the Monkland Railways) and the Inquiry report describes operation of the incline. Colonel Yolland of the Board of Trade explains that the Ballochney main line has two inclines on it, with a space of about 100 yards of comparative level between them "at a place called Common Head", and that the Airdrie branch diverges there.

At the foot of the second [lower] incline, there is about 330 yards [300 m] of line used by up and down trains, and at the east and west extremities of this portion of single line there are sets of points facing to all trains descending the second incline. The construction of these inclines is also very peculiar and such as I have not hitherto met with. At the lower end of each incline, the up and down lines of railway, or rather the north and south lines of railway, since from the mode of working they are alternately used for up and down trains, are placed at an interval of about 4 feet [1.2 m] apart; but at 397 yards [363 m] from the top of the first, and 413 yards [378 m] from the top of the second incline, this interval or space is altogether done away with, and the single centre rail serves for the inner wheels of ascending or descending tracks, carriages, &c.

The two inclines are separately worked, in each case by means of a wire-rope, with a short piece of chain at each end; the loaded waggons going down the incline serving, by means of the wire-rope passing over a wheel or drum at the head of the incline, to bring up the waggons from below. Rollers are placed between the rails for supporting these wire-ropes as they are drawn up or down. The rope at the tail of each descending train being cast off, as soon as the train reaches the comparatively level portion of line at the foot of each incline, and before it descends so low as to foul the upper end of the wire-rope at the wheel or drum.

The mineral traffic is sent down the inclines in trucks, without the assistance of a locomotive engine in front; but all the passenger traffic and the goods traffic proceeding from Rawyards to Airdrie is preceded by a locomotive.

Two breaksmen or inclinemen go down the inclines with every mineral train; and all passenger trains, if not consisting of more than six vehicles, have one break in front and another in rear of the train, independent of the break on the tender. The goods trains usually have a separate breaksman, besides the two inclinemen, and this breaksman, whose duty it is to assist in shunting the goods trains, generally rides down on the engine.

The waggons belonging to the Monkland Railway are said to be mostly provided with breaks, but a large proportion of those, not belonging to the Company, are said to be without them. In such cases spraggs of wood are used to skid the wheels when trains are descending the inclines.

There are three passenger trains from Glasgow to Airdrie, two from Airdrie to Glasgow, and two each way between Bathgate and Airdrie, in the course of each day.

The actual accident being reported on took place when a locomotive descending the upper incline cast off the rope at the foot, but was pushed by the weight of wagons behind onto the lower incline without being able to attach the rope for that incline.

== The route ==
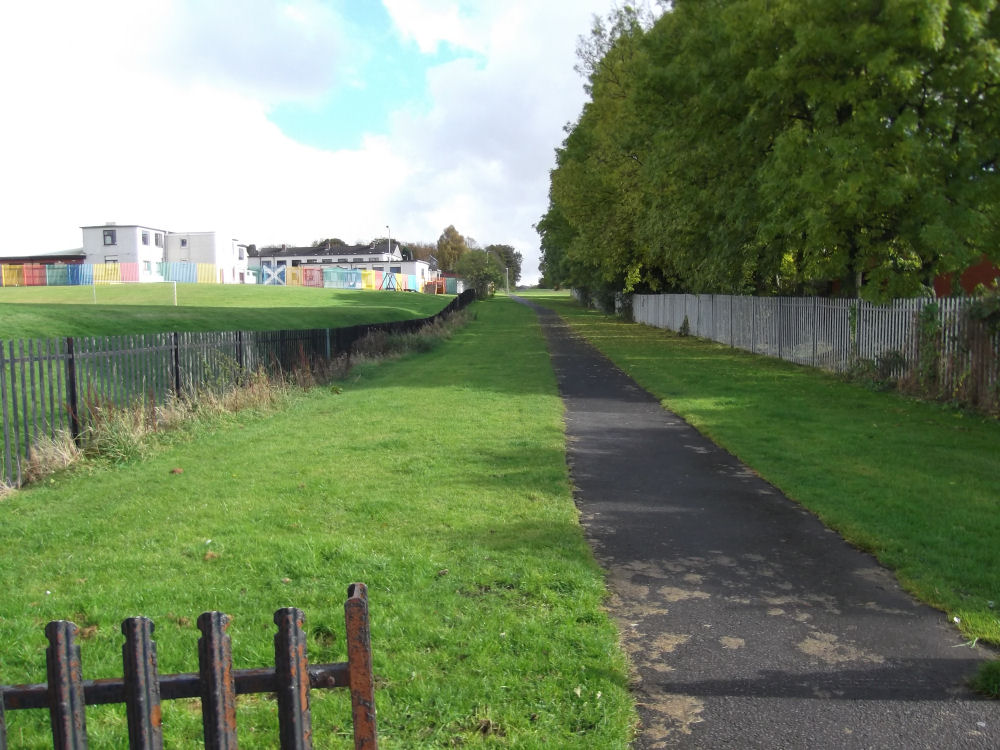
Looking up the Ballochney incline from Whinhall Road

=== System at opening ===
Main line: From Kipps, the Ballochney Railway route ran east about a quarter of a mile [400 m] to Kipps Junction, where it forked to short diverging lines on both sides to coal and ironstone pits. It continued, climbing on an easterly course, and forked at Rochsoles Branch Junction in undeveloped ground north of Leaend Burn. The main line continued on a rope-worked incline at gradients of 1 in 27 and then 1 in 23, and passed under Whinhall Road near Leaend Road; there was a passenger platform, called Airdrie Leaend here from 1828 to 1843. (Note: Some sources refer to the station simply as Leaend. Cobb and some others show this as a short branch line, but there is no evidence for this; Howie is clear that it was simply a platform alongside the main line.)

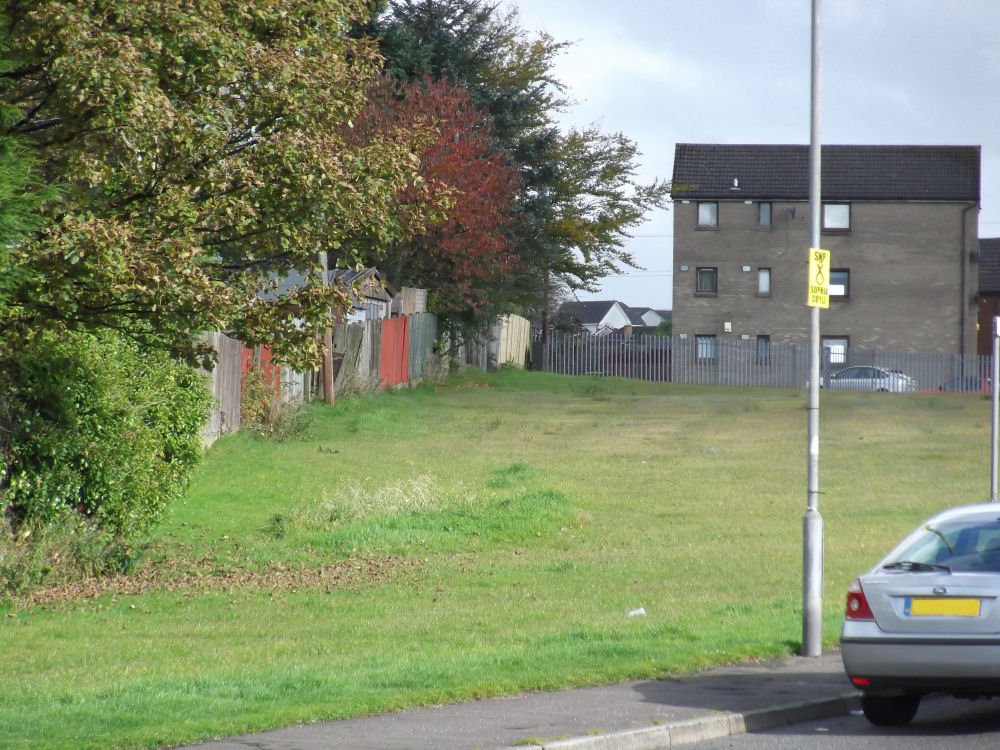
The Thrushbush Incline rising from Glenmavis Road; the railway passed under the road by a bridge

The line passed under Commonside Street and continued to climb on a rope-worked incline, at gradients of 1 in 20, 1 in 22 and 1 in 23½ to Rawyards, where there was a siding group and the line forked again; the main line passed on north-easterly, running north of Airdriehill Farm:

From the point at Raw Yards the main line advances to the north-west [sic] about 2 miles [3.2 km], embracing Raw Yards North Colliery and other properties containing valuable minerals. It then turns eastwards about half a mile [800 m] farther ... from this point the railway continues in an easterly direction about 1 1/4 miles [2.0 km], and terminates at the extensive colliery of Ballochney. The whole length of the railway is four miles and a furlong [6.6 km], and of the branches 1 1/2 miles [2.4 km].

Ballochney Colliery was south of the present-day Ballochney Road, in Plains.

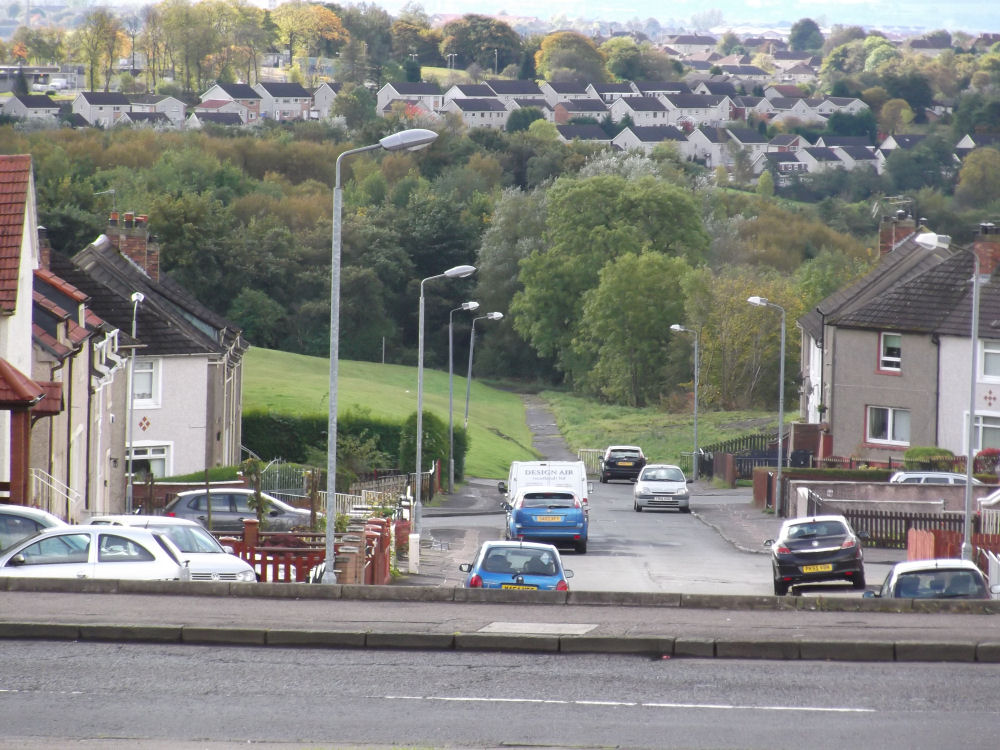
Looking down the Thrushbush incline from Glenmavis Road; the railway passed under the road by a bridge

The Thrushbush branch (Note: Thrushbush is the spelling used in the nineteenth century for what is now called Thrashbush) diverged towards the north-east at Rochsoles Branch Junction and climbed immediately on another rope-worked incline, crossing under Glenmavis Road to Thrushbush Quarry at the present Dykehead Road.

The line was often referred to as the Rochsoles branch. It climbed at gradients of 1 in 20, 1 in 22 and 1 in 23½.

Clarkston branch: at Rawyards, a branch diverged on a south-easterly course to Clarkston (originally Clerkston), terminating at Burnhead Road there.

Hill & Buchanan (1832), referring to Raw Yards says "At this point a branch, about 1 1/4 miles [2.0 km] in length, goes off to the south-east, embracing Raw Yards South Colliery and the lands of Colliertree, and terminating at West Moffat Colliery, belonging to Dr. Clerk, where it crosses the Edinburgh and Glasgow road about 1 3/4 miles [2.8 km] east of Airdrie."

This locality is close to the North Calder Water near Katherine Park Lane. A long tramway ran eastwards from that pit to a malleable iron works at Gartness.

Priestley refers to "a branch to the Brownside and Blackrig Coal Pits, near the village of Clerkston, and called the Clerkston branch, of one mile and a quarter in length".

=== Extensions ===
Whiterigg: the short branch to Whiterigg was authorised in the Ballochney Railway Act 1826, but not built at first. As ironstone and colliery workings developed rapidly in this period, it was argued that the Whiterigg branch would be very beneficial, and it was constructed in 1830, bringing the total network mileage to 5 1/2 miles [8.9 km].

Hill & Buchanan (1832) describes this: "A branch about half a mile [800 m] in length goes off to the north-west to embrace the extensive colliery of Whiterig, and which has been recently extended to the ironstone mines of Gavil and others."

Arbuckle: in 1830, another branch was opened, extended from Airdriehill Junction, near the farm of that name, to Arbuckle station; at that point there was an end-on junction with the Slamannan Railway when it opened on 5 August 1840 to the Union Canal at Causewayend, near Linlithgow.

Dalmacoulter: The Thrushbush line was extended in 1843, continuing to climb to the engine house at the site of the present-day Broompark Crescent, and then Dalmacoulter Quarry, which was on the east side of Stirling Road.

Hallcraig Street branch: Opened on 26 December 1844, from a junction where the main line passed under Commonside Street, the southerly branch ran to Hallcraig Street depot, in Airdrie, and this became the Airdrie passenger terminal also. In 1857 a handsome station building was made. As of 2013 the location was the site of Hallcraig Street pay-and-display car park. The gradient was mostly level, with a short distance at the end at 1 in 150 down.

By 1859 the branch had several short branches to pits on the north side of Airdrie: to Chapelside Pit (near Wellington Street); to Exhibition Pit (in the angle of North Bridge Street and Chapel Street); and Millfield Pit (near the present-day Upper Mill Street). There was also one long branch: the Drumbathie branch railway, running eastwards parallel to the present Kirkness Street to coal and ironstone pits near the Stirling Road in what is now Rawyards Park.

== Passengers ==
The Ballochney Railway did not run passenger services on its own account; and a bye-law of 1836 permitted passenger traffic by third parties only if written permission had been obtained.

However, a horse-drawn passenger coach operated from Leaend (sometimes spelt Lea End) to Kirkintilloch on 8 July 1828, operated by the Monkland and Kirkintilloch Railway.

The company received a demand for government duty of 3d a mile as a result; evidently this took them by surprise for Thomas Grahame wrote to the Stockton and Darlington Railway directors asking them about the duty. Grainger described the operation as "a springless coach with accommodation for thirty passengers".

The Garnkirk and Glasgow Railway (G&GR) operated a passenger service from their Townhead terminal in Glasgow to the Leaend station, running over the M&KR line and joining the Ballochney line at Kipps. Bradshaw's Guide shows, in a section headed Garnkirk and Glasgow Railway, passenger trains from Glasgow to Airdrie, &c, at 7½ and 10½ a.m., 1½ and 4½ p.m. Airdrie to Glasgow, &c, 8¾ and 11¾ a.m., 2¾ and 5¾ p.m. Fares, Glasgow and Airdrie 1s. 0d.— 6d.

The G&GR operated it by locomotives as far as Garngaber, but the M&KR refused to allow the G&GR engines over their line, so it was horse-operated (from local contractors) from there to Leaend, calling at "The Howes" in Coatbridge.

In the summer of 1832 there was a weekly service from Clarkston to Townhead; an advertisement read:

A Railway Carriage starts from Clarkston and Cairnhill Bridge every Wednesday at a quarter to 8 o'clock A.M. and returns with the evening train from the Railway Depot.

It appears that these two coaches, from Clarkston on the Ballochney Railway and Cairnhill on the M&KR joined with the Leaend to Townhead train. However a second advertisement, on 15 October 1832, announced that these carriages were discontinued.

The Slamannan Railway opened on 30 July 1840, extending eastwards from the Ballochney Railway at Arbuckle (Note: Butt says that Arbuckle station did not open until 31 August 1840.) to Causewayend, near Linlithgow, on the Union Canal, giving onward access to Edinburgh. The Slamannan company instituted a passenger service from 4 August 1840 between Edinburgh and Glasgow. Passengers could leave the Union Canal basin at Port Hopetoun in Edinburgh by boat, and transfer to a Slamannan train at Causewayend; the train then ran to Townhead in Glasgow, successively traversing the Slamannan line, the Ballochney, the Monkland and Kirkintilloch and the Garnkirk and Glasgow Railways. The journey time was about four hours—about the same as the stage coach journey.

The service was operated by Slamannan engines and Garnkirk and Glasgow coaches loaned to them. Thus for a while the Ballochney company carried the principal passenger service between Edinburgh and Glasgow over its Commonhead rope-worked inclines and track with stone block sleepers. This came to an end on 21 February 1842 when the Edinburgh and Glasgow Railway opened; it was a well-engineered main line directly serving the two cities. From that time the Ballochney passenger operations were purely local.

The Monkland and Kirkintilloch Railway resumed a passenger service on 26 December 1844, running through to the Hallcraig Street station in Airdrie, with an intermediate station at Commonhead Street. (Butt says that Hallcraig Street had been open to passengers from 8 July 1828, but seems to be a mistake; he also lists Commonhead, not Commonhead Street.)

Rawyards had a passenger service from 1845.

Receipts from this passenger traffic in the years 1842–1844 came to £806, amounting to 2.5% of gross receipts. The average speed of passenger trains was 12 mph (19 km/h) compared with 5 mph (8 km/h) for goods trains.

Fares in 1844–1845 are quoted as 0.8d, 0.5d and 0.4d per mile in first, second and third class accommodation respectively.

The Ballochney Railway started a passenger service from a new station in Airdrie, at Hallcraig Street, on 26 December 1844. The service ran to a "Kirkintilloch" station adjacent to the Edinburgh and Glasgow Railway (E&GR) station at Garngaber, near Lenzie. Connections for Edinburgh and Glasgow could be made there by changing trains. The company procured seven second-hand coaches from the Midland Railway for the purpose.

Through operation was not yet possible because the two companies had different track gauges. However the train service was suspended on 26 and 27 July 1847, when the Ballochney and the M&KR altered their track gauge to standard. The following day the Airdrie trains ran through to Glasgow Queen Street over the E&GR line.

== Joint operation ==
The highly successful period from the opening came to and end in the first half of the 1840s, and all the "coal railways" began to think of economies, and of amalgamation. A first step was implemented on 29 March 1845 when the Ballochney Railway, the Slamannan Railway, and the Monkland and Kirkintilloch Railway operated together jointly, with co-ordinated tolls and a single management, referred to as the Monkland Mineral Lines. The Garnkirk and Glasgow Railway was no longer considered an ally.

Transfer of minerals to the network of the Edinburgh and Glasgow Railway (E&GR) system assumed increasing importance, and a connection was made in this period from the M&KR at Garngaber and from the Slamannan beyond Causewayend. As the track gauge was incompatible, trans-shipping was necessary at those places. A sale of the Monkland lines to the E&GR became an objective, and the E&GR had an expansionist policy, and the E&GR took over the working of the three Monkland Mineral Lines, and also the Wishaw and Coltness Railway from 1 January 1846.

The E&GR board now wanted to proceed with a takeover of the Mineral Lines, as well as the Wishaw and Coltness line, the Scottish Central Railway, and the Forth and Clyde Canal, the Union Canal, and the Monkland Canal. However E&GR shareholders considered proposed terms of the takeover to be far too generous to the Scottish proprietors. At the same time, Parliament was opposed to amalgamation unless this resulted in considerably reduced tolls to users. In July Parliament rejected the proposals.

The Monkland Mineral Lines presented a petition to Parliament in the following year, 1847, trying to resurrect the scheme for amalgamation among themselves, but this time the E&GR opposed the bill; the mood within the E&GR had changed considerably and the entire board of directors had changed, and the board now had a hostile view of the Monkland lines. The hostility had led to the E&GR giving notice to cease the working arrangement of January 1846, and in August 1847 the Monkland Mineral Lines reluctantly resumed working their own railways. The reluctance extended as far as suing the E&GR for compliance with the agreement to work the lines, but this eventually proved abortive.

== Change of gauge ==
Ballochney Railway Act 1846
- Act of Parliament
- Parliament of the United Kingdom
- Long title: An Act to enable the Ballochney Railway Company to improve the Gauge of their Rails.
- Citation: 9 & 10 Vict. c. civ

Dates
- Royal assent: 26 June 1846

By 1846 it had become obvious that the "coal railways" had to change their track gauge to the standard gauge, in order to transfer loaded wagons to and from other railways. The Ballochney Railway obtained authorisation to do so by the Ballochney Railway Act 1846 (9 & 10 Vict. c. civ) of 26 June 1846. The company changed its gauge on 26 July and 27 July 1847, but remained closed to mineral traffic until 2 August probably because of the additional work of altering the traders' siding connections.

== Amalgamation to form the Monkland Railways ==
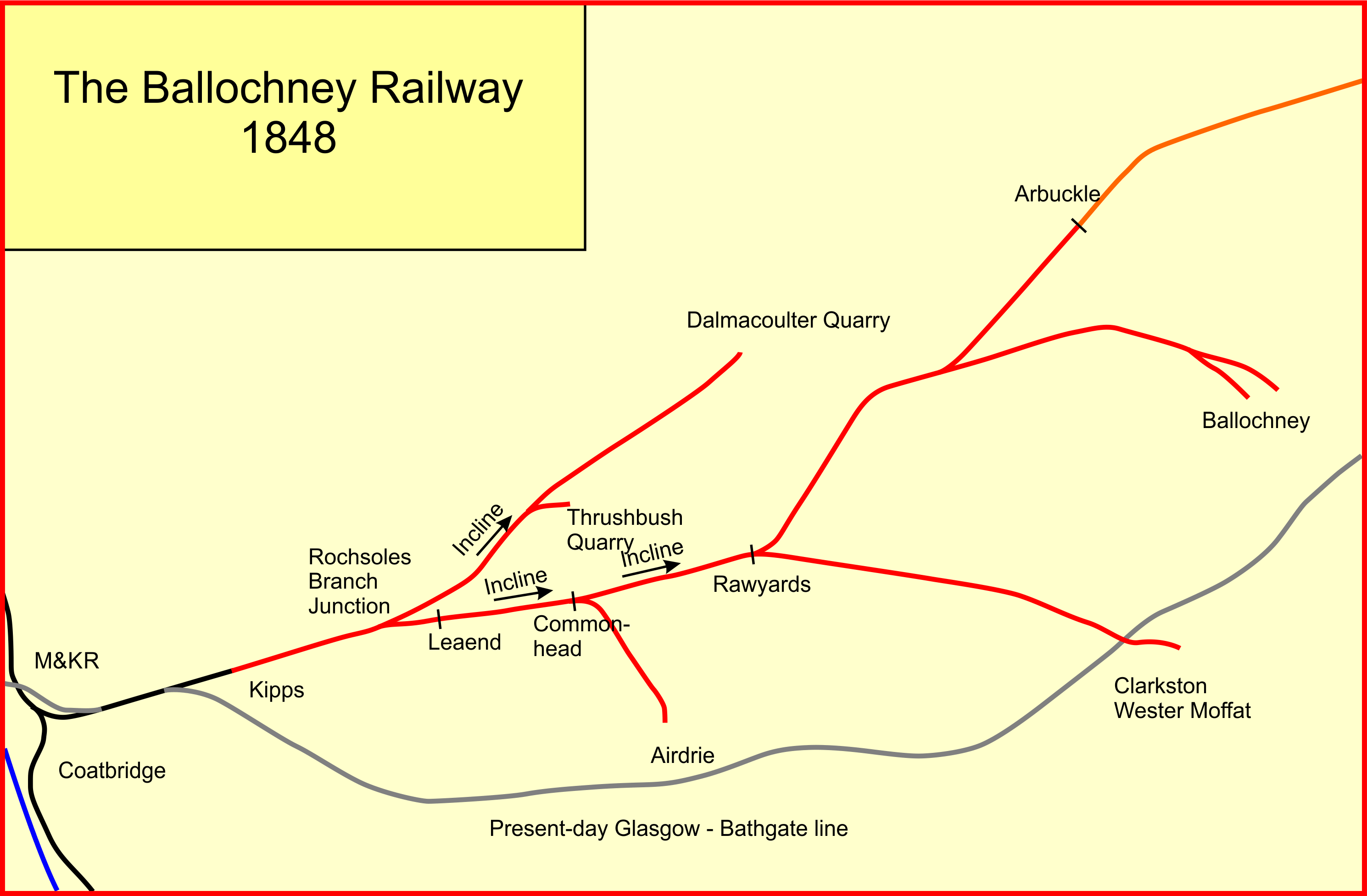
System map of the Ballochney Railway at the time of amalgamation

On 14 August 1848 the Monkland Railways Act 1848 (11 & 12 Vict. c. cxxxiv) was passed authorising the Ballochney Railway to merge with the Monkland and Kirkintilloch Railway and the Slamannan Railway to become the Monkland Railways. The three companies had been operating jointly for some years without this formality. The first Ordinary General Meeting of the Monkland Railways company took place on 6 September 1848.

The new Monkland Railways consolidated their core business of serving collieries, adding new colliery connections and building a new branch to Bathgate from the Slamannan line. The "new line" was built in 1861, closing the gap by making a direct line between Bathgate and Airdrie and Coatbridge. For a few months, this involved running up from Clarkston to Rawyards and over the Ballochney inclines, but by August 1861 the more southerly route between Plains and Coatbridge via the present-day Airdrie station was in operation.

== Subsequent history ==
The Monkland Railways were absorbed by the Edinburgh and Glasgow Railway by the Edinburgh and Glasgow and Monkland Railways Amalgamation Act 1865 (28 & 29 Vict. c. ccxvii) dated 5 July 1865, effective from 31 July 1865. A day later (on 1 August 1865) the Edinburgh and Glasgow Railway was absorbed into the North British Railway

The location of active mineral extraction changed with time as pits became exhausted and new ones opened; the former Ballochney line continued to play a part in transporting minerals for the rest of the 19th century. The inclines on the Ballochney main line converted to locomotive operation, notwithstanding the very steep gradients. The passenger service over the Arbuckle route to the Slamannan line continued, and survived until 1930. By that time nearly all the pits and quarries had closed; the few remaining terminals closed progressively. The final part of the Ballochney system was the link from Kipps to the Hallcraig Street station, which remained open for goods traffic for Airdrie until closure in 1964. (A short stub at the western extremity may have remained open until 1971.
