= Hirwaun railway station =

Former railway station in Wales

Hirwaun

General information
- Location: Hirwaun, Rhondda Cynon Taf; Wales
- Coordinates: 51.7429°N 3.5071°W
- Grid reference: SN960059
- Platforms: 3

Other information
- Status: Disused

History
- Original company: Vale of Neath Railway
- Pre-grouping: Great Western Railway
- Post-grouping: Great Western Railway

Key dates
- 24 September 1851: Opened as Hirwain
- September 1928: Renamed Hirwaun
- 15 June 1964: Closed
Location

Hirwaun is a railway station serving the village of Hirwaun in Rhondda Cynon Taf, Wales.

== History ==
The station was opened by the Vale of Neath Railway in 1851, although tramways and railways had existed in the area for at least 60+ years due to the Hirwaun Ironworks and other industries. It existed on the VoNR 7 ft (2,134 mm) Brunel gauge route between Neath and Merthyr Tydfil (1853), although the branch to Aberdare opened first in 1851.

== Operations ==
Although only a relatively small station serving an industrial community, Hirwaun was an important junction station for the VoNR. At Gelli Tarw Junction just north of the station, it merged three lines:

- Mainline from Neath to Merthyr
- Branch to Aberdare, later junctioning with the Aberdare Railway
- Dare Valley branch, initially to Bwllfa Colliery and then extended

The three platforms of the station were also supplemented by a brickworks just north of the station site. South of the station, there existed the goods yard and associated sidings, plus junctions for:

- The Hirwaun Ironworks railway
- Tower Colliery
- Penderyn quarry tramway
- Tir Herbert brickworks
- Hirwaun Common railway

Between Glynneath and Hirwaun, a distance of only 6 miles (9.7 km), there were: five collieries; two quarries; and one gunpowder/silica factory. Each had their own private sidings, all to be tackled over the steep Glynneath embankment, which required a banking locomotive for northbound trains to be attached at Glynneath. During World War II, the Royal Ordnance Factory ROF Hirwaun added to both the goods and passenger traffic load.

In 1956, the station was used by Queen Elizabeth II during her visit to the village.

== Closure ==
Taken over by the Great Western Railway on grouping in 1923, it fell victim to the Beeching Axe in 1964, with the last train running on 13 June. However, the line itself stayed in place to Aberdare on the renamed Merthyr Line, for coal trains serving Tower Colliery and a coking plant further down the valley towards Abercynon.

== Current ==
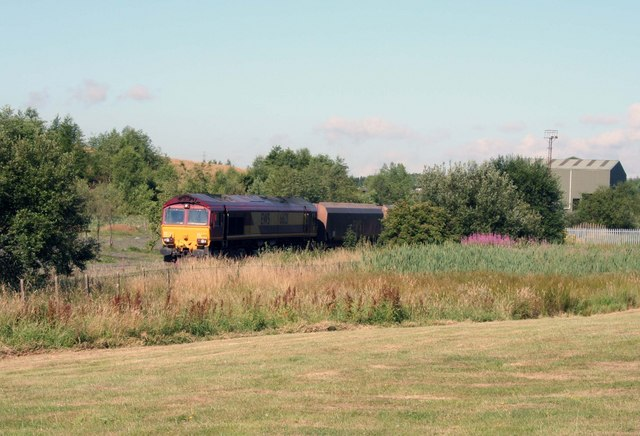
DB Cargo UK Class 66 loads coal at the Tower Colliery coal washing plant, located on the former Hirwaun railway station goods yard

There was a dedicated rail link bus that linked Aberdare with the community. It was only available to rail passengers, and operated to Penywaun, Hirwaun, Cefn Rhigos and Rhigos.

Although Tower's underground workings final ceased on 18 January 2008, DB Cargo UK continued to run trains to the Tower washery, which depart Aberdare at 7 pm on Wednesdays, and 1130 on the Thursdays, Fridays and Saturdays, most often hauled by a Class 66. This service was later taken over by Freightliner, but this service varied in schedule, again hauled by a Class 66. These services came to an end in 2017, due a reduced demand for coal, following a tightening of environmental regulations.

== Reopening ==
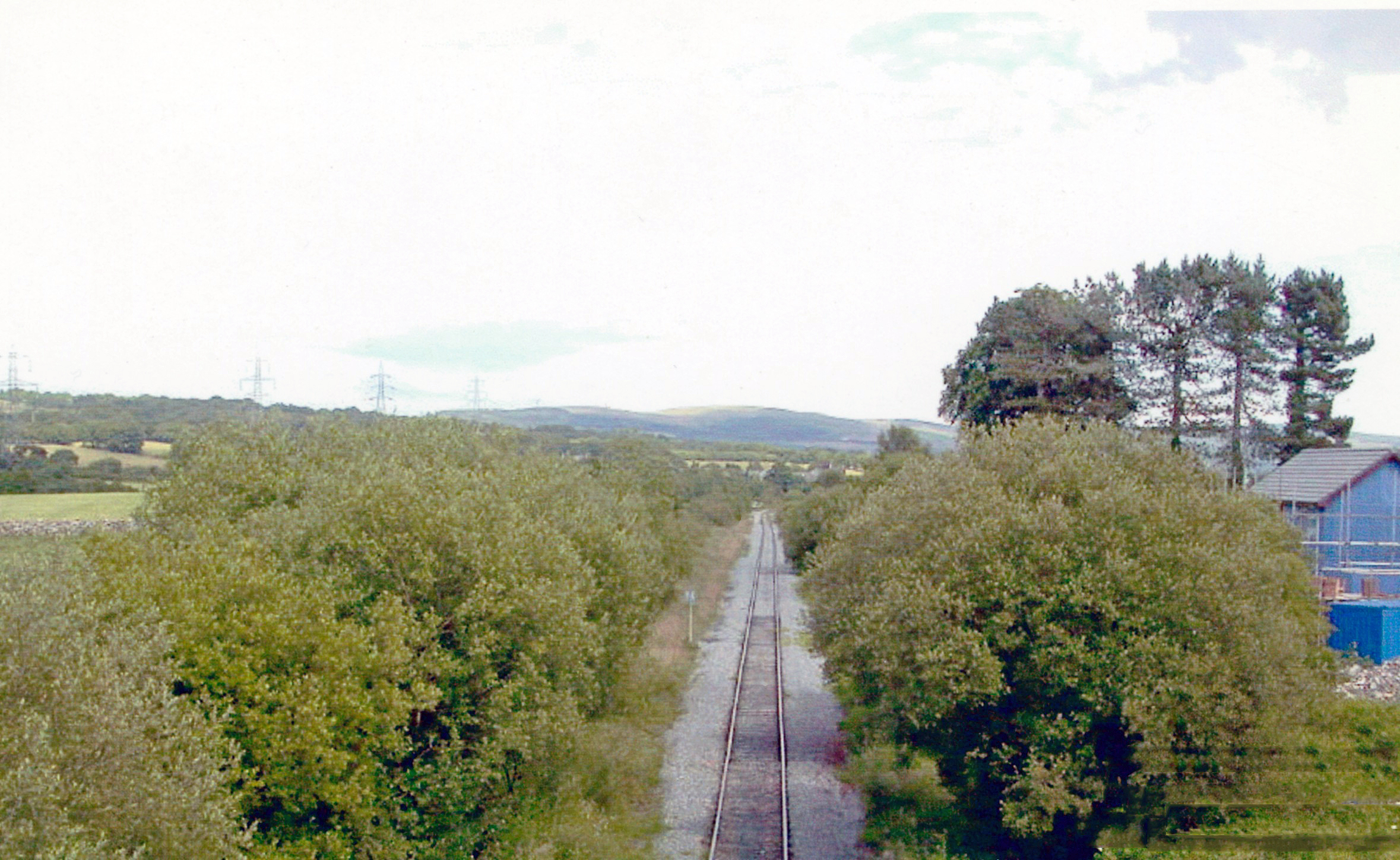
Hirwaun station on the Vale of Neath Railway.

In November 2009 the Welsh Government asked Network Rail to conduct a feasibility study on reopening the line to Hirwaun for passenger services.

It was announced in March 2011 that the Welsh Government's 2011-12 capital investment programme would include the re-opening of the line to Hirwaun as part of the Cynon Valley Scheme although the project appears to have advanced little at that time. In 2019–2020, Cardiff Capital Region City Deal's Transport Authority secured £100,000 of funding from the Welsh Government's Local Transport Fund to undertake Welsh Transport Appraisal Guidance (WelTAG) 1 study into the feasibility of extending Aberdare Line passenger services through a reopened Hirwaun station to a new terminus serving the Tower strategic development site.

The line to this station has been identified by Campaign for a Better Transport as a priority 1 candidate for reopening.

A further extension of the line is also being considered to Cwmgwrach and onto Neath is also being considered, as part of the consultation for the Swansea Bay Metro Scheme.

== Notes ==
Preceding station	Disused railways	Following station
Llwydcoed	Vale of Neath Railway; Mainline to Merthyr High Street, 1853	Rhigos Halt
Trecynon Halt	Vale of Neath Railway; Aberdare branch to Aberdare, 1851	Terminus
Black Lion Crossing	Aberdare Railway (Taff Vale Railway)	Terminus
