= Pontwalby Halt railway station =

Disused railway station in Pont Walby, Rhondda Cynon Taf

Pontwalby Halt

General information
- Location: Pont Walby, Glamorganshire; Wales
- Coordinates: 51.7459°N 3.6035°W
- Grid reference: SN893064
- Platforms: 2

Other information
- Status: Disused

History
- Original company: Great Western Railway
- Pre-grouping: Great Western Railway
- Post-grouping: Great Western Railway

Key dates
- 1 May 1911: Opened
- 15 June 1964: Closed
Location

Pontwalby Halt railway station served the area of Pont Walby, in the historical area of Glamorganshire, Wales, from 1911 to 1964 on the Vale of Neath Railway.

== History ==
The station was opened on 1 May 1911 by the Great Western Railway. It replaced British Rhondda Halt. It closed on 15 June 1964.

Preceding station	Disused railways	Following station
Rhigos Halt; Line and station closed	Great Western Railway; Vale of Neath Railway	Glyn Neath; Line and station closed
