= Hirwaun Pond Halt railway station =

Disused railway station in Hirwaun, Rhondda Cynon Taf

Hirwaun Pond Halt

General information
- Location: Hirwaun, Glamorganshire; Wales
- Coordinates: 51.745840°N 3.533537°W
- Platforms: 2

Other information
- Status: Disused

History
- Original company: Great Western Railway

Key dates
- 23 July 1941: Opened
- 15 June 1964: Closed
Location

Hirwaun Pond Halt railway station served the industrial estate in Hirwaun, in the historical county of Glamorganshire, Wales, from 1941 to 1964 on the Vale of Neath Railway.

== History ==
The station was opened on 23 July 1941 by the Vale of Neath Railway. It didn't appear in the timetable as it only served the workers of the Ordnance Factory. It later closed but reopened along with the industrial estate. The station closed on 15 June 1964.

| Preceding station | Disused railways | Following station |
|---|---|---|
| Hirwaun; Line open, station closed | Vale of Neath Railway | Rhigos Halt; Line and station closed |
