= Dare Valley Country Park =

Country park in south Wales

Coordinates: 51.719°N 3.492°W

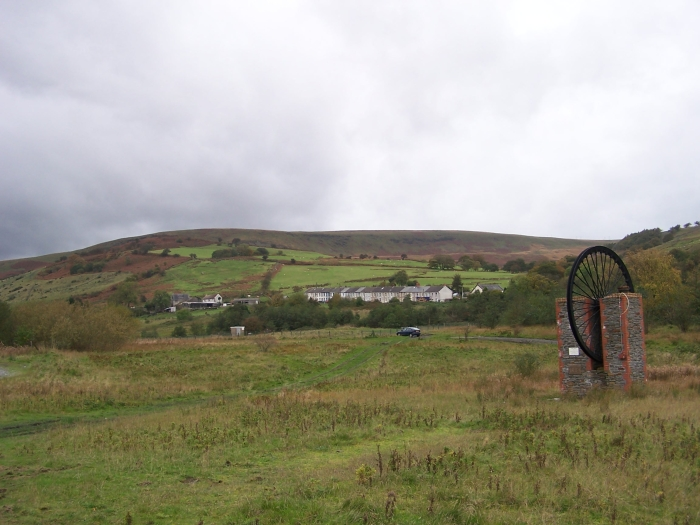
Northern view of the Park showing the former pit winding gear of Nantmelyn Colliery, which forms the centre of the memorial

Dare Valley Country Park (Welsh: Parc Gwledig Cwm Dâr) is a public park in Wales. It lies near the village of Cwmdare and the town of Aberdare, Cynon Valley, in Rhondda Cynon Taff, South Wales. It comprises 500 acres (2.0 km^{2}) of woodlands, pasture and moorland mountainside. It is maintained by the local Council, Rhondda Cynon Taf.

== Background ==
Cwmdare had four large collieries in operation during its history, all of which had closed by 1977. The Cwmdare, Merthyr Dare and Bwllfa Dare collieries were all sunk in the 1850s, while work began on Nantmelyn Colliery in 1860. Over the next 120 years, the seams in the Maerdy mountain were gradually used up, with Merthyr Dare closing in 1884, Cwmdare in 1936, Nantmelin in 1957 when coal extraction stopped in the valley. Bwllfa Dare shaft was capped in 1977, after serving for 20 years as a ventilation shaft for Mardy Colliery, located in the Rhondda Valley on the opposite side of the mountain.

Two separate railway lines operated in the area operated by rival companies. The Dare and Aman Branch of the Vale of Neath Railway reached the local Bwllfa Colliery in 1857. This railway reached Cwmdare from Gelli Tarw near Llwydcoed, crossing the Gamlyn Viaduct at Penywaun and Dare Viaduct. Both viaducts were designed by Isambard Kingdom Brunel. The second line to Cwmdare was built by the Taff Vale Railway and followed a route near the River Dare from a junction close to Aberdare. This line was opened in 1866.

== History ==
The Park was opened in December 1973, built on land reclaimed from over a century of coal mining in the area. The land reclamation took two years and involved the clearing of coal tips and re-routing of the River Dare.

There are many historical remnants of the coal mining past to be seen in the Park, including colliery coal trams, and pit winding gear which forms part of a monument in the northern part of the Park. In 1985 a Visitor Centre was established at the Park.

== Feature and Amenities ==
The Park features two artificial lakes (an upper and lower) with a cascade on the Dare down to the lower lake. The Park is open all year round and offers free car parking.

== See also ==
- Aberdare Park
