= Tyrone O'Sullivan =

Welsh trade unionist (1945–2023)

Tyrone O'Sullivan OBE
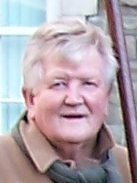
- O'Sullivan in 2006
- Born: 24 October 1945; Abercwmboi, Wales
- Died: 27 May 2023 (aged 77); Wales
- Occupation: Trade unionist
- Title: Chairman of Tower Colliery
- Spouse: Elaine O'Sullivan
- Children: 2

Tyrone O'Sullivan (24 October 1945 – 27 May 2023) was a Welsh trade unionist who was Branch Secretary of the National Union of Mineworkers (NUM) and Chairman of Goitre Tower Anthracite Ltd., the owners of Tower Colliery.

== Early life ==
O'Sullivan was born in Abercwmboi, in the heart of the South Wales coalfield, into a mining family. After he joined Tower Colliery as an apprentice electrician, in 1963 (three years before the Aberfan disaster), his father was killed at Tower Colliery in a roof collapse. His great-grandfather had also died in a mining accident; he was killed in an explosion at Mardy Colliery in 1885.

== Career ==
O'Sullivan became the Branch Secretary of the NUM branch of Tower Colliery in 1973. As an NUM activist, he became a flying picket, moving around Wales at the behest of Arthur Scargill, in the 1973 and 1974 strikes to oust Prime Minister Edward Heath's Conservative government.

=== 1984 strike ===
When National Coal Board boss Ian MacGregor announced plans to close 20 pits and do away with 25,000 jobs in 1984, the planned closure of Cortonwood provoked a movement of Yorkshire miners who appealed to other coalfields for support. In light of the lack of support from Yorkshire with regards closures in South Wales, the South Wales branch as a region voted 3:1 against a strike.

O'Sullivan explained to his members at Tower the probable result of not fighting the closures, and gained 99% support:

I phoned Emlyn Williams who was President of the South Wales area of the NUM and told him of my unease. His pit had voted for action but they were not going out on strike as they had been beaten by the area vote. I suggested something could be done. Emlyn said – do what you can, but don't tell me.

O’Sullivan led flying pickets, a highly mobile type of picketing, from Tower over the following week to every pit in the South Wales region, as a result of which the pits had met and agreed to support the 1984–85 national miners strike. O'Sullivan later led the group of miners leaders against a national ballot during the strike, as it would have needed to include the Nottinghamshire branch, who would have voted against it – its leadership later formed the breakaway Union of Democratic Mineworkers.

He disclosed on the closure of Tower Colliery that he and his family knew at the time of the strike that their private home telephone had been bugged by MI5. Throughout the strike, O’Sullivan led groups of Tower miners around the country, drumming up support for the strike – O'Sullivan later joking that during the strike he spent more time in various bedrooms around the country with Glynn Roberts (later head of Human Resources at Tower Colliery), than his wife. These actions included a group who went to the village of Wivenhoe, where a group of Tower miners went to stop overseas import coal from coming into the harbour. O’Sullivan also acknowledged the changed role of women during the strike:

It is likely that the actions of these women changed attitudes forever about the role of women. They no longer waited for their miner husbands to come home on a Friday and hand over a pay packet. Now the support they gave to the miners' cause was fundamental in the fight to save the mining communities.

A taxi driver David Wilkie was killed when his car was hit by a concrete block dropped from an over bridge, and three miners within O'Sullivan's area were implicated.

=== Goitre Tower Anthracite Ltd ===
In October 1992, the Conservative Government as part of a privatisation program of British Coal, announced closure of 31 of Britain's 50 working mines. After public outcry, the Government reviewed the status of 21 of them, with 12 temporarily reprieved, including Tower. However, in 1994, after its closure was ordered by Michael Heseltine of the Conservative government of John Major, the Tower miners decided to mount publicity campaign. It didn't work, and on 23 April 1994 British Coal announced the closure of Tower. After the mine closed, the miners retreated to the club in Penywaun and agreed to O’Sullivan's suggestion for the buyout of the mine. The deal was secured when 239 miners each paid £8,000 from their redundancy payouts to buy shares in Goitre Tower Anthracite Ltd, the vehicle which then borrowed an additional £2million to buy the pit from British Coal. The pit was reopened on 2 January 1995, after the miners led a triumphant march back to the colliery. O’Sullivan had by now been appointed personnel director of the new company. His famed 1994 quote later became a line in a locally produced opera by Welsh composer Alun Hoddinott:

We were ordinary men, we wanted jobs, we bought a pit.

O'Sullivan was probably nearer to the truth in that quote than any other reason for buying the pit, as local unemployment then was 30% in Aberdare, and would have risen to 40% had Tower and its 400 employees joined the dole queue.

=== Politics ===
O'Sullivan had been a Labour Party member since he was 16. In July 2016, he endorsed Jeremy Corbyn's campaign in Labour Party leadership election. He said of Corbyn: "He's one of the most honest, intelligent men I think I've ever met. He only wants what's best for the people... He's really a genuine socialist." O'Sullivan first met Corbyn during the miners' strike and remembers the "incredible" support from Corbyn and local campaigners. At the end of the strike, the miners gave Mr Corbyn a medallion in recognition of his help.

== Personal life and death ==
O'Sullivan lived in Mumbles with his wife, Elaine. The couple had two daughters and six grandchildren. He died on 27 May 2023, at the age of 77.

== Award ==
Appointed an Officer of the Order of the British Empire (OBE) in the 1996 New Year Honours "for services to industry in South Wales", O'Sullivan was an adviser to the now discontinued Welsh Development Agency and an Honorary Fellow of University of Wales Institute, Cardiff.

== Writings ==
- Tower of Strength, Mainstream Publishing, 29 October 2001; ISBN 1-84018-500-7

Trade union offices
Preceded by Garfield Davies	Trades Union Congress representative to the AFL-CIO; 1995	Succeeded by ?
