= Swansea Wind Street railway station =

Disused railway station in Swansea, Wales

Swansea Wind Street

General information
- Location: Swansea, Glamorganshire; Wales
- Coordinates: 51.6197°N 3.9375°W
- Grid reference: SS659929

Other information
- Status: Disused

History
- Original company: Great Western Railway
- Pre-grouping: Great Western

Key dates
- 1 August 1863: Opened
- 1 March 1873: Closed
Location

Swansea Wind Street railway station served the city of Swansea, in the historical county of Glamorganshire, Wales, from 1863 to 1873 on the Vale of Neath Railway.

== History ==
The station was opened on 1 August 1863 by the Great Western Railway. The owners of a nearby coal yard objected to it being built because it interfered with the passage of their coal trains. It closed on 1 March 1873. Services were diverted to East Dock after closure.

Preceding station	Disused railways	Following station
Danygraig Halt; Line open, station closed	Great Western Railway; Vale of Neath Railway	Swansea Victoria; Line and station closed
