= Abernant railway station =

Disused railway station in Abernant, Wales

Coordinates: 51.72143°N 3.42811°W

Abernant

General information
- Location: Abernant, Rhondda Cynon Taf; Wales
- Platforms: 1

Other information
- Status: Disused

History
- Original company: Vale of Neath Railway
- Pre-grouping: Great Western Railway
- Post-grouping: Great Western Railway

Key dates
- November 1854: Station opens
- 31 December 1962: Station closes
Location

Abernant railway station served the village of Abernant in Wales. Served by the Vale of Neath railway, the station lay at the other end of the 2497 yard Abernant Tunnel from Merthyr Tydfil.

== History ==
The station was opened by the Vale of Neath Railway in November 1854. It was designed by Isambard Kingdom Brunel as a single Broad Gauge line with a third rail added later to allow mixed gauge traffic It became part of the Great Western Railway in 1865.

By the late 19th Century, the line was described as the 'most antiquated line' of the GWR. It was quite a distance from 'Aberdare' that either required a long steep climb or hiring a cab. It was described as picturesque and convenient, it was unloved. The chairman of the local Board of Health said that due to the lack of facilities, it was a disgrace. He noted that over 300,000 passengers a year used it but there was no accommodation or toilets. Further pressure was added in June 1896 when a local newspaper suggested it be moved to the Cardiff Exhibition. As a result, facilities were improved in 1897.

The line then passed on to the Western Region of British Railways on nationalisation in 1948. The station was then closed by the British Railways Board in 1962.

== The site today ==
The platform remains on the now overgrown site.

The British Railways Western Region station sign is now on display at the Cynon Valley Museum, Aberdare.

| Preceding station | Disused railways | Following station |
|---|---|---|
| Llwydcoed | Great Western Railway; Vale of Neath Railway | Merthyr Tydfil |
