= Cardonnel Halt railway station =

Disused railway station in Skewen, Neath Port Talbot

Cardonnel Halt

General information
- Location: Skewen, Glamorganshire; Wales
- Coordinates: 51.6524°N 3.8411°W
- Grid reference: SS727964

Other information
- Status: Disused

History
- Original company: Great Western Railway
- Pre-grouping: Great Western Railway
- Post-grouping: Great Western Railway

Key dates
- 1 June 1905: Opened
- 28 September 1936: Closed
Location

Cardonnel Halt railway station served the village of Skewen, in the historical county of Glamorganshire, Wales, from 1905 to 1936 on the Swansea and Neath Railway.

== History ==
The station was opened on 1 June 1905 by the Great Western Railway. It closed on 28 September 1936.

Preceding station	Disused railways	Following station
Neath Abbey; Line and station closed	Great Western Railway; Swansea and Neath Railway	Briton Ferry Road; Line and station closed
