= Melyncourt Halt railway station =

Disused railway station in Resolven, Neath Port Talbot

Melyncourt Halt

General information
- Location: Resolven, Glamorganshire; Wales
- Coordinates: 51.702°N 3.7127°W
- Grid reference: SN817017
- Platforms: 2

Other information
- Status: Disused

History
- Original company: Great Western Railway
- Pre-grouping: Great Western Railway
- Post-grouping: Great Western Railway

Key dates
- 1 June 1905: Opened
- 15 June 1964: Closed
Location

Melyncourt Halt railway station co-served the village of Resolven, in the historical county of Glamorganshire, Wales, from 1905 to 1964 on the Vale of Neath Railway.

== History ==
The station was opened on 1 June 1905 by the Great Western Railway. It closed on 15 June 1964.

Preceding station	Disused railways	Following station
Resolven; Line and station closed	Great Western Railway; Vale of Neath Railway	Clyne Halt; Line and station closed
