= Clyne Halt railway station =

Disused railway station in Wales

Clyne Halt

General information
- Location: Clyne, Glamorganshire; Wales
- Coordinates: 51.6921°N 3.7342°W
- Grid reference: SN802006
- Platforms: 1

Other information
- Status: Disused

History
- Original company: Great Western Railway
- Pre-grouping: Great Western Railway
- Post-grouping: Great Western Railway

Key dates
- 1 June 1905: Opened
- 15 June 1964: Closed
Location

Clyne Halt railway station served the village of Clyne, in the historical county of Glamorganshire, Wales, from 1905 to 1964 on the Vale of Neath Railway.

== History ==
The station was opened on 1 June 1905 by the Great Western Railway. It closed on 15 June 1964. The line is currently only open to freight.

Preceding station	Disused railways	Following station
Melyncourt Halt; Line partially open, station closed	Great Western Railway; Vale of Neath Railway	Aberdylais; Line partially open, station closed
