= Briton Ferry Road railway station =

Disused railway station in Briton Ferry, Neath Port Talbot

Briton Ferry Road
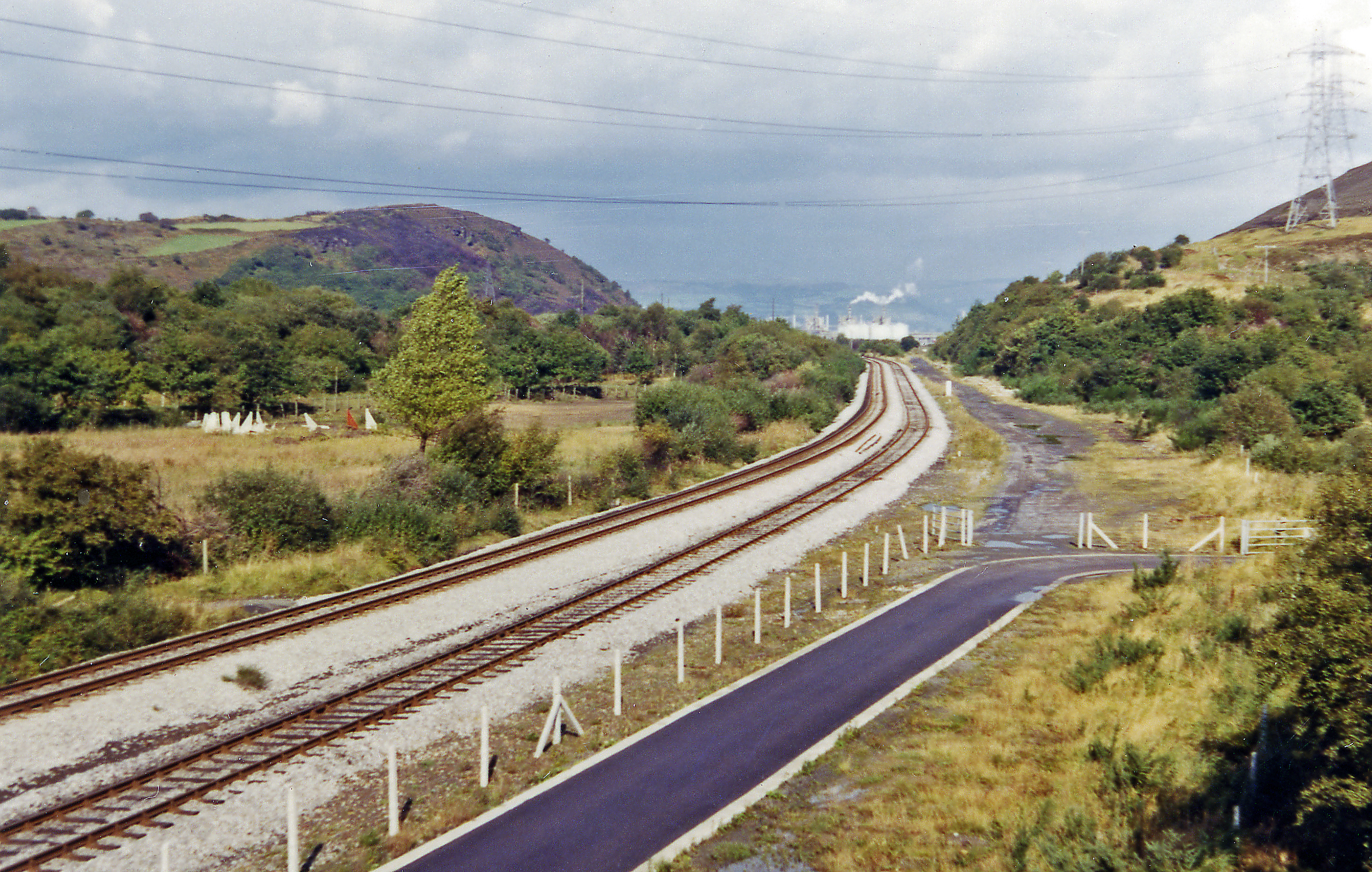
- The site of the station in 1973

General information
- Location: Briton Ferry, Glamorganshire; Wales
- Coordinates: 51.6274°N 3.8607°W
- Grid reference: SS713937
- Platforms: 2

Other information
- Status: Disused

History
- Original company: Vale of Neath Railway
- Post-grouping: Great Western Railway

Key dates
- 1 August 1863: Opened
- 1 March 1873: Closed
- 1 October 1880: Reopened
- 28 September 1936: Closed permanently
Location

Briton Ferry Road railway station served the town of Briton Ferry, in the historical county of Glamorganshire, Wales, from 1863 to 1936 on the Vale of Neath Railway. Nearby was Llandarcy Oil Refinery.

== History ==
The station was opened on 1 August 1863 by the Vale of Neath Railway. It temporarily closed on 1 March 1873 but reopened on 1 October 1880, before closing permanently on 28 September 1936.

Preceding station	Disused railways	Following station
Cardonnel Halt; Line open, station closed	Vale of Neath Railway	Danygraig Halt; Line open, station closed
Cardonnel Halt; Line and station closed	Swansea and Neath Railway	Swansea East Dock; Line and station closed
