= Trecynon Halt railway station =

Disused railway station in Trecynon, Rhondda Cynon Taf

Trecynon Halt

General information
- Location: Trecynon, Rhondda Cynon Taf; Wales
- Coordinates: 51.7258°N 3.4562°W
- Grid reference: SN995040

Other information
- Status: Disused

History
- Original company: Great Western Railway
- Pre-grouping: Great Western Railway
- Post-grouping: Great Western Railway

Key dates
- 1 May 1911: Opened
- 15 June 1964: Closed
Location

Trecynon Halt railway station served the village of Trecynon, Rhondda Cynon Taf, Wales, from 1911 to 1964 on the Vale of Neath Railway.

== History ==
The station was opened on 1 May 1911 by the Great Western Railway. It closed on 15 June 1964.

Preceding station	Disused railways	Following station
Aberdare High Level; Line and station closed	Great Western Railway; Vale of Neath Railway	Merthyr Road; Line and station closed
