= Bwllfa Colliery =

Welsh coal mine active 1856-1957

- Interactive map of Bwllfa Colliery

Location
- Location: Cwmdare, Wales; 51.7111°N 3.4920°W

Production
- Products: Ironstone, Steam coal

History
- Opened: 1853
- Active: 1856-1957
- Closed: 1977

Bwllfa Colliery was a coal mine located in the Dare valley near Cwmdare in Rhondda Cynon Taf, South Wales. It operated from 1856 to 1957, remaining open as a ventilation shaft for Mardy Colliery until 1989.

== Development ==
=== Bwllfa No.1 ===
In 1853, Sam and Joseph Thomas began sinking a pit shaft within the remote farming community at the top of the Dare Valley. The two shafts were 200 yards (180 m) deep, and initially operated by water balance winding, with ventilation from a furnace. Production commenced in 1856, but by 1857 business partner Ebenezer Lewis was the sole owner.

=== Nantmelyn Colliery ===
In 1856, Mordecai Jones began sinking the shaft of the Nantmelyn Colliery (51.714°N 3.4857°W). After opening in 1860, by 1864 the Bwllfa Colliery Company were the owners. In 1867 they sunk a second 150 yards (140 m) deep shaft, ventilated by Guibal fan. Brogden and Sons took over the colliery in 1873.

== Operations ==
In 1876, the two pits were merged under the combined Bwlfa and Merthyr Dare Coal Company. After a series of accidents criticised by the HM Inspectorate of Mines, seeking new investment the company reformed as the Bwllfa and Merthyr Dare Steam Collieries (1891) Ltd., allowing opening of the Gorllwyn level in 1891.

By 1896, No.1 pit employed 1,128, while renamed Nantmelyn now Bwllfa No.2 employed an additional 231. In 1907, the company took over the mineral rights to the old Powell's pit (also known as Pwll Troedrhiwllech and Cwmdare Pit), opened By Thomas Powell 1851, which it reopened as Bwllfa No.3.

Like many mines, the company lost some of its workforce during World War I, but by the end of 1918 this had recovered to: 1,054 at No.1; 931 at No.2/new drift No.4; 423 at No.3. Due to its ease of access, in 1922 the first electric powered coal cutting machines to be used in the South Wales coalfield were installed at Bwllfa No.3. By 1923, producing both ironstone and steam coal:

- No.1: employed 1,166 men producing from the Gorllwyn, Two Feet Nine, Four, Six and Nine Feet, Four Feet Upper and Lower, Yard and Seven Feet seams
- No.2: employed 388 producing from the Yard, Gellideg and the New seams. A further 147 men were employed on the surface, shared with No.4
- No.3: employed 690 producing from Seven Feet, Lower Yard, Gellideg and the New seams
- No.4: employed 202 producing on the New drift, and 139 producing on the Gorllwyn level

Taken over by the Bwllfa and Cwmaman Coal Co. in 1928, part of Welsh Associated Collieries, in 1935 WAC merged its mining investments with those of Powell Duffryn. The new company decided to cease production from No.3, which became a ventilation shaft.

Post World War II, by the time of nationalisation under the National Coal Board, Powell Duffryn had also ceased production at No.1, equipping it as a ventilation shaft and pumping station. Coal was now only raised from No.2 and No.4, with a total below and above ground workforce of 572.

== Housing and amenities ==
The influx of miners to what had been up to this point an isolated farming community necessitated the construction of housing to support them. Between 1853 and 1859, the first streets were laid down on the west side of the Dare Valley, which would become the centre of the village of Cwmdare. At the same time, a small collection of houses were constructed on the east side of the valley, near the Merthyr Dare Colliery, which became known as Pithead. As the collieries grew over the next century, Cwmdare grew with it, with rows of terraced miners' cottages being built to the north-west of the original hamlet to create homes for the expanding workforce. Merthyr Dare closed in 1884, and Cwmdare Colliery in 1936.

== Transport ==
Two separate railway lines operated in the area operated by rival companies. The Dare and Aman Branch of the Vale of Neath Railway reached Bwllfa Colliery in 1857. This railway reached Cwmdare from Gelli Tarw near Llwydcoed, crossing the Gamlyn Viaduct at Penywaun and Dare Viaduct, both designed by Isambard Kingdom Brunel.

In 1866, an extension by the Taff Vale Railway followed a route near the River Dare from a junction close to Aberdare.

== Closure ==
With coal being mined from under the Maerdy mountain from both sides, it was only a matter of time before the economics of production dictated the closure of one of the two mines.

In 1949 the NCB had made a £7-million investment in Mardy Colliery, creating capacity for No.3 and No.4 shafts to access 100 million tons of coal in the 5 ft seam, estimated sufficient to last for one hundred years. It had been transformed into one of the most modern pits in the United Kingdom, with fully electric winding, new extended railway sidings and a coal washing plant on the surface.

In 1957, further investment in Mardy created new underground roads linking the mine directly to Bwllfa. At this point the decision was made to stop raising coal from Bwllfa which would be kept open only for ventilation and water extraction. By 1977, workings at Mardy had moved further north and east, and the decision was made to close the last shaft at Bwllfa.

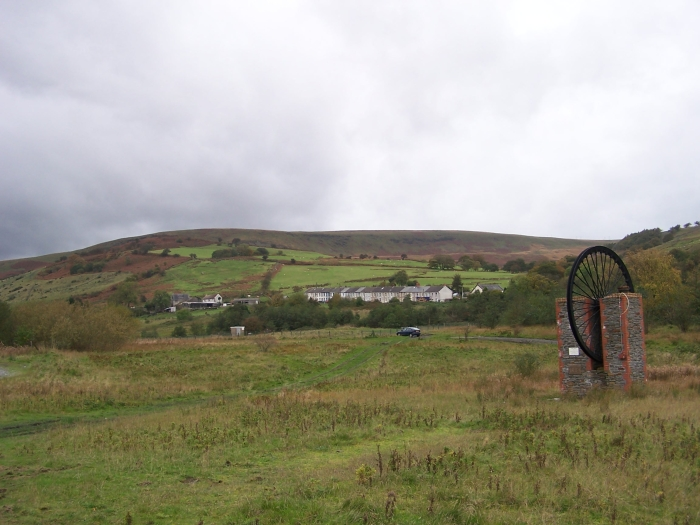
Northern view of Dare Valley Country Park, showing the former pit winding gear of Nantmelyn Colliery

== Present-day usage ==
In 1970, a country park was proposed for the area. After planning and two years of land reclamation work, involving the clearing of coal tips and re-routing of the River Dare, Dare Valley Country Park was opened in December 1973. It includes many historical remnants of the coal mining past, including coal trams and the pit winding gear from Nantmelyn Colliery which forms part of the monument.

== Legal principle ==
Sometimes courts and tribunals need to speculate on what might have happened when making a determination of damages or compensation due in response to the loss of some facility. In a 1903 decision in the case of Bwllfa and Merthyr Dare Steam Collieries (1891) Ltd v. Pontypridd Waterworks Co., the House of Lords formulated a principle known as the Bwllfa principle, which states that where the court has knowledge of what actually happened, it need not speculate as to what might have happened, but should base its decision on the known facts.
