= Rhigos Halt railway station =

Disused railway station in Rhigos, Rhondda Cynon Taf

Rhigos Halt

General information
- Location: Rhigos, Rhondda Cynon Taf; Wales
- Coordinates: 51.7498°N 3.5508°W
- Grid reference: SN930068
- Platforms: 2

Other information
- Status: Disused

History
- Original company: Great Western Railway
- Pre-grouping: Great Western Railway
- Post-grouping: Great Western Railway

Key dates
- 1 May 1911: Opened
- 15 June 1964: Closed
Location

Rhigos Halt railway station served the village of Rhigos, Rhondda Cynon Taf, Wales, from 1911 to 1964 on the Vale of Neath Railway.

== History ==
The station was opened on 1 May 1911 by the Great Western Railway. It closed on 15 June 1964.

| Preceding station | Disused railways | Following station |
|---|---|---|
| Hirwaun Pond Halt; Line and station closed | Great Western Railway; Vale of Neath Railway | Pontwalby Halt; Line and station closed |
