= Mordecai Jones =

Mordecai Jones (1813 - 30 August 1880) was a Welsh businessman and pioneer in the development of the South Wales coalfield. He was a notable promoter of the British Schools model of free education, and of Welsh and English Calvinistic Methodist churches. He became mayor of Brecon in 1854.

== Biography ==
Born in 1813, the son of a boat builder on the Monmouthshire and Brecon Canal, he was educated in Brecon at the expense of a local coal merchant.

=== Career ===
After leaving school, he took over his sponsor's business, and after adding the old Breconshire Brewery to his interests in 1841, in the same year purchased the Abergavenny Gas Works. He was later chairman of the Brecon Gas Works, from its inception until his death.

Jones developed both the Nantmelyn Colliery in Cwmdare in the Aberdare Valley from 1861, and the Mardy Colliery in the Rhondda Fach Valley in 1876. After Jones's death in 1880, the Nantmelin Colliery Company was formed to run that pit, while Mardy's lease was taken over by Locket's Merthyr Company.

=== Politics ===
Jones was mayor of Brecon from 1854. He then became deputy lieutenant for Brecknock, at which time he built Camden Cottage on land leased from the 2nd Marquis of Camden and Earl of Brecknock. It still stands today, converted to a guest house. In 1876, he became High Sheriff of Brecknockshire.

A supporter of the Welsh language, in his position as secretary of the Calvinistic Methodist ministers and elders in Brecknock, in June 1848 he drafted and co-signed a letter to J. P. Kay Shuttleworth of the Committee of Council on Education, urging that H.M. Inspectors of Schools should have a knowledge of Welsh.

=== Religion ===
A fervent Calvinistic Methodist, he was secretary to the group of Calvinistic Methodist ministers and elders in Brecknock and promoted the development of churches in both England and Wales. Jones granted ex-gratia freehold sites to all denominations on both his Mardy, and later Cwmdare sites.

=== Schooling ===
Jones was one of the chief promoters of the British and Foreign School Society in South Wales, and a financial contributor to the establishment of the Normal School in Brecon in 1846. He then became chairman of the Brecon School Board from its formation until 1879.

Jones supported the efforts of David Charles III to combine Government aid with voluntary charity. At a conference held at Merthyr Tydfil, non-conformist ministers from Monmouthshire, Glamorgan, and Brecknock agreed to accept Government aid, enabling the formation of the South Wales British Schools Association, with Jones as treasurer and Benjamin Hall, 1st Baron Llanover as president.

== Death ==
Jones died at Morgannwg House on Glamorgan Street, Brecon, next to the Ursuline convent, on 30 August 1880.
