= Cwmdare =

Coordinates: 51.716667°N 3.466667°W

Cwmdare: Welsh: Cwmdâr
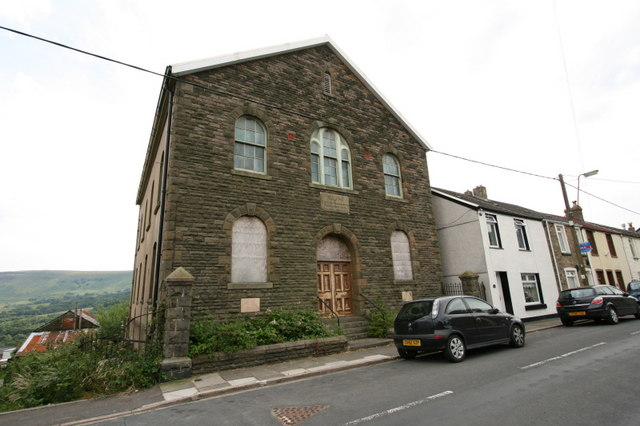
- Elim Chapel, Bwllfa Road, Cwmdare

- Location within Rhondda Cynon Taf
- Principal area: Rhondda Cynon Taf
- Preserved county: Mid Glamorgan
- Country: Wales
- Sovereign state: United Kingdom
- Post town: ABERDARE
- Police: South Wales
- Fire: South Wales
- Ambulance: Welsh
- UK Parliament: Merthyr Tydfil and Aberdare
- Senedd Cymru – Welsh Parliament: Cynon Valley

Cwmdare (Welsh: Cwmdâr) is a village very close to Aberdare, in Rhondda Cynon Taf, Wales. The village's history is intertwined with coal-mining, and since the decline of the industry in the 1980s, it has become primarily a commuter base for the larger surrounding towns of Aberdare and Merthyr Tydfil and Pontypridd, as well as the cities of Cardiff and Swansea.

== Name ==
The village's name translates to "Dare Valley". The Dare (Welsh: Dâr) is a tributary that flows down from the Darren mountain, down through the village and on to Aberdare (literally "Mouth Of The Dare"), where it joins the larger River Cynon, one of the largest tributaries of the River Taff.

== History ==
Before the rapid industrialisation of the early nineteenth century, Cwmdare was a small rural village in the parish of Aberdare. The parish was described as "very remarkable" for the Taplasau Hâf (summer games) which had taken place on feast days since at least the 1640s. Cwmdare was noted as one of three sites set aside for such games, this site was the Ton-glwyd-fawr located near the centre of the village. Today this area is known colloquially as 'The Ton' and a pub of the same name is situated near by.

By the mid-nineteenth century, the Industrial Revolution was fuelling the demand for Aberdare coal. Several deep coal mines appeared around Cwmdare, and families began to move into the area from other parts of Wales looking for work. The new miners needed housing, and between 1853 and 1859 the first streets were laid down on the west side of the Dare Valley, these would become the centre of the modern village. A few houses were also built on the east side of the valley, near the Merthyr Dare Colliery, known as Pithead. As the colliery activity increased so did the need for housing, and rows of terraced miners' cottages were built to the north-west. Cwmdare had four large collieries: the Cwmdare, Merthyr Dare and Bwllfa Dare collieries were all sunk in the 1850s, while work began on Nantmelyn Colliery in 1860. Over the next 120 years, the seams in the Maerdy mountain were gradually used up, with Merthyr Dare closing in 1884, Cwmdare in 1936, Nantmelin in 1957, and finally Bwllfa Dare in 1977.

== Post-mining ==
Since the mines closed, Cwmdare has become a residential satellite of nearby Aberdare, as well as Merthyr Tydfil, Cardiff and Swansea. There are almost no jobs in Cwmdare itself, so most residents commute to one of the larger towns for work.

Due to the redevelopment of the Dare Valley area in the 1970s, Cwmdare has become an attractive commuter village: it is near both of Wales' major urban centres, Cardiff and Swansea, and has good transport links, and attractive scenery. As a result, the population has increased rapidly, with much new-build housing, covering most of the east side of the Dare Valley, almost down to the river Dare itself.

== Local amenities ==
Despite its increased population, Cwmdare has few local amenities, and most residents rely on nearby Aberdare for most things. It does however have a local shop, a post office, and a pub, The Ton Glwyd Fawr Inn on the village square. In addition, as a reflection of the strong history of Nonconformism in South Wales mining areas, it has several chapels: Nebo, Elim, Gobaith and the Cwmdare Mission, as well as the Church In Wales St Luke's Church.

Cwmdare also has a variety of local schools, the oldest of which is Cwmdare Primary School, a respected English-medium primary school that teaches around 260 pupils from the ages of 4-11. In addition to this is Maesgwyn School, a school for pupils aged 11–19 with moderate learning difficulties, and Ysgol Gynradd Gymraeg Aberdâr – a Welsh-medium primary school that serves the upper Cynon Valley.

== Dare Valley Country Park ==
In 1970, when just one coal mine remained open, it was decided that the landscape on the west side of the valley, which had been destroyed by the mining industry for more than a century, should be returned to its original state. Over the next two years coal and slag tips were cleared, the River Dare was diverted, and the small mining hamlet of Pithead was demolished and two artificial lakes were created.

In 1973, the work was completed, and Dare Valley Country Park was opened to the public. It comprises 500 acres (2.0 km^{2}) of woodlands, pasture and moorland mountainside. Paths and bridges make the area popular with walkers, families and dog-walkers, while those with an interest in industrial history can still find evidence of the area's mining past dotted about the landscape, including an old pit wheel, erected as a monument at the site of the Bwllfa Dare pit. In 1985 a visitors' centre and camp site were built near the site of the old Merthyr Dare colliery. It features a café and 15 visitor rooms, as well as an exhibition that tells the story of Cwmdare's industrial and natural heritage.

== See also ==
- Aberdare
- Cynon Valley
- Dare Valley Country Park
- Aberdare High School
- PD Ports
- Mordecai Jones
- Iorwerth Thomas
