= Merthyr Road railway station =

Short-lived railway station in Hirwaun, Rhondda Cynon Taf

Merthyr Road

General information
- Location: Hirwaun, Glamorganshire; Wales
- Coordinates: 51.739°N 3.4898°W
- Grid reference: SN972055

Other information
- Status: Disused

History
- Original company: Vale of Neath Railway
- Pre-grouping: Vale of Neath Railway

Key dates
- 24 September 1851: Opened
- 2 November 1853: Closed
Location

Merthyr Road railway station served the village of Hirwaun, in the historical county of Glamorganshire, Wales, from 1851 to 1853 on the Vale of Neath Railway.

== History ==
The station was opened on 24 September 1851 by the Vale of Neath Railway. It was a temporary station, being replaced by Merthyr Tydfil on 2 November 1853.

Preceding station	Disused railways	Following station
Trecynon Halt; Line open, station closed	Vale of Neath Railway	Hirwaun; Line open, station closed
