= Baldwins Halt railway station =

Short-lived railway station in Crymlyn Burrows, Neath Port Talbot

Baldwins Halt

General information
- Location: Crymlyn Burrows, Glamorganshire; Wales
- Coordinates: 51.624°N 3.8784°W
- Grid reference: SS700933

Other information
- Status: Disused

History
- Original company: Great Western Railway

Key dates
- 1910: open for workmen
- 24 November 1924: Opened for public
- 11 September 1933: Closed
Location

Baldwins Halt railway station served the area of Crymlyn Burrows, in the historical county of Glamorganshire, Wales, from 1924 to 1933 on the Rhondda and Swansea Bay Railway.

== History ==
The station opened for workmen from 3 October 1910 and was known as Crymlyn Burrows. It appeared in the timetable from 10 July 1911 to 30 September 1911. It also appeared in Bradshaw in December 1922. Its life as a public station was short-lived from being opened to the public on 24 November 1924 and closing on 11 September 1933.

Preceding station	Disused railways	Following station
Jersey Marine; Line and station closed	Great Western Railway; Rhondda and Swansea Bay Railway	Danygraig Halt; Line and station closed
