= Jersey Marine railway station =

Former railway station in Wales

Coordinates: 51.6272°N 3.8585°W

Jersey Marine

General information
- Location: Jersey Marine, Neath Port Talbot; Wales
- Grid reference: SS714936
- Platforms: 1

Other information
- Status: Disused

History
- Original company: Rhondda and Swansea Bay Railway
- Pre-grouping: Rhondda and Swansea Bay Railway
- Post-grouping: Great Western Railway

Key dates
- 14 March 1895: Station opens
- 11 September 1933: Station closes
Location

Jersey Marine railway station was a railway station on the Rhondda and Swansea Bay line (R&SBR) which ran from the Rhondda Valley to Swansea on the Welsh coast in the county of Glamorgan. It lay 3 miles (4.8 km) east of Swansea.

== History ==
Jersey Marine opened in 1895 and closed in 1935 or 1933. Briton Ferry Road station lay close by on the Great Western Railway Vale of Neath line. The R&SBR was absorbed by the Great Western Railway in the Grouping of the railways in 1923 as a result of the Railways Act 1921.

A four-storey octagonal tower stands near the hotel and the station site, built in the Victorian era and designed as a camera obscura at the Jersey Marine holiday resort. Workmen's halts were located to the east at Cape Platform and at Baldwin's Halt to the west.

=== Infrastructure ===
Jersey Marine station had a single platform on the Jersey Marine Hotel side of the line with a single shelter and ticket office. A footpath led from the vicinity of the hotel and its grounds to the platform. A signalbox stood to the west and by 1914 a siding ran parallel to the single track main line. Jersey Marine South Junction was located nearby. A Jersey Marine North Junction was also present. The station site has been obliterated by a road overbridge however the line remains open.

Preceding station	Disused railways	Following station
Cape Platform	Great Western Railway; Rhondda and Swansea Bay Railway	Baldwin's Halt
