= Neath Abbey railway station =

Disused railway station in Neath, Neath Port Talbot

Neath Abbey
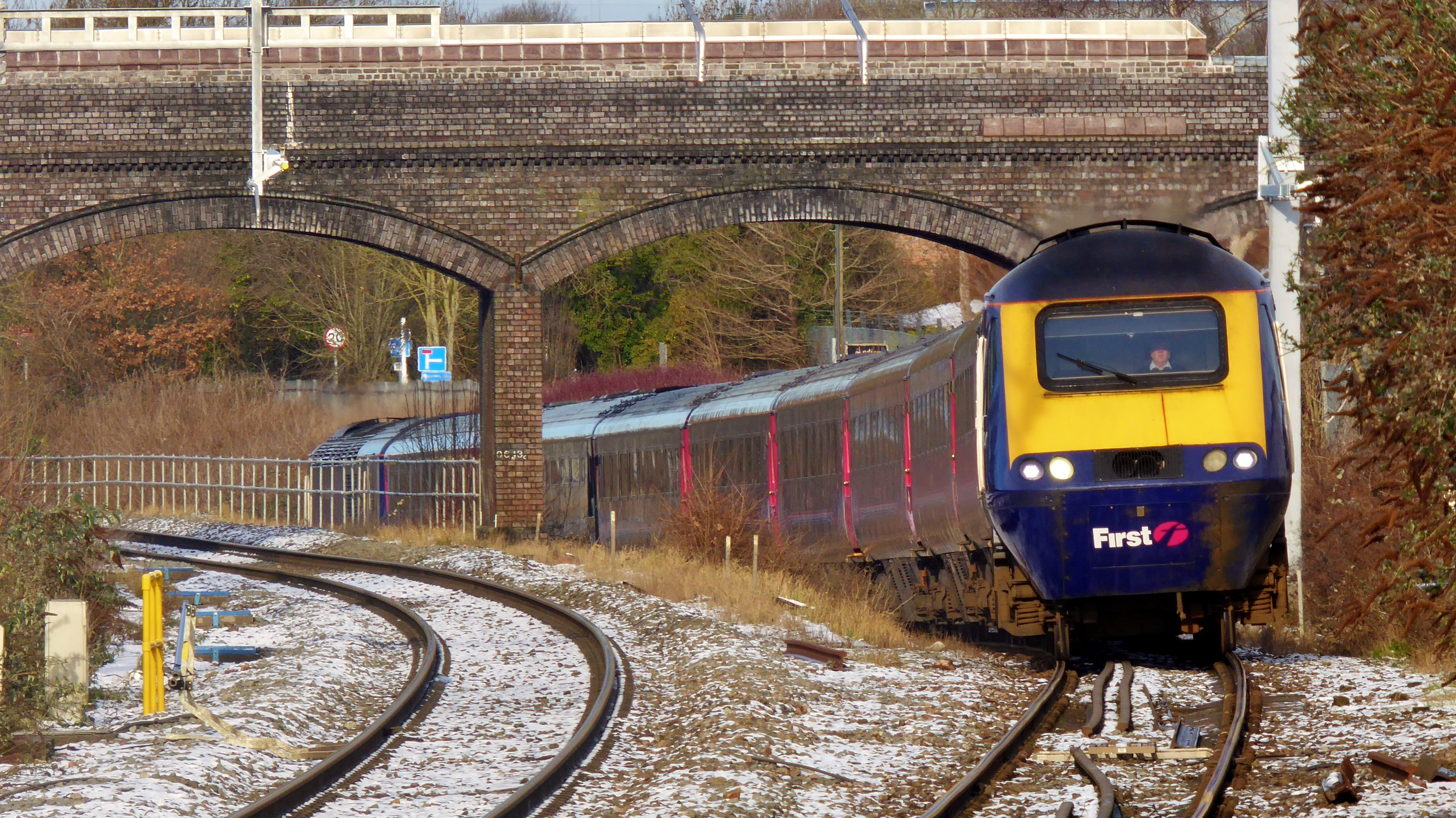

General information
- Location: Neath, Glamorganshire; Wales
- Coordinates: 51.6611°N 3.8309°W
- Grid reference: SS734973

Other information
- Status: Disused

History
- Original company: Vale of Neath Railway
- Pre-grouping: Great Western Railway
- Post-grouping: Great Western Railway

Key dates
- 1 August 1863: Opened
- 1 March 1873: Closed
- 1 October 1880: Reopened
- 28 September 1936: Closed
Location

Neath Abbey railway station served the town of Neath, in the historical county of Glamorganshire, Wales, from 1863 to 1936 on the Vale of Neath Railway.

== History ==
The station was opened on 1 August 1863 by the Great Western Railway. It closed on 1 March 1873 but reopened on 1 October 1880, before closing permanently on 28 September 1936.

Preceding station	Historical railways	Following station
Neath Riverside; Line open, station closed	Vale of Neath Railway	Cardonnel Halt; Line open, station closed
