= Aberdylais Halt railway station =

Disused railway station in Aberdulais, Neath

Coordinates: 51.67781°N 3.77758°W

Aberdylais

General information
- Location: Aberdulais, Neath Port Talbot; Wales
- Platforms: 2

Other information
- Status: Disused

History
- Original company: Vale of Neath Railway
- Pre-grouping: Great Western Railway
- Post-grouping: Great Western Railway

Key dates
- 24 September 1851: Station opened
- 7 June 1954: Station renamed "Aberdylais Halt"
- 15 June 1964: Station closed
Location

Aberdylais halt railway station served the village of Aberdulais in Wales. It was located on the line from Neath to Merthyr Tydfil.

== History ==
Opened by the Vale of Neath Railway, it became part of the Great Western Railway. The line then passed on to the Western Region of British Railways on nationalisation in 1948. Renamed by the British Transport Commission, it was then closed by the British Railways Board.

== The site today ==
Station Road marks the site of the former railway station, now home to the local branch of the Royal British Legion.

Preceding station	Disused railways	Following station
Neath	Vale of Neath Railway	Clyne Halt
