= Vale of Neath Railway 4-4-0ST locomotives =

The nine Vale of Neath Railway 4-4-0ST locomotives were broad gauge 4-4-0ST steam locomotives. The first entered service in 1851 and the last was withdrawn in 1872. The Vale of Neath Railway was amalgamated into the Great Western Railway on 1 February 1865, but the locomotives retained their old numbers.

== 5 ft 6 in locomotives ==
Vale of Neath 4-4-0ST
Type and origin
- Power type: Steam
- Designer: Daniel Gooch
- Builder: Robert Stephenson and Company
Specifications
- Configuration
  - Whyte: 4-4-0ST
  - UIC: 2′B nt
- Gauge: 7 ft (2,134 mm)
- Leading dia.: 3 ft 6 in (1,067 mm)
- Driver dia.: 5 ft 6 in (1,676 mm)
- Wheelbase: 17 ft 11 in (5.46 m)
- Cylinder size: 17 in × 24 in (432 mm × 610 mm)

- 1 (1851 – 1872)
- 2 (1851 – 1872)
- 3 (1851 – 1872)
- 4 (1851 – 1872)
- 5 (1851 – 1872)
- 6 (1851 – 1872)

The only locomotives on the Vale of Neath Railway in 1851 were these six bogie tank locomotives. Built by Robert Stephenson and Company, they were smaller-wheeled versions of Daniel Gooch's South Devon Railway Comet class locomotives that were built at the same time by various companies. They were all withdrawn shortly after the Welsh gauge conversion in 1872.

== 5 ft 0 in locomotives ==
Vale of Neath 4-4-0ST
Type and origin
- Power type: Steam
- Designer: Daniel Gooch
- Builder: Robert Stephenson and Company
Specifications
- Configuration
  - Whyte: 4-4-0ST
  - UIC: 2′B nt
- Gauge: 7 ft (2,134 mm)
- Leading dia.: 3 ft 6 in (1,067 mm)
- Driver dia.: 5 ft 0 in (1,524 mm)
- Wheelbase: 17 ft 11 in (5.46 m) (?)
- Cylinder size: 17.5 in × 24 in (444 mm × 610 mm)

- 7 (1854 – c.1858)
- 8 (1854 – c.1858)
- 9 (1854 – c.1858)

Three additional bogie tanks were added to the fleet in 1854. With smaller wheels and larger cylinders they were more powerful than the earlier locomotives, but in about 1858 they were converted to 0-6-0STs.
