= Vale of Neath Railway 0-6-0ST locomotives =

Vale of Neath Railway 0-6-0ST locomotives were 0-6-0ST steam locomotives for working the heavy goods traffic on the Vale of Neath Railway and its associated lines in Wales. The first of 13 broad gauge locomotives entered service in 1854 and the last was withdrawn in 1886. The remaining four were standard gauge locomotives.

The Vale of Neath Railway was amalgamated into the Great Western Railway on 1 February 1865. The broad gauge locomotives retained their old numbers, but the standard gauge ones were renumbered.

== Broad gauge ==
=== Rebuilt 4-4-0STs ===
Vale of Neath 0-6-0ST
Type and origin
- Power type: Steam
- Designer: Daniel Gooch
- Builder: Robert Stephenson & Co.
Specifications
- Configuration
  - Whyte: 0-6-0ST
- Gauge: 7 ft (2,134 mm)
- Cylinder size: 17.5 in × 24 in (444 mm × 610 mm)

- 7 (c.1858 – 1874)
- 8 (c.1858 – 1880)
- 9 (c.1858 – 1878)

Three small-wheeled 4-4-0ST locomotives had been built by Robert Stephenson and Company in 1854, but by 1858 they had all been rebuilt as 0-6-0STs and, as such, the last was withdrawn in 1880.

=== Small Vulcan locomotives ===
Vale of Neath 0-6-0ST
Type and origin
- Power type: Steam
- Designer: Daniel Gooch
- Builder: Vulcan Foundry
- Serial number: 362–364
Specifications
- Configuration
  - Whyte: 0-6-0ST
- Gauge: 7 ft (2,134 mm)
- Driver dia.: 4 ft 9 in (1,448 mm)
- Wheelbase: 15 ft 7 in (4.75 m)
- Cylinder size: 17 in × 24 in (432 mm × 610 mm)

- 10 (1854 – 1880)
- 11 (1854 – 1878)
- 12 (1854 – 1884)

The first 0-6-0STs delivered to the Vale of Neath Railway came from the Vulcan Foundry in 1854. Built to the same design as the South Devon Railway Tornado class with 900-imperial-gallon (4,100 L; 1,100 US gal) water tanks. The last one was withdrawn in 1884.

=== Large Vulcan locomotives ===
Vale of Neath 0-6-0ST
Type and origin
- Power type: Steam
- Builder: Vulcan Foundry
- Serial number: 409–411
Specifications
- Configuration
  - Whyte: 0-6-0ST
- Gauge: 7 ft (2,134 mm)
- Driver dia.: 4 ft 9 in (1,448 mm)
- Wheelbase: 15 ft 3 in (4.65 m)
- Cylinder size: 18 in × 24 in (457 mm × 610 mm)

- 13 (1856 – 1875)
- 14 (1856 – 1872)
- 15 (1857 – 1874)

A second batch of 0-6-0STs with longer 1,500-imperial-gallon (6,800 L; 1,800 US gal) tanks were delivered in 1856. They also had a shorter wheelbase, larger cylinders and different valve gear. They were altered to 0-6-0 tender locomotives after 1860 and were all withdrawn by 1875.

=== Slaughter, Grüning locomotives ===
Vale of Neath 0-6-0ST
Type and origin
- Power type: Steam
- Designer: Daniel Gooch
- Builder: Slaughter, Grüning & Co.
Specifications
- Configuration
  - Whyte: 0-6-0ST
- Gauge: 7 ft (2,134 mm)
- Driver dia.: 4 ft 6 in (1,372 mm)
- Wheelbase: 15 ft 7 in (4.75 m)
- Cylinder size: 17.5 in × 24 in (444 mm × 610 mm)

- 16 (1861 – 1886)
- 17 (1861 – 1885)
- 18 (1861 – 1872)
- 19 (1861 – 1875)

Four more broad gauge 0-6-0STs were delivered in 1861, this time from the Bristol builders, Slaughter, Grüning and Company, similar to the South Devon Railway Dido class that they had built the previous year. The last one was withdrawn in 1886.

In 1865 No. 16 was hauling a train of coal wagons at Swansea when it fell into the harbour, a moving bridge having been left open. The two men on the locomotive were killed.

== Standard gauge ==
Four standard gauge 0-6-0T locomotives were built by two different manufacturers, two by Robert Stephenson and Company, and two by the Vulcan Foundry.

- 20 (GWR No. 413)
- 21 (GWR No. 414)
- 22 (GWR No. 415)
- 23 (GWR No. 416)
