= Resolven railway station =

Disused railway station in Resolven, Neath Port Talbot

Resolven
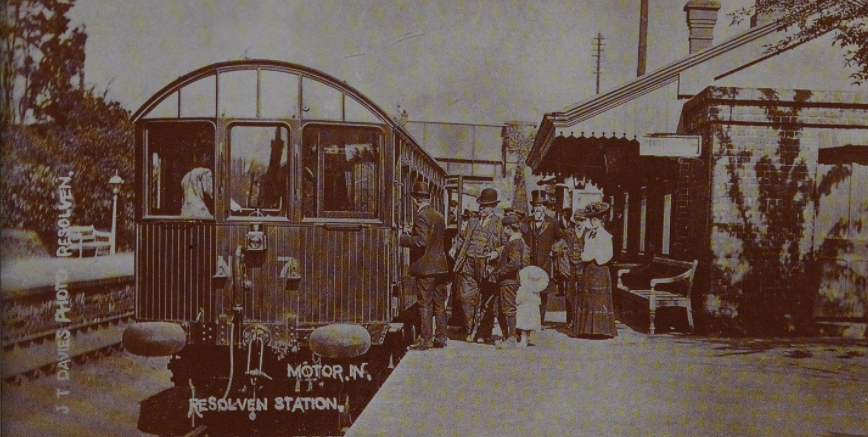
- Resolven station circa summer 1905, with passengers boarding one of the then-new GWR steam railcars

General information
- Location: Resolven, Neath Port Talbot; Wales
- Coordinates: 51.7108°N 3.6944°W
- Grid reference: SN830026
- Platforms: 2

Other information
- Status: Disused

History
- Original company: Vale of Neath Railway
- Pre-grouping: Great Western Railway
- Post-grouping: Great Western Railway

Key dates
- 24 September 1851: Opened
- 15 June 1964: Closed
Location

Resolven railway station served the village of Resolven, Neath Port Talbot, Wales, from 1851 to 1964 on the Vale of Neath Railway.

== History ==
Construction of the Vale of Neath line, including the station at Resolven, was announced in 1845. The station was opened on 24 September 1851 by the Vale of Neath Railway. The station served as a polling station in the 1885 general election. In 1905 a GWR guard was killed when he fell between the platform and a moving goods train at the station. The death was ruled to be accidental by the local coroner. It closed on 15 June 1964.

| Preceding station | Disused railways | Following station |
|---|---|---|
| Glyn Neath; Line and station closed | Vale of Neath Railway | Melyncourt Halt; Line and station closed |
