= Danygraig Halt railway station =

Disused railway station in Dan-y-graig, Swansea

Danygraig Halt

General information
- Location: Dan-y-graig, Glamorganshire; Wales
- Coordinates: 51.6197°N 3.9163°W
- Grid reference: SS674929

Other information
- Status: Disused

History
- Original company: Rhondda and Swansea Bay Railway
- Pre-grouping: Rhondda and Swansea Bay Railway
- Post-grouping: Great Western Railway

Key dates
- 14 March 1895: Opened as Danygraig
- 7 May 1899: Resited
- 11 September 1933: Resited and opened as Danygraig Halt
- 28 September 1936: Closed
Location

Danygraig Halt railway station served the suburb of Dan-y-graig, in the historical county of Glamorganshire, Wales, from 1895 to 1936 on the Rhondda and Swansea Bay Railway.

== History ==
The station was opened on 14 May 1895 by the Rhondda and Swansea Bay Railway. It was resited to the east on 7 May 1899 when the line was extended to Swansea. It was resited again onto the GWR line on 11 September 1933 and its name was changed to Danygraig Halt. It closed on 28 September 1936.

| Preceding station | Disused railways | Following station |
|---|---|---|
| Baldwins Halt; Line and station closed | Rhondda and Swansea Bay Railway | Swansea East Dock; Line and station closed |
