= Llwydcoed railway station =

Disused railway station in Llwydcoed, Rhondda Cynon Taf

Llwydcoed

General information
- Location: Llwydcoed, Glamorganshire; Wales
- Coordinates: 51.7348°N 3.4635°W
- Grid reference: SN990049
- Platforms: 1

Other information
- Status: Disused

History
- Original company: Vale of Neath Railway
- Pre-grouping: Great Western Railway
- Post-grouping: Great Western Railway

Key dates
- 2 November 1853: Opened
- 31 December 1962: Closed
Location

Llwydcoed railway station served the village of Llwydcoed, in the historical county of Glamorganshire, Wales, from 1853 to 1962 on the Vale of Neath Railway.

== History ==
The station was opened on 2 November 1853 by the Great Western Railway. It was erroneously known as Llwydcoed in the 1862 edition of the handbook of stations and Llurydcoed in 1867. It was corrected in 1872. The station closed on 31 December 1962.

Preceding station	Disused railways	Following station
Aberdare High Level; Line and station closed	Vale of Neath Railway	Merthyr Road; Line open, station closed
