= Tower Colliery =

Historic Welsh coal mine active until 2008

Coordinates: 51.727°N 3.555°W

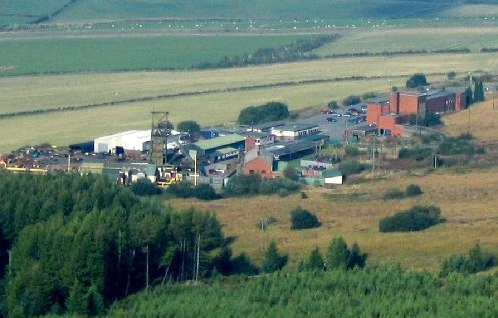
Tower Colliery

Tower Colliery (Welsh: Glofa'r Tŵr) was the oldest continuously working deep-coal mine in the United Kingdom, and possibly the world, until its closure in 2008. It was the last mine of its kind to remain in the South Wales Valleys. It was located near the villages of Hirwaun and Rhigos, north of the town of Aberdare in the Cynon Valley of South Wales.

== History ==
With coal located so close to the surface, it was known by locals to be possible to drift mine coal from Hirwaun common. This activity increased from 1805, until in 1864 the first drift named Tower was started, named after the nearby Crawshay's Tower, a folly built in 1848 and named after Richard Crawshay.

In 1941, a new shaft was sunk to a depth of 160 metres. From 1943 until closure, this shaft was used as the main "return" ventilation shaft and for the transport of men. In 1958 Tower No. 3 was driven to meet the No. 4 colliery workings, and was used as the main "intake" airway, conveying coal to the surface and transporting materials into the mine working areas.

The Aberdare branch of the Merthyr line continued north from Aberdare railway station to the colliery. While passenger services terminated in Aberdare, freight services operated several times a day along this stretch of line, directly owned by the colliery.

=== British Coal closure ===
Following the 1984–1985 UK miners' strike, the Conservative government authorised British Coal to close the majority of the UK's deep mines on economic grounds, nominally including Tower. But from 30 June 1986, with new underground roads having been driven, all coal from Mardy Colliery was also raised at Tower, the two mines effectively working as one coalfield system. Mardy closed as an access shaft on 21 December 1990.

In October 1993 the red flag was raised on Hirwaun common as a symbol of unity between workers of Tower Colliery during a march to commemorate the Merthyr Rising in 1831, and highlight the plight of their own pit. In 1994, the constituency MP, Ann Clwyd staged a sit-in in the mine to protest against its closure, accompanied by the late Glyndwr 'Glyn' Roberts (Senior) of Penywaun.

British Coal closed Tower Colliery on 22 April 1994, on the grounds that it would be uneconomic in current market conditions to continue production.

== Colliery buy-out by workers ==
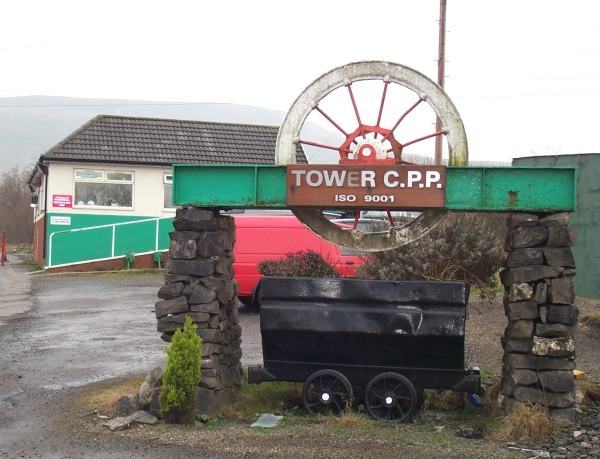
Coal Dram stands outside the Tower Colliery's sales office

Led by local NUM Branch Secretary Tyrone O'Sullivan, 239 miners joined TEBO (Tower Employees Buy-Out), with each pledging £8,000 from their redundancy payouts to buy back Tower. Against stiff central government resistance to the possibility of reopening the mine as a coal production unit, a price of £2 million was eventually agreed.

With their bid accepted, the miners marched back to the pit on 2 January 1995, with a balloon inflated for each worker. On 3 January 1995 the Colliery re-opened under the ownership of the workforce buy out company Goitre Tower Anthracite. Philip Weekes, the renowned Welsh mining engineer, was a key advisor to the buy-out team and became (unpaid) Chairman.

In 2014, John Redwood, the Secretary of State for Wales in 1995, and also Director of Margaret Thatcher's Number 10 Policy Unit 1983–1985, wrote of the period of pit closures and Tower Colliery:

At the end of the dispute I tried to get the government to offer the miners the right to work a pit the Coal Board claimed was uneconomic for themselves, as I was suspicious about some of the pits the Coal Board wished to close. I wanted a magnanimous aftermath. John Moore the privatisation Minister worked up some proposals but they got into the press before they were fully thought through or cleared with the PM, so the whole idea was lost. It was not until I was in the Cabinet myself that I was able to help one group of miners do just that, at Tower Colliery. They demonstrated that free of Coal Board control it was possible, at least in their case, to run the pit for longer.

=== Operations ===
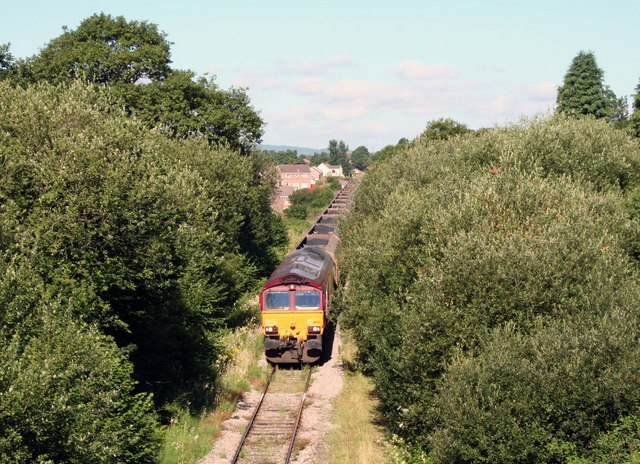
EWS Class 66 moves coal from the Tower towards Aberdare, 2006

Up to 14 coal seams had been worked at Tower Colliery during its history, and the neighbouring mines within the lease area of Tower, which was 14.8 km in circumference to create an area of 221.3 hectares. The actual boundaries of the lease were defined either by faults or seam splits in the local geostructure, or excess water to the northwest in the Bute seam. The seams produced good quality coking coal, which was washed onsite at a coal washing plant built in the mid-1980s, after extraction through the hillside on a conveyor belt.

Although the mine remained financially viable and continued to provide employment to the workers, by the time of the buyout the only seam worked at Tower was the Seven Feet/Five Feet, a combined seam of several leaves which offered 1.3m of anthracite in a mined section of 1.65m. Working directly under the shaft of the former Glyncorrwg Colliery's "nine feet" workings, the four faces worked in the western section of the lease were considered uneconomic by British Coal.

As the worked seam reduced in capacity, the management team considered three possibilities to extend the length of mine production:

- Work another nine faces in the existing workings, in coal classed only as mineral potential
- Address the water problem in the Bute seam, to the northwest
- Open new developments in the Nine Feet seam, 100 m above the existing seam; the Four Feet seam, a further 30 m above

But none of these prospects seemed economic, so the board recommended that work be concentrated on coal to the north of the existing workings, which had been left to protect the safety of the existing shafts. Accepted by the workforce and shareholders in an open vote, this decision effectively accepted the end of Tower as a deep mine.

=== Second closure ===
Having mined out the northern coal extracts, the colliery was last worked on 18 January 2008 and the official closure of the colliery occurred on 25 January. The colliery was, until its closure, one of the largest employers in the Cynon Valley.

Machinery from Tower was used to boost production at the nearby Aberpergwm Colliery, a smaller drift mine closed by the National Coal Board in 1985 but reopened by a private concern in the mid 1990s.

== Tower regeneration ==
The management announced at closure that one of the possibilities of creating additional short term value was through open cast mining extraction of the residual 6 million tonnes of anthracite. In August 2010, the company filed a planning application for the extraction by open cast mining of coal to a depth of 165 metres (541 ft), on a 200 acres (81 ha) section of the former coal washery site. Coal would then be transported to Aberthaw Power Station by train.

In 2012 Tower Regeneration Ltd, a joint venture partnership between Tower Colliery Ltd and Hargreaves Services plc was formed. The partnership company received planning permission that year to allow opencast coal extraction on what were termed the surface workings of the former colliery site, on the pre-condition that the site would be subject to land remediation and reclamation, followed by land restoration of the entire Tower Colliery site. The land reclamation works includes: removal of structures; removal of residual contamination; re-profiling of colliery spoil tips; removal of coal workings and mine entries; and provision of surface drainage. The project will create a sloping landform to reproduce semi-natural habitats on the site, and hence prepare the area ground for future mixed-use development.

== Future plan ==
The shareholders are still debating the future of the site, which they eventually wish to have developed to leave a legacy for the area which provides employment. Eventually there are plans to develop the site, with combinations of housing, industrial estate, industrial heritage museum or tourism resort being debated with several potential partners.
