= Swansea East Dock railway station =

Disused railway station in Swansea, Wales

Coordinates: 51.6213°N 3.9269°W

Swansea East Dock
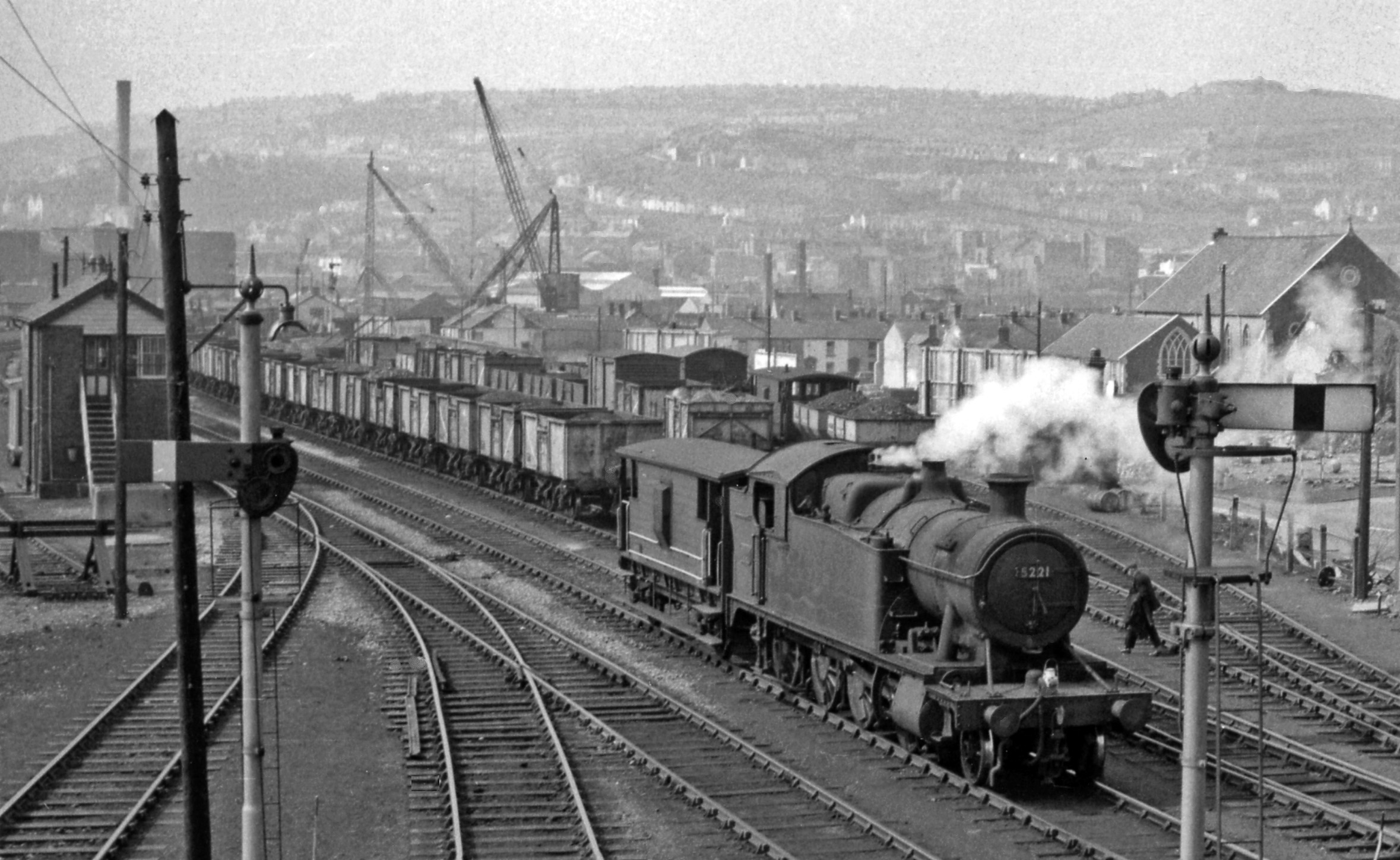
- The railway yard in 1962

General information
- Location: Swansea, Glamorganshire; Wales
- Platforms: 3

Other information
- Status: Disused

History
- Original company: Great Western Railway
- Post-grouping: Great Western Railway

Key dates
- 1 October 1880: Opened
- 28 September 1936: Closed
Location

Swansea East Dock railway station served the city of Swansea, in the historical county of Glamorganshire, Wales, from 1880 to 1936 on the Swansea and Neath Railway.

== History ==
The station was opened on 1 October 1880 by the Great Western Railway. It was known as Swansea East Dock Fabians Bay in the handbook of stations. The engine shed closed in 1964. The station closed on 28 September 1936.

Preceding station	Disused railways	Following station
Briton Ferry Road; Line and station closed	Great Western Railway; Swansea and Neath Railway	Terminus
