= Mardy Colliery =

Welsh coal mine active 1875-1990

Coordinates: 51°40′48.02″N 3°29′13.05″W

Maerdy Colliery
- Interactive map of Maerdy Colliery
- Location: Wales
- Products: Steam coal
- Opened: 1881
- Active: 1881–1990
- Closed: 1990
- Company: 1874–1880: Mordecai Jones / J. R. Cobb; 1880–1932: Locket's Merthyr Company; 1932–1935: Welsh Associated Collieries; 1935–1947: Powell Duffryn; 1947–1990: National Coal Board

Maerdy Colliery was a coal mine located in the South Wales village of Maerdy (Welsh: Y Maerdy), in the Rhondda Valley, located in the county borough of Rhondda Cynon Taf, and within the historic county boundaries of Glamorgan, Wales. Opened in 1875, it closed in December 1990.

== History ==
Maerdy derives its name from a large farmhouse on a bank of the Rhondda Fach, which became the local meeting place for both court matters and worship. Maerdy is the Welsh word for mayor's house.

While other areas of the South Wales coalfield had been exploited up to 50 years earlier, due to the scarcity and difficult access conditions of Rhondda Fach, it remained largely undeveloped. However, demand for steam coal drove development and, in 1874, Mordecai Jones of Brecon and Nantmelyn purchased the mineral rights around the farmhouse and its surrounding lands from the estate of the late Crawshay Bailey for £122,000. Additional capital was provided by a partner, J. R. Cobb, and a trial pit was sunk in 1875.

In 1876, this No. 1 Pit struck the Abergorky vein of coal. Proving the mine viable by increasing production to 100 tons per day, Maerdy No. 2 Pit was sunk in 1876. After connecting the mine to the Taff Vale Railway's Maerdy Branch, they transported the first coal to Cardiff Docks in 1877. After the death of Mordecai Jones in 1880, the mine was leased to Locket's Merthyr Company. They invested to increase production, which expanded from 30,000 tons p.a. in 1879 to over 160,000 tons p.a. by 1884, and sank Maerdy No. 3 Pit in 1893. The mine was now divided into two separate districts: the East, known as "Rhondda", and the West, known as "Aberdare". By this time the mine's link to the Taff Vale Railway had become the mainline to Porth and onwards to Cardiff. Maerdy No. 4 Pit was completed in 1914.

In 1932 Bwllfa and Cwmaman Collieries, part of the Welsh Associated Collieries, took control of Mardy. After WAC merged with the coal interests of Powell Duffryn in 1935 to form Powell Duffryn Associated Collieries Limited, the colliery was completely closed, with the loss of 1,000 jobs: 120 on the surface, 880 underground. Reopening in 1938, it was greatly affected by the suspension of coal exports to Europe at the start of World War II, and hence closed in 1940.

=== Nationalisation ===
Nationalised in 1947, the mine was redeveloped by the National Coal Board with a £7 million investment announced in 1949, creating capacity for No. 3 and No. 4 shafts to access 100 million tons of coal in the 5 ft seam, estimated sufficient to last for one hundred years. It was transformed into one of the most modern pits in the United Kingdom, with fully electric winding, new extended railway sidings and a coal washing plant on the surface, built on the site of the former No. 1 and No. 2 shafts, and new underground roads linking the mine to Bwllfa Colliery in the Cynon Valley. After the colliery band was disbanded, in 1978 the mine adopted the local Tylorstown silver band, which was renamed the "Tylorstown and Mardy Colliery Band."

=== Closure ===
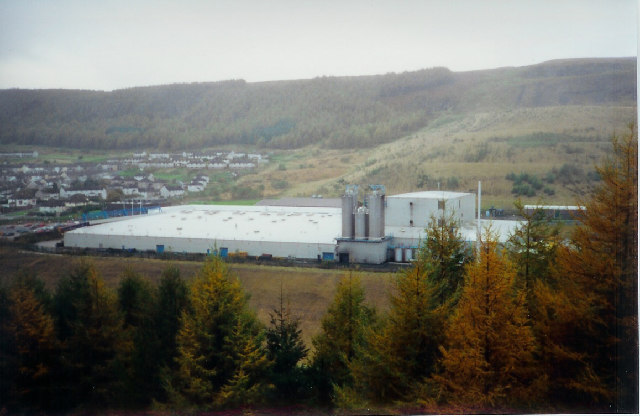
A factory on the former site of Mardy Colliery

The 1984/5 Miners Strike closed the mine for a year, and from 30 June 1986, with all coal being raised at Tower Colliery, the two mines were effectively working as one coalfield system. The last miners' shift descended to pit bottom on 21 December 1990, after which friends were allowed down to collect souvenir pieces of the 5 ft seam, and then return to sing carols in the surface canteen. The Tylorstown silver band then followed a procession, playing The Internationale, to Maerdy Welfare Hall, where a "wake" was held. Of the remaining 300 workers at the pit, only 17 chose to transfer to other collieries.

In March 1996, the site was cleared to make way for an industrial unit, for Fenner to use as a polymer factory. It is now owned by Avon Group, who make rubber parts for aerosol cans, and gaskets and seals for vehicles.

== 1885 explosion ==
By 1885, the colliery was employing 961 men, 200 on the night shift and 761 on the day shift. At approximately 2.40 p.m. on Wednesday 23 December 1885, with 750 men below ground, a loud report was heard above ground, and a column of smoke and dust then bellowed from the upcast shaft.

A rescue team led by William Thomas, a director of Lockett's Merthyr Steam Coal Company, immediately descended. Finding the workers in the West district had survived, they also joined the rescue effort. The team found a group of 30 men and boys on the East district, who having been working 120 yards (110 m) below the explosion, had survived. However, bodies were readily found, and with due care for the safety of the rescuers, it took until the following Sunday to complete the recovery of all 81 bodies: 63 from suffocation; 18 from burns and violence. The funerals for the victims were held at Ferndale and Llanwonno cemeteries, on the following Saturday, Sunday and Monday.

After the Coroner's Inquest, held at the Maerdy Hotel on 12–18 January 1886, a barrister, A. G. C. Liddell, was appointed to submit a report to the Mines Inspector, and hence to the Minister and both houses of Parliament. In his report, Liddell stated that:

We find that an explosion of gas occurred in the Rhondda District of the Maerdy Colliery on the 23rd December 1882, whereby Daniel Williams lost his life, but how or where the gas ignited, sufficient evidence has not been produced to enable us to determine. We are, however, convinced that it did not occur from shot firing in the hard heading

Liddell's Report was highly critical of the safety procedures, which he concluded were not carried out to the specifications of the Coal Mines Regulation Act 1872, evidenced by: no barometer kept in a conspicuous position at the entrance to the mine; positioning of lamp stations, hence allowing naked flames to travel through the workings; removal and watering of the coal dust that built up in the mine, which Liddell observed was carried out in a "desultory way" and was not done in a "sufficiently systematic character."

Liddell concluded that the most likely cause of the explosion was poor observance of shot-firing regulations, it having been normal practise to ignore the blue-flame warning of the lamps. Secondly, only the miners within a 50 yards (46 m) distance were removed from the immediate workings, and not the entire district as the regulations required.

Liddell concluded that the course of the blast from the explosion was approximately one mile long, and emanated in an area called the Northwest dip. Stonemasons were working in the area to reduce the height of a rock fall so that it did not become a gas collection point, and had been using an open-flamed "comet" lamp. Liddell concludes that either the shot-firing dislodged gas above the arch on to the "comet," or that the lamp was raised too high and came into contact with coal damp.

Neither of the two theories examined by Liddell in his report can be scientifically proven and, further, the extent of the blast does not explain its ferocity. He therefore concludes that however the blast occurred, it was the accumulation of coal damp and coal dust throughout the working from poor watering procedure that created such an explosive situation to occur. "[H]owever the initial blast occurred, it was the profusion of coal dust in the workings that actually propagated the explosion." He therefore recommended two changes to the coal mining regulations:

- That a system of watering had to be put in place in all mines under a competent officer
- Prohibit shot firing in a mine without previous watering of all places to which the flame of the shot might extend

Following the submission of the report and a further inspection, the mine was reopened in January 1886.

== Industrial relations ==
From its opening, Mardy had a reputation as a place for militants and left-wing political extremists, particularly communists. A prominent communist, Arthur Horner, was elected in absentia as a checkweighman—at the time, he was serving a prison sentence for refusing to fight in the First World War. In the 1926 General Strike, its militancy led to the mineworkers' lodge being suspended from the South Wales Miners Federation, and expelled in 1930. During the period after the general strike, the South Wales Daily News first applied the term Little Moscow when describing Mardy. As a result, and with a slump in the demand for steam coal, production at Mardy did not resume until late 1927.

There is a red Soviet banner from female workers in Moscow in 1926, made for British miners and their wives, which originally was kept in Maerdy ('Little Moscow').

During the 1984/85 miners' strike, the pit remained true to its militant heritage and sent men as flying pickets all over the country; only two token picket lines were ever needed at Mardy itself, as no Mardy miner would ever cross a picket line. The wives formed the first women's support groups in the South Wales Coalfield, organising food collection and distribution, and joining their husbands on the picket lines. The miners returned to work on 5 March 1985, marching behind their union banners and the colliery band. A documentary following the miners and their families during the 1984 Miners strike was filmed by the BBC. A follow-up of the closure in 1990 was also produced.
