= Glyn Neath railway station =

Disused railway station in Glynneath, Neath Port Talbot

Glyn Neath
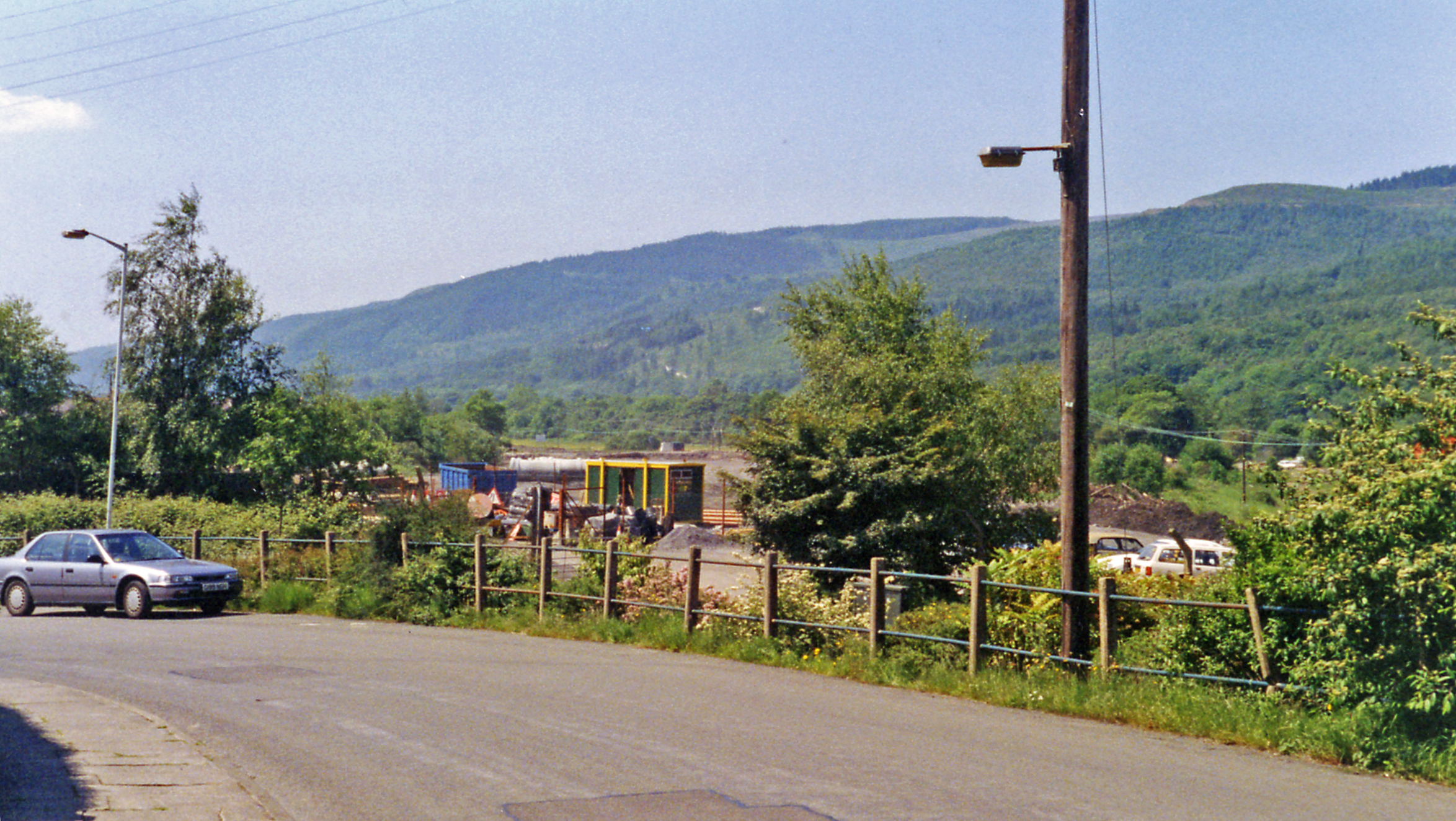
- The site of the station in 1994

General information
- Location: Glynneath, Glamorganshire; Wales
- Coordinates: 51.7373°N 3.6406°W
- Grid reference: SN868055
- Platforms: 2

Other information
- Status: Disused

History
- Original company: Vale of Neath Railway
- Pre-grouping: Great Western Railway
- Post-grouping: Great Western Railway

Key dates
- 24 September 1851: Opened
- 15 June 1964: Closed
Location

Glyn Neath railway station served the town of Glynneath, in the historical county of Glamorganshire, Wales, from 1851 to 1964 on the Vale of Neath Railway.

== History ==
The station was opened on 24 September 1851 by the Vale of Neath Railway. It closed on 15 June 1964.

| Preceding station | Disused railways | Following station |
|---|---|---|
| Cwmrhyd-y-Gau Halt; Line and station closed | Vale of Neath Railway | Resolven; Line and station closed |
