= Penywaun =

Penywaun: Welsh: Pen-y-waun
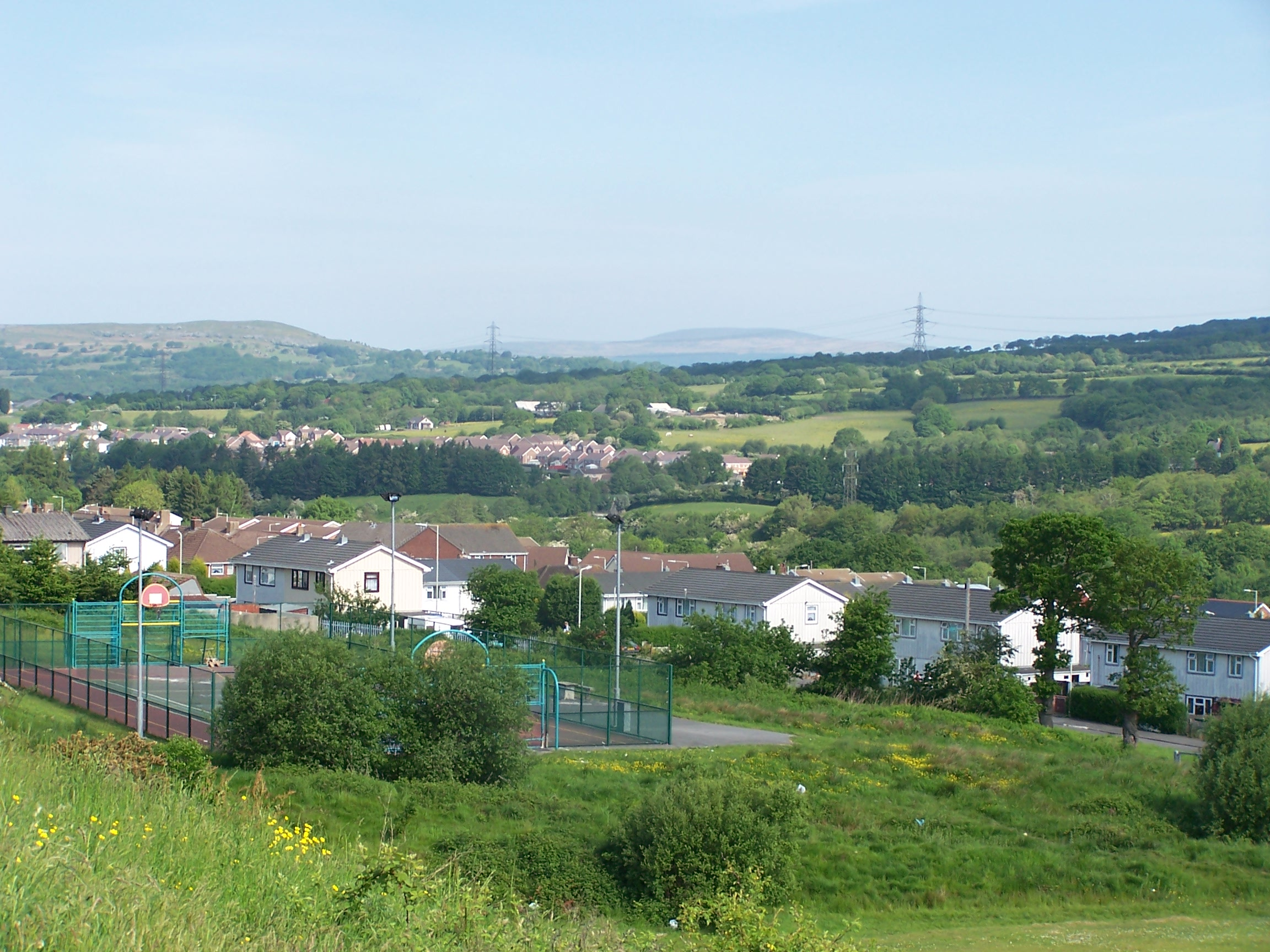
- OS grid reference: SN974045
- Principal area: Rhondda Cynon Taf
- Preserved county: Mid Glamorgan
- Country: Wales
- Sovereign state: United Kingdom
- Post town: Aberdare
- Postcode district: CF44
- Dialling code: 01685
- Police: South Wales
- Fire: South Wales
- Ambulance: Welsh
- UK Parliament: Merthyr Tydfil and Aberdare
- Senedd Cymru – Welsh Parliament: Cynon Valley
- List of places UK Wales Rhondda Cynon Taf 51.733333°N 3.483333°W Map of the community

Penywaun (also in Welsh: Pen-y-waun) is a community, electoral ward and north-western suburb of Aberdare in the Cynon Valley within the county borough of Rhondda Cynon Taf, Wales. At the 2011 census, the population of the ward was registered as 3,063.

== Etymology ==
The term "Penywaun" derives from two common Welsh toponyms "Pen" meaning top or head and "Gwaun" meaning moorland. Writing in 1887, Thomas Morgan states that the toponym (which he spells "Penwaun") indicates the end of the moor known as the Hirwaun Gwrgant or Gwrgan's "Waun".

== Background ==
Much of the local housing was built by the local Aberdare urban district council after the Second World War in several stages, starting with simple pre-fabricated houses.

Shops and businesses trading in the village include a cafe, newsagents, hairdresser, a traditional fish and chip shop, and three grocery-type stores, one opposite the Colliers Arms (now closed) pub . Most of the retail is in a retail precinct ('the Shopping Centre').

== Schools ==
- Primary Schools
  - Penywaun Primary School, near Coed Glas, educates approximately 252 pupils, aged 3 to 11.
- Main secondary education schools are:
  - Ysgol Gyfun Rhydywaun a Welsh Medium comprehensive school, serving the village since 1995.
  - Aberdare Community School
  - St. John's The Baptist High School Of Aberdare.

== Culture ==
St. Winifred Church, Penywaun

Saint Winifred Church - see photograph - (Church in Wales) is in the centre of the village. St Lleurwg Church in Hirwaun is the sister church sharing (co-serving) the Parish of Hirwaun.

Penywaun Workingmen's Club and Institute (PWCI) began in the village in 1959. Many successful singers and entertainers have performed here, including Sir Tom Jones shortly before his rise to stardom in the 1960s.

== Politics ==
Penywaun is also an electoral ward for Rhondda Cynon Taf County Borough Council. The County Borough Councillor until 2012 was Glyn Roberts (Labour), a long-serving Director of the Tower Colliery company.

== Sport, leisure and recreation ==
Penywaun F.C. plays soccer regularly in the Aberdare Valley Premier Division.

Penywaun is also home to an award-winning Tang Soo Do group which meet regularly at Penywaun Community Centre.

Two allotments (for gardening) are managed locally by Rhondda Cynon Taf Council.

Aberdare Park and Dare Valley Country Park are within two miles.

== Notable people ==
- Kim Howells - Welsh Labour politician and MP for Pontypridd, born in Merthyr Tydfil, but raised in Penywaun
- Dai Young (rugby footballer) - Lived in Penywaun for many years with his parents
