= Vale of Neath Railway =

Broad gauge railway company in Wales

Overview
- Headquarters: Aberdare
- Locale: Wales
- Dates of operation: 1851–1865
- Successor: Great Western Railway

Technical
- Track gauge: 7 ft (2,134 mm)
- Length: 44 miles (71 km)

The Vale of Neath Railway (VoNR) was a broad gauge railway company. It built a line from Merthyr Tydfil and Aberdare to Neath, in Wales, mostly to transport the products of the Merthyr iron industries to ports on Swansea Bay.

The railway focused on transporting coal from the rapidly developing rich colliery area around Aberdare. When the narrow (standard) gauge Newport, Abergavenny and Hereford Railway (NA&HR) made moves to link to the area, with its Taff Vale Extension line, the Vale of Neath Railway saw that there was potential in connecting up; it laid a third rail to make mixed gauge. The link was made in 1864, and coal was conveyed to London and the north-west of England by that route. By that time, the VoNR and the NA&HR had been absorbed into the Great Western Railway (GWR) system.

Connections to the docks at Swansea had not been fruitful in the early days, and the Swansea and Neath Railway, soon taken over by the VoNR, made some improvement, but the docks area remained congested and difficult.

The main line of the VoNR was always busy in GWR days, mineral traffic being intensive and difficult because of steep gradients and inadequate infrastructure. The decline of the coal industry after 1945 brought decline of the VoNR route as well, and in 1964 passenger operation ceased, followed by much of the mineral activity. The Merthyr station is in use today (by trains approaching on the former Taff Vale Railway route), rationalised and slightly relocated, and the Aberdare station was similarly treated when its passenger service was reinstated in 1988.

== History ==
=== Before the railway ===
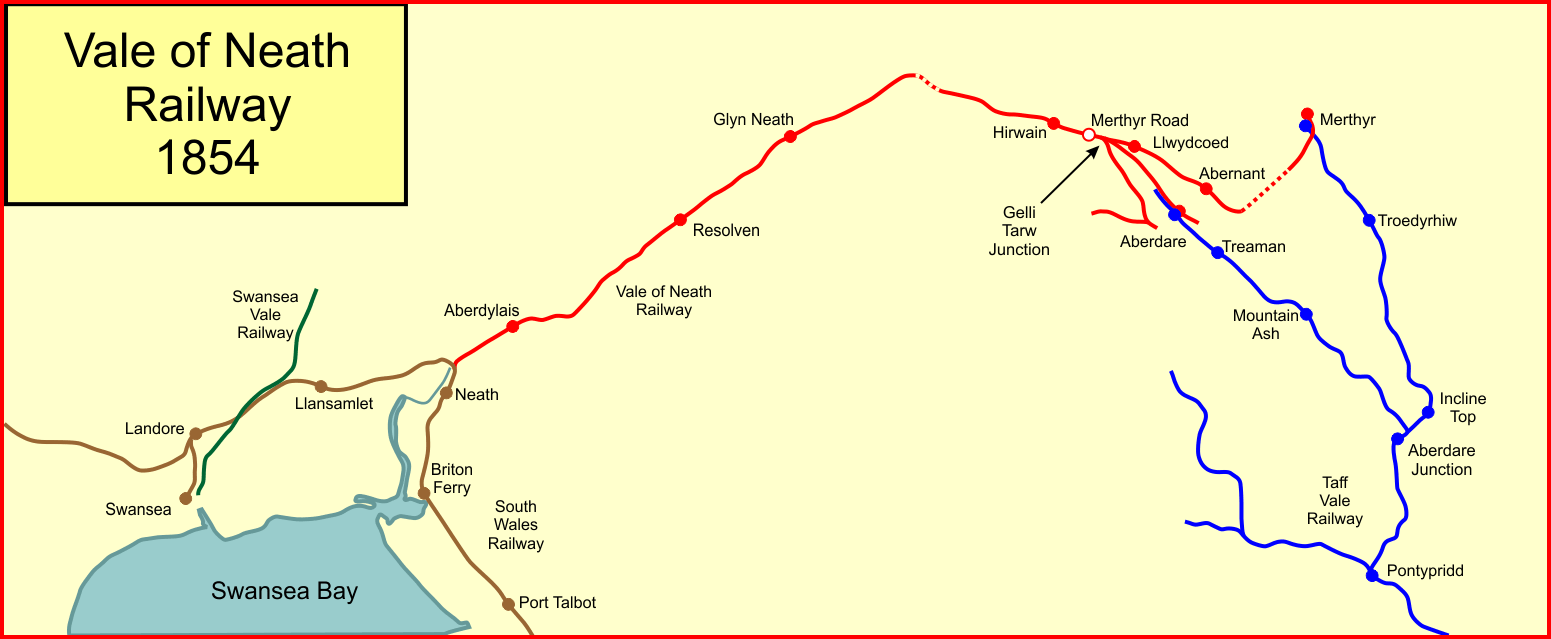
The Vale of Neath Railway network in 1854

The Vale of Neath is a river valley descending from Pontneddfechan and Glynneath to the town of Neath, close to Baglan Bay, itself part of Swansea Bay. By the 18th century, Merthyr Tydfil was the centre of a huge iron smelting industry; excellent coal was beginning to be mined at Aberdare, and these two industries became dominant in their respective localities. The town of Neath itself became a centre of engineering industry.

Until late in the 18th century, the difficulty was transporting the heavy products of the mineral industries to market, overseas and domestically. The roads were extremely poor, and the River Neath was unnavigable. Yet the demand for satisfactory transport was powerful, and eventually the Neath Canal was opened fully in 1795, running down from Glynneath to Neath itself. Even then, the canal did not immediately serve the originating point of mineral products, and some short tramways were built to make the connection. Indeed, coal from Aberdare was hauled uphill by horse power in the Cynon Valley to cross to Glynneath for the canal.

The Aberdare Canal was opened in 1812, leading instead down the valley to Abercynon, where it connected with the Glamorganshire Canal.

=== First railways ===
In the 1830s it had become clear that the way forward for heavy transport was railways of a modern pattern, with steam locomotives. Although the early technology was very primitive, progress was being made following the example of the Stockton and Darlington Railway, opened from 1825.

In South Wales, the Taff Vale Railway was authorised by an act of Parliament, the Taff Vale Railway Act 1836 (6 & 7 Will. 4. c. lxxxii). This was a purely local railway, connecting the iron-producing town of Merthyr Tydfil to Cardiff Docks; it was constructed on the standard gauge, and opened in stages from 1840. In 1845 the South Wales Railway was authorised, by the South Wales Railway Act 1845 (8 & 9 Vict. c. cxc), to build from near Gloucester to Milford Haven Waterway. This was to be a trunk line, in fact connecting with the Great Western Railway and the English railway network. Engineered by Isambard Kingdom Brunel, it was to be built on the broad gauge.

=== The Vale of Neath Railway promoted ===
The authorisation of the South Wales Railway brought fresh energy to the possibility of new railway lines in South Wales, but it was to skirt the southern margin of the valleys. Industrial locations in the valleys themselves would need their own railways to link to the South Wales Railway, or to harbours for onward conveyance of their production.

H. S. Coke was the town clerk of Neath, and a solicitor by profession. He was the driving force in promoting the idea of a railway following the River Neath, and connecting Merthyr with Neath; at Neath there would be the alternatives of onward railway transport on the South Wales Railway, or transfer to ships at the staithes on the river. On 21 May 1845 he put his ideas to the provisional directors of the South Wales Railway, although they had not yet secured their own authorising act of Parliament. They were supportive, provided that Coke's railway was also on the broad gauge system.

His intended route was from Neath up the relatively gentle valley as far as Glynneath; from there the line was to climb much more steeply and penetrate the mountain at the watershed, then descending the Cynon Valley to Cwmbach (near Aberdare) and turning northeast to pass through another mountain by a long tunnel to reach Merthyr. There would be a branch to Aberdare itself.

Vale of Neath Railway Act 1846
- Act of Parliament
- Parliament of the United Kingdom
- Long title: An Act for making a Railway from the South Wales Railway, at or near to the Town of Neath, to Merthyr Tidvil, with Branches, to be called "The Vale of Neath Railway."
- Citation: 9 & 10 Vict. c. cccxli
- Territorial extent: United Kingdom

Dates
- Royal assent: 3 August 1846

Other legislation
- Amends: Neath Canal Navigation Act 1798

Text of statute as originally enacted

The bill for the line went to the 1846 session of Parliament; Brunel as engineer gave evidence to the committees. He was questioned in detail about the gradients on the line, as the steep and lengthy gradients were not considered suitable for mineral lines. Brunel's persuasive evidence carried the matter through, and the Vale of Neath Railway was authorised by act of Parliament, the Vale of Neath Railway Act 1846 (9 & 10 Vict. c. cccxli), of 3 August 1846. Share capital was to be £550,000.

=== Construction ===
Vale of Neath Railway Amendment Act 1847
- Act of Parliament
- Parliament of the United Kingdom
- Long title: An Act for enabling the Vale of Neath Railway Company to construct certain new Lines of Railway in connexion with the Vale of Neath Railway; and for other Purposes.
- Citation: 10 & 11 Vict. c. lxxiv

Dates
- Royal assent: 2 July 1847

Text of statute as originally enacted

Vale of Neath Railway Amendment Act 1848
- Act of Parliament
- Parliament of the United Kingdom
- Long title: An Act for enabling the South Wales Railway Company to hold Shares in the Undertaking of the Vale of Neath Railway Company; and for other Purposes.
- Citation: 11 & 12 Vict. c. xxvii

Dates
- Royal assent: 30 June 1848

Text of statute as originally enacted

The company's act of Parliament merely authorised the £550,000 of share capital; securing commitment from subscribers proved more difficult, especially as the money market had suddenly become depressed, and by September it seemed apparent that about £127,000 of shares were going to be unissued. The South Wales Railway, by now under construction and seeing the value to them of a broad gauge connection to Merthyr, agreed to take the unallocated shares; the arrangement was ratified in an act of Parliament, the Vale of Neath Railway Amendment Act 1848 (11 & 12 Vict. c. xxvii).

By July 1847 the first construction contract was let, but the Merthyr Tunnel contract was held over for the time being. It was started the following year, but exceptional difficulties in the tunnelling led to two successive contractors failing, and the company decided to make Aberdare the interim objective, recognising now that Merthyr would not be reached for some time.

The authorising act of Parliament of the Vale of Neath Railway had specified that the Aberdare terminus was to be close to the Taff Vale Railway station (actually the station of the Aberdare Railway, sponsored by the Taff Vale). In the meantime it had become plain that a colliery at Gadlys was expanding considerably, but access to that required the VoNR line to cross the Aberdare Railway route on the level. Approaches to the Taff Vale interest met with a rebuff, and in the end the VoNR located its station across the River Cynon from the TVR/AR station. (The colliery itself built the connection in 1853, and it became an important interchange point between the VoNR and the TVR.)

The construction took much longer than expected, and this led to friction in board meetings in 1850, and this was followed by site difficulties during the following winter. Brunel now predicted a June 1851 opening, and it was time to order rolling stock. Six locomotives were ordered from Robert Stephenson, and 25 coaches and 72 wagons were ordered. The majority of the wagons for coal were flat wagons, on which coal was to be conveyed in bottom-opening iron boxes, a form of containerisation. A further earthslip took place in May 1851, frustrating the desire to open the line.

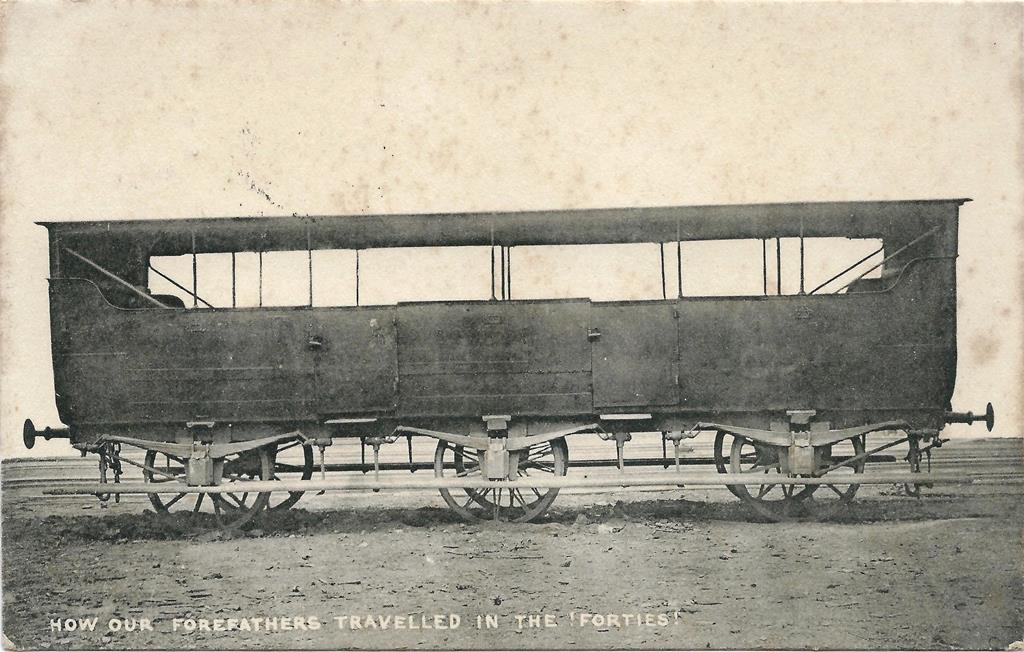
A third class coach built for the opening of the line (although the roof was added later)

Finally on 23 September 1851 a ceremonial opening train for directors and their friends ran from Neath to Aberdare. There were stations at Neath, jointly with the South Wales Railway, Aberdulais, Resolven, Glynneath, Hirwaun, Merthyr Road, and Aberdare. Merthyr Road was the station for reaching Merthyr by a road connection; it was located where the present-day A465 road crosses the route.

The ordinary public service started on 24 September 1851, with three trains each way daily, two on Sundays. The journey time was 70 minutes.

Passenger traffic was immediately buoyant, but at first wharves at Briton Ferry were not ready to receive coal trains; the company had been relying on these. Moreover, there was a problem with silting at Swansea, so it was not until April 1852 that coal traffic was started. Ordinary goods traffic had started in December 1851.

Construction of the tunnel to Merthyr had been resumed in February 1851, and on 2 November 1853 the Merthyr section was opened, and Merthyr Road station could be closed. Passengers for Aberdare were now required to change trains at Hirwaun to continue their journey.

The line from Neath to Gelli Tarw Junction (where the Aberdare and Merthyr lines separated) was double track. The Merthyr line was planned to be double track, and the southern end of the long tunnel to Merthyr was constructed accordingly, but that objective was given up and the majority of the tunnel was built to single track dimensions only.

There was a tunnel at Pencaedrain, near the summit above Glynneath; it was 526 yards (481 m) in length. Gradients were stiff; from Neath to the summit at Hirwaun was a steep climb, with 5 1/2 miles (9 km) of continuous slope between 1 in 51 and 1 in 47.

=== Early results and extensions ===
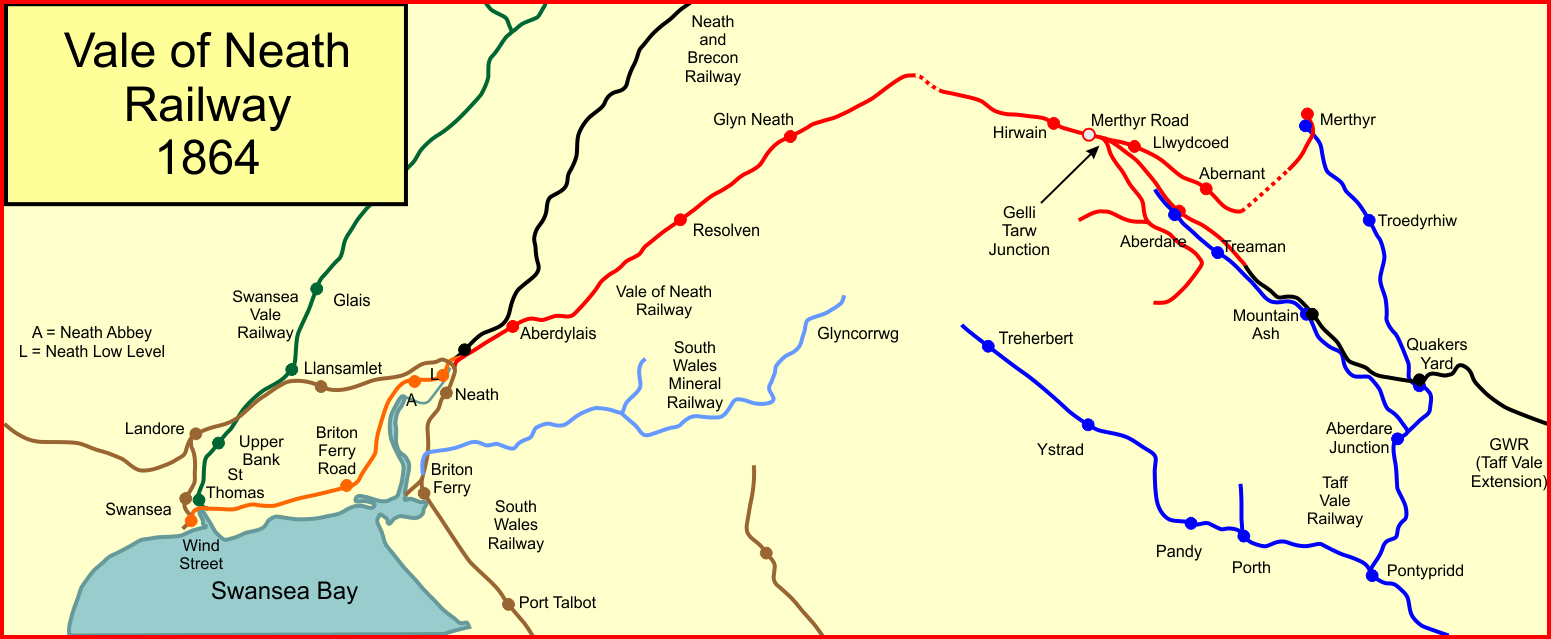
The Vale of Neath Railway network in 1864

The passenger business was gratifyingly busy, and colliery interest in mineral transport was also high. A 1.5% dividend was distributed at the end of 1852, and at the same time a decision was taken to extend the line at Aberdare to reach the head of the Aberdare Canal, which was half a mile (1 km) below the town. For the time being tramways were used to close the gap, and the coal containers were craned at the transfer points. The extension was brought into use in June 1853.

In addition short extensions at Aberdare to the Dare and Aman valleys were to be built. Plainly now the coal resources at Aberdare outweighed the iron production output at Merthyr, and the emphasis was on developing the former. Three more locomotives were ordered as well as a few carriages, but two second-class carriages were disposed of, for lack of use.

Aberdare Valley Railway Act 1855
- Act of Parliament
- Parliament of the United Kingdom
- Long title: An Act for making a Railway through Part of the Aberdare Valley in the County of Glamorgan, to join the Vale of Neath Railway.
- Citation: 18 & 19 Vict. c. cxx

Dates
- Royal assent: 2 July 1855

Text of statute as originally enacted

Vale of Neath Railway (Capital) Act 1855
- Act of Parliament
- Parliament of the United Kingdom
- Long title: An Act to empower the Vale of Neath Railway Company to raise further Money for the Purposes of their Undertaking.
- Citation: 18 & 19 Vict. c. xxv

Dates
- Royal assent: 25 May 1855

Text of statute as originally enacted

Profits and dividends continued to increase, and although the Dare and Aman valley extensions were delayed, a further extension from Aberdare to Middle Duffryn was authorised by the Aberdare Valley Railway Act 1855 (18 & 19 Vict. c. cxx). Middle Duffryn was a focus of coal-mining activity, in time controlled by the Powell Duffryn group. The Aberdare Valley Railway being sponsored by the VoNR, which itself increased its share capital by the Vale of Neath Railway (Capital) Act 1855 (18 & 19 Vict. c. xxv). The Aberdare Valley Railway was leased to the VoNR from the outset, and acquired by it on 1 January 1864; Aberdare Valley shareholders got a guaranteed 7.5% on their capital.

The Dare branch to Nantmelyn Colliery was opened on 7 November 1854. The colliery was on the mountainside west of Aberdare, but the line reached it from Gelli Tarw Junction, and reversing at Dare Junction. A short extension to the Bwllfa Colliery (part of the Merthyr Dare group) at the end of the branch was reached by June 1857.

The Cwmaman colliery branch was opened in November 1856 (Note: Baughan and Barrie; Jones and Dunstone say 1858.) This was reached by continuing on from Dare Junction and curving round the east side of Rhos-gwawr. Both these branches were laid in Barlow rail.

Iron started to be imported from early 1857. Running uphill it was expensive to carry. Nevertheless, the dividend in the first half of 1857 was declared at 4.75%.

After that time the profit and the dividend declined continuously, due to high costs of infrastructure upgrades, and also to congestion at Swansea docks.

=== The Newport, Abergavenny and Hereford Railway ===
The Newport, Abergavenny and Hereford Railway had opened in 1852, and soon formed part of a chain of narrow (standard) gauge railways running from the River Severn to the River Mersey. The London and North Western Railway hoped to acquire it to gain access to Newport Docks, but in the end the NA&HR formed part of the West Midland Railway in 1860, and that in turn was absorbed by the Great Western Railway in 1863.

Long before that, in 1847, the NA&HR had obtained the Newport, Abergavenny and Hereford Railway (Extension to Taff Vale Railway) Act 1847 (10 & 11 Vict. c. clxxvii), giving powers for the Taff Vale Extension, which was to run westward from Pontypool to Quakers Yard, where it would join the Taff Vale Railway. This line had the potential to connect with numerous of the south-to-north lines in the valleys, thereby conveying mineral products from collieries and ironworks on their network to the industrial north of England without having to pass through Cardiff or Newport. The Taff Vale Extension opened progressively from 1855, and many of the junctions with valley lines were only effected in later years.

The NA&HR had as its original purpose a connection between Hereford and Newport Docks, but it was now obvious that the connection to the South Wales Valleys was more lucrative. The rise of Aberdare as a source of high-quality coal was an obvious attraction, and the NA&HR started to talk to the Vale of Neath Railway about linking up.

In fact in 1857 the NA&HR obtained Newport, Abergavenny and Hereford Railway (Branches) Act 1857 (20 & 21 Vict. c. cxix) giving authorisation to extend to Aberdare, and it approached the VoNR concerning a mutual arrangement giving the NA&HR access to Aberdare from Middle Duffryn alongside the Aberdare Valley Railway, effectively part of the VoNR, in exchange for a similar arrangement from Middle Duffryn to Navigation Colliery.

The VoNR turned this proposal down, but in 1860 the idea was revived; it was to include laying a narrow (standard) gauge rail as far as Aberdare station and NA&HR use of the station. Although the SWR-nominated directors on the VoNR board were hostile to the idea, the VoNR were concerned that a rebuff might result in the NA&HR (now merged with others to form the West Midland Railway) building its own line to the Swansea Vale Railway and reaching Swansea independently of the VoNR.

=== Financial results ===
In the first years of the Vale of Neath Railway, business grew steadily and profitability as good. From 1857 this situation began to change. A coal strike, general depression of trade, and heavy costs of maintaining the permanent way, all reduced profit. No dividend was declared in August 1857.

=== The Swansea and Neath Railway ===
Swansea and Neath Railway Act 1861
- Act of Parliament
- Parliament of the United Kingdom
- Long title: An Act to authorize the Construction in the County of Glamorgan of a Railway from the Vale of Neath Railway to the South Wales Railway at Swansea, to be called "The Swansea and Neath Railway."
- Citation: 24 & 25 Vict. c. ccxlii

Dates
- Royal assent: 6 August 1861

Vale of Neath Railway Act 1863
- Act of Parliament
- Parliament of the United Kingdom
- Long title: An Act for the Amalgamation of the Swansea and Neath Railway Company with the Vale of Neath Railway Company, and for authorizing the Vale of Neath Railway Company to make a further Line of Railway, and to raise further Monies; and for other Purposes.
- Citation: 26 & 27 Vict. c. cxx

Dates
- Royal assent: 13 July 1863

Text of statute as originally enacted

The VoNR decided on an unsatisfactory compromise; it would convert most of its network to mixed gauge, and it would assist in the promotion of a Swansea and Neath Railway, a mixed-gauge line. The Swansea and Neath Railway Act 1861 (26 & 27 Vict. c. cxx) received royal assent on 6 April 1861 and the line was opened on 15 July 1863. Passenger operation commenced from a new station in Neath to a temporary platform at Wind Street in Swansea, on 1 August 1863. There were intermediate stations at Neath Abbey and Briton Ferry Road. The Swansea and Neath Railway was absorbed by the VoNR under the terms of the Vale of Neath Railway Act 1863 (26 & 27 Vict. c. cxx).

=== The West Midland Railway ===
The West Midland Railway had been formed in 1860 from the amalgamation of the NA&HR with other lines. It still harboured a desire to reach Aberdare, but in frustration it now considered joining the Taff Vale Railway at Mountain Ash to do so, although this would have deprived it of the possibility of reaching above Aberdare.

For the second time the VoNR reacted defensively and at its own expense laid the third standard-gauge rail on their system, starting the work early in 1863. When completed this offered the West Midland Railway a standard-gauge link over the VoNR from Middle Duffryn to Swansea. This alarmed the broad-gauge Great Western Railway because the West Midland Railway might fall into an alliance with the standard-gauge London and North Western Railway, which could then get access to Swansea. This the GWR could not risk, and they negotiated quickly, absorbing the West Midland Railway in August 1863.

=== Connecting the Taff Vale Extension ===
The Newport, Abergavenny and Hereford Railway, and its successor the West Midland Railway, had opened the Taff Vale Extension Railway as far as Quakers Yard in 1858.

It appears that the West Midland Railway had already made the connection with the Taff Vale Railway at Mountain Ash; at any rate, the Great Western Railway (having amalgamated with the West Midland Railway in 1863) was now remarkably dilatory in completing the Taff Vale Extension Railway through to Middle Duffryn. This may have been because the LNWR had running powers over the former NA&HR line to that point, and the GWR did not wish to encourage its rival.

Nevertheless, on 28 December 1863 the VoNR ran a demonstration narrow gauge engine and brake van from Swansea to Middle Duffryn, and soon afterward a standard-gauge coal train was run from Gadlys Colliery near Aberdare to Swansea. At first, hired LNWR engines were used.

Still the link at Middle Duffryn was uncompleted, until a temporary connection was made on 19 March 1864. The line was more properly opened on 18 April 1864, when two goods trains a day used the connection. Little traffic was carried and the LNWR seem to have been the chief beneficiary. The line opened to passenger traffic on 5 October 1864.

Hitherto passenger trains had run through from Neath to Merthyr Tydfil, and Aberdare passengers had to change at Hirwaun. This was now reversed, with Aberdare becoming the primary route, and Merthyr passengers needing to change at Hirwaun.

=== Absorbed by the Great Western Railway ===
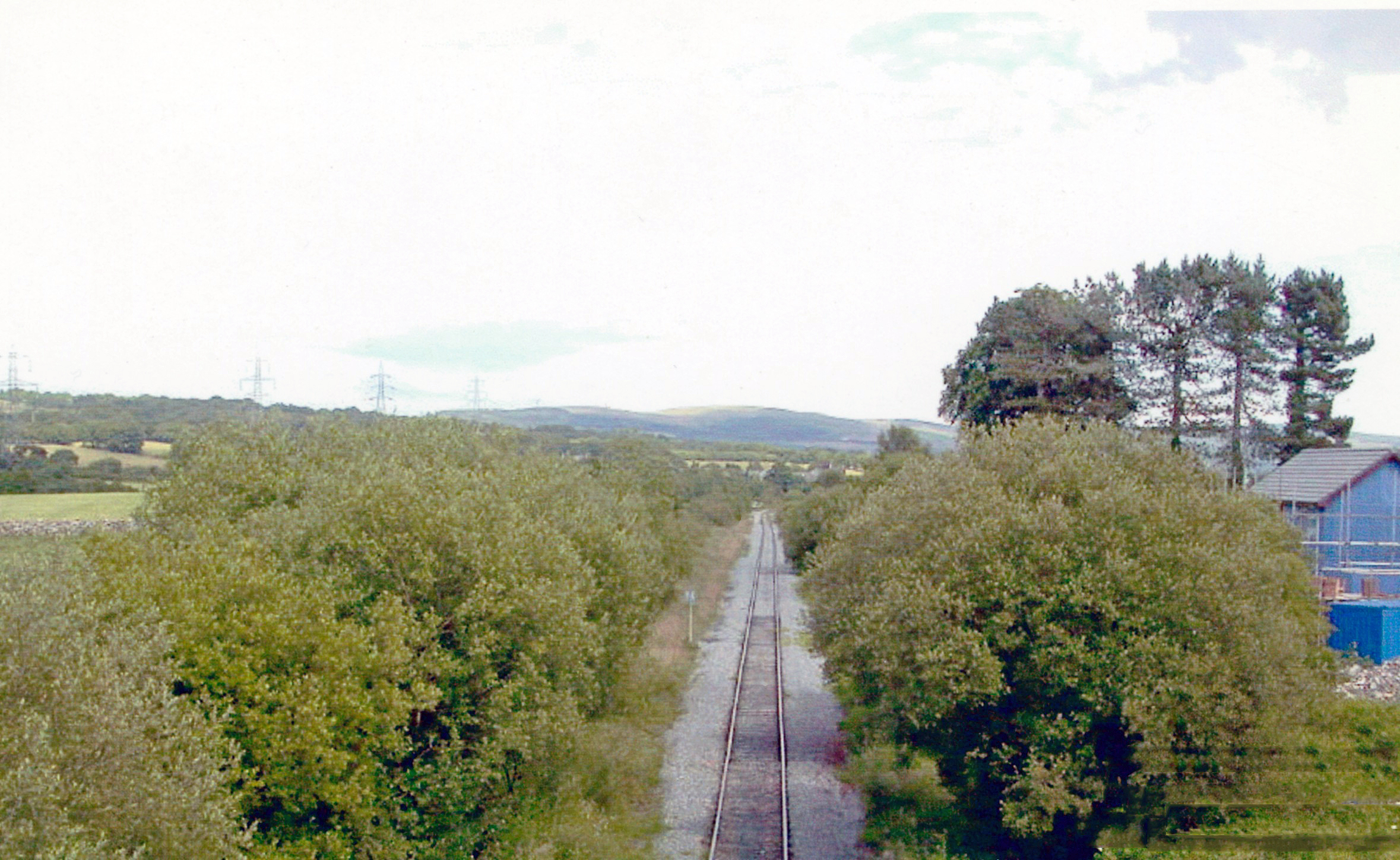
Hirwaun station on the Vale of Neath Railway

The South Wales Railway had long since (in August 1863) been absorbed into the Great Western Railway, and in the same year the GWR had acquired the West Midland Railway, securing standard gauge access for it northwards to the industrial areas of England, and westwards from Pontypool to intersect with many of the valley lines.

The Vale of Neath Railway was now on the shopping list; the advantages of its acquisition to the GWR were numerous. The VoNR directors negotiated skilfully, being aware that considerable capital expenditure on their own line would be necessary in the near future, depressing dividend distributions, and playing on GWR fears of LNWR incursion.

Great Western Railway (Vale of Neath Amalgamation) Act 1866
- Act of Parliament
- Parliament of the United Kingdom
- Long title: An Act for the Amalgamation of the Vale of Neath Railway Company with the Great Western Railway Company; and for other Purposes.
- Citation: 29 & 30 Vict. c. ccclvi

Dates
- Royal assent: 10 August 1866

Terms were agreed, and the absorption took place from 1 February 1865; it was retrospectively authorised by an act of Parliament, the Great Western Railway (Vale of Neath Amalgamation) Act 1866 (29 & 30 Vict. c. ccclvi). (Note: A Bill for the purpose in the 1865 session was withdrawn when running powers were to be granted over the line to the Brecon and Merthyr Railway, but this was not pressed in 1866.)

The Great Western Railway saw the Vale of Neath line and the Taff Vale Extension line as a continuous route, connecting Aberdare and Swansea with the West Midland line to Pontypool and the north. It was a busy and very congested—in fact overloaded—route. The mineral traffic overwhelmed the facilities available for handling it, and the GWR commissioned J. Armstrong to review the problem and its solution. He published a number of proposals. There included enhanced siding accommodation where mineral trains had to be formed, avoiding doing so on the running line; new engine shed arrangements, and the prioritising of long-distance trains over local pick-ups.

In 1871 the Dare Valley section was converted to narrow (standard) gauge and in 1872 the entire main line from Swansea to Middle Duffryn was similarly converted; in 1873 the Merthyr branch received the same treatment. The line from Gelli Tarw Junction to Middle Duffryn was made double track in 1872. These changes were part of a wider initiative by the Great Western Railway in which all main line broad gauge operation in South Wales was converted in May 1872.

The Sirhowy Railway, the property of the LNWR, was used to divert mineral trains for the eastern and southern parts of the GWR away from Pontypool. This depended on good relations with the LNWR, which was not always cooperative, but in time (from 1877) this became the primary route (via Nine Mile Point and Newport). There was a loading restriction on the Crumlin Viaduct and as locomotives in use became heavier, the Sirhowy route also alleviated that problem.

=== Neath and Swansea stations ===
The South Wales Railway station at Neath was located some distance south of the connection to its line from the Vale of Neath Railway. The VoNR used that station, and there was some friction over the management of the station. When the Swansea and Neath Railway opened in 1863, a new Low Level station was built on that line immediately south of the bridge where it passed under the SWR main line.

In 1865 the GWR, having taken over the VoNR, decided to relocate the main line station closer to the Low Level station so as to enable easy interchange. It was called Neath High Level. This proved unpopular with Neath passengers as it was inconveniently located for the town, and in 1877 a new main line station, called Neath General, was opened near the earlier location but a little closer to the town.

Neath Low Level was renamed Bridge Street in 1924, and again renamed as Neath Riverside in 1926.

The Swansea and Neath Railway station in Swansea was at Wind Street, on a viaduct; the booking office and waiting rooms were located in arches. Trains reached the station by crossing a drawbridge over the lock entrance to the North Dock. On 29 November 1865 a coal train ran over the location of the drawbridge when it was open for shipping, and there was a serious accident; the two men on the footplate perished.

Passenger traffic was switched away from Wind Street in 1873, running over the South Wales Main Line from Neath to Swansea High Street, the GWR's main station, and from that time passenger trains did not run on the VoNR (former S&NR) line between Neath and Swansea. (Note: Jones and Dunstone imply cause and effect from the accident and the diversion; but eight years seems a long time lag. Page 103: "Reluctance thereafter to run passenger trains over this harbour bridge and congestion with coal traffic caused the GWR to switch passenger trains...")

Local services resumed on the Swansea and Neath line on 1 October 1881 but used East Dock station as the Swansea terminus, avoiding crossing the site of the accident; the location was remarkably inconvenient for the town. In 1936 this service was again ended; Neath Riverside became a terminus for short-journey trains on the VoNR and for some terminating trains on the Neath and Brecon Railway. During the period when VoNR trains were running to Swansea High Street over the SWR main line, they reversed at Neath General station.

=== North Dock accident, 1865 ===
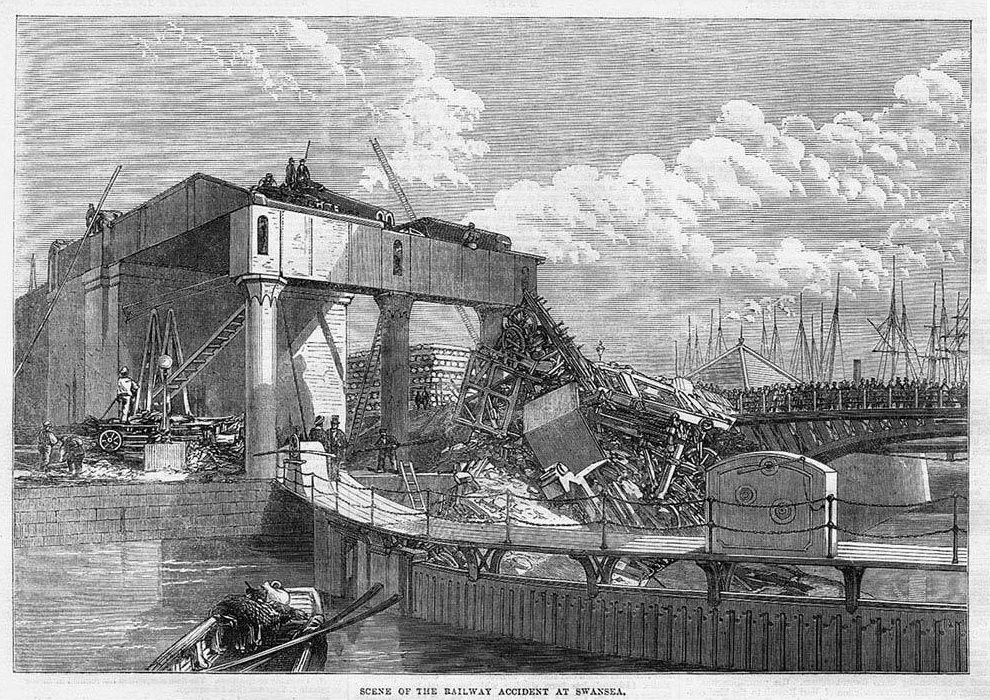
Illustrated London News image of the result of the accident

The accident referred to above took place on 29 November 1865 when an engine and 30 wagons of a coal train fell into the lock chamber of the North Dock at Swansea, running over a drawbridge that should have been closed for the train.

There were four signal stations in close succession, and each was required to give "line clear" having ascertained that the drawbridges and other hazards were in the correct position. The men had been working 16- or 17-hour shifts consistently, and one of them gave line clear even though the drawbridge was open. A red warning light was exhibited automatically by the bridge being open, but the train driver was struggling to get his engine working on slippery rails; it was a tank engine running bunker first and the driver consequently had his back to the direction of travel. In addition there was smoke haze from copper smelting works, limiting visibility. He and his fireman died by drowning in the accident.

Incidentally, by the act of Parliament authorising the line, "the company is compelled to open the drawbridges [to shipping] and keep them open for 2 1/2 hours before high water and 1 1/2 hours after high water, for each tide. The passenger and coal traffic usually ceases about half past 8 o'clock p.m. and is resumed about 4 a.m."

== Timber viaducts ==
There were a number of timber viaducts on the line from the beginning. The River Neath viaduct at the southern end of the line was 810 feet (250 m) in length; it was replaced in 1875 partly by embankment. There were three other crossings of the River Neath using timber viaduct construction. Pencaedrain Viaduct between Glynneath and Hirwaun had eight spans on a 30-chain (600 m) radius curve.

On the Merthyr arm of the line there were three viaducts, one at Abernant and two at Merthyr. Merthyr Viaduct had 27 spans totalling 990 feet (300 m) in length. All these bridges and viaducts were replaced in the 1870s except two river bridges at Resolven, replaced in 1894 and 1896.

The Dare branch from Gelli Tarw Junction had two viaducts, Gamlyn Viaduct (13 spans) and Dare Viaduct (11 spans). The Dare branch closed in 1939 but the viaducts remained in place until 1947; accordingly they were the very last Brunel timber viaducts to survive.

The Dare Viaduct was subject to the problems of thermal expansion in June 1857; Brunel reported that

The traffic upon the Dare Branch was interrupted for a short time by the singular effects of the rails upon the Dare Viaduct from the excessive heat at the end of June. The line being here upon a sharp curve, the expansion of the Rails forced the Viaduct sideways a few inches and disturbed the Line, so as to render it impassable. The Rails and the Viaduct were soon restored to their correct position, and any recurrence of the same thing, however improbable, guarded against upon this and other Viaducts under similar circumstances by the introduction of expanding joints on the rails.

== Engine power ==
The dominant theme of the Vale of Neath Railway was the transport of large quantities of Aberdare coal to London, and towards Southampton and Liverpool (for bunkering ships). At the closing years of the 19th century this was largely handled by 0-6-0 saddle tank locomotives, which ran through from Aberdare to Swindon; with a water capacity of 1,060 gallons this was a prodigious feat, albeit with frequent stops for water columns.

From 1896 the GWR built more powerful tender engines for the traffic, but the first 4-6-0s were unsuccessful, and it was not until the "Aberdare" 2-6-0s were introduced that the trains had reliably better locomotives. Seventeen of the class were based at Aberdare in 1903. Even so, these were considered capable of improvement, and the 2800 class 2-8-0s were felt to be much better. They were allocated to Aberdare from 1906, although the Aberdare class maintained near dominance there at least until 1923. The 4200 class of 2-8-0T followed, and were especially successful where high power on relatively short runs was required. Some of the 4200 class were converted to 2-8-2T with a much larger bunker, and were useful in handling longer distance runs.

In the 1920s ROD 2-8-0 engines were in use, and after 1945 the later design of Austerity 2-8-0 appeared, as well as Stanier 2-8-0s of the 8F type.

== Halts ==
The count of stations on the original line of the VoNR was rather limited. In the twentieth century a number of halts were opened; Melyncourt Halt was a small wooden platform; Clyne Halt opened in 1905 to serve the Resolven Tinplate Works. Cwmrhyd-y-Gau Halt operated from 1935 to 1945 to serve the Abernant Brick and Tile Works; British Rhondda Halt was opened for miners at an adjacent colliery of the same name. It had a platform on the down line only; terminating up trains reached it by reversing back over a crossover. It opened in 1906 but in 1911 it was replaced by a two-platform halt called Pontwalby, a short distance to the north.

Rhigos Halt was opened in 1911, and Hirwaun Pond Halt was opened in 1941 for the use of workers at a nearby armaments factory.

Trecynon Halt was a mile west of Aberdare, and there were two halts east of that point, Cwmbach and Duffryn Crossing; these were served by a rail motor service from Swansea East Dock to Mountain Ash.

Cwmaman Colliery also had a railmotor service; there were halts at Black Lion Crossing, from 1903. The service was for workmen only at first, but in 1906 three more halts were opened and the service became public. It did not make a direct connection with the rest of the passenger network.

== Later history ==
=== From 1923 ===
The Railways Act 1921 dictated that most of the railways of Great Britain should be "grouped" into four large companies. The Great Western Railway continued in name and in fact; certain other large South Wales railway companies including the Taff Vale Railway were constituents of the new company. The changes took effect immediately prior to the beginning of 1923.

During the Second World War a considerable number of munitions and other war materials factories were in operation along the line and a number of workmen's passenger services were operated in order that workers could reach new workplaces. The Royal Ordnance Factory at Hirwaun was a particular centre of this activity, thirteen trains each way being operated, mostly reversing at Rhigos carriage sidings.

=== Closures ===
The line depended for its business on coal mining, and as that industry declined, so the railway came into question. The Merthyr line passenger service was ended on 31 December 1962, and the main line lost its passenger service from 15 June 1964, and Glyn Neath to Hirwaun closed completely on 2 October 1967.

On 29 November 1971, Aberdare (High Level: the VoNR station) to Middle Duffryn was closed completely.

=== Aberdare reopening ===
Aberdare was an important community that had lost its passenger train service in 1964, although a basic freight service continued. In 1973 the route was restored for goods service, connecting from Abercynon over the former Taff Vale line as far as Abercwmboi. The reinstated route then crossed the Cynon to the north side by a new bridge (though very close to the alignment of a much earlier TVR connection to Werfa Colliery) then following the VoNR route to Aberdare station, at the site of the former High Level. From there the line continued on the VoNR route to Tower Collery, near Hirwaun.

The new Aberdare station opened on the site of the former High Level station, on 3 October 1988.

== Present-day use ==
Accordingly, at present (2017) a short length at Merthyr, and a slightly longer section at Aberdare, are in passenger use. At Aberdare mineral traffic from Tower Colliery runs from Hirwaun and continues towards Abercynon.

The Swansea and Neath Railway route between Swansea Eastern Dock and Cardonnel Junction near Briton Ferry is still in use, although it was hugely developed in the early twentieth century and then "rationalised" in the later part of the century, so that the earlier route is not exactly followed.

== Location list ==
=== Aberdare to Swansea ===
- Middle Duffryn Junction; end on junction with Taff Vale Extension line;
- Cwmbach Halt; opened 12 July 1914; closed 15 June 1964; reopened as Cwmbach 3 October 1988; still open;
- Aberdare Canal Wharf;
- Aberdare; opened 24 September 1851; renamed Aberdare High Level 1924; closed 15 June 1964; reopened as Aberdare 3 October 1988; still open;
- Trecynon Halt; opened 1 May 1911; closed 15 June 1964;
- Gelli Tarw Junction; convergence of Merthyr Line and Dare Valley lines;
- Merthyr Road; opened 24 September 1851; closed 2 November 1853;
- Hirwain; opened 24 September 1851; renamed Hirwaun 1928; closed 15 June 1964;
- Hirwaun Pond Halt; opened 23 July 1941; closed after 1945 but possibly reopened for trading estate; closed 15 June 1964;
- Rhigos Halt; opened 1 May 1911; closed 15 June 1964;
- Pencaedrain Tunnel; 526 yards;
- Pontwalby Halt; opened 1 May 1911; closed 15 June 1964;
- British Rhondda Halt; opened 27 August 1906; closed 1 May 1911;
- Cwmrhyd-y-Gau Halt; opened 14 January 1935 for miners only; closed by October 1945;
- Glyn Neath; opened 24 September 1851; closed 15 June 1964;
- Resolven; opened 24 September 1851; closed 15 June 1964;
- Melyncourt Halt; opened 1 June 1905; closed 15 June 1964;
- Clyne Halt; opened 1 June 1905; closed 15 June 1964;
- Aberdylais; opened 24 September 1851; Aberdylais Halt from 1954; closed 15 June 1964; possibly known as Aberdulais and also Aberdulass in early days;
- Neath Junction;
- Neath; South Wales Railway station.

=== Merthyr line ===
- Merthyr; opened 2 November 1853; sometimes known as Merthyr High Street; renamed Merthyr Tydfil 1980; still open;
- Merthyr Tunnel; 2,497 yards;
- Abernant; opened June 1854; closed 31 December 1962;
- Llwydcoed; opened 2 November 1853; closed 31 December 1962;
- Gelli Tarw Junction; above.

=== Swansea and Neath Railway ===
- N&B Junction; convergence of Neath and Brecon Railway;
- Neath (Low Level); opened 1 August 1863; closed 1 August 1878; reopened 1 October 1880; renamed Neath Bridge Street 1924; renamed Neath Riverside 1926; closed except for school trains 15 October 1962; closed completely 15 June 1964;
- Neath Abbey; opened 1 August 1863; closed 1 March 1873; reopened 1 October 1880; closed 28 September 1936;
- Cardonnel Halt; opened 1 June 1905; closed 28 September 1936;
- Briton Ferry Road; opened 1 August 1863; closed 1 March 1873; reopened 1 October 1880; closed 28 September 1936;
- Swansea East Dock; opened 1 October 1880; closed 28 September 1936;
- Danygraig Halt; opened 14 March 1895: closed 28 September 1936
- Drawbridge;
- Wind Street Junction;
- Swansea Wind Street; opened 1 August 1863; closed 1 March 1873;
- South Dock.

=== Dare Valley branch ===
Mineral branch line; a passenger service was opened 1 January 1906; restricted to miners 1918; fully reopened 7 July 1919; restricted to miners 22 September 1924; fully closed to passengers about 1932.

- Cwmaman Colliery;
- Cwmaman Colliery Halt;
- Cwmaman Crossing Halt;
- Cwmneol Halt;
- Godreaman Halt;
- Ton Llwyd Halt;
- Black Lion Crossing Halt;
- Dare Junction; divergence of mineral line to Bwllfa Colliery;
- Gelli Tarw Junction; above.

== Early locomotives ==
The Vale of Neath Railway owned 19 broad gauge and 6 standard gauge locomotives:

- Nos 1–6 4-4-0ST broad gauge locomotives delivered in 1851
- Nos 7–9 4-4-0ST broad gauge locomotives delivered in 1854, rebuilt as 0-6-0STs in 1858
- Nos 10–12 0-6-0ST broad gauge locomotives delivered in 1854
- Nos 13–15 0-6-0ST broad gauge locomotives delivered in 1856
- Nos 16–19 0-6-0ST broad gauge locomotives delivered in 1861
- Nos 20–23 0-6-0ST standard gauge locomotives
- Nos 24–25 0-8-0T broad gauge locomotives delivered in 1864
