= Cathays railway works =

Former railway development in Cardiff

Coordinates: 51°29′31.75″N 3°11′6.33″W

Cathays railways works was a railway engineering development by the Taff Vale Railway to provide its main carriage and wagon works, as well as its main railway depot for the entire TVR system, located in the Cathays suburb of Cardiff, South Wales.

Taken over by the Great Western Railway, after nationalisation under British Railways they sold off the carriage and wagon works to the Pullman Company Ltd. Today, both the site of the railway depot and the carriage and wagon works have been redeveloped, mainly with buildings and commercial activities associated with the University of Cardiff.

== History ==
The original locomotive works and drawing offices of the TVR were located in the West Yard of Cardiff Docks, co-located there so that use could be made of the local boiler makers skills. However, the TVR towards the end of the 19th century found it commercially advantageous to outsource the heavy industrialised work of building locomotives. Hence the West Yard facility became a heavy overhaul shop, something which the GWR on inheriting the TVR didn't change, as they had access to the Caerphilly railway works of the former-Rhymney Railway. The last locomotive to be built at West Yard was the power unit for No. 1 steam railcar, in 1903.

However, the TVR still needed a carriage and wagon works, so reliant were they on the transportation of coal. Ideally located close to Cardiff Docks, the site chosen was just north of Cathays railway station, as the line headed towards Llandaf railway station, in the Cathays suburb of Cardiff.

=== Carriage and wagon works ===
A 6-road facility north of the TVR mainline, the carriage and wagon works were capable of both producing and maintaining the complete TVR and private owner range of rolling stock. The works was assured of work, as the TVR handled some 10,000 coal wagons and a further 3,000 pieces of passenger and other freight stock.

The GWR for the same reasons of revenue protection fully maintained the facility, but with the introduction of steel wagons post-World War II, British Railways saw no need for the continued use of the facility. They hence sold off the business and leased the site to the Pullman Company Ltd, who maintained their own carriages along with some private owner wagons and BR stock. By the mid-1980s, the site was virtually unstaffed, occasionally used for over-day holding of engineers trains that were travelling into or from the valleys.

=== Cathays depot ===
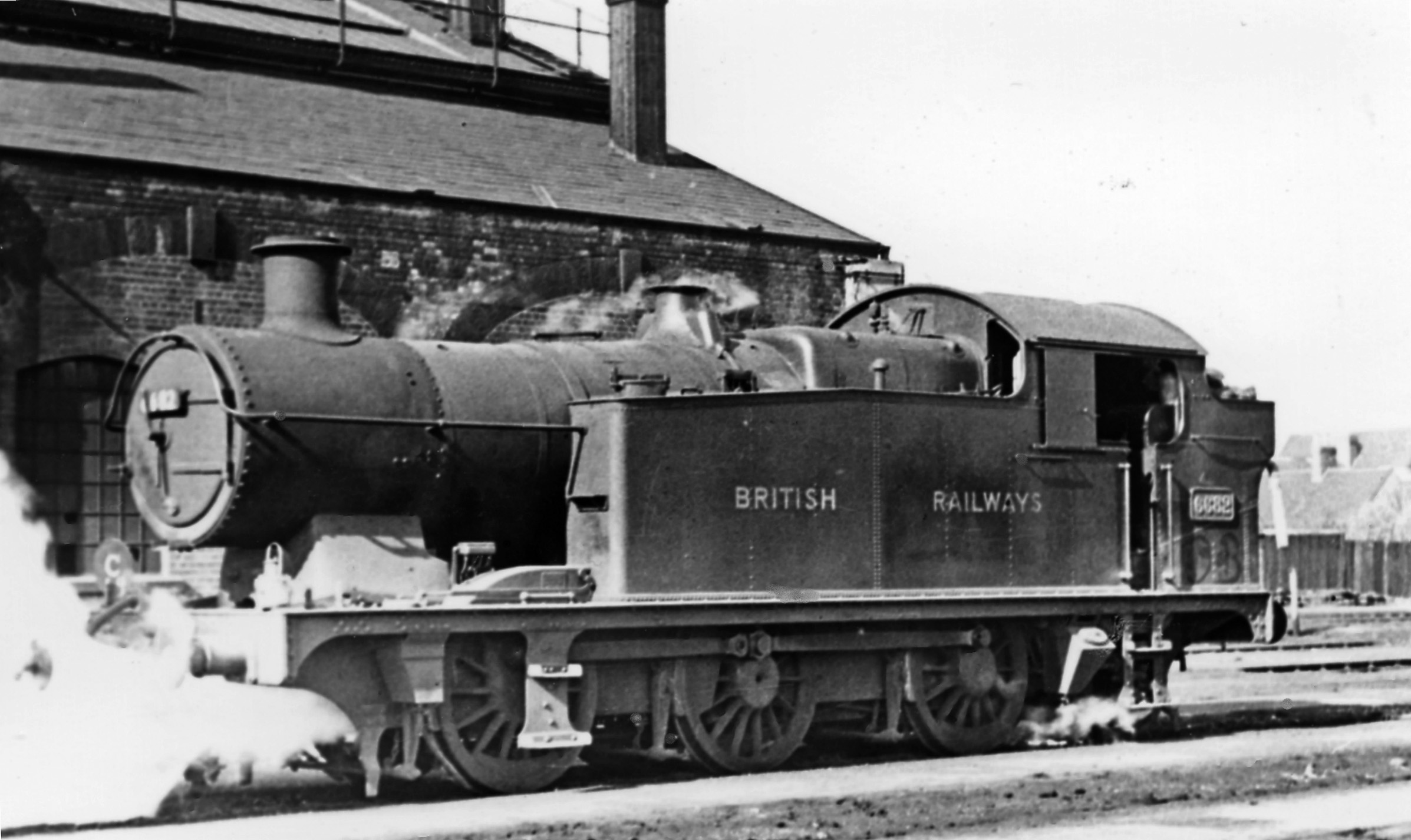
Ex-GWR Collett-designed 5600 Class 0-6-2T No.6682 simmers in April 1951, outside the former TVR railway depot at Cathays

Located on the southside of the tracks to the carriage and wagon works, parallel to Colum Road, it was the largest railway depot on the TVR. Opened in 1884, it was equipped with a five-road shed and an attached five-road repair shop, each under its own bay built from local brick. The roofs were to a similar pattern, each with extensive glazing on both faces. The GWR had supplied a standard-pattern over-grider 55 feet (17 m) pattern railway turntable, which was never extended as it could cope with the tank engines allocated to the site.

Designated by the GWR as the divisional shed of the Cardiff Valleys Division, under the Loans and Guarantees Act (1929): the track layout was improved; a new corrugated roof installed; and a new ramp added to the GWR standard-pattern single-road coaling stage.

By 1950 under British Railways, the combined depots of Cathays and Radyr (Code:88A), had a complement of 82 locomotives, all tank-types: 2x2-8-2T; 62x0-6-2T; 15x0-6-0T; 3x0-4-2T. In 1959 the shed was divided to cope with the introduction of diesel multiple units. In 1961 the shed closed to steam, and all steam locomotives were moved to Radyr. The shed closed completely in November 1964, with the opening of the newly diesel-redeveloped Cardiff Canton TMD. Shortly afterwards the site was cleared for redevelopment.

== Present ==
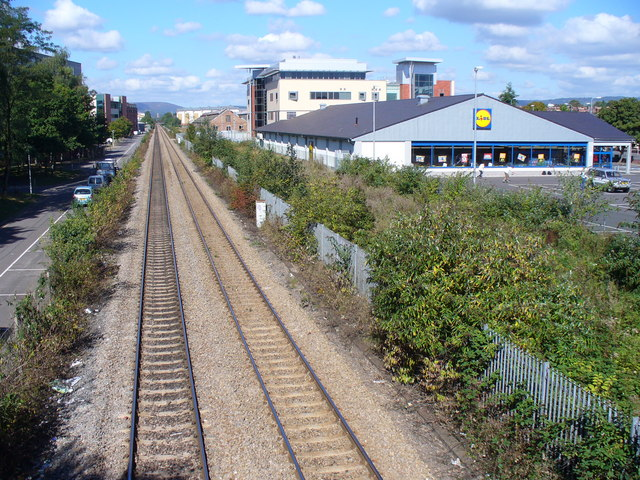
The site today, 15 September 2007. To the left is Colum Drive, marking the site of the earlier demolished Cathays depot. To the right is a Lidl store, a later development on the site of the former carriage and wagon works. Beyond the store is a newly developed student accommodation block

The site of the former depot was left as scrub land until the late 1980s, when redevelopment started with the creation of the new Colum Drive, which runs parallel and adjacent to the railway line. Most of the land was redeveloped with buildings and activities associated with the University of Cardiff.

The former carriage and wagon works buildings were still in existence until the early 2000s, when they too were demolished. The site now houses a new kit-built Lidl store, and to its north a university optometry unit and student accommodation block.
