= Cardiff West Yard Locomotive Works =

Former railway locomotive works in Wales

Coordinates: 51.467°N 3.168°W

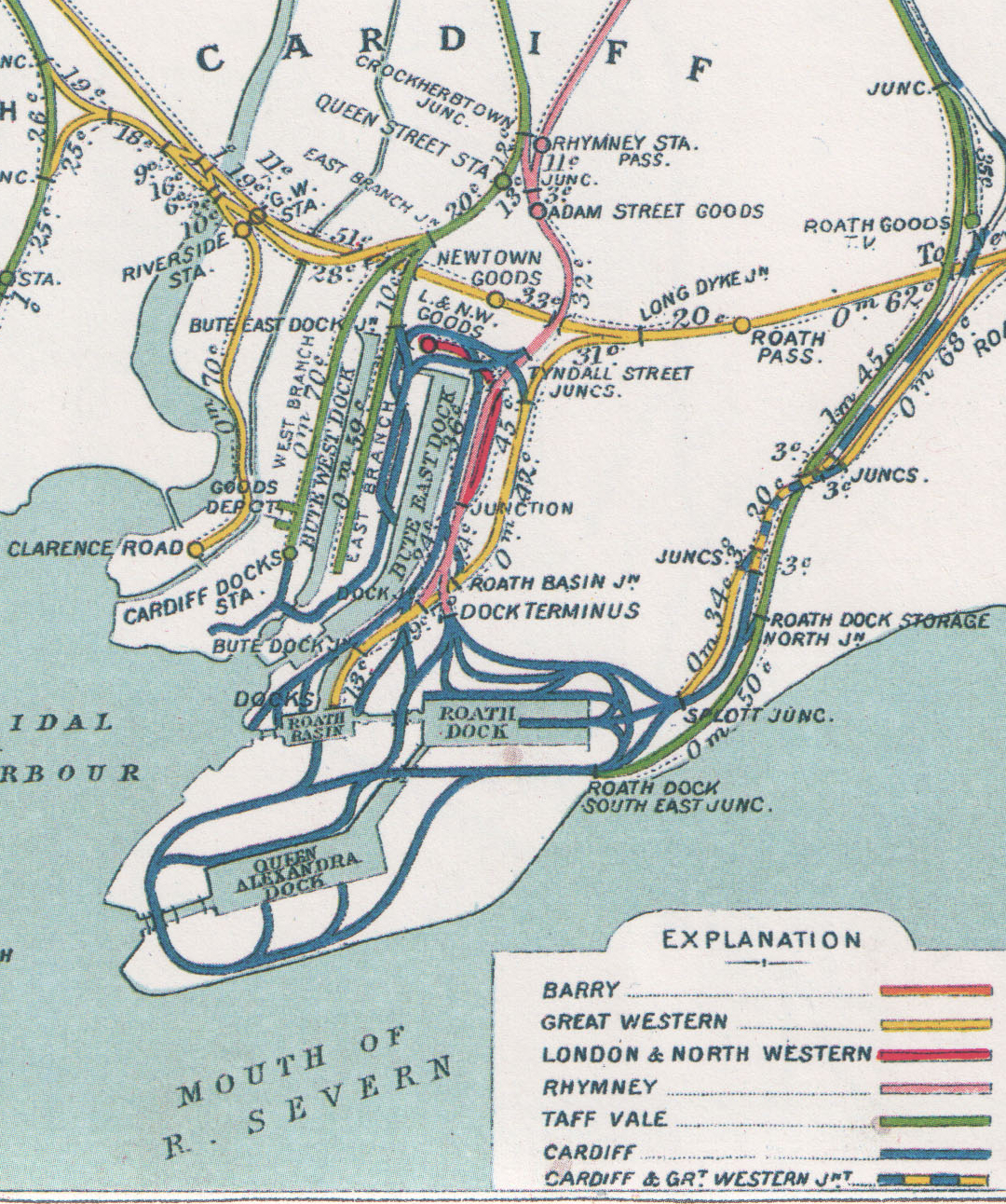
Part of a 1911 Railway Clearing House junction diagram showing railways in Cardiff, with the West Yard Works circled in red.

West Yard Works was the Taff Vale Railway's locomotive repair and construction factory. It was located in Cardiff between Bute Street and the Glamorganshire Canal, about 100 metres west of Bute Dock railway station (which is now Cardiff Bay railway station).

== History ==
A small engine shed with room for one locomotive and a repair shop was built there when the railway was constructed in 1839, but much of the work was carried out in the open air.

In 1846 Henry Clement was appointed the railway's Resident Engineer and he had a locomotive works built there. In 1857 the first locomotive was built at the works, 'Venus' a small 2-4-0 passenger loco.

When the Taff Vale introduced the 0-6-2T type, which was to become ubiquitous across South Wales, the works traverser could not accommodate the longer wheelbase, requiring locomotives to have their trailing radial wheels removed while within the works.

The works could be accessed only by level crossings accessed by turntables on the main line near the railway's terminus at Bute Road station.

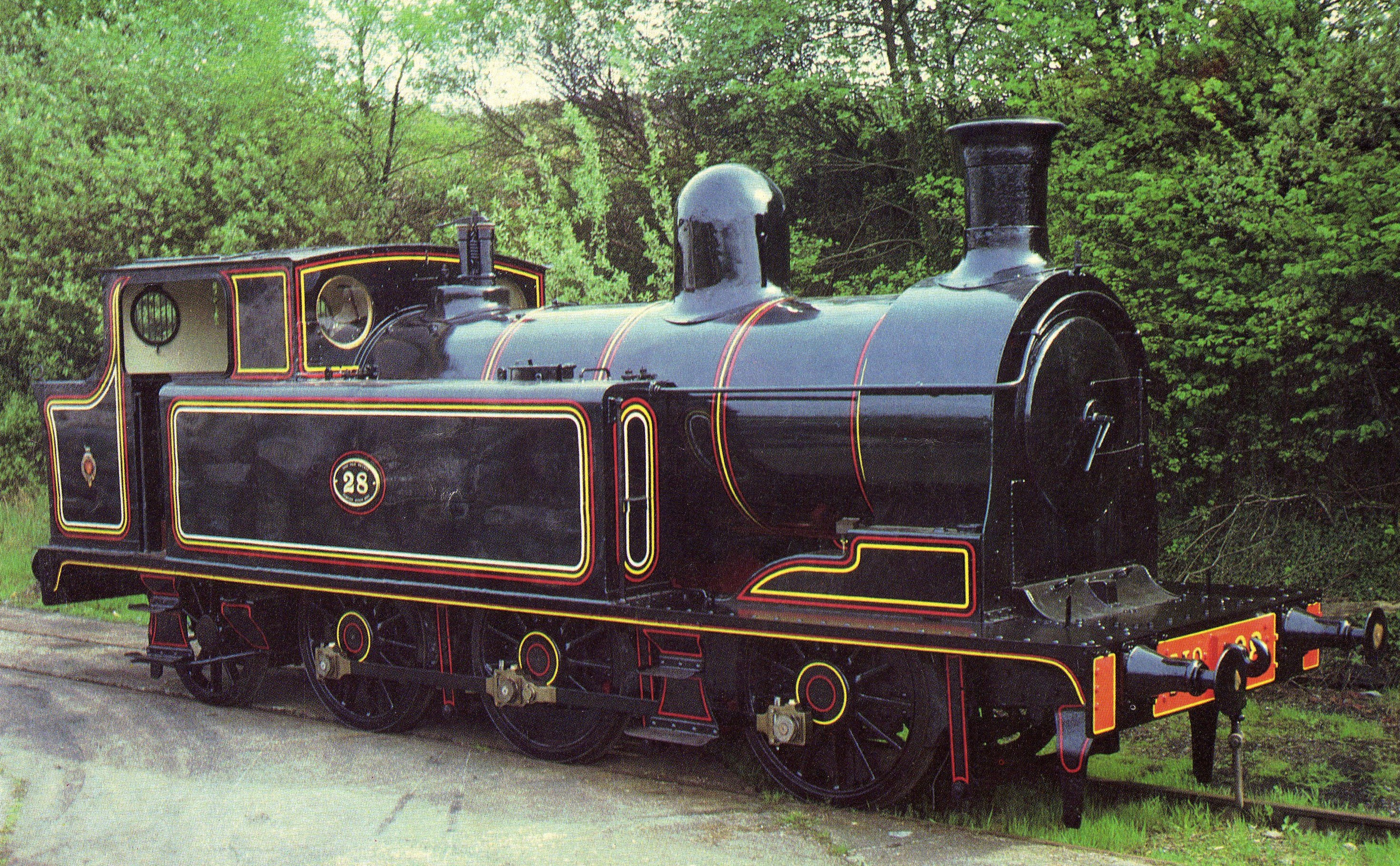
Taff Vale Railway O1 class loco No. 28, built at the West Yard Works in 1897.

Shortage of space finally led Tom Hurry Riches, then the railway's Locomotive Superintendent to suspend locomotive building by the company after the completion of the O1 class in 1897. However, in 1903 a small steam engine unit for the company's first rail motor was built there, while the carriage part was built at their Cathays Carriage and Wagon Works. Motors were built by outside contractors.

After the Great War plans emerged to build a new works at Radyr, but as the company was to amalgamate with the Great Western Railway and other South Wales companies in 1922, that plan was abandoned and Great Western subsequently concentrated major locomotive repair work in South Wales at the former Rhymney Railway's Caerphilly Works.

New workshops were constructed at Caerphilly. After they opened, West Yard Works closed on 28 August 1926, and the remaining workforce transferred to Caerphilly.

== Surviving locomotive ==
The exact number of locomotives built at West Yard is uncertain. Records were not kept thoroughly, and some locomotives officially considered "new" were in fact constructed from parts recovered from older locomotives. The approximate number is 84, primarily 0-6-0s of the A, B and L classes, over fifty being built between 1856 and 1889. There were also fifteen 0-6-2T of the M, O and O1 classes (1891–97); four 2-4-0 (1857–79); four 0-4-4T (1876–83); and three 4-4-0T (1884–85). The final "locomotive" built at West Yard was an 0-2-2 railmotor, in 1903.

One locomotive built at West Yard has survived, the last standard gauge machine built in Wales. No 28, an O1 class 0-6-2T is part of the National Collection, currently under restoration at Gwili Railway.
