= Llandough Platform railway station =

British railway station

Llandough Platform

General information
- Location: Llandough, Vale of Glamorgan; Wales
- Coordinates: 51.4508°N 3.1928°W
- Grid reference: ST172731
- Platforms: 2

Other information
- Status: Disused

History
- Original company: Taff Vale Railway
- Pre-grouping: Taff Vale Railway

Key dates
- 13 June 1904: opened
- 1 June 1918: closed
Location

Llandough Platform was a short-lived railway station which served the village of Llandough in the Vale of Glamorgan.

The station was at the head of the Llandough Sidings, which had a capacity of 978 wagons. The station closed in 1918, after a mere fourteen years.

No trace remains of the station today. The Llandough Sidings no longer exist, and the site was wasteground by the late 1980s, with the location of Llandough Platform marked by a signpost.

Preceding station	Disused railways	Following station
Grangetown	Great Western Railway; Taff Vale	Penarth Dock
