= Pentre Platform railway station =

Short-lived railway station in Pentre, Rhondda Cynon Taf

Pentre Platform

General information
- Location: Pentre, Glamorgan; Wales

Other information
- Status: Disused

History
- Original company: Taff Vale Railway
- Pre-grouping: Taff Vale Railway

Key dates
- October 1904: Opened
- November 1912: Closed

Pentre Platform railway station served the village of Pentre, in the historical county of Glamorgan, Wales, from 1904 to 1912 on the Rhondda Valley Branch of the Taff Vale Railway.

== History ==
The station was opened in October 1904 by the Taff Vale Railway. It closed in November 1912 as that was when it was last in the timetables.

Preceding station	Historical railways	Following station
Treorchy; Line open, station closed	Taff Vale Railway	Ton Pentre; Line open, station closed
