= Lower Penarth railway station =

Former railway station on the Taff Vale Railway in Wales

Lower Penarth Halt

General information
- Location: Penarth, Vale of Glamorgan; Wales
- Coordinates: 51.4219°N 3.1754°W
- Grid reference: ST183698
- Platforms: 2

Other information
- Status: Disused

History
- Original company: Taff Vale Railway
- Pre-grouping: Taff Vale Railway
- Post-grouping: Great Western Railway

Key dates
- 1 December 1888: Station opens as Lower Penarth
- 30 September 1935: Station renamed Lower Penarth Halt
- 14 June 1954: Station closes
Location

Lower Penarth Halt was a station on the now completely removed double track branch from Penarth to Biglis Junction, Cadoxton in Glamorgan, South Wales.

The station opened in 1888. It had two platforms, with shelters on each, and a substantial waiting room on the 'up' platform. It had no footbridge, though a level crossing was supplied.

The Great Western Railway downgraded the station to a halt in 1935, a fate shared by most other stations on the branch. It closed in 1954, fourteen years before the rest of the branch. The platform and waiting room had been completely removed to ground level prior to 1966, and the site to the west (former up line side) is now occupied by bungalows, some of the trackbed having been sold off to private homeowners. The trackbed from just south of Lower Penarth to Penarth town centre is now a railway walk.)

Preceding station	Disused railways	Following station
Lavernock	Great Western Railway; Taff Vale	Alberta Place Halt
