= Tylacoch Halt railway station =

Short-lived railway station in Ynyswen, Rhondda Cynon Taf

Tylacoch Halt

General information
- Location: Ynyswen, Glamorgan; Wales
- Coordinates: 51.6643°N 3.5193°W
- Grid reference: SS950972

Other information
- Status: Disused

History
- Original company: Taff Vale Railway
- Pre-grouping: Taff Vale Railway

Key dates
- October 1906: Opened
- November 1912: Closed
Location

Tylacoch Halt railway station served the village of Ynyswen, in the historic county of Glamorgan, Wales, from 1906 to 1912 on the Taff Vale Railway.

== History ==
The station was opened in October 1906 by the Taff Vale Railway. It was a short-lived station, only being open for six years before closing in November 1912. Ynyswen opened on the site in 1986.

| Preceding station | Historical railways | Following station |
|---|---|---|
| Treherbert; Line and station open | Taff Vale Railway | Treorchy; Line and station open |
