= Commercial Street Platform railway station =

Short-lived railway station in Aberdare, Rhondda Cynon Taf

Commercial Street Platform

General information
- Location: Aberdare, Glamorganshire; Wales
- Coordinates: 51.7144°N 3.4432°W
- Grid reference: SO003027
- Platforms: 1

Other information
- Status: Disused

History
- Original company: Taff Vale Railway
- Pre-grouping: Taff Vale Railway

Key dates
- 26 November 1904: Opened
- June 1912: Closed
Location

Commercial Street Platform railway station served the town of Aberdare, in the historical county of Glamorganshire, Wales, from 1904 to 1912 on the Aberdare Railway.

== History ==
The station was opened on 26 November 1904 by the Taff Vale Railway. There was only one train a day. They didn't let workmen on the train with dirty clothes. It was a short-lived station; the last train was in June 1912.

Preceding station	Disused railways	Following station
Aberdare Low Level; Line and station closed	Taff Vale Railway; Aberdare Railway	Mill Street Platform; Line and station closed
