= Incline Top railway station =

Disused railway station in Wales

Top of the Incline

General information
- Location: Treharris, Rhondda Cynon Taf; Wales
- Coordinates: 51.650885°N 3.3181774°W
- Grid reference: ST089955
- Platforms: 2?

Other information
- Status: Disused

History
- Original company: Taff Vale Railway

Key dates
- 1846: Opens as Incline Top
- May 1849: Renamed Top of the Incline
- 1 January 1858: Closed
Location

Incline Top railway station, later Top of the Incline was a short-lived early railway station on the Taff Vale Railway in South Wales, located at Penlocks, Treharris.

The station was on the original section of the line between Abercynon and Quakers Yard, which was to the left of the present-day line. The eponymous Incline was a steep gradient of 1 in 22, and trains required a stationary winding engine (installed by Brunel) to surmount it. The station was accessible only by a steep flight of steps leading to the bottom of a deep cutting in the incline. The station's life was brief and it closed after 12 years. The original line was eventually abandoned completely and replaced in 1864.

After the station closed, it was left to decay until being largely destroyed by a violent cyclone on 27 October 1913, a storm, which caused considerable damage across the district, including destroying the spire of St. Mary's Church, Glyntaff. The site of the station is now overgrown with trees and is not easily noticeable.

Preceding station	Disused railways	Following station
Abercynon; Line & station open	Taff Vale Railway	Quakers Yard; Line & station open
