= Lavernock railway station =

Former railway station in Wales

Lavernock

General information
- Location: Vale of Glamorgan; Wales
- Coordinates: 51.4105°N 3.1831°W
- Grid reference: ST178686
- Platforms: 2

Other information
- Status: Disused

History
- Original company: Taff Vale Railway
- Pre-grouping: Taff Vale Railway
- Post-grouping: Great Western Railway

Key dates
- 1 Dec. 1887: Station opens
- 7 Oct. 1963: Closed to goods
- 6 May 1968: Closed to passengers
Location

Lavernock railway station served the coastal village of Lavernock in South Wales until the 1960s.

== History ==
The station was located on an embankment just south of the lane (Fort Road) leading to Lavernock Point and Marconi Holiday Village. It was about 280 metres north of the road leading to St Mary's Well Bay. It had two platforms linked by a metal footbridge, with a substantial stone building on the 'down' side, and a smaller wooden shelter on the other. The signal box opened in 1893.

Lavernock was well-used until the mid-20th century. In 1922, it saw 14 passenger trains each weekday. Five of these were railmotor services. Patronage deteriorated in the postwar years. By 1960, the station was classified as a halt (though the name did not appear on the nameboards), and the larger waiting room had been demolished. The signal box closed on 23 January 1963, and through goods traffic ended on 7 October. With Penarth cement works still functional until 1968, goods traffic was worked to the works from the Penarth end of the branch, through passenger trains having ceased between Penarth and Cadoxton (via Biglis Junction), on 4 May 1968, following which date the track was lifted.

The station closed on 6 May 1968. The site is now privately owned. The platforms still exist, and the old goods shed still stands and is owned by a private firm who specialise in Meter Services, and has been maintained in a good condition. An old workman's hut still exists, but is now in a very poor condition.

Preceding station	Disused railways	Following station
Swanbridge	Great Western Railway; Taff Vale	Lower Penarth
