= Alberta Place Halt railway station =

Former railway station on the Taff Vale Railway in Wales

Coordinates: 51.4301°N 3.1748°W

Alberta Place Halt

General information
- Location: Penarth, Vale of Glamorgan; Wales
- Grid reference: ST184707

Other information
- Status: Disused

History
- Original company: Taff Vale Railway
- Pre-grouping: Taff Vale Railway
- Post-grouping: Great Western Railway

Key dates
- 19 September 1904: Station opens as Alberta Place Platform
- 1 October 1923: Station renamed Alberta Place Halt
- 6 May 1968: Station closes
Location

Alberta Place Halt was a railway station in the Welsh county of Glamorgan.

== History ==
The station was opened by the Taff Vale Railway, becoming part of the Great Western Railway during the Grouping of 1923. The line then passed on to the Western Region of British Railways on nationalisation in 1948. It was then closed by the British Railways Board.

== The site today ==
The station has now been demolished. The former trackbed is a linear path and walk.

Preceding station	Disused railways	Following station
Lower Penarth	Great Western Railway; Taff Vale	Penarth Town
