= Aberdare Low Level railway station =

Disused railway station in Aberdare, Wales

Coordinates: 51°42′46.6″N 3°26′29.3″W

Aberdare Low Level
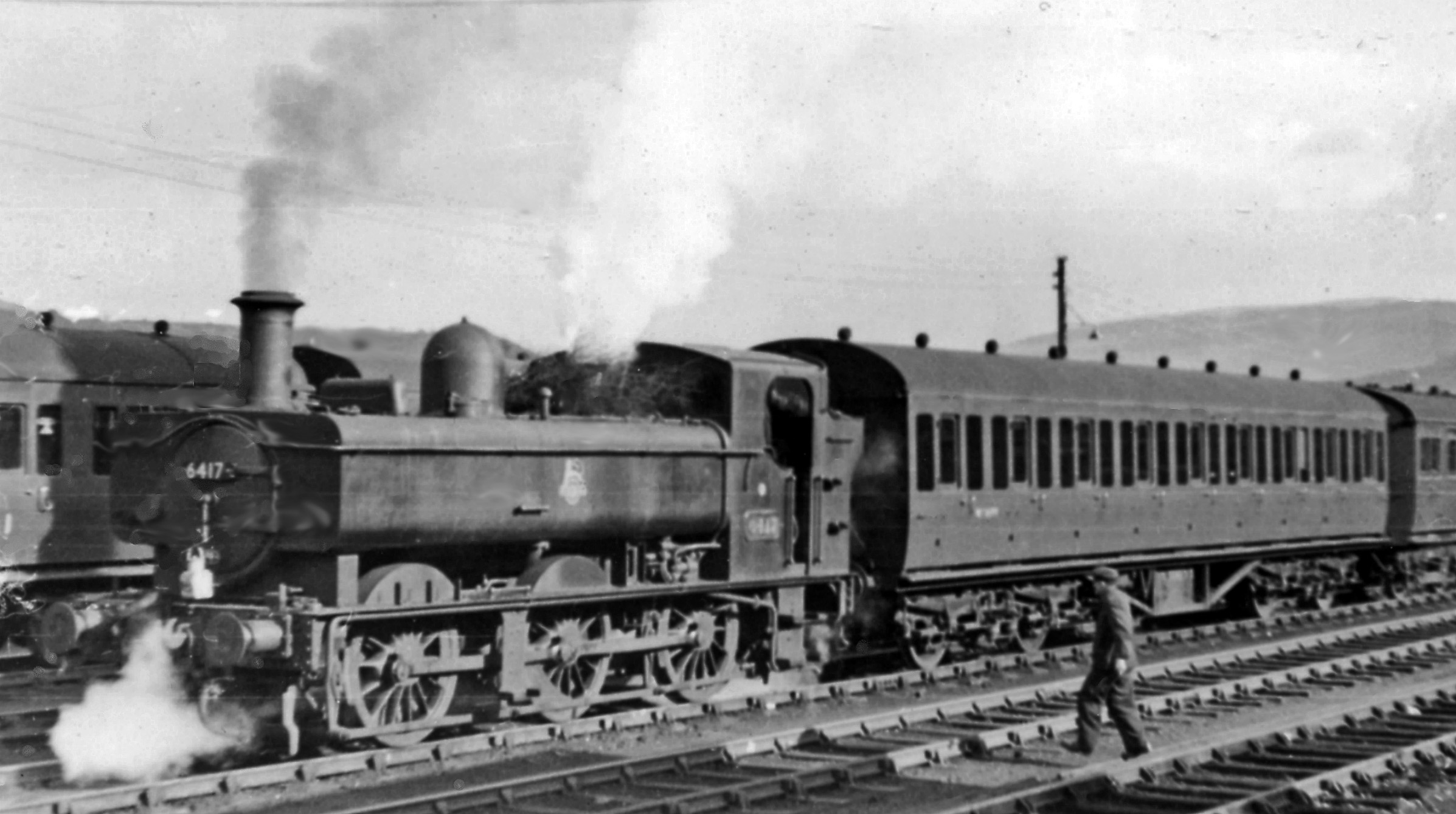
- The station in 1954

General information
- Location: Aberdare, Rhondda Cynon Taf; Wales
- Platforms: 1

Other information
- Status: Disused

History
- Original company: Aberdare Railway
- Pre-grouping: Taff Vale Railway
- Post-grouping: Great Western Railway

Key dates
- 6 August 1846: Opened as Aberdare
- 1 July 1924: Renamed
- 16 March 1964: Closed
Location

Aberdare Low Level railway station served the town of Aberdare in Wales. Opened by the Taff Vale Railway, it became part of the Great Western Railway during the Grouping of 1923. Passing to the Western Region of British Railways on nationalisation in 1948, it was then closed by the British Railways Board in 1964 when the passengers service from Abercynon was withdrawn as a result of the Beeching Axe.

== The site today ==
Aberdare is now served by Aberdare railway station, a new station opened on the site of the former high level station in 1988. The station here was demolished after the line through it closed in 1973; coal traffic from Tower Colliery at Hirwaun was then re-routed over a new connection onto the former Vale of Neath Railway line near Cwmbach to allow for the removal of the busy level crossing here. The station buildings subsequently burned down in 1982 and the site was redeveloped – it is now occupied by the town bus station.

== Sources ==
- Butt, R. V. J. (October 1995). The Directory of Railway Stations: details every public and private passenger station, halt, platform and stopping place, past and present (1st ed.). Sparkford: Patrick Stephens Ltd. ISBN 978-1-85260-508-7. OCLC 60251199. OL 11956311M.
- Jowett, A. (2000). Jowett's Nationalised Railway Atlas. Atlantic Publishing. ISBN 0-906899-99-0.

Preceding station	Disused railways	Following station
Aberaman	Great Western Railway; Taff Vale Railway	Commercial Street Platform
