= Listed buildings in Penarth =

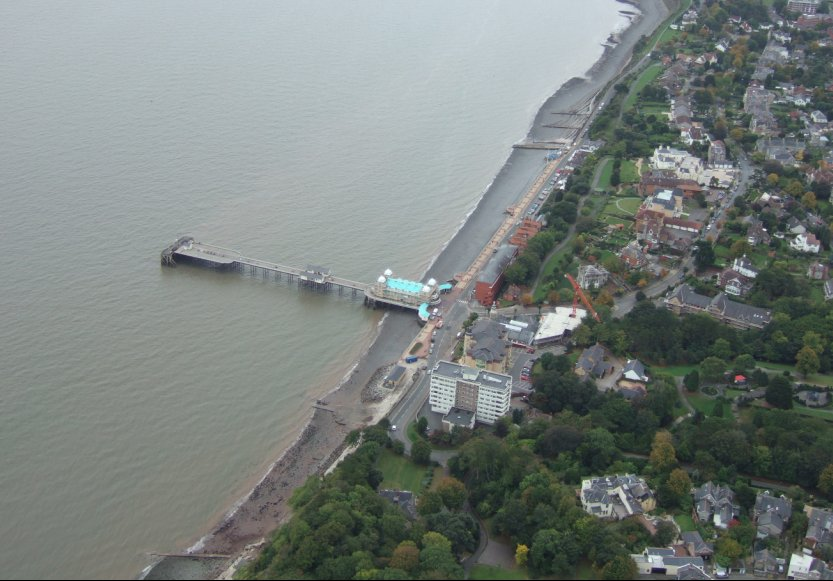
Aerial view of Penarth Pier and seafront

There are many listed buildings in Penarth, a seaside town in the Vale of Glamorgan, Wales. Penarth was popular with holidaymakers from far afield, but also a popular place to live for the wealthy business owners of Penarth and nearby Cardiff. The town has a wealth of Victorian and Edwardian architecture.

A listed building is one considered to be of special architectural, historical or cultural significance, and has restrictions on amendments or demolition. Buildings are listed as either Grade I, II* and II buildings lists, with the Grade I being the most important.

== Key ==
Grade	Criteria
Grade I	Buildings of exceptional, usually national, interest (generally the top 2%).
Grade II*	Particularly important buildings of more than special interest.
Grade II	Buildings of special interest, which warrant every effort being made to preserve them.

== Grade I and II* listed buildings ==
Name	Photograph	Grade	Date	Location	Description
St Augustine's Church, Church Place	St Augustine's Church	I	1866	Penarth Head; 51.4410°N 3.1679°W	Designed by architect William Butterfield and built between 1865 and 1866, replacing a ruined medieval church which was no longer large enough for the growing parish.
St Peter's Church, off Sully Road	St Peter's Church	II*	1100s	Old Cogan; 51.4275°N 3.1958°W	12th-century church extended in the early 1500s and restored in 1888-1894 by architect William Frame.

== Grade II listed buildings ==
According to the British Listed Buildings website there are 44 buildings in Penarth listed as Grade II, in addition to a bridge, a cenotaph, a pillar box and five telephone boxes. These include:

Name	Photograph	Grade	Date	Location	Description
Albert Road Infants School, Albert Road	Albert Road School	II	1876	Penarth Head; 51.4410°N 3.1712°W	Later enlarged in the early 1900s by local architect John Coates Carter.
Baron's Court or Cogan Pill House	Baron's_Court	II	1500	Cogan; 51.4479°N 3.1884°W	Late 15th or early 16th-century hall house, originally known as Cogan Pill, with later 19th-century additions. Owned by the Herbert family of St Fagans Castle for many generations. It is the only medieval hall building in South Wales to still be open from floor to roof. Now a pub and restaurant.
Cenotaph, Alexandra Park	Cenotaph	II	1924	Penarth; 51.4359°N 3.1691°W	Designed by Sir W. Goscombe John and completed in 1924, the Cenotaph is located at the high point of Alexandra Park. It is made from white granite and has a bronze statue of Winged Victory on the east face. Commemorates those who died in the two world wars.
Coastguard Cottage, Marine Parade	Coastguard Cottage	II	1840	Penarth; 51.4324°N 3.1697°W	Built c. 1840 by The Admiralty as accommodation for the local coastguard. It is well preserved with an original Georgian staircase and large cellars. The house is located high above the seafront with a view over the sea. It adjoins a row of terraced houses (1–5 Tower Hill Avenue) which were also built as coastguard accommodation and are similarly Grade II listed.
Custom House, Docks Road	Custom House	II	1865	Penarth Marina; 51.4446°N 3.1671°W	Located west of Marine Buildings at the entrance to the old Penarth Dock, a Renaissance style building completed c. 1865 probably designed by the dock designer Samuel Dobson.
Footbridge at Cogan railway station	Footbridge	II	1888	Cogan; 51.4461°N 3.1876°W	Late 19th century cast iron footbridge over a section of the railway to Barry which opened in December 1888. The bridge has Corinthian columns, ball finials to the balustrade and pierced quatrefoils in the stair risers.
Former Penarth Baths and Supervisor's Office, Beach Road	Penarth Baths	II	1885	Penarth (sea front); 51.4356°N 3.1681°W	Building on Beach Road, designed and built by H C Harris and H Snell, 1883-85. Inside it included a small pool and a large pool. A Supervisor's house is behind the building on the south west corner. The building was subsequently converted to a pub and restaurant in 1991.
Headlands School, Paget Place	Headlands School	II	1868	Penarth Head; 51.4424°N 3.1659°W	Originally the Penarth Hotel, built by Taff Vale Railway Company. Purchased after the First World War, becoming a nautical training school known as the J A Gibbs Home; later renamed The Headlands School. Four storey building in grey stone.
Marine Buildings, Docks Road	Marine Buildings	II	1865	Penarth Marina; 51.4446°N 3.1665°W	Next door to the Customs House at the entrance to Penarth Docks, built in a French Renaissance style c. 1865 probably designed by the dock designer Samuel Dobson. The building was used as a hotel and later offices until the early 1980s. There were plans in the 2010s to convert the derelict building into a hotel.
Penarth Pier and Pavilion, The Esplanade	Penarth Pier	II	1895 / 1929	Penarth (sea front); 51.4346°N 3.1650°W	Originally completed in 1895 but substantially altered since. The current Pavilion building was completed in 1929. Restoration efforts took place in 1994-98 and again in the 2010s. The Pavilion was re-roofed and refurbished to include a cinema, exhibition space and cafe, reopening in December 2013.
Penarth Public Library, Stanwell Road	Public Library	II	1906	Penarth (centre); 51.4370°N 3.1721°W	Designed by the architect of the Windsor estate, H. Snell, and paid for by a Carnegie Foundation grant.
Post Office building, Albert Road	Post Office	II	1936	Penarth (centre); 51.4394°N 3.1734°W	Designed by HM Office of Works architect, A R Myers, in an Art Deco style. Later used as a restaurant after the Post Office closed.
St Joseph's Church, Grove Terrace	St Joseph's	II	1915	Penarth (centre); 51.4387°N 3.1800°W	The main body of the church was completed by 1915, though the church was not fully built until after World War I. Designed by London architect, F. A. Walters, in an Italian Romanesque style.
Trinity Methodist Church, Stanwell Road	Trinity Methodist Church	II	1901	Penarth; 51.4362°N 3.1770°W	In a Perpendicular style, by Cardiff architect Harry Budgen.
Turner House Gallery, Plymouth Road	Turner House Gallery	II	1888	Penarth (centre); 51.4353°N 3.1725°W	Designed by Cardiff architect Edwin Seward to display a collection of J. M. W. Turner paintings.
Windsor Arcade Building, Windsor Terrace	Windsor Arcade	II	1898	Penarth (centre); 51.4386°N 3.1726°W	Adjoining the Grade II listed Lloyds Bank in the town centre, the neo-Classical building was designed by Edward Webb and dates to 1898. The shopping arcade is described as "Penarth's most significant C19 commercial building".
Yacht Club House, Esplanade	Yacht Club	II	1884-95	Penarth (sea front); 51.4324°N 3.1676°W	North section built c. 1884 and south section added in 1895. Built as a clubhouse for Penarth Boat Club.

== See also ==
- Listed buildings in the Vale of Glamorgan
- Grade I listed buildings in the Vale of Glamorgan
- Grade II* listed buildings in the Vale of Glamorgan

== Sources ==
- Penarth, Vale of Glamorgan, BritishListedBuildings.co.uk
- Royal Commission on the Ancient and Historical Monuments of Wales (RCAHMW) website listings
