= Gyfeillon Platform railway station =

Disused railway station in Pontypridd, Rhondda Cynon Taf

Gyfeillon Platform

General information
- Location: Pontypridd, Glamorganshire; Wales
- Coordinates: 51.6075°N 3.3603°W
- Grid reference: ST058907

Other information
- Status: Disused

History
- Original company: Taff Vale Railway
- Pre-grouping: Taff Vale Railway

Key dates
- 5 June 1905: Opened
- July 1918: Closed
Location

Gyfeillon Platform railway station, also known as Gyfeillon Halt railway station, co-served the town of Pontypridd, in the historical county of Glamorganshire, Wales, from 1905 to 1918 on the Taff Vale Railway.

== History ==
The station was opened on 5 June 1905 by the Taff Vale Railway. It closed in July 1918.

Preceding station	Disused railways	Following station
Hafod; Line and station closed	Taff Vale Railway	Pontypridd; Line closed, station open
