= Aberaman railway station =

Railway station in Aberaman, Wales

Coordinates: 51.70225°N 3.42543°W

Aberaman

General information
- Location: Aberaman, Rhondda Cynon Taf; Wales
- Platforms: 2

Other information
- Status: Disused

History
- Original company: Aberdare Railway
- Pre-grouping: Taff Vale Railway
- Post-grouping: Great Western Railway

Key dates
- 6 August 1846: First station opens
- June 1856: First station closes
- August 1889: Second station renamed from Treaman
- 16 March 1964: Second station closes
Location

Aberaman railway station was the name given to two railway stations on the Taff Vale Railway near Aberdare in the Welsh preserved county of Mid Glamorgan. The first station, opened by the Aberdare Railway, only lasted ten years and was closed under Taff Vale ownership. Then the name of the adjacent Treaman was changed to Aberaman.

== History ==
The second station was incorporated, as part of the Taff Vale Railway, into the Great Western Railway during the Grouping of 1923. The line then passed on to the Western Region of British Railways on nationalisation in 1948. The station was closed by the British Railways Board.

== Sources ==
- Butt, R. V. J. (October 1995). The Directory of Railway Stations: details every public and private passenger station, halt, platform and stopping place, past and present (1st ed.). Sparkford: Patrick Stephens Ltd. ISBN 978-1-85260-508-7. OCLC 60251199. OL 11956311M.
- Jowett, A. (2000). Jowett's Nationalised Railway Atlas. Atlantic Publishing. ISBN 0-906899-99-0.

| Preceding station | Disused railways | Following station |
|---|---|---|
| Cwmneol Halt | Aberdare Railway; Later Taff Vale Railway; First Station | Treaman |
| Cwmneol Halt | Great Western Railway; Taff Vale Railway; Second Station | Aberdare Low Level |
