= Matthewstown Halt railway station =

Disused railway station in Ynysboeth, Rhondda Cynon Taf

Matthewstown Halt

General information
- Location: Ynysboeth, Glamorgan; Wales
- Coordinates: 51.6621°N 3.348°W
- Grid reference: ST068967
- Platforms: 2

Other information
- Status: Disused

History
- Original company: Taff Vale Railway
- Pre-grouping: Taff Vale Railway
- Post-grouping: Great Western Railway

Key dates
- 1 October 1914: Opened as Matthewstown Platform
- 2 October 1922: Name changed to Matthewstown Halt
- 16 March 1964: Closed
Location

Matthewstown Halt railway station served the community of Ynysboeth, in the historical county of Glamorgan, Wales, from 1914 to 1964 on the Aberdare line.

== History ==
The station was opened as Matthewstown Platform on 1 October 1914 by the Taff Vale Railway. Its name was changed to Matthewstown Halt on 2 October 1922. It closed on 16 March 1964.

Preceding station	Historical railways	Following station
Penrhiwceiber; Line and station closed	Taff Vale Railway; Aberdare line	Pontycynon Halt; Line and station closed
