= Penarth Dock railway station =

Former railway station in Wales

Coordinates: 51.446013°N 3.187496°W

Penarth Dock
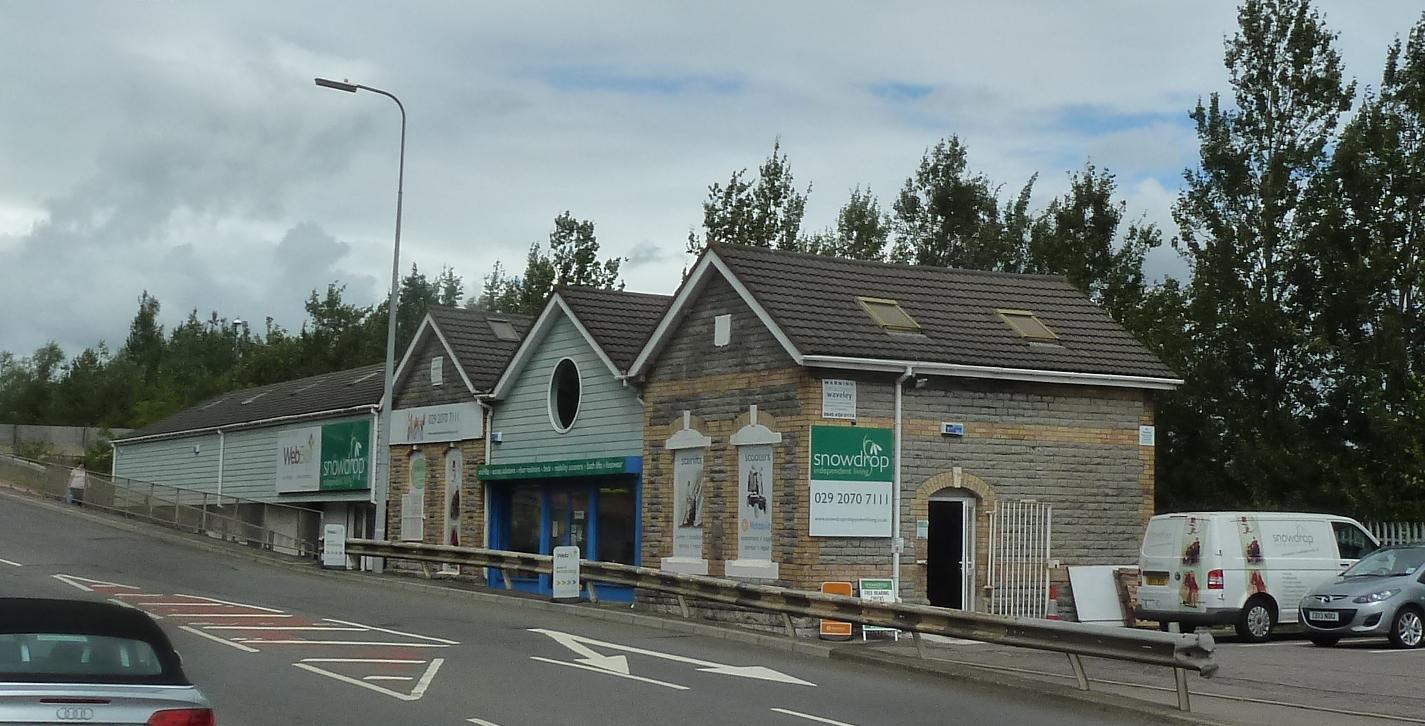
- Remaining buildings re-used for retail, 2014

General information
- Location: Penarth, Vale of Glamorgan; Wales
- Grid reference: ST176725
- Platforms: 2

Other information
- Status: Disused

History
- Original company: Taff Vale Railway
- Pre-grouping: Taff Vale Railway
- Post-grouping: Great Western Railway

Key dates
- 20 February 1878: opened as Penarth Dock and Harbour
- 28 January 1928: renamed Penarth Dock
- January 1962: closed
Location

Penarth Dock railway station served the docks area of Penarth.

== Description ==
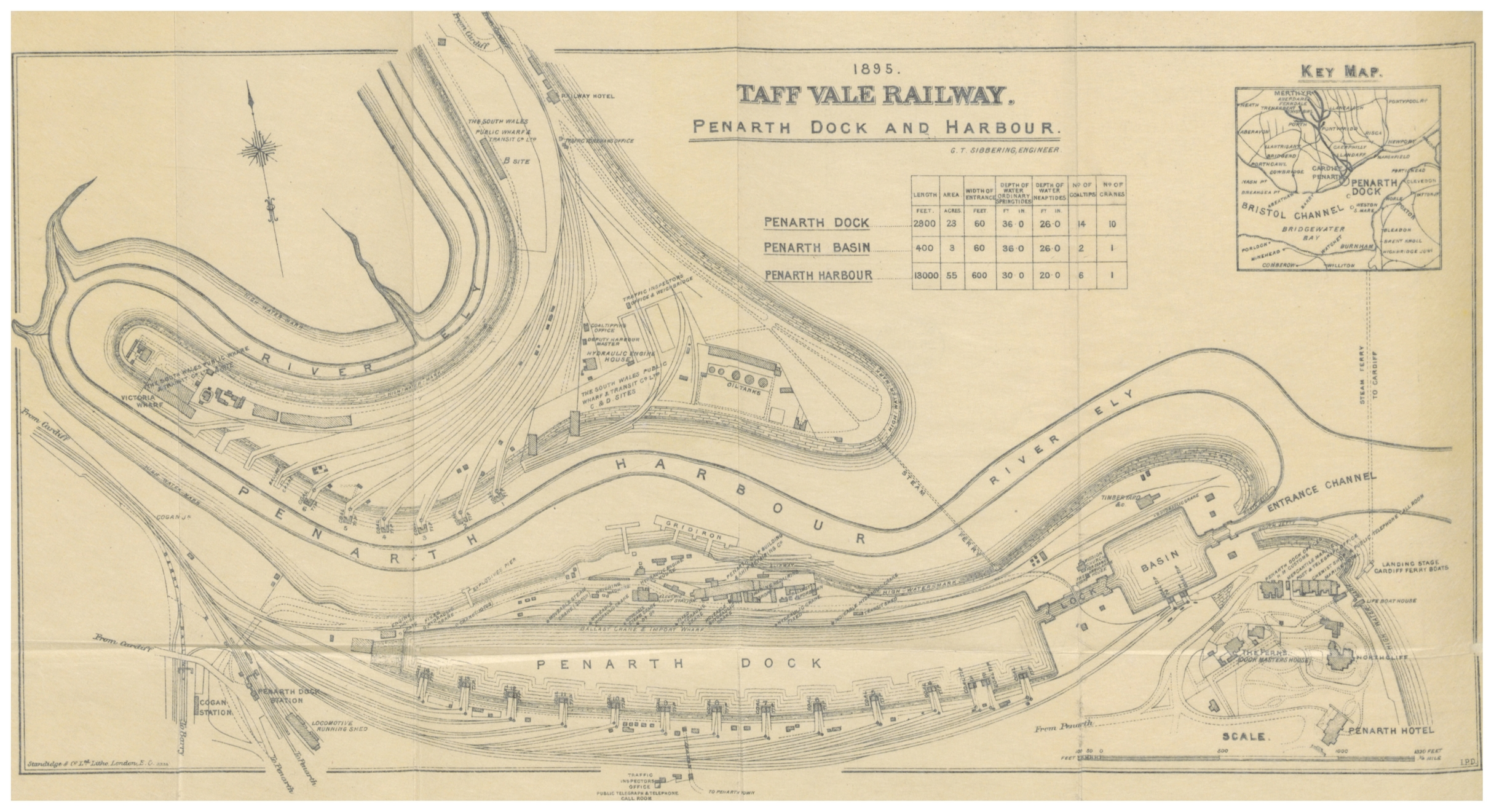
Map of Penarth Harbour in 1896, Penarth Dock station in lower left

The Taff Vale Railway built its line to Penarth in 1865, later extending it to Lavernock, Sully and Cadoxton. Penarth Dock and Harbour station opened in 1878. The name was changed to Penarth Dock in 1928. The station was staffed and had two platforms with substantial buildings, linked by a footbridge. Despite this, it was very quiet during the day, and received almost all its revenue from morning and evening rush hour trains. It was closed on Sundays.

== Closure ==
The station closed in January 1962. Most of the buildings are still present, and have been used by a range of businesses, including a shooting range, a garden centre, a second-hand car lot and a marine chandlers. The line is still open as far as Penarth, though it has been single track since 1967.

| Preceding station | Disused railways | Following station |
|---|---|---|
| Llandough Platform | Great Western Railway; Taff Vale | Dingle Road |

== See also ==
- Penarth railway station
