= Sully railway station =

Former railway station on the Taff Vale Railway in Wales

Sully

General information
- Location: Sully, Vale of Glamorgan; Wales
- Coordinates: 51.4086°N 3.2222°W
- Grid reference: ST152684
- Platforms: 2

Other information
- Status: Disused

History
- Original company: Taff Vale Railway
- Pre-grouping: Taff Vale Railway
- Post-grouping: Great Western Railway

Key dates
- 20 Dec. 1888: Station opens
- 7 Oct. 1963: Closed to goods
- 6 May 1968: Closed to passengers
Location

Sully railway station served the village of Sully in the Vale of Glamorgan until the 1960s.

== History and description ==
The station was opened by the Taff Vale Railway. In comparison with the lightly built stations elsewhere on the Cadoxton Branch, Sully was a substantial station, with two long platforms linked by a metal footbridge. Each platform has a building, a signal box and a large goods facility. The station was successful in its early years, used by large amounts of tourist traffic.

The Cadoxton branch fell on leaner times in the mid-20th century. Sully closed to goods in 1963. Its signal box was taken out of use in 1965 Passenger closure followed in 1968 when the line was truncated at Penarth .

No trace of the station survives. The site is now occupied by a telephone exchange.

| Preceding station | Disused railways | Following station |
|---|---|---|
| Cadoxton; Line closed, station open | Great Western Railway; Taff Vale | Swanbridge; Line and station closed |
