= Swanbridge railway station =

Former railway station on the Taff Vale Railway in Wales

Swanbridge

General information
- Location: Sully, Vale of Glamorgan; Wales
- Coordinates: 51.4052°N 3.2037°W
- Grid reference: ST166680
- Platforms: 2

Other information
- Status: Disused

History
- Original company: Taff Vale Railway
- Pre-grouping: Taff Vale Railway
- Post-grouping: Great Western Railway

Key dates
- 20 Dec. 1888: Station opens as Swanbridge
- Jan. 1906: Station renamed Swanbridge Platform
- C1921: Station renamed Swanbridge Halt
- 6 May 1968: Station closes
Location

Swanbridge railway station was located on the now disused railway line between Penarth and Cadoxton, which closed in the 1960s.

== History and description ==
Like the other stations on the branch, Swanbridge opened to cater to the large amounts of tourist traffic. It was downgraded to 'platform' status in 1906. It is referred to as Swanbridge Halt on a 1921 OS map.

By the postwar years, traffic on the line beyond Penarth was in sharp decline, and the DMU sets which served the line in its last years rarely picked up or delivered more than a few passengers a day at Swanbridge.

The platforms originally had shelters, though these were gone by the 1960s. There was also a wooden awning covering the walkway leading up to the platforms, which stayed in position long after the platform buildings had gone.

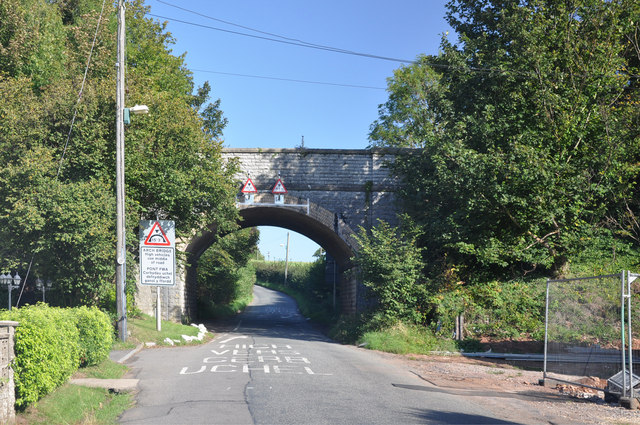
The disused railway bridge in 2009

The station closed in 1968. The site has mostly been reclaimed by nature. Only the old railway bridge remains.

| Preceding station | Disused railways | Following station |
|---|---|---|
| Sully | Great Western Railway; Taff Vale | Lavernock |
