= Taff Vale Railway =

Railway company and line in South Wales

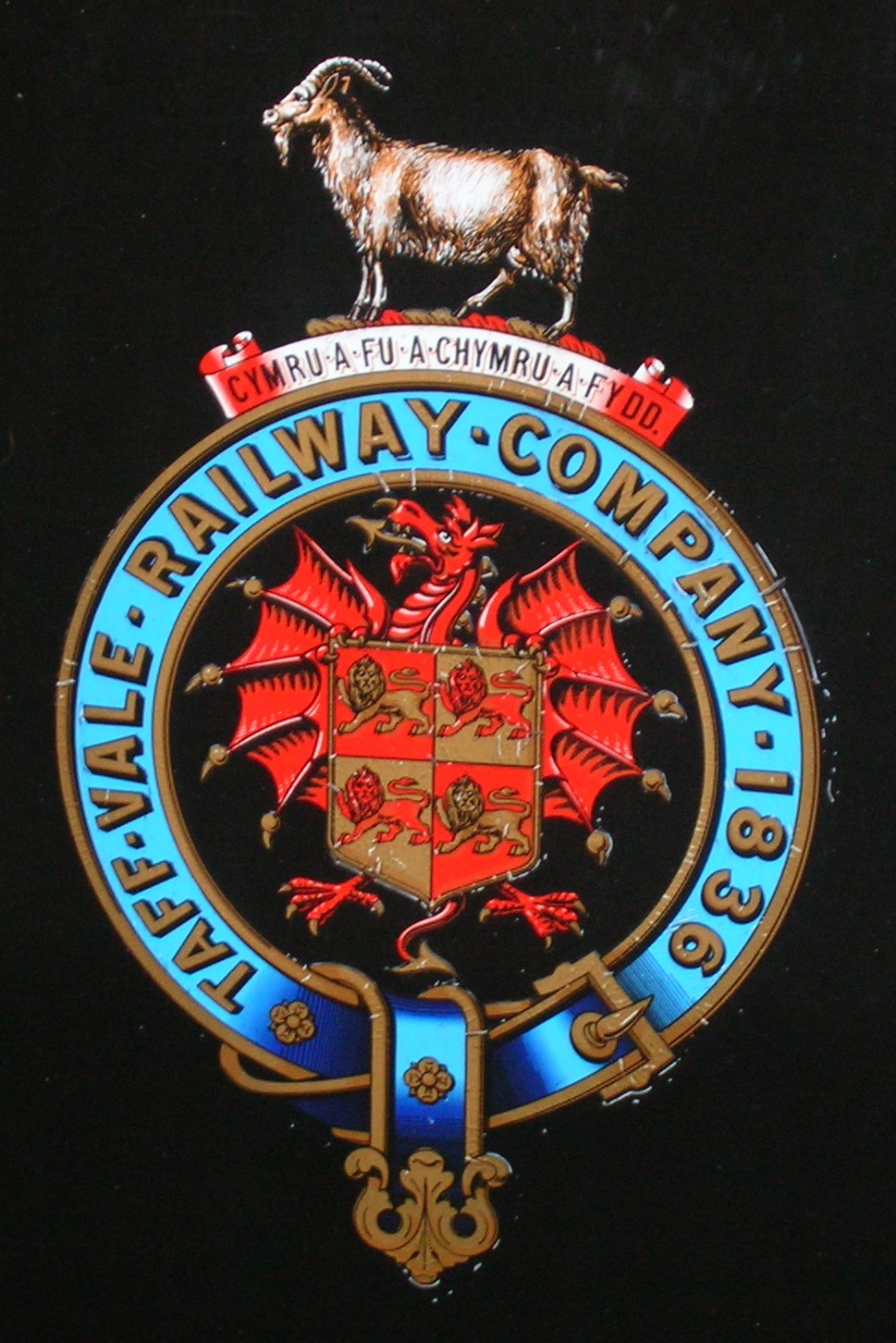

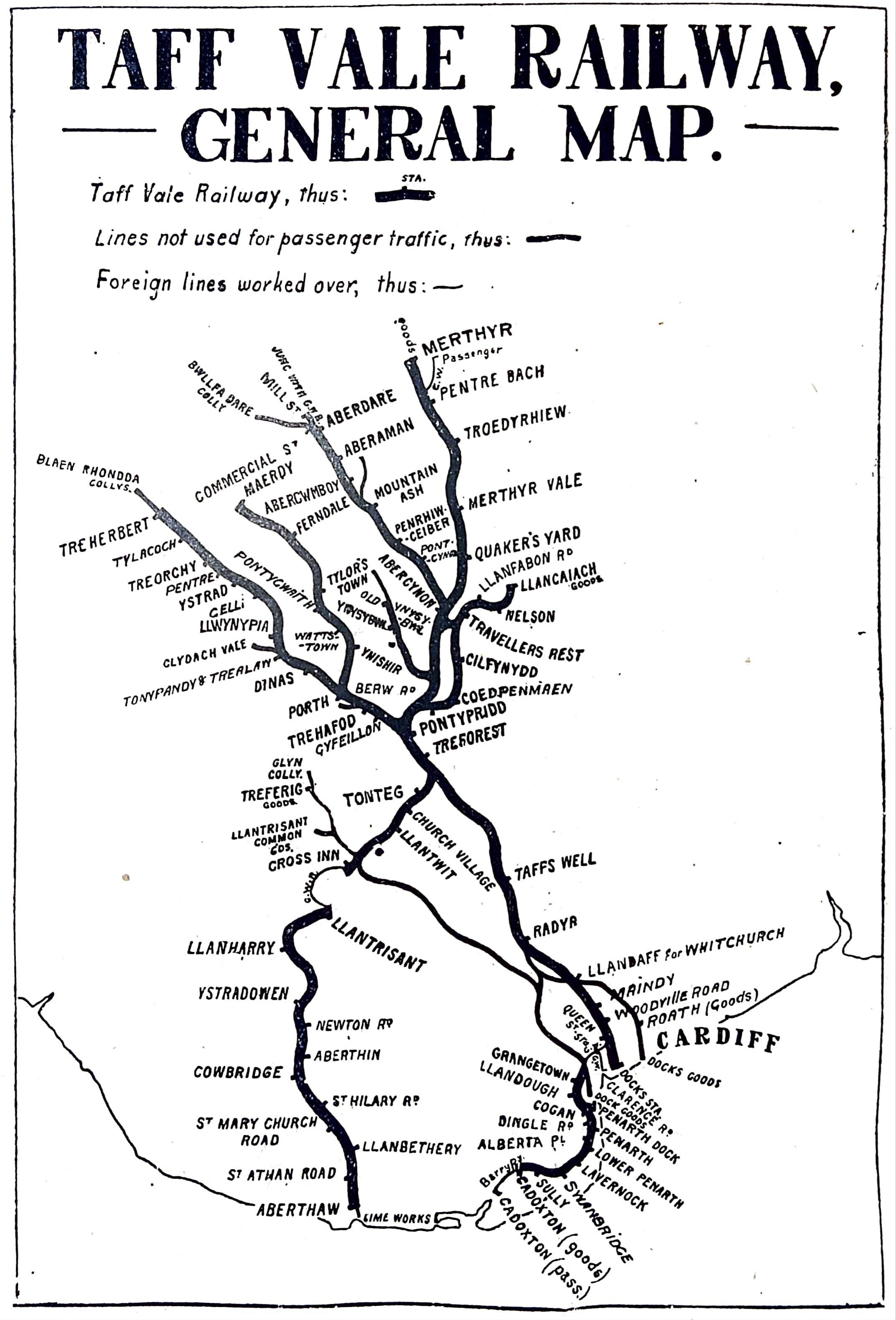

Overview
- Headquarters: Queen Street, Cardiff (Workshops: West Yard, Butetown, Cathays)
- Reporting mark: TV
- Locale: South Wales
- Dates of operation: 1840–1921
- Successor: Great Western Railway

Technical
- Track gauge: 1,435 mm (4 ft 8 1/2 in)
- Length: 124 miles 42 chains (200.4 km) (1919)
- Track length: 403 miles 41 1/2 chains (649.40 km) (1919)

Motto
Cymru a fu a Chymru fydd

(Wales hath been, and Wales shall be)

Milestones
12 October 1835	Resolution passed to form The Taff Vale Railway Company
21 June 1836	Act of Incorporation
16 September 1836	First company General Meeting, directors appointed
9 October 1840	Opened Cardiff to Navigation House (Abercynon)
12 April 1841	Opened Navigation House to Merthyr Tydfil
10 June 1865	Penarth Dock opened, TVR took out a 999-year lease
1900	Strike led to Taff Vale case (1901)
1903	"Motor cars" (steam railway passenger coaches) introduced
1 January 1922	Became constituent company of the GWR

Railways worked/leased
1847	Aberdare Railway
1862	Penarth Harbour & Dock Railway
1863	Llantrisant & TV Railway
1889	Cowbridge & Aberthaw Railway

The Taff Vale Railway (TVR) was a standard gauge railway in South Wales, built by the Taff Vale Railway Company to serve the iron and coal industries around Merthyr Tydfil and to connect them with docks in Cardiff. It was opened in stages in 1840 and 1841.

In the railway's first years, the coal mining industries expanded considerably and branches were soon opened in the Rhondda valleys and the Cynon Valley. The conveyance of coal for export and for transport away from South Wales began to dominate and the docks in Cardiff and the approach railway became extremely congested. Alternatives were sought and competing railway companies were encouraged to enter the trade.

In the following decades further branch lines were built and the TVR used "motor cars" (steam railway passenger coaches) from 1903 to encourage local passenger travel.

From 1922 the TVR was a constituent of the new Great Western Railway (GWR) at the grouping of the railways, imposing its own character on the larger organisation. The decline in the coal and iron industries took its toll on the mainstay of the network, but passenger trains still operate on most of the main line sections.

== Before the Taff Vale Railway ==
=== Minerals ===
Coal mining and iron smelting had been carried out on a small scale in South Wales down to the 18th century; it was encouraged by the plentiful availability of coal, at first at a shallow depth; timber (for pit props and for charcoal); and limestone (for fluxing). The coal was primarily used in iron production and it was only gradually that surplus coal began to be used for power (in industrial stationary steam engines) and for domestic use.

In time coke replaced charcoal in the smelting process. The availability of the raw materials at the heads of the South Wales valleys led to a number of ironworks being founded there between 1750 and 1800; these included the Cyfarthfa Ironworks, Plymouth Ironworks, and Dowlais Ironworks in the Merthyr Tydfil area.

A major difficulty was transport; conveying the finished product away to market was effected by coastal shipping, but the primitive road network made reaching the coast expensive and difficult; and the limestone, plentiful as it was, was located some distance north of the location of the ironworks.

In 1767, Anthony Bacon of Cyfarthfa persuaded his fellow ironmasters to join in a scheme to build a trunk roadway from Merthyr Tydfil to Cardiff. He used mule-hauled trains.

=== Tramroads ===
A solution to the difficulty of local transport around the area of the ironworks was the tramroad. Wooden railways had been extensively used elsewhere, but seem not to have been much used in South Wales. The local tramroads were almost all short-distance plateways (in which the rails are L-shaped plates, carrying wagons with plain wheels) and in many cases were simple extensions of plateways used underground in mines.

=== Canals ===
Canals were built down some of the valleys, to bring the iron down to the coast for shipping elsewhere. The Glamorganshire Canal was opened in 1794; it ran from Merthyr Tydfil to Cardiff, a distance of 25 miles (40 km). Local mine owners within 4 miles (6 km) of the canal were authorised to build tramroads to connect to the canal. About 350 miles (560 km) of tramroad were built in South Wales under this and similar arrangements before the coming of modern railways. 200,000 tons of coal were brought down by the canal in 1839 to the dock that became Bute West Dock.

=== The Penydarren engine ===
In 1802 the Merthyr Tramroad was opened, connecting the Dowlais and other ironworks with the Glamorganshire Canal. Richard Trevithick was employed at Penydarren Ironworks, served by the tramroad, and he built a steam locomotive engine. In 1804 a demonstration run took place in which 10 tons of iron and 70 people were transported 9 miles (14 km). This was the first use of a steam locomotive engine in the world. (Note: Trevithick had experimented with steam engines at Coalbrookdale in 1802.) However many of the cast-iron tramplates were broken due to the weight of the engine.

=== A railway proposed ===
For the first decades of the nineteenth century, the transport situation for Merthyr and the surrounding area changed relatively little; the Glamorganshire Canal prospered, but became overwhelmed by the volume of trade. Tramways continued with horse haulage and plateway tracks. Mule trains carried iron down the turnpike road.

Edge railways, evolved directly from earlier wooden railways, had continued in use in Northumberland and elsewhere in the country; the Stockton and Darlington Railway of 1825 and the Liverpool and Manchester Railway of 1830 demonstrated the capabilities of the current technology.

== Planning and construction ==
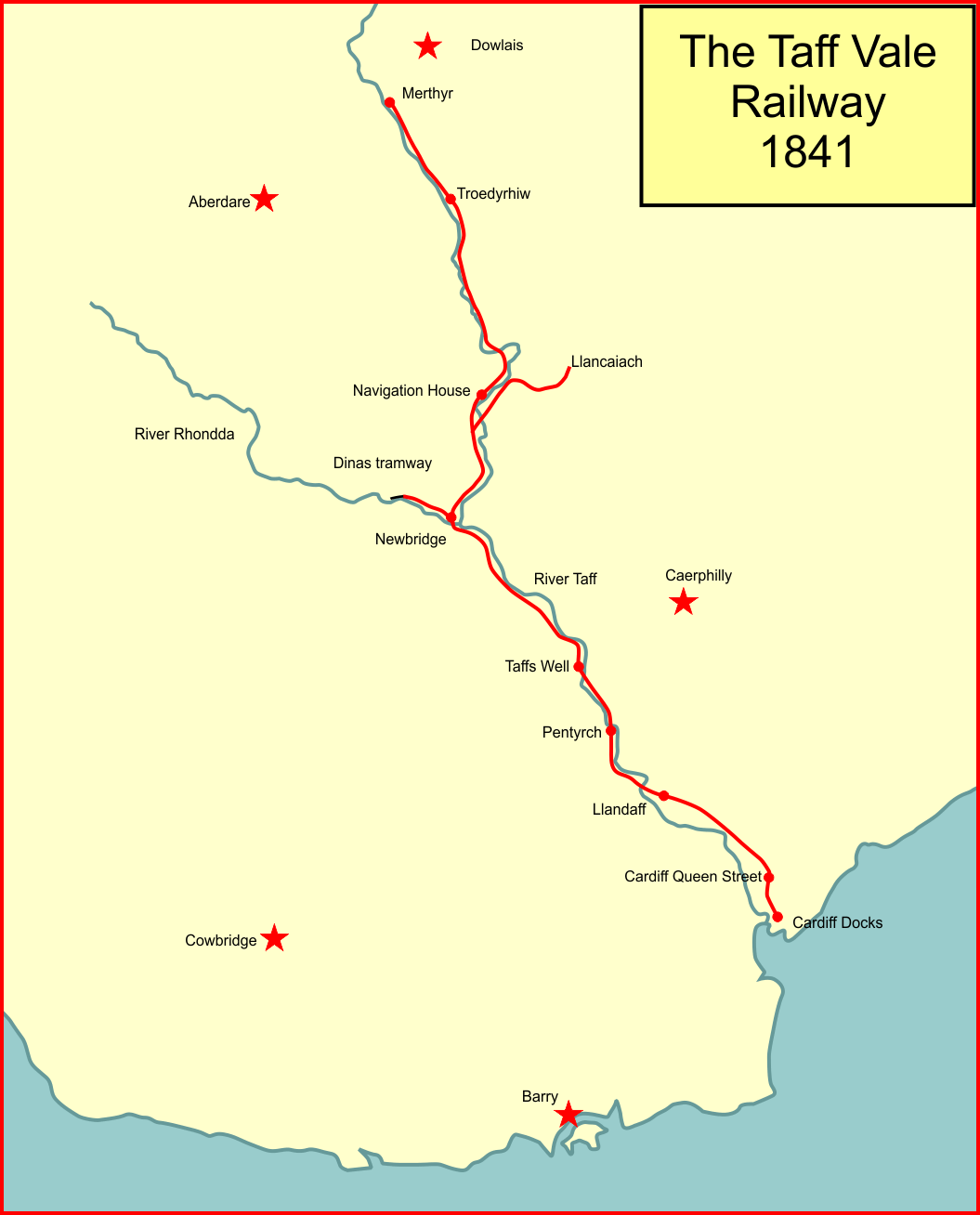
The Taff Vale Railway in 1841

Early in 1835, Anthony Hill, owner of the Plymouth Ironworks at Merthyr, asked the engineer Isambard Kingdom Brunel, a personal friend, to estimate the cost of building a railway from Merthyr to Bute Docks in Cardiff. Brunel's estimate was £190,649. However, by the following year Brunel had revised his estimate upwards, to £286,031, to accommodate improved gradients, mineral branches and shipping staithes.

In October 1835 a meeting of 'the Proprietors of Iron Works, Collieries, and others interested in the Minfral and other Property of the Vallies [sic] of the Taff, Rhondda, Cynon, Bargoed, and other adjacent places, and the Trade of the Town of Merthyr Tydvil and Port of Cardiff' was held at the Castle Inn in Merthyr Tydfil, chaired by John Josiah Guest, the MP for Merthyr. The meeting resolved to form "The Taff Vale Railway Company" and a provisional committee was appointed, consisting of J. J. Guest, W. Thompson, T. R. Guest, Richard Hill, Anthony Hill, William Forman, Walter Coffin, E. I. Hutchins, Edward Morgan, Robert Beaumont, Thomas Powell, W. Thomas, D. W. James, David Evans, George Insole, W. Jones, Henry Charles, and David Davis.

=== Act of Parliament ===
Taff Vale Railway Act 1836
- Act of Parliament
- Parliament of the United Kingdom
- Long title: An Act for making a Railway from Merthyr Tydfil to Cardiff, to be called "The Taff Vale Railway," with Branches.
- Citation: 6 & 7 Will. 4. c. lxxxii

Dates
- Royal assent: 21 June 1836

Text of statute as originally enacted

The promoters agreed to go forward with a parliamentary bill in the 1836 session. The Glamorganshire Canal Company opposed the bill, but it was passed and obtained royal assent on 21 June 1836 as the Taff Vale Railway Act 1836 (6 & 7 Will. 4. c. lxxxii). The Taff Vale Railway Company was incorporated with capital of £300,000. The directors were Josiah Guest (who became its first chairman), Walter Coffin, Edward Lee, Thomas Guest, Thomas Guppy, Thomas Powell, Christopher James, Thomas Carlisle, Henry Rudhall, William Wait, William Watson, and Peter Maze. However, at the company's first general meeting on 16 September 1836 the following were appointed as directors: J. J. Guest, Walter Coffin, T. R. Guest, Thomas Powell, T. Carlisle, E. H. Lee, Henry Rudhall, C. E. Bernard, Chris. James, W. K. Wait, Elijah Waring, and R. H. Webb.

Taff Vale Railway Act 1840
- Act of Parliament
- Parliament of the United Kingdom
- Long title: An Act to amend the Acts relating to the Taff Vale Railway.
- Citation: 3 & 4 Vict. c. cx

Dates
- Royal assent: 23 July 1840

Text of statute as originally enacted

The act authorised a railway from Merthyr Tydfil to Cardiff, to be known as the Taff Vale Railway, with several branches: to connect with the tramroad to Dowlais and other ironworks nearby; to collieries at Llancaiach; to the tramroad serving Dinas collieries (in the Rhondda); and to Cogan Pill. Company profits were limited to 7%; this could be augmented to 9% if the tolls for use of the line were substantially reduced. Independent carriers as well as the company itself were potentially able to use the line. The act also limited the speed of the trains on the line to 12 mph (19 km/h), with stiff penalties for any speeding. (These two clauses were repealed by the Taff Vale Railway Act 1840 (3 & 4 Vict. c. cx)) Locomotive operation and the carriage of passengers were permitted by the Taff Vale Railway Act 1836.

The Merthyr terminus was to be on an open space south of the town, between the River Taff and Cardiff Road. The Cardiff terminal was to be at or near the ship canal which the Marquis of Bute proposed to build. This became Bute West Dock; he had obtained powers to build it in 1830 but had held off from actually doing so.

Brunel, as the engineer for the line, designed it as a standard gauge line. He told the directors,

As regards the gauge or width of the rails, I see no reason in our case for deviating materially from the ordinary width of 4' 8 1/2″. The general gradients, the inclined planes, and still more the nature and the immediate extent of the peculiar class of traffic to which the line must always be devoted, not only render high speeds unnecessary, but must almost prevent their being attempted, while the same causes operate to diminish any advantage that may be gained in reducing friction by increased diameter of carriage wheels. (Note: Brunel originally chose the broad gauge for the Great Western Railway on the basis that large-diameter carriage wheels could be located outside the width of the body, as in stagecoaches. The larger-diameter wheels would give smoother running at high speed. In fact Brunel abandoned that idea when the rolling stock for the GWR was being produced.) The curves also which the nature of the ground render unavoidable would be unfit for a wider gauge…

=== Construction and opening of the first main line ===
The construction of the line posed no great engineering challenges as its course followed the valley of the River Taff. The line was 24 1/4 miles (39 km) in length. At Quakers Yard there was a sudden steep change of ground level and Brunel used 50-horsepower (37 kW) stationary winding engines; the inclined section was 1/2 mile (800 m) in length with gradients of 1 in 19 and 1 in 22. Locomotives did not ascend the incline. There was a 1 in 13 gradient on the Pwllyrhebog branch, near Tonypandy; it too was rope-worked with special locomotives. Inevitably there were some stiff gradients elsewhere. There were two stone viaducts on the route: the first, at Pontypridd, crosses the River Rhondda, and the second bridges the Taff valley between Goetre-coed and Quakers Yard.

As well as the avoiding the use of broad gauge, Brunel adopted a different form of track for the line: "parallel rails" weighing 55 pounds per yard (27 kg/m), fixed in chairs with compressed wooden keys. The chairs were fixed to transverse sleepers by screws inserted prior to laying, "ensuring accuracy of gauge".

A ceremonial opening of the line between Cardiff and Navigation House, Abercynon, took place on 8 October 1840, when the directors and shareholders travelled on the line; the full public opening of that section was on 9 October 1840. On 20 April 1841 the line was inspected by Sir Frederick Smith for the Board of Trade, and on 21 April 1841 the main line was opened throughout to Merthyr. (Note: Barrie says 12 April 1841; Barrie revised Baughan, and Chapman say 21 April, deferred from 12 April.) Passenger stations were at Cardiff, Llandaff, Pentyrch (later Radyr), Taffs Well, Newbridge (later Pontypridd), Navigation House, Troed-y-rhiw and Merthyr. There were two passenger trains each way daily, seven days a week. The line was single throughout with passing places at the stations. On double track sections and at crossing loops, right-hand running was employed for several years.

=== Early branches ===
A mineral branch from Pontypridd to Dinas Rhondda opened in June 1841.

The Llancaiach Branch was authorised in the original Taff Vale Railway Act 1836 (6 & 7 Will. 4. c. lxxxii). It opened on 25 November 1841 for mineral traffic only, from Stormstown south of Abercynon to three adjacent collieries at Llancaiach. There was a self-acting rope-worked incline 600 yards (550 m) long on a 1 in 8 gradient. Use of the line was less than expected, traders finding that the charges on the canal were substantially lower.

The TVR hesitated to build the authorised branch to the tramroad to Dowlais and the clause in the act enabled the Dowlais Iron Company to take over the construction and the branch, which they did.

== First years of operation ==
The line was open between Merthyr Tydfil and Cardiff, but almost immediately thought was given to improving the capacity of the main line and of serving the coal production of adjacent valleys.

=== Widenings ===
The line was originally single, except for the Quaker's Yard and Llancaiach inclines, which were double. Cardiff to Taffs Well was doubled in 1846 and through to Navigation House (Abercynon) in 1847. The doubling was completed to Merthyr in 1862.

=== Extending to Aberdare ===
The original purpose of the TVR had been deeply connected with the ironworks of Merthyr. In the years immediately following the railway's authorisation, the rich seams of high-quality coal in the Aberdare area came into prominence and began to outshine the Merthyr trade. Sixteen steam coalpits were sunk there between 1840 and 1853. Those collieries required transport to the sea and the proprietors of the TVR responded by sponsoring the Aberdare Railway, a nominally independent company.

Aberdare Railway Act 1845
- Act of Parliament
- Parliament of the United Kingdom
- Long title: An Act for making a Railway from the Taff Vale Railway near Ynys Meyrick to Aberdare, with a Branch therefrom, to be called "The Aberdare Railway."
- Citation: 8 & 9 Vict. c. clix
- Territorial extent: United Kingdom

Dates
- Royal assent: 31 July 1845
Other legislation
Relates to	Aberdare Canal Act 1793

Text of statute as originally enacted

Aberdare Railway Act 1848
- Act of Parliament
- Parliament of the United Kingdom
- Long title: An Act to authorize the leasing of the Aberdare Railway, with the Branch Railway and Works connected therewith, to the Taff Vale Railway Company.
- Citation: 11 & 12 Vict. c. xxiii

Dates
- Royal assent: 30 June 1848

Text of statute as originally enacted

The Aberdare Railway was incorporated by the Aberdare Railway Act 1845 (8 & 9 Vict. c. clix) on 31 July 1845 to make a 7 1/2-mile (12 km) branch from Navigation House to Aberdare. It was worked by the TVR from the outset and leased to it from 1 January 1847. It opened for passenger and goods and mineral traffic on 6 August 1846. Navigation House station was renamed Aberdare Junction on the opening of the branch. There was a 49-chain (3,200 ft; 990 m) branch off the Aberdare line from Cwmbach to Abernant colliery, also opened in 1846; it crossed the River Cynon to get access.

And be it enacted, That the said Railway shall commence by a Junction with the Taff Vale Railway at or near to a Place or Farm called Ynys Meyrick within the Parish of Llanwonno in the County of Glamorgan, and thence shall pass from, in, through, or into the several Parishes of Llanwonno aforesaid and Aberdare in the said County of Glamorgan, and shall terminate at or near to a certain Tramroad leading from Hirwain Iron Works to the Aberdare Canal on Gadlys Ucha Farm in the said Parish of Aberdare; and the said Branch shall commence from and out of the said intended Main Line of Railway at or near Aberaman Farm, in the said Parish of Aberdare, and shall terminate at or near Cwm Bach Colliery in the same Parish. — Section 17, Aberdare Railway Act 1845 (8 & 9 Vict. c. clix)

=== Left-hand running ===
In 1847 the Newport, Abergavenny and Hereford Railway obtained powers to build its Taff Vale Extension westwards from Pontypool to connect the TVR at Quakers Yard. This would be the first connection with the rest of the standard-gauge railway network; the TVR reviewed its policy of right-hand running and decided to change to left-hand running in preparation for the connection.

=== Taff Vale Extension Railway ===
The Newport, Abergavenny and Hereford Railway reached Quakers Yard on 11 January 1858, making a connection with the TVR there. This gave a route for minerals from the TVR network to reach much further afield, but reduced the haul length on the TVR system. The Taff Vale Extension Railway was later extended to Middle Duffryn, near Aberdare, opening in April 1864. (Note: The Newport, Abergavenny and Hereford Railway amalgamated with others to form the West Midland Railway in 1860, and that company amalgamated with the Great Western Railway in 1863.) The extension crossed the Llancaiach colliery sections of the TVR on the level and Llancaiach coal was transported via Quakers Yard on the TVER in preference to using the Llancaiach line inclined plane.

The coalfield around Aberdare was proving to have abundant resources of high-quality coal. The Taff Vale Extension line was able to take the output direct to London (via Hereford—the South Wales Main Line was still broad gauge at this time) and to the ports at Birkenhead and Southampton, where bunkering of seafaring ships was an important market.

=== Rhondda ===
The Rhondda valleys also began to be the source of excellent coal and that trade started to exceed that of Merthyr. The branch line from Pontypridd to the tramroad leading to the collieries called Dinas had been opened in 1841 which stimulated interest in mining in the valley.

Spurred by the threat of a possible broad-gauge line from Ely, the TVR obtained authorisation on 26 August 1846 for the Rhondda Fawr Valley Extension, in time reaching what is now Treherbert, opening to there on 7 August 1856. Passenger services were not started until 7 January 1863.

In 1849 the company offered a £500 premium for proving the existence of deep-seam coal in the Treherbert area. At the same time a 77-chain (1.5 km) extension from Porth to Ynyshir was opened for mineral traffic; that stub was extended to Ferndale in 1856 and later to Maerdy, which at 900 feet (270 m) above sea level was the most elevated location on the TVR system.

In 1854 the Eirw Branch was opened; under 1 mile (1.6 km) long it left the Rhondda line at Trehafod to serve nearby collieries.

In 1857 the TVR board authorised the doubling of the Rhondda Fawr as far as Porth; by February 1858 eight collieries were sending their coal down the extension of the Rhondda branch.

In the subsidiary Rhondda valley, the Rhondda Fach, the line was opened from Porth to Ferndale in the summer of 1876 and to Maerdy in 1889.

=== Pwllyrhebog ===
The Pwllyrhebog branch (as it became known) was authorised in 1857 to reach into Cwm Clydach from Tonypandy. Its actual construction was much delayed, a contract being let in December 1861; it was opened early in 1863.

It climbed away from the Rhondda very steeply, on a 1 in 13 gradient for 3/4 mile (1.2 km) and then on to Blaenclydach.

At first, the Pwllyrhebog incline was worked on the balanced load system but the TVR refused to install a stationary engine even though increasing volumes of output were putting a strain on the capacity of the system.

At this stage the Pwllyrhebog branch served two collieries, Cwm Clydach and Blaenclydach, but in 1871 Thomas, Riches & Co sank an important new pit further up the Clydach Valley at Clydach Vale. In November 1871 the TVR agreed to extend the Pwllyrhebog branch to the new pit; in fact the colliery company built the line and transferred it when completed to the TVR. The company also undertook to send all their traffic out via the TVR.

The new pit was at a much higher altitude even than the previous connections so a zigzag arrangement immediately above the Pwllyrhebog incline was necessary to gain further height. (Note: The zigzag was in front of Jones Street, Tonypandy, on the land now occupied by Glan-y-llyn.)

Taff Vale Railway Act 1899
- Act of Parliament
- Parliament of the United Kingdom
- Long title: An Act to enlarge the powers of the Taff Vale Railway Company with reference to the construction of works and the acquisition of lands and for other purposes.
- Citation: 62 & 63 Vict. c. cii

Dates
- Royal assent: 13 July 1899

Text of statute as originally enacted

The Taff Vale Railway Act 1899 (62 & 63 Vict. c. cii) 13 July 1899 formalised the ownership.

Writing in 1951, Casserley refers to a later time when a stationary engine had been installed:

The incline was worked on the counterbalance system, but there were two separate ropes for the ascending and descending trains, in contrast to the endless loop rope more commonly used in this situation.

The winding engine worked at a pressure of 25 psi (170 kPa) and the speed on the incline was about 5 mph (8 km/h). The TVR used three 0-6-0 tank engines specially designed for the incline, acquired from Kitson and Company in 1884. They had taper boilers to ensure that the firebox crown was covered when on the gradient; Casserley speculates that they probably were the first engines anywhere with taper boilers. The TVR gave them numbers 141 to 143; after 1922 they became GWR nos. 792 to 794. and were nos. 193 to 195 in British Railways days. Under the GWR a spare engine was kept as a standby; it was a standard pannier tank, no. 7722. Casserley does not explain how the firebox crown was kept covered in the case of this locomotive.

In 1889 the line was extended privately to Clydach Colliery, making a little over 2 miles (3.2 km) in all; the private extension was acquired by the TVR in 1896.

=== Blaenrhondda ===
Rhondda Valley and Hirwain Junction Railway Act 1867
- Act of Parliament
- Parliament of the United Kingdom
- Long title: An Act for making Railways in the County of Glamorgan to be called the Rhondda Valley and Hirwain Junction Railway; and for other Purposes.
- Citation: 30 & 31 Vict. c. clxxxviii

Dates
- Royal assent: 12 August 1867

Text of statute as originally enacted

In 1867 a bill was presented for a railway from Treherbert to Hirwaun. The Rhondda Valley and Hirwain Railway was authorised by an act of Parliament, the Rhondda Valley and Hirwain Junction Railway Act 1867 (30 & 31 Vict. c. clxxxviii), of 12 August 1867. It was nominally independent. It opened a short section from immediately northwest of Treherbert to Blaenrhondda, with a short spur to Blaencwm Colliery, in June 1878 for mineral traffic only. It abandoned its ambition to cross the 1,561-foot-altitude (476 m) pass to Hirwaun and leased its line to the TVR company from 1878. On 26 August 1889 it was absorbed by the TVR.

=== Widening the main line ===
Taff Vale Railway Act 1857
- Act of Parliament
- Parliament of the United Kingdom
- Long title: An Act for enabling the Taff Vale Railway Company lo construct new Lines of Railway, to alter, widen, and improve Portions of their existing Railway, and for other Purposes.
- Citation: 20 & 21 Vict. c. cliii

Dates
- Royal assent: 17 August 1857

Text of statute as originally enacted

The Taff Vale Railway Act 1857 (20 & 21 Vict. c. cliii) gave the TVR authority for a number of improvements over the coming years. The line was doubled throughout from 1858 to 1862 and later quadrupled between Pontypridd and Cardiff to accommodate the growth in traffic. New viaducts were built alongside the existing structures at Pontypridd and Quakers Yard to carry the second track. In 1864 work started on bypassing the incline with a gentler bank (but still steep at 1 in 40). This required significant earthworks and inclement weather meant that it was not completed until August 1867. Top of Incline station had already closed in 1858, replaced with a new station at Quakers Yard. Pontypridd station was greatly extended during the 1860s.

== Developing the system ==
=== Cardiff docks and Penarth ===
The Cogan Pill branch authorised in the original act was deferred, chiefly due to considerable opposition by the Marquis of Bute. Instead, the TVR company was coerced into accepting a long lease of Bute West Dock; in 1848 a branch, known as the East Branch, was opened to connect to it. The lease was expensive and not entirely convenient. The company was further put out when the rival Rhymney Railway was given access to the east side of the East Dock on considerably more favourable terms. This dock was commissioned in stages between 1855 and 1859 and the TVR was excluded from using it, except as a subtenant of the Rhymney. From 1866 the TVR was permitted access to the East Dock, but it had to run its line over the Rhymney's line from Crockherbtown Junction, just north of the present-day Queen Street station, to reach it, paying the Rhymney for the privilege. Moreover, congestion, for shipping and for railways, in the Bute Docks was becoming an increasing problem.

Ely Tidal Harbour and Railway (Glamorgan) Act 1856
- Act of Parliament
- Parliament of the United Kingdom
- Long title: An Act for making a Railway from the Taff Vale Railway to the River Ely in the County of Glamorgan, for converting Part of the said River into a tidal Harbour and regulating the Access thereto, for authorising Arrangements with the Taff Vale Railway Company; and for other Purposes.
- Citation: 19 & 20 Vict. c. cxxii

Dates
- Royal assent: 21 July 1856

Text of statute as originally enacted

Penarth Harbour, Dock and Railway Act 1857
- Act of Parliament
- Parliament of the United Kingdom
- Long title: An Act for enabling the Penarth Harbour, Dock, and Railway Company (heretofore called "The Ely Tidal Harbour and Railway Company") to construct Railways to and a Dock and other Works on or adjoining the South-west Bank of the River Ely, and for other Purposes.
- Citation: 20 & 21 Vict. c. lxix

Dates
- Royal assent: 27 July 1857

Text of statute as originally enacted

Penarth Harbour, Dock and Railway Act 1861
- Act of Parliament
- Parliament of the United Kingdom
- Long title: An Act to empower the Penarth Harbour, Dock, and Railway Company to raise a further Sum of Money; to make a Road between their Harbour and Cardiff; and for other Purposes.
- Citation: 24 & 25 Vict. c. cxxiv

Dates
- Royal assent: 11 July 1861

Penarth Harbour, Dock and Railway Act 1881
- Act of Parliament
- Parliament of the United Kingdom
- Long title: An Act to empower the Penarth Harbour Dock and Railway Company to extend their existing Dock and to execute other works in connexion therewith and to raise additional capital; and for other purposes.
- Citation: 44 & 45 Vict. c. li

Dates
- Royal assent: 3 June 1881

Text of statute as originally enacted

These dissatisfactions led to the company sponsoring the Ely Tidal Harbour and Railway, which was authorised by Parliament on 21 July 1856. The Ely Tidal Harbour and Railway (Glamorgan) Act 1856 (19 & 20 Vict. c. cxxii) enabled construction of a tidal harbour at Penarth, southwest of Cardiff, and an approach railway from Radyr on the TVR line. The route was modified by the Penarth Harbour, Dock and Railway Act 1857 (20 & 21 Vict. c. lxix) the following year, on 27 July 1857, and the name of the railway changed to the Penarth Harbour, Dock and Railway. The railway leading to Tidal Harbour, east of Cardiff, was just over 6 miles (10 km) long and opened in August 1859, but the dock was not completed until 1865. From 1862, one of the investors in the scheme was the naturalist Charles Darwin.

The Penarth scheme experienced determined hostility from the Bute Docks interest and there was protracted litigation over the validity of the powers. Although the final outcome was in favour of the TVR, the House of Lords' decision bound it to charge shipping rates no lower than the Cardiff rates. A major extension was later made, opening in 1884.

The opening of the Penarth Docks proved a huge benefit to the company, not only in bringing in direct revenue, but in easing congestion on the main line as mineral trains were diverted from Radyr. Enormous volumes were moved through the docks: 2.8 million tons in 1885. The Penarth Harbour, Dock and Railway was leased to the company, although its owning company retained its independent existence until 1922.

=== Llantrisant lines ===
In 1857 a competitive threat emerged when the Ely Valley Railway was incorporated to build a broad-gauge line from Llantrisant, on the South Wales Railway between Cardiff and Bridgend, towards the Rhondda valley. The line opened in August 1860 as far as Tonyrefail and in 1862 it was extended to Penygraig, close to the TVR at Tonypandy. It was leased to the GWR from 1 January 1861; the GWR wanted it as a source for locomotive coal and the lease was independent of the local broad gauge railway, the South Wales Railway.

The company saw this as a threat and promoted the nominally-independent Llantrissant and Taff Vale Junction Railway, which obtained its act of incorporation, the Llantrissant and Taff Vale Junction Railway Act 1861 (24 & 25 Vict. c. li) on 7 June 1861. It was to build from the TVR main line near Trefforest (Note: The junction there was known as "Llantrisant Junction".) to make a junction with the Ely Valley Railway at Maesaraul, near Llantrisant. The line opened in December 1863 for freight traffic. A passenger service was operated from Pontypridd to Llantrisant from 21 January 1875.

The nominally-independent Cowbridge Railway was authorised on 29 July 1862 to build from the Great Western Railway (former South Wales Railway) station at Llantrisant to Cowbridge. This was another TVR dependency as it failed to generate the necessary subscriptions to build the line itself. The line opened in February 1865. The GWR line was broad-gauge and the branch to Cowbridge was accessed from the Llantrisant and Taff Vale Junction Railway. Trains from Pontypridd ran over the final section of the Ely Valley Railway and across the South Wales Main Line to the Cowbridge Railway terminus where they had to reverse to continue.

=== Bypassing the Quakers Yard incline and opening Pontypridd north curve ===
The incline at Quakers Yard had become increasingly busy to the point of serious congestion and in 1864 the decision was taken to bypass it. A new route with a gradient of 1 in 40 was installed nearby and was commissioned in mid-1867. The TVR had running powers over the GWR's Taff Vale Extension line between Quakers Yard and Llancaiach. The mineral output from the mines there could now more conveniently be brought out via Quakers Yard, avoiding the incline on the Llancaiach branch, which was closed except for a short section at the north end. A north curve at Pontypridd was opened in October 1872, also facilitating the transfer of mineral output between the branches of the TVR system.

=== Dare Valley ===
Dare Valley Railway Act 1863
- Act of Parliament
- Parliament of the United Kingdom
- Long title: An Act for making a Railway from the Aberdare Railway in the Parish of Aberdare in the County of Glamorgan, with a Branch therefrom to be called "The Dare Valley Railway;" and for other Purposes.
- Citation: 26 & 27 Vict. c. clxxi

Dates
- Royal assent: 21 July 1863

Text of statute as originally enacted

There was intensive mining activity in the hills to the south of Aberdare and the Vale of Neath Railway had already opened a branch there. In 1866 the Dare Valley Railway, incorporated by the Dare Valley Railway Act 1863 (26 & 27 Vict. c. clxxi), was opened from Aberdare to the Bwllfa Colliery. (Note: Some authors spell this Bwlffa, but that is a mistake.) The line was worked by and leased to the TVR.

=== Reaching Dowlais ===
Iron production in South Wales peaked in 1871, after which the process was remorseless decline. An exception was at Dowlais, where the Bessemer process of steel making was instigated from 1865. This required a different quality of iron ore, not available locally, and the potential traffic flow of imported ore encouraged thoughts of improved railway connections. Several unsuccessful schemes were put forward, but a joint venture between the Rhymney Railway and the Great Western Railway (by now owner of the Taff Vale Extension line) resulted in the Taff Bargoed Joint Line. This opened on 10 January 1876 for goods and minerals from Taff Bargoed Junction, immediately west of Llancaiach station, to Dowlais. Passenger operation started on 1 February 1876.

The Taff Bargoed Joint Line had been authorised in 1867 and there were certain protections in its act for the company, including running powers over it. In 1872 the company presented a parliamentary bill to build on that, making a new railway to Llancaiach, with new connections to the Taff Vale Extension line. The intention was to run to Dowlais over the Llancaiach line and the Taff Bargoed line. The company already had access to Dowlais over the Dowlais Railway, but this route seemed more attractive, linking in the Navigation Colliery and possible traffic from the Taff Bargoed line itself.

In fact, the terms of the running powers did not permit through running at Llancaiach and the TVR company's intentions were frustrated when the GWR declined the facility, so the Llancaiach branch was not brought into full use.

== Later extensions to the system ==
=== Merthyr station ===
The TVR's original station in Merthyr Tydfil at Plymouth Street was opened on 12 April 1841 and was a short distance south of the town. This was joined in 1853 by the High Street station of the Vale of Neath Railway. A short joint line (TVR and GWR) was built to connect the TVR line to the new station in 1877. A year later, in August 1878, the TVR transferred all of its passenger services to the High Street station and used Plymouth Street as a goods depot instead. High Street station thus became the only passenger station in Merthyr and was used by a total of six separate companies prior to the 1922 grouping. The TVR also opened stations at Merthyr Vale in 1883 and Pentrebach in 1886.

=== Penarth Town ===
Penarth Extension Railway Act 1876
- Act of Parliament
- Parliament of the United Kingdom
- Long title: An Act to incorporate a Company for the construction of the Penarth Extension Railway; and for other purposes.
- Citation: 39 & 40 Vict. c. ccxii

Dates
- Royal assent: 11 August 1876

Text of statute as originally enacted

A short branch from the Penarth Dock line into the town was opened on 20 February 1878. Known as the Penarth Extension Railway, it was a mile long, running up a gradient of 1-in-40 from Cogan Junction to Penarth Town.

=== Treferig Valley Railway and the L&TVJR line ===
Treferig Valley Railway Act 1879
- Act of Parliament
- Parliament of the United Kingdom
- Long title: An Act for authorising the construction of railways in the county of Glamorgan to be called "The Treferig Valley Railway;" and for other purposes.
- Citation: 42 & 43 Vict. c. clxvi

Dates
- Royal assent: 21 July 1879

Text of statute as originally enacted

Seeking further expansion north of Llantrisant, the company encouraged the formation of the Treferig Valley Railway, incorporated on 21 July 1879 by the Treferig Valley Railway Act 1879 (42 & 43 Vict. c. clxvi). This opened a 2-mile-56-chain (4.3 km) branch from Treferig Junction, near Common Branch Junction on the Llantrisant and Taff Vale Junction line, to Treferig and Glyn Collieries in April 1883 for mineral trains only.

In 1865 the Ogmore Valley Railway was opened. It was a standard gauge line and there appeared to be enormous potential to bring standard gauge mineral trains to Penarth. The company obtained authority to build a northwest to southeast diagonal line across the Llantrisant and Taff Vale Junction Railway system to handle this traffic. Financial difficulties delayed construction and in the meantime the South Wales Main Line of the GWR was converted to standard gauge.

Now a mainline railway was available for the Ogmore Valley traffic via Bridgend and at a stroke most of the as yet unbuilt diagonal line was of little value. However, there were severe penalties in the legislation if it were not constructed, so the TVR used delaying tactics. However, it was eventually built, the section from Common Branch Junction to Waterhall Junction between Radyr and Penarth, giving direct access to the docks, opened in 1886 for goods and mineral traffic only.

=== Roath branch ===
The volume of mineral traffic exported through Penarth Docks had continued to grow and the capacity of the railway and the docks was overwhelmed. On 23 April 1888 the TVR opened a branch railway to the Roath Dock, itself opened in 1887, on the east side of the Cardiff complex of docks. The line diverged from the main line at Roath Branch Junction and arched round the east of the built-up area of the city of Cardiff as it was at that time, connecting with the Cardiff Railway's lines at the docks.

The Queen Alexandra Dock was opened in 1907 and was also served from the branch.

=== Ynysybwl branch ===
The company obtained powers to build a branch to collieries in the Clydach Valley in 1872, but then lost enthusiasm for the project when anticipated colliery development in the area did not materialise.

However, Lady Windsor Colliery near Ynysybwl was sunk in 1885 and promised to be a substantial activity. The TVR decided to build a branch line to serve it. The branch ran from a north-facing junction around 1 mile (1.6 km) south of Abercynon to collieries near Llanwonno, some way west of Ynysybwl itself. It was 4 miles 67 chains (7.8 km) in length and opened for goods and mineral traffic in 1886, though some informal use may have taken place in 1884. The passenger service as far as Ynysybwl started from Aberdare Junction station (known as Abercynon from 1896) on 1 January 1890.

In 1900 a south curve connection to the main line was opened but the TVR was concerned about congestion at Pontypridd and held off from starting the southward passenger service. After some delay, a railmotor passenger service connecting Pontypridd and Ynysybwl was started on 17 October 1904, the northward service to Abercynon being then discontinued.

=== Llancaiach ===
The original Llancaiach branch, opened in 1841, had left the Merthyr main line at Stormstown Junction, just south of Abercynon, crossed the River Taff and swung east to reach its objective. After a period of dormancy, in 1878 a deviation was built to avoid the rope-worked incline, but due to a dispute over running rights with the GWR the new line was little used.

Several decades later other collieries required to be connected on the east side of the Taff, in particular Albion Colliery (productive from 1887) and Cardiff Dowlais Colliery (productive from 1889). The decision was taken to make a branch from a junction further south at Pont Shon Norton at the northern margin of Pontypridd. This was opened in 1887 as far as Cilfynydd.

In 1900 the branch was extended northward to join the earlier Llancaiach branch, at Ynysdwr Junction, opening to traffic on 1 June 1900. A passenger service operated from Pontypridd to Nelson on the TVR line a little short of the junction with the Taff Vale Extension line and did not use the GWR Llancaiach station there. (Note: The GWR later opened a station named Nelson & Llancaiach replacing their Llancaiach station.) A railmotor service was inaugurated on 10 August 1904.

=== Cowbridge to Aberthaw ===
Taff Vale Railway Act 1894
- Act of Parliament
- Parliament of the United Kingdom
- Long title: An Act for empowering the Taff Vale Railway Company to construct a new Railway and other works and acquire lands for vesting in that Company the undertaking of the Cowbridge and Aberthaw Railway Company and for other purposes.
- Citation: 57 & 58 Vict. c. clxxii

Dates
- Royal assent: 17 August 1894

Text of statute as originally enacted

The Cowbridge and Aberthaw Railway was authorised by the Cowbridge and Aberthaw Railway Act 1889 (52 & 53 Vict. c. cxli) on 12 August 1889 to build from the end of the Cowbridge Railway to Aberthaw on the Bristol Channel coast, where there were important limestone quarries. The Cowbridge terminus was not aligned to permit the extension so a new Cowbridge passenger station was opened on the Aberthaw line, the old terminus reverting to goods status. The Aberthaw line opened on 1 October 1892. The little company was vested in the TVR company by the Taff Vale Railway Act 1894 (57 & 58 Vict. c. clxxii), effective from 1 January 1895. Later that year, the opening of the Vale of Glamorgan Railway connecting Aberthaw directly to Penarth and Cardiff took much of the potential mineral traffic away from this line.

=== Pontypridd improvements ===
Relief lines were constructed at Pontypridd in the 1890s, enabling goods trains to pass the station and wait for a clear path without interfering with passenger trains. Between 1907 and 1914 the station was rebuilt as a single long island platform with numerous bays. This work included raising the level of the entire station by nearly 5 feet (1.5 m). The new station had over 8,200 square yards (6,900 m^{2}) of platform. Passenger numbers starting or finishing a journey there exceeded 10,000 daily by 1920.

Congestion was also serious at Stormstown and layout enhancements were installed there in 1906. The opportunity was taken to shift Berw Road Platform from the site onto the Llancaiach branch.

== Competing railways ==
The TVR had been the first railway to serve the valleys of South Wales, at first chiefly to handle the iron products of Merthyr but soon to bring the coal output of the area served to the docks of Cardiff. As the coal production of the region grew so greatly it was inevitable that competing companies would enter.

=== Rhymney Railway ===
The Rhymney Railway was the main competitor to the TVR in bringing coal down from the valleys. For many years, until 1871, this involved Rhymney Railway coal trains running over the TVR main line from Walnut Tree to Cardiff. The line was extremely congested.

In 1867 the Rhymney Railway obtained running powers over the Taff Vale Extension line between Hengoed on the Rhymney system, through Aberdare to Hirwaun, giving it direct competitive access to the Aberdare coalfield.

=== Cardiff Dock congestion and Barry ===
The phenomenal increase in volume of coal shipped out of the various Cardiff docks had long been such that their capacity was overwhelmed. There were constant complaints that congestion on the railway and in the harbour resulted in unacceptable delays and costs. One outcome of the situation was the promotion and construction of docks at Barry, as well as the Barry Railway which ran direct from the Rhondda collieries to Barry. The Barry Railway was authorised in 1884 and Barry Docks opened on 18 July 1889.

Cardiff, Penarth and Cadoxton-juxta-Barry Junction Railway Act 1885
- Act of Parliament
- Parliament of the United Kingdom
- Long title: An Act to incorporate a Company for the Construction of Railways between Cardiff and Penarth and Cadoxton-juxta-Barry and other places; and for other purposes.
- Citation: 48 & 49 Vict. c. clxxv

Dates
- Royal assent: 6 August 1885

Taff Vale Railway (Amalgamation and Capital) Act 1889
- Act of Parliament
- Parliament of the United Kingdom
- Long title: An Act for amalgamating with the Undertaking of the Taff Vale Railway Company the Undertakings of other companies leased to or worked by them; and for consolidating and re-arranging the Capital of the said Company; and for other purposes.
- Citation: 52 & 53 Vict. c. cxciii

Dates
- Royal assent: 26 August 1889

Text of statute as originally enacted

The Barry Railway went on to promote a direct Cardiff, Penarth and Barry Junction Railway, which would run direct and also have a roundabout line following the coast. The TVR opposed this and promoted its own alternative lines. Parliament decided on a compromise in which the Barry Railway could build the direct line from a junction with the TVR and Cogan, while the TVR would build the coastal route from Penarth Town, joining the Barry Railway at Biglis Junction near Cadoxton. The TVR scheme was authorised by the Cardiff, Penarth and Cadoxton-juxta-Barry Junction Railway Act 1885 (48 & 49 Vict. c. clxxv) of 6 August 1885. The line was ready and opened on 1 December 1887 but the junction connection at Biglis was not made at first. For the sake of diplomacy it had to wait until the Cogan connection of the Barry line was ready. Both lines opened on 20 December 1888. TVR passenger trains ran through to the Biglis Junction station of the Barry Railway from August 1889. (The station was renamed Cadoxton on 1 June 1890). The Cardiff, Penarth and Barry Junction Railway became vested in the Taff Vale Railway Company by the Taff Vale Railway (Amalgamation and Capital) Act 1889 (52 & 53 Vict. c. cxciii) of 26 August 1889.

=== Pontypridd to Newport ===
The extensive and modern facilities at Newport Docks were serving the Monmouthshire valleys well enough, but there was a natural desire to handle some of the profitable business of the Glamorgan valleys too. The docks at Newport were operated by the Alexandra (Newport and South Wales) Docks and Railway, the railway part of their operation being confined to the docks area. They encouraged the formation of a nominally independent railway, the Pontypridd, Caerphilly and Newport Railway (PC&NR), authorised in 1878. The line ran from a junction immediately south of the TVR station at Pontypridd to near Caerphilly, relying on running powers from there over the Rhymney Railway and the Brecon and Merthyr Railway to reach Newport. The line was opened in July 1884. Seeing this as an opportunity, the TVR company worked the mineral trains for the PC&NR (until 1906).

=== Rhondda and Swansea Bay ===
Swansea docks also expanded its facilities and the new Prince of Wales Dock opened in 1881. During construction the owners saw that attracting coal shipments from the Rhondda valley could be beneficial. The result was the promotion of the Rhondda and Swansea Bay Railway which was to run from Treherbert at the head of the Rhondda Fawr, through a long tunnel to cross the watershed, and then down the valley of the River Afan. The construction of the tunnel took a long time and the line opened in 1890.

=== Cardiff Railway ===
The Bute Docks Company was created on 1 June 1887 and the Bute Docks properties were vested in the new company. In 1897 it succeeded in getting authorisation via the Cardiff Railway Act 1897 (60 & 61 Vict. c. ccvii) to build a railway, which became the Cardiff Railway, from Heath on the Rhymney Railway to Trefforest on the TVR, and a southward line from Heath to the docks at Roath. It took until 1911 to construct the line from Heath as far as a point close to the TVR line at Treforest, but the Company succeeded in fending off the incursion. The connection was never made and the Cardiff Railway never achieved its potential.

== Financial performance ==
In the period 1870 to 1888 the dividend on the ordinary shares averaged 12.5 per cent.

== The twentieth century ==
=== Steam railcars ===
The emphasis throughout the 19th century existence of the TVR had been on mineral traffic. When Ammon Beasley became General Manager in 1891 he sought to increase the passenger income of the company, particularly in the face of street-running passenger tramcars. In 1903 he introduced steam "motor cars" on the TVR. These were self-contained passenger coaches incorporating a small steam engine. The intention was to adopt a low-cost means of serving wayside communities by opening very basic stopping places (referred to as "platforms" rather than "stations") and having a more frequent timetable.

Consideration was given to whether the "platforms" could be at ground level, accessed by folding steps on the vehicle, but the decision was taken to make them elevated.

The first experimental run was on the Penarth branch on 21 December 1903.

The TVR used the system in both rural and suburban situations. It was commercially successful for some time, the TVR had nineteen steam railcars at the peak and offered first and third class accommodation. The railcars had the disadvantage of inflexibility at busy times and the small traction units became worn out after a decade and a half. At that stage the TVR converted the coaches to push-and-pull control trailers, using small independent locomotives as the power unit.

Taff Vale Railway Act 1903
- Act of Parliament
- Parliament of the United Kingdom
- Long title: An Act to empower the Taff Vale Railway Company to construct a new Railway and other Works and acquire Lands and for other purposes.
- Citation: 3 Edw. 7. c. clxxi

Dates
- Royal assent: 6 August 1897

Text of statute as originally enacted

As well as introducing steam railcars in 1903, the TVR obtained legal powers in the Taff Vale Railway Act 1903 (3 Edw. 7. c. clxxi) to install electric traction equipment. However, the powers were never used.

=== From 1922 ===
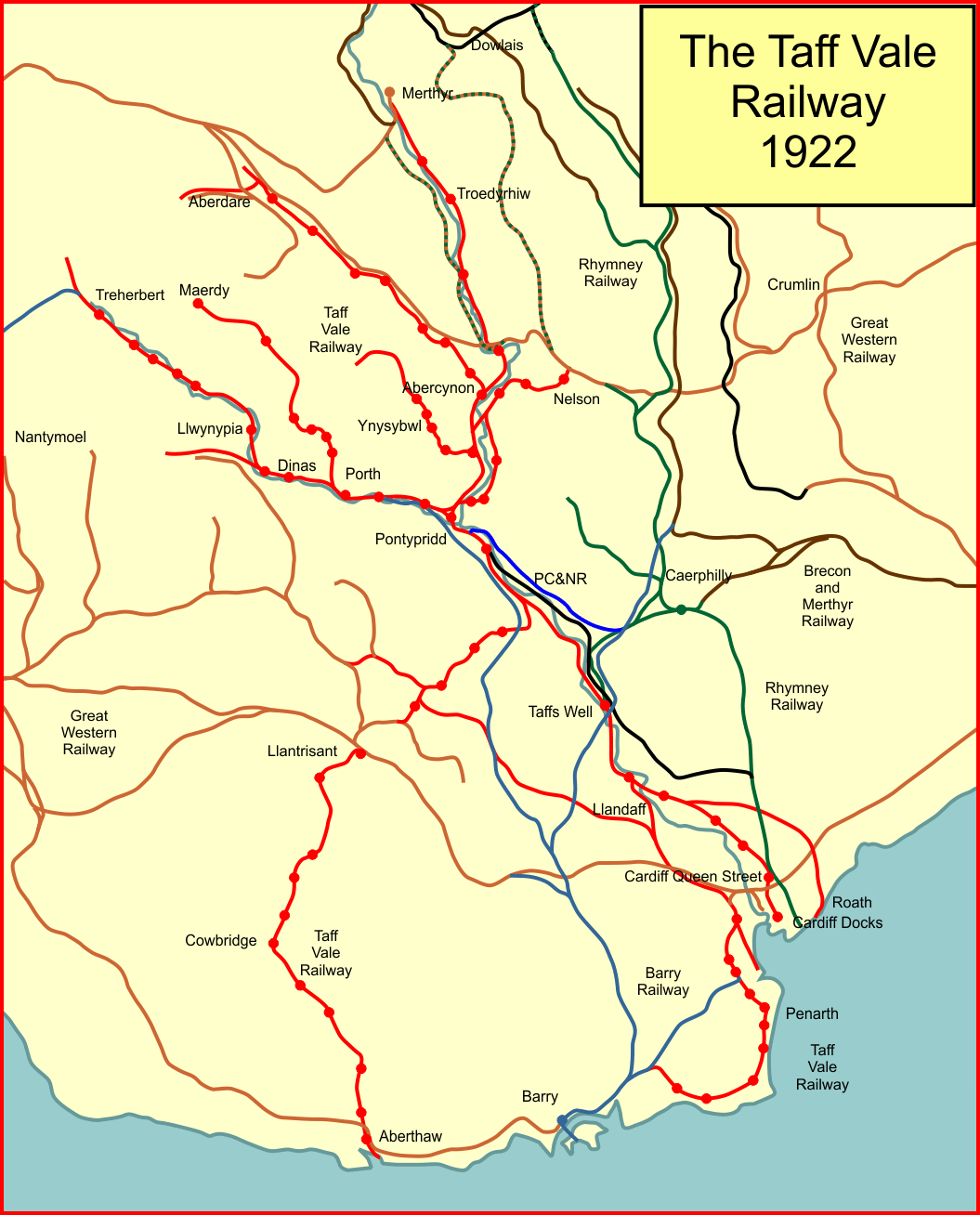
The Taff Vale Railway system in 1922

Following World War I the government decided to restructure most of the railways of Great Britain into one or other of four large companies. The process was called the "Grouping" and was legislated in the Railways Act 1921. The old Great Western and six of the South Wales railway companies were constituents of the new Great Western Railway. The other smaller railways in the GWR area were "subsidiaries", the old GWR being the largest and the TVR the second largest. The TVR was amalgamated into the putative GWR on 1 January 1922 (effectively from 25 March 1922).

Immediately prior to the amalgamation, the trading position of the TVR compared to the old GWR was:

	TVR	GWR
Issued capital	£6.42 million	£101 million
Net income in 1921	£464,654	£6,188,433
Annual dividend on ordinary stock in 1922	4%	7.25%
Route length	112 mi (180 km)	2,784 mi (4,480 km)
Number of employees	5,690	91,985

The Grouping meant that the competitive situation with the Rhymney Railway no longer existed and in July 1928 a new connection was installed at Cardiff Queen Street to enable the Rhymney trains to use Queen Street instead of the unsatisfactory Parade station adjacent.

The production of steel at Dowlais ceased in 1930. The inward haul of iron ore had sustained the Cilfynydd line and the GWR decided that the thinly patronised passenger service was unsustainable so it was taken off and the line closed completely above Cilfynydd from 12 September 1932.

== From 1948 ==
The mainline railways of Great Britain were taken into nationalised ownership at the beginning of 1948, following the Transport Act 1947. The former TVR area became part of the Western Region of British Railways. The end of World War II had brought to notice what had become inefficient working methods and British Railways immediately set about some closures.

The mineral line above Old Ynysybwl had never reached its potential and was closed completely on 22 September 1949; the passenger service was closed on 28 July 1952 and all ordinary traffic ceased in November 1959. Lady Windsor Colliery continued in business, served from the Stormstown direction, until closure of the colliery on 26 March 1988 and of the mineral trains after 20 May 1988. (Note: An enthusiasts' special train ran on 15 October 1988.)

The Pwllyrhebog branch was closed on 1 July 1951. The Pontypridd to Llantrisant passenger service ceased on 31 March 1952; the goods service closed in 1959. The Cowbridge line closed to passengers on 26 November 1951.

In June 1952 a new connection was made at Taffs Well to the colliery at Nantgarw, enabling closure of the Cardiff Railway connection beyond Coryton.

By the 1960s more passenger closures took place and the rationalisation of some over-provision of infrastructure was also implemented. The Aberdare branch was closed to passengers on 16 March 1964 and the line was singled in 1968. The Maerdy (Rhondda Fach) branch passenger service was withdrawn on 15 June 1964 and the branch was singled later that year. The Blaenrhondda branch was closed in 1966 and in June 1966 the Bute Road branch was singled. The Penarth branch was singled in February 1967 and the west-to-north curve at Pontypridd was closed on 5 August 1968.

The Roath branch was closed on 6 May 1968. In addition, the now-freight-only Cowbridge line closed completely in November 1965 (except for iron ore traffic to Llanharry) until 1975. The Penarth to Cadoxton line closed completely on 6 May 1968 together with the Roath Dock branch on the same day.

Closures in the mid-20th century left the TVR as the only railway route into Merthyr Tydfil. Plymouth Street goods station was closed in 1968. The line from Black Lion signal box (Merthyr Vale) to Merthyr Tydfil was singled in February 1971. As mineral traffic declined, the quadruple track south of Pontypridd became unnecessary and it was reduced to double line in 1980.

The Albion Colliery branch, served from Pont Shon Norton, closed completely in September 1970.

The Merthyr line from Abercynon was singled in 1971 and the Treherbert line above Cwmparc was singled in 1972.

On 10 August 1973 the extremity of the Aberdare branch was altered; approaching from Abercynon, the line crossed the River Cynon at Cwmbach along the alignment of the much earlier Cwmbach colliery spur and joined the former Taff Vale Extension and Vale of Neath line into Aberdare. The line from the point of divergence to Aberdare TVR station was closed.

The Eirw branch closed in 1977 when the last colliery finished operation. The Rhondda Fach branch also lost its freight service in 1987.

== The network today ==
The main routes of the TVR continue to be used for passenger trains under the management of Transport for Wales. Merthyr Tydfil, Aberdare, (Note: The Aberdare line uses the former TVR line as far as Cwmbach.) and Treherbert have train services to Cardiff Queen Street. The Cardiff Bay branch operates the majority of the former Cardiff Docks branch. The Penarth branch and the Radyr to Ninian Park line complete the surviving passenger routes.

== Accidents ==
On 19 October 1878 an empty passenger train was turning on the Pontypridd triangle. It was propelling on the wrong line from North Junction to Rhondda Cutting Junction and collided with a down Rhondda train. There were thirteen fatalities.

On 12 August 1893 the 3:50 pm train from Merthyr to Cardiff derailed at Trefforest, Llantrisant Junction. The train was conveying through coaches from Aberystwyth when a pin forming part of the suspension of the locomotive fractured and the locomotive collapsed and six passenger vehicles ran down the embankment and were smashed. Thirteen people were killed and twelve were injured.

On 23 January 1911 a passenger train ran into the rear of a coal train at Coke Ovens, near Pontypridd. The accident was due to irregularities in the block working by the signalman who forgot that he had admitted the first train into the section and had not received "Train Out of Section" for it. The block instruments were of the two-position type. Eleven people were killed and five were seriously injured.

In common with other railway companies of the time, operating the system was dangerous for staff. Between 1900 and 1923, the Railway Inspectorate investigated accidents to 75 employees, 12 of which were fatal.

== Topography ==
=== Main line ===
- Merthyr (Plymouth Street); opened 21 April 1841; closed 1 August 1877; passenger trains transferred to High Street station;
- Brandy Bridge Junction; convergence of line from Merthyr High Street;
- Pentrebach; opened 1 August 1886; renamed Pentre-Bach 1980;
- Troed-y-rhiw; opened by December 1841; still open;
- Merthyr Vale; opened 1 June 1883; still open;
- Quaker's Yard; opened 11 January 1858; renamed Quaker's Yard Low Level 1924; renamed Quaker's Yard 1968; now Quakers Yard; still open;
- Incline Top; opened 29 September 1841; closed December 1857;
- Navigation House; opened 9 October 1840; renamed Aberdare Junction 1849; renamed Abercynon 1896; renamed Abercynon South 1988; renamed Abercynon; still open
- Llancaiach Branch Junction / Stormstown Junction;
- Clydach Court Junction;
- Berw Road Platform; opened 17 October 1904; closed 1 July 1906;
- Pont Shon Norton Junction; convergence of Llancaiach branch;
- Pontypridd Northern Junction; divergence of Pontypridd Loop towards Porth;
- Newbridge Junction; opened 9 October 1840; renamed Pontypridd 1886; still open;
- PC&N Junction; divergence of Caerphilly line;
- Treforest; opened by December 1846; later renamed Trefforest; still open;
- Treforest Junction; divergence of line to Llantrisant, and of Cardiff Railway;
- Maesmawr; opened 30 October 1840; closed 20 April 1841;
- Treforest Estate; opened 5 January 1942; later renamed Trefforest Estate; still open;
- Taff's Well; opened 9 October 1840; alternatively known as Walnut Tree Bridge and Walnut Tree Junction; now Taffs Well; still open; convergence of Nantgarw branch; convergence of Walnut Tree Branch from Penrhos Junction;
- Radyr; opened 1 June 1883; still open; divergence of Radyr Branch (to Penarth);
- Llandaff Loop Junction; convergence of Llandaff Loop;
- Llandaff; opened 9 October 1840; renamed Llandaf; still open;
- Roath Branch Junction;
- Maindy North Road Platform; opened May 1907; renamed Maindy North Road Halt 1922; renamed Maindy Halt 1952; closed 15 September 1958;
- Cathays Woodville Road Platform; opened July 1906; renamed Cathays Woodville Road Halt 1922; renamed Woodville Road Halt; closed 15 September 1958;
- Cathays; opened 3 October 1983; still open;
- Crockherbtown Lower Junction; divergence of line to Cardiff East Dock;
- Queen Street North Junction; convergence of connection from Heath line;
- Cardiff; opened 9 October 1840; later known as Cardiff Queen Street; still open;
- Cardiff East Branch Junction; divergence of Cardiff East branch;
- Cardiff Bute Dock; opened after April 1841; renamed Cardiff Docks, then Cardiff Bute Road, more recently Cardiff Bay; still open.

=== Merthyr High Street ===
- Merthyr (Vale of Neath Railway station); opened 2 November 1853; TVR passenger services transferred in 1 August 1877; renamed Merthyr Tydfil 1980; still open;
- Mardy Junction; divergence of line to Vale of Neath Railway;
- Brandy Bridge Junction; above.

=== Aberdare line ===
- Mill Street Platform; opened 5 April 1847; closed 21 November 1852; reopened 26 November 1904; closed to public June 1912 but miners' use continued until 1940s;
- Dare Valley Junction; convergence of line from Nantmelyn;
- Commercial Street Platform; opened 26 November 1904; closed June 1912;
- Aberdare; opened 6 August 1846; renamed Aberdare Low Level 1924; closed 16 March 1964;
- Treaman; opened January 1857; renamed Aberaman 1888; closed 16 March 1964;
- Aberaman first station opened 5 April 1847; closed 14 July 1856; divergence of Aberaman Colliery branch;
- Convergence of line from Aberaman colliery; convergence of Cwmbach branch;
- Abercwmboi Platform; opened 26 December 1904; renamed Abercwmboi Halt 1922; closed 2 April 1956;
- Fernhill; opened 3 October 1988; still open;
- Mountain Ash; opened 6 August 1846; renamed Mountain Ash Oxford Street 1924; closed 16 March 1964; reopened as Mountain Ash 3 October 1988; still open;
- Penrhiwceiber; opened 1 |June 1883; renamed Penrhiwceiber Low Level 1924; closed 16 March 1964; reopened as Penrhiwceiber 3 October 1988; still open;
- Matthewstown Halt; opened 1 October 1910; closed 16 March 1964;
- Pontcynon Bridge Platform; opened 26 December 1904; later renamed Pontcynon Halt: closed 16 March 1964;
- Abercynon North; opened 3 October 1988; closed 2008;
- Abercynon; above.

=== Dare Valley Branch ===
- Bwllfa Colliery;
- Nantmelyn Platform; opened 1 July 1904 for miners only; closed 1 April 1949;
- Aberdare LL (above)

=== Rhondda Fawr ===
- Fernhill Colliery, Blaenrhondda;
- Fernhill Colliery; opened 1875 for miners; closure date uncertain;
- R&SB Junction; convergence of Rhondda & Swansea Bay line;
- Treherbert; opened 12 January 1863; still open;
- Tylacoch Halt; opened October 1906; closed November 1912; reopened as Ynyswen 29 September 1986; still open;
- Treorky; opened 27 September 1869; relocated by 30 chains 3 March 1884; renamed Treorchy 1892; still open;
- Pentre Platform; opened October 1906; closed November 1912;
- Ystrad; opened 4 February 1861; renamed Ton Pentre 29 September 1986; still open;
- Ystrad Rhondda; opened 29 September 1986; still open;
- Llwynypia; opened May 1871; still open;
- Tonypandy and Trealaw; opened 9 March 1908; renamed Tonypandy 1973; still open; convergence of Pwllyrhebog branch;
- Dinas Rhondda; opened 2 August 1886; closed 12 April 1917; reopened July 1919; now Dinas (Rhondda); still open
- Pandy (Glamorgan); opened 1 May 1861; closed 2 August 1886;
- Porth; opened 4 February 1861; still open;
- Hafod; opened 30 August 1861; closed 17 October 1892;
- Hafod; opened 17 October 1892 over 1 mile (2 km) down from previous station; renamed Trehafod 1905; still open; convergence or Airw Branch;
- Trehafod Junction; divergence of Barry Railway line;
- Gyfeillon Platform; opened 5 June 1905; closed July 1918;
- Rhondda Cutting; divergence of north curve towards Merthyr;
- Pontypridd; above.

=== Rhondda Fach ===
- Maerdy Colliery;
- Maerdy; opened 18 June 1889; closed 15 June 1964;
- Ferndale; opened 1868 as private station for workers of D Davis & Sons; closed 13 March 1875; opened to public 5 June 1876; closed 15 June 1964;
- Tylorstown; opened 24 May 1882; closed 15 June 1964;
- Pontygwaith Halt; opened 5 June 1905; closed 1 October 1914;
- Wattstown Platform; opened 5 June 1905; closed 12 July 1920;
- Ynyshir; opened by July 1885; closed 15 June 1964;
- Porth (above).

=== Roath branch ===
- Roath Branch Junction; above;
- Roath Goods;
- Roath Docks.

=== Radyr to Penarth Harbour ===
- Radyr; above;
- Quarry Junction; divergence of Llandaff Loop;
- Danescourt; opened 5 October 1987; still open;
- Waterhall Junction; convergence of Llantrisant No 1 Branch (L&TVJR from Common Branch Junction);
- Fairwater; opened 5 October 1987; still open;
- Waun-Gron Park; opened 2 November 1987; still open;
- Ninian Park Platform; opened by 1912; closed 3 September 1939; reopened although probably for football matches. Rebuilt and reopened for regular passenger service as Ninian Park 5 October 1987; still open; convergence of Leckwith Loop; divergence of line to Cardiff Central;
- Penarth South Junction; convergence of line from Cardiff Central;
- Grangetown; opened 29 May 1882; still open;
- Penarth Harbour Branch Junction; divergence of line to Penarth Town;
- Penarth Dock; opened 20 February 1878; closed 1 January 1962.

=== Penarth Branch ===
- Penarth Harbour Branch Junction;
- Llandough Platform; opened 13 June 1904; closed 3 June 1918;
- Penarth Dock Branch Junction; divergence of line to Penarth Dock;
- Cogan Junction; divergence of Barry Railway;
- Dingle Road; opened 1 March 1904; still open;
- Penarth Town; opened 20 February 1878; later Penarth; still open;
- Alberta Place Halt; opened 19 September 1904; closed 6 May 1968;
- Lower Penarth; opened 1 February 1897; renamed Lower Penarth Halt 1935; closed 14 June 1954;
- Lavernock; opened 1 December 1887; closed 6 May 1968;
- Swanbridge; opened by July 1906; closed 6 May 1968;
- Sully; opened 24 December 1888; closed 6 May 1968;
- Biglis Junction; convergence with Barry Railway.

== Locomotives ==
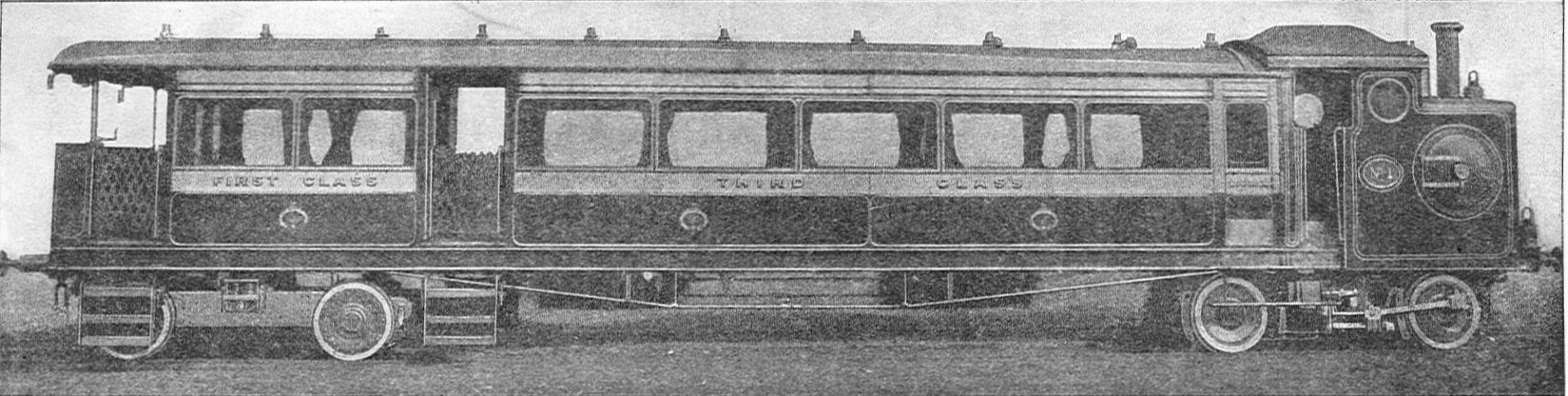
TVR steam railmotor

Prior to 1873 TVR locomotives were designed and built by outside contractors. The TVR locomotive engineers and superintendents were:

- George Bush (to September 1841)
- Edward Bage (1841 – December 1842)
- William Brunton (December 1842–?)
- Richard Gregory
- William Craig
- Alexander Colville (?–1846)
- Henry Clements (December 1846 – January 1858)
- Joseph Tomlinson (January 1858 – July 1869)
- B. S. Fisher (1869–1873)
- Tom Hurry Riches (1 October 1873 – 4 September 1911)
- John Cameron (1911–1922)

=== Locomotive classes ===
Two 2-2-2 locomotives were supplied by Sharp, Roberts and Co. for the opening of the first section of the TVR on 8 October 1840. As further sections were opened, and traffic increased, additional locomotives were obtained. Most were bought from various private locomotive manufacturers such as R. & W. Hawthorn & Co., Kitson, Thompson and Hewitson, and Stothert, Slaughter & Co but some were acquired secondhand. The TVR began building locomotives in its own workshops at Cardiff (West Yard) in 1856, but was never self-sufficient – many locomotives continued to be supplied by private builders, and the last Cardiff-built locomotive entered service in 1903. Until 1863, locomotives were named, but not numbered; in that year, the existing fleet were allotted the numbers 1–50 and as these were applied, the names were removed. The earliest locomotives all had tenders, tank locomotives first appeared in 1865 and the last tender locomotives were delivered in 1889; some of these remained in service until the 1920s.

The TVR possessed over 460 locomotives at one time or another. There were 275 in service at the start of 1922, when the TVR amalgamated with the GWR and other railways. 104 of these lasted long enough to be inherited by British Railways (BR) at the start of 1948.

Later locomotive classes of the Taff Vale Railway
Class	Wheels	Introduced	Quantity	Final TVR nos.	To GWR	First GWR nos.	To BR	Extinct	Notes	Ref
A	0-6-2T	1914	58	3, 7, 10–12, 20, 42/5, 52, 75, 80, 90/1, 120/2–5/7–130/2–6/8–140/4/9, 154/6–160/2/4/5, 400–416	58	335/7, 343–9, 351/2/6/7, 360–2/4–8, 370–391/3/4/7–9, 401–4/6/8, 438–441	58	1957	GWR nos. 401 up allotted 303–9, 312/6, 322 in 1946, renumbered 1947–50	
C	4-4-2T	1888	6	170–5	6	1301–6	—	1927		
D	0-6-0ST	1865	8	250/7, 260/8–272	2	797/8	—	1926	Six withdrawn 1906–19	
E	0-6-0ST (Note: Built as 0-6-0; rebuilt 1892)	1873	4	262–5	2	795/6	—	1927	Two withdrawn 1906	
F	0-6-0ST (Note: Built as 0-6-0; rebuilt 1885–86)	1871	4	85, 255/6, 277	—	—	—	1905		
G	0-6-0T	1873	4	90/1/9, 276	—	—	—	1901	Secondhand, built 1868	
H	0-6-0T	1884	3	141–3	3	792–4	3	1953	Renumbered 193–5 during 1948/49	
I	4-4-0T	1884	3	285–7	3	999, 1133, 1184	—	1925		
J	0-4-4T	1876	4	260/1, 277/8	—	—	—	1906	Rebuilt from 0-6-0 built c. 1861	
K & L	0-6-0	1874	85	201–3/6–213/7/9, 220, 235/6/9, 242/5/6/8/9, 252–6/8 (Note: The number 258 was borne by two different locomotives of Class L)/9, 261, 273–6/8/9, 281–4/8, 295/7/8, 301/2/4/5/8–316/8–325/7–330/2–340, 354/6–360	42	912–933/5/6/8/9, 941–4/6/8, 968–970/4/8, 984, 1000–2 (Note: TVR no. 333 was not allotted a GWR number)	—	1930	43 withdrawn 1907–20	
M & M1	0-6-2T	1885	41	4, 5, 14–16, 22/4, 50/1/3/4, 71/4, 86–89, 145–8, 150–3, 163/6–9, 176–181, 344/9, 362/4/5	41	442–5, 462/6, 478, 481–4/7–493, 503/5–8, 511/3/5/6, 520, 552, 560/7, 573/7–580/2–6	—	1934		
N	0-6-2T	1891	10	106/7, 182–9	10	485/6, 494–6, 498–502	—	1934		
O	0-6-2T	1894	6	21/5/6, 33/4, 190	6	446–8, 452/3, 581	—	1930		
O1	0-6-2T	1894	14	27–29, 37, 41, 60–65, 70/3/8	14	449–451/4/5, 471–7/9, 480	—	1931		
O2	0-6-2T	1899	9	31/2, 44, 66, 81–5	9	412/3/5/9, 421/3–6	—	1928		
O3	0-6-2T	1902	15	18/9, 47, 55/7, 92/3/6, 103, 117, 126, 131/7, 155, 161	15	410/1/6–8, 427–35/7	2	1948	Nos. 410/1 to BR	
O4	0-6-2T	1907	41	1, 2, 6, 8, 9, 13/7, 35/6/8/9, 43/6/8/9, 56/8/9, 67–9, 94/5/7/8, 101/2/4/5/8–116/8/9, 121	41	236, 278–302, 310/1/3–5/7–321/4, 333, 409, 414, 420	41	1955	Nos. 300 up allotted 200–211, 215–220 in 1946; except for 301/2, 314 these were renumbered in 1946–50.	
S & T	0-4-0ST	1876	2	266/7	2	1342/3	—	1926		
U & U1	0-6-2T	1895	15	23, 30, 40, 72/6/7/9, 191–198	15	587–593/5–600/2/3	—	1931		
V	0-6-0ST	1899	6	99, 100, 275, 280, 290/1	6	786–791	—	1930		
—	0-6-0	1866	4	69, 154, 254/7	—	—	—	1888		
—	2-4-0	1874	3	255/6, 269	—	—	—	1895		
—	0-6-0ST	1892	1	268	—	—	—	1899	Secondhand, built 1876	

In addition to these, sixteen steam railmotors were introduced from 1903. The engine portions were of the 0-2-2T wheel arrangement, and numbered 1–18 - two being spare. No. 1 was the last locomotive built by the TVR. They were extinct by the end of 1921, and so none passed to the GWR or BR.

=== Locomotive depots ===
The principal locomotive depot on the TVR was at Cardiff Cathays, which had a sub-shed at Roath Branch Junction. Other main depots were at Abercynon, Aberdare, Coke Ovens (near Pontypridd), Cowbridge, Ferndale, Merthyr, Penarth Dock, Radyr and Treherbert (which had a sub-shed at Pwllyrhebog). The steam railmotors were based at Coke Ovens, in a shed separate from the main depot. Several of these were closed by the GWR after Grouping: Merthyr and Roath Branch Junction closed in 1923; Cowbridge in 1924; Aberdare in 1927; Abercynon and Penarth Dock in 1929; Radyr and Treherbert in 1931; Coke Ovens in 1933. In the cases of Abercynon, Radyr and Treherbert, the TVR sheds were all replaced by new GWR sheds on nearby sites, and that at Abercynon also accommodated the locomotives from Coke Ovens when that closed in 1933. Only three TVR locomotive depots survived to be inherited by British Railways: Pwllyrhebog (closed July 1951); Ferndale (closed September 1964) and Cathays (closed November 1964); and of these, only Cathays was given a BR code in 1949 - 88A.

== Lawsuit against a trade union ==
In 1901 the Company successfully sued the Amalgamated Society of Railway Servants, a trade union, for damages due to losses accrued during a strike by their members who were seeking to compel the company to recognise the union. The company was awarded £23,000 by decision of the court, reversing the belief that trade unions were immune to damages from the actions of their members. Following the change of government in 1906, the Trade Disputes Act 1906 was passed, giving trade unions immunity from such claims.

== Preserved locomotives, rolling stock and paraphernalia ==
=== Carriages and wagons ===
A selection of original TVR rolling stock has survived into the present day.

TVR Coaches nos. 220, 153, 145, 52, and 31 are preserved at the Gwili Railway in west Wales in the care of the Gwili Vintage Carriage group. TVR coach no. 73 has also been restored to service on the Swindon and Cricklade Railway. Coaches nos. 277, 210, and 112 stand in a private residence. Coaches nos. 48, and 51 are now owned by the National Museums & Galleries of Wales. Coach 203 moved to the East Somerset Railway in 2026.

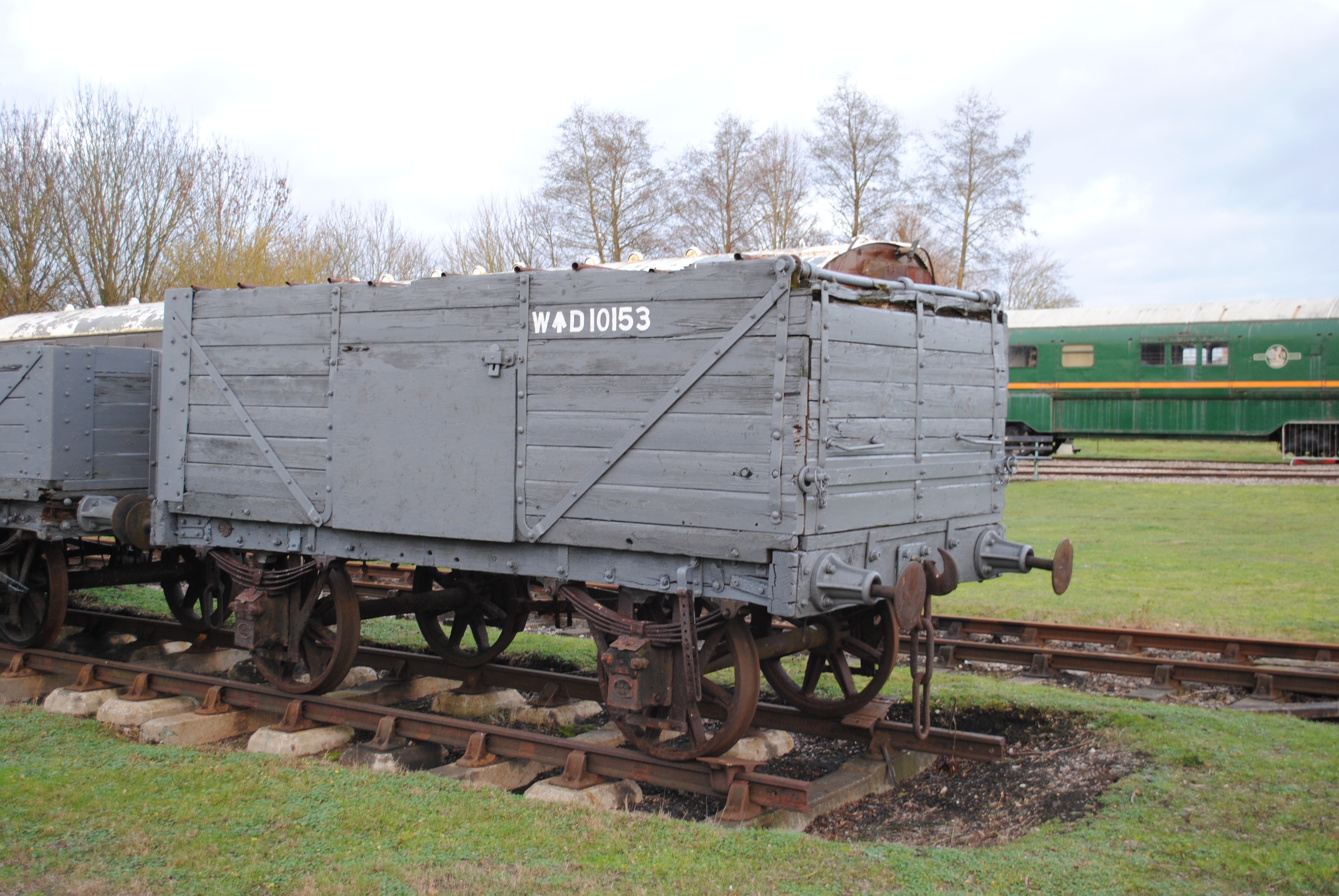
TVR four wheel 7-plank mineral wagon 10153

Only one mineral wagon is known to exist today, at the Didcot Railway Centre.

One six-wheel brake van body is also known to exist, in a private residence in Wiltshire.

=== Locomotives ===
Two locomotives are preserved.

Image	TVR No.	TVR Class	Type	Manufacturer	Serial No.	Date	Notes
	28	O1 class	0-6-2T	Cardiff West Yard Locomotive Works	306	1897	Stored at the Gwili Railway
	85	O2 class	0-6-2T	Neilson and Company	5408	1899	Operational at the Keighley & Worth Valley Railway

=== Paraphernalia ===
The Cynon Valley Museum, Aberdare, contains a small collection of items that belonged to the Taff Vale Railway Company. These include a railway lamp, milestone and signs for a level crossing and weak bridge.
