= Caerphilly railway works =

Former engineering facility in Wales

Coordinates: 51°34′17″N 3°12′14″W

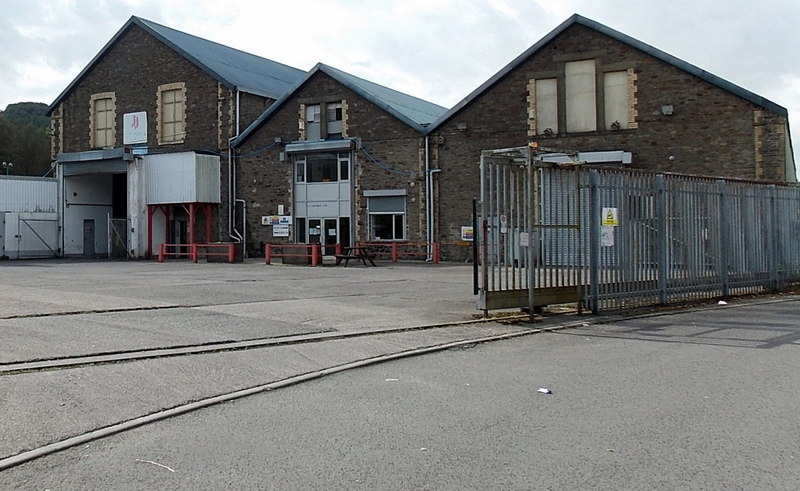
The former railway works buildings.

Caerphilly railway works in Caerphilly in the county of Glamorgan was the only main railway works in Wales.

It was built for the Rhymney Railway in 1899 and taken over by the Great Western Railway at amalgamation in 1923.

Much of its initial work was in refurbishing older locomotives with new boilers and covered cabs. In 1906, C.H. Riches who had been at Gorton locomotive works became Locomotive Superintendent and appointed J.H. Sellars as Works Foreman. Their policy was to modernise and standardise the locomotive stock, and Riches designed a standard boiler and cylinders for all the railway's tank engines.

He also designed a new class of 0-6-2 tank engine to be built by Robert Stephenson and Company who had provided six of their own design in 1903. In 1919 Sellars became the Works Manager. Until 1922 the works only repaired its own locomotives, but they began to be sent from the Barry Railway and in 1924 the first Swindon-built locomotive arrived. The works was enlarged with a new erecting shop in 1926.

The works also maintained a variety of wagons and passenger vehicles, building new mineral wagons and a few carriages, with a new workshop in 1901. However a new wagon works was built at Cardiff and, with work finishing its main work of converting Westinghouse air brakes to GWR vacuum brakes, the carriage and wagon works was phased out. However, in 1939 new workshops were built for carriage repairs only.

Until 1952 only tank engines had been repaired, but the efficiency of the works was such that they were asked to handle the smaller two-cylinder tender engines. They were so successful that larger engines were sent, the first being the 4-6-0 Number 5955 Garth Hall.

Around 1958 Swindon was committed to diesel locomotives and Caerphilly was sent Castle class and BR Standard locomotives.

With the withdrawal of steam on British Railways, the works closed in 1963 and the site converted into an industrial estate.
