= List of closed railway stations in Great Britain: P–R =

The list of closed railway stations in Great Britain includes the following: Year of closure is given if known. Stations reopened as heritage railways continue to be included in this list and some have been linked. Some stations have been reopened to passenger traffic. Some lines remain in use for freight and mineral traffic.

== P ==
=== Pa ===
Station (Town, unless in station name)	Rail company	Year closed	Notes
Padarn Halt	LMS	1939	
Padbury	L&NWR	1964	
Padeswood and Buckley	L&NWR	1958	
Padiham	L&YR	1957	
Padstow	L&SWR	1967	
Paisley Abercorn	G&SWR	1967	
Paisley Canal	G&SWR	1983	Reopened on different site 1990
Paisley Hamilton Street	G&SWR	1866	
Paisley West	G&SWR	1966	
Palace Gates	GER	1963	
Pallion	NER	1964	
Palnure	Portpatrick and Wigtownshire Railway	1951	
Palterton and Sutton	Midland Railway	1930	
Pampisford	GER	1967	
Pandy (Monmouthshire)	GWR	1958	
Pandy (Glamorgan)	Taff Vale Railway	1886	
Pans Lane Halt	GWR	1966	
Pant (Glamorgan)	Brecon and Merthyr Railway	1962	
Pant (Shropshire)	Cambrian Railways	1965	
Pant Glas	L&NWR	1957	
Pant Halt	GWR	1915	
Panteg	Pontypool, Caerleon and Newport Railway	1880	
Panteg and Griffithstown	GWR	1962	
Pantydwr	Cambrian Railways	1962	
Pantyffordd Halt	GWR	1962	
Pantysgallog (High Level) Halt	Brecon and Merthyr Railway	1960	
Pantysgallog (Low Level) Halt	L&NWR	1958	
Pantywaun Halt	GWR	1962	
Papcastle	Maryport and Carlisle Railway	1921	
Parcyrhun Halt	GWR	1955	
Parham	GER	1952	
Park (Grampian)	Great North of Scotland Railway	1966	
Park (Manchester)	Lancashire and Yorkshire Railway	1995	
Park Bridge	Oldham, Ashton and Guide Bridge Junction Railway	1959	
Park Drain	Great Northern and Great Eastern Joint Railway	1955	
Park Hall Halt	GWR	1966	
Park Lane Halt	Wigan Junction Railways	1964 (Passengers)	Date for freight closure unknown
Park Leaze Halt	British Railways	1964	
Park Royal	GWR	1937	
Park Royal & Twyford Abbey	District Railway	1931	
Park Royal West Halt	GWR	1947	
Parkend	Severn and Wye Railway	1929	Reopened 2005
Parkeston Quay West	London and North Eastern Railway	1960	
Parkgate 1st	Birkenhead Joint Railway	1886	
Parkgate 2nd	Birkenhead Joint Railway	1956	
Parkgate and Aldwarke	MS&LR	1951	
Parkgate and Rawmarsh	Midland Railway	1968	
Parkhead	Stockton and Darlington Railway	1862	
Parkhead North	North British Railway	1955	
Parkhead Stadium	Caledonian Railway	1964	
Parkhill	Great North of Scotland Railway	1950	
Parkhouse Halt	North British Railway	1969	
Parkside	Liverpool and Manchester Railway	1878	
Parkside Halt	LM&SR	1944	
Parracombe Halt	Lynton & Barnstaple Railway	1935	
Parsley Hay	L&NWR	1954	
Partick Central changed to "Kelvin Hall"	Lanarkshire and Dunbartonshire Railway	1964	
Partick West	Lanarkshire and Dunbartonshire Railway	1964	
Partickhill Originally known as "Partick"	North British Railway	1979	
Partington	Cheshire Lines Committee	1964	
Parton (Dumfries and Galloway)	Portpatrick Railway	1965	
Parton Halt (Cumbria)	London and North Western Railway and Furness Railway Joint	1929	
Partridge Green	London, Brighton and South Coast Railway	1966	
Paston and Knapton	Norfolk and Suffolk Joint Railway	1964	
Pateley Bridge	NER	1951	
Pateley Bridge (NVLR)	Nidd Valley Light Railway	1930	
Patna 1st	G&SWR	1897	
Patna 2nd	G&SWR	1964	
Patney and Chirton	GWR	1966	
Patrington	NER	1964	
Paulsgrove Halt	Southern Railway	1939	
Paulton Halt	GWR	1925	

=== Pe ===
Station (Town, unless in station name)	Rail company	Year closed	Notes
Peacock Cross	North British Railway	1917	
Peak Forest	Midland Railway	1967	
Peakirk	GNR	1961	
Peasley Cross	L&NWR	1951	
Pebworth Halt	GWR	1966	
Pedairffordd Halt	Cambrian Railways	1951	
Peebles(Old)	Peebles Railway	1864	
Peebles East	North British Railway	1962	
Peebles West	Caledonian Railway	1950	
Peel	Isle of Man Railway	1968	
Peel Road	Manx Northern Railway	1951	
Pellon	Halifax High Level Railway	1917	
Pelsall	L&NWR	1965	
Pelton	NER	1953	
Pembrey	Burry Port and Gwendraeth Valley Railway	1953	
Pembridge	GWR	1955	
Pen Cob Halt	Ffestiniog Railway	1967	
Penallt Halt	GWR	1959	
Penally	GWR	1964 reopened 1972	
Penar Junction Halt	GWR	1917	
Penarth Dock	Taff Vale Railway	1962	
Pencader	GWR	1965	
Pencader Junction	Manchester and Milford Railway	1880	
Pencaitland	North British Railway	1933	
Pencarreg Halt	GWR	1965	
Penclawdd	L&NWR	1931	
Pencoed	GWR	1964 reopened 1992	
Penda's Way	L&NER	1964	
Pendlebury	Lancashire and Yorkshire Railway	1960	
Pendleton	Lancashire and Yorkshire Railway	1994	
Pendleton Bridge	Lancashire and Yorkshire Railway	1966	
Pengam (Mon)	GWR	1962	
Penge	West End of London and Crystal Palace Railway	1860	
Penicuik	North British Railway	1951	
Penistone Barnsley Road	Lancashire and Yorkshire Railway	1916	
Penmaen Halt	GWR	1939	
Penmaenpool	Cambrian Railways	1965	
Penn Halt	GWR	1932	
Pennington	L&NWR	1954	
Penns	Midland Railway	1965	
Penpergwm	GWR	1958	
Penponds	West Cornwall Railway	1852	
Penpont Halt	Great Western Railway	1962	
Penrhiwceiber High Level	GWR	1964	
Penrhiwceiber Low Level	Taff Vale Railway	1964 reopened 1988	
Penruddock	Cockermouth, Keswick and Penrith Railway	1972	
Penscynor Halt	GWR	1962	
Pensford	GWR	1951	
Penshaw	NER	1964	
Pensnett Halt	GWR	1932	
Pentir Rhiw	Brecon and Merthyr Tydfil Junction Railway	1962	
Penton	North British Railway	1969	
Pentraeth	L&NWR	1930	
Pentre Broughton Halt	GWR	1931	
Pentre Platform	Taff Vale Railway	1912	
Pentrecourt Halt (or Platform)	GWR	1952	
Pentrefelin	Cambrian Railways	1951	
Pentrefelin Halt (Glamorgan)	GWR	1956	
Pentrepiod Halt (Gwynedd)	Bala Lake Railway	1965, reopened 1972	
Pentrepiod Halt (Monmouthshire)	GWR	1941	
Pentresaeson Halt	GWR	1931	
Pentwyn Halt	GWR	1941	
Pentwynmawr Platform	GWR	1964	
Pentyrch	Taff Vale Railway	1863	
Penwortham Cop Lane	Lancashire and Yorkshire Railway	1964	
Penybontfawr	Cambrian Railways	1951	
Penygraig	Great Western Railway	1958	
Penygroes	L&NWR	1964	
Penyrheol Halt	Rhymney Railway	1964	
Pen-y-Bryn Halt	Ffestiniog Railway	1957	
Pen-y-Mount	Welsh Highland Railway	1936 reopened 1980	
Peplow	GWR	1963	
Perivale Halt	GWR	1947	
Perranporth	GWR	1963	
Perranporth Beach Halt	GWR	1963	
Persley	Great North of Scotland Railway	1937	
Perth Princes Street	Caledonian Railway	1966	
Peterborough Crescent	Midland Railway	1866	
Peterborough East	GER	1966	
Peterchurch	Golden Valley Railway	1941	
Peterhead	Great North of Scotland Railway	1965	
Peterston	GWR	1964	
Petrockstow	Southern Railway	1965	
Petworth	London, Brighton and South Coast Railway	1955	

=== Ph ===
Station (Town, unless in station name)	Rail company	Year closed	Notes
Philorth Halt	GNSR	1965	
Philorth Bridge Halt	GNSR	1965	
Philpstoun	Edinburgh and Glasgow Railway	1951	

=== Pi ===
Station (Town, unless in station name)	Rail company	Year closed
Pickburn and Brodsworth	South Yorkshire Junction Railway	1903
Pickhill	NER	1959
Pickhill Halt	GWR	1962
Pickwick Halt	GWR	1962
Picton	NER	1960
Piddington	Midland Railway	1962
Piel	Furness Railway	1936
Pier Head	Liverpool Overhead Railway	1956
Piercebridge	NER	1964
Piershill	North British Railway	1964
Pill	GWR	1964
Pilling	Garstang and Knot-End Railway	1930
Pilmoor	NER	1958
Pilning Low Level	GWR	1964
Pilsley	Great Central Railway	1959
Pilton	Lynton and Barnstaple Railway	1904 passengers 1935 staff
Pimhole	Lancashire and Yorkshire Railway	1848
Pimlico	London, Brighton and South Coast Railway	1860
Pinchbeck	Great Northern and Great Eastern Joint Railway	1961
Pinchinthorpe	NER	1951
Pinewood Halt	GWR	1962
Pinged	Burry Port and Gwendraeth Valley Railway	1953
Pinkhill (Edinburgh)	North British Railway	1968
Pinmore	Glasgow and South Western Railway	1965
Pinwell (Lewes)	London, Brighton and South Coast Railway	1857
Pinwherry	Glasgow and South Western Railway	1965
Pinxton and Selston	Midland Railway	1947
Pinxton South	GNR	1963
Pipe Gate	North Staffordshire Railway	1956
Pirton	Birmingham and Gloucester Railway	1846
Pitcaple	Great North of Scotland Railway	1968
Pitcrocknie Siding	Caledonian Railway	1948
Pitfodels	Great North of Scotland Railway	1937
Pitlurg	Great North of Scotland Railway	1932
Pitmedden	Great North of Scotland Railway	1964
Pitsford and Brampton	LNWR	1950
Pittenweem	North British Railway	1965
Pittenzie Halt	British Railways	1964
Pittington	NER	1953
Pitt's Head	Welsh Highland Railway	1936
Pitts Hill	North Staffordshire Railway	1964

=== Pl ===
Station (Town, unless in station name)	Rail company	Year closed	Notes
Plaidy	Great North of Scotland Railway	1944	
Plains	North British Railway	1951	
Plank Lane	LNWR	1915	
Plantation Halt	Campbeltown and Machrihanish Light Railway	1932	
Plasmarl	GWR	1956	
Plas Power	GWR	1931	
Plas Power	Great Central Railway	1917	
Plashetts	North British Railway	1956	
Plas-y-Court Halt	Shrewsbury and Welshpool Railway	1960	
Plas-y-Nant	Welsh Highland Railway	1936 reopened 2005	
Platt Bridge	LNWR	1961	
Plawsworth	NER	1952	
Plealey Road	Shrewsbury and Welshpool Railway	1951	
Plean	Caledonian Railway	1956	
Pleasley East	GNR	1931	
Pleasley West	Midland Railway	1930	
Pleck	LNWR	1958	
Plenmeller Halt	North Eastern Railway	c. 1946	
Plessey	NER	1958	
Plex Moss Lane Halt	Lancashire and Yorkshire Railway	1938	
Plodder Lane	LNWR	1954	
Plowden	Bishop's Castle Railway	1935	
Plumpton (Cumbria)	LNWR	1948	
Plumtree	Midland Railway	1949	
Plym Bridge Platform	GWR	1962 reopened 2012	
Plymouth Friary	L&SWR	1958	
Plymouth Millbay	Great Western Railway	1941	
Plymouth Street (Merthyr Tydfil)	Taff Vale Railway	1877	
Plympton	GWR	1959	
Plymstock	LSWR	1951	

=== Po ===
Station (Town, unless in station name)	Rail company	Year closed	Notes
Pochin Pits Colliery Platform	LNWR	1922	
Pocklington	York and North Midland Railway	1965	
Point Pleasant	NER	1973	
Poison Cross	East Kent Light Railway	1928	
Polsham	Somerset and Dorset Joint Railway	1951	
Polton	North British Railway	1951	
Pomathorn Halt	North British Railway	1962	
Ponfeigh	Caledonian Railway	1964	
Ponkey Crossing Halt	GWR	1915	
Pont Croesor	Welsh Highland Railway	1936 reopened 2010	
Pont Lawrence Halt	LNWR	1957	
Pont Llanio	GWR	1965	
Pont Lliw	GWR	1924	
Pont Rug	LNWR	1930	
Pontardawe	Midland Railway	1950	
Pontcynon Halt	Taff Vale Railway	1964	
Pontdolgoch	Cambrian Railways	1965	
Pontefract Tanshelf	Lancashire and Yorkshire Railway	1967 reopened 1992	
Ponteland	NER	1929	
Pontesbury	Shrewsbury and Welshpool Railway	1951	
Pontfadog	Glyn Valley Tramway	1933	
Pontfaen	Glyn Valley Tramway	1933	
Ponthenry	Burry Port and Gwendraeth Valley Railway	1953	
Ponthir	GWR	1962	
Pontllanfraith High Level	LNWR	1960	
Pontllanfraith Low Level	GWR	1964	
Pontnewynydd	Great Western Railway	1962	
Pontrhydyfen	Rhondda and Swansea Bay Railway	1962	
Pontrhydyrun	GWR	1917	
Pontrhydyrun Halt	GWR	1962	
Pontrhythallt	LNWR	1930	
Pontrilas	GWR	1958	
Pontsarn Halt	Brecon and Merthyr Railway/LNWR	1961	
Pontsticill Junction	Brecon and Merthyr Railway	1962	
Pontwalby Halt	GWR	1964	
Pontyates	Burry Port and Gwendraeth Valley Railway	1953	
Pontyberem	Burry Port and Gwendraeth Valley Railway	1953	
Pontycymmer	GWR	1953	
Pontygwaith Halt (GWR)	GWR	1951	
Pontygwaith Halt (Taff Vale Railway)	Taff Vale Railway	1914	
Pontypool Blaendare Road Halt	Great Western Railway	1962	
Pontypool Clarence Street	GWR	1964	
Pontypool Crane Street	Great Western Railway	1962	
Pontypridd Graig	Barry Railway	1930	
Pontypridd Tram Road	Alexandra (Newport and South Wales) Docks and Railway	1922	
Pontyrhyl	GWR	1953	
Pool Quay	Cambrian Railways	1965	
Pool-in-Wharfedale	NER	1965	
Poplar	GER	1926	
Poplar (East India Road)	North London Railway	1944	
Port Carlisle	North British Railway	1932	
Port Carlisle Junction	North British Railway	1864	
Port Clarence	NER	1939	
Port Dinorwic	LNWR	1960	
Port Edgar	North British Railway	1890	
Port Isaac Road	London and South Western Railway	1966	
Port Meadow Halt	LNWR	1926	
Port of Menteith	North British Railway	1934	
Port Talbot Central	Port Talbot Railway	1933	
Port Talbot Docks	Rhondda and Swansea Bay Railway	1895	
Port Victoria	South Eastern and Chatham Railway	1951	
Portbury	GWR	1962	
Portbury Shipyard	GWR	1923	
Portesham	GWR	1952	
Portessie	Great North of Scotland Railway	1968	
Portessie	Highland Railway	1915	
Portgordon	Great North of Scotland Railway	1968	
Porthcawl	GWR	1916; 1963	
Porthywaen Halt	Cambrian Railways	1951	
Portishead	Weston, Clevedon and Portishead Railway	1940	
Portishead	GWR	1954; 1964	
Portishead South	Weston, Clevedon and Portishead Railway	1940	
Portknockie	Great North of Scotland Railway	1968	
Portland (Dorset)	Weymouth and Portland Railway	1952	
Portlethen	Caledonian Railway	1956 reopened 1985	
Portmadoc (New)	Welsh Highland Railway	1923; 1936	
Portobello (Wolverhampton)	LNWR	1873	
Portobello (E&DR-Edinburgh)	Edinburgh & Dalkeith Railway	1846	
Portobello (NBR-Edinburgh)	North British Railway	1964	
Porton	London and South Western Railway	1968	
Portpatrick	Portpatrick and Wigtownshire Railway	1950	
Portpatrick Harbour	Portpatrick Railway	1868	
Portskewett	GWR	1863; 1964	
Portskewett Pier	GWR	1886	
Portsmouth (West Yorkshire)	Lancashire and Yorkshire Railway	1958	
Portsoy	Great North of Scotland Railway	1884; 1968	
Portswood	London and South Western Railway	1866	
Portwood (Stockport)	Cheshire Lines Committee	1875	
Possil	Caledonian Railway	1964	
Possilpark	Glasgow, Dumbarton and Helensburgh Railway	1916	
Postland	Great Northern and Great Eastern Joint Railway	1961	
Potterhanworth	Great Northern and Great Eastern Joint Railway	1955	
Potter Heigham	Midland and Great Northern Joint Railway	1959	
Potter Heigham Bridge Halt	Midland and Great Northern Joint Railway	1959	
Potterhill	Glasgow and South Western Railway	1917	
Potto	NER	1954	
Potton	LNWR	1861; 1968	
Poulton Curve Halt	Preston and Wyre Joint Railway	1952	
Poulton Lane, Morecambe	LNWR	1886	
Powderhall	North British Railway	1917	
Powerstock	GWR	1975	
Poyle Estate Halt	British Railways	1965	
Poyle for Stanwell Moor Halt	GWR	1965	

=== Pr ===
Station (Town, unless in station name)	Rail company	Year closed	Notes
Praze	GWR	1962	
Preesall	Knott End Railway	1930	
Prescott	Cleobury Mortimer and Ditton Priors Light Railway	1938	
Presteign	GWR	1951	
Presthope	GWR	1951	
Preston Brook	L&NWR	1948	
Preston Deepdale Street	Preston and Longridge Railway	1856	
Preston Fishergate Hill	West Lancashire Railway	1900	
Preston Maudland Bridge	Fleetwood, Preston and West Riding Junction Railway	1885	
Preston Maudlands	Preston and Wyre Joint Railway	1844	
Preston Maxwell House	Bolton and Preston Railway	1844	
Preston Platform	GWR	1914	
Prickwillow	Eastern Counties Railway	1850	
Priestfield	GWR	1972	
Primrose Hill	North London Railway	1992	
Prince of Wales Halt	Romney, Hythe & Dymchurch Railway	1928	
Princes Dock	Liverpool Overhead Railway	1941	
Princes End	LNWR	1916	
Princes End & Coseley	GWR	1962	
Princes Street (Edinburgh)	North British Railway	1868	
Princes Street (Edinburgh)	Caledonian Railway	1965	
Princes Street (Perth)	Caledonian Railway	1966	
Princetown	GWR	1956	
Priory Halt	GER	1965	
Priory Road (Wells)	Somerset & Dorset Joint Railway	1951	
Privett	London & South Western Railway	1955	
Probus and Ladock Halt	GWR	1957	
Prospect Hill	Blyth & Tyne Railway	1864	

=== Pu ===
Station (Town, unless in station name)	Rail company	Year closed	Notes
Pudsey Greenside	Great Northern Railway (Great Britain)	1964	
Pudsey Lowtown	Great Northern Railway (Great Britain)	1964	
Pulford	GWR	1855	
Pulham Market	Great Eastern Railway	1953	
Pulham St Mary	Great Eastern Railway	1953	
Pullabrook Halt	GWR	1959	
Puncheston	GWR	1937	
Purfleet Rifle Range Halt	London, Tilbury and Southend Railway	1948	
Purley Downs Golf Club Halt	London, Brighton and South Coast Railway	1927	
Purton	GWR	1964	
Puxton and Worle	GWR	1964	

=== Pw ===
Station (Town, unless in station name)	Rail company	Year closed	Notes
Pwll-y-Pant	Rhymney Railway	1893	

=== Py ===
Station (Town, unless in station name)	Rail company	Year closed	Notes
Pye Bridge	Midland Railway	1967	
Pye Hill and Somercotes	GNR	1963	
Pyle	GWR	1964	New station opened in 1994
Pylle Halt	Somerset and Dorset Joint Railway	1966	

== Q ==
Station (Town, unless in station name)	Rail company	Year closed	Notes
Quainton Road	Metropolitan and Great Central Joint Railway	1963 regular services. Still used for special trains	
Quakers Yard High Level	GWR	1964	
Quarter	Caledonian	1945	
Quarter Bridge	Isle of Man Railway	1929	
Queenborough Pier	London, Chatham and Dover Railway	1923	
Queen's Bridge	Belfast Central Railway	1885	
Queen's Quay	Belfast and County Down Railway	1976	
Queensbury (West Yorkshire)	GNR	1955	
Queensferry	L&NWR	1966	
Quellyn Lake	North Wales Narrow Gauge Railways/Welsh Highland Railway	1936	
Quorn and Woodhouse	Great Central Railway	1963 reopened by GC railway Society	
Quy	Great Eastern Railway	1962	

== R ==
=== Ra ===
Station (Town, unless in station name)	Rail company	Year closed	Notes
Racks	Glasgow and South Western Railway	1965	
Radcliffe Black Lane	Lancashire and Yorkshire Railway	1970	
Radcliffe Bridge	Lancashire and Yorkshire Railway	1958	
Radclive Halt	British Railways	1961	
Radford	Midland Railway	1964	
Radford and Timsbury Halt	GWR	1925	
Radipole	GWR	1984	
Radstock North	Somerset and Dorset Joint Railway	1966	
Radstock West	GWR	1959	
Radway Green and Barthomley	North Staffordshire Railway	1966	
Rafford	Highland Railway	1865	
Raglan	GWR	1955	
Raglan Footpath	GWR	1876	
Raglan Road Crossing Halt	GWR	1876; 1955	
Rainford Village	LNWR	1951	
Rainton	Newcastle and Darlington Junction Railway	1844	
Rainton Meadows	Newcastle and Darlington Junction Railway	1844	
Ramper Road	Preston and Wyre Joint Railway	1843	
Rampside	Furness Railway	1936	
Ramsbottom	Lancashire and Yorkshire Railway	1972 reopened 1987	
Ramsden Dock	Furness Railway	1915	
Ramsey (Isle of Man)	Manx Northern Railway	1968	
Ramsey East	Great Northern and Great Eastern Joint Railway	1930	
Ramsey North	GNR	1947	
Ramsgate Harbour	London, Chatham and Dover Railway	1926	
Ramsgate Town	South Eastern Railway	1926	
Ramsgill	Nidd Valley Light Railway	1930	
Ramsline Halt	British Railways	1997	
Rankinston	Glasgow and South Western Railway	1950	
Ranskill	GNR	1958	
Raskelf	NER	1958	
Ratby	Midland Railway	1928	
Rathen	Great North of Scotland Railway	1965	
Ratho	North British Railway	1951	
Ratho Low Level	North British Railway	1930	
Rathven	Highland Railway	1915	
Raunds	Midland Railway	1959	
Ravelrig Junction Platform	Caledonian Railway	1920	
Ravenscar	NER	1965	
Ravenscraig	Caledonian Railway	1944	
Ravensthorpe	London and North Western Railway	2025	
Ravensthorpe Lower	Lancashire and Yorkshire Railway	1952	
Ravenstonedale	NER	1952	
Rawlinson Bridge	Bolton and Preston Railway	1841	
Rawtenstall	Lancashire and Yorkshire Railway	1972 reopened 1987	
Rawyards	North British Railway	1930	
Raydon Wood	Great Eastern Railway	1932	
Rayne	Great Eastern Railway	1952	
Raynham Park	Midland and Great Northern Joint Railway	1959	

=== Re ===
Station (Town, unless in station name)	Rail company	Year closed	Notes
Reading Southern	South Eastern Railway (UK)	1965	
Rearsby	Midland Railway	1951	
Red House	Van Railway	1879	
Red Lion Crossing Halt	GWR	1926	
Red Rock	Lancashire and Yorkshire Railway & Lancashire Union Railway joint	1949	
Red Wharf Bay and Benllech	LNWR	1930	
Redbourn	Midland Railway	1947	
Redbrook on Wye	GWR	1959	
Redcastle	Highland Railway	1951	
Redenhall	Great Eastern Railway	1866	
Redheugh	Newcastle and Carlisle Railway	1853	
Redhurst Crossing	North Staffordshire Railway	1934	
Redmarshall	NER	1952	
Redmile	Great Northern and London and North Western Joint Railway	1951	
Redmire	NER	1954	
Rednal and West Felton	GWR	1960	
Reedley Hallows Halt	Lancashire and Yorkshire Railway	1956	
Reedness Junction	Axholme Joint Railway	1933	
Reedsmouth	North British Railway	1956	
Reepham (Lincoln)	Great Central Railway	1965	
Reepham (Norfolk)	Great Eastern Railway	1952	
Renfrew Fulbar Street	Glasgow and South Western Railway	1967	
Renfrew Porterfield	Glasgow and Paisley Joint Railway	1926	
Renfrew South	Glasgow and South Western Railway	1967	
Renfrew Wharf	Glasgow and South Western Railway	1967	
Renishaw Central	Great Central Railway	1963	
Repton and Willington	Midland Railway	1968 reopened 1994 as Willington	
Resolven	GWR	1964	
Respryn	Cornwall Railway	1859	
Reston	North British Railway	1964 New station opened on different site in 2022	
Retford	Sheffield and Lincolnshire Junction Railway	1859	
Rewley Road (Oxford)	LNWR	1951	

=== Rh ===
Station (Town, unless in station name)	Rail company	Year closed	Notes
Rhayader	Cambrian Railways	1962	
Rhewl	LNWR	1962	
Rhigos Halt	GWR	1964	
Rhiwderin	Brecon and Merthyr Railway	1954	
Rhoose	Barry Railway	1964 reopened 2005	
Rhos	Shrewsbury and Chester Railway	1855	
Rhos	GWR	1931	
Rhosddu Halt	Great Central Railway	1917	
Rhosgoch	LNWR	1964	
Rhosrobin Halt	GWR	1947	
Rhostryfan	North Wales Narrow Gauge Railway	1914	
Rhostyllen	GWR	1931	
Rhosymedre	Shrewsbury and Chester Railway	1849	
Rhosymedre Halt	GWR	1959	
Rhu	West Highland Railway	1964	
Rhuddlan	LNWR	1955	
Rhyd Ddu	North Wales Narrow Gauge Railways	1936 reopened 2003	
Rhydowen Halt	GWR	1962	
Rhydyfelin (High Level) Halt	GWR	1928; 1953	
Rhydyfelin (Low Level) Halt	Cardiff Railway	1931	
Rhydymwyn	LNWR	1962	
Rhyd-y-Saint	LNWR	1930	
Rhymney Bridge	Nantybwch and Rhymney Joint Railway	1958	
Rhymney Lower and Pontlottyn	Brecon and Merthyr Railway	1930	

=== Ri ===
Station (Town, unless in station name)	Rail company	Year closed	Notes
Ribblehead	Midland Railway	1970 reopened 1986	
Ribbleton	Lancashire and Yorkshire Railway/LNWR	1866	
Ribbleton	Preston and Longridge Railway	1930	
Riby Street Platform	Great Central Railway	1941	
Riccall	NER	1958	
Riccarton Junction	North British Railway	1969	
Richborough Castle Halt	SR	1939	
Richmond (North Yorkshire)	NER	1969	
Richmond Road Halt	Bideford, Westward Ho! and Appledore Railway	1917	
Rickmansworth Church Street	Watford and Rickmansworth Railway	1952	
Riddings Junction	North British Railway	1964	
Ridge Bridge	Leeds and Selby Railway	1924	
Rifle Range Halt (near Bewdley)	GWR	1920	
Rifle Range Halt (Morayshire) (near Elgin)	Great North of Scotland Railway	c. 1950	
Rigg	Glasgow and South Western Railway	1942	
Rillington	NER	1930	
Rimington	Lancashire and Yorkshire Railway	1958	
Ringley Road	Lancashire and Yorkshire Railway	1953	
Ringstead and Addington	LNWR	1964	
Ringwood	London and South Western Railway	1964	
Ripley	Midland Railway	1889; 1930	
Ripley Valley	NER	1951	
Ripon	NER	1967	
Rippingale	GNR	1930	
Ripple	Midland Railway	1961	
Ripponden and Barkisland	Lancashire and Yorkshire Railway	1929	
Risca	GWR	1962 (reopened 2008)	
Rishworth	Lancashire and Yorkshire Railway	1929	
River Douglas	West Lancashire Railway	1887	

=== Ro ===
Station (Town, unless in station name)	Rail company	Year closed	Notes
Roade	LNWR	1881; 1964	
Roadwater	West Somerset Mineral Railway	1898	
Roath	GWR	1917	
Robertstown Halt	Taff Vale Railway	1952	
Robin Hood	East and West Yorkshire Union Railways	1904	
Robin Hood's Bay	Scarborough and Whitby Railway	1965	
Robins Lane Halt	LMSR	1938	
Robroyston	Caledonian Railway	1956 Reopened 2019	
Rocester	North Staffordshire Railway	1965	
Rochdale Road Halt (West Yorkshire)	Lancashire and Yorkshire Railway	1929	
Rochester Bridge	London, Chatham and Dover Railway	1917	
Rochester Common later Central	South Eastern Railway (UK)	1911	
Rock Lane	Birkenhead Railway	1862	
Rockcliffe	Caledonian Railway	1950	
Rockingham	LNWR	1966	
Rodmarton Platform	GWR	1964	
Rodwell	Weymouth and Portland Railway	1952	
Roebuck	Lancaster and Preston Railway	1849	
Roffey Road Halt	London, Brighton and South Coast Railway	1937	
Rogate and Harting	London and South Western Railway	1955	
Rogerstone (Newport)	GWR	1962 (reopened on different site 2008)	
Rohallion	Highland Railway	1864	
Rolleston-on-Dove	North Staffordshire Railway	1949	
Rollright Halt	GWR	1951	
Rolvenden	Kent and East Sussex Railway	1954 reopened 1974	
Romaldkirk	NER	1964	
Roman Road (Yorkshire)	Leeds and Selby Railway	1834	
Roman Road (Kent)	East Kent Light Railway	1928	
Romney Sands	Romney, Hythe and Dymchurch Railway	1974 resited	
Rood End	GWR	1885	
Roodyards	Dundee and Arbroath Railway	1840	
Rookery	LNWR	1862; 1951	
Ropley	LSWR	1973 reopened 1977	
Rosebush	Narberth Road and Maenclochog Railway/GWR	1937	
Rosehill (Archer Street Halt)	Cleator and Workington Junction Railway	1926 public 1929 workmen	
Rosemount Halt	Caledonian Railway	1955	
Rosewell and Hawthornden	North British Railway	1962	
Rosherville Halt	London, Chatham and Dover Railway	1933	
Roslin	North British Railway	1933	
Rossett	GWR	1964	
Rossington	GNR	1958	
Rosslyn Castle	North British Railway	1951	
Rosslynlee	North British Railway	1962	
Rosslynlee Hospital Halt	British Railways	1962	
Ross-on-Wye	GWR	1964	
Roster Road Halt	LMSR	1944	
Rothbury	North British Railway	1952	
Rotherfield and Mark Cross	London, Brighton and South Coast Railway	1965	
Rotherham Central	Great Central Railway	1966 (reopened in 1987)	
Rotherham Masborough (also known as "Masbrough" and as "Rotherham")	North Midland Railway	1988	
Rotherham Road	Manchester, Sheffield and Lincolnshire Railway	1953	
Rotherham Westgate	Sheffield and Rotherham Railway	1952	
Rothes	Great North of Scotland Railway	1968	
Rothiebrisbane Farm Platform	Great North of Scotland Railway	1918	
Rothiemay	Great North of Scotland Railway	1968	
Rothienorman	Great North of Scotland Railway	1951	
Rothley	Great Central Railway	1963 reopened by GC Railway Society	
Rothwell (West Yorkshire)	East and West Yorkshire Union Railways	1904	
Rotton Park Road	LNWR	1934	
Roudham Junction	Great Eastern Railway	1932 regular services; 1964 completely	
Round Oak	GWR	1962	
Roundball Halt	London and South Western Railway	1921	
Roundwood Halt	LMSR	1947	
Rowan Halt	Southern Railway	1939	
Rowden Mill	GWR	1952	
Rowfant	London, Brighton and South Coast Railway	1967	
Rowlands Gill	NER	1954	
Rowley	NER	1939	
Rowntree Halt (York)	LNER	1988	
Rowrah	Whitehaven, Cleator and Egremont Junction Railway	1931	
Rowsley	Midland Railway	1862; 1967	
Rowthorn and Hardwick	Midland Railway	1930	
Rowton Halt	GWR	1963	
Roxburgh	North British Railway	1964	
Royal Albert Dock	Port of London Authority	c. 1964	
Royal Gardens (Leeds)	NER	1857	
Royal Pier (Southampton)	London and South Western Railway	1914	
Royal Showground	LNWR	1903	
Royston and Notton	Midland Railway	1900; 1968	
Royton	Lancashire and Yorkshire Railway	1966	
Royton Junction	Lancashire and Yorkshire Railway	1987	

=== Ru ===
Station (Town, unless in station name)	Rail company	Year closed	Notes
Rubery	Halesowen Joint Railway	1919	
Ruddington	Great Central Railway	1963	
Ruddington Factory Halt	Great Central Railway	1948	
Ruddle Road Halt	GWR	1917	
Rudgwick	London, Brighton and South Coast Railway	1965	
Rudyard (renamed Rudyard Lake)	North Staffordshire Railway	1960	
Rudyard Lake (renamed Cliffe Park)	North Staffordshire Railway	1960	
Rugby Central	Great Central Railway	1969	
Rugby Road Halt	North and South Western Junction Railway	1917	
Rugeley Town	LNWR	1965 reopened 1997	
Ruislip Gardens	GWR/GCR Joint Railway	1958	
Rumbling Bridge	North British Railway	1964	
Rumworth and Daubhill	LNWR	1952	
Runcorn Gap	St Helens and Runcorn Gap Railway	1852	
Rushall	LNWR	1909	
Rushbury	GWR	1951	
Rushcliffe Halt	Great Central Railway	1963	
Rushden	Midland Railway	1959	
Rushey Platt	Midland and South Western Junction Railway	1905	
Rushford	Manchester and Birmingham Railway	1843	
Rushton	North Staffordshire Railway	1960	
Rushwick Halt	GWR	1965	
Ruspidge Halt	GWR	1958	
Rutherford	North British Railway	1964	
Ruthin	LNWR	1962	
Ruthrieston	Great North of Scotland Railway	1937	
Ruthven Road	Caledonian Railway	1951	
Ruthwell	Glasgow and South Western Railway	1965	
Rutland Street (Swansea)	Swansea and Mumbles Railway	1960	

=== Ry ===
Station (Town, unless in station name)	Rail company	Year closed	Notes
Ryburgh	Great Eastern Railway	1964	
Ryder's Hays	South Staffordshire Railway	1858	
Rye	Rye and Camber Tramway	1939	
Ryeford	Midland Railway	1947	
Ryehill and Burstwick	NER	1964	
Ryeland	Caledonian Railway	1939	
Ryhall and Belmisthorpe	GNR	1959	
Ryhill and Wintersett	Great Central Railway	1930	
Ryhill Halt	Dearne Valley Railway	1951	
Ryhope	NER	1953	
Ryhope East	NER	1960	
Rylstone	Midland Railway	1930	
Ryston	Great Eastern Railway	1930	
Ryton	NER	1954	
