= Roman Road railway station =

More than one Roman Road railway station is known to Wikipedia:

- Roman Road railway station (Kent); a closed station on the East Kent Light Railway
- Roman Road railway station (Yorkshire); a closed station on the Leeds and Selby Railway
