= Glenwhilly railway station =

Disused railway station in Glenwhilly, Dumfries and Galloway

Glenwhilly
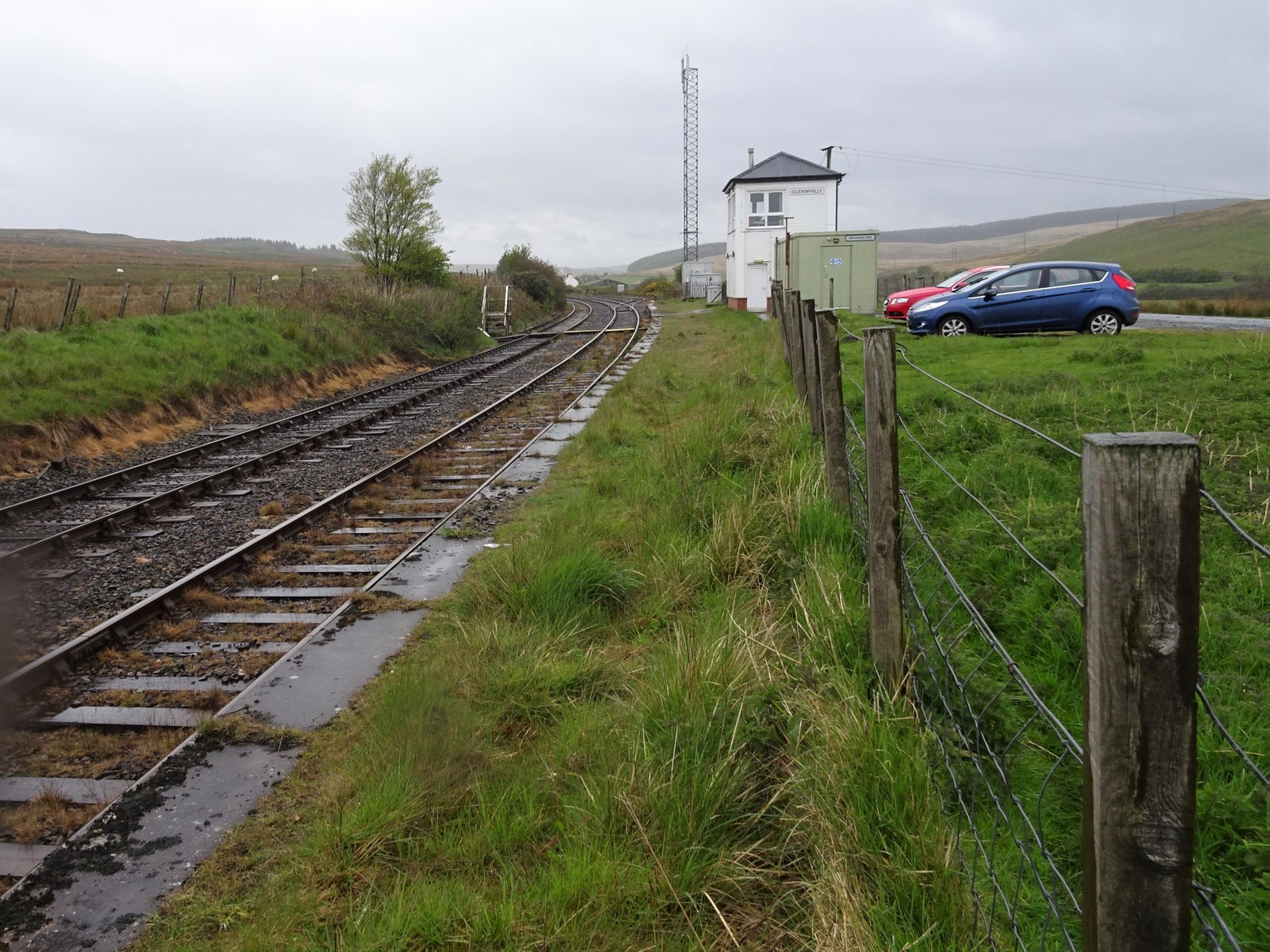
- The site of the station, looking north towards Barrhill, in 2019

General information
- Location: Glenwhilly, Dumfries and Galloway; Scotland
- Coordinates: 54.9995°N 4.8621°W
- Grid reference: NX170709
- Platforms: 1; 2 (later added)

Other information
- Status: Disused

History
- Original company: Girvan and Portpatrick Junction Railway
- Pre-grouping: Glasgow and South Western Railway
- Post-grouping: London, Midland and Scottish Railway; British Railways (Scottish Region)

Key dates
- 5 October 1877: Opened
- 7 February 1882: Closed
- 16 February 1882: Reopened
- 12 April 1886: Closed again
- 14 June 1886: Reopened
- 6 September 1965: Closed
Location

Glenwhilly railway station served the area of Glenwhilly, Dumfries and Galloway, Scotland from 1887 to 1965 on the Girvan and Portpatrick Junction Railway.

== History ==
The station opened on 5 October 1877 by the Girvan and Portpatrick Junction Railway. On the southbound platform was the signal box, which was replaced in 1905. The second platform was added in 1937. To the east was a siding which served a cattle pen. The station closed on 7 February 1882 but reopened nine days later on 16 February 1882. It closed again on 12 April 1886, reopened on 14 June 1886 and finally closed on 6 September 1965. The signal box and passing loop remain in use as of 2025.

Preceding station	Historical railways	Following station
Barrhill; Line and station open	Girvan and Portpatrick Junction Railway	New Luce; Line open, station closed
