= New Luce railway station =

Disused railway station in New Luce, Dumfries and Galloway

New Luce
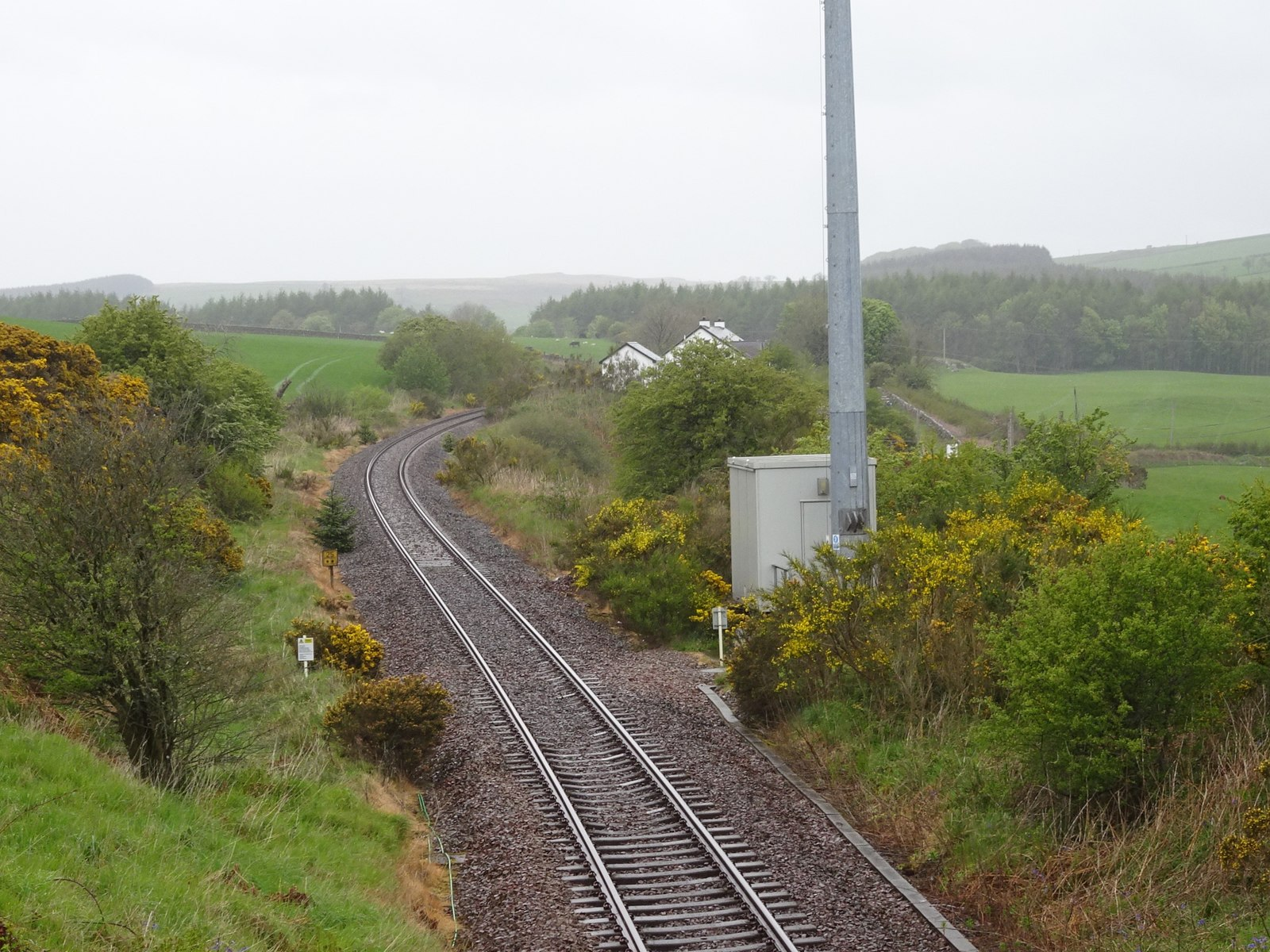
- The site of the station, looking north towards Glenwhilly, in 2019

General information
- Location: New Luce, Dumfries and Galloway; Scotland
- Coordinates: 54.9415°N 4.8593°W
- Grid reference: NX169644
- Platforms: 2

Other information
- Status: Disused

History
- Original company: Girvan and Portpatrick Junction Railway
- Pre-grouping: Glasgow and South Western Railway
- Post-grouping: London, Midland and Scottish Railway; British Railways (Scottish Region)

Key dates
- 5 October 1877: Opened
- 7 February 1882: Closed
- 16 February 1882: Reopened
- 12 April 1886: Closed again
- 14 June 1886: Reopened
- 6 September 1965: Closed
Location

New Luce railway station served the village of New Luce, Dumfries and Galloway, Scotland from 1887 to 1965 on the Girvan and Portpatrick Junction Railway.

== History ==
The station opened on 5 October 1877 by the Girvan and Portpatrick Junction Railway. To the south was the goods yard, which had a goods shed, and at the south end of the northbound platform was the signal box. The station closed on 7 February 1882 but reopened nine days later on 16 February 1882. It closed again on 12 April 1886, reopened on 14 June 1886 and finally closed on 6 September 1965. The signal box closed in 1971.

Preceding station	Historical railways	Following station
Glenwhilly; Line open, station closed	Girvan and Portpatrick Junction Railway	Dunragit; Line open, station closed
