= Barrhill railway station =

Railway station of Barrhill, South Ayrshire, Scotland

Barrhill Scottish Gaelic: Am Bàrr
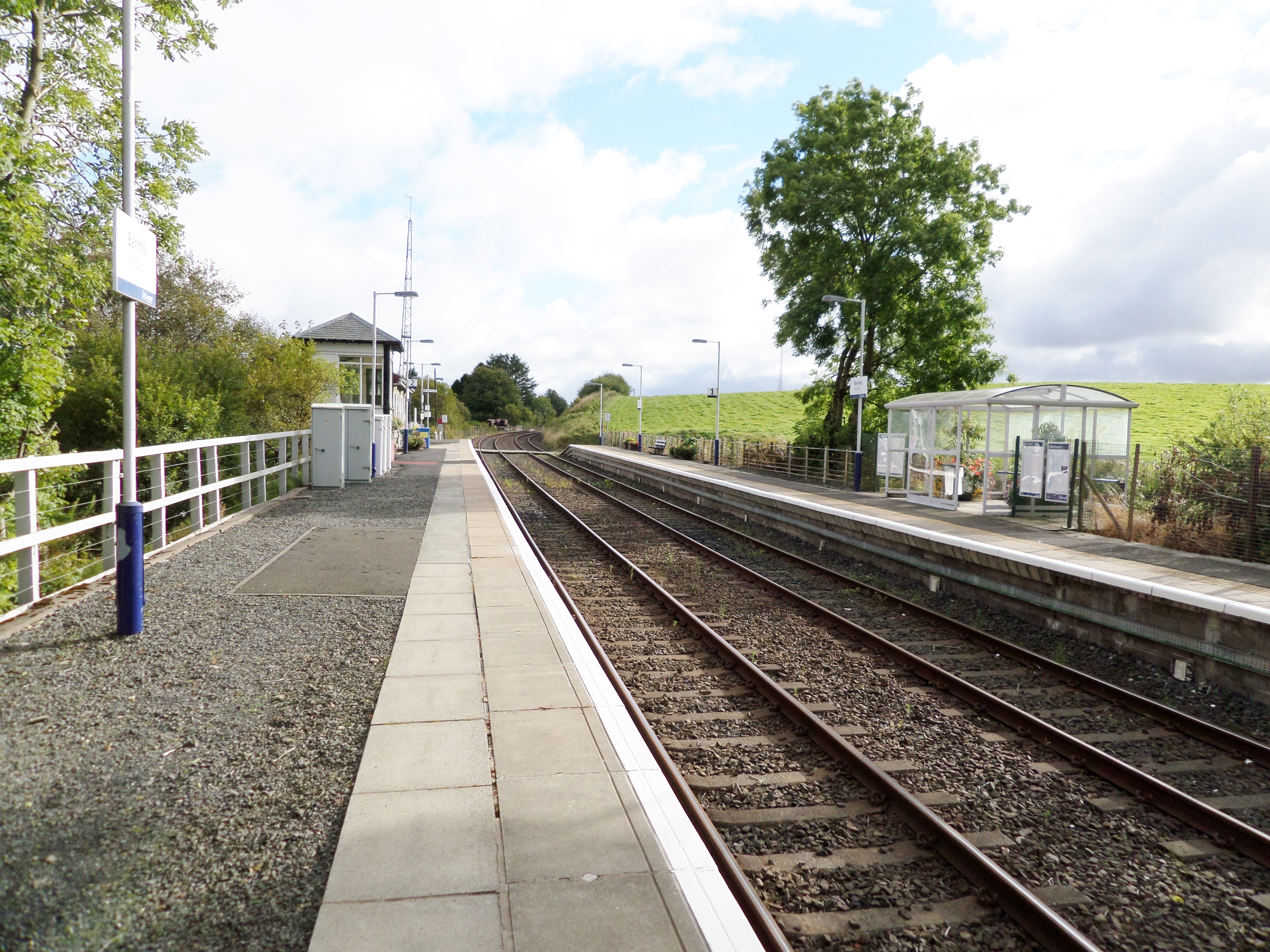

General information
- Location: Barrhill, South Ayrshire; Scotland
- Coordinates: 55.0975°N 4.7822°W
- Grid reference: NX225816
- Owner: Network Rail
- Manager: ScotRail
- Transit authority: SPT
- Platforms: 2

Other information
- Station code: BRL

History
- Original company: Girvan and Portpatrick Junction Railway
- Pre-grouping: Glasgow and South Western Railway
- Post-grouping: LMS

Key dates
- 5 October 1877: Opened

Passengers
- 2021/22: ▲3,430
- 2022/23: ▲5,024
- 2023/24: ▼3,874
- 2024/25: ▲3,878
- 2025/26: ▲6,924
Location
Notes
- Passenger statistics from the Office of Rail and Road

Barrhill railway station is a railway station serving the village of Barrhill, South Ayrshire, Scotland, approximately 0.5 miles (0.80 km) north-east of the station. The station is managed by ScotRail and is on the Ayr to Stranraer section of the Glasgow South Western Line between Girvan and Stranraer, 12 miles 35 chains (20.0 km) from the former junction at Girvan. A passing loop 19 chains (380 metres) long is located here on what is otherwise a single track route.

== History ==
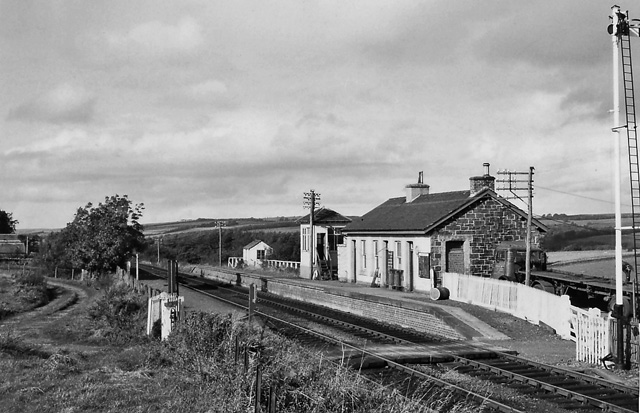
The station seen in 1974

The station was opened by the Girvan and Portpatrick Junction Railway on 5 October 1877. The station was briefly closed between 7 February 1882 and 16 February 1882, and between 12 April 1886 and 14 June 1886.

The station features in the novel Five Red Herrings by Dorothy L Sayers, first published in 1931.

The line that runs through Barrhill station was temporarily closed between August and November 2018 due to the closures of platform 3 and 4 of Ayr station. This was caused by the adjacent hotel building that was found to be structurally unsound, which was then subsequently secured, allowing services to resume.

=== Signalling ===
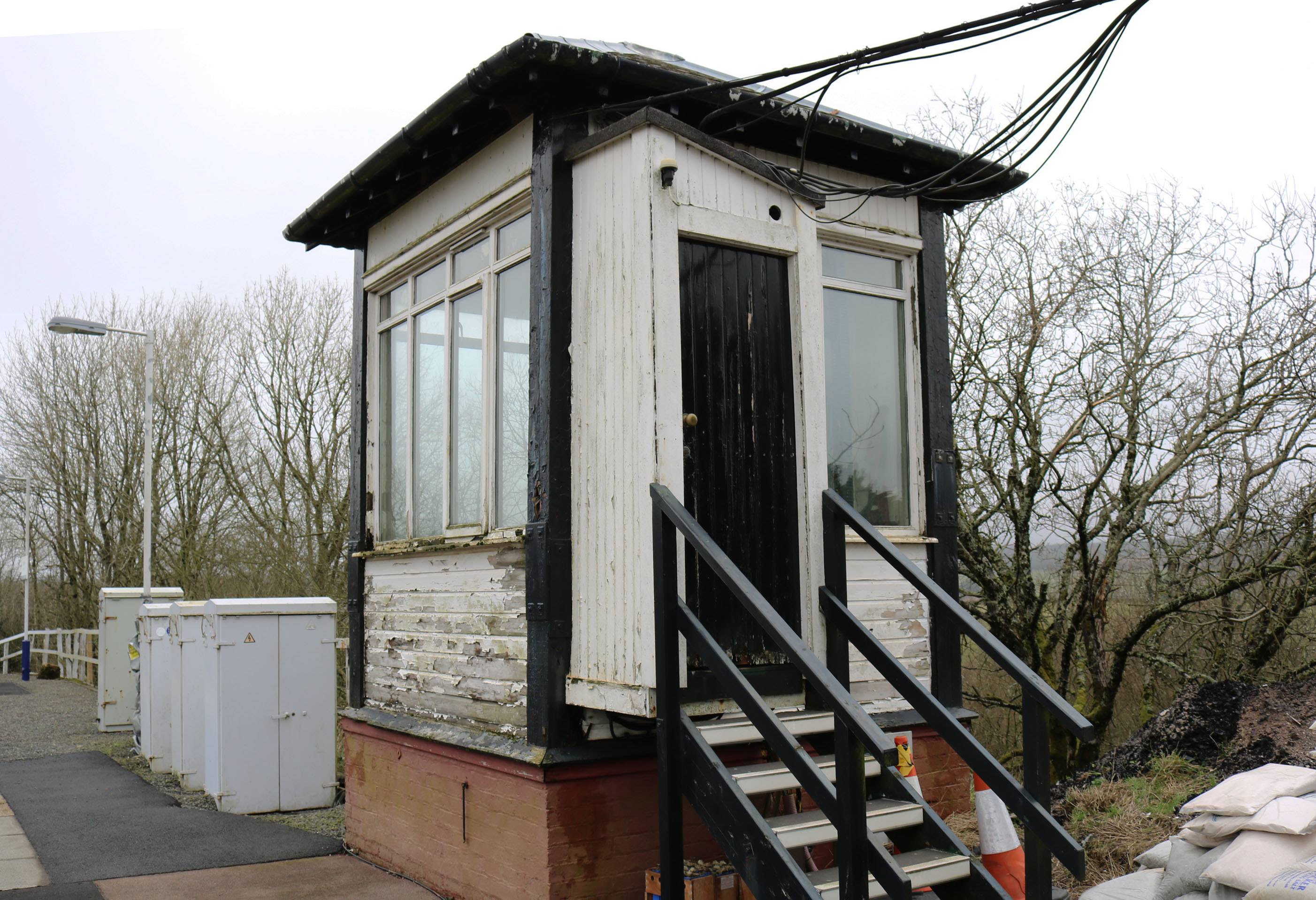
The signal box in 2019

The small signal box that houses the lever frame operating the loop was installed in 1935 after its predecessor was destroyed by fire (this in turn replaced the first signal box, which was removed in 1907) - it was originally situated further down the line at Portpatrick but dismantled and moved to Barrhill after becoming redundant at its original location. The box only houses the frame however - the tablet instruments and block bells are in the main station building, which allows one railman to act as both stationmaster and signaller.

In 2022, a car park was built at the station by South West Scotland Community Rail Partnership, with funding from Barrhill CIC, Kilgallioch Community Fund and Carrick Futures, additional community benefit support from Ayrshire Roads Alliance and further support from Network Rail and ScotRail.

== Facilities ==
The station's former booking office is closed and not for public use, although the signaller can assist with passenger queries. The station has a small car park, cycle storage, waiting shelters, a toilet, help points and live departure screens.

== Passenger volume ==
Passenger volume at Barrhill
	2004–05	2005–06	2006–07	2007–08	2008–09	2009–10	2010–11	2011–12	2012–13	2013–14	2014–15	2015–16	2016–17	2017–18	2018–19	2019–20	2020–21	2021–22	2022–23	2023–24	2024–25
Entries and exits	5,591	5,352	4,789	4,810	4,864	4,568	4,804	5,290	5,712	11,214	11,016	10,150	13,552	12,980	10,124	7,144	768	3,430	5,024	3,874	3,878

The statistics cover twelve month periods that start in April.

== Services ==
There are 5 trains per day to Stranraer and 5 trains per day to Ayr which run to an irregular 2 to 4 hour frequency (2 of which extend to Kilmarnock with 1 extending onwards to Glasgow Central). The Sunday service is broadly the same except all trains terminate at Ayr heading northbound, and are every 2 hours instead.

Preceding station	National Rail	Following station
Stranraer	ScotRail; Glasgow South Western Line	Girvan
	Historical railways	
Glenwhilly; Line open, station closed	Glasgow and South Western Railway; Girvan and Portpatrick Junction Railway	Pinwherry; Line open; station closed

== Community rail ==
The station, as with most other stations across Ayrshire, including up to Kilmarnock, is part of the South West Scotland Community Rail Partnership.

== Bibliography ==
- Brailsford, Martyn, ed. (December 2017) [1987]. Railway Track Diagrams 1: Scotland & Isle of Man (6th ed.). Frome: Trackmaps. ISBN 978-0-9549866-9-8.
- Butt, R. V. J. (October 1995). The Directory of Railway Stations: details every public and private passenger station, halt, platform and stopping place, past and present (1st ed.). Sparkford: Patrick Stephens Ltd. ISBN 978-1-85260-508-7. OCLC 60251199. OL 11956311M.
- Caton, Peter (2018). Remote Stations. Leicestershire: Matador. ISBN 978-1-78901-408-2.
- Jowett, Alan (March 1989). Jowett's Railway Atlas of Great Britain and Ireland: From Pre-Grouping to the Present Day (1st ed.). Sparkford: Patrick Stephens Ltd. ISBN 978-1-85260-086-0. OCLC 22311137.
