= Llangeinor railway station =

Disused railway station in Llangeinor, Bridgend County Borough

Llangeinor
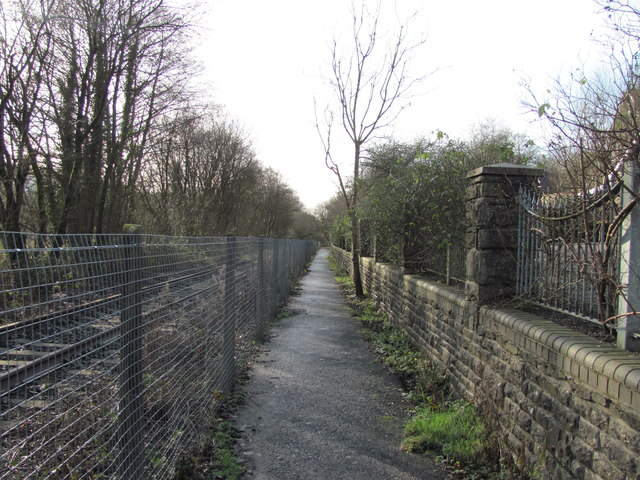
- The site of the station in 2012

General information
- Location: Llangeinor, Glamorgan; Wales
- Coordinates: 51.5774°N 3.5703°W
- Grid reference: SS912876
- Platforms: 2

Other information
- Status: Disused

History
- Original company: Great Western Railway
- Post-grouping: Great Western Railway

Key dates
- 25 October 1886: Opened
- 1 January 1917: Temporarily closed
- 1 January 1919: Reopened
- 9 February 1953: Closed
Location

Llangeinor railway station served the village of Llangeinor, in the historical county of Glamorgan, Wales, from 1886 to 1953 on the Garw Valley Railway.

== History ==
The station was opened on 25 October 1886 by the Great Western Railway. It closed on 1 January 1917 but reopened on 1 January 1919, before closing permanently on 9 February 1953. The track still exists and adjacent is a cycle path that runs between Bryngarw Country Park and Blaengarw.

Preceding station	Disused railways	Following station
Pontyrhyl; Line and station closed	Great Western Railway; Garw Valley Railway	Brynmenyn; Line and station closed
