= Crossmichael railway station =

Disused railway station in Crossmichael, Kirkcudbrightshire

Crossmichael
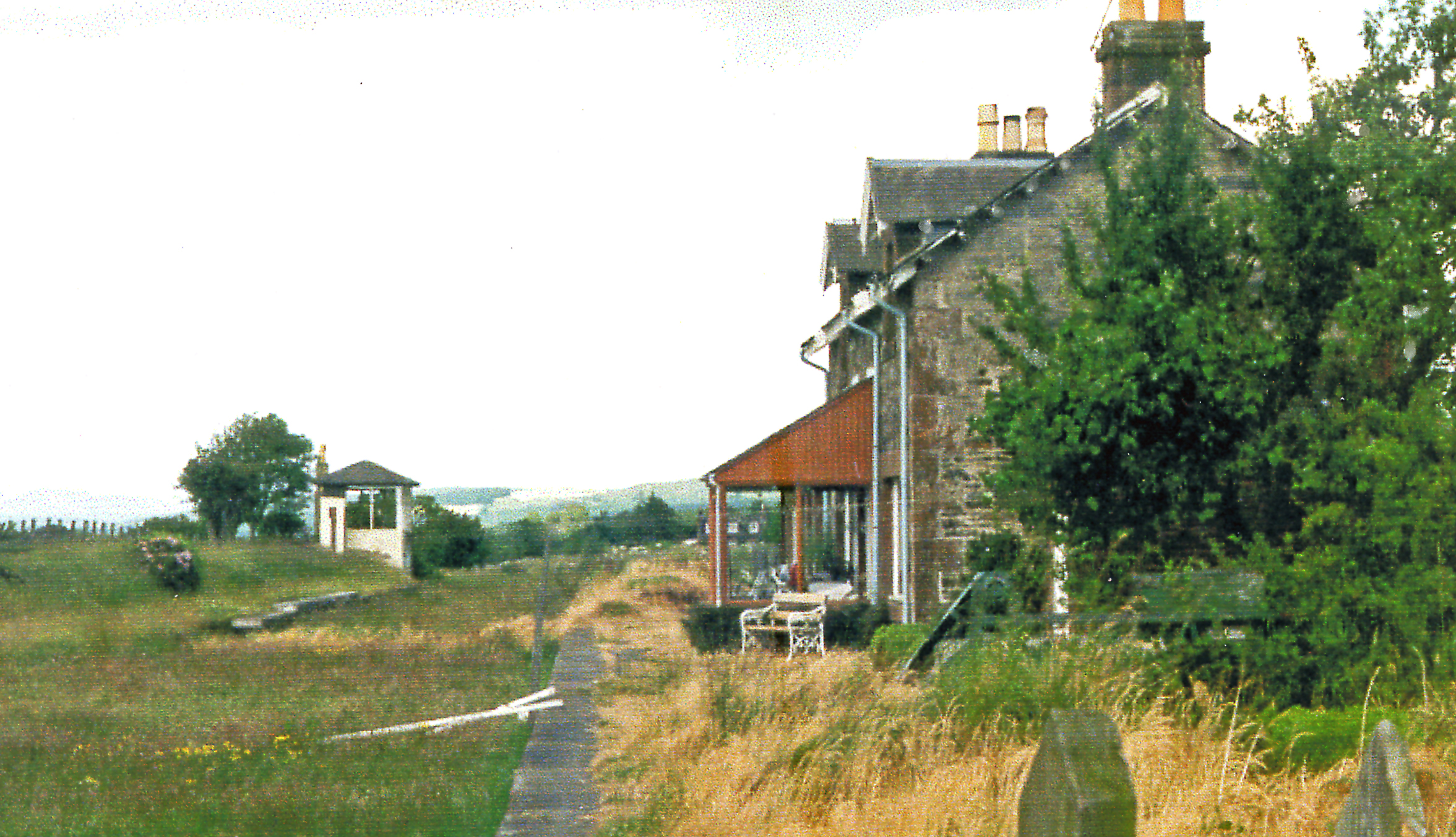
- The site of the station, looking northwest towards Stranraer, in 1986

General information
- Location: Crossmichael, Kirkcudbrightshire; Scotland
- Coordinates: 54.9804°N 3.9876°W
- Grid reference: NX729669
- Platforms: 2

Other information
- Status: Disused

History
- Original company: Portpatrick Railway
- Pre-grouping: Portpatrick and Wigtownshire Joint Railway; Caledonian Railway
- Post-grouping: London, Midland and Scottish Railway; British Rail (Scottish Region)

Key dates
- 12 March 1861: Opened
- 14 June 1965: Closed
Location

Crossmichael railway station served the village of Crossmichael, Kirkcudbrightshire, Scotland, from 1861 to 1965 on the Portpatrick and Wigtownshire Joint Railway.

== History ==
The station opened on 12 March 1861 by the Portpatrick Railway. It closed to both passengers and goods traffic on 14 June 1965.

Preceding station	Disused railways	Following station
Castle Douglas; Line and station closed	Portpatrick and Wigtownshire Joint Railway	Parton; Line and station closed
