= Chester-le-Street railway station =

Railway station in County Durham, England

Chester-le-Street
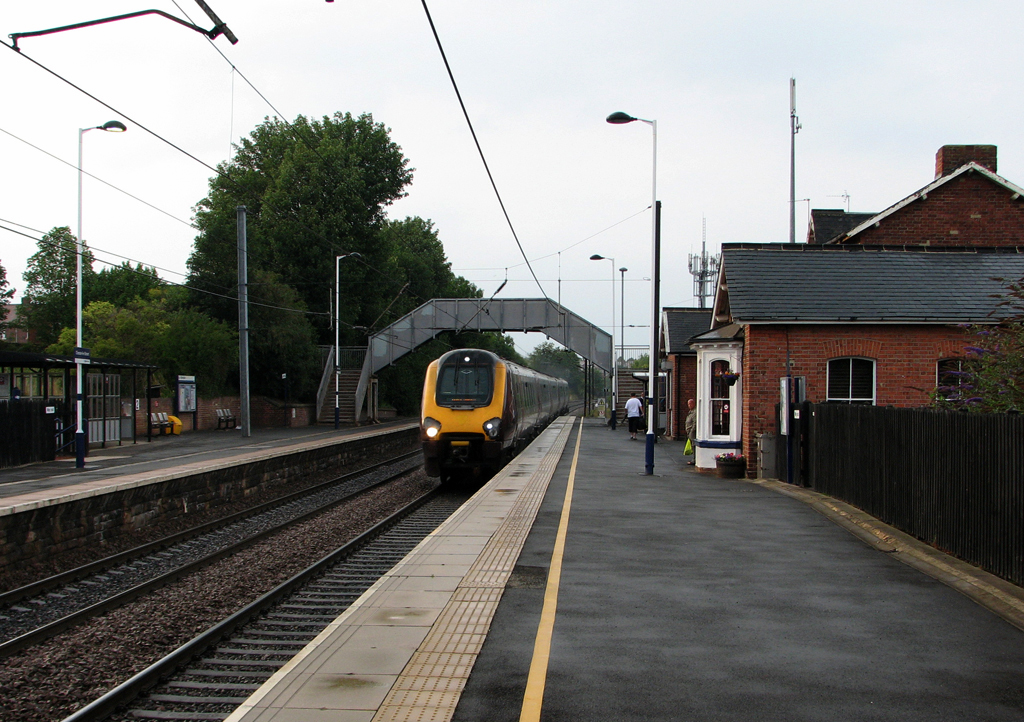

General information
- Location: Chester-le-Street, County Durham; England
- Coordinates: 54°51′16″N 1°34′42″W
- Grid reference: NZ271512
- Owner: Network Rail
- Manager: Northern Trains
- Platforms: 2
- Tracks: 2

Other information
- Station code: CLS
- Classification: DfT category F1

History
- Original company: North Eastern Railway
- Pre-grouping: North Eastern Railway
- Post-grouping: London and North Eastern Railway; British Rail (North Eastern Region)

Key dates
- 1 December 1868: Opened

Passengers
- 2020/21: ▼31,274
- 2021/22: ▲0.149 million
- 2022/23: ▼0.118 million
- 2023/24: ▲0.153 million
- 2024/25: ▲0.232 million
Location
- Location within County Durham
Notes
- Passenger statistics from the Office of Rail and Road

Chester-le-Street is a railway station on the East Coast Main Line, which runs between London King's Cross and Edinburgh Waverley. The station is situated 71 miles 72 chains (115.7 kilometres) from York, serving the market town of Chester-le-Street in County Durham, England. It is owned by Network Rail and managed by Northern Trains.

== History ==
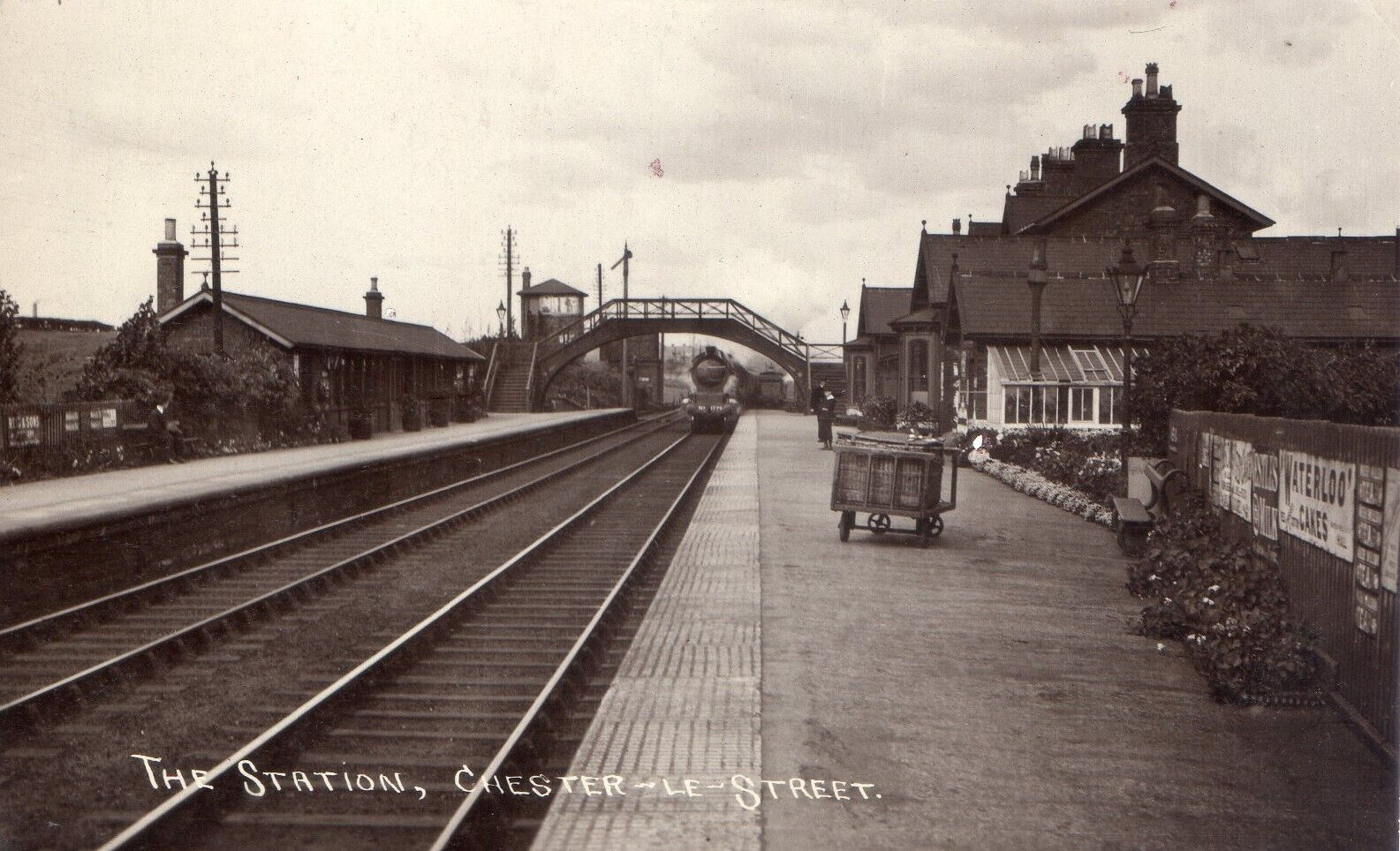
The station seen c. 1910

The Team Valley Line of the North Eastern Railway, which connected Newton Hall Junction, near Durham, with Gateshead was authorised in 1848. However, the line was not opened until 2 March 1868, with the powers having been renewed in 1862. At first only freight trains used the route, but passenger services began on 1 December 1868, with the station opening on the same day. The station was the third station in the town, although the other two closed before the current station opened.

In the 1960s, the station was listed for closure as part of the Beeching Axe, which led to it being mentioned in the song Slow Train by Flanders and Swann. However, the station still remains open today.

In February and March 2022, tactile paving was added to the platform edges.

== Facilities ==
Between 1999 and 2018, Chester-le-Track, an independent private limited company, operated the station as an agent for the local franchised train operating company, which at the time of closure was Arriva Rail North. The station's ticket office, waiting area and toilets were staffed six days per week, prior to the building's closure in early 2018.

Following the building's closure, two self-service ticket machines have since been installed on the southbound platform. The station is unstaffed.

The station has step-free access to both platforms and has shelters, live departure screens, a small car park and cycle storage.

== Passenger volume ==
Passenger volume at Chester-le-Street
| | 2004–05 | 2005–06 | 2006–07 | 2007–08 | 2008–09 | 2009–10 | 2010–11 | 2011–12 | 2012–13 | 2013–14 | 2014–15 | 2015–16 | 2016–17 | 2017–18 | 2018–19 | 2019–20 | 2020–21 | 2021–22 | 2022–23 | 2023–24 | 2024–25 |
|---|---|---|---|---|---|---|---|---|---|---|---|---|---|---|---|---|---|---|---|---|---|
| Entries and exits | 126,033 | 151,486 | 160,799 | 192,519 | 186,930 | 197,398 | 205,572 | 189,460 | 174,968 | 199,131 | 200,844 | 223,326 | 230,972 | 219,592 | 199,260 | 193,456 | 31,274 | 148,692 | 118,086 | 152,994 | 232,324 |

The statistics cover twelve month periods that start in April.

== Services ==
=== Northern Trains ===
Following the May 2021 timetable change, there are three trains per day (Monday to Saturday) heading north towards Newcastle, two of which extend to Carlisle via Hexham. On Sunday, there is a once-daily service to Carlisle. Heading south, there is a once-daily service to Darlington, which extends to Saltburn on Sunday only.

=== TransPennine Express ===
Following the May 2021 timetable change, there is a mostly two-hourly service between Newcastle and Liverpool Lime Street via York, with additional services operating at peak times.

| Preceding station | National Rail | Following station |
|---|---|---|
| Durham | Northern Trains; East Coast Main Line | Newcastle |
| Durham | TransPennine Express; East Coast Main Line | Newcastle |
| | Historical railways | |
| Plawsworth | North Eastern Railway; East Coast Main Line | Birtley |

== Bibliography ==
- Marshall, Geoff; Pipe, Vicki (2018). The Railway Adventures: Places, Trains, People and Stations. September Publishing. ISBN 978-1910463871.
- Quick, Michael (2023) [2001]. Railway Passenger Stations in Great Britain (PDF) (5.05 ed.). London: Railway and Canal Historical Society.
