= Blaengarw railway station =

Disused railway station in Blaengarw, Bridgend County Borough

Blaengarw
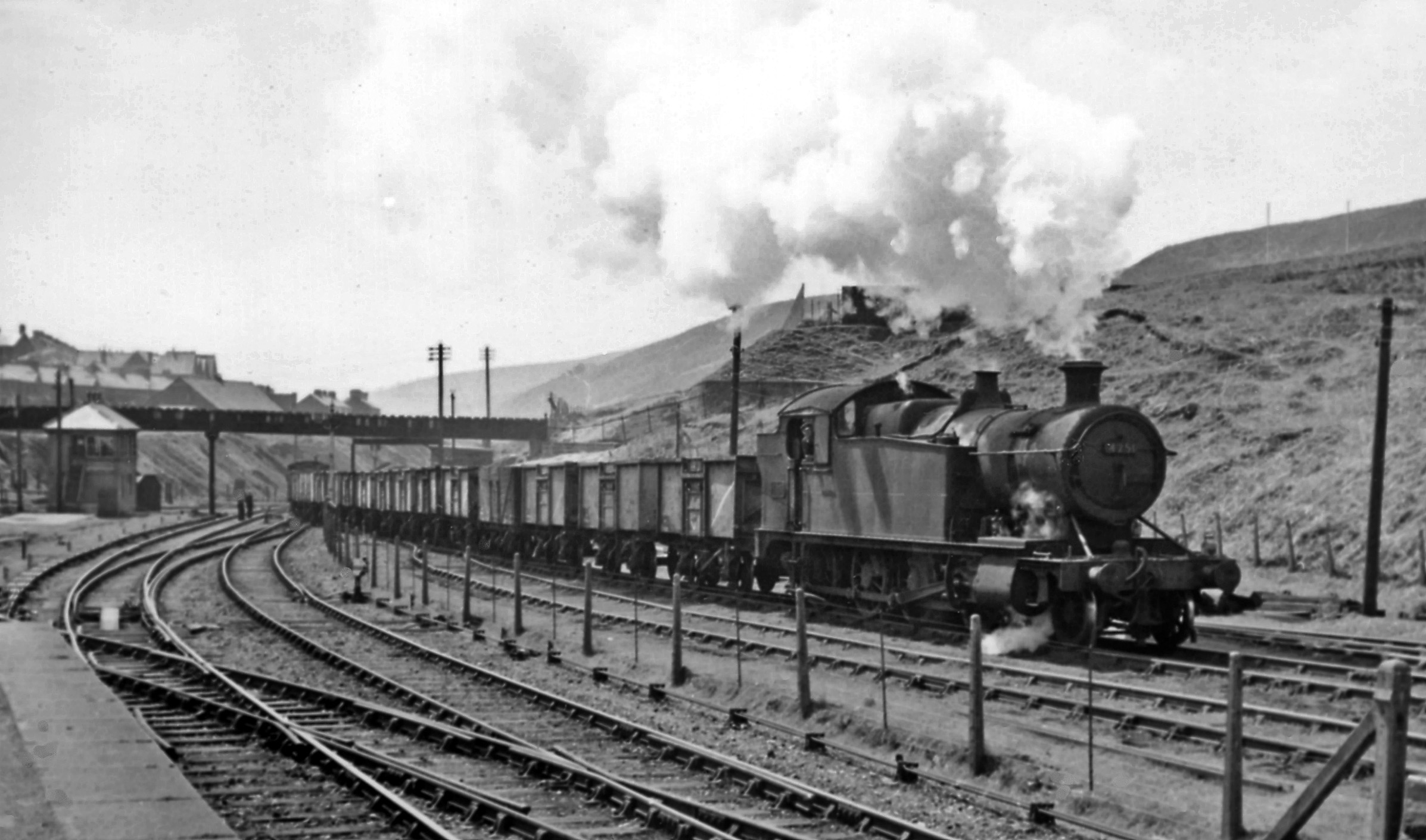
- The site of the station, looking southwest towards Tondu, in 1962

General information
- Location: Blaengarw, Glamorgan; Wales
- Coordinates: 51.6214°N 3.5903°W
- Grid reference: SS900929
- Platforms: 1

Other information
- Status: Disused

History
- Original company: Great Western Railway
- Post-grouping: Great Western Railway

Key dates
- 1877: open for miners
- 26 May 1902: Opened to the public
- 9 February 1953: Closed
Location

Blaengarw railway station served the village of Blaengarw, in the historical county of Glamorgan, Wales, from 1902 to 1953 on the Garw Valley Railway.

== History ==
The station was opened to the public on 26 May 1902, although it was open earlier for miners in 1877. To the north was international colliery. The station closed on 9 February 1953. The colliery closed in 1968.

Preceding station	Disused railways	Following station
Terminus	Great Western Railway; Garw Valley Railway	Pontycymmer; Line and station closed
