= Penmaen Halt railway station =

Disused railway station in Penmaen, Caerphilly

Penmaen Halt

General information
- Location: Penmaen, Monmouthshire; Wales
- Coordinates: 51.6664°N 3.1884°W
- Grid reference: ST179970
- Platforms: 2

Other information
- Status: Disused

History
- Original company: Great Western Railway

Key dates
- 14 March 1927: Opened
- 25 September 1939: Closed
Location

Penmaen Halt railway station served the hamlet of Penmaen, in the historical county of Monmouthshire, Wales, from 1927 to 1939 on the Penar branch line.

== History ==
The station was opened on 14 March 1927 by the Great Western Railway. It closed on 25 September 1939.

Preceding station	Disused railways	Following station
Terminus	Great Western Railway; Penar branch line	Oakdale Halt; Line and station closed
