= Plawsworth railway station =

Disused railway station in Plawsworth, County Durham

Plawsworth
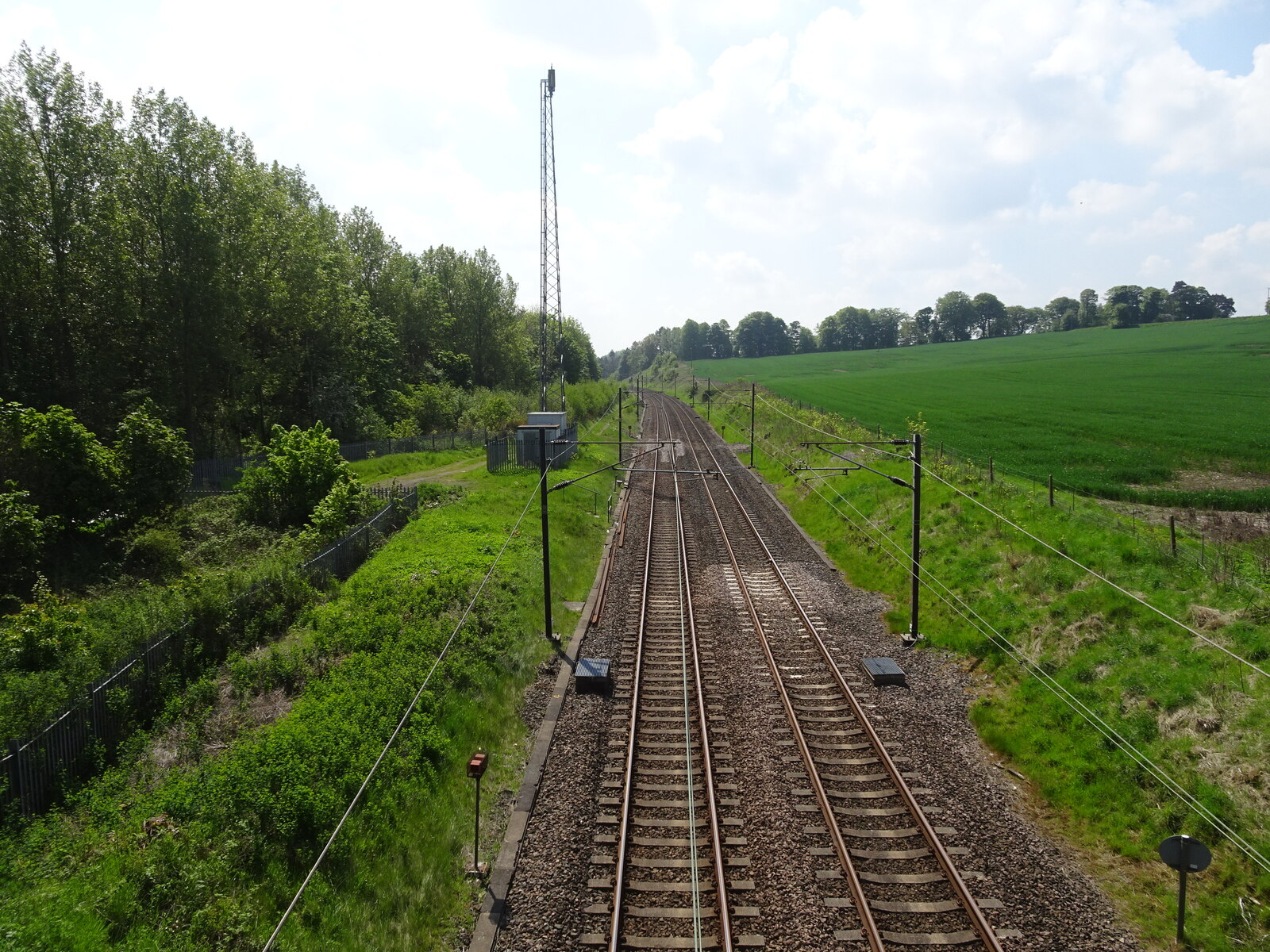
- The site of the station in 2021

General information
- Location: Plawsworth, County Durham; England
- Coordinates: 54.8279°N 1.5828°W
- Grid reference: NZ269482
- Platforms: 2

Other information
- Status: Disused

History
- Original company: North Eastern Railway
- Post-grouping: LNER

Key dates
- 1 December 1868: Opened
- 7 April 1952: Closed to passengers
- 1963: Closed completely
Location

Plawsworth railway station served the village of Plawsworth, County Durham, England from 1868 to 1963 on the East Coast Main Line.

== History ==
The station opened on 1 December 1868 by the North Eastern Railway. It closed to passengers on 7 April 1952 and closed to goods traffic in 1963.

Preceding station	Historical railways	Following station
Durham; Line and station open	North Eastern Railway; East Coast Main Line	Chester-le-Street; Line and station open
