= Dunphail railway station =

Former railway station in Scotland

Coordinates: 57.5126°N 3.6451°W

Dunphail
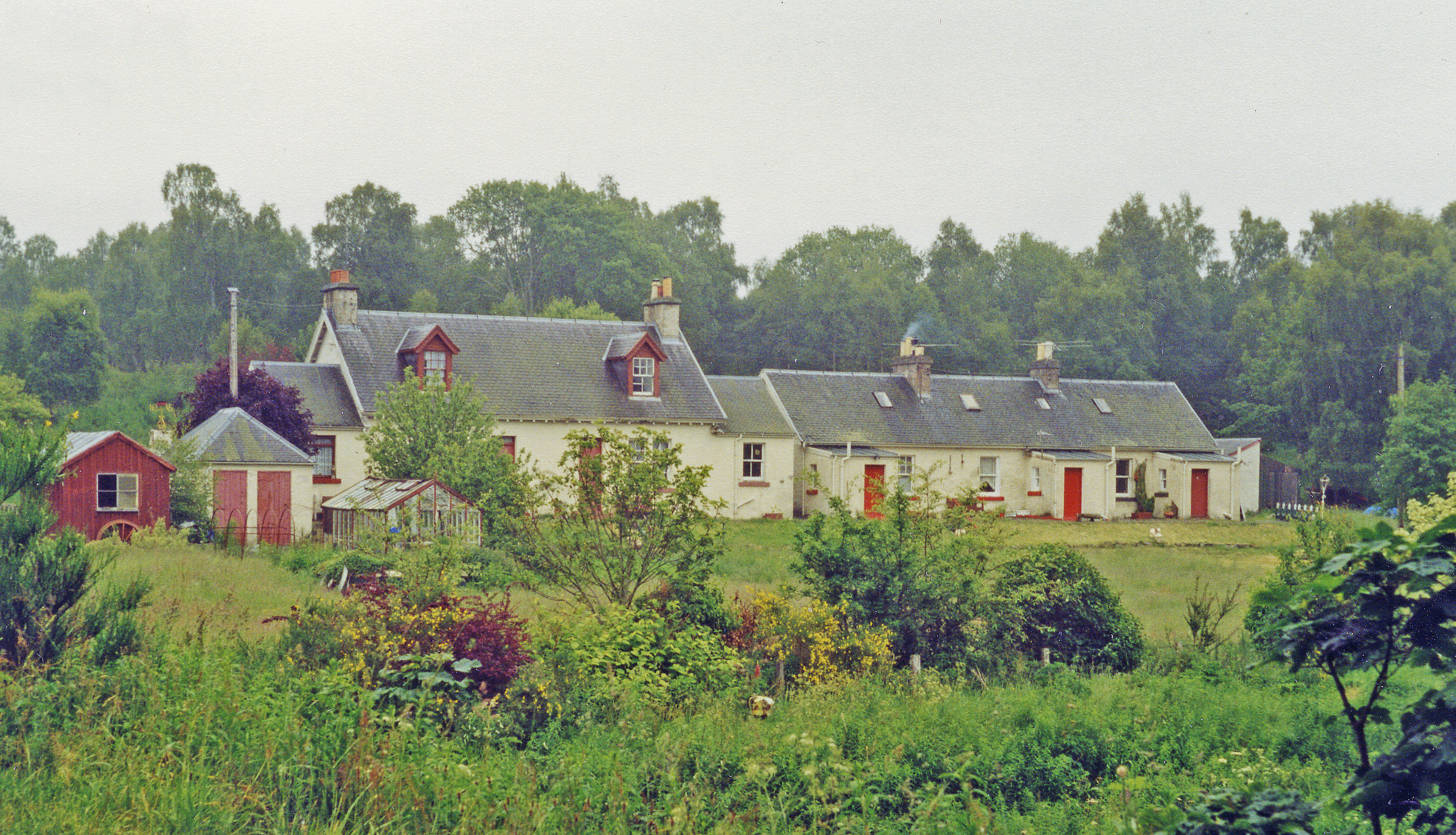
- Remains of the station in 1997

General information
- Location: Scotland
- Grid reference: NJ015481
- Platforms: 2

Other information
- Status: Disused

History
- Original company: Inverness and Perth Junction Railway
- Pre-grouping: Highland Railway
- Post-grouping: London, Midland & Scottish Railway

Key dates
- 3 August 1863: Opened
- 18 October 1965: Closed
Location

Dunphail railway station was opened with the Inverness and Perth Junction Railway in 1863.

== Station layout ==
The station layout was double platform (including passing loop) with a goods siding and loading platform. The station was controlled by a signal box at the north end. There was a standard Highland Railway overbridge connecting the platforms, also at the north end of the platforms.

== Goods siding ==
The goods siding was located north of the station platforms. There was a single loading platform located near to the A940.

== Station location ==
The station was located in sparsely populated farmland.

== Closure ==
Dunphail lost its goods service on 2 November 1964. The passenger service continued until complete closure on 18 October 1965 with the end of passenger services between Aviemore & Forres.

== Remains ==
The long platforms remain at either side of the track bed.

The goods siding platform and buffer stop remains. The buffer stop has recently been restored.

The station building, stationmaster's house still remain.

The overbridge and signal box have gone.

== Bustitution ==
No replacement bus services exist to Dunphail. This area is not served by public transport since the railway closed.

== Sources ==
- http://www.braemoray.com/edinkillie.htm - scroll down for some good images of the station during the days of operation.

Preceding station	Historical railways	Following station
Rafford; Line and Station closed	Inverness and Perth Junction Railway	Dava; Line and Station closed
