= Blanchland railway station =

Disused railway station in Blanchland, Northumberland

Blanchland

General information
- Location: Blanchland, Northumberland; England
- Coordinates: 54.7837°N 1.9968°W
- Grid reference: NZ003432
- Platforms: 1

Other information
- Status: Disused

History
- Original company: Stockton and Darlington Railway
- Pre-grouping: North Eastern Railway

Key dates
- 1 July 1845: Opened as Parkhead
- 1862: Closed to passengers
- 1 July 1923: Name changed to Blanchland
- 2 August 1965: Closed
Location

Blanchland railway station served the village of Blanchland, Northumberland, England, from 1845 to 1965 on the Stanhope and Tyne Railway.

== History ==
The station opened as Parkhead on 1 July 1845 by the Stockton and Darlington Railway. It was situated on the north side of a road east of the B6278. It opened as a goods station but there is evidence of passenger usage. It closed to passengers in 1862 but remained open for goods. Its name was changed to Blanchland on 1 July 1923. It closed to goods on 2 August 1965.

Preceding station	Historical railways	Following station
Waskerley; Line and station closed	Stanhope and Tyne Railway	High Stoop; Line and station closed
