= Port Edgar railway station =

Disused railway station in South Queensferry, Edinburgh

Coordinates: 55.9939°N 3.4162°W

Port Edgar

General information
- Location: South Queensferry, Edinburgh; Scotland
- Platforms: 1

Other information
- Status: Disused

History
- Original company: North British Railway

Key dates
- 2 September 1878: Opened
- 5 March 1890: Closed
Location

Port Edgar railway station served the town of South Queensferry, Scotland, from 1878 to 1890 on the Port Edgar Extension line.

== History ==
The station was opened on 2 September 1878 by the North British Railway. To the west was the signal box and a siding on the reverse side served North British Creosote Works to the east. The station closed on 5 March 1890.

Preceding station	Disused railways	Following station
New Halls; Line and station closed	North British Railway; Port Edgar extension line	Terminus
