= Parton railway station (Portpatrick and Wigtownshire Joint Railway) =

Disused railway station in Parton, Dumfries and Galloway

Parton
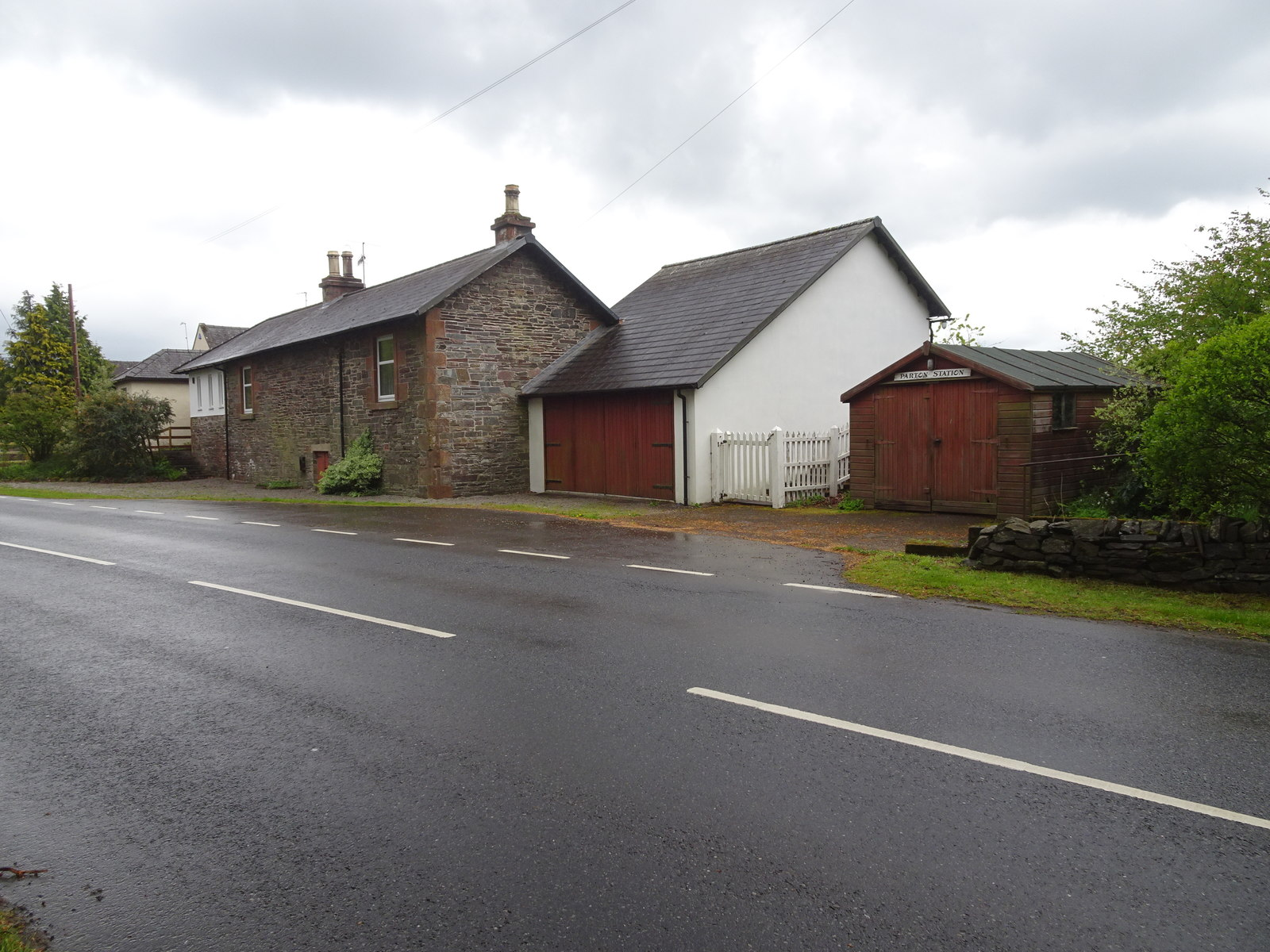
- The site of the station in 2019

General information
- Location: Parton, Dumfries and Galloway; Scotland
- Coordinates: 55.0083°N 4.0474°W
- Grid reference: NX691701

Other information
- Status: Disused

History
- Original company: Portpatrick Railway
- Pre-grouping: Portpatrick and Wigtownshire Joint Railway; Caledonian Railway
- Post-grouping: London, Midland and Scottish Railway British Rail (Scottish Region)

Key dates
- 12 March 1861: Opened
- 14 June 1965: Closed
Location

Parton railway station served the hamlet of Parton, in the historic county of Kirkcudbrightshire in the administrative area of Dumfries and Galloway, Scotland, from 1861 to 1965 on the Portpatrick and Wigtownshire Joint Railway.

== History ==
The station opened on 12 March 1861 by the Portpatrick and Wigtownshire Joint Railway. It closed to both passengers and goods traffic on 14 June 1965.

| Preceding station | Disused railways | Following station |
|---|---|---|
| Crossmichael; Line and station closed | Portpatrick and Wigtownshire Joint Railway | New Galloway; Line and station closed |
