= Park Lane Halt railway station =

Former railway station near Bickershaw, Lancashire, England

Park Lane Halt

General information
- Location: Bickershaw, Wigan; England
- Coordinates: 53.5023°N 2.5732°W
- Grid reference: SD620007
- Platforms: 2 (probable)

Other information
- Status: Disused

History
- Pre-grouping: Great Central Railway
- Post-grouping: LNER

Key dates
- 1923: Station opened
- 2 November 1964: Station closed to passengers
- 1952 <: Closed to freight
Location

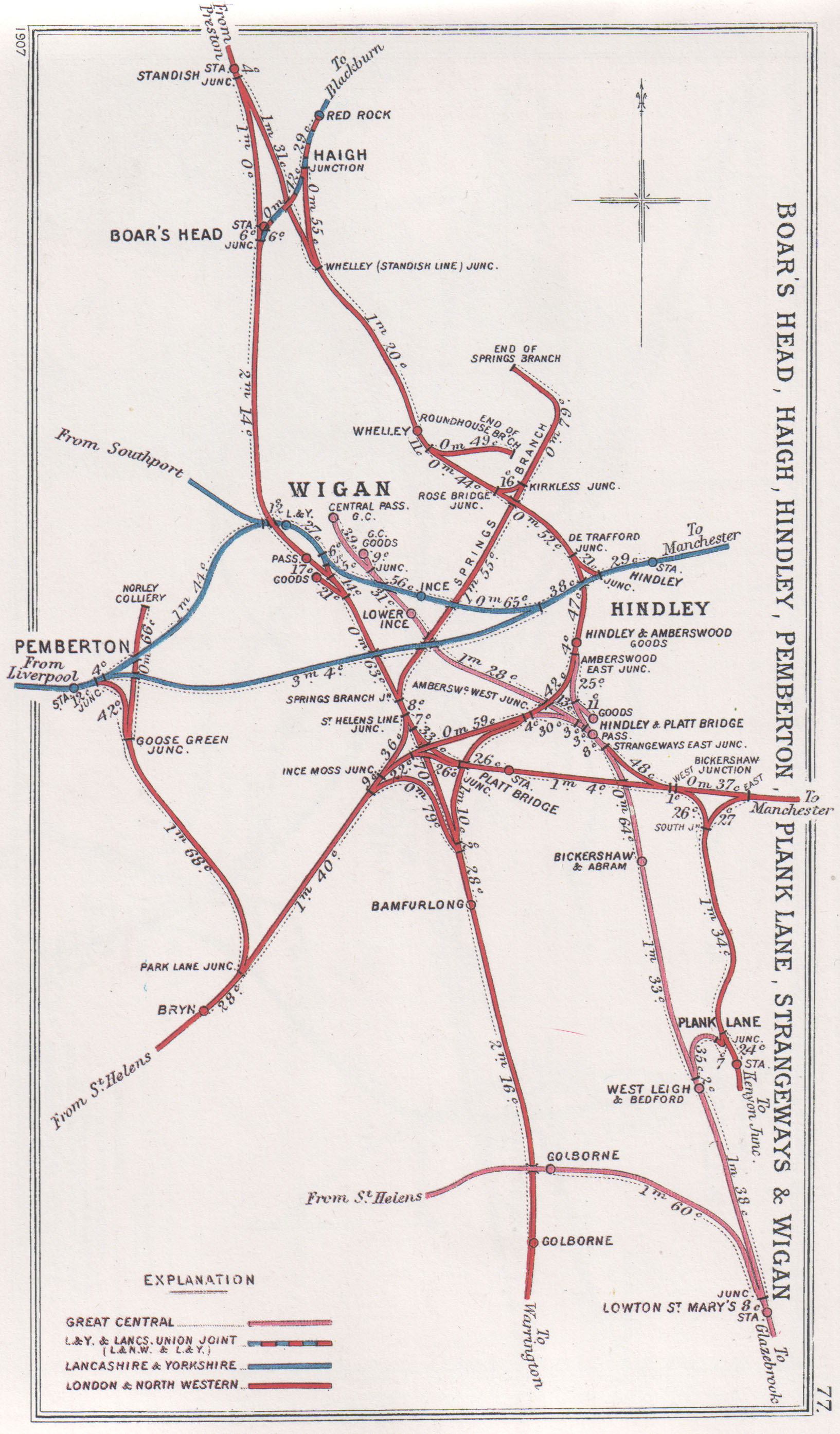
Map showing the area in the early 1900s

Park Lane Halt railway station was an unadvertised halt which served the communities of Bickershaw and Abram southeast of Wigan, England.

== Location and nearby stations ==
The station was on the Wigan Junction Railways line, known locally as the "Wigan Central line", which ran from Wigan Central to Glazebrook. It was situated immediately south of the level crossing by which Park Lane crossed the tracks. The word "Halt" in a station name usually implied that it was unstaffed.

== Services ==
The service patterns remain the subject of research. Authoritative printed and on line works on the route make no direct mention of the halt, though one does include an extract of a 1926 OS map on which the halt appears. It is possible that some service trains made unadvertised calls, but more likely that all 3rd Class unadvertised workmen's trains called. No published extracts from Bradshaw, nor the 1922 version makes any mention of the halt.

An image of a printed Great Central Railway ticket issued to a "Workman" from Park Lane Halt to Wigan Central has been published. This implies the halt was opened before 1 January 1923 when the Great Central ceased to exist as a separate entity.

The halt is named on OS maps between 1926 and 1952, not before and not after. This latest mention date does not confirm the halt was still open then.

== Opening, naming and closure ==
The line opened in 1884 and closed to passengers on 2 November 1964, closing completely in 1968. The track through the site of the halt was subsequently lifted.

== Afterlife ==
In 2015 the trackbed could be identified and Park Lane itself remained as an unmade private road and bridleway. No trace of the halt survived.

Preceding station	Disused railways	Following station
Bickershaw and Abram; Line and station closed	Great Central Railway; Wigan Junction Railways	West Leigh and Bedford; Line and station closed
