= Rafford railway station =

Former railway station in Scotland

Coordinates: 57.5837°N 3.5939°W

Rafford railway station at Rafford in Scotland was opened with the Inverness and Perth Junction Railway in 1863.

A full layout was provided (with a goods yard). The station was closed after only 2 years in operation.

== Station location ==
The station was located in a sparsely populated area, about a mile from the village of Rafford. The station was not a success and closed very early in the I&PJ history, in 1865.

It was also the place where the curve and incline to eventually meet with a gradient of 1-in-70, as the trains began to climb to Dava Muir. Locomotives often reversed before re-attempting at speed.

== After closure ==
The wooden station building was moved south, down the line to the I&PJ station at Aberfeldy. This was eventually replaced by a permanent structure and the Rafford building was lost. Aberfeldy was completely demolished after closure in 1965.

== Remains ==
There are no remains of the buildings/structures at the location of Rafford station. Some earthworks can be seen that indicate the layout of the platforms and goods loading platform. The path up to the station still exists and is used to access The Dava Way.

Over the road to Rafford, south of the station, an overbridge still exists with a Highland Railway fence post nearby. The embankments become very steep here, indicating the steady gradient, after leaving Rafford station.

== Sources ==
- 'The Highland Railway' - H.A Vallance
- Highland Railway: People and Places - From the Inverness and Nairn Railway to ScotRail - Neil T. Sinclair
- http://www.davaway.org.uk/maps/northern.html - link to the section of The Dava Way containing Rafford station site.

Preceding station	Historical railways	Following station
Forres; Line open; Connection to Inverness and Aberdeen Junction Railway closed	Inverness and Perth Junction Railway	Dunphail; Line and Station closed
