= Rainton railway station =

Short-lived railway station in West Rainton, County Durham

Rainton

General information
- Location: Rainton, County Durham; England
- Coordinates: 54.8222°N 1.5101°W
- Grid reference: NZ315475
- Platforms: 2

Other information
- Status: Disused

History
- Original company: Newcastle and Darlington Junction Railway
- Pre-grouping: Newcastle and Darlington Junction Railway

Key dates
- August 1844: Opened
- September 1844: Closed
Location

Rainton railway station briefly served the village of West Rainton, County Durham, England, in 1844 on the Leamside Line.

== History ==
The station opened in August 1844 by the Newcastle and Darlington Junction Railway. It was situated near Marks Lane bridge. It was a very short-lived railway station, only being open for one month before closing in September 1844.

Preceding station	Disused railways	Following station
Leamside; Line and station closed	Leamside Line; Newcastle and Darlington Junction Railway	Fencehouses; Line and station closed
