= Pantyffordd Halt railway station =

Disused railway station in Pant-y-ffordd, Flintshire

Pantyffordd

General information
- Location: Pant-y-ffordd, Glamorgan; Wales
- Coordinates: 51.7756°N 3.6978°W
- Grid reference: SN829099

Other information
- Status: Disused

History
- Original company: Great Western Railway

Key dates
- 2 September 1929: Opened
- 15 October 1962: Closed
Location

Pantyffordd Halt railway station served the area of Pant-y-ffordd, in the historical county of Glamorgan, Wales, from 1929 to 1962 on the Neath and Brecon Railway.

== History ==
The station was opened on 2 September 1929 by the Great Western Railway. It closed on 15 October 1962.

Preceding station	Historical railways	Following station
Onllwyn; Line open, station closed	Great Western Railway; Neath and Brecon Railway	Seven Sisters; Line open, station closed
