= Roundball Halt railway station =

Roundball Halt railway station was a second station serving Honiton, Devon (alongside the town's main station), although it was for private use. It was opened on 22 September 1906, and was about half a mile from the town station to allow soldiers to reach a rifle range at Roundball Hill, south west of the town centre. It was never advertised in timetables and was demolished early in 1921.

== Bibliography ==
- Quick, Michael (2023). Railway Passenger Stations in Great Britain: A Chronology (PDF) (5th ed.). London: Railway and Canal Historical Society.
