= Portswood railway station =

Disused railway station in Portswood, Hampshire

Portswood
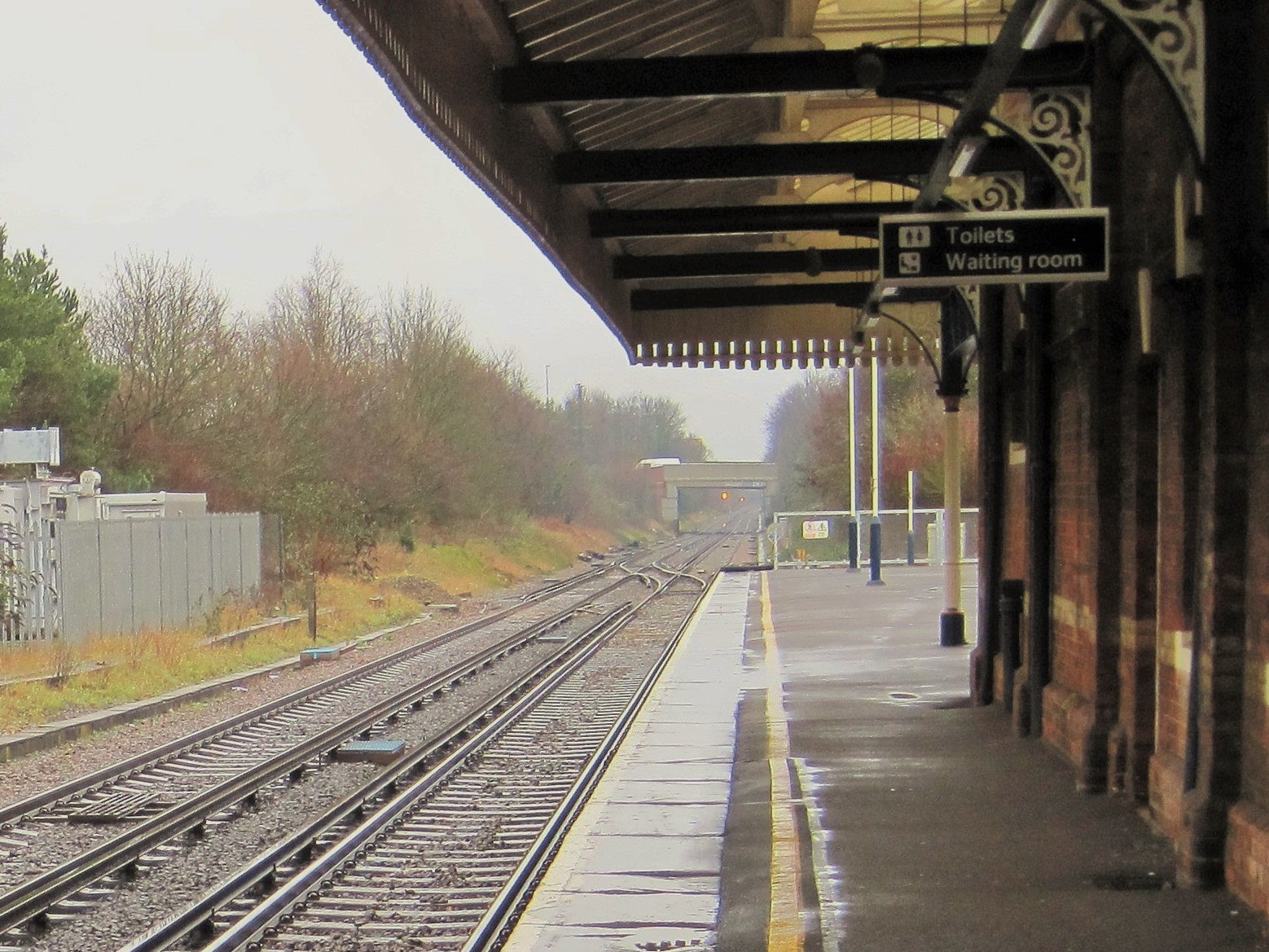
- The site of the station, looking north from St Denys, in 2015

General information
- Location: Portswood, Hampshire; England
- Coordinates: 50.92483°N 1.38644°W
- Grid reference: SU 4322 1411
- Platforms: 2

Other information
- Status: Disused

History
- Original company: LSWR
- Pre-grouping: LSWR

Key dates
- 1 May 1861: Opened
- 5 March 1866: Closed
Location

Portswood railway station served the suburb of Portswood, Hampshire, England from 1861 to 1866 on the South West Main Line.

== History ==
The station opened on 1 May 1861 by the London and South Western Railway. It was situated near the modern A3035 bridge, although it is unclear whether it was north or south of the bridge. The station closed on 5 March 1866 to make way for the new station that was opening 400 metres (1,300 ft) south, which is known as St Denys railway station nowadays. The station opened as Portswood and the name was changed to St Denys in 1876.

Preceding station	Historical railways	Following station
Swaythling; Line and station open	LSWR; South West Main Line	St Denys; Line and station open
