= Plas Power railway station (Wrexham and Minera Railway) =

Former railway station in Wales

Plas Power (WMR)

General information
- Location: Southsea, Wrexham; Wales
- Coordinates: 53.0573°N 3.0393°W
- Grid reference: SJ304515
- Platforms: 2

Other information
- Status: Disused

History
- Original company: Great Western Railway
- Pre-grouping: Great Western Railway
- Post-grouping: Great Western Railway

Key dates
- February 1883: Opened
- 1 January 1931: Closed to passengers
- 2 April 1956: Closed
Location

Plas Power (WMR) railway station was a station in Southsea, Wrexham, Wales. The station was opened in February 1883, closed to passengers on 1 January 1931 and closed completely on 2 April 1956.

Preceding station	Disused railways	Following station
The Lodge Halt; Line and station closed	Great Western Railway; Wrexham and Minera Railway	Wrexham General; Line closed, station open
