= Pentyrch railway station =

Disused railway station in Pentyrch, Cardiff

Pentyrch

General information
- Location: Pentyrch, Glamorgan; Wales
- Coordinates: 51.5234°N 3.2547°W
- Grid reference: ST130812

Other information
- Status: Disused

History
- Original company: Taff Vale Railway
- Pre-grouping: Taff Vale Railway

Key dates
- 9 October 1840: Opened
- 22 June 1863: Closed
Location

Pentyrch railway station served the village of Pentyrch, in the historical county of Glamorgan, Wales, from 1840 to 1863 on the Taff Vale Railway.

== History ==
The station was opened on 9 October 1840 by the Taff Vale Railway. It closed on 22 June 1863.

Preceding station	Disused railways	Following station
Taffs Well; Line and station closed	Taff Vale Railway	Llandaff; Line and station closed
