= Plasmarl railway station =

Disused railway station in Plasmarl, Swansea

Plasmarl

General information
- Location: Plasmarl, Glamorgan; Wales
- Coordinates: 51.6484°N 3.933°W
- Grid reference: SS663961

Other information
- Status: Disused

History
- Original company: Great Western Railway
- Pre-grouping: Great Western Railway
- Post-grouping: Great Western Railway

Key dates
- 9 May 1881: Opened
- 11 June 1956: Closed
Location

Plasmarl railway station served the suburb of Plasmarl, in the historical county of Glamorgan, Wales, from 1881 to 1956 on the Morriston branch.

== History ==
The station was opened on 9 May 1881 by the Great Western Railway. It temporarily closed on 9 May 1921 due to a coal strike but it reopened on 20 June. It closed permanently on 11 June 1956.

Preceding station	Disused railways	Following station
Landore Low Level; Line and station closed	Great Western Railway; Morriston branch	Copper Pit Platform; Line and station closed
