= Rushford railway station =

Short-lived railway station in Longsight, Greater Manchester

Rushford

General information
- Location: Longsight, Lancashire; England
- Coordinates: 53.4537°N 2.1991°W
- Grid reference: SJ868952

Other information
- Status: Disused

History
- Original company: Manchester and Birmingham Railway
- Pre-grouping: Manchester and Birmingham Railway

Key dates
- 4 June 1840: Opened
- 10 April 1843: Closed
Location

Rushford railway station served the area of Longsight, historically in Lancashire, England, from 1840 to 1843 on the Manchester and Birmingham Railway.

== History ==
The station was opened on 4 June 1840 by the Manchester and Birmingham Railway. It was a very short-lived railway station, only being open for under 3 years before closing on 10 April 1843. It was replaced by Longsight.
