= Pinmore railway station =

Disused railway station in Pinmore, South Ayrshire

Pinmore
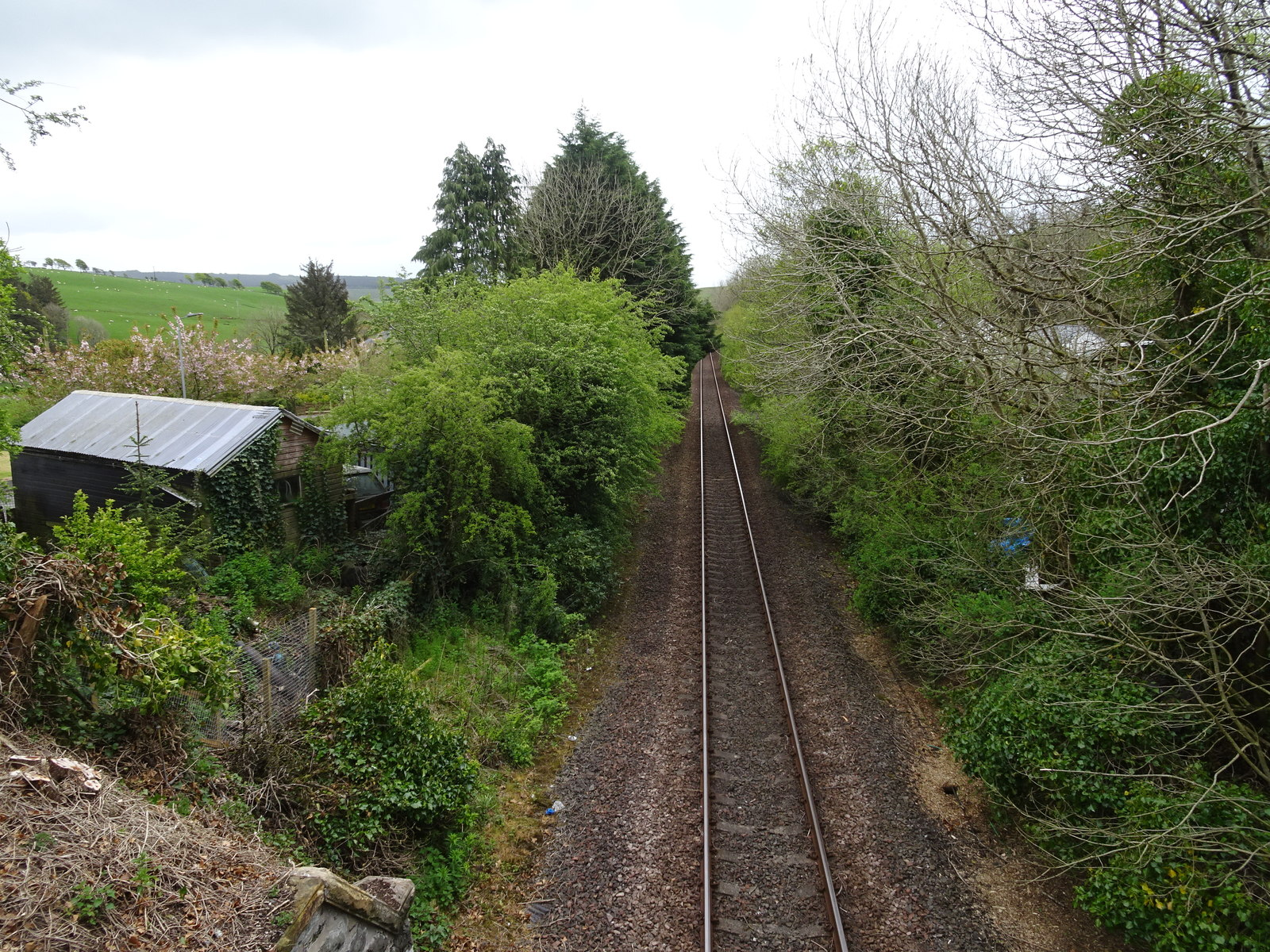
- The site of the station, looking south towards Pinwherry, in 2019

General information
- Location: Pinmore, South Ayrshire; Scotland
- Coordinates: 55.1894°N 4.8239°W
- Grid reference: NX203919
- Platforms: 1

Other information
- Status: Disused

History
- Original company: Girvan and Portpatrick Junction Railway
- Pre-grouping: Glasgow and South Western Railway
- Post-grouping: London, Midland and Scottish Railway; British Railways (Scottish Region)

Key dates
- 5 October 1877: Opened
- 7 February 1882: Closed
- 16 February 1882: Reopened
- 12 April 1886: Closed again
- 14 June 1886: Reopened
- 6 September 1965: Closed
Location

Pinmore railway station served the hamlet of Pinmore, South Ayrshire, Scotland from 1877 to 1965 on the Girvan and Portpatrick Junction Railway.

== History ==
The station opened on 5 October 1877 by the Girvan and Portpatrick Junction Railway. To the west was the goods yard and to the northeast was the signal box. The station closed on 7 February 1882 but reopened nine days later on 16 February 1882. It closed again on 12 April 1886, reopened on 14 June 1886 and finally closed on 6 September 1965.

The local folklore legend known as "The Charles" also is said to have visited the station in March 1886.

Preceding station	Historical railways	Following station
Girvan; Line and station open	Girvan and Portpatrick Junction Railway	Pinwherry; Line open, station closed
