= Plawsworth =

Village in County Durham, England

Coordinates: 54.825°N 1.591°W

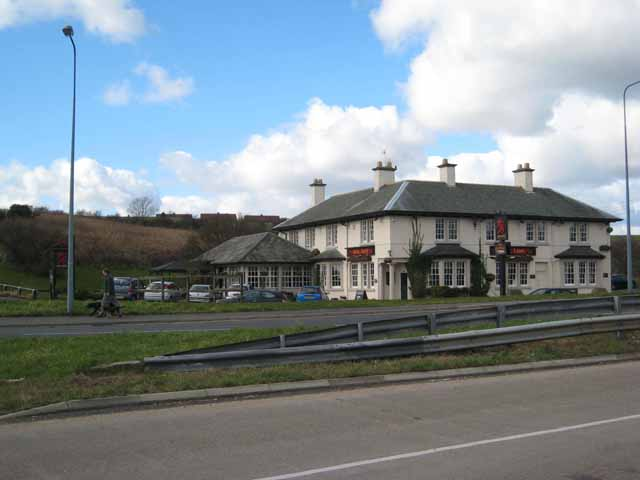
- The Red Lion, Plawsworth

- Location within County Durham
- OS grid reference: NZ263479
- Civil parish: Kimblesworth and Plawsworth
- Unitary authority: County Durham
- Ceremonial county: Durham
- Region: North East
- Country: England
- Sovereign state: United Kingdom
- Post town: CHESTER LE STREET
- Postcode district: DH2
- Dialling code: 0191
- Police: Durham
- Fire: County Durham and Darlington
- Ambulance: North East
- UK Parliament: North Durham

Plawsworth is a village and former civil parish, now in the parish of Kimblesworth and Plawsworth, in the County Durham district, in the ceremonial county of Durham, England. It is situated a short distance to the east of Sacriston, on the A167 between Durham and Chester-le-Street. In 1961 the parish had a population of 1570.

== Etymology ==
The name Plawsworth appears to be derived from the Old English for "games enclosure", from plega ("play, sport") + worð ("enclosure"). Or else, the first element may be a personal name *Plega, giving the name a meaning of "Plega's enclosure".

== Civil parish ==
Plawsworth was formerly a township in the parish of Chester-le-Street, from 1866 Plawsworth was a civil parish in its own right, on 1 April 1986 the parish was abolished added to the parish of "Kimblesworth & Plawsworth".
