= Pontycymmer railway station =

Disused railway station in Pontycymer, Bridgend

Pontycymer

General information
- Location: Pontycymer, Glamorganshire; Wales
- Coordinates: 51.610956°N 3.584734°W
- Platforms: 2

Other information
- Status: Disused

History
- Original company: Great Western Railway
- Pre-grouping: Great Western Railway
- Post-grouping: Great Western Railway

Key dates
- 1 June 1889: Opened to public
- 9 February 1953: Closed
Location

Pontycymmer railway station served the village of Pontycymer, in the historical county of Glamorganshire, Wales, from 1889 to 1953 on the Garw Valley Railway.

== History ==
The station was opened on 1 June 1889 by the Great Western Railway, although it was used earlier by miners in 1877. It was also shown earlier in Bradshaw, although the first train was shown in July 1889. It closed on 9 February 1953.

Preceding station	Disused railways	Following station
Blaengarw; Line and station closed	Great Western Railway; Garw Valley Railway	Pontyrhyl; Line and station closed
