= Pontyrhyl railway station =

Disused railway station in Pont-y-rhyl, Bridgend County Borough

Pontyrhyl

General information
- Location: Pont-y-rhyl, Glamorgan; Wales
- Coordinates: 51.5903°N 3.5777°W
- Grid reference: SS908891
- Platforms: 2

Other information
- Status: Disused

History
- Original company: Great Western Railway
- Post-grouping: Great Western Railway

Key dates
- 25 October 1886: Opened
- 9 February 1953: Closed
Location

Pontyrhyl railway station, also known as Pontrhyll railway station, served the village of Pont-y-rhyl, in the historical county of Glamorgan, Wales, from 1886 to 1953 on the Garw Valley Railway.

== History ==
The station was opened on 25 October 1886 by the Great Western Railway. It was first known as Pontyrhyll but it was changed in August 1887. It was also known as Pont-y-rhyll in the handbook of stations in 1899 but the hyphens were removed in 1904. The station closed on 9 February 1953. The track still exists and the station house is a private residence.

Preceding station	Disused railways	Following station
Pontycymmer; Line and station closed	Great Western Railway; Garw Valley Railway	Llangeinor; Line and station closed
