= Penar branch line =

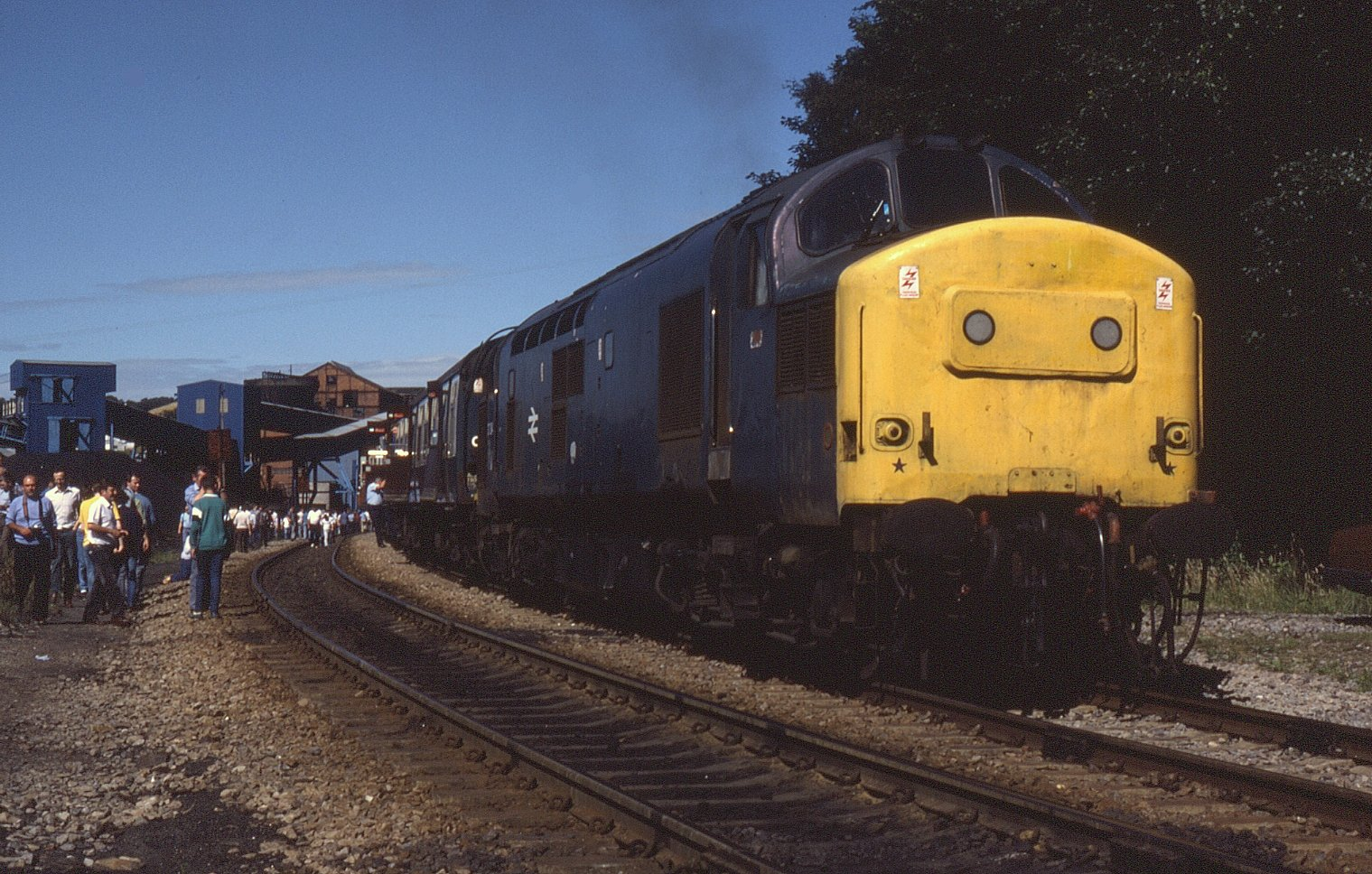
Train at Oakdale Colliery, 1987

The Penar branch line and the Hall's branch line, (also known as the Hall's Tramway and Hall's Road) was a standard gauge freight railway line running between Risca and the Oakdale Colliery in the South Wales coalfield. It finally closed when the colliery closed in 1989 but several sections of the trackbed, line and footbridges remain, around Crosskeys.

== History ==
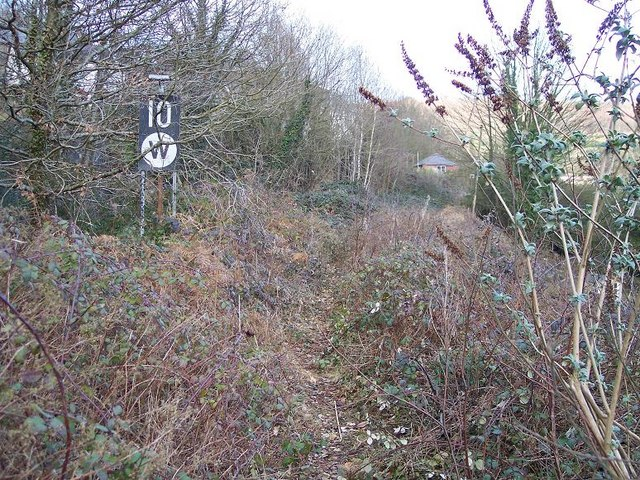
Overgrown railway trackbed of Hall's tramway

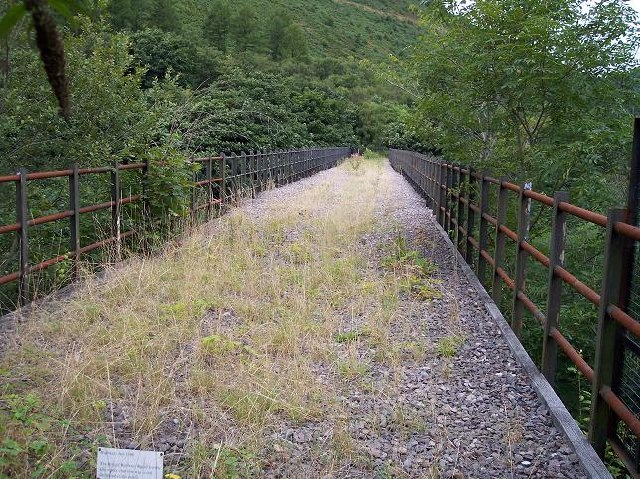
Viaduct built for Hall's tramway near Crosskeys

The line was originally built between 1808 and 1812 as a private tramway by Benjamin Hall, 1st Baron Llanover to connect mines he owned near Markham and Argoed in the Sirhowy Valley initially to Newbridge where it connected with the Crumlin Arm of the Monmouthshire and Brecon Canal, later probably extended to Risca.

At first the tramway was only 3 feet (0.9 m) wide and used horses drawing small wagons for the nine-mile (14.5 km) journey.

in 1876, the line was acquired by the Great Western Railway on a thousand-year lease.

== British Rail ==
For official purposes two different Engineer's Line Reference (ELR) codes were allocated to the line by British Rail. The section from Halls Road Junction (at Lime Kiln Junction, Crosskeys) to Penar Junction was denoted HRD (for Halls Road branch); while the section from Penar Junction to Oakdale Colliery (Colliers Arms) was PEN (for Penar branch). The line west of Penar tunnel (= railway spelling) made a junction with the Vale of Neath line (VON) at Penar Junction.

In December 1967, due to rationalisation of the railway network, the Halls Road branch was taken out of use for a period and the closed Vale of Neath line was brought back into use between Penar Junction and Bird-in-Hand West to join the former LMS Sirhowy line to Nine Mile Point via Tredegar Junction Lower and Wyllie. For that journey, a run around siding had to be established on the barren VON formation at Penar Junction for the locomotive to run around its train for forward journey to Oakdale or return journey to Newport.

When the former LMS branch to the Sirhowy Valley from Nine Mile Point closed, the Halls Road section was reopened in May 1970 until closure of both the Halls Road and the Penar branches after 1989.
