= Pinwherry railway station =

Disused railway station in Pinwherry, South Ayrshire

Pinwherry
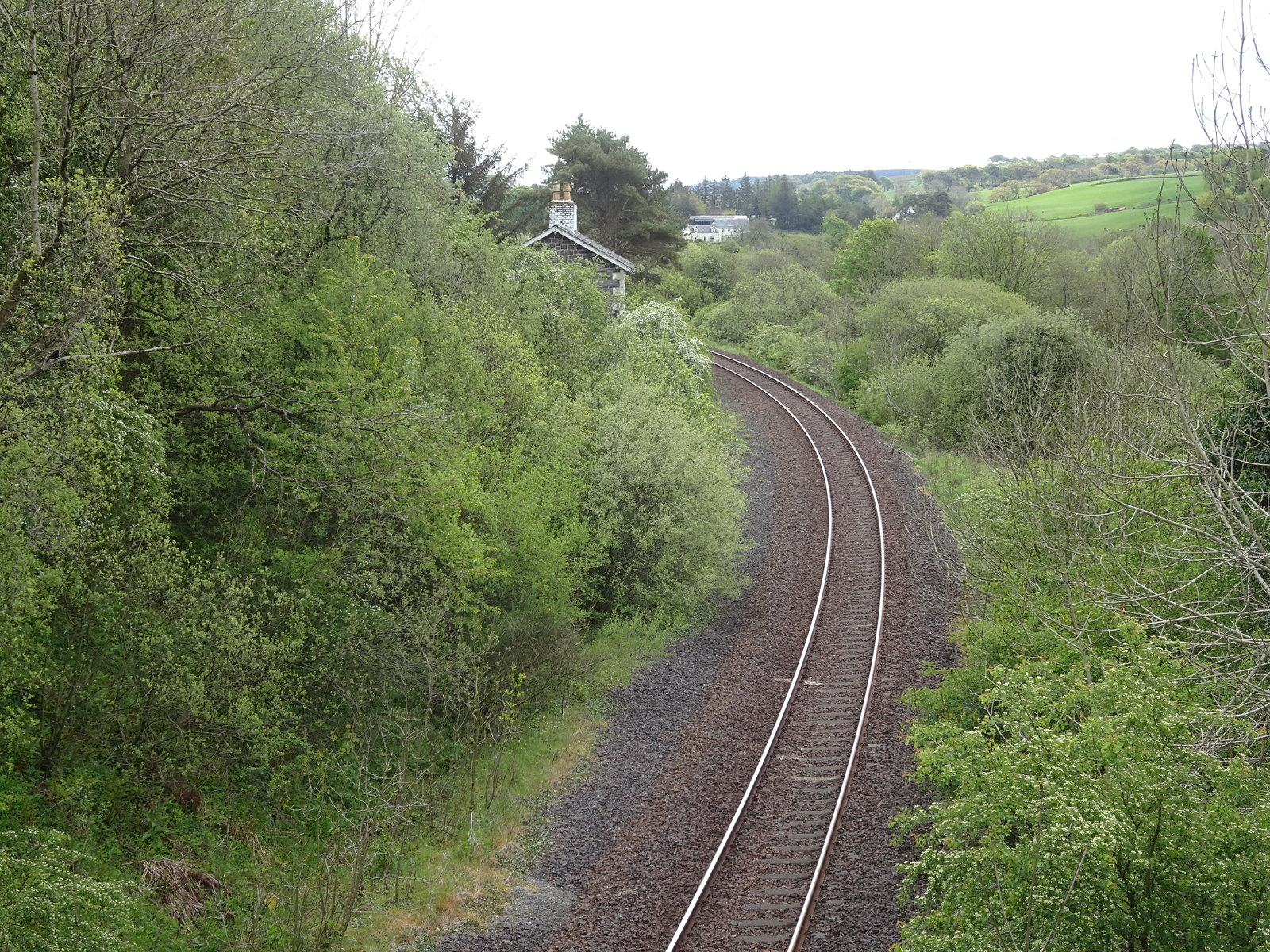
- The site of the station, looking southeast to Barrhill, in 2019

General information
- Location: Pinwherry, South Ayrshire; Scotland
- Coordinates: 55.1465°N 4.8352°W
- Grid reference: NX194872
- Platforms: 2

Other information
- Status: Disused

History
- Original company: Girvan and Portpatrick Junction Railway
- Pre-grouping: Glasgow and South Western Railway
- Post-grouping: London, Midland and Scottish Railway; British Railways (Scottish Region)

Key dates
- 5 October 1877: Opened
- 7 February 1882: Closed
- 16 February 1882: Reopened
- 12 April 1886: Closed again
- 14 June 1886: Reopened
- 6 September 1965: Closed
Location

Pinwherry railway station served the village of Pinwherry, South Ayrshire, Scotland from 1887 to 1965 on the Girvan and Portpatrick Junction Railway.

== History ==
The station opened on 5 October 1877 by the Girvan and Portpatrick Junction Railway. To the southwest was the signal box and to the south were the goods yard and the goods shed. The station closed on 7 February 1882 but reopened nine days later on 16 February 1882. It closed again on 12 April 1886, reopened on 14 June 1886 and finally closed on 6 September 1965. The signal box closed in 1992.

| Preceding station | Historical railways | Following station |
|---|---|---|
| Pinmore; Line open, station closed | Girvan and Portpatrick Junction Railway | Barrhill; Line and station open |
