= Roman Road railway station (Yorkshire) =

Disused railway station in West Yorkshire, England

Coordinates: 53.790°N 1.348°W

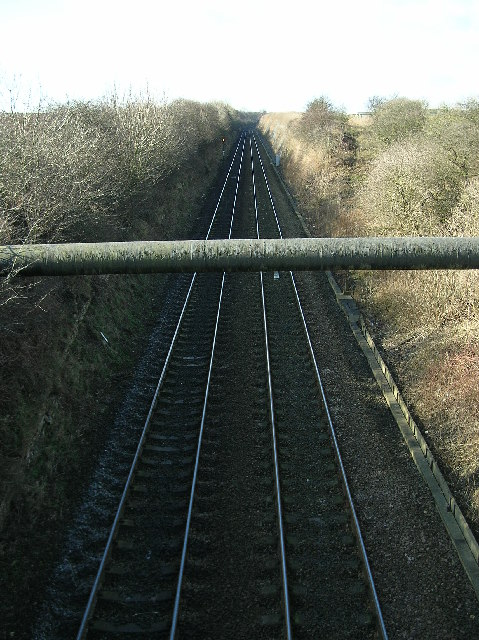
Approximate location of the former Roman Road station, looking west from the bridge of the A656 which follows the course of an ancient road

Roman Road railway station was a station on the Leeds and Selby Railway, near Micklefield, in West Yorkshire, England. The station was one of the shortest lived stations in the United Kingdom opening on 22 September 1834 and closing less than two months later on 10 November 1834.

The opening of the station coincided with the opening of the line but on 31 October 1834 the directors of the company "Ordered stopping places at Cross Gates and Roman Road be abandoned from 8th November next."

The fares from Roman Road to Selby were 2/-shillings, firstclass, and 1/- second class. Fares to Leeds were 6d dearer at 2/6 and 1/6 respectively.
