= Abercynon North railway station =

Former railway station in Abercynon, Wales

Abercynon North Welsh: Gogledd Abercynon

General information
- Location: Abercynon, Rhondda Cynon Taff; Wales
- Coordinates: 51.64509°N 3.32709°W
- Grid reference: ST082948
- Line: Merthyr Line
- Platforms: 1

Other information
- Status: Closed

History
- Original company: British Rail

Key dates
- 3 October 1988: Station opens
- 2008: Station closed – Services moved to Abercynon

Passengers
- 2004/05: 0.112 million
- 2005/06: 0.114 million
- 2006/07: 0.123 million
- 2007/08: 0.128 million
Location
Notes
- Passenger statistics from the Office of Rail and Road

Abercynon North railway station was one of two railway stations, North and South, serving the village of Abercynon in the Cynon Valley, Wales. It was located on the Aberdare branch of the Merthyr Line 15¼ miles (24 km) north of Cardiff Central. Passenger services were provided by Arriva Trains Wales.

== History ==
The station was opened by the British Railways Board on 3 October, 1988. It was constructed to allow the Aberdare line to serve Abercynon village, as the track layout in use at the time at the original station did not allow Aberdare services to call there.

In November 2007, a proposal was submitted by the Welsh Assembly Government to discontinue all services provided at this station. From a date "no sooner than 1st May 2008" as the notice runs, all services were to be transferred to Abercynon South, which will be rebuilt to accommodate all services serving both stations.

At the end of May 2008, the island platform was reinstated at Abercynon South and the North station closed.

== Services ==
=== Autumn 2007 ===
Abercynon North was served by a train every 30 minutes in each direction, weekday daytimes, calling at almost all stations between Aberdare and Barry Island via Llandaf.

Preceding station	Historical railways	Following station
Pontypridd	Arriva Trains Wales; Merthyr Line	Penrhiwceiber
