= Ferrer =

Ferrer may refer to:

== Generic ==
- Ferrer (surname)

== People surnamed Ferrer or de Ferrer ==
- Ada Ferrer (born 1962), American historian
- Albert Ferrer (born 1970), Spanish footballer
- Aldo Ferrer (1927–2016), Argentine economist
- Alex Ferrer, judge in the courtroom television show Judge Alex
- Aurelia Ferrer (1880–1963), Argentine film actress
- Barbara Ferrer, American heath executive and director of the Los Angeles County Department of Public Health
- Concepció Ferrer (born 1938), Spanish academic and politician
- Danay Ferrer (born 1974)
- David Ferrer (born 1982), Spanish tennis player
- Darien Ferrer (born 1983), Cuban volleyball player
- Dennis Ferrer, American music producer and DJ
- Eduardo Blasco Ferrer (1956–2017), Spanish-born specialist in the Sardinian language
- Fernando Ferrer (born 1950), American politician
- Francesc Ferrer i Guàrdia (1859–1909), Catalan educator, anarchist, and free-thinker who founded the Escuela Moderna
- Frank Ferrer, American rock drummer and session musician
- Héctor Altuve Ferrer
- Horacio Ferrer (1933–2014) Uruguayan-Argentine poet, broadcaster, reciter and tango lyricist
- Ibrahim Ferrer (1927–2005), Cuban musician, Buena Vista Social Club
- Jaume Ferrer, (fl. 1346), Majorcan sailor who explored the West African coast
- Javier Justiz Ferrer (born 1992), Cuban basketball player
- Jorge Ferrer, author
- José A. Ferrer (born 2000), Dominican baseball player
- José Ferrer (1909–1992), Puerto Rican actor and film director
- José Ferrer (guitarist) (1835–1916), Spanish guitarist and composer
- Josep Ferrer i Bujons (born 1959), Catalan writer, poet, and linguist
- José Ferrer Selma (born 1950), Spanish footballer
- José Figueres Ferrer (1906–1990), three-time President of Costa Rica
- José Joaquín de Ferrer (1763-1818), Spanish astronomer
- Julio Ferrer (1953–2022), Puerto Rican Olympic sprinter
- Kevin Ferrer (born 1993), Filipino basketball player
- Llorenç Serra Ferrer (born 1953), Spanish football manager
- Luis Ladaria Ferrer (born 1944), Spanish prelate, Vatican official
- Lupita Ferrer (born 1947), Venezuelan telenovela actress
- Manuel Y. Ferrer, American guitarist
- Maria Teresa Ferrer i Mallol (1940-2017), Catalan historian
- Marina Ferrer, fictional character of The L Word
- Mel Ferrer (1917–2008), American actor, film director, and film producer
- Mercedes Ferrer (born 1963), Spanish singer-songwriter
- Miguel Ferrer (disambiguation)
  - Miguel Ferrer (1955–2017), Puerto Rican-American actor
  - Miguel Ángel Ferrer Deheza (1915–1989), Argentine lawyer
- Miriam Coronel-Ferrer, Filipino peace negotiator
- Nino Ferrer (1934–1998), French-Italian singer, actor, and jazz musician
- Pepita Ferrer Lucas (1938–1993), Spanish chess master
- Renée Ferrer de Arréllaga (born 1944), Paraguayan poet and novelist
- Rubén Ferrer (born 1975), Argentine footballer
- Séverine Ferrer (born 1977), French singer
- Sonia Ferrer (born 1977), Spanish model and TV presenter
- Suzi Ferrer (1940–2006) US/Puerto Rican visual artist and feminist
- Thays Ferrer (born 1999), Brazilian women's footballer
- Tony Ferrer (1934-2021), Filipino actor, film director, and producer
- Valentina Ferrer (born 1993), Argentine model
- Vincent Ferrer (1350–1419), Valencian Dominican missionary and Roman Catholic saint
- Wilfredo Ferrer (born 1962), Venezuelan hurdler
- Ysa Ferrer (born 1972), Algerian-born French actress and singer

== Places ==
- Church of St. Vincent Ferrer (New York)
- Misión San Vicente Ferrer
- Two parishes in Brazil called São Vicente Ferrer (Portuguese for Saint Vincent Ferrer):
  - São Vicente Ferrer, Pernambuco
  - São Vicente Ferrer, Maranhão

== Other ==
- Ferrer Schools, or Modern Schools, socially progressive American schools formed in the early 20th century after the model of Francisco Ferrer's Escuela Moderna

== See also ==
- Christy Ferer, U.S. philanthropist
- Ferr
- Ferrero (disambiguation)
- Ferrers (disambiguation)
- Ferrier (disambiguation)
- Fer (disambiguation)
