= Abercwmboi Halt railway station =

Disused railway station in Abercwmboi, Wales

Coordinates: 51.68796°N 3.39940°W

Abercwmboi Halt

General information
- Location: Abercwmboi, Rhondda Cynon Taf; Wales
- Platforms: 2

Other information
- Status: Disused

History
- Original company: Taff Vale Railway
- Pre-grouping: Taff Vale Railway
- Post-grouping: Great Western Railway

Key dates
- 26 December 1904: Station opens as Duffryn Crossing Platform
- February 1906: Station renamed Abercwmboi Platform
- 2 October 1922: Station renamed Abercwmboi Halt
- 2 April 1956: Station closes
Location

Abercwmboi Halt railway station served the village of Abercwmboi in historic Glamorganshire, Wales. Opened as Duffryn Crossing Platform by the Taff Vale Railway, it became part of the Great Western Railway during the Grouping of 1923. Passing to the Western Region of British Railways on nationalisation in 1948, it was then closed by the British Transport Commission.

== The site today ==
Trains on the reopened Aberdare Line pass the site between Fernhill and Cwmbach stations, although there is no station at Abercwmboi now.

Preceding station	Disused railways	Following station
Fernhill	Taff Vale Railway	Cwmneol Halt
Fernhill	Taff Vale Railway	Cwmbach
