= Mountain Ash railway station =

Railway station in Rhondda Cynon Taf, Wales

Mountain Ash Welsh: Aberpennar
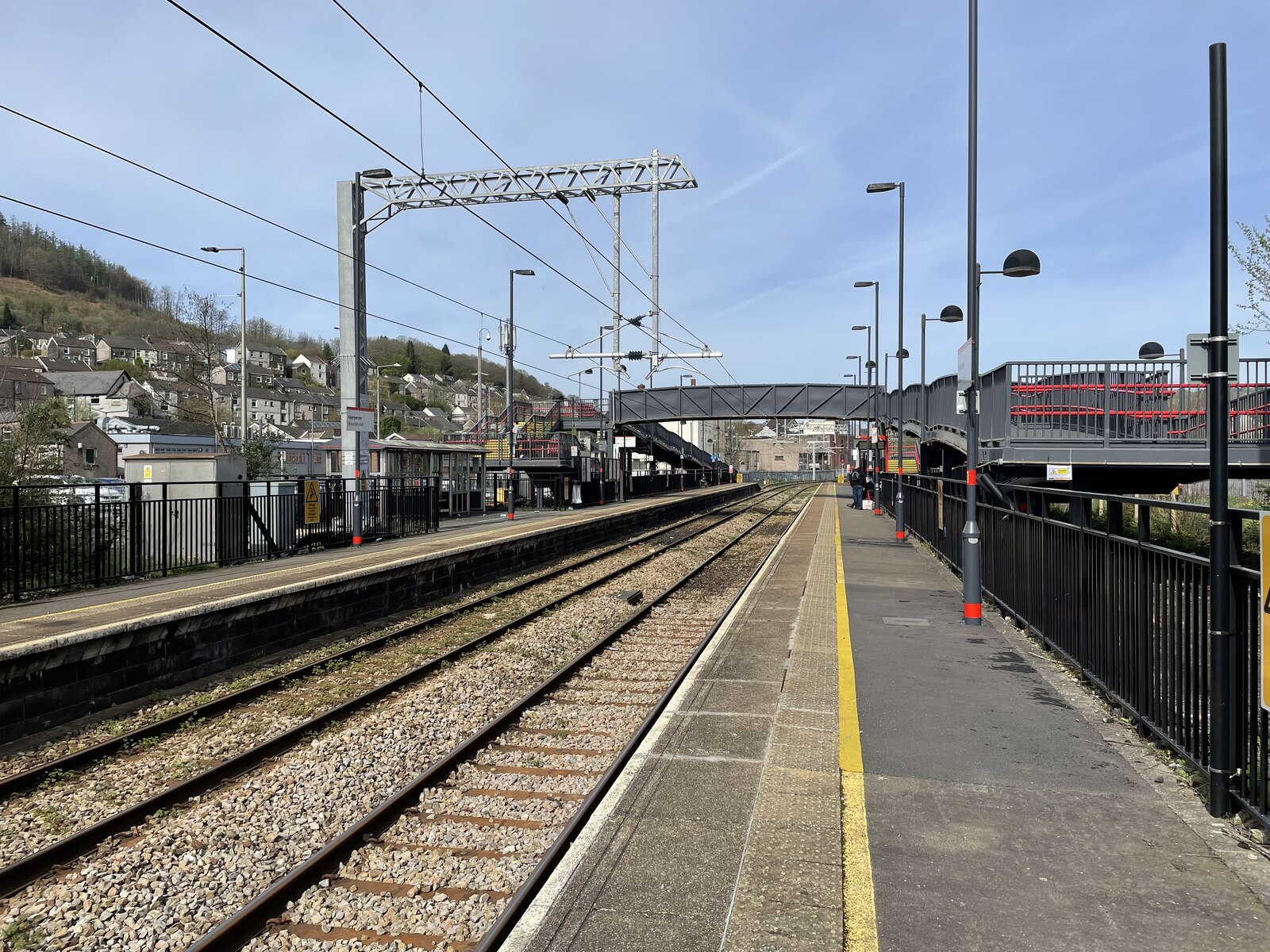

General information
- Location: Mountain Ash, Rhondda Cynon Taf; Wales
- Coordinates: 51°40′54″N 3°22′35″W
- Grid reference: ST049989
- Managed by: Transport for Wales
- Platforms: 2

Other information
- Station code: MTA
- Classification: DfT category F2

Key dates
- 3 October 1988: Station opened

Passengers
- 2020/21: ▼15,536
- 2021/22: ▲63,076
- 2022/23: ▲78,268
- 2023/24: ▲95,714
- 2024/25: ▲0.131 million
Location
Notes
- Passenger statistics from the Office of Rail and Road

Mountain Ash railway station (Welsh: Gorsaf Reilffordd Aberpennar) serves the town of Mountain Ash in Rhondda Cynon Taf, Wales. It is located on the Aberdare branch of the Merthyr Line and on the banks of the Afon Cynon, a major river in the town. Services are provided by Transport for Wales and run to all Valley Lines destinations.

== History ==
A station serving this area of the town was first opened at Oxford Street by the Taff Vale Railway in 1888. This was closed to passengers by the Western Region of British Railways in 1964. Passenger services were reinstated to a new station by British Rail in 1988. There is a passing loop situated here, which was constructed in 2002, when the station was also rebuilt; it enables half-hourly services and freight trains to operate alongside the passenger service on what is otherwise a single track route.

== Services ==
There is a half-hourly service in each direction on Mondays to Saturdays: northbound to Aberdare and southbound to Cardiff Central and Merthyr Tydfil. This drops to hourly in the evenings.

On Sundays, there is an hourly service between Aberdare and Cardiff Central. The increase in the Sunday service frequency is due to a campaign by the local Assembly Member and a successful trial in December 2017; the extra services began in April 2018.

Preceding station	National Rail	Following station
Penrhiwceiber	Transport for Wales; Aberdare Branch	Fernhill
