= FER =

FER or Fer may refer to:

== Grapes ==
- Fer, a French red-wine grape
- Gros Verdot, a French red-wine grape

== Languages ==
- Fer language, a Nilo-Saharan language
- Kaligi language, a Ubangian language

== People ==
- Fer (name), including people with that name

== Science ==
- FER (gene)
- Fer (insect), a genus of grasshopper in the Catantopina
- FERONIA, a kinase

== Other ==
- Fer Publishing, an imprint of VDM Publishing
- County Fermanagh, Northern Ireland (Chapman code)
- Faculty of Electrical Engineering and Computing (Croatian: Fakultet elektrotehnike i računarstva) of the University of Zagreb
- Far Eastern Republic, an historical state, existing from 1920 to 1922 during the Russian Civil War
- Fernhill railway station, in Wales
- Ferrovie Emilia Romagna, an Italian transport-company
- Left Revolutionary Front (Portugal) (Portuguese: Frente da Esquerda Revolucionária)
- New Spirit Party (Albanian: Partia Fryma e Re), a political party in Kosovo
- Ferrovial (BMAD ticker FER)
