= Penrhiwceiber railway station =

Railway station in Rhondda Cynon Taf, Wales

Penrhiwceiber Welsh: Penrhiw-ceibr
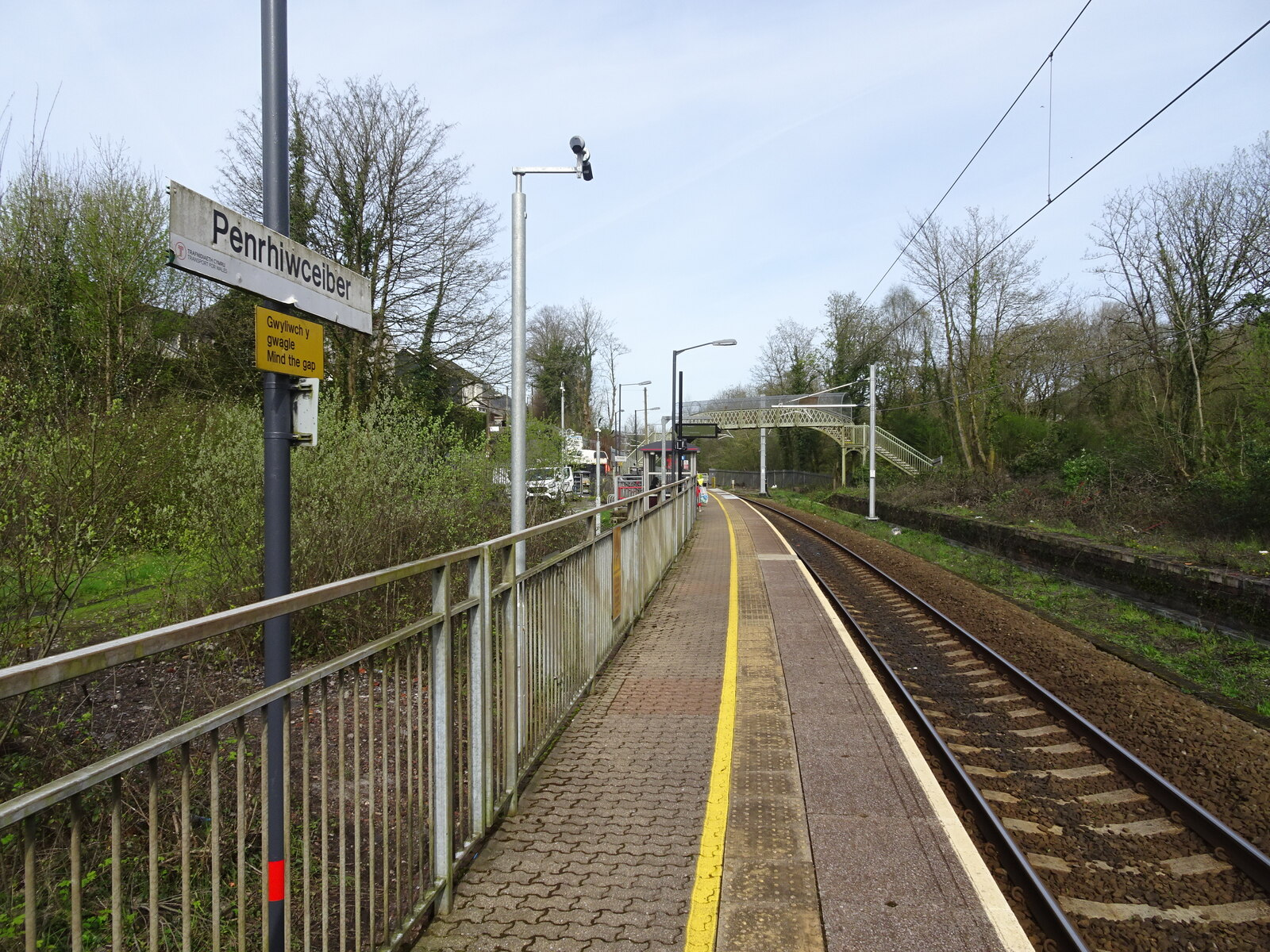

General information
- Location: Penrhiwceiber, Rhondda Cynon Taf; Wales
- Coordinates: 51°40′13″N 3°21′36″W
- Grid reference: ST060977
- Manager: Transport for Wales
- Platforms: 1

Other information
- Station code: PER
- Classification: DfT category F2

Key dates
- 1 June 1883: Station opens
- 1 July 1924: Renamed Penhrhiwceiber Low Level
- September 1964: Station closes
- 3 October 1988: Reopened as Penrhiwceiber

Passengers
- 2021/22: ▲26,140
- 2022/23: ▲31,918
- 2023/24: ▲32,674
- 2024/25: ▲46,492
- 2025/26: ▲55,842
Location
Notes
- Passenger statistics from the Office of Rail and Road

Penrhiwceiber railway station (Welsh: Gorsaf Reilffordd Penrhiwceibr) serves the village of Penrhiwceiber, Rhondda Cynon Taf, Wales. It is located on the Aberdare branch of the Merthyr Line between the town of Mountain Ash and the village of Abercynon. Passenger services are provided by Transport for Wales.

== History ==
A station at this location was first opened by the Taff Vale Railway on 1 June 1883, and was originally named Penrhiwceiber; it was renamed Penrhiwceiber Low Level by the Great Western Railway on 1 July 1924. It was closed by the Western Region of British Railways on 16 March 1964 and a new station, named Penrhiwceiber, provided for reopening of the branch to passengers on 3 October 1988.

== Services ==
There is a half-hourly service in each direction on Mondays to Saturdays: northbound to Aberdare and southbound to Cardiff Central and Merthyr Tydfil. This drops to hourly in the evenings.

On Sundays, there is an hourly service between Aberdare and Cardiff Central. The increase in the Sunday service frequency is due to a campaign by the local Assembly Member and a successful trial in December 2017; the extra services began in April 2018.

Preceding station	National Rail	Following station
Abercynon	Transport for Wales; Aberdare Branch	Mountain Ash
