= CMH =

CMH may refer to:

- The IATA code for John Glenn Columbus International Airport in Columbus, Ohio
- The National Rail station code for Cwmbach railway station in Rhondda Cynon Taf, Wales
- CMH Records
- Cambridge Military Hospital
- Canadian Mountain Holidays
- Canadian Museum of History
- United States Army Center of Military History
- Central Middlesex Hospital
- Ceramic discharge metal-halide lamp
- Children's Memorial Hospital
- Children's Museum of Houston
- Cohen Modal Haplotype
- Combined Military Hospital
- Combined Military Hospital (Dhaka)
- Community mental health
- Congressional Medal of Honor
- Consolidated Media Holdings
- Creatine monohydrate
- Cochran–Mantel–Haenszel statistics
