= Feronia =

Feronia may mean:

- Feronia (mythology), a goddess of fertility in Roman and Etruscan mythology
- Feronia (plant), a genus of plants
- Feronia Inc., a plantations company operating in the Democratic Republic of the Congo
- Feronia (Sardinia), a mysterious ancient site in Sardinia, Italy
- Feronia (Etruria), a city in ancient Etruria, Italy
- 72 Feronia, an asteroid
- FERONIA, a recognition receptor kinase found in plants
