= Abercynon railway station =

Railway station in the Cynon Valley, Wales

Abercynon
- The station in May 2022

General information
- Location: Abercynon, Rhondda Cynon Taf; Wales
- Coordinates: 51.6431°N 3.3294°W
- Grid reference: ST082948
- Manager: Transport for Wales
- Platforms: 2

Other information
- Station code: ACY
- Classification: DfT category F1

Key dates
- 9 October 1840: Station opens as Navigation House
- June 1849: Renamed Aberdare Junction
- 1 December 1896: Renamed Abercynon
- 1988: Renamed Abercynon South upon opening of Abercynon North
- 2008: Renamed Abercynon upon merger with Abercynon North

Passengers
- 2020/21: ▼33,006
- Interchange: ▼1,887
- 2021/22: ▲0.105 million
- Interchange: ▲11,592
- 2022/23: ▲0.135 million
- Interchange: ▲15,581
- 2023/24: ▲0.145 million
- Interchange: ▼15,129
- 2024/25: ▲0.190 million
- Interchange: ▲19,118
Location
Notes
- Passenger statistics from the Office of Rail and Road

Abercynon railway station serves the village of Abercynon in the Cynon Valley, Wales. It is located on the Merthyr Line, between Quakers Yard to the north, Penrhiwceiber to the northwest, and Pontypridd to the south. It is sited 16 miles 26 chains (26.3 km) from Cardiff Docks (Bute Town).

== History ==
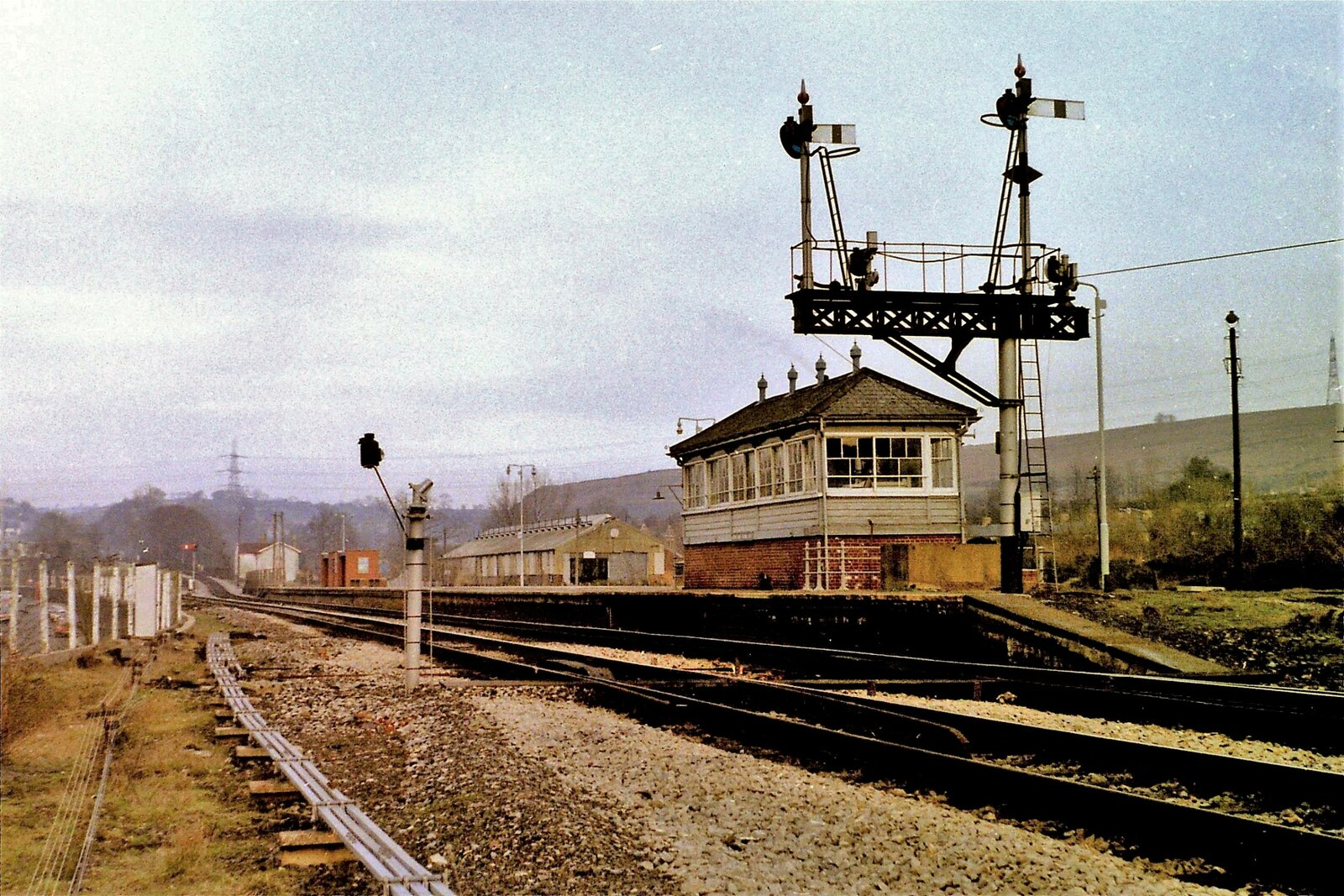
Abercynon, before being renamed Abercynon South, in 1984

The station was first opened on this site as Navigation House on 8 October 1840 and was then renamed Aberdare Junction by the Taff Vale Railway in June 1849. It was further renamed Abercynon on 1 December 1896 and to Abercynon South - upon the opening of Abercynon North - in 1988.

The original station buildings, including the Great Western Railway signal box of 1932 which originally came from Birmingham Moor Street station, have been demolished.

In November 2007, a proposal was submitted by the Welsh Assembly Government to discontinue all services provided at Abercynon North. All services were to be transferred to Abercynon South, which would be rebuilt (with the reinstatement of the disused up side of the island platform) to accommodate all services serving both stations. Following the closure of Abercynon North, the station's name reverted to simply Abercynon.

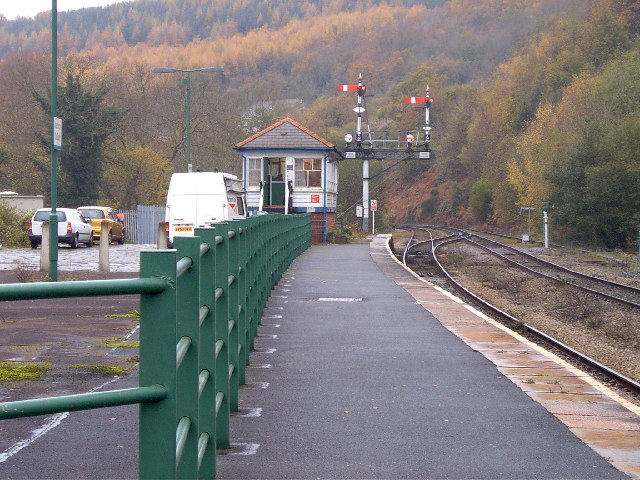
Abercynon station, before the merger with Abercynon North and the subsequent rebuilding of the station

On 14 December 2010, a free Park and Ride car park opened on the site of the station yard, with capacity for 160 cars. It was hoped to improve commuter travel to Cardiff and other areas on the Valley Lines network. This was funded by the Welsh Assembly Government and the European Regional Development Fund.

On 26 and 27 April 2012, the British Royal Train visited the station as part of the tour of the Diamond Jubilee of Elizabeth II.

On 21 February 2015, a blue plaque was unveiled at the station entrance to mark the location of trade unionist John Ewington's workplace. His claim against his employer, the Taff Vale Railway Company for unfair treatment led to the famous Taff Vale Case which was fundamental in the creation of the Labour Party.

=== South Wales Metro transformation ===
In February 2016, work started at the station to improve the facilities ahead of the South Wales Metro system. Work included the installation of an extra shelter and a bike shelter where the old signal box stood. Transport for Wales replaced an existing shelter with a larger one, including TfW branding, in spring 2019.

In December 2017, Rhondda Cynon Taff funded the expansion of the car park to increase the number of spaces for users. There are future plans to further increase the number of spaces which is a reflection of the popularity of the site for commuters. In April 2019, Rhondda Cynon Taf council opened a further extension to the car park. An extra 310 spaces have been built in the nearby Navigation Park to cater for future increase in demand. Other work included adapting the footpath to the station and adding a bus stop in the existing car park. The council also installed signs at both entrances explaining the history of Abercynon and its transport history. The project was funded by the Welsh Government.

In October 2018, it was announced that the South Wales Metro would receive £119 million from the European Union. Some of this money is earmarked for doubling the line from Abercynon and Aberdare and from Abercynon to Merthyr Tydfil. Extra platforms would also be built to handle the extra services.

== Facilities ==
There is a car park, two sets of bicycle stands, a ticket machine, waiting shelters and dot matrix departure screens. There is step-free access via a ramp from the subway.

== Passenger volume ==
Passenger Volume at Abercynon
	2008–09	2009–10	2010–11	2011–12	2012–13	2013–14	2014–15	2015–16	2016–17	2017–18	2018–19	2019–20	2020–21	2021–22	2022–23
Entries and exits	194,164	195,702	214,492	240,070	243,948	251,688	265,458	275,404	293,638	298,358	289,008	282,886	33,006	105,822	134,880
Interchanges	28,775	29,324	33,225	35,304	35,871	42,347	40,847	41,720	42,087	36,440	33,607	29,079	1,887	11,592	15,581

The statistics cover twelve month periods that start in April.

== Services ==
There are four trains per hour in each direction on Mondays to Saturdays: northbound to Aberdare and southbound to Merthyr Tydfil via Cardiff Central.

On Sundays, there are two trains per hour in each direction: northbound to Aberdare and to Merthyr Tydfil, with two southbound to Cardiff Central. The increase in the Sunday service frequency is due to a campaign by the local Assembly Member and a successful trial in December 2017; the extra services began in April 2018.

Preceding station	National Rail	Following station
Pontypridd	Transport for Wales; Merthyr Line	Quakers Yard
Pontypridd	Transport for Wales; Aberdare Branch	Penrhiwceiber

== Bibliography ==
- Quick, Michael (2023). Railway Passenger Stations in Great Britain: A Chronology (PDF) (5th ed.). London: Railway and Canal Historical Society.
