= Miguel Ferrer (disambiguation) =

Miguel Ferrer may refer to:

- Miguel Ferrer (1955–2017) Puerto Rican actor
- Miguel Ferrer (footballer) (born 1987) Cuban soccer player
- Miguel Ferrer (bishop) (1591–1659) Spaniard bishop of Tui

Patronomial surname

- Miguel A. Ferrer Deheza (1915–1989) Argentine politician
- Miguel Angel Ferrer Martínez (born 1978) Spaniard soccer player

Matronomial surname

- Miguel Cabanellas Ferrer (1872–1938) Spaniard Spanish army officer during the Spanish Civil War
- Miguel José Serra Ferrer (1713–1784) Spaniard priest, known as the Saint of California

== See also ==
- Ferrer (surname)
- Miguel (disambiguation)
- Ferrer (disambiguation)
