= Fernhill railway station =

Railway station in Rhondda Cynon Taf, Wales

Fernhill
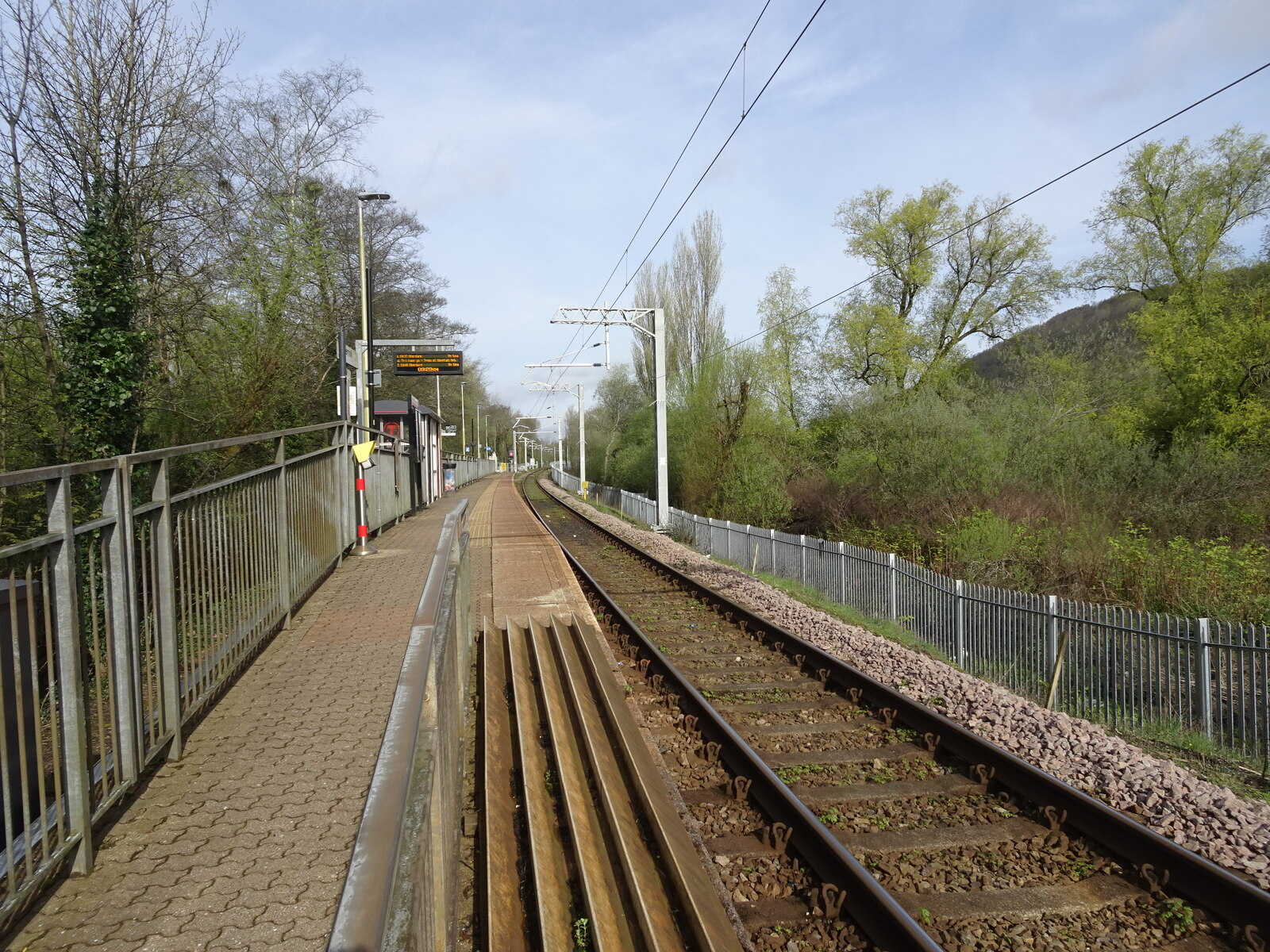
- Fernhill railway station in April 2024

General information
- Location: Fernhill, Rhondda Cynon Taf; Wales
- Coordinates: 51°41′12″N 3°23′45″W
- Grid reference: ST036995
- Manager: Transport for Wales
- Platforms: 1

Other information
- Station code: FER
- Classification: DfT category F2

Key dates
- 1988: Opened

Passengers
- 2021/22: ▲15,126
- 2022/23: ▲19,490
- 2023/24: ▼16,982
- 2024/25: ▲27,334
- 2025/26: ▲32,188
Location
Notes
- Passenger statistics from the Office of Rail and Road

Fernhill railway station serves the village of Fernhill in the Cynon Valley, Wales. It is located on the Aberdare branch of the Merthyr Line. Passenger services are provided by Transport for Wales.

== History ==
The station, along with the line to Aberdare, was opened by British Rail in 1988.

== Services ==
There is a half-hourly service in each direction on Mondays to Saturdays: northbound to Aberdare and southbound to Cardiff Central and Merthyr Tydfil. This drops to hourly in the evenings.

On Sundays, there is an hourly service between Aberdare and Cardiff Central. The increase in the Sunday service frequency is due to a campaign by the local Assembly Member and a successful trial in December 2017; the extra services began in April 2018.

Preceding station	National Rail	Following station
Mountain Ash	Transport for Wales; Aberdare Branch	Cwmbach
