= Merthyr (Plymouth Street) railway station =

Disused railway station in Merthyr Tydfil

Merthyr Plymouth Street

General information
- Location: Merthyr Tydfil, Merthyr Tydfil; Wales
- Coordinates: 51.7408°N 3.3747°W
- Platforms: 2

Other information
- Status: Disused

History
- Original company: Taff Vale Railway
- Pre-grouping: Great Western Railway
- Post-grouping: Great Western Railway

Key dates
- 1841: Opened
- 1877: Closed for passengers
- 1960s: closed for goods
Location

Merthyr Plymouth Street railway station was a station that served the town of Merthyr Tydfil, Wales on the Taff Vale Railway. The station opened in 1841 as the original station until the completion of the nearby Merthyr High Street station was opened on the Vale of Neath Railway. The station at Plymouth Street closed in 1877 to passengers which were diverted to the High Street station. Plymouth Street continued to be used for goods traffic until the 1960s. The viaduct was demolished and the site of Plymouth Street station is now occupied by Plymouth Court.

| Preceding station | Disused railways | Following station |
|---|---|---|
| Troed-y-rhiw; Line and station open | Taff Vale Railway | Terminus |
