= Lympstone Village railway station =

Railway station in Devon, England

Lympstone Village
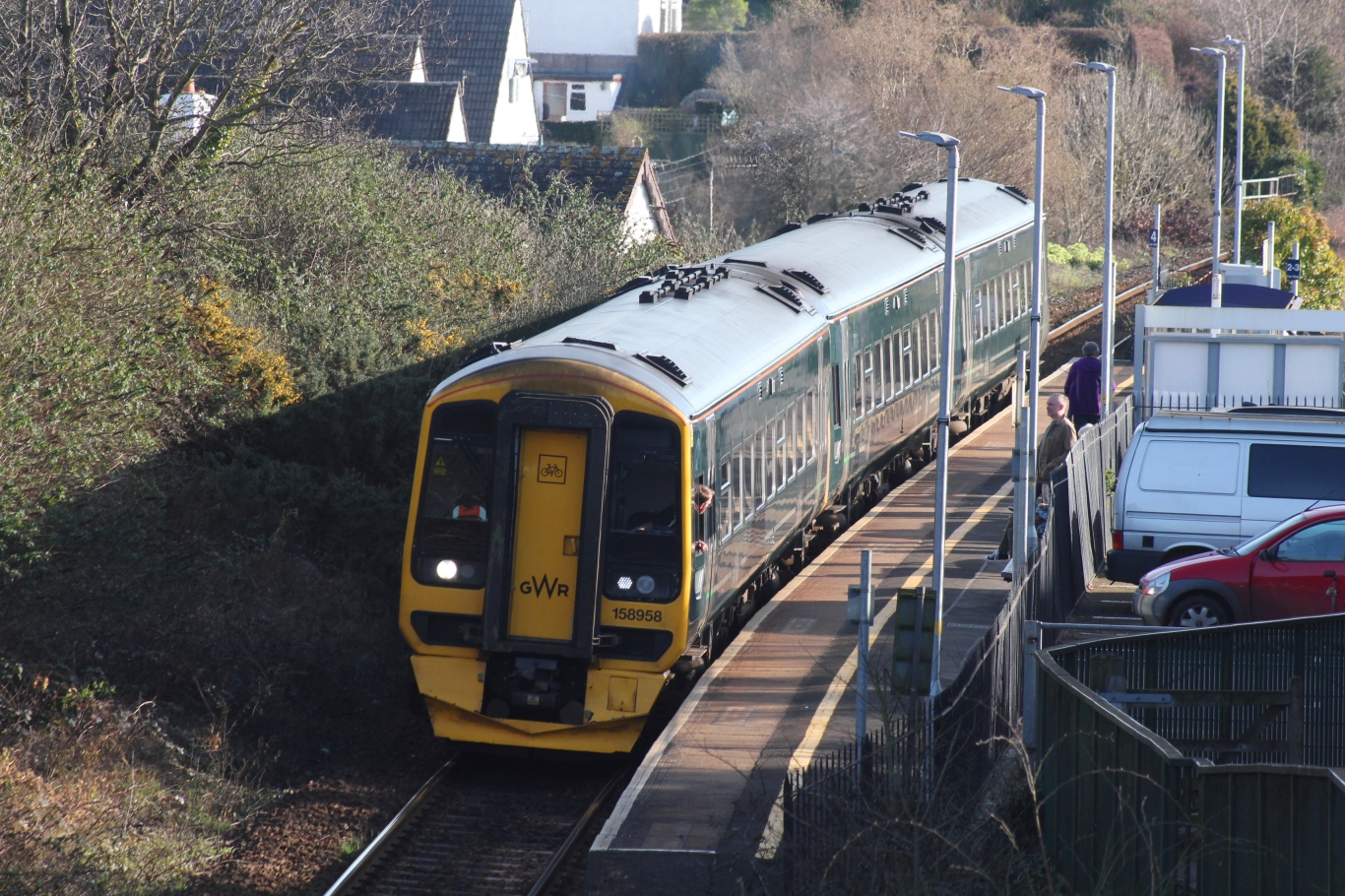

General information
- Location: Lympstone, East Devon; England
- Coordinates: 50.64884°N 3.43166°W
- Grid reference: SX989841
- Managed by: Great Western Railway
- Platforms: 1

Other information
- Station code: LYM
- Classification: DfT category F2

History
- Original company: London and South Western Railway
- Post-grouping: Southern Railway

Key dates
- 1861: Opened as Lympstone
- 3 May 1991: Renamed Lympstone Village

Passengers
- 2020/21: ▼27,330
- 2021/22: ▲71,054
- 2022/23: ▲83,042
- 2023/24: ▲91,520
- 2024/25: ▲92,994
Location
Notes
- Passenger statistics from the Office of Rail and Road

Lympstone Village railway station serves the village of Lympstone in Devon, England. It is on the Avocet Line which runs between Exeter St Davids and Exmouth.

== History ==
Lympstone station was opened along with the railway on 1 May 1861. It was renamed 'Lympstone Village' in 1991 to avoid confusion with the new Lympstone Commando railway station that had opened on 3 May 1976.

Following the privatisation of British Rail, the service was operated by Wales & West, latterly Wessex Trains; on 31 March 2006, the franchise was taken over by First Great Western.

== Description and facilities ==
The station is situated on an embankment, with a single platform; a disused second platform is now heavily overgrown. To the south, the line crosses the village on a low viaduct.

It is unstaffed and tickets cannot be purchased at the station. There are stands for bicycle parking and a 20-space car park.

== Services ==
Great Western Railway operate all trains serving the station. There are generally half-hourly stopping trains between Exmouth and Paignton, via Exeter St Davids.

Preceding station	National Rail	Following station
Lympstone Commando towards Exeter St Davids	Great Western Railway Avocet Line	Exmouth Terminus
