= Cwmbach railway station =

Railway station in Rhondda Cynon Taf, Wales

Cwmbach Welsh: Cwm-bach
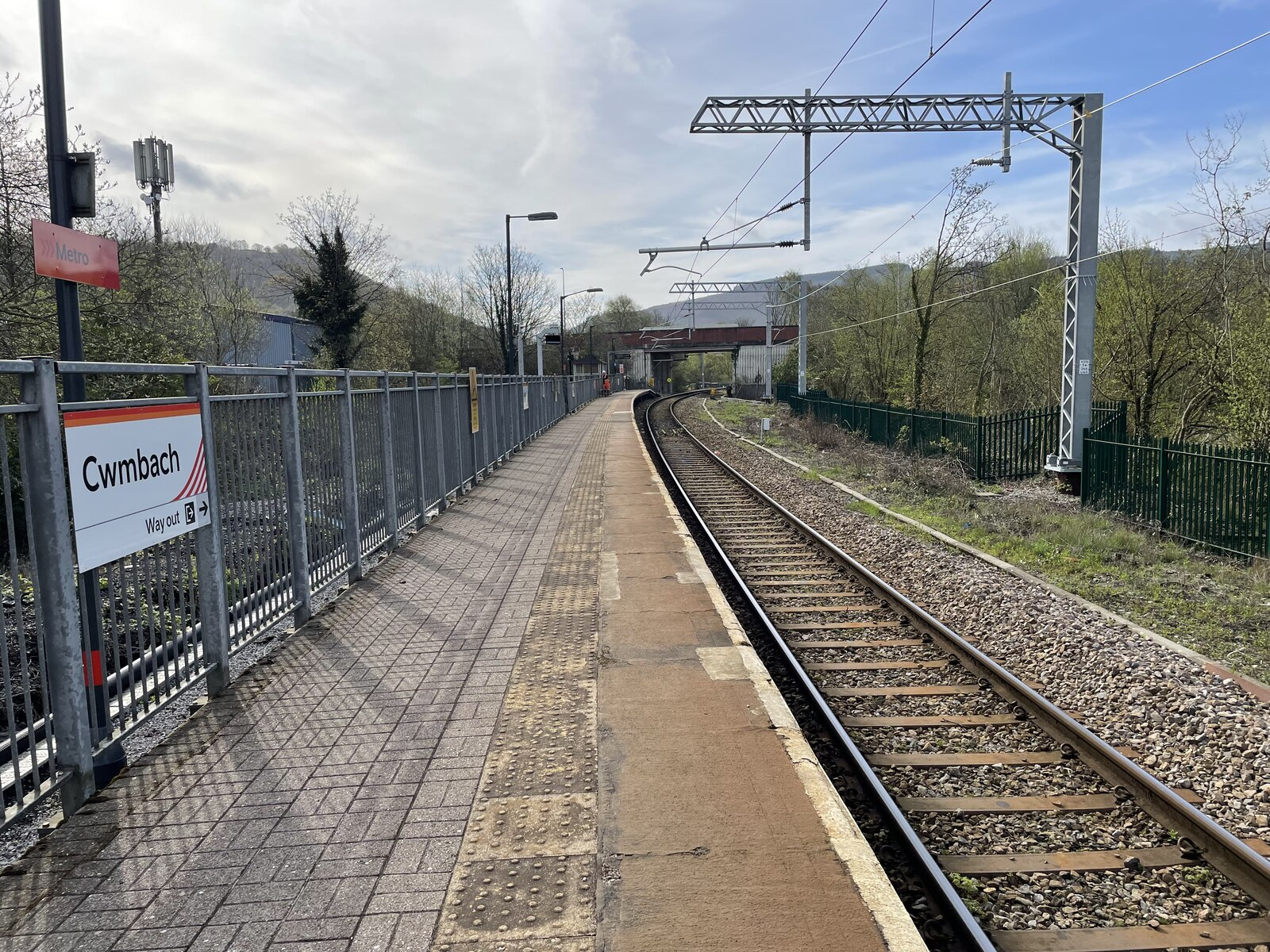

General information
- Location: Cwmbach, Rhondda Cynon Taf; Wales
- Coordinates: 51°42′04″N 3°24′52″W
- Grid reference: SO023012
- Manager: Transport for Wales
- Platforms: 1

Other information
- Station code: CMH
- Classification: DfT category F2

Key dates
- 1914: Opened
- 13 June 1964: Closed
- 3 October 1988: Reopened

Passengers
- 2021/22: ▲24,532
- 2022/23: ▲32,994
- 2023/24: ▲34,096
- 2024/25: ▲49,736
- 2025/26: ▲52,656
Location
Notes
- Passenger statistics from the Office of Rail and Road

Cwmbach railway station serves the village of Cwmbach in Rhondda Cynon Taf, Wales. It is located on the Aberdare branch of the Merthyr Line. Passenger services are provided by Transport for Wales.

== History ==
The first station on this site was a halt opened by the Great Western Railway in 1914. It closed with the line in 1964.

The present station, along with the line to Aberdare, was reopened by British Rail in 1988.

During 2005, construction work was carried out to double the platform length. This now allows four-carriage trains to stop at the station.

== Services ==
There is a half-hourly service in each direction on Mondays to Saturdays: northbound to Aberdare and southbound to Cardiff Central and Merthyr Tydfil. This drops to hourly in the evenings.

On Sundays, there is an hourly service between Aberdare and Cardiff Central. The increase in the Sunday service frequency is due to a campaign by the local Assembly Member and a successful trial in December 2017; the extra services began in April 2018.

DB Cargo UK operated coal trains to Tower Colliery until its closure in 2008, passing through the station on weekdays and some Saturdays. Freightliner also operated an irregular stone service to Tower. The line beyond the terminus at Aberdare remains in place, but is currently out of use.

Preceding station	National Rail	Following station
Fernhill	Transport for Wales; Merthyr Line	Aberdare
