= Héctor Altuve Ferrer =

Héctor J. Altuve Ferrer (born October 5, 1947) is a Dean at the Schweitzer Engineering Laboratories, Monterrey, Mexico. He was named Fellow of the Institute of Electrical and Electronics Engineers (IEEE) in 2015 for contributions to power line and transformer protection.

Altuve Ferrer attended Central University of Las Villas in Santa Clara from which he got his BSEE. After obtaining Ph.D. from the Igor Sikorsky Kyiv Polytechnic Institute, he served on the faculty of the School of Electrical Engineering at Central University from 1969 to 1993. Between 1993 and 2000, Altuve served as professor of the Graduate Doctoral Program in the Mechanical and Electrical Engineering School at the Universidad Autónoma de Nuevo León in Monterrey, Mexico and from 1999 to 2000 was the Schweitzer Visiting Professor in the Department of Electrical Engineering at Washington State University.
