= Merthyr line =

Commuter railway line in South Wales

Coordinates: 51.6140°N 3.3306°W

Merthyr Line
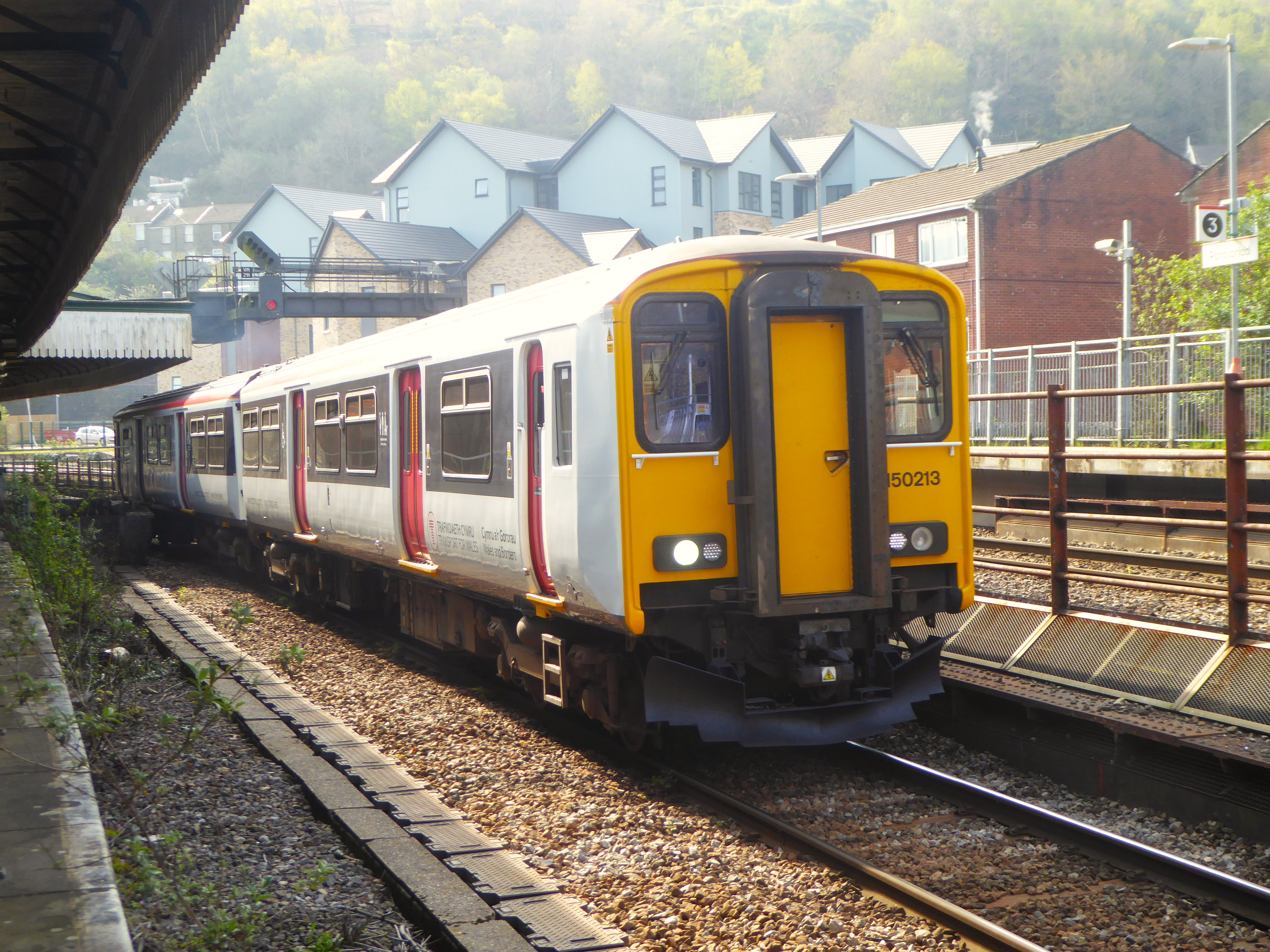
- A Transport for Wales diesel multiple unit at Pontypridd

Overview
- Owner: Transport for Wales
- Locale: Cardiff; Rhondda Cynon Taff
- Termini: Cardiff Central; Merthyr Tydfil; Aberdare

Service
- Type: Suburban rail
- System: National Rail
- Operator: Transport for Wales Rail
- Rolling stock: Class 150 DMUs; Class 231; Class 756

Technical
- Line length: Merthyr–Abercynon: 8 miles 18 chains (13.2 km); Aberdare–Abercynon: 6 miles 8 chains (9.8 km); Abercynon–Cardiff: 15 miles 74 chains (25.6 km); Total: 30 miles 20 chains (48.7 km)
- Number of tracks: Double track Cardiff to Abercynon, single track with passing loops on the Aberdare and Merthyr Tydfil branches
- Track gauge: 4 ft 8 1/2 in (1,435 mm) standard gauge
- Electrification: 25 kV 50 hz AC OLE (Discontinuous)
Route map
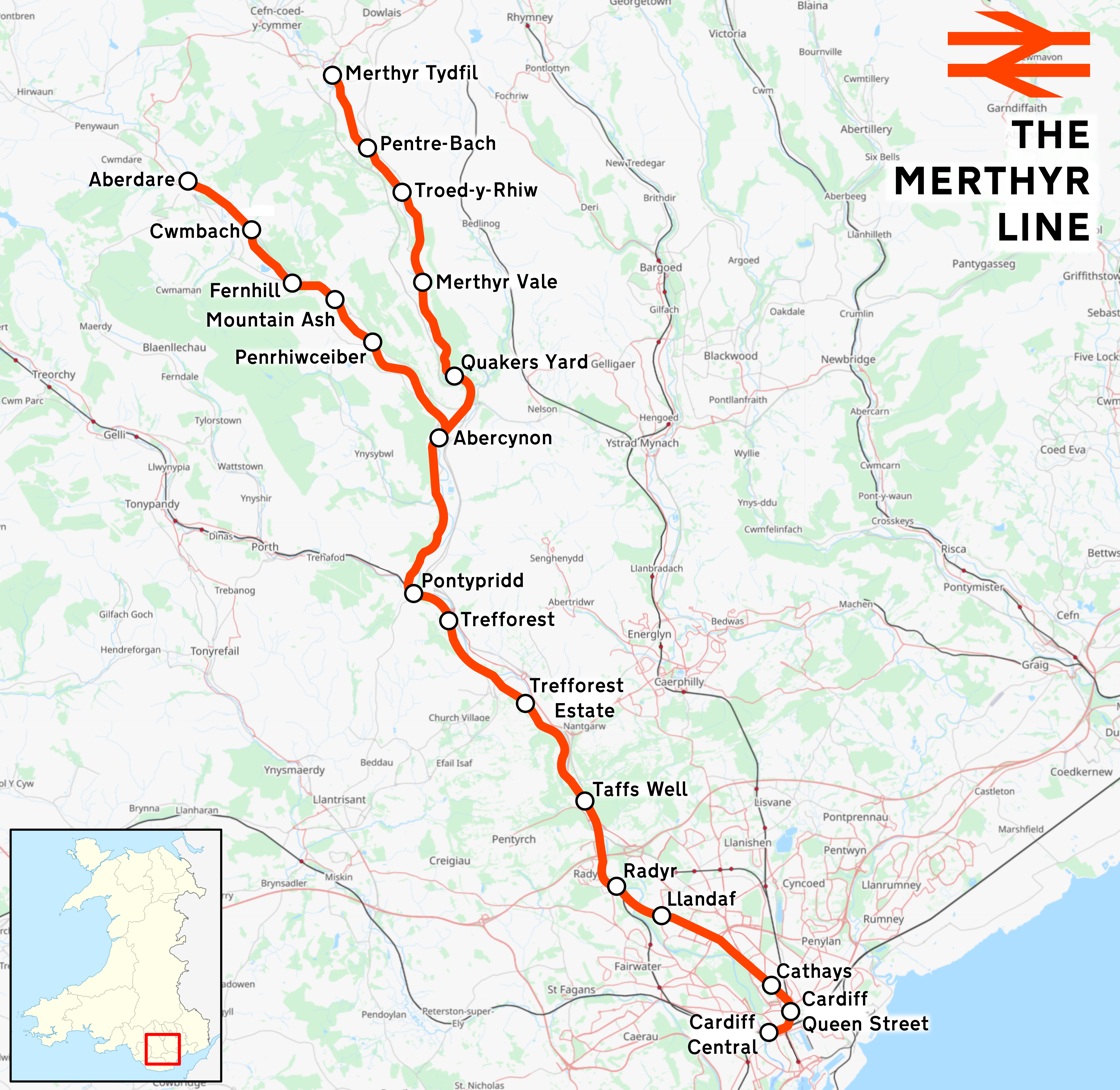
(Click to expand)

The Merthyr line is a suburban rail line in South Wales; it connects Cardiff Central with Merthyr Tydfil and Aberdare. The line is part of the Cardiff suburban rail network, known as the Valley Lines.

== History ==
Historically, the line was the Taff Vale Railway (TVR), the first rail development in the Valleys in the 1840s. It was associated with the notorious Taff Vale Judgment in 1901, when the courts penalised trade unions for losses caused by strikes.

The Aberdare line was closed in 1964 under the Beeching Axe. The line was reopened in 1988, in an attempt to stimulate jobs and employment in the valley in response to the closure of the last few coal mines.

In 2005, following further grant from the Welsh Assembly, the stations at Abercynon, Penrhiwceiber, Fernhill, Cwmbach and Aberdare were extended to four-car length to accommodate longer peak trains in an initiative to relieve overcrowding; train leasing/running costs were funded by the Welsh Assembly Government.

== Route ==
The line follows the Rhondda line as far as Pontypridd, serving Cathays, Llandaf, Radyr, Taffs Well and Treforest. It then divides at Abercynon, with separate branches to Merthyr and Aberdare up diverging valleys.

The Merthyr branch serves Quakers Yard, Merthyr Vale, Troed-y-rhiw, Pentre-bach and Merthyr Tydfil. The Welsh Assembly confirmed in February 2007 that it was grant funding a scheme to upgrade the line north of Abercynon, in conjunction with European Union Objective 1 assistance. This included reinstatement of two miles of double track, to enable the introduction of a half-hourly train service; the revenue costs of which the Welsh Assembly also met. The enhanced service was said to commence in 2008 but was postponed to May 2009.

The Aberdare branch serves Penrhiwceiber, Mountain Ash, Fernhill, Cwmbach and Aberdare. Although following the original TVR route, beyond the former Abercwmboi Halt to access Tower Colliery, the line diverts onto the route of the former Vale of Neath Railway. The line continues beyond Aberdare, for goods purposes only, to serve Tower Colliery, which was the last deep coal mine to remain open in South Wales. Mountain Ash station was redeveloped with a grant from the Welsh Assembly Government in the early part of the decade, the scheme including the provision of a new station and a passing loop to permit an upgrade of the passenger service to two trains per hour from late 2003. There are a few gaps in the half-hourly service to enable coal/stone trains to run to/from Tower Colliery/Hirwaun.

== Services ==
The line is currently operated by Transport for Wales (TfW), as part of the Valley Lines network.

Both the Merthyr and Aberdare branch lines have a half-hourly service during the day, which decreases to hourly in the evening. The Sunday service frequency decreases to hourly.

In December 2017, the-then operator Arriva Trains Wales introduced extra Sunday morning services on the Aberdare line on a trial basis. This was in response to demand from the local Assembly Member. The trial was deemed a success and the extra Sunday services were made permanent from April 2018.

== Extension to Hirwaun ==
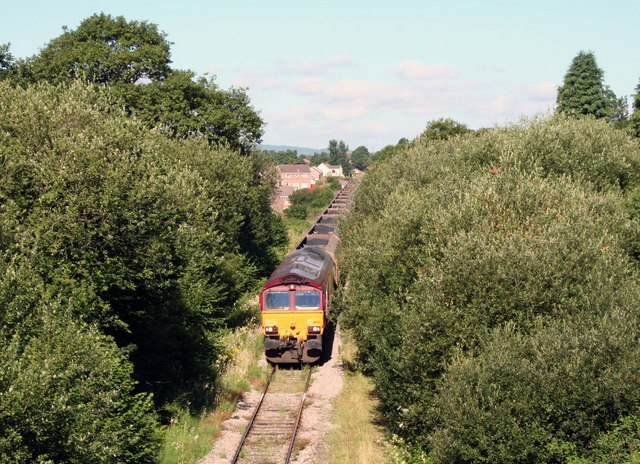
EWS Class 66 moves coal from Tower Colliery towards Aberdare, 2006

Since its termination at Aberdare, following the Beeching Axe, there have been various proposals to extend the line northwards towards Hirwaun again. In recent years, these have been driven by the Welsh Assembly Government.

In 2006, a study by local transport alliance Sewta appeared to rule out any such extension for the foreseeable future.

In November 2009, the Welsh Assembly sponsored Network Rail in a feasibility study to reopening both the section to Hirwaun, and parts of the former Anglesey Central Railway between Llangefni on Anglesey, and Bangor. Network Rail began work on gathering evidence for its study, beginning with cutting away vegetation on track sections to examine the condition of rails and track bedding. Its report was expected to be published in early 2010, before any business case to reopen the lines can be developed.

It was announced in March 2011 that the Welsh Assembly Government's 2011–12 capital programme would include the reopening of the line to Hirwaun as part of the Cynon Valley Scheme although the project appears to have advanced little at that time. In 2019-2020, the Cardiff Capital Region's transport authority secured £100,000 of funding from the Welsh Government's Local Transport Fund to undertake a Welsh Transport Appraisal Guidance (WelTAG) 1 study into the feasibility of extending Aberdare Line passenger services through reopened Trecynon Halt and Hirwaun stations to a new terminus serving the Tower strategic development site.

As already noted, the line is now closed above Aberdare, but the aspiration to reopen with a passenger service remains and so the track is being retained in situ.

== Electrification ==
On 16 July 2012, plans to electrify the line were announced by the Government as part of a £9.4bn package of investment of the railways in England and Wales.

The announcement was made as an extension of the electrification of the South Wales Main Line from Cardiff to Swansea; the electrification of the south Wales Valley Lines at a total cost of £350 million. The investment requires new trains and should result in reduced journeys times and cheaper maintenance. Work was expected to start between 2014 and 2019.

However, this line has since been included in Welsh Government's South Wales Metro scheme of transportation upgrades, and electrification of the line was completed in 2023 with new Class 756 electric trains running on the line by November 2024.

== See also ==
- List of railway stations in Cardiff
