= Suzi Ferrer =

American contemporary feminist visual artist

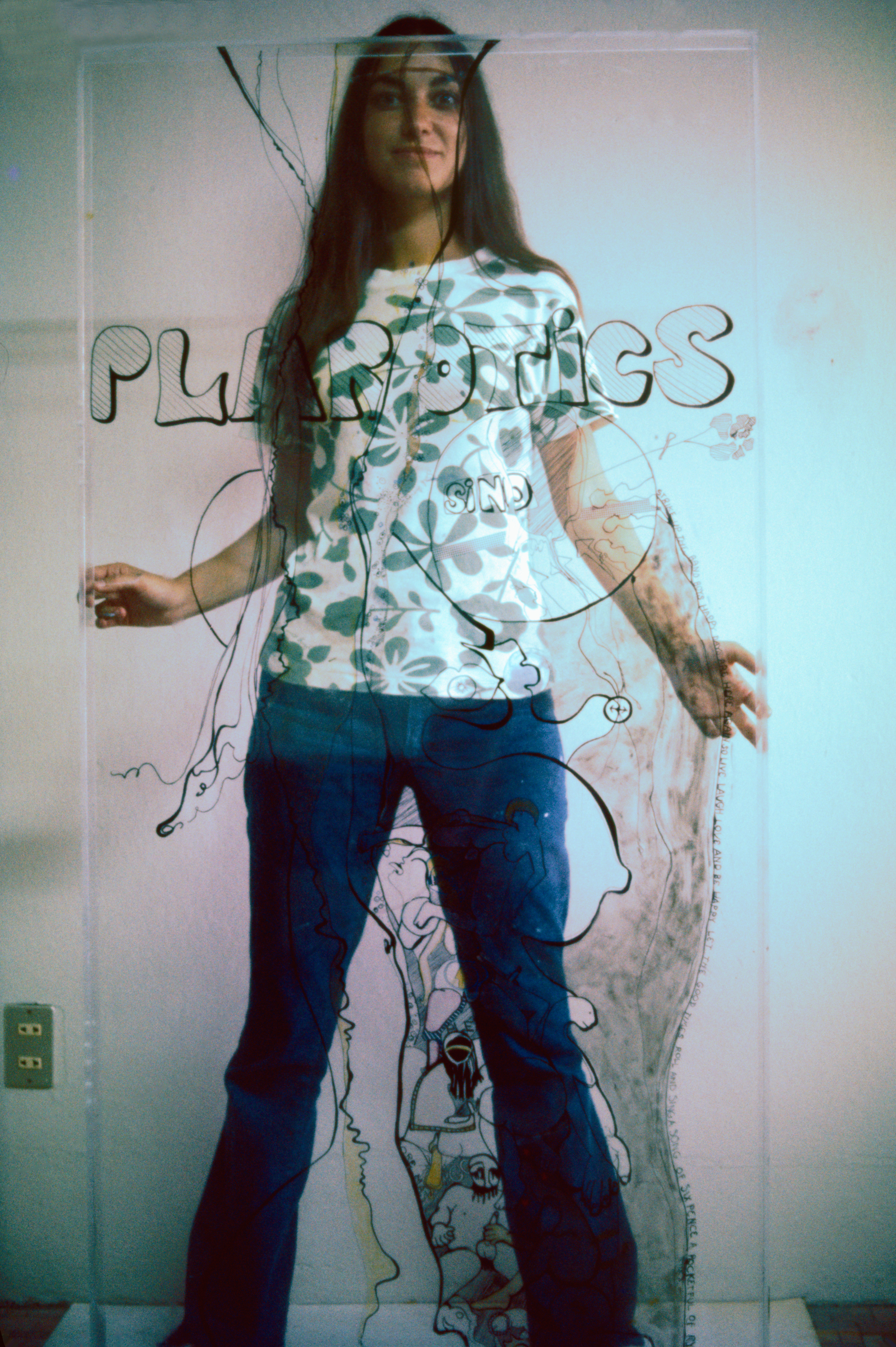
- Portrait of Suzi Ferrer behind "Plarotics" panel.
- Born: Susan Nudelman; May 24, 1940; Brooklyn, New York, US
- Died: April 6, 2006 (aged 65); Los Angeles, California
- Spouses: Miguel A. Ferrer (1962-1975); Stephen Goldsmith (1984-2006)
- Website: www.suziferrer.info

Suzi Ferrer (May 24, 1940 – April 6, 2006) (born Susan Nudelman, also known as Sasha Ferrer, was a visual artist based in San Juan, Puerto Rico from the mid-1960s to 1975. She is known for her transgressive, irreverent, avant-garde, art brut and feminist work.

== Biography ==
Suzi was the eldest child of Ruth Epstein Susser and Samuel Nudelman, both second generation Austrian, Polish and Belarusian Jewish immigrants. Sasha, as her parents referred to her, graduated from Jamaica High School, New York, in 1958, where she excelled and was active in the drama department. Her main interest was acting and she hoped to make a career in television.

In the summer of 1958, Nudelman enrolled in the Fine Arts program at Cornell University, graduating in 1962. She exhibited her work at the Andrew Dickson White Museum of Art (now the Herbert F. Johnson Museum) and the Franklin Gallery, both on the university campus. While at Cornell, she also continued acting, appearing in several campus plays as well as a brief stint on Broadway in The Pajama Game in 1959.

After graduating, Sasha married Puerto Rican Miguel A. Ferrer, whom she met while he was studying for his MBA at Cornell University. They moved to New York City, visiting galleries and buying contemporary art. They lived a nomadic life, traveling between New York and San Juan during the first years of their marriage. With their daughter, Ilena (b. 1964), the Ferrers settled permanently in Puerto Rico in the mid-1960s. Their son, Miguel, was born in Puerto Rico in 1969.

By the mid-1970s, Ferrer stopped producing art and delved into other creative pursuits. She relocated to San Francisco, and as "Sasha Ferrer", she worked as a cultural manager, graphic designer, publicist, and community liaison for the San Francisco Arts Commission Neighborhood Arts Program. She offered workshops on television camera techniques and worked as a consultant for the marketing firm Beyl & Boyd. In the late 1970s, she was hired to do a study of the physics and psychology of color to design the corporate image for the Vancouver Canucks hockey team.

In late 1979, she began her work in television at Videowest, a San Francisco based alternative theme show where she worked as a producer, writer, actress, and director, meeting her future husband, Stephen Goldsmith, in the process. In 1982, she created and directed the television pilot for young people, Smarkus and Company, leading to her move to Los Angeles in 1983. Once in LA, Ferrer initially worked as an executive at the Disney Channel and in subsequent years worked at Endemol, Triage Productions, Warner Bros. and The Landsburg Company, the latter producing her TV movie In Defense of a Married Man. In 1987 she was stricken with breast cancer, a disease that came and went over the remainder of her life. Drawing on her own experience, Ferrer wrote and produced the NBC documentary Destined to Live, that chronicled the recovery journey of a hundred breast cancer patients, for which she received a 1990 Humanitas Prize. However, 19 years after her initial cancer diagnosis, and after many periods of remission, she relapsed, dying in Los Angeles in April 2006, just short of her 66th birthday.

== Art ==
Ferrer's artistic career lasted only ten years, but they were very productive. She participated in five individual exhibitions, more than fifteen collective exhibitions in galleries in New York and San Juan, and three international biennials. Parallel to her artistic career, in the early seventies she began graduate studies in psychology at the University of Puerto Rico, Río Piedras Campus. In 1976 she presented her thesis "A Theoretical Discussion of Creative Process and Exploratory Study of the Creative Puerto Rican", in which she interviewed 12 creatives who worked in Puerto Rico to listen to their creative process. That same year, Antonio Molina, art critic for the newspaper El Mundo, included Ferrer in the artist biographies section in volume VIII of the Gran Enciclopedia de Puerto Rico.

In the 1970s, Ferrer produced drawings, prints and complex, immersive art installations which used acrylic or Plexiglas, as support for her works. Introduced in the 1930s, by the 1960s Plexiglas was being employed by contemporary artists internationally as a material that inherently referenced that moment in time. Furthermore, Plexiglas’ transparency provided an eloquent visual for Ferrer’s images, whose composition was designed to be overlaid with other drawings or illustrated panels, so they can be jostled together and seen simultaneously through transparent layers. This illusion creates an interesting play between the apparent depth in the composition versus the flatness of the drawing. In addition, because Plexiglas is slightly reflective, viewers perceive their own reflection, implicating their bodies as part of the work and adding another layer of an imaged human body. Viewers can also see through Plexiglas layers, potentially perceiving other bodies behind the images.

Ferrer used drawing as an act of defiance against conventional imagery of the body, sexuality, and desire. Like other female artists of the time, Ferrer's work became figurative, with deliberate breast, vaginal, and penile imagery, exploring female empowerment, gender roles, female desire, and pleasure. Pop art became the ideal platform for navigating these issues: Ferrer juxtaposed comic book superhero images, catechism textbook illustrations, Chris Foss' drawings published in The Joy of Sex, illustrations by children’s author Richard Scarry, and art-historical references to create images critical of patriarchal society. Her complex and critical images flipped the canon and focused on the female gaze — a women’s desiring gaze on a male object of sexual desire — thereby celebrating self-assured femininity.

Almost fifty years after her pieces were first exhibited in galleries in Puerto Rico, art historian Melissa M. Ramos Borges organized and curated the first retrospective of the artist. With the title Suzi Ferrer, the exhibition opened in September 2021 at the Miramar Museum of Art and Design (MADMi).

=== Exhibitions ===
| Year | Location | Type |
|---|---|---|
| 1965 | Galería Campeche, Ateneo Puertorriqueño | Collective |
| 1966 | La Casa del Arte, Old San Juan, Puerto Rico | Individual |
| 1966 | Experimentos serigráficos del taller ICP, Galería Colibrí, Viejo San Juan | Collective |
| 1968 | Museo de Historia, Antropología y Arte (MHAA), Universidad de Puerto Rico | Collective |
| 1969 | La Casa del Arte, Old San Juan, Puerto Rico | Individual |
| 1969 | Puerto Rican Art, New York | Collective |
| 1971 | Plarotics, La Casa del Arte, Viejo San Juan, Puerto Rico | Individual |
| 1972 | 2nd Bienal del Grabado Latinoamericano de San Juan, Convento de los Dominicos | |
| 1972 | IX Biennale Internationale d'Art de Menton, France | |
| 1973 | WestBroadway Gallery, New York | Individual |
| 1973 | Primavera, Galería Colibrí, Viejo San Juan, Puerto Rico | Collective |
| 1973 | New York Artists WestBroadway, Rundetårn, Copenhagen, Denmark | Collective |
| 1973 | Puerto Rican Prints: An Exxon Collection, traveling show | Collective |
| 1973 | Puerto Rican Prints, Galería Colibrí, Viejo San Juan, Puerto Rico Housatonic Museum of Art, Housatonic Community College, Bridgeport, Connecticut | Collective |
| 1973 | XII Bienal de São Paulo, Puerto Rican delegation, Brasil | |
| 1974 | Inaugural exhibition, Centro Nacional de las Artes, Viejo San Juan, Puerto | Collective |
| 1974 | Mujeres Puertorriqueñas, La Galería, Viejo San Juan | Collective |
| 1974 | Puerto Rican Prints, organized by the Pratt Graphic Center, New York | Collective |
| 1974 | 3ra Bienal del Grabado Latinoamericano de San Juan, Convento de los Dominicos, Viejo San Juan, Puerto Rico | |
| 1975 | WestBroadway Gallery, New York | Individual |
| 1975 | Dibujo y collage, Centro Nacional de las Artes, Viejo San Juan, Puerto Rico | Collective |
| 1976 | Colectiva Gráfica Latinoamericana, Museo de Historia, Antropología y Arte (MHAA), Universidad de Puerto Rico, Recinto de Río Piedras | Collective |
| 1980 | Grabados Puertorriqueños de la ESSO Standard Oil Company, Biblioteca del Colegio Regional de Arecibo | Collective |
| 2019 | Anarquía y dialéctica en el deseo: géneros y marginalidad en Puerto Rico/Anarchy, dialectics and genres in the MAC Parte I, Museo de Arte Contemporáneo de Puerto Rico, Santurce | Collective |
| 2021 | Suzi Ferrer Retrospective, Museo de Arte y Diseño de Miramar (MADMi), San Juan, Puerto Rico | Individual |

=== Collections ===
- Instituto de Cultura Puertorriqueña
- ESSO Standard Oil Collection
- EXXON
- MHAA
- MADMi

=== Distinctions ===
Ganadora - medio gráfico, IBEC, 1967.

10 Best Dressed Women in Puerto Rico, The San Juan Star, 1968.

10 Best Dressed Women in Puerto Rico, The San Juan Star, 1969

Special Award Winner, 15th Annual Humanitas Prize, 1990

== Selected publications ==
Bloch, Peter. Painting and Sculpture of Puerto Ricans. New York: Plus Ultra Educational Publishers, 1978. (includes several black and white plates of Suzi Ferrer's work)

Fernández, Jesse. "Installations at the Colibrí." The San Juan Star, May 27, 1973, 14-15. (includes plates and description of her 1973 installation Portrait in Six Dimensions)

Fernández Méndez, Eugenio y Manuel Cárdenas Ruiz. "‘Instalaciones’ Del Mundo Absurdo En La Colibrí." Avance, June 18, 1973, 44-44. (includes plates and description of her 1973 installation Portrait in Six Dimensions)

Fullana Acosta, Mariela. "Redescubriendo el arte y la vida de Suzi Ferrer." El Nuevo Día, October 12, 2021. (Review published in Puerto Rican newspaper of 2021 retrospective exhibition at Museo de Arte y Diseño de Miramar)

López Pérez, Stephanie. "Suzi Ferrer: Deconstruye estereotipos a través del arte feminista." 90 Grados, 18 September 2021. (Review in digital Puerto Rican publication of 2021 retrospective exhibition at Museo de Arte y Diseño de Miramar)

Molina, Antonio. "Fichero Biográfico." In Gran Enciclopedia de Puerto Rico, edited by Vicente Báez. Madrid: Ediciones R, September 1976. (includes several black and white and color plates of Ferrer's work)

"¿Manifesto De Arte U Obra Feminista?" El Mundo, June 19, 1973, 11A. (Review of installation 'Portrait in Six Dimensions' when first exhibited in the Galería Colibrí in 1973)

Pérez González, Aisha. "Arte, Vanguardia y Feminismo: Vida y Obra de Suzi Ferrer." B.A., Universidad de Puerto Rico, Recinto de Río Piedras, 2018.

Ramos Borges, Melissa M. "Omisión O Censura: Una Revisión De La Vanguardia Artística En Puerto Rico, 1960-1970." Ph. D., Universidad Autónoma de Madrid, 2019. (First comprehensive study of avant garde art in Puerto Rico, contextualizes Ferrer's work with her contemporaries working on the island)

"Unos Comentarios En Torno a La Obra Experimental De Suzi Ferrer." Paper presented at the VIII Coloquio de investigación de historia de las mujeres: Mujer en las artes, Universidad de Puerto Rico, Utuado Campus, March 20, 2019. (Author analyses installation 'Portrait in Six Dimmensions' using Simone de Beauvoir's The Second Sex as theoretical framework)

Rodríguez, Jorge. "Suzi Ferrer y el desafío al convencionalismo fememino." El Vocero, September 21, 2021. (Review published in Puerto Rican newspaper of 2021 retrospective exhibition at Museo de Arte y Diseño de Miramar)

Ruiz de la Mata, Ernesto Jaime. "Suzi Ferrer." The San Juan Star, September 19, 1971, 10-11. (published text is an interview with Ferrer, with several black and white plates of her work)
