= Fer (name) =

Fer is a name. Notable people with the name include:

- Cairbre Nia Fer, legendary Irish king
- Fer (comics): Spanish comic writer (1949-2020)
- Fer Corb, legendary High King of Ireland
- Ferdiad, also Fer Diad, a legendary Irish warrior
- Fer dá Chrích mac Suibni (c. 710-768), Roman Catholic Archbishop of Armagh, Ireland
- Claudio Rodriguez Fer (born 1956), Galician writer
- Émilie Fer (born 1983), French slalom canoer and 2012 Olympic gold medalist
- Leroy Fer (born 1990), Dutch footballer
- Nicolas de Fer (1646–1720), French cartographer and geographer, engraver and publisher
