= FERONIA =

Feronia, also known as FER or protein Sirene, is a recognition receptor kinase found in plants. FER plays a significant part in the plant immune system as a receptor kinase which assists in immune signaling within plants, plant growth, and plant reproduction. FER is regulated by the Rapid Alkalinization Factor (RALF). FER regulates growth in normal environments but it is most beneficial in stressful environments as it helps to initiate immune signaling. FER can also play a role in reproduction in plants by participating in the communication between the female and male cells. FER is found in and can be studied in the organism Arabidopsis thaliana.

== Taxonomic lineage ==
Feronia (FER) has a taxonomic lineage as follows: Eukaryota > Viridiplantae > Streptophyta > Embryophyta > Tracheophyta > Spermatophyta > Magnoliophyta > Eudicotyledons > Gunneridae > Pentapetalae > Rosids > Malvids > Brassicales > Brassicaceae > Camelineae > Arabidopsis.

== Background ==
Arabidopsis thaliana is a weed commonly found alongside roads and is frequently used in experiments which examine plant genetics or biology. It can be studied due to its small number of megabase pairs (Mbp) which makes it easily synthesized. It is used often to observe and understand plant immunity and it can be used to observe the functions of pattern recognition receptors (PRR). The Site-1 Protease (S1P) found in Arabidopsis plays a role in inhibiting plant immunity when it cleaves the Rapid alkalization factor (RALF). RALF can be subject to malfunction or failure due to S1P which then causes a decrease in root growth for the plant. RALF proteins are found in plants and could be the proteins which make up the signaling portions found within the immune system of plants. Feronia (FER)' mediates the inhibition caused by the S1P in Arabidopsis. FER is one of the known 17 proteins which play a part in Arabidopsis Catharanthus roseus RLK1-like kinases (CrRLK1Ls).

== Discovery ==
Initially being discovered from a pollen tube reception mutant, feronia (FER) was found to be necessary in cell growth and hormone response. During a study of the reproduction of angiosperms, there were continued failures in the interaction of the synergid and the pollen tubes that caused infertility. The feronia (FER) mutant female gametophyte was tested in this process and found that it inhibited the rupture of the sperm cells and invaded the embryo sac. This furthered expression of synergid- specific genes and helped with extension of the pollen tubes. Feronia(FER) was named after the Etruscan fertility goddess as it increases growth.

RALF was isolated as a small peptide when it alkalized cell wall growth rapidly and inhibited cell growth in tobacco leaves. In Arabidopsis roots, the RALF- FER signal transduction pathways continues to control and moderate cell growth and hormone responses in the plasma membrane and root cell growth. Feronia is the receptor to RALF and was found to regulate the effect of RALF in the cell elongation in the Arabidopsis roots.

== Biological function ==
Often, pattern recognition receptors (PRRs) found in the plant immune system are receptor kinases, i.e. Arabidopsis thaliana. Feronia (FER) is a Arabidopsis malectin-like receptor kinase for binding to the Rapid Alkalinization Factor (RALF) which has been discovered to be linked to the plasma membrane H+-ATPase. FER contributes to the positive regulation of immunity by acting as a scaffold. FER could occupy parts of the microdomains found in the plasma membrane and perform with both the receptors and coreceptors to create signaling platforms. In this way, FER can inhibit cell elongation and growth as well as regulate fertilization. FER also plays a role in regulating the elongation length of plant roots in Arabidopsis as well as regulating pathways involved with hormone responses such as auxin-promoted root hair growth. FER could also be connected to the regulatory pathway associated with ABA-mediated abiotic stress responses because it can activate a negative regulator of ABA signaling known as the ABI2. The FER kinase can activate the GTPase ROP11/ARAC10 in plants through communication and interaction with the guanine exchange factors GEF1, GEF4, and GEF10.

== See also ==
Pattern recognition receptors (PRRs)

Arabidopsis thaliana

Site-1 Protease (S1P)
