= Aberdare railway station =

Railway station in Aberdare, Wales

Aberdare Welsh: Aberdâr
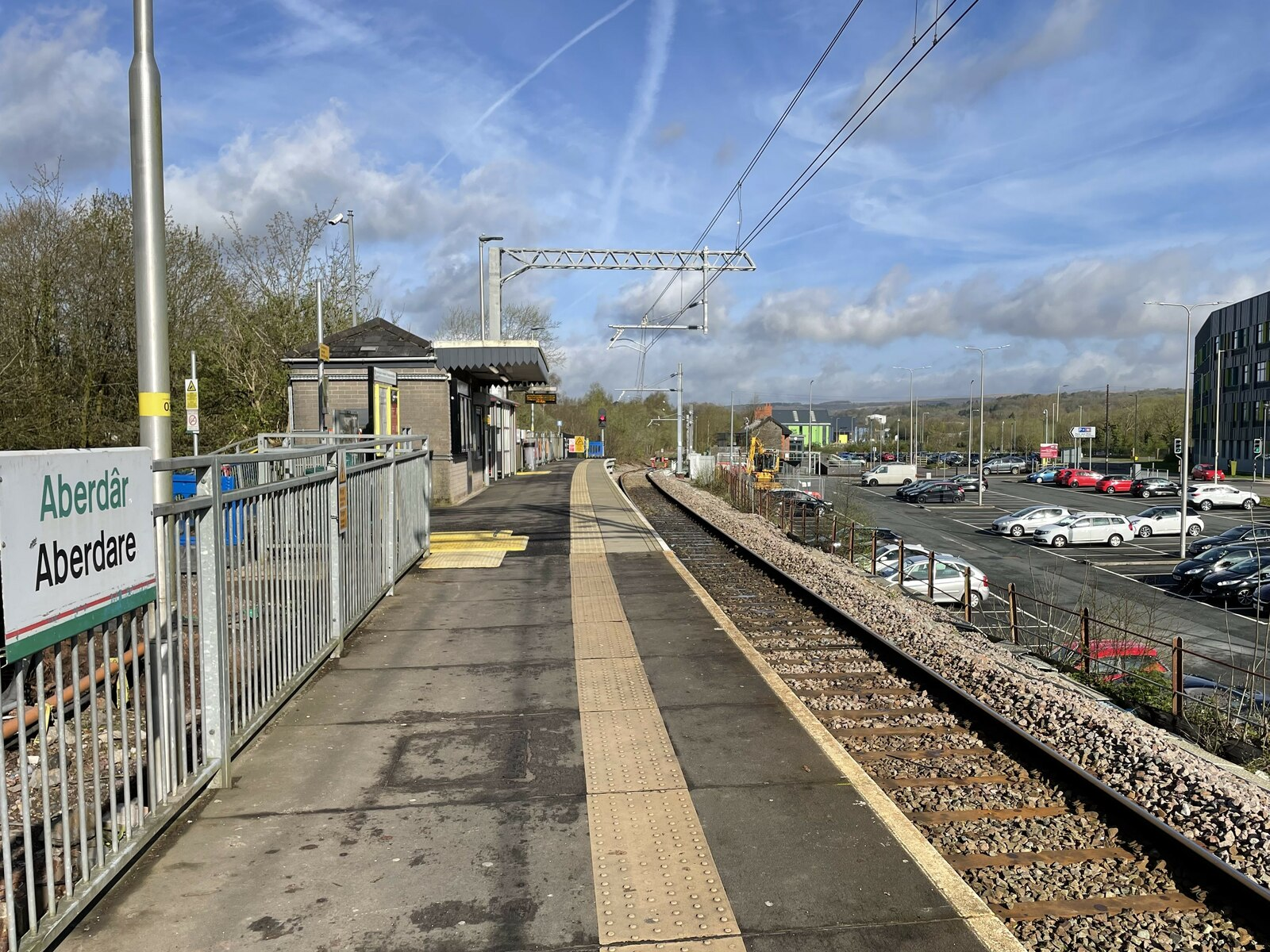

General information
- Location: Aberdare, Rhondda Cynon Taf; Wales
- Coordinates: 51°42′52″N 3°26′31″W
- Grid reference: SO004027
- Manager: Transport for Wales
- Platforms: 2

Other information
- Station code: ABA
- Classification: DfT category E

Key dates
- 3 October 1988: Station opens

Passengers
- 2020/21: ▼53,668
- 2021/22: ▲0.177 million
- 2022/23: ▲0.227 million
- 2023/24: ▲0.239 million
- 2024/25: ▲0.341 million
Location
Notes
- Passenger statistics from the Office of Rail and Road

Aberdare railway station (Welsh: Aberdâr) serves the town of Aberdare in Rhondda Cynon Taf, Wales. It is the terminus of the Aberdare branch of the Merthyr Line, 22½ miles (36 km) north-north-west of Cardiff Central. Passenger services are provided by Transport for Wales.

== History ==
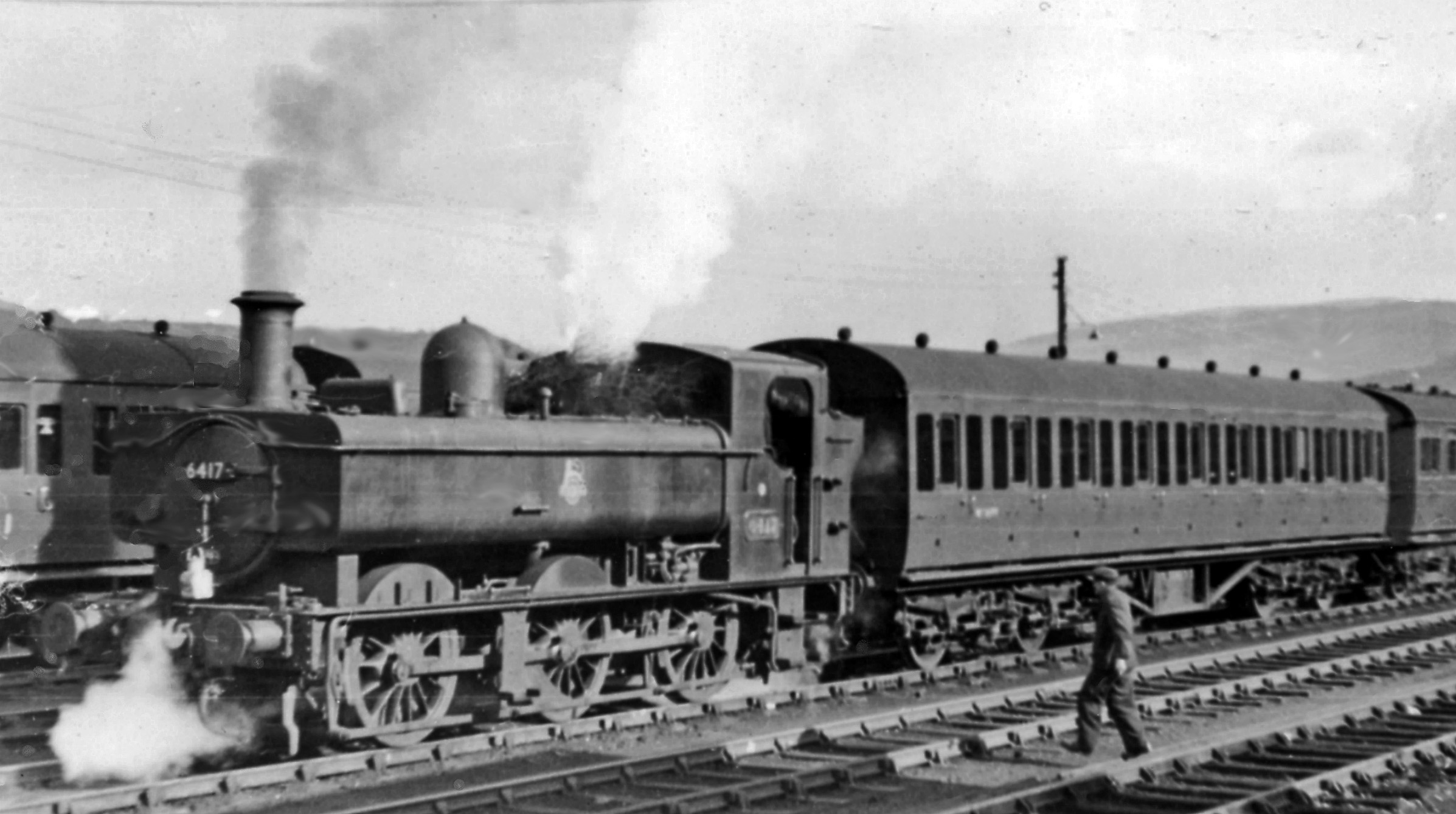
Abercynon branch train at Aberdare (Low Level) in 1954

The station at this location (the former Aberdare High Level) was opened in 1851 and was served by the trains of the Vale of Neath (VoN); it was served later by Great Western Railway on their route between Neath and Pontypool Road. The line from Abercynon and Cardiff had been built in 1846 by the Aberdare Railway Company (later absorbed by the Taff Vale Railway) - this ran to an adjacent but separate station at Aberdare Low Level, although the two routes were later connected to each other a short distance to the west of the town at Gadlys Junction.

Passenger rail services into the town on both lines fell victim to the Beeching Axe in 1964, with the last train running on the former VoN line on 13 June. and over the ex-TVR line from Cardiff on 30 October However part of the VoN line west of the town remained open for coal trains serving Tower Colliery at Hirwaun, which was then accessed by the former Taff Vale line. This was also retained to serve various collieries and a coking plant further down the valley at Abercwmboi; from 1968 though, this route was reduced to single track to reduce maintenance costs.

Goods traffic through the ex-VoN High Level station ended in 1965 and the line fell into disuse. In August 1973, it was reopened to release the former TVR line trackbed and station site for road improvements (including the removal of an inconveniently-located level crossing; the town's bus station now occupies the site. All services were diverted onto the old VoN line via a new connection between the two lines near Cwmbach and then on through the old High Level station to regain their former route at Gadlys Junction. The new connection was carried over the River Cynon on a girder bridge that had previously been used to carry the defunct Princes Risborough to Oxford branch line across the A40 road at Wheatley, Oxfordshire.

The fact that the line remained open made it possible to reinstate passenger services to the town, which started again under British Rail and Mid Glamorgan in October 1988 using a new platform close to the old disused one (the old High Level station building still survives and can be seen from the current station). Freight continued to run several times a day from the colliery over track owned by it, until Tower Colliery's final closure on 18 January 2008. English, Welsh & Scottish Railway still ran trains to the Tower washery on Wednesday, Thursday, Friday and Saturday for some time afterwards to clear coal stocks from the site; these departed Aberdare at 7:00 pm on Wednesdays and 11:30 am on Thursdays, Fridays and Saturdays. Freightliner also operate stone trains to Tower, but this service varies.

Announced in November 2009, the Welsh Assembly Government asked Network Rail to conduct a feasibility study on reopening the line to Hirwaun for passenger services. Network Rail is expected to clear the line of vegetation and assess the track bed before publishing its report in 2010, before any business cases to reopen the line is then developed.

== Proposals and future ==
It was announced in March 2011 that the Welsh Assembly Government's 2011-12 capital programme would include the reopening of the line to Hirwaun as part of the Cynon Valley Scheme; however, the project appears to have advanced little at that time. In 2019–2020, Cardiff Capital Region City Deal's Transport Authority secured £100,000 of funding from the Welsh Government's Local Transport Fund to undertake Welsh Transport Appraisal Guidance (WelTAG) 1 study into the feasibility of extending Aberdare Line passenger services through reopened Trecynon Halt and Hirwaun stations to a new terminus serving the Tower strategic development site.

Plans authorised in 2024, to add a second platform as part of the South Wales Metro project, were completed and opened on 18 May 2025 for arrivals, with departures continuing from platform 1.

== Facilities ==
Along with other stations on the Merthyr Line, Aberdare has undergone construction work to lengthen the platform. This now allows four-car trains to stop at the station. The platform also has a staffed ticket counter, which is open six days per week from early morning until mid-afternoon. Train running information is offered via CIS displays, a help point and timetable posters. Car parking is provided at the station.

The high level station building is being restored to become a bistro cafe for students, staff and the public, as part of the new Coleg y Cymoedd campus.

== Passenger volume ==
Passenger Volume at Aberdare
| | 2019-20 | 2020-21 | 2021-22 | 2022-23 |
|---|---|---|---|---|
| Entries and exits | 504,622 | 53,668 | 177350 | 226,714 |

== Services ==
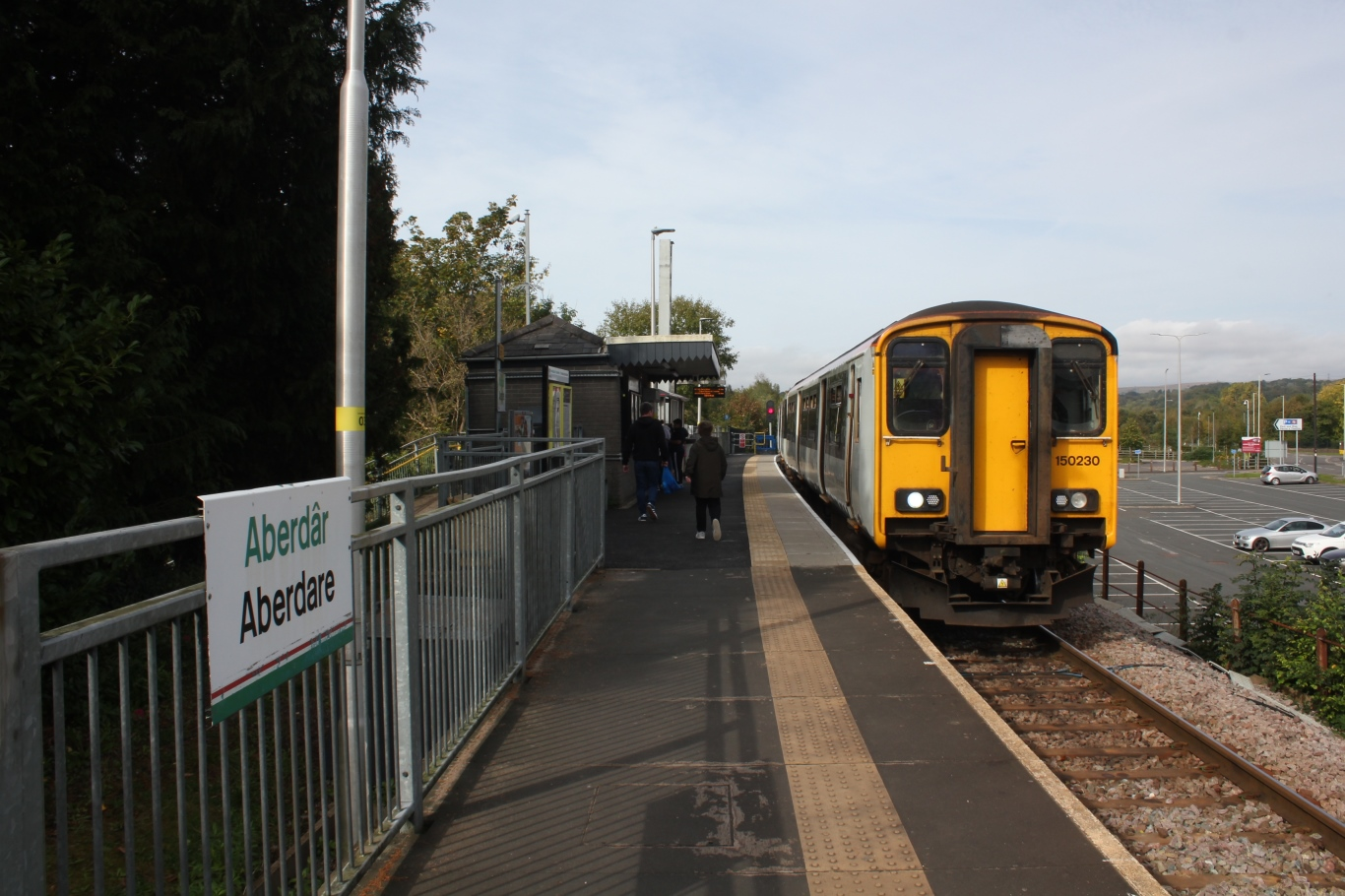
A train to Barry Island at Aberdare

On Mondays to Saturday daytimes, the service from Aberdare is a half-hourly to Merthyr Tydfil, via Cardiff Central. In the evenings, this drops to hourly. On Sundays, there is an hourly service to Cardiff Central. Services are formed of Class 150 Sprinter units.

The improved service was due to a campaign by the local Assembly Member and a successful trial in December 2017. The extra services began in April 2018.

There was a dedicated rail linc bus that linked with the railway service. It was only available to rail passengers and operated to Penywaun, Hirwaun, Cefn Rhigos and Rhigos. The rail link bus no longer operates, but tickets are valid for use on Stagecoach South Wales routes that serve the aforementioned communities. Plans are being developed to reintroduce passenger rail services to Trecynon and Hirwaun.

| Preceding station | National Rail | Following station |
|---|---|---|
| Cwmbach | Transport for Wales; Aberdare Branch | Terminus |
| | Disused railways | |
| Cwmbach; Line and station open | Great Western Railway; Vale of Neath Railway | Trecynon Halt; Line and station closed |
