= Merthyr Tydfil railway station =

Railway station in Merthyr Tydfil, Wales

Merthyr Tydfil Welsh: Merthyr Tudful
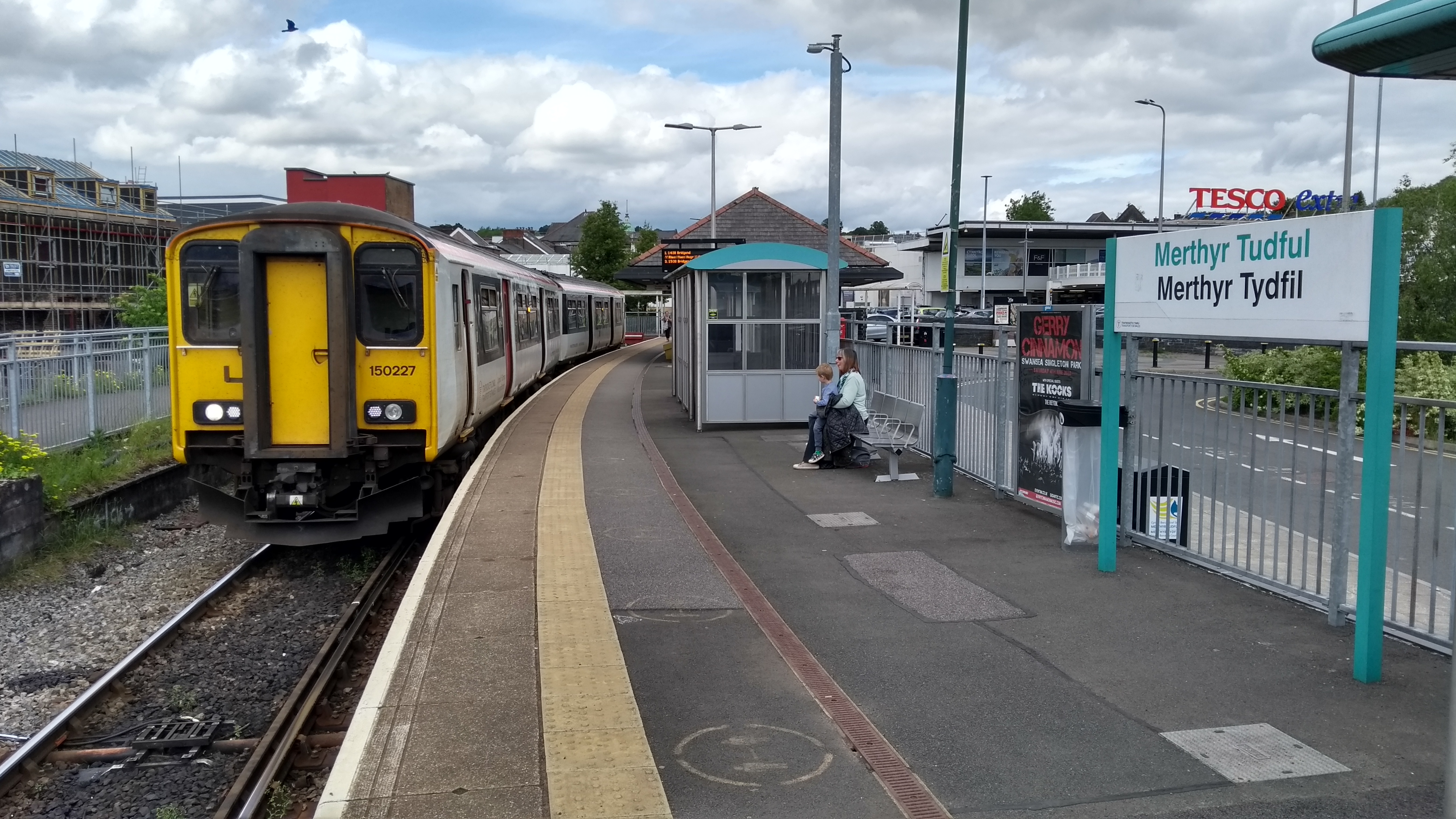
- Merthyr Tydfil railway station in 2022

General information
- Location: Merthyr Tydfil County Borough; Wales
- Coordinates: 51.7444°N 3.3773°W
- Grid reference: SO050059
- Manager: Transport for Wales
- Platforms: 1

Other information
- Station code: MER
- Classification: DfT category E

History
- Opened: 2 November 1853

Passengers
- 2020/21: ▼70,798
- 2021/22: ▲0.235 million
- 2022/23: ▲0.279 million
- 2023/24: ▲0.285 million
- 2024/25: ▲0.413 million
Location
Notes
- Passenger statistics from the Office of Rail and Road

Merthyr Tydfil railway station serves the town of Merthyr Tydfil in Wales. It is the northern terminus of the Merthyr branch of the Merthyr Line. Passenger services are provided by Transport for Wales. The station has one platform and is situated near to the Tesco supermarket in the town.

Since the spring 2009 timetable change, trains are able to arrive/depart from the station every half hour after the commissioning of a passing loop near Merthyr Vale.

== History ==
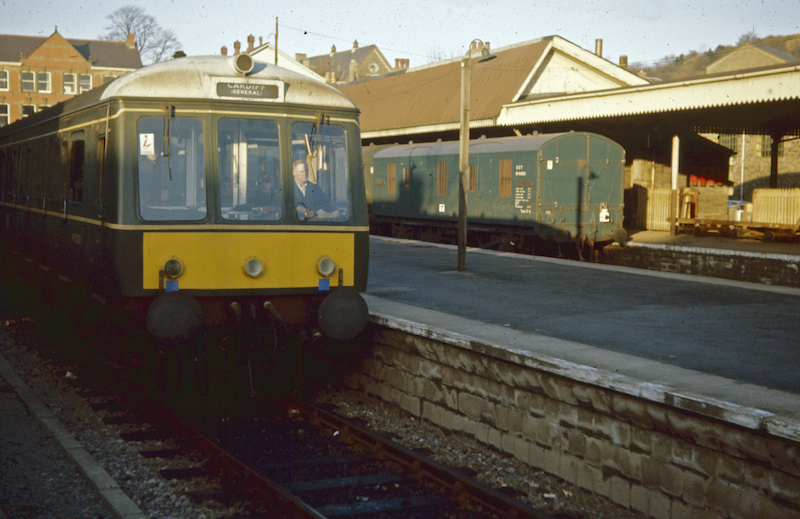
Merthyr Tydfil station in January 1968, before its first relocation

The first station in Merthyr was opened by the Taff Vale Railway on 21 April 1841 in Plymouth Street. This was the second stage of the building of the main line from Navigation House (later Abercynon). The station was closed on 1 August 1877, when all Taff Vale passenger traffic was diverted to the Great Western Railway station at Merthyr High Street.

In 1853, Merthyr High Street railway station opened as the terminus of the Vale of Neath Railway on the site. Designed by Isambard Kingdom Brunel, the two platform station encompassed 7 ft (2,134 mm) broad gauge lines and was enclosed by an overall roof. The Vale of Neath also encompassed the Swansea and Neath Railway, enabling trains to run to Swansea docks; after amalgamation with the Great Western Railway on 1 February 1865, through trains ran to London Paddington.

Although other railways which ran into Merthyr had their own stations, after a third rail was added to the whole of the Vale of Neath system in 1863, the mixed gauge allowed them all to consolidate their services at Merthyr High Street:

- Great Western Railway: trains from Hereford through to Swansea over a connection at Middle Duffryn
- Taff Vale: to Cardiff (transferred from their own Plymouth Street terminus in 1877)
- Brecon & Merthyr: onwards to Brecon
- Rhymney Railway
- London & North Western: to the Midlands (via Brynmawr and Abergavenny) and Swansea
- Cambrian Railways: Cardiff/Treherbert service to Aberystwyth via the Brecon & Merthyr route

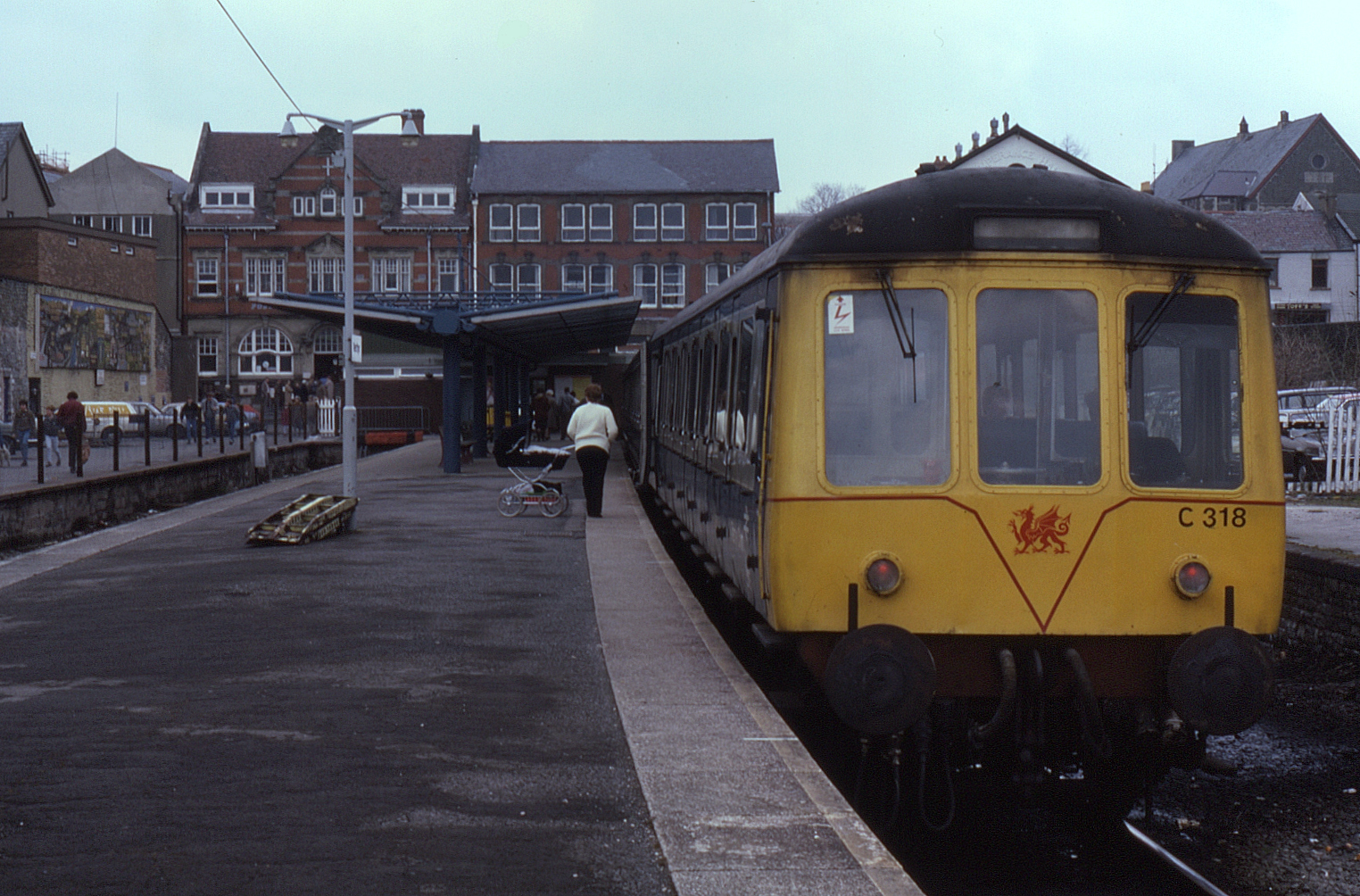
The station in 1986

After the whole of the Great Western system was converted to standard gauge on 11 May 1872, a thin central platform was later added to the station, adding two additional platforms.

After the end of the steam era and the closure of all but the Taff Vale lines into the station between 1951 and 1964, the passenger facilities were rebuilt by British Rail on the south-west corner of the original site in 1974; it became a single island providing two platforms. A further rebuild in 1996 saw it reduced to its present single platform configuration, with a Tesco superstore and other retail outlets now occupying the rest of the old station site.

== Facilities ==
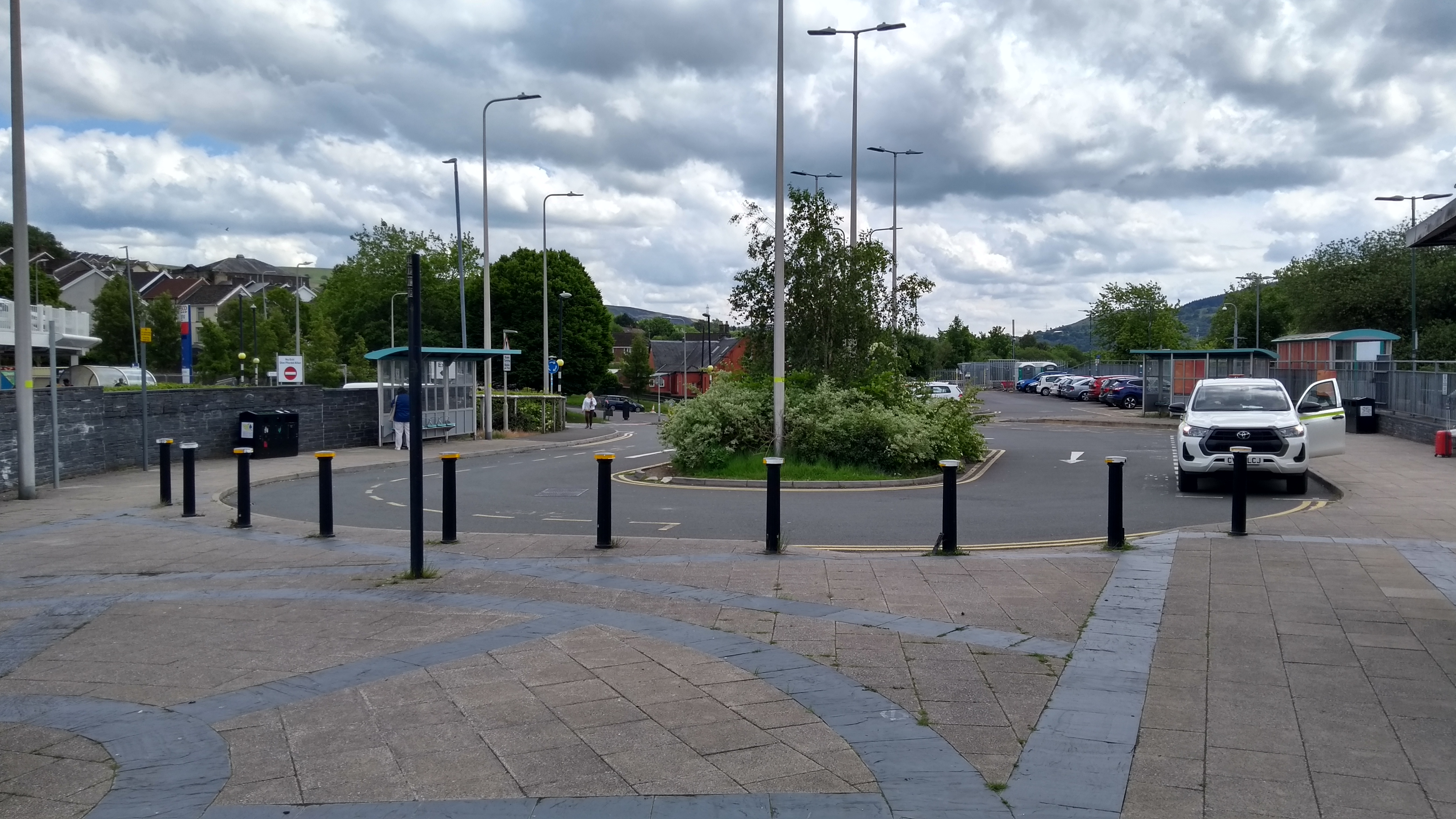
Station access road (2022)

The station has a small car park, ticket office, passenger display panels and a taxi rank. Passengers wishing to use buses to other destinations have to walk through the town to the main bus station.

== Services ==
The station has a half-hourly service to and from Aberdare, via Cardiff Central on weekdays and Saturdays. On Sundays, there is an hourly service to Cardiff Central.

Preceding station	National Rail	Following station
Pentre-bach	Transport for Wales; Merthyr branch	Terminus
	Disused railways	
Merthyr (Plymouth Street); Line and station closed	Great Western Railway; Vale of Neath Railway	Terminus
