= List of railway stations in Wales =

Map showing the location of Wales within the United Kingdom

This is a list of railway stations in Wales, one of the four countries of the United Kingdom. It includes all railway stations in Wales that form part of the British National Rail network that currently have timetabled train services. It does not include stations on heritage railways, except for those shared with the National Rail network.

The main operator is Transport for Wales who run almost all services in Wales. However Great Western Railway operates the South Wales-London service, CrossCountry operates long-distance services to Central and North East England from Cardiff Central and Newport, and Avanti West Coast run from North Wales-West Midlands-London.

The main rail routes in Wales include:

- London–South Wales
- Cardiff–Newport–Wrexham–Holyhead/Manchester
- Valley Lines urban network
- London–Holyhead/Bangor/Wrexham

The table includes, where known, the year that each station was opened. Detailed records are not always available, and some stations, particularly in the South Wales Valleys area, were operated as halts for workmen, and public services only appeared later. Additionally, some station names have appeared with several variations, often changing from English to Welsh or vice versa.

The station usage 2007/08 shows that 40,118,437 rail journeys begun and/or finished in Wales that year compared with 36,466,308 the previous year, a rise of 10%.

== Stations ==
The following table lists the name of each station in English and Welsh, along with the year it first opened, and the unitary authority area in which it is situated. The table also shows the train operators who currently serve each station and the final two columns give information on the number of passengers using each station in recent years, as collated by the Office of Rail Regulation, a Government body. The figures are based on ticket sales and are given to the nearest 100.

Station English/Welsh	Year opened	Unitary authority area	Served by	Station users 2017–18	Station users 2018–19
Aber	1908^{[a]}	Caerphilly	Transport for Wales	251,000	284,000
Abercynon	1840^{[b]}	Rhondda Cynon Taf	Transport for Wales	298,000	330,000
Aberdare; Aberdâr	1988	Rhondda Cynon Taf	Transport for Wales	572,000	581,000
Aberdovey; Aberdyfi	1867	Gwynedd	Transport for Wales	37,700	40,400
Abererch	1867^{[c]}	Gwynedd	Transport for Wales	2,500	2,200
Abergavenny; Y Fenni	1854^{[d]}	Monmouthshire	Transport for Wales	437,000	508,000
Abergele and Pensarn; Abergele a Phen-sarn	1848	Conwy	Transport for Wales	70,100	73,800
Aberystwyth	1864	Ceredigion	Transport for Wales^{[e]}	335,000	310,000
Ammanford; Rhydaman	1841^{[f]}	Carmarthenshire	Transport for Wales	19,900	19,600
Baglan	1996	Neath Port Talbot	Transport for Wales	23,700	24,300
Bangor	1848	Gwynedd	Avanti West Coast; Transport for Wales	662,000	667,000
Bargoed; Bargod	1858	Caerphilly	Transport for Wales	226,000	232,000
Barmouth; Abermaw	1867	Gwynedd	Transport for Wales	187,000	198,000
Barry; Y Barri	1889	Vale of Glamorgan	Transport for Wales	534,000	580,000
Barry Docks; Dociau'r Barri	1888	Vale of Glamorgan	Transport for Wales	246,000	277,000
Barry Island; Ynys y Barri	1896	Vale of Glamorgan	Transport for Wales^{[g]}	753,000	868,000
Betws-y-coed	1868	Conwy	Transport for Wales	35,300	35,400
Birchgrove; Llwynbedw	1929	Cardiff	Transport for Wales	54,600	76,700
Blaenau Ffestiniog	1883^{[h]}	Gwynedd	Transport for Wales^{[h]}	39,900	39,100
Bodorgan	1849	Anglesey	Transport for Wales	5,600	5,400
Borth	1863	Ceredigion	Transport for Wales	67,200	61,400
Bow Street	2021	Ceredigion	Transport for Wales^{[e]}	n/a	n/a
Bridgend; Pen-y-bont	1850	Bridgend	Great Western Railway; Transport for Wales	1,527,000	1,636,000
Brithdir	1871	Caerphilly	Transport for Wales	14,400	13,200
Briton Ferry; Llansawel	1994	Neath Port Talbot	Transport for Wales	33,900	38,800
Buckley; Bwcle	1890	Flintshire	Transport for Wales	41,000	40,600
Builth Road; Heol Llanfair-ym-Muallt	1866	Powys	Transport for Wales	7,500	7,100
Bynea; Bynie	1840	Carmarthenshire	Transport for Wales	2,200	2,700
Cadoxton; Tregatwg	1888	Vale of Glamorgan	Transport for Wales	282,000	291,000
Caergwrle	1872	Flintshire	Transport for Wales	17,800	19,100
Caerphilly; Caerffili	1858	Caerphilly	Transport for Wales	772,000	812,000
Caersws	1863	Powys	Transport for Wales	69,700	60,600
Caldicot; Cil-y-coed	1932	Monmouthshire	CrossCountry; Transport for Wales	101,000	111,000
Cardiff Bay; Bae Caerdydd	1844`	Cardiff	Transport for Wales	1,303,000	1,721,000
Cardiff Central; Caerdydd Canolog	1850	Cardiff	CrossCountry; Great Western Railway; Transport for Wales	12,952,000	14,205,000
Cardiff Queen Street; Caerdydd Heol y Frenhines	1840	Cardiff	Transport for Wales	2,912,000	3,432,000
Carmarthen; Caerfyrddin	1902	Carmarthenshire	Great Western Railway; Transport for Wales	417,000	386,000
Cathays	1983	Cardiff	Transport for Wales	946,000	1,159,000
Cefn-y-Bedd	1866	Flintshire	Transport for Wales	7,600	7,200
Chepstow; Cas-gwent	1850	Monmouthshire	CrossCountry; Transport for Wales	253,000	270,000
Chirk; Y Waun	1849	Wrexham	Transport for Wales	75,500	79,700
Cilmeri	1867	Powys	Transport for Wales	1,400	1,300
Clarbeston Road	1854	Pembrokeshire	Transport for Wales	7,800	7,200
Clunderwen	1854	Pembrokeshire	Transport for Wales	24,500	22,100
Cogan	1888	Vale of Glamorgan	Transport for Wales	310,000	346,000
Colwyn Bay; Bae Colwyn	1849	Conwy	Avanti West Coast; Transport for Wales	269,000	281,000
Conwy	1848	Conwy	Transport for Wales	57,000	64,400
Coryton	1911^{[i]}	Cardiff	Transport for Wales	195,000	217,000
Criccieth; Cricieth	1867	Gwynedd	Transport for Wales	27,500	27,500
Crosskeys	1962	Caerphilly	Transport for Wales	123,000	121,000
Cwmbach	1914	Rhondda Cynon Taf	Transport for Wales	27,400	30,500
Cwmbran; Cwmbrân	1986	Torfaen	Transport for Wales	400,000	466,000
Cynghordy	1868	Carmarthenshire	Transport for Wales	1,200	1,000
Danescourt	1987	Cardiff	Transport for Wales	108,000	133,000
Deganwy	1868	Conwy	Transport for Wales	11,000	12,800
Dinas Powys	1888	Vale of Glamorgan	Transport for Wales	93,400	100,000
Dinas Rhondda	1863	Rhondda Cynon Taf	Transport for Wales	52,800	52,000
Dingle Road; Heol Dingle	1904	Vale of Glamorgan	Transport for Wales	139,000	192,000
Dolau	1865	Powys	Transport for Wales	1,400	1,300
Dolgarrog	1916	Conwy	Transport for Wales	600	800
Dolwyddelan	1879	Conwy	Transport for Wales	3,400	3,800
Dovey Junction; Cyffordd Dyfi	1863	Powys	Transport for Wales	4,400	4,600
Dyffryn Ardudwy	1867	Gwynedd	Transport for Wales	16,600	15,100
Eastbrook	1986	Vale of Glamorgan	Transport for Wales	168,000	196,000
Ebbw Vale Parkway; Parcffordd Glyn Ebwy	2008	Blaenau Gwent	Transport for Wales	53,200	41,200
Ebbw Vale Town; Tref Glyn Ebwy	2015	Blaenau Gwent	Transport for Wales	245,000	256,000
Energlyn & Churchill Park; Eneu'r-glyn a Pharc Churchill	2013	Caerphilly	Transport for Wales	101,000	130,000
Fairbourne	1897	Gwynedd	Transport for Wales^{[j]}	40,500	41,400
Fairwater; Y Tyllgoed	1987	Cardiff	Transport for Wales	89,300	102,000
Fernhill	1988	Rhondda Cynon Taf	Transport for Wales	26,100	24,000
Ferryside; Glanyfferi	1852	Carmarthenshire	Transport for Wales	20,100	19,600
Ffairfach	1852	Carmarthenshire	Transport for Wales	2,700	2,400
Fishguard & Goodwick; Abergwaun ac Wdig	1899	Pembrokeshire	Transport for Wales	20,100	19,800
Fishguard Harbour^{[k]} Porthladd Abergwaun	1906	Pembrokeshire	Transport for Wales	17,000	14,000
Flint; Y Fflint	1848	Flintshire	Avanti West Coast; Transport for Wales	258,000	278,000
Garth (Bridgend); Garth (Pen-y-bont)	1992	Bridgend	Transport for Wales	12,500	18,800
Garth (Powys)	1868	Powys	Transport for Wales	1,000	1,300
Gilfach Fargoed	1908	Caerphilly	Transport for Wales	5,200	4,400
Glan Conwy	1863	Conwy	Transport for Wales	3,200	3,900
Gowerton; Tre-gŵyr	1854	Swansea	Transport for Wales	174,000	209,000
Grangetown	1882	Cardiff	Transport for Wales	197,000	224,000
Gwersyllt	1845	Wrexham	Transport for Wales	26,800	24,500
Harlech	1867	Gwynedd	Transport for Wales	124,000	135,000
Haverfordwest; Hwlffordd	1854	Pembrokeshire	Transport for Wales	133,000	124,000
Hawarden; Penarlâg	1890	Flintshire	Transport for Wales	32,600	33,400
Hawarden Bridge; Pont Penarlâg	1924	Flintshire	Transport for Wales	3,300	3,700
Heath High Level; Lefel Uchaf y Mynydd Bychan	1915	Cardiff	Transport for Wales	441,000	513,000
Heath Low Level; Lefel Isel y Mynydd Bychan	1911	Cardiff	Transport for Wales	68,500	96,700
Hengoed	1858	Caerphilly	Transport for Wales	165,000	186,000
Holyhead; Caergybi	1848^{[l]}	Anglesey	Avanti West Coast; Transport for Wales	220,000	217,000
Hope; Yr Hob	1866	Flintshire	Transport for Wales	24,600	21,800
Johnston	1856	Pembrokeshire	Transport for Wales	9,000	8,300
Kidwelly; Cydweli	1852	Carmarthenshire	Transport for Wales	28,200	28,700
Kilgetty; Cilgeti	1866	Pembrokeshire	Transport for Wales	16,400	15,700
Knucklas; Cnwclas	1865	Powys	Transport for Wales	3,500	3,500
Lamphey; Llandyfai	1863	Pembrokeshire	Great Western Railway; Transport for Wales	4,900	5,100
Lisvane & Thornhill; Llys-faen a Draenen Pen-y-graig	1986	Cardiff	Transport for Wales	216,000	264,000
Llanaber	1911	Gwynedd	Transport for Wales	3,300	2,900
Llanbedr	1923	Gwynedd	Transport for Wales	11,300	12,400
Llanbister Road; Heol Llanbister	1865	Powys	Transport for Wales	1,000	900
Llanbradach	1858	Caerphilly	Transport for Wales	98,700	111,000
Llandaf ^{[s]}	1840	Cardiff	Transport for Wales	483,000	604,000
Llandanwg	1929	Gwynedd	Transport for Wales	4,300	4,700
Llandecwyn	1930	Gwynedd	Transport for Wales	1,900	1,700
Llandeilo	1857	Carmarthenshire	Transport for Wales	19,500	19,300
Llandovery; Llanymddyfri	1858	Carmarthenshire	Transport for Wales	16,700	15,800
Llandrindod	1865	Powys	Transport for Wales	40,100	40,700
Llandudno	1858	Conwy	Avanti West Coast; Transport for Wales	305,000	312,000
Llandudno Junction; Cyffordd Llandudno	1858^{[m]}	Conwy	Avanti West Coast; Transport for Wales	317,000	325,000
Llandybie; Llandybïe	1857	Carmarthenshire	Transport for Wales	10,800	9,600
Llanelli	1842	Carmarthenshire	Great Western Railway; Transport for Wales	401,000	400,000
Llanfairfechan	1860	Conwy	Transport for Wales	14,000	16,400
Llanfairpwll ^{[n]}	1848	Anglesey	Transport for Wales	20,600	21,200
Llangadog	1858	Carmarthenshire	Transport for Wales	5,600	5,000
Llangammarch; Llangamarch	1867	Powys	Transport for Wales	1,800	1,800
Llangennech	1841	Carmarthenshire	Transport for Wales	3,400	3,600
Llangynllo	1865	Powys	Transport for Wales	800	800
Llanharan	2007	Rhondda Cynon Taf	Transport for Wales	176,000	204,000
Llanhilleth; Llanhiledd	2008	Blaenau Gwent	Transport for Wales	84,300	78,600
Llanishen; Llanisien	1871	Cardiff	Transport for Wales	270,000	334,000
Llanrwst	1989	Conwy	Transport for Wales	12,600	13,800
Llansamlet	1885	Swansea	Transport for Wales	31,800	34,100
Llantwit Major; Llanilltud Fawr	2005	Vale of Glamorgan	Transport for Wales	298,000	331,000
Llanwrda	1858	Carmarthenshire	Transport for Wales	2,100	1,800
Llanwrtyd	1867	Powys	Transport for Wales	7,300	7,400
Llwyngwril	1863	Gwynedd	Transport for Wales	28,600	31,600
Llwynypia	1863	Rhondda Cynon Taf	Transport for Wales	61,700	55,700
Machynlleth	1863	Powys	Transport for Wales	138,000	131,000
Maesteg	1864	Bridgend	Transport for Wales	192,000	188,000
Maesteg (Ewenny Road); Maesteg (Heol Ewenni)	1992	Bridgend	Transport for Wales	5,500	6,600
Manorbier; Maenorbŷr	1863	Pembrokeshire	Transport for Wales	9,300	9,100
Merthyr Tydfil; Merthyr Tudful	1853^{[o]}	Merthyr Tydfil	Transport for Wales	512,000	516,000
Merthyr Vale; Ynysowen	1883	Merthyr Tydfil	Transport for Wales	49,600	47,100
Milford Haven; Aberdaugleddau	1863	Pembrokeshire	Transport for Wales	62,800	59,300
Minffordd	1872	Gwynedd	Transport for Wales^{[p]}	17,200	16,800
Morfa Mawddach	1865	Gwynedd	Transport for Wales	11,400	11,900
Mountain Ash; Aberpennar	1846	Rhondda Cynon Taf	Transport for Wales	99,700	100,000
Narberth; Arberth	1866	Pembrokeshire	Transport for Wales	19,000	19,000
Neath; Castell-nedd	1877	Neath Port Talbot	Great Western Railway; Transport for Wales	817,000	882,000
Newbridge; Trecelyn	2008	Caerphilly	Transport for Wales	135,000	142,000
Newport; Casnewydd	1850	Newport	CrossCountry; Great Western Railway; Transport for Wales	2,697,000	2,846,000
Newtown (Powys); Y Drenewydd	1861	Powys	Transport for Wales	185,000	185,000
Ninian Park; Parc Ninian	1987	Cardiff	Transport for Wales	127,000	135,000
North Llanrwst; Gogledd Llanrwst	1863	Conwy	Transport for Wales	1,900	2,600
Pantyffynnon	1835	Carmarthenshire	Transport for Wales	3,300	3,600
Pembrey and Burry Port; Pen-bre a Phorth Tywyn	1852	Carmarthenshire	Great Western Railway; Transport for Wales	138,000	136,000
Pembroke; Penfro	1863	Pembrokeshire	Transport for Wales	31,100	32,600
Pembroke Dock; Doc Penfro	1864	Pembrokeshire	Transport for Wales	46,200	47,900
Penally; Penalun	1972	Pembrokeshire	Transport for Wales	5,200	5,100
Penarth	1878	Vale of Glamorgan	Transport for Wales	627,000	739,000
Pencoed	1850	Bridgend	Transport for Wales	238,000	282,000
Pengam	1858	Caerphilly	Transport for Wales	461,000	507,000
Penhelig	1933	Gwynedd	Transport for Wales	8,600	8,900
Penmaenmawr	1848	Conwy	Transport for Wales	11,700	12,800
Penrhiwceiber	1883	Rhondda Cynon Taf	Transport for Wales	44,800	44,100
Penrhyndeudraeth	1867	Gwynedd	Transport for Wales	56,200	57,100
Pensarn (Gwynedd)		Gwynedd	Transport for Wales	2,700	2,700
Pentre-bach	1886	Merthyr Tydfil	Transport for Wales	27,000	26,500
Pen-y-bont	1865	Powys	Transport for Wales	1,800	1,900
Penychain	1933	Gwynedd	Transport for Wales	4,100	3,600
Penyffordd; Pen-y-ffordd	1877	Flintshire	Transport for Wales	20,700	22,400
Pontarddulais	1840	Swansea	Transport for Wales	4,800	5,400
Pontlottyn; Pontlotyn	1859	Caerphilly	Transport for Wales	18,200	18,700
Pontyclun; Pont-y-clun	1850	Rhondda Cynon Taf	Transport for Wales	306,000	366,000
Pont-y-Pant	1879	Conwy	Transport for Wales	800	900
Pontypool and New Inn; Pont-y-pŵl a New Inn	1852	Torfaen	Transport for Wales	77,000	111,000
Pontypridd	1840	Rhondda Cynon Taf	Transport for Wales	864,000	934,000
Port Talbot Parkway; Parcffordd Port Talbot	1850	Neath Port Talbot	Great Western Railway; Transport for Wales	517,000	547,000
Porth; Y Porth	1876	Rhondda Cynon Taf	Transport for Wales	355,000	373,000
Porthmadog	1867	Gwynedd	Transport for Wales^{[q]}	70,900	73,100
Prestatyn	1848	Denbighshire	Avanti West Coast; Transport for Wales	333,000	334,000
Pwllheli	1869	Gwynedd	Transport for Wales	76,500	76,200
Pyle; Y Pîl	1850	Bridgend	Transport for Wales	125,000	147,000
Pye Corner	2014	Newport	Transport for Wales	96,700	126,000
Quakers Yard; Mynwent-y-Crynwyr	1841	Merthyr Tydfil	Transport for Wales	66,000	71,200
Radyr; Radur	1863	Cardiff	Transport for Wales	539,000	736,000
Rhiwbina	1911	Cardiff	Transport for Wales	103,000	155,000
Rhoose Cardiff International Airport; Maes Awyr Rhyngwladol Caerdydd Y Rhws	2005	Vale of Glamorgan	Transport for Wales	178,000	197,000
Rhosneigr	1907	Anglesey	Transport for Wales	11,600	10,800
Rhyl; Y Rhyl	1848	Denbighshire	Avanti West Coast; Transport for Wales	520,000	520,000
Rhymney; Rhymni	1858	Caerphilly	Transport for Wales	181,000	192,000
Risca and Pontymister; Rhisga a Phont-y-meistr	2008	Caerphilly	Transport for Wales	99,300	102,000
Rogerstone; Tŷ-du	2008	Newport	Transport for Wales	90,600	100,000
Roman Bridge; Pont Rufeinig	1879	Conwy	Transport for Wales	900	1,100
Ruabon; Rhiwabon	1846	Wrexham	Transport for Wales	96,000	103,000
Sarn	1992	Bridgend	Transport for Wales	58,800	63,300
Saundersfoot	1866	Pembrokeshire	Great Western Railway; Transport for Wales	8,000	8,300
Severn Tunnel Junction; Cyffordd Twnnel Hafren	1886	Monmouthshire	CrossCountry; Great Western Railway; Transport for Wales	267,000	240,000
Shotton	1891	Flintshire	Transport for Wales	215,000	224,000
Skewen; Sgiwen	1882	Neath Port Talbot	Transport for Wales	41,700	43,900
Sugar Loaf; Dinas y Bwlch	1868	Powys	Transport for Wales	1,800	700
Swansea; Abertawe	1850	Swansea	Great Western Railway; Transport for Wales	2,159,000	2,204,000
Taffs Well; Ffynnon Taf	1863	Rhondda Cynon Taf	Transport for Wales	364,000	429,000
Talsarnau	1867	Gwynedd	Transport for Wales	5,400	5,900
Talybont; Taffs Well	1914	Gwynedd	Transport for Wales	26,900	25,300
Tal-y-Cafn; Tal-y-cafn	1863	Conwy	Transport for Wales	1,100	1,400
Tenby; Dinbych-y-pysgod	1863	Pembrokeshire	Transport for Wales	123,000	125,000
Tir-Phil	1858	Caerphilly	Transport for Wales	23,600	25,200
Tondu	1864	Bridgend	Transport for Wales	48,900	51,500
Tonfanau	1895	Gwynedd	Transport for Wales	3,300	3,100
Ton Pentre; Tonpentre	1861	Rhondda Cynon Taf	Transport for Wales	79,900	75,500
Tonypandy	1908	Rhondda Cynon Taf	Transport for Wales	111,000	105,000
Treforest; Trefforest	1845	Rhondda Cynon Taf	Transport for Wales	752,000	791,000
Treforest Estate; Ystad Trefforest	1942	Rhondda Cynon Taf	Transport for Wales	83,700	86,100
Trehafod	1841	Rhondda Cynon Taf	Transport for Wales	38,400	40,300
Treherbert	1901	Rhondda Cynon Taf	Transport for Wales	486,000	464,000
Treorchy; Treorci	1884	Rhondda Cynon Taf	Transport for Wales	170,000	159,000
Troed-y-rhiw	1841	Merthyr Tydfil	Transport for Wales	38,800	42,700
Ty Croes	1848	Anglesey	Transport for Wales	4,300	3,600
Ty Glas; Tŷ Glas	1987	Cardiff	Transport for Wales	207,000	228,000
Tygwyn	1927	Gwynedd	Transport for Wales	1,600	1,300
Tywyn	1863	Gwynedd	Transport for Wales^{[r]}	102,000	105,000
Valley; Y Dyffryn	1849	Anglesey	Transport for Wales	14,700	14,500
Waun-gron Park; Parc Waun-gron	1987	Cardiff	Transport for Wales	96,800	127,000
Welshpool; Y Trallwng	1862	Powys	Transport for Wales	180,000	183,000
Whitchurch (Cardiff); Yr Eglwys Newydd	1911	Cardiff	Transport for Wales	25,400	33,700
Whitland; Hendy-gwyn ar Daf	1854	Carmarthenshire	Transport for Wales	48,100	45,200
Wildmill; Melin Wyllt	1992	Bridgend	Transport for Wales	26,300	31,400
Wrexham Central; Wrecsam Canolog	1887	Wrexham	Transport for Wales	88,600	81,800
Wrexham General; Wrecsam Cyffredinol	1846	Wrexham	Avanti West Coast; Transport for Wales	492,000	530,000
Ynyswen	1986	Rhondda Cynon Taf	Transport for Wales	12,800	11,600
Ystrad Mynach	1858	Caerphilly	Transport for Wales	377,000	410,000
Ystrad Rhondda	1986	Rhondda Cynon Taf	Transport for Wales	52,500	52,600

== Gallery ==
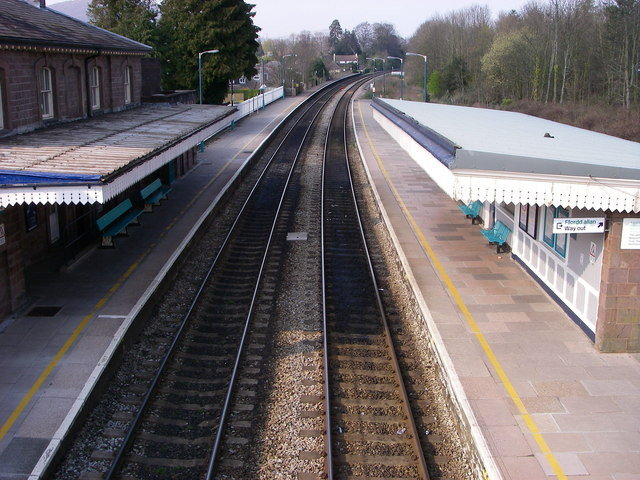
Abergavenny - Gateway to the Brecon Beacons

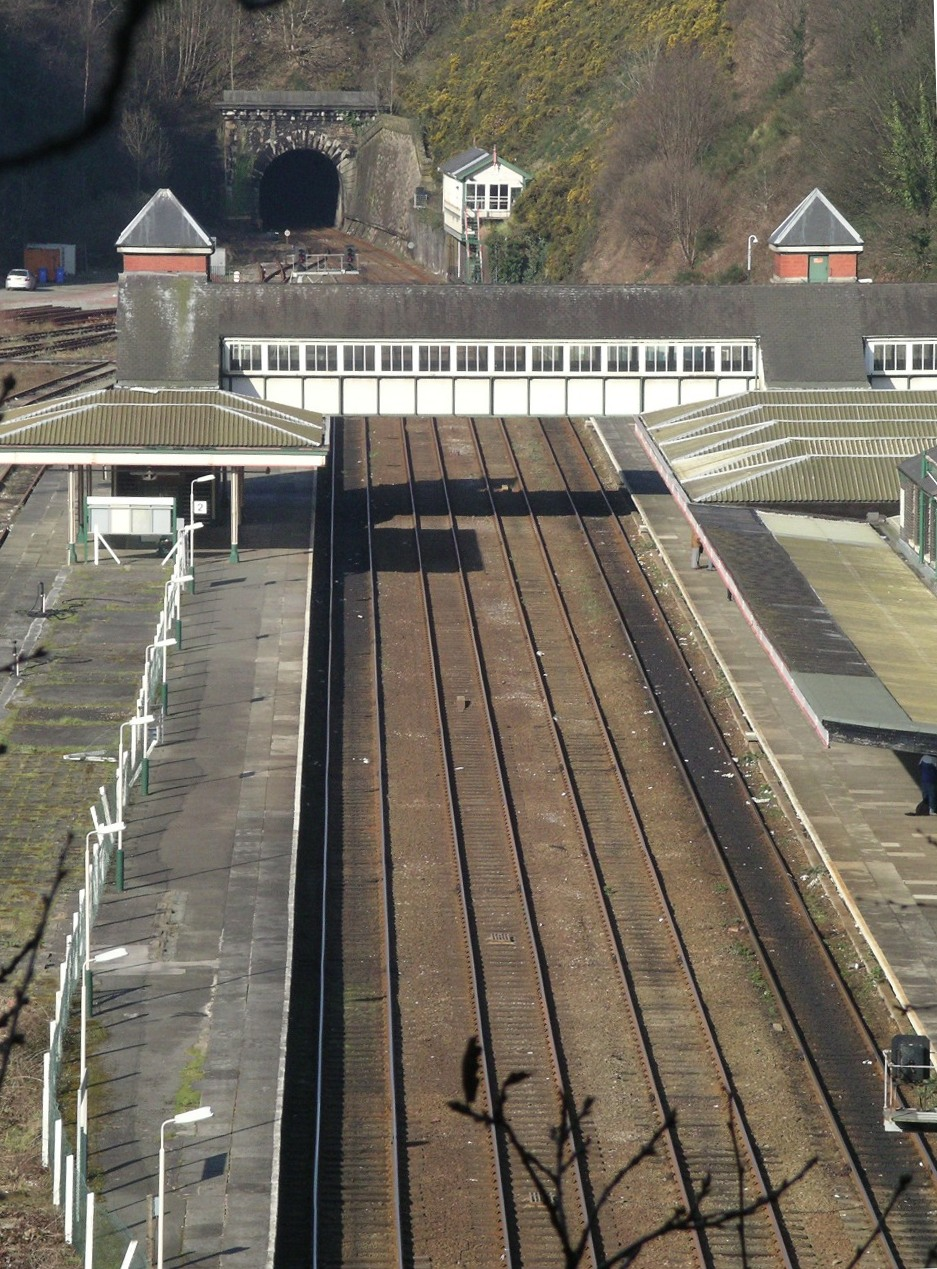
Bangor - Last mainland station on the North Wales Coast Line

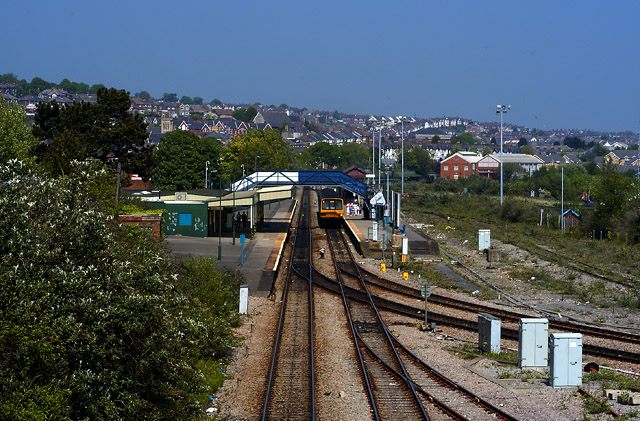
Barry - The largest of three stations serving the seaside town

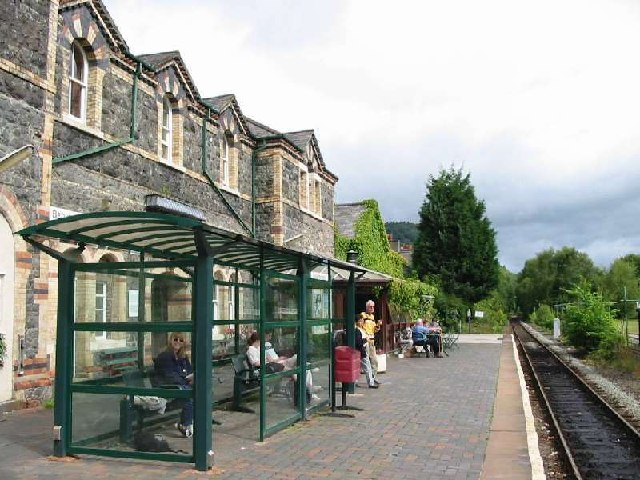
Betws-y-Coed - Gateway to Snowdonia

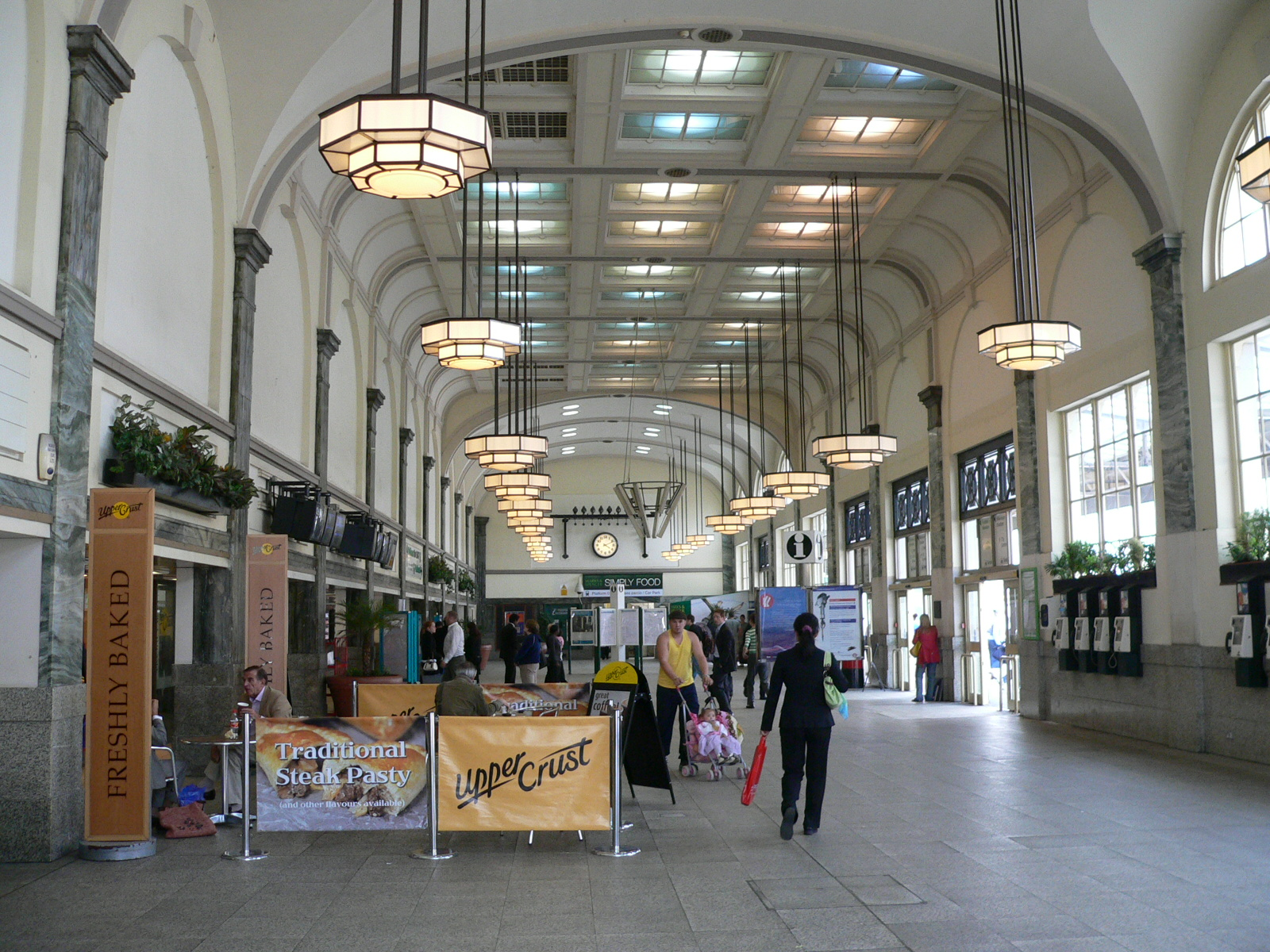
Cardiff Central - Largest and busiest in Wales

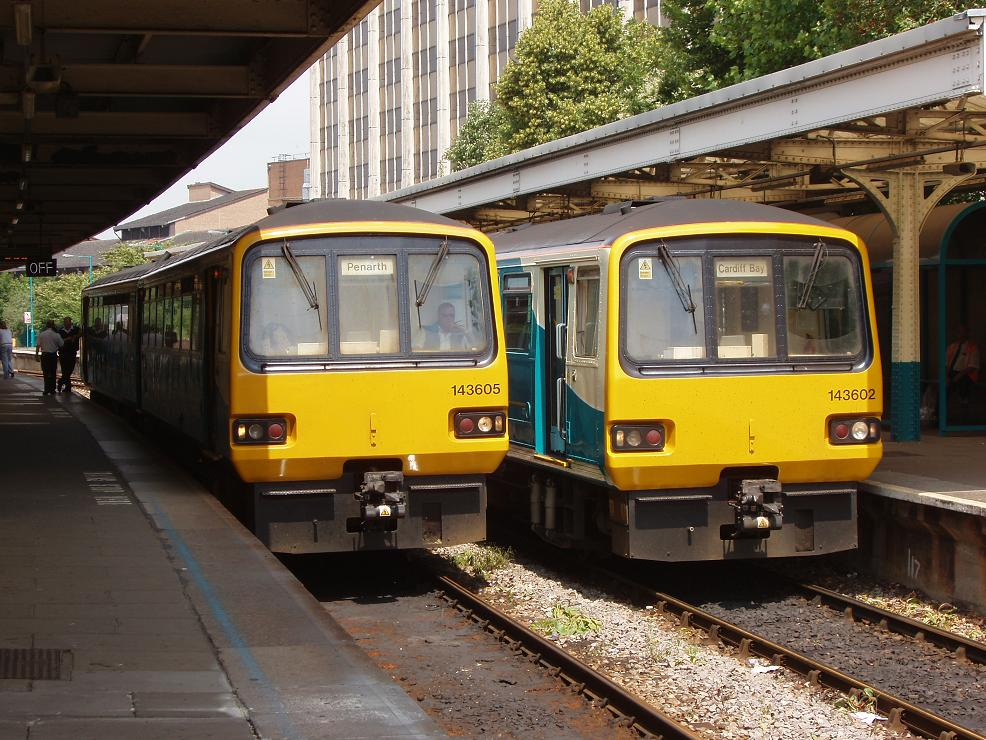
Cardiff Queen Street - Second busiest in Wales and important hub in the city

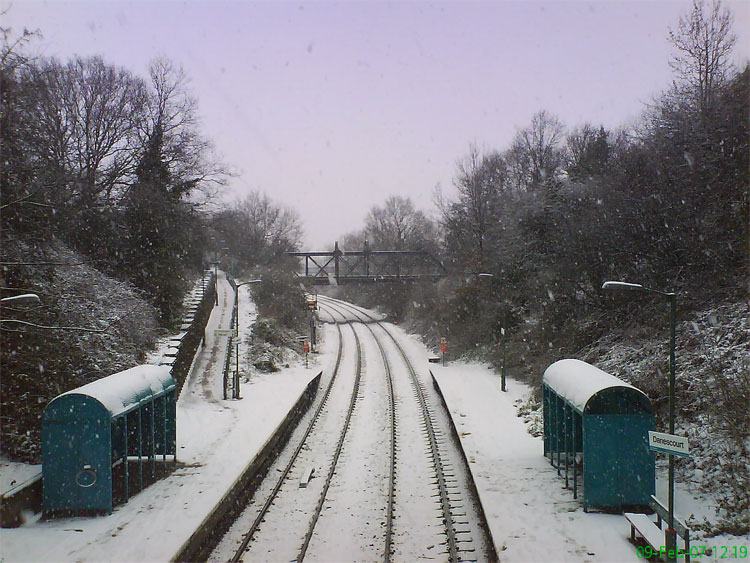
Danescourt - On the Valley Lines network serving the Cardiff suburb

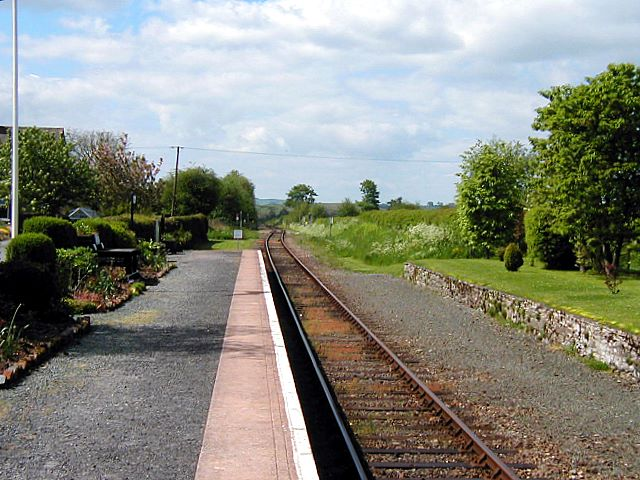
Dolau - Visited by Queen Elizabeth in 2002

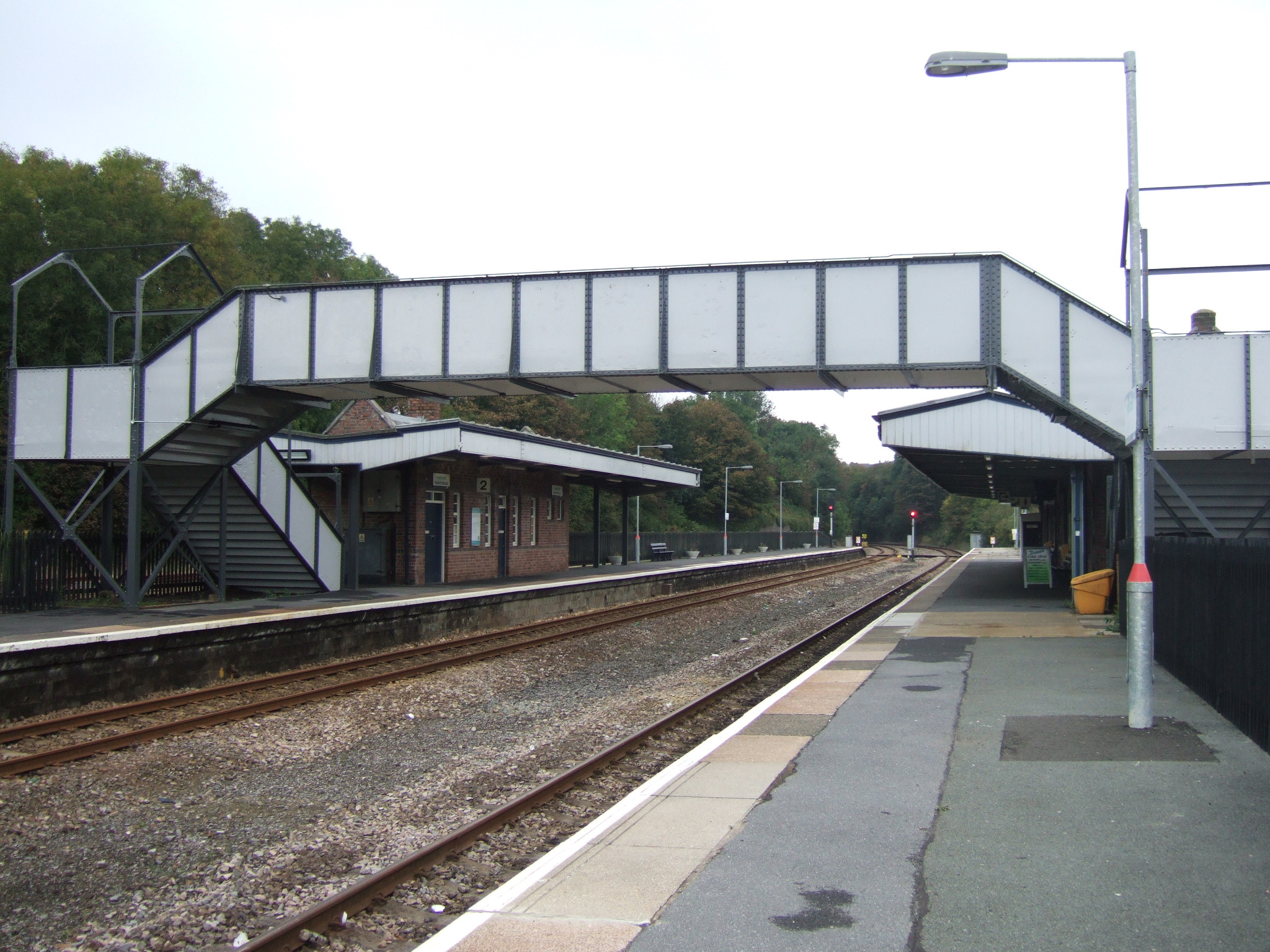
Haverfordwest - Gateway to St Davids

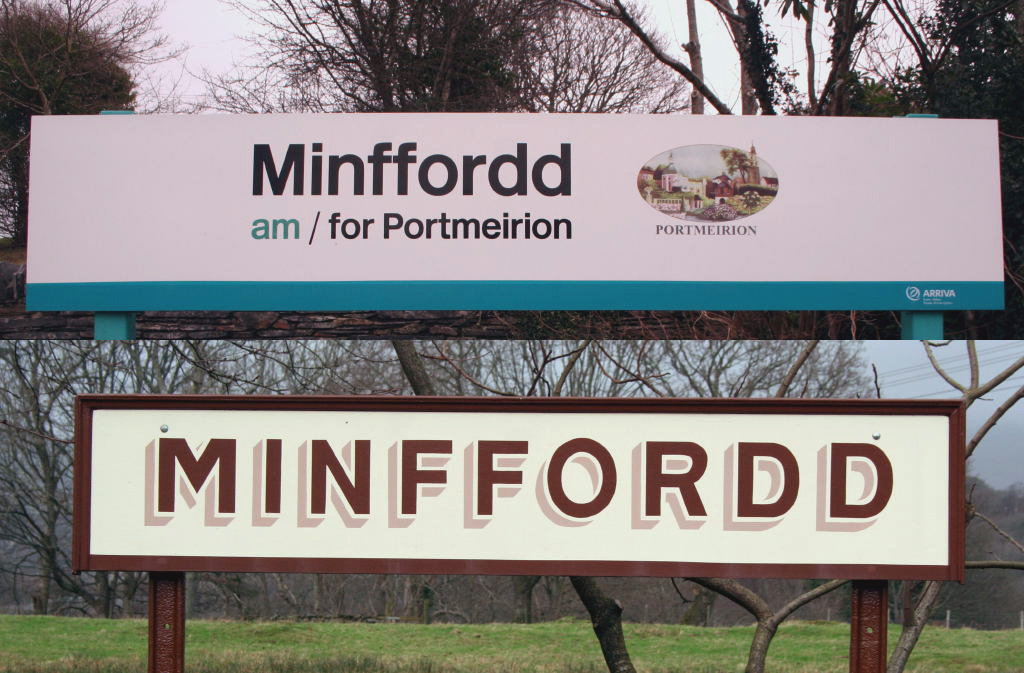
Minffordd - Serving Portmeirion

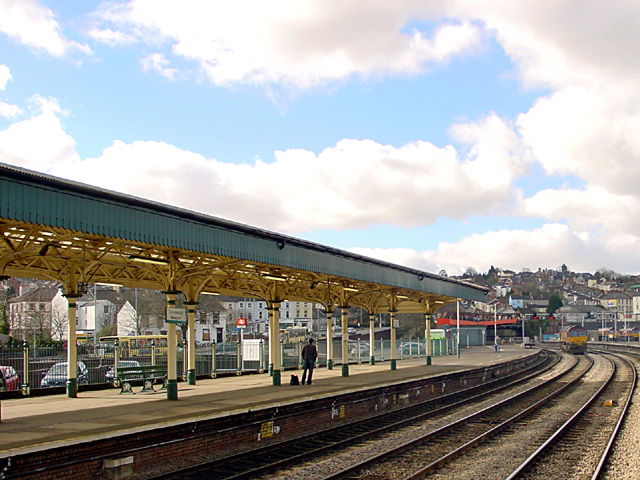
Newport - Third largest and busiest in Wales

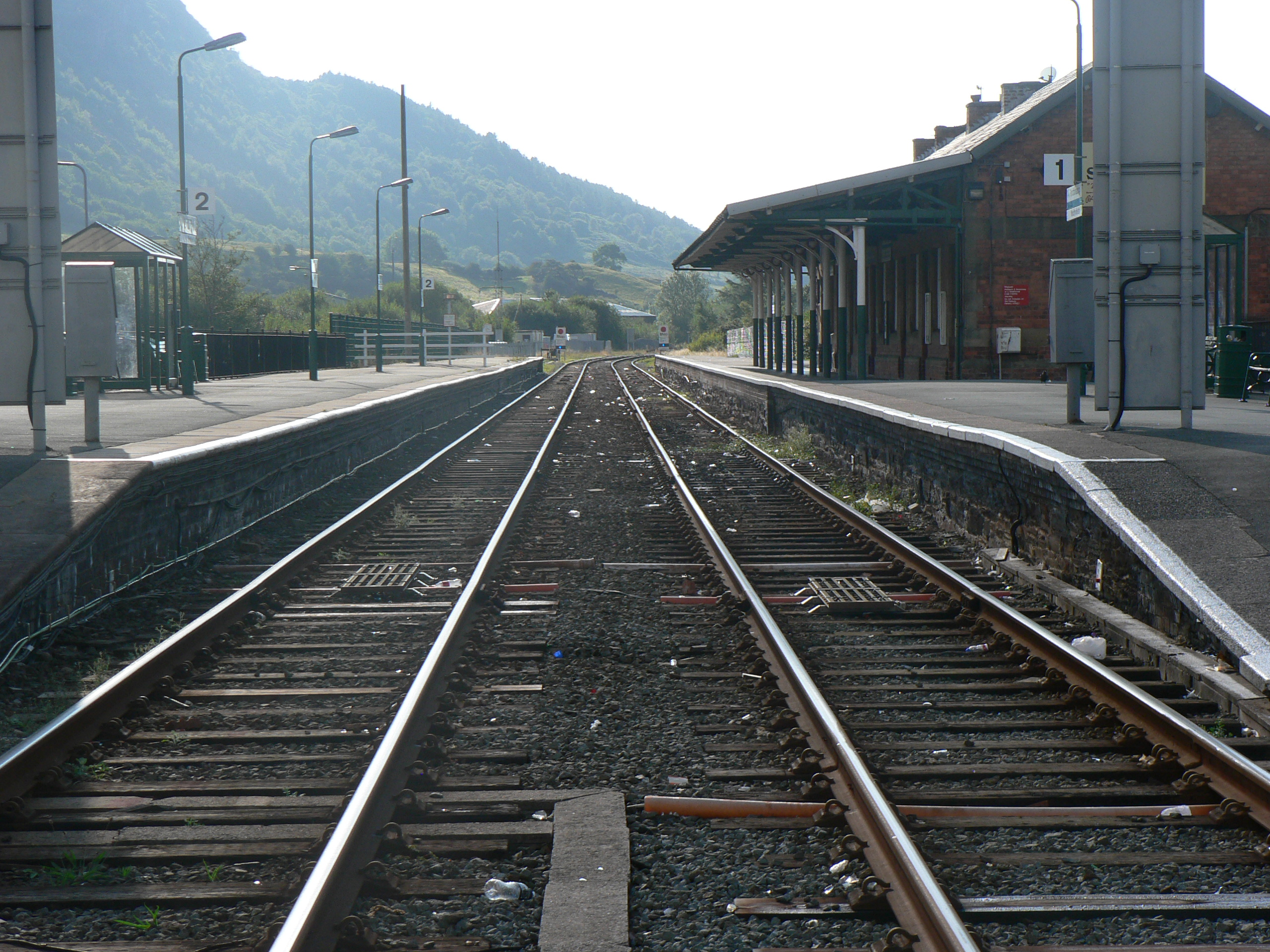
Porthmadog - On the Cambrian Coast Line

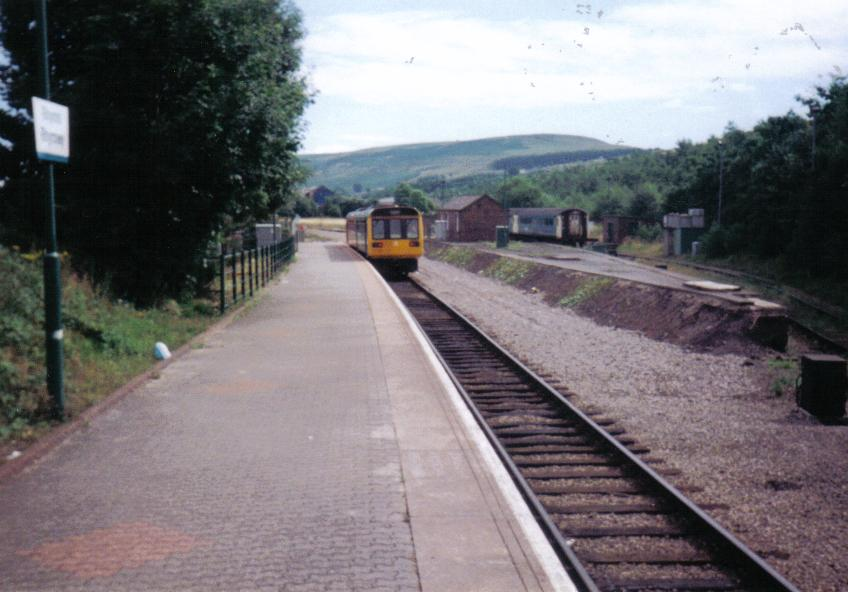
Rhymney - In the heart of the South Wales Valleys

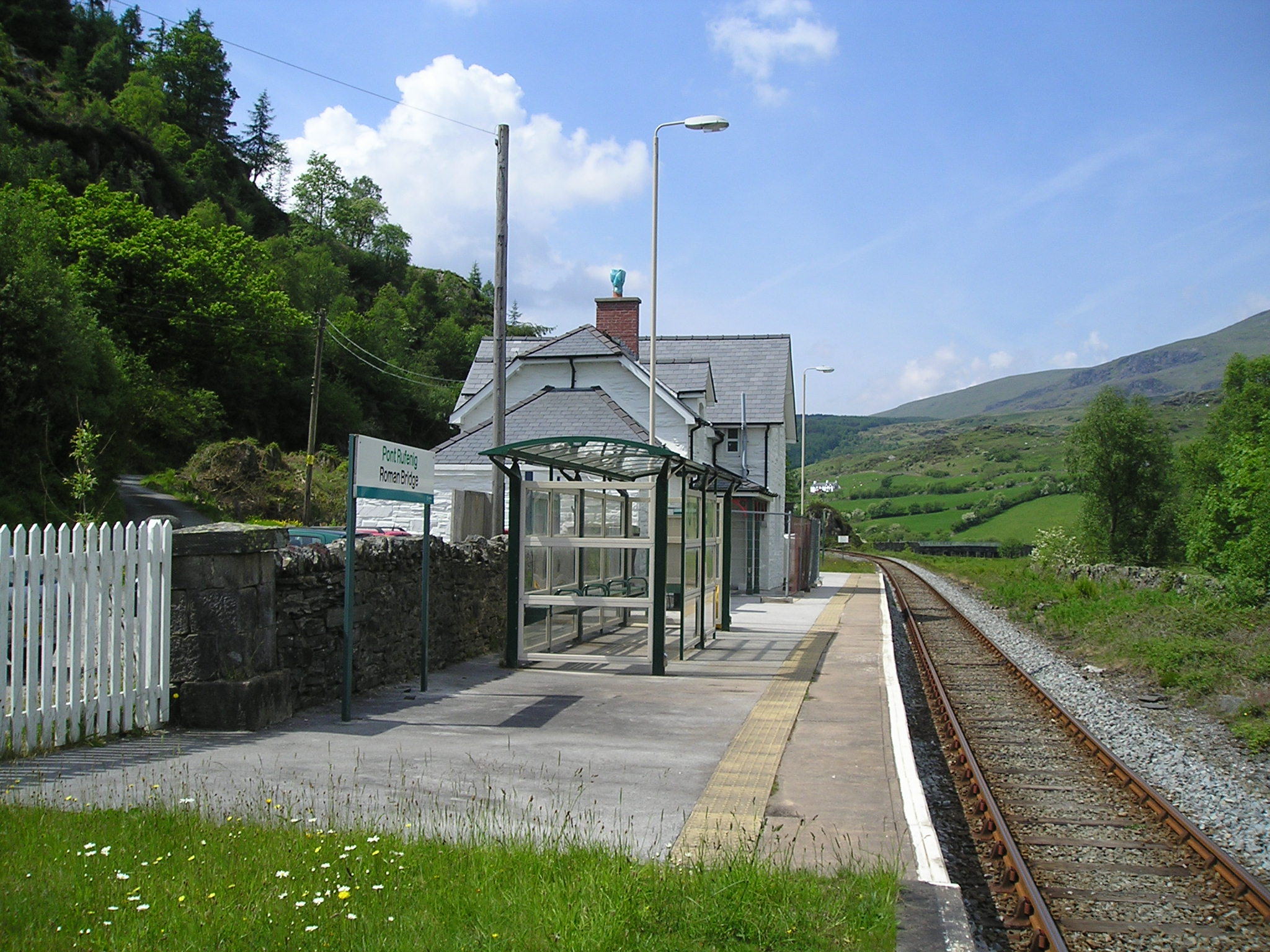
Roman Bridge

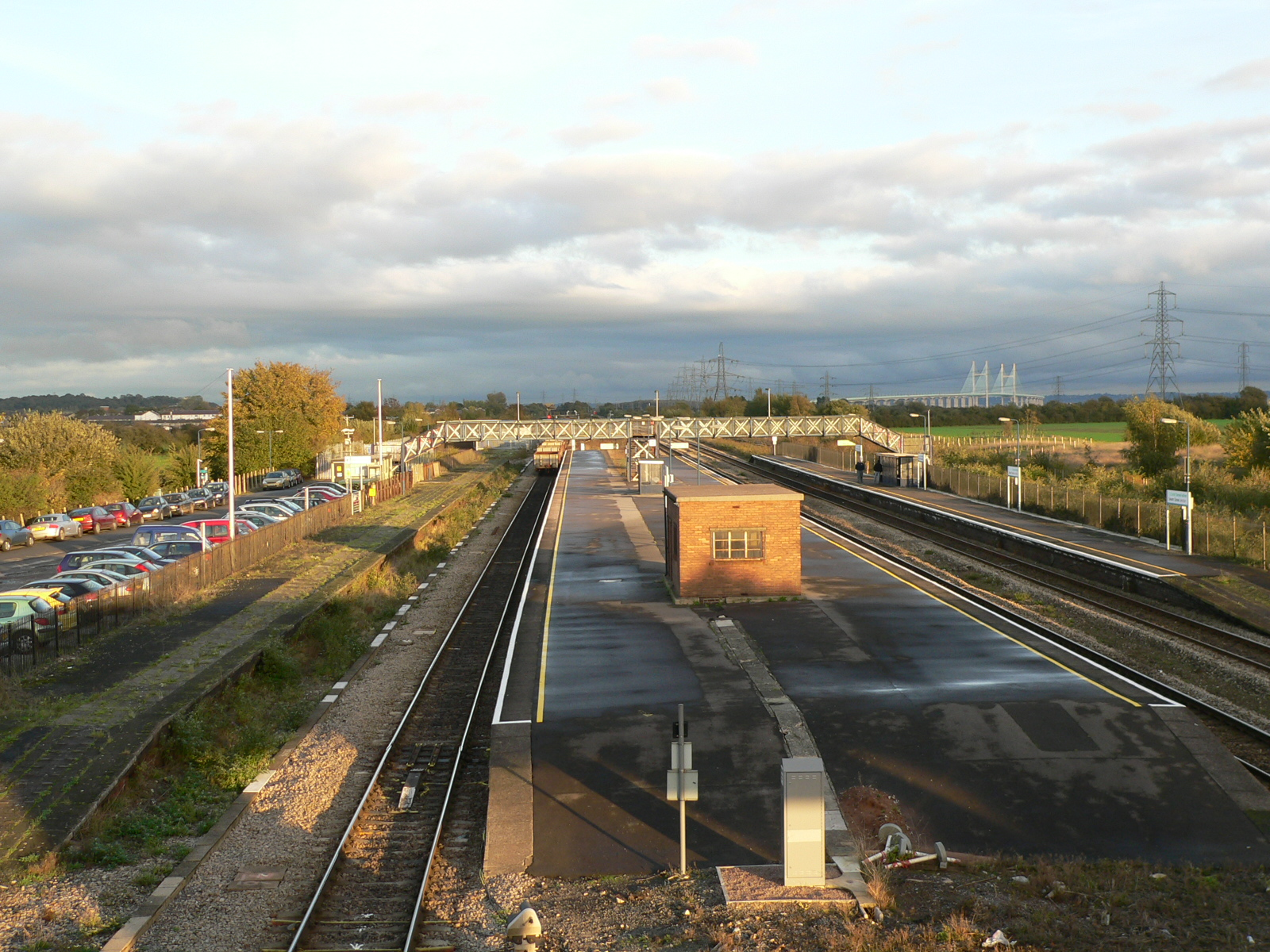
Severn Tunnel Junction - Important commuter station

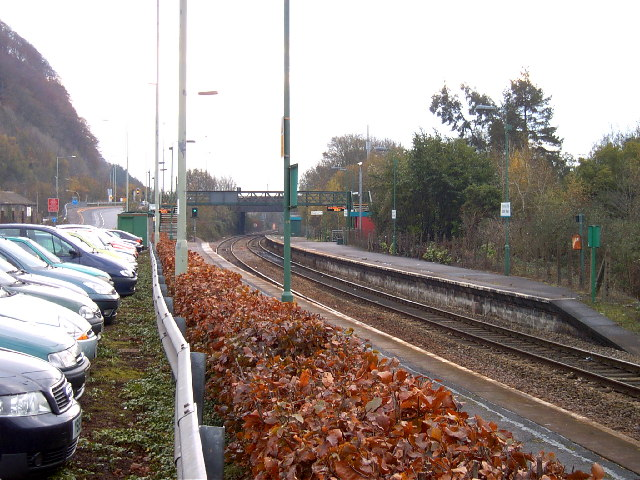
Taff's Well - Serving the Cardiff suburb

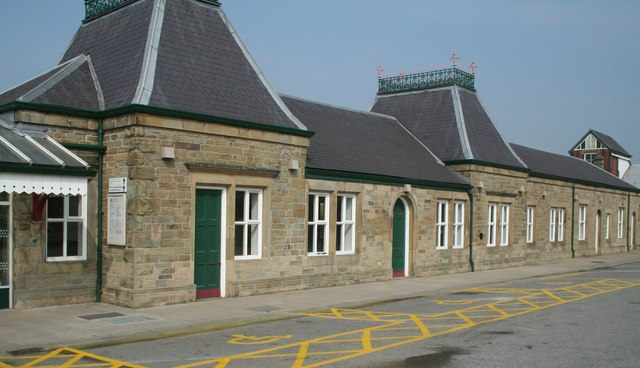
Wrexham General - Important northern interchange for the city

== See also ==
- List of railway stations in Cardiff
- List of Valley Lines stations
- Transport in Wales

== Footnotes ==
^{a} Aber opened in 1908 as Beddau Halt. It was renamed in 1926 as Aber Junction Halt, then in 1968 renamed as Aber Halt. It gained its current name in 1969, after a station in Gwynedd named Aber had been closed in 1960.
^{b} Abercynon opened in 1840 as Navigation House. It was renamed in 1846 as Aberdare Junction, then in 1896 was renamed as Abercynon. It was renamed Abercynon South in 1988, upon the opening of Abercynon North. It reverted to Abercynon in 2008 upon the closure of Abercynon North.
^{c} Abererch was renamed in 1956 as Abererch Halt. The name was changed back in 1968. The station closed in 1994, although it has since reopened.
^{d} Abergavenny was renamed in 1950 as Abergavenny Monmouth Road. The name was changed back in 1968.
^{e} Aberystwyth is also served by the Vale of Rheidol Railway, a narrow-gauge heritage railway.
^{f} Ammanford opened in 1841 as Duffryn. It was renamed in 1889 as Tirydail, and gained its current name in 1960.
^{g} Barry Island is also served by the Barry Island Railway, a standard-gauge heritage railway, also known as the Vale of Glamorgan Railway.
^{h} The present station at Blaenau Ffestiniog was opened in 1982, on the site of the 1882 Great Western Railway station from where trains ran to Bala. This line closed in 1961. The London & North Western Railway line from Llandudno originally terminated to the North of the present location, having reached the town in 1879. The present station is also served by the Ffestiniog Railway, a narrow-gauge heritage railway.
^{i} Coryton was relocated in 1931.
^{j} Fairbourne is also served by the nearby Fairbourne Railway, a narrow-gauge heritage railway.
^{k} Fishguard Harbour is unusual in that it is not owned by Network Rail, but is privately owned by the ferry operator Stena Line, who operate between Fishguard and Rosslare Europort.
^{l} The first station at Holyhead was opened by the Chester and Holyhead Railway in 1848 but this was replaced by the second in 1851. The present station was opened by the London & North Western Railway in 1880.
^{m} Llandudno Junction was opened in 1858 on a site slightly to the West of its present location. The station moved to the present site in 1897 in order to allow room for expansion.
^{n} Although Llanfairpwll is famous for having the longest station name in Britain, Llanfairpwllgwyngyllgogerychwyrndrobwllllantysiliogogogoch, this is only used unofficially. The longest officially used station name on Britain's railway network is in fact Rhoose Cardiff International Airport, in South Wales.
^{o} In 1853 a station called Merthyr High Street was first opened on the present day site of Merthyr Tydfil. It was rebuilt on part of the original site in 1974 and again in 1996.
^{p} Minffordd is also served by the Ffestiniog Railway, a narrow-gauge heritage railway.
^{q} Porthmadog is also served by the Ffestiniog Railway, and the Welsh Highland Railway, both narrow-gauge heritage railways.
^{r} Tywyn is also served by the Talyllyn Railway, a narrow-gauge heritage railway.
^{s} Although the English spelling for the area served is Llandaff, the station uses the Welsh spelling Llandaf
