= List of Valley Lines stations =

This is a list of stations on the Valley Lines urban rail system, serving Cardiff, the capital of Wales, and surrounding commuter towns listed by local authority area.

== Cardiff ==
- Cardiff Queen Street (Caerdydd Heol Y Frenhines)
- Cardiff Central (Caerdydd Canolog)
- Cardiff Bay (Bae Caerdydd)
- Ninian Park (Parc Ninian)
- Waun-Gron Park (Parc Waun-Gron)
- Fairwater (Tyllgoed)
- Danescourt
- Radyr
- Heath Low Level (Lefel Isel y Mynydd Bychan)
- Tŷ Glas
- Birchgrove (Llwynbedw)
- Rhiwbina
- Whitchurch (Yr Eglwys Newydd)
- Coryton
- Cathays
- Llandaff (Llandaf)
- Taffs Well (Ffynon Taf)
- Heath High Level (Lefel Uchal y Mynydd Bychan)
- Llanishen
- Lisvane & Thornhill (Llys-faen)
- Grangetown

== Rhondda Cynon Taff ==
- Treforest Estate (Ystad Trefforest)
- Treforest (Trefforest)
- Pontypridd
- Penrhiwceiber
- Mountain Ash (Aberpennar)
- Fernhill
- Cwmbach
- Aberdare (Aberdâr)
- Abercynon (Abercynon)
- Trehafod
- Porth
- Dinas Rhondda
- Tonypandy
- Llwynypia
- Ystrad Rhondda
- Ton Pentre
- Treorchy
- Ynyswen
- Treherbert
- Pontyclun
- Llanharan

== Merthyr Tydfil ==
- Quakers Yard (Mynwent-y-Crynwyr)
- Merthyr Vale (Ynysowen)
- Troed-y-rhiw<
- Pentre-bach
- Merthyr Tydfil (Merthyr Tudfil)

== Caerphilly ==
- Caerphilly (Caerffili)
- Aber
- Llanbradach
- Ystrad Mynach
- Hengoed
- Pengam
- Gilfach Fargoed
- Bargoed
- Brithdir
- Tir-Phil
- Pontlottyn (Pontlotyn)
- Rhymney (Rhymni)

== Vale Of Glamorgan ==
- Dingle Road (Heol Dingle)
- Penarth
- Cogan
- Eastbrook
- Dinas Powys
- Cadoxton (Tregatwg)
- Barry Docks (Dociau'r Barri)
- Barry (Y Barri)
- Barry Island (Ynys Y Barri)
- Rhoose Cardiff International Airport (Y Rhws Maes Awyr Rhyngwladol Caerdydd)
- Llantwit Major (Llanilltud Fawr)

== Bridgend ==
- Pencoed
- Bridgend (Pen-Y-Bont)
- Wildmill (Melin Wyllt)
- Sarn
- Tondu
- Garth
- Maesteg (Ewenny Road) (Maesteg Heol Ewenni)
- Maesteg
