= Valleys & Cardiff Local Routes =

Cardiff's suburban rail network

Valleys & Cardiff Local Routes (formerly Valley Lines) is the urban and suburban rail network radiating from Cardiff, Wales. It includes lines within the city itself, the Vale of Glamorgan and the South Wales Valleys.

The services are currently operated by Transport for Wales Rail as the South Wales Metro. In total, it serves 81 stations in six unitary authority areas: 20 in the city of Cardiff, 11 in the Vale of Glamorgan, 25 in Rhondda Cynon Taf, 16 in Caerphilly, 8 in Bridgend and 5 in Merthyr Tydfil.

Services on these routes are currently provided by a transitional fleet of Class 150 DMUs and Class 398 tram-train multiple units alongside fully-introduced Class 231 Diesel–electric multiple units and Class 756 tri-mode multiple units. They are typically end-to-end, in that they run from one branch terminus, through Cardiff Queen Street station, to another branch terminus, e.g. from Pontypridd to Barry Island.

The major hubs of the network are Cardiff Queen Street and Cardiff Central. Other hubs are Pontypridd, Bridgend and Barry.

== History ==
A stretch of the Vale of Glamorgan Line, on which passenger services were closed under the Beeching Axe, re-opened for passenger service, with services from Cardiff Central to Bridgend, via Barry, Rhoose Cardiff Intl. Airport and Llantwit Major. These services were originally advertised to start in April 2005, but commenced on 12 June 2005. Previously services only went as far as Barry.

On 28 March 2020, ownership of the lines between Cardiff and Treherbert, Aberdare, Merthyr Tydfil, Coryton, Rhymney and Cwmbargoed (the "Core Valley Lines") was transferred from Network Rail to Transport for Wales, who leased them to operator AKIL.

== Electrification ==
On 16 July 2012 the UK Government announced plans to extend the electrification of the network at a cost of £350 million. This was at the same time of the announcement of electrification of the South Wales Main Line from Cardiff to Swansea. The fleet operating the South Wales Metro will consist of Stadler Rail's FLIRT and Citylink families. Class 231 bi-mode trainsets and Class 756 tri-mode trainsets will operate on conventional railways, while Class 398 battery-electric tram-trains will operate on both on-street tracks and conventional railways . There is also continued improvements to stations such as improved accessibility.

The investment will require new trains and should result in reduced journey times and cheaper maintenance of the network. Work was expected to start between 2014 and 2019, but has since been pushed back to between 2019 and 2024.

== Lines ==
The Valley Lines network and surrounding routes

The colours used below are from the official network map (see External links). Stations in bold are major interchanges for the network.

Cardiff Bay Line	City Line	Coryton Line	Vale of Glamorgan Line
**Cardiff Queen St.** Cardiff Bay	**Cardiff Queen St.** **Cardiff Central**; Ninian Park; Waun-Gron Park; Fairwater; Danescourt; Radyr	**Cardiff Central**; **Cardiff Queen St.** Heath Low Level; Ty Glas; Birchgrove; Rhiwbina; Whitchurch; Coryton	**Cardiff Central**; Grangetown; Dingle Road; Penarth; Cogan; Eastbrook; Dinas Powys; Cadoxton; Barry Docks; Barry; Barry Island; Rhoose Cardiff Int. Airport; Llantwit Major; Bridgend

Merthyr Line	Merthyr Line	Rhondda Line	Rhymney Line
**Cardiff Central**; **Cardiff Queen St.** Cathays; Llandaf; Radyr; Taffs Well; Treforest Estate; Treforest; Pontypridd; Abercynon; Quakers Yard; Merthyr Vale; Troed-y-rhiw; Pentre-bach; Merthyr Tydfil	**Cardiff Central**; **Cardiff Queen St.** Cathays; Llandaf; Radyr; Taffs Well; Treforest Estate; Treforest; Pontypridd; Abercynon; Penrhiwceiber; Mountain Ash; Fernhill; Cwmbach; Aberdare	**Cardiff Central**; **Cardiff Queen St.** Cathays; Llandaf; Radyr; Taffs Well; Treforest Estate; Treforest; Pontypridd; Trehafod; Porth; Dinas Rhondda; Tonypandy; Llwynypia; Ystrad Rhondda; Ton Pentre; Treorchy; Ynyswen; Treherbert	**Cardiff Central**; **Cardiff Queen St.** Heath High Level; Llanishen; Lisvane & Thornhill; Caerphilly; Aber; Energlyn and Churchill Park; Llanbradach; Ystrad Mynach; Hengoed; Pengam; Gilfach Fargoed; Bargoed; Brithdir; Tir-Phil; Pontlottyn; Rhymney

=== Routes ===
Generally trains run from one line to another, joining at Cardiff Central eliminating the need for changing trains there. However they may not run for the whole length of the line.

Before the June 2024 train timetable changes, Services had run between:

- Bridgend/Barry Island and Merthyr Tydfil/Aberdare – incorporating the Vale of Glamorgan and Merthyr/Aberdare Lines
- Penarth and Rhymney/Bargoed – incorporating the Vale of Glamorgan and Rhymney Lines
- Radyr and Coryton – incorporating the City and Coryton Lines
- Cardiff Central and Treherbert – incorporating the Rhondda Line only
- Cardiff Queen Street and Cardiff Bay – incorporating the Butetown Branch Line only

After the June 2024 train timetable changes, Services now run between:

- Bridgend/Barry Island and Rhymney/Bargoed – incorporating the Vale of Glamorgan and Rhymney Lines
- Penarth and Coryton/Caerphilly – incorporating the Vale of Glamorgan and Rhymney/Coryton Lines
- Cardiff Central and Merthyr Tydfil/Aberdare – incorporating the City and Merthyr/Aberdare Lines (trains from Aberdare to Cardiff now travel after Radyr via the City Line, and after Cardiff Central then go on to Cardiff Queen St and proceed to Merthyr Tydfil; trains from Merthyr Tydfil continue on to Aberdare after Cardiff Central)
- Cardiff Central and Treherbert – incorporating the Rhondda Line only
- Cardiff Queen Street/Pontypridd and Cardiff Bay – incorporating the Butetown Branch Line only

== Surrounding lines ==
The following lines also serve Cardiff and the South Wales Valleys but are not considered part of the network by Transport for Wales and use more "mainline" rolling stock (currently Class 197 units).

█ Maesteg – Cheltenham	█ Ebbw Valley Railway
Cheltenham Spa; Gloucester; Lydney; Chepstow; Caldicot; Severn Tunnel Junction; Newport; Cardiff Central; Pontyclun; Llanharan; Pencoed; Bridgend; Wildmill; Sarn; Tondu; Garth; Maesteg (Ewenny Road); Maesteg	Cardiff Central (and/or Newport); Pye Corner; Rogerstone; Risca and Pontymister; Crosskeys; Newbridge; Llanhilleth; Ebbw Vale Parkway; Ebbw Vale Town

== See also ==
- South Wales Metro
- Rail transport in Cardiff
- List of Valley Lines stations
- List of railway stations in Wales
