= Ynyswen =

Welsh town

Coordinates: 51.665583°N 3.516179°W

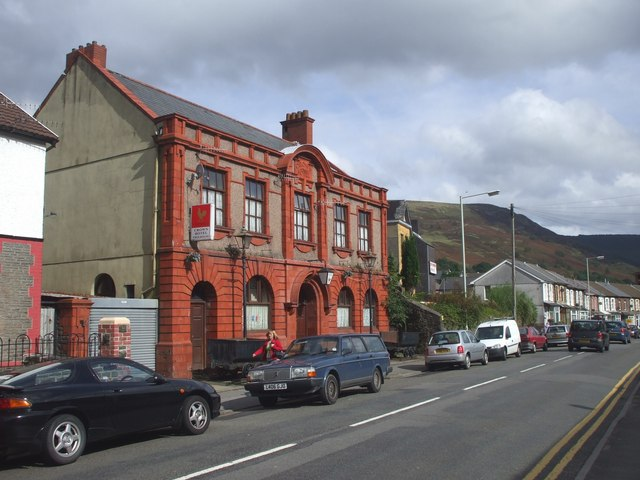
The Crown Hotel, 2008

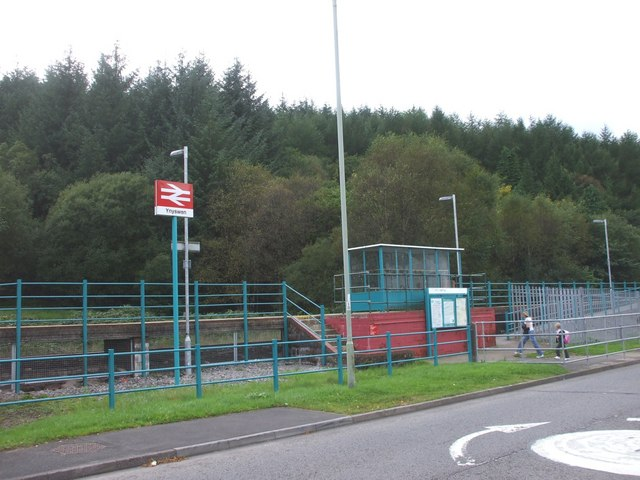
Railway station, 2008

Ynyswen (Welsh pronunciation; meaning White island) is a village in the community of Treorchy, in the county borough of Rhondda Cynon Taf, Wales.

Ynyswen consists mostly of housing. It has an industrial estate which was once the site of Burberry's factory, one shop, and the Forest View Medical Centre.

The area has several chapels and churches. Ynyswen school once stood where Ynyswen Welfare Hall now stands on Ynyswen rd. It was rebuilt in 1912 in a new location along the Rhondda River and closed in 2014 with the children to attend the newly built Penyrenglyn Primary School. Ysgol Gynradd Gymraeg Ynyswen is a Welsh primary school, established in 1950, that serves the upper Rhondda Valley. After leaving pupils attend Ysgol Gyfun Gymraeg Cwm Rhondda in Cymer, 5 miles down the valley.

Ynyswen railway station is on the Rhondda Line opened by British Rail.

On 5 March 2021 an incident, centred on a take-away restaurant in the village, led to the death of a 16-year-old girl and the arrest of two men, who had themselves suffered serious injuries.
