= Maesteg (Ewenny Road) railway station =

Railway station in Bridgend, Wales

Maesteg (Ewenny Road) Welsh: Maesteg (Heol Ewenni)
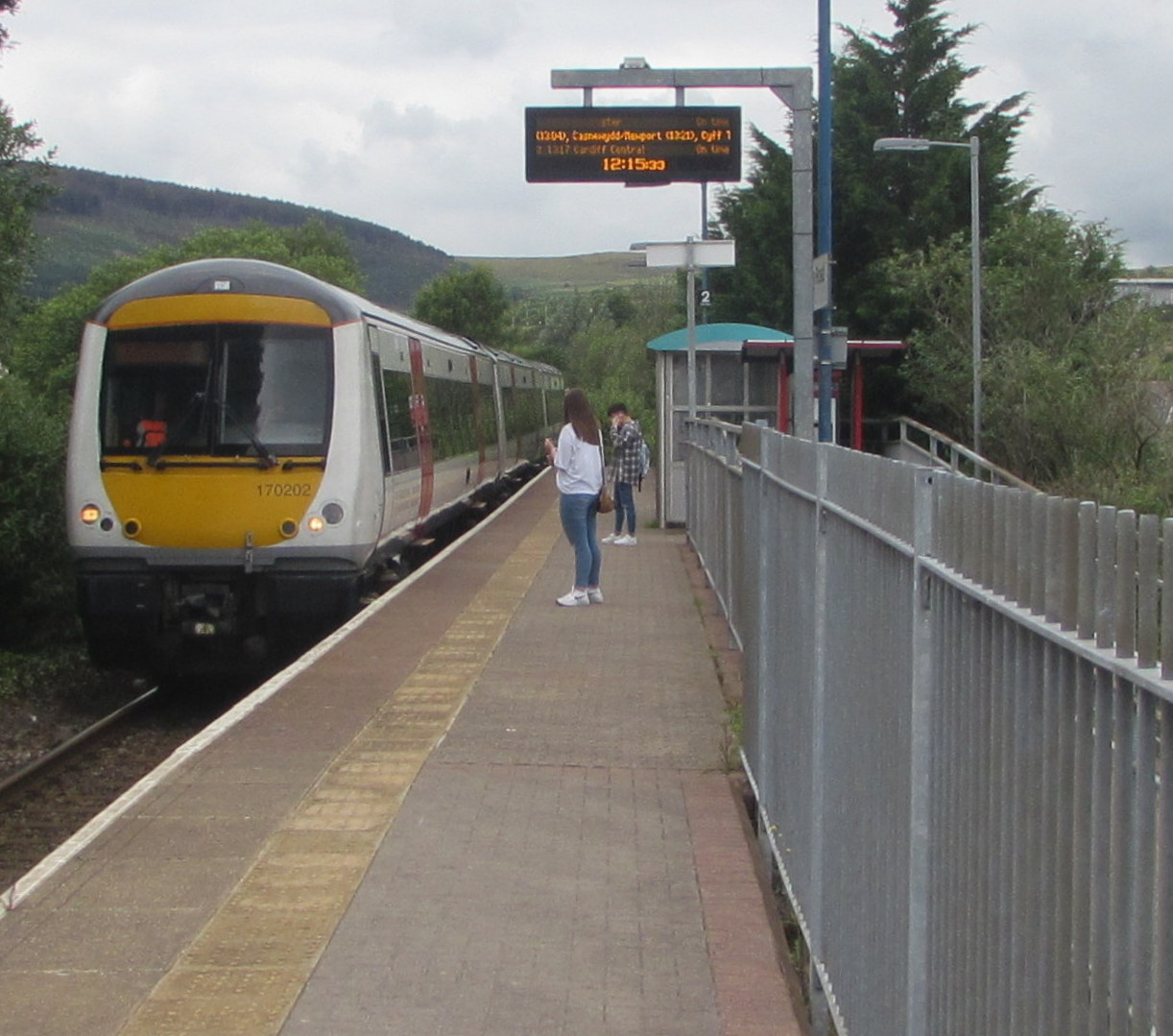

General information
- Location: Maesteg, Bridgend; Wales
- Coordinates: 51.6053°N 3.6483°W
- Grid reference: SS859908
- Manager: Transport for Wales Rail
- Platforms: 1

Other information
- Station code: MEW
- Classification: DfT category F2

History
- Original company: British Rail

Key dates
- 26 October 1992: Station opened
- 2008: Platform lengthened to accommodate 4-car trains

Passengers
- 2021/22: ▲13,134
- 2022/23: ▲15,108
- 2023/24: ▲16,324
- 2024/25: ▲17,476
- 2025/26: ▲21,840
Location
Notes
- Passenger statistics from the Office of Rail and Road

Maesteg (Ewenny Road) railway station is one of two railway stations that serve the town of Maesteg in Wales. It is located adjacent to the Ewenny Road Industrial Estate to the south of Maesteg on the Maesteg Line from Cardiff via Bridgend. The other station, which is the terminus of the Maesteg Line, is named Maesteg.

== History ==
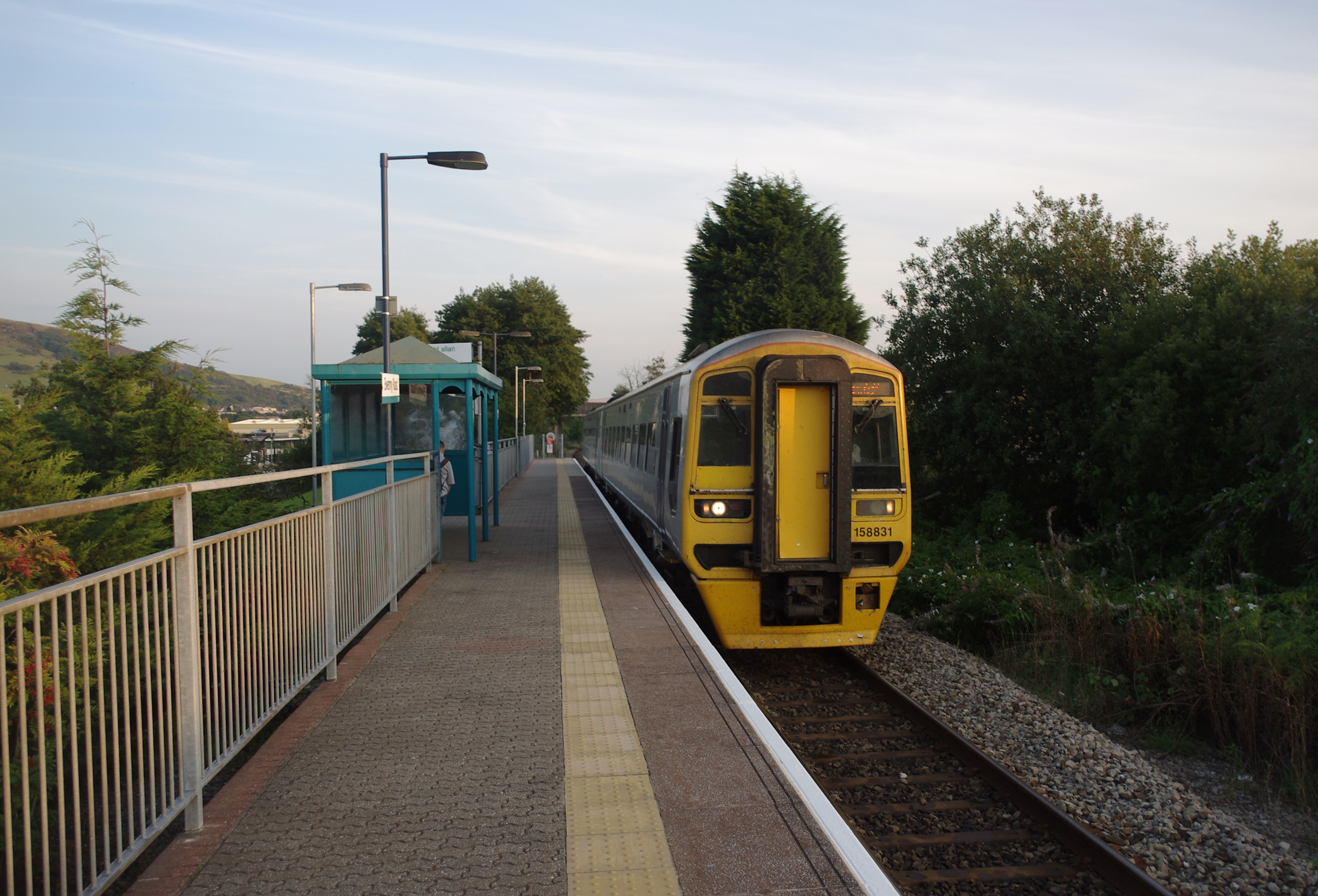
158831 operating an Arriva Trains Wales service from Cheltenham Spa to Maesteg

Passenger services were restored to the Maesteg Line in 1992 by British Rail and Mid Glamorgan County Council. The station opened on 26 October 1992, slightly later than planned along with Wildmill. Both stations were brand new additions and did not replace a station previously in existence prior to the 1970 passenger service withdrawal. The platform was lengthened in 2008 to allow four-car trains to operate busier services. This was funded by the Welsh Government and the European Union.

== Service ==
Services are operated by Transport for Wales Rail Services as part of the Valley Lines network for local services.

Preceding station	National Rail	Following station
Garth	Transport for Wales; Maesteg Line	Maesteg
