= Treforest railway station =

Railway station in Rhondda Cynon Taf, Wales

Treforest Welsh: Trefforest
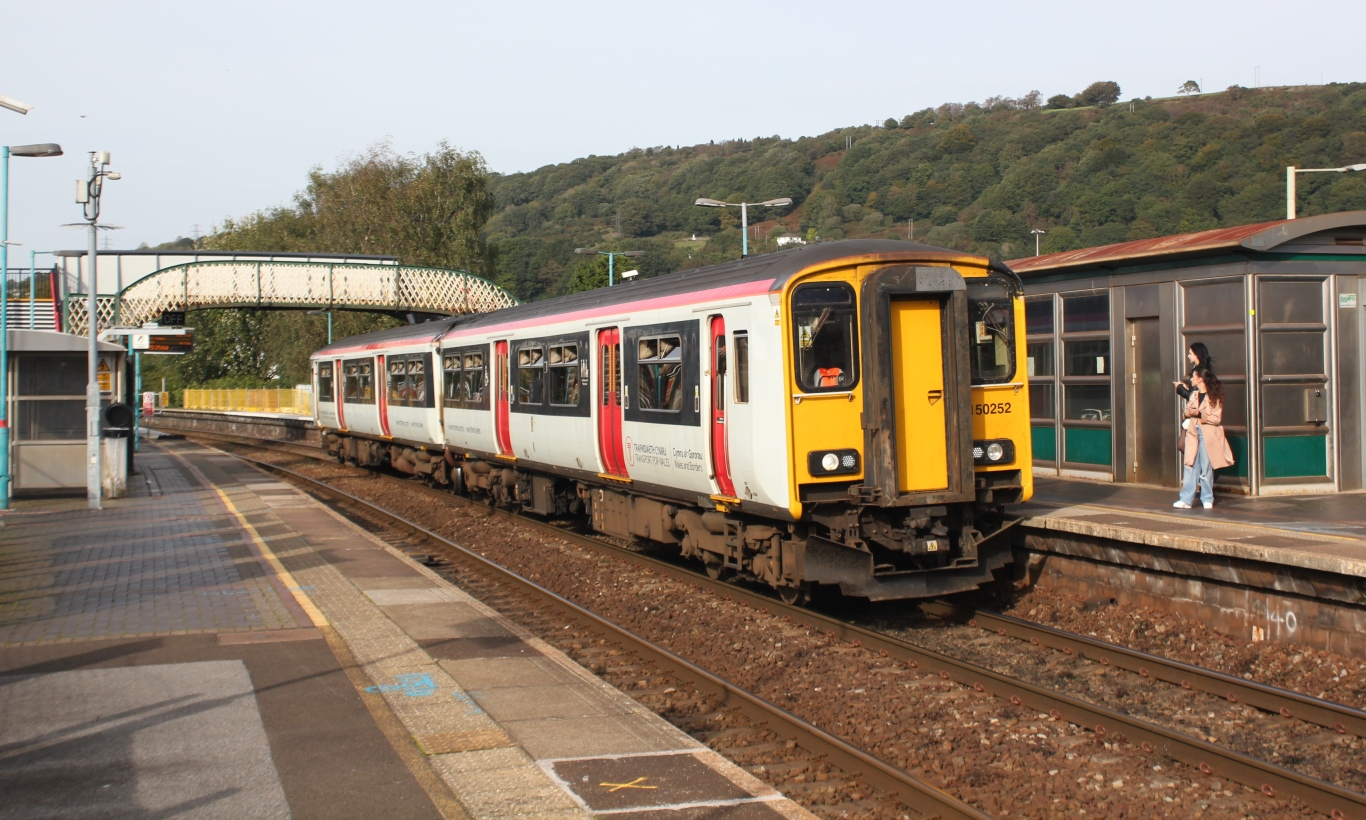

General information
- Location: Treforest, Rhondda Cynon Taf; Wales
- Coordinates: 51.5920°N 3.3250°W
- Grid reference: ST083889
- Managed by: Transport for Wales
- Platforms: 2

Other information
- Station code: TRF
- Classification: DfT category E

History
- Original company: Taff Vale Railway
- Pre-grouping: Taff Vale Railway
- Post-grouping: Great Western Railway

Key dates
- 1847: Station opened as Treforest
- 1 July 1924: Renamed Treforest Low Level
- 5 May 1930: Renamed Treforest
- 12 May 1980: Renamed Trefforest

Passengers
- 2020/21: ▼79,490
- 2021/22: ▲0.398 million
- 2022/23: ▲0.554 million
- 2023/24: ▲0.650 million
- 2024/25: ▲0.712 million
Location
Notes
- Passenger statistics from the Office of Rail and Road

Treforest railway station is a railway station serving the village of Treforest, Rhondda Cynon Taf, Wales. It is located on the Merthyr Line and the Rhondda Line 18 km (11½ miles) north west of Cardiff Central. Passenger services are provided by Transport for Wales.

The station is a short walk from the Treforest campus of the University of South Wales, and many of the passengers using the station are staff or students of the university.

A station at this location was first opened by the Taff Vale Railway in 1845.

== History ==
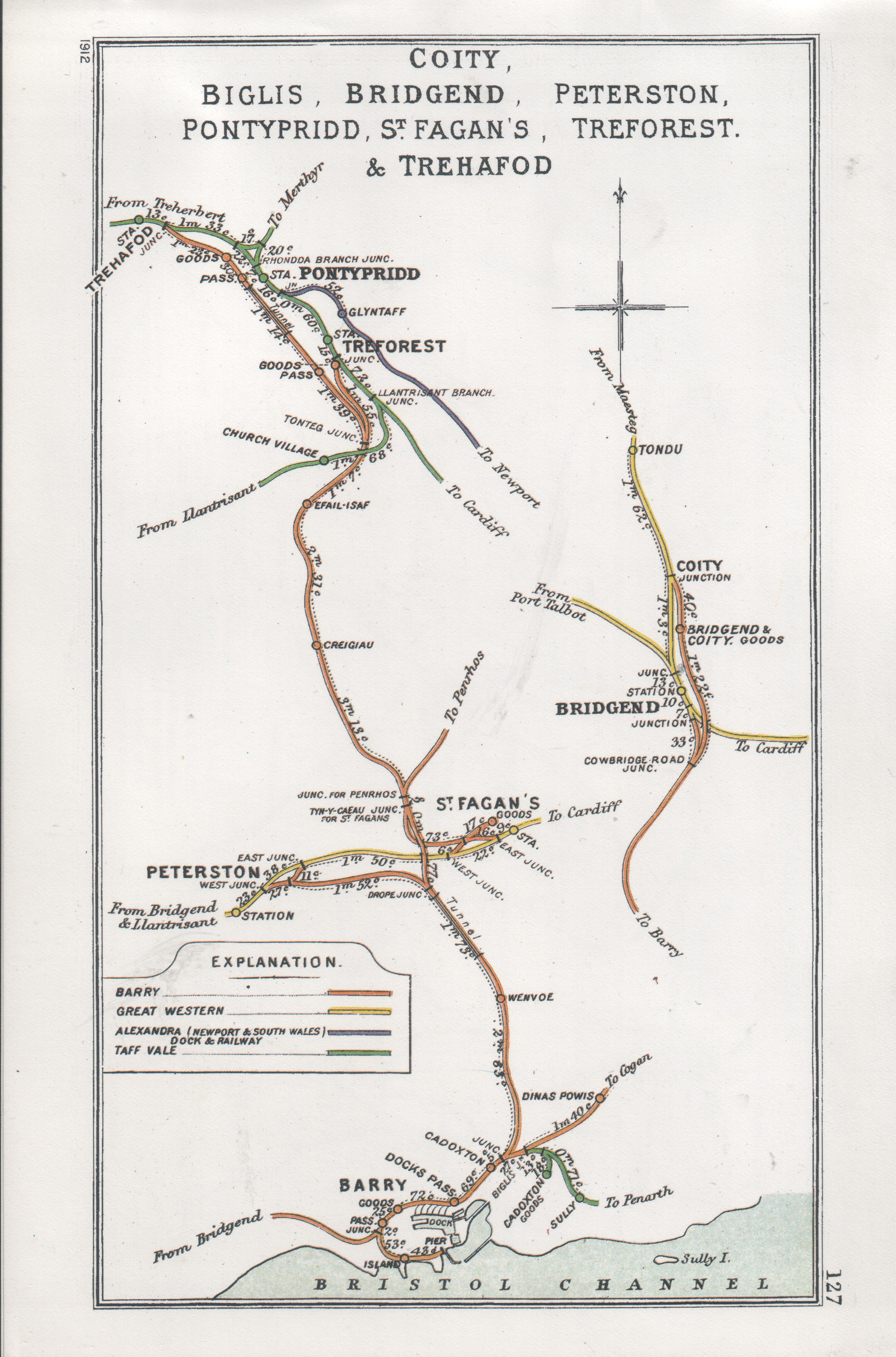
A 1912 Railway Clearing House Junction Diagram showing (left) railways in the vicinity of Treforest (upper left)

The first section of the Taff Vale Railway (TVR), between Cardiff Docks and Navigation House (now Abercynon) was opened on 8 October 1840. The station at Treforest was not opened until 1847. As well as being served by trains between Merthyr & Cardiff on the main TVR route, it also acted as the junction station for the Llantrisant and Taff Vale Junction Railway branch line from its opening to passenger traffic in 1875.

The TVR was amalgamated with the Great Western Railway on 1 January 1922, along with the Barry Railway and several others. Both the Barry Railway and the TVR had stations named Treforest, so to avoid confusion, the ex-TVR station was renamed Treforest Low Level on 1 July 1924.

The former Barry Railway passenger service between Porth and Barry was diverted via Treforest Low Level from 10 July 1930, and on that date the station resumed its previous identity of Treforest. Services to both Cardiff and Barry on this route ended on 10 September 1962, whilst that to Llantrisant had been withdrawn a decade earlier (on 31 March 1952). Both lines had closed completely by 1964.

The Welsh spelling of Trefforest was adopted on 12 May 1980.

== Services ==
During Monday–Saturday daytimes, there are usually six trains an hour from Cardiff Central, two to each of Treherbert, Merthyr Tydfil and Aberdare, all stopping at Pontypridd. There are six trains an hour to Cardiff Central with some trains continuing beyond Cardiff to Barry Island, or to Bridgend via Llantwit Major.

A reduced service operates on Sundays (2-hourly to all three northbound destinations, 3 trains every two hours to Cardiff and beyond).

Preceding station	National Rail	Following station
Treforest Estate	Transport for Wales; Merthyr Line	Pontypridd
Taffs Well	Transport for Wales; Rhondda Line	Pontypridd
	Disused railways	
Tonteg Halt; Line and station closed	Llantrisant and Taff Vale Junction Railway; Pontypridd-Llantrisant	Pontypridd; Line and station open
Tonteg Halt; Line and station closed	Great Western Railway; Porth-Barry	Pontypridd; Line and station open
