= Treforest Estate railway station =

Railway station in Cardiff, Wales

Treforest Estate Welsh: Ystad Trefforest
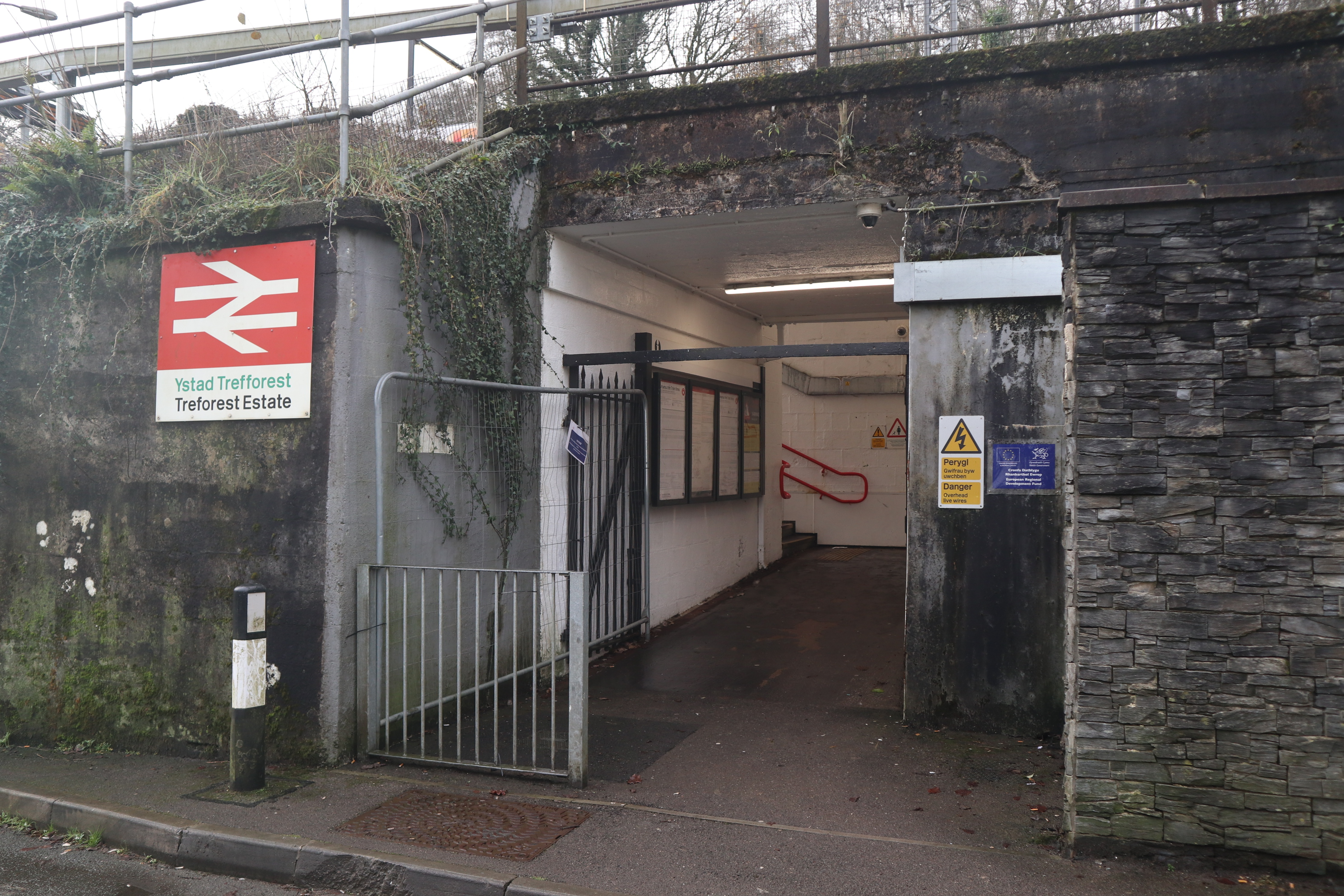
- Treforest Estate entrance seen in December 2024

General information
- Location: Ton-Teg, Rhondda Cynon Taf; Wales
- Coordinates: 51°34′05″N 3°17′24″W
- Grid reference: ST106862
- Manager: Transport for Wales
- Platforms: 2

Other information
- Station code: TRE
- Classification: DfT category F2

History
- Opened: 5 January 1942

Passengers
- 2020/21: ▼7,804
- 2021/22: ▲37,666
- 2022/23: ▲46,480
- 2023/24: ▲53,136
- 2024/25: ▲0.121 million
Location
Notes
- Passenger statistics from the Office of Rail and Road

Treforest Estate railway station (also Trefforest Estate, Welsh: Ystad Trefforest) is a small railway station in Treforest, near Cardiff, built to serve the workers and visitors of Treforest Industrial Estate. It is located on the Merthyr Line, 8.7 miles (14 km) north-west of Cardiff Central.

Passenger services are provided by Transport for Wales. The station is built around a central island platform, which is accessible from a subway.

== History ==
It was opened by the Great Western Railway in 1942.

In the spring of 2016, new shelters were installed on the platform ahead of the South Wales Metro project.

== Future ==
The station is to be relocated by December 2025 as part of the South Wales Metro and has been included in the Wales & Borders franchise. This is to improve safety and convenience.

== Services ==
Mondays to Saturdays, there are eight trains per hour southbound towards Cardiff Queen Street, with two continuing to Cardiff Bay and six continuing to Cardiff Central. Four of those six loop around the City Line back to Radyr and onwards again to Pontypridd. There are eight trains per hour towards Pontypridd with two terminating at Pontypridd, two to Aberdare, two to Merthyr Tydfil and two to Treherbert. Sundays see 4tph to Cardiff Central and 1tph to Aberdare, Merthyr Tydfil and Treherbert with one terminating at Pontypridd.

Preceding station	National Rail	Following station
Taffs Well	Transport for Wales; Merthyr Line	Treforest
