= Brithdir railway station =

Railway station in Caerphilly, Wales

Brithdir
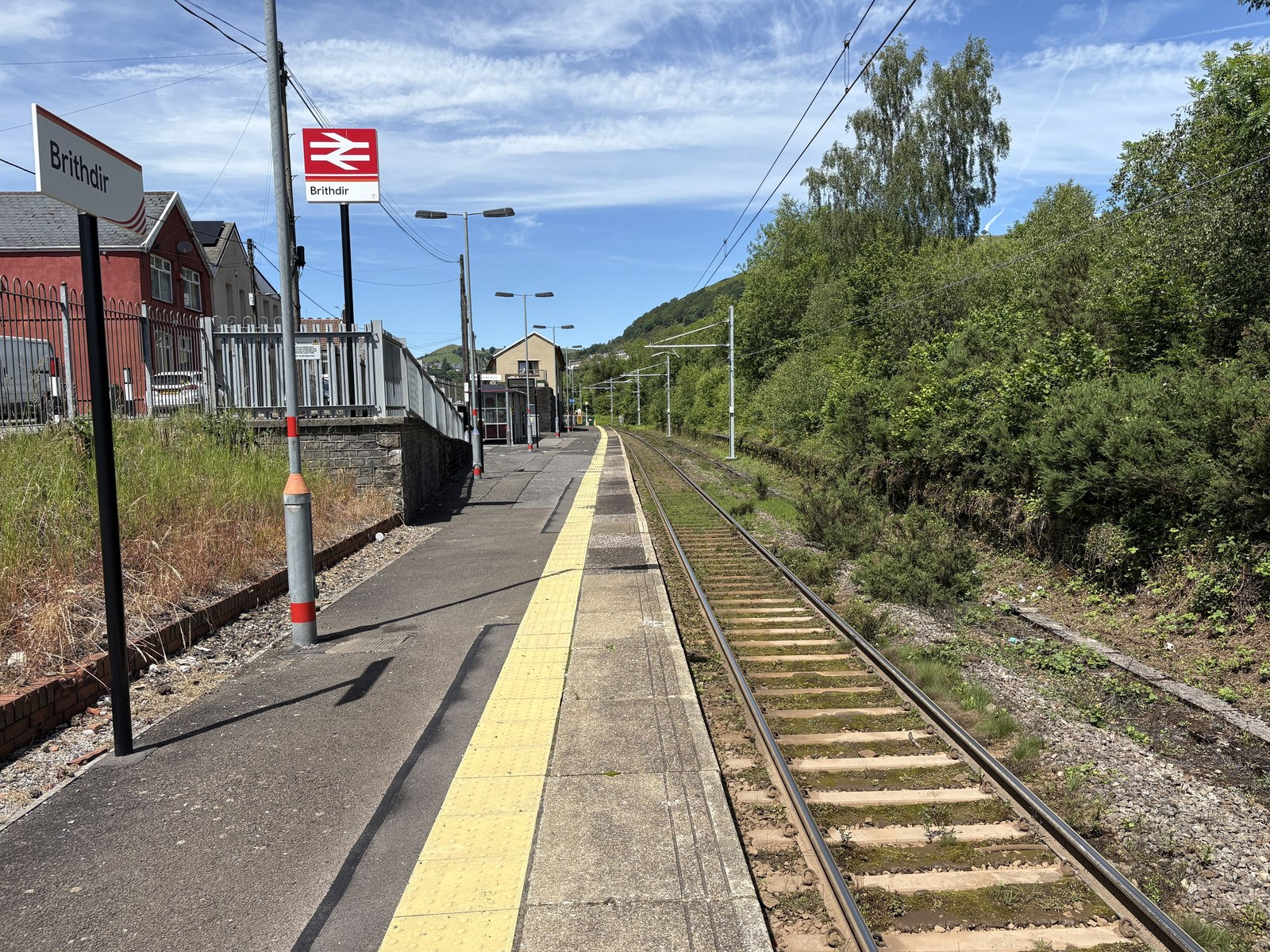

General information
- Location: Brithdir, Caerphilly; Wales
- Coordinates: 51°42′35″N 3°13′41″W
- Grid reference: SO152020
- Manager: Transport for Wales
- Platforms: 1

Other information
- Station code: BHD
- Classification: DfT category F2

History
- Opened: May 1871

Passengers
- 2021/22: ▲9,140
- 2022/23: ▲12,370
- 2023/24: ▼12,262
- 2024/25: ▲13,052
- 2025/26: ▼10,760
Location
Notes
- Passenger statistics from the Office of Rail and Road

Brithdir railway station is a railway station serving the village of Brithdir near New Tredegar, South Wales. It is a stop on the Rhymney Line 18 3/4 miles (30.2 km) north of Cardiff Central which is part of the Transport for Wales network. Work to extend the platform for six-car trains is in progress.

== Facilities ==
New customer information screens were installed in 2012.

== Services ==
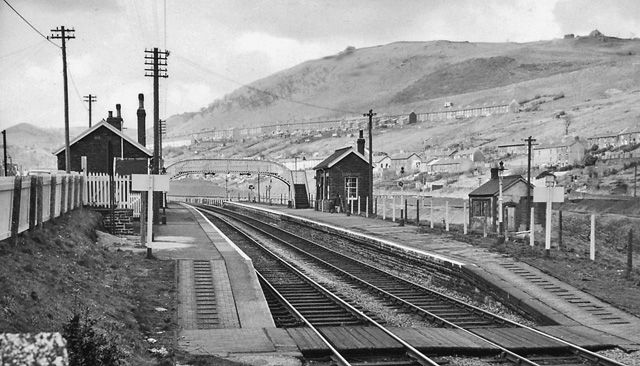
Brithdir station in 1965

Mondays to Sundays there is an hourly service southbound to Cardiff Central and Barry Island and northbound to Rhymney.

Preceding station	National Rail	Following station
Bargoed	Transport for Wales; Rhymney Line	Tir-Phil
