= Tir-Phil railway station =

Railway station in Caerphilly, Wales

Tir-Phil Welsh: Tir-phil
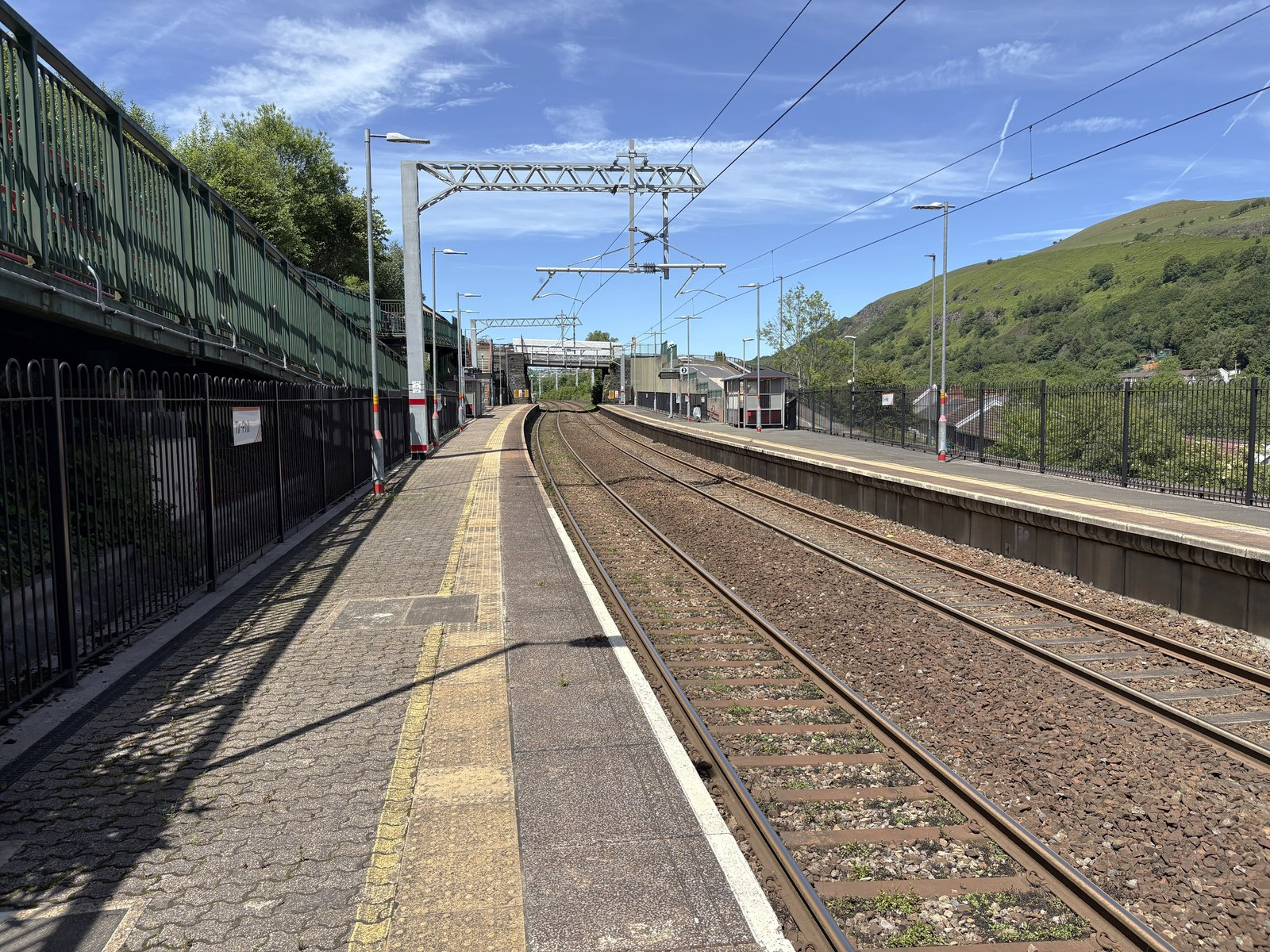

General information
- Location: Tir-Phil, Caerphilly; Wales
- Coordinates: 51°43′15″N 3°14′45″W
- Grid reference: SO140032
- Manager: Transport for Wales
- Platforms: 2

Other information
- Station code: TIR
- Classification: DfT category F2

History
- Opened: 1858

Passengers
- 2021/22: ▲17,192
- 2022/23: ▲26,168
- 2023/24: ▲28,724
- 2024/25: ▼28,360
- 2025/26: ▼18,462
Location
Notes
- Passenger statistics from the Office of Rail and Road

Tir-Phil railway station is a railway station serving the village of Tir-Phil and the town of New Tredegar, south Wales. It is a stop on the Rhymney Line of the Valley Lines network. Work to extend the platform to take the proposed six car trains has now been completed.

== History ==
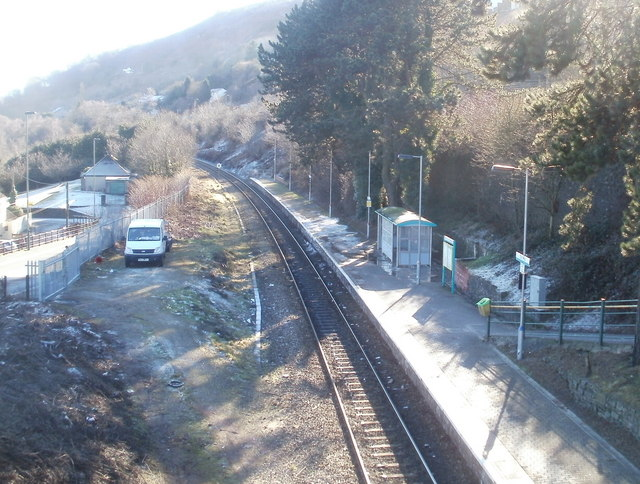
The station in January 2011

Tir-Phil station was opened in 1858 by the Rhymney Railway on the line from Cardiff to Rhymney.

New customer information screens were installed in 2012.

From 2014 (subject to rolling stock availability) the train service was due to become every 30 minutes from the current hourly frequency with the construction of a passing loop at this station and a second platform as part of the Cardiff area re-signalling scheme - the new loop & signalling were commissioned in September 2013. Arriva Trains Wales have said that they do not have the rolling stock to allow 30 minute services for the foreseeable future. The new second platform came into use on 9 September 2013, but the platform remained unfinished and no further work was done until August 2014.

The wall behind the new platform which retains the road embankment has been substantially rebuilt, and the platform has now been completed (late 2015). Work also restarted on installing a ramp on the old platform and this was first used by a mobility scooter using member of the public on the morning of 13 April 2017, some three and a half years later than originally expected.

== Services ==
Mondays to Sundays there is an hourly service southbound to Cardiff Central and Barry Island and northbound to Rhymney.

Preceding station	National Rail	Following station
Brithdir	Transport for Wales; Rhymney Line	Pontlottyn
