= Taffs Well railway station =

Railway station in Rhondda Cynon Taf, Wales

Taffs Well Welsh: Ffynnon Taf
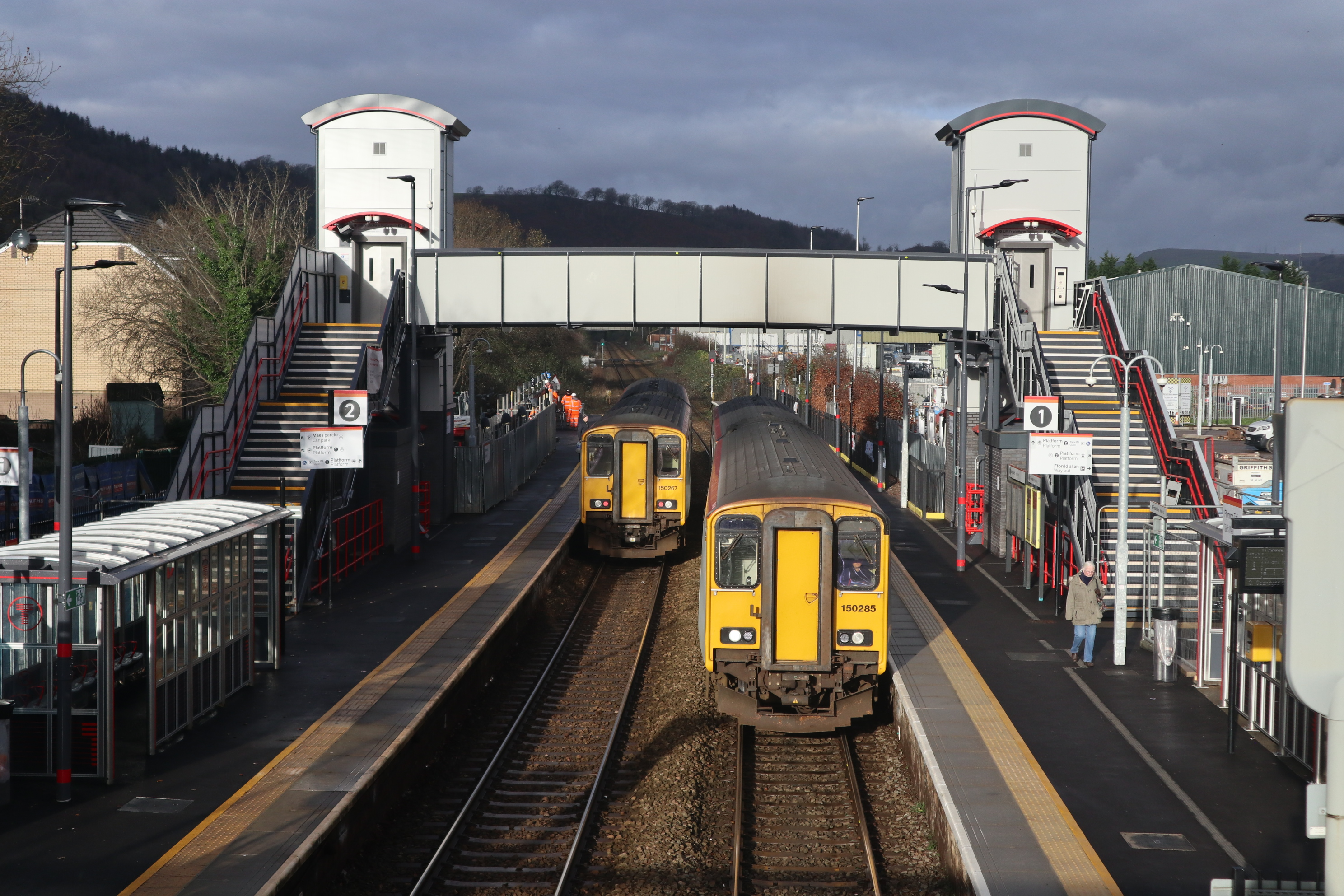

General information
- Location: Taff's Well, Rhondda Cynon Taf; Wales
- Coordinates: 51°32′27″N 3°15′49″W
- Grid reference: ST124832
- Managed by: Transport for Wales
- Platforms: 2

Other information
- Station code: TAF
- Classification: DfT category F2

History
- Opened: 9 October 1840

Key dates
- 22 June 1863: relocated and named as Walnut Tree Junction
- 1 June 1886: renamed Walnut Tree Bridge
- 16 March 1900: renamed Taffs Well

Passengers
- 2020/21: ▼37,406
- 2021/22: ▲0.144 million
- 2022/23: ▲0.165 million
- 2023/24: ▲0.191 million
- 2024/25: ▲0.257 million
Location
Notes
- Passenger statistics from the Office of Rail and Road

Taffs Well railway station is a railway station serving the village of Taff's Well, Rhondda Cynon Taf, Wales, as well as neighbouring Gwaelod-y-Garth, Cardiff. It is located on the Merthyr Line and the Rhondda Line. Passenger services are provided by Transport for Wales.

The station was first opened on this site by the Taff Vale Railway in 1863.

== Junctions ==
Two routes formerly diverged from the TVR's main line between Cardiff and Merthyr here – the Rhymney Railway's original main line northwards to Bargoed and Rhymney via Aber Junction (opened in 1858) and a much more recent spur to Nantgarw Colliery opened by British Railways in 1952 to permit the closure of most of the surviving Cardiff Railway route beyond Coryton. The Rhymney line, which diverged at Walnut Tree Junction just south of the station was known locally as the Big Hill, due to its severe gradients (as steep as 1 in 48) for northbound trains. Increasing congestion on the 'main line' south of here led to the Rhymney company opening its own direct line via Caerphilly in 1871, but after the 1923 Grouping the Great Western Railway (and later BR) made extensive use of the line for its coal trains from the many collieries in the Rhymney Valley to the marshalling yards at Radyr. Both this line and the Nantgarw colliery spur are now closed and lifted - the last train down the Big Hill ran in June 1982, whilst the latter branch was finally taken out of use in 1991 after the demise of the colliery and nearby coking works some five years earlier.

After the dismantling of the Viaduct, only one pier remains. This was used to display a goodwill message for Elizabeth II Silver and Golden Jubilee. These are still visible from the train approaching the station from the south.

== Services ==
During Monday-Saturday daytimes, there are usually six trains an hour from Cardiff Central to Pontypridd and thence to one of Treherbert, Merthyr Tydfil or Aberdare (half-hourly to each). There are six trains an hour to Cardiff Central with some trains continuing beyond Cardiff to Barry Island (3 per hour) and Bridgend via Barry (hourly). Connections for the City line can be made at Radyr, for Cardiff Bay & Coryton at Queen Street and at Central for Penarth.

The first City Line service of the day starts back from Taffs Well at 0653 to Coryton (with a 0704 departure from Radyr). There is no service in the opposite direction.

A reduced service operates in the evenings (3 trains per hour each way) and on Sundays.

Preceding station	National Rail	Following station
Radyr	Transport for Wales; Merthyr Line	Treforest Estate
Radyr	Transport for Wales; Rhondda Line	Treforest
