= Ynyswen railway station =

Railway station in Rhondda Cynon Taff, Wales

Ynyswen Welsh: Ynys-wen
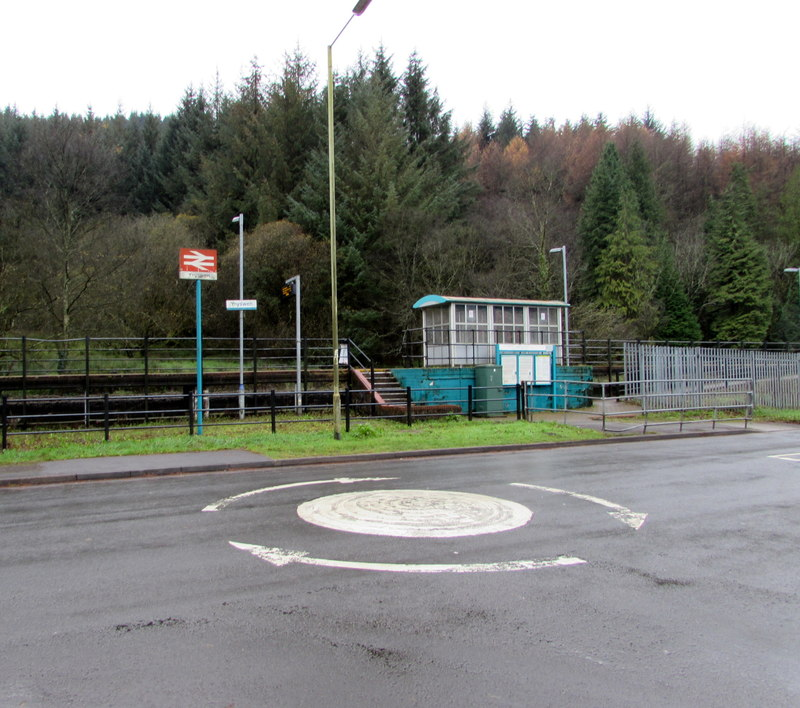
- The station, before modernisation, in 2017

General information
- Location: Ynyswen, Rhondda Cynon Taff; Wales
- Coordinates: 51°39′54″N 3°31′17″W
- Grid reference: SS948973
- Manager: Transport for Wales
- Platforms: 2

Other information
- Station code: YNW
- Classification: DfT category F2

Key dates
- 29 September 1986: Opened

Passengers
- 2021/22: ▲10,898
- 2022/23: ▲13,398
- 2023/24: ▼5,288
- 2024/25: ▼2,538
- 2025/26: ▲7,324
Location
Notes
- Passenger statistics from the Office of Rail and Road

Ynyswen railway station (Welsh pronunciation) is a railway station serving the village of Ynyswen in Rhondda Cynon Taf, south Wales. It is located on the Rhondda Line, between Treherbert and Treorchy, 22 miles 70 chains (36.8 km) from Cardiff Docks (Bute Town).

== History ==
The line through the current station opened in 1856 and passenger services started in 1863. The station was first opened on this site by British Rail on the former Taff Vale Railway on 29 September 1986.

== Facilities ==
The station has only basic facilities, including a dot matrix departure board, seating area and a ticket machine. There is step-free access by a ramp from the adjacent road. The station does not have a help point.

== Passenger volume ==
Passenger Volume at Ynyswen
	2002–03	2004–05	2005–06	2006–07	2007–08	2008–09	2009–10	2010–11	2011–12	2012–13	2013–14	2014–15	2015–16	2016–17	2017–18	2018–19	2019–20	2020–21	2021–22	2022–23
Entries and exits	24,932	8,162	6,535	9,101	8,588	12,918	12,858	7,754	7,524	9,782	9,730	10,064	9,376	13,346	12,766	10,940	11,210	1,706	10,898	13,398

The statistics cover twelve month periods that start in April.

== Services ==
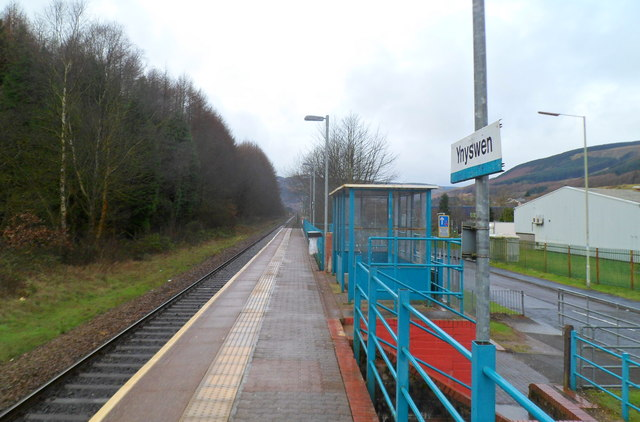
The platform at Ynyswen before electrification

Mondays to Saturdays there is a service every 30 minutes to Treherbert and to Cardiff Central during the day, dropping to hourly after 8pm. On Sundays there is a two hourly service in each direction, with through trains to Barry Island.

On 20 July 2018, previous franchise operator Arriva Trains Wales announced a trial period of extra Sunday services on the Rhondda Line to Cardiff and Barry Island. This was in response to a survey by Leanne Wood and the success of extra Sunday services on the Merthyr Line and the Rhymney Line.

The service from this station was suspended from Summer 2023, due to major route upgrade work being carried out at multiple locations as part of the Valley Lines electrification scheme. The work included upgrading the station with a second platform and an accessible footbridge. A replacement bus service was in operation from to Pontypridd and Treherbert, calling at all local stations, until February 2024. Rail services resumed from the station following the timetable change on 14 December 2025.

Preceding station	National Rail	Following station
Treorchy	Transport for Wales; Rhondda Line	Treherbert

== Bibliography ==
- Quick, Michael (2023). Railway Passenger Stations in Great Britain: A Chronology (PDF) (5th ed.). London: Railway and Canal Historical Society.
