= Pontlottyn railway station =

Railway station in Caerphilly, Wales

Pontlottyn Welsh: Pontlotyn
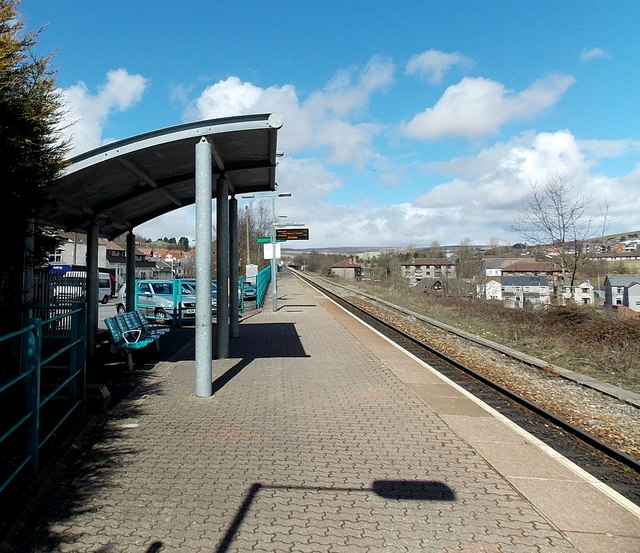

General information
- Location: Pontlottyn, Caerphilly; Wales
- Coordinates: 51°44′48″N 3°16′46″W
- Grid reference: SO117061
- Manager: Transport for Wales
- Platforms: 1

Other information
- Station code: PLT
- Classification: DfT category F2

History
- Opened: September 1859

Passengers
- 2021/22: ▲20,840
- 2022/23: ▲34,918
- 2023/24: ▲35,376
- 2024/25: ▼31,640
- 2025/26: ▼22,356
Location
Notes
- Passenger statistics from the Office of Rail and Road

Pontlottyn railway station is a railway station serving the village of Pontlottyn, south Wales. It is a stop on the Rhymney Line of the Transport for Wales network.

== Facilities ==
New customer information screens were installed in 2012.

== Service ==
Mondays to Sundays there is an hourly service southbound to Cardiff Central and Barry Island and northbound to Rhymney.

Preceding station	National Rail	Following station
Tir-Phil	Transport for Wales; Rhymney Line	Rhymney
