= Treorchy railway station =

Railway station in Rhondda Cynon Taf, Wales

Treorchy Welsh: Treorci
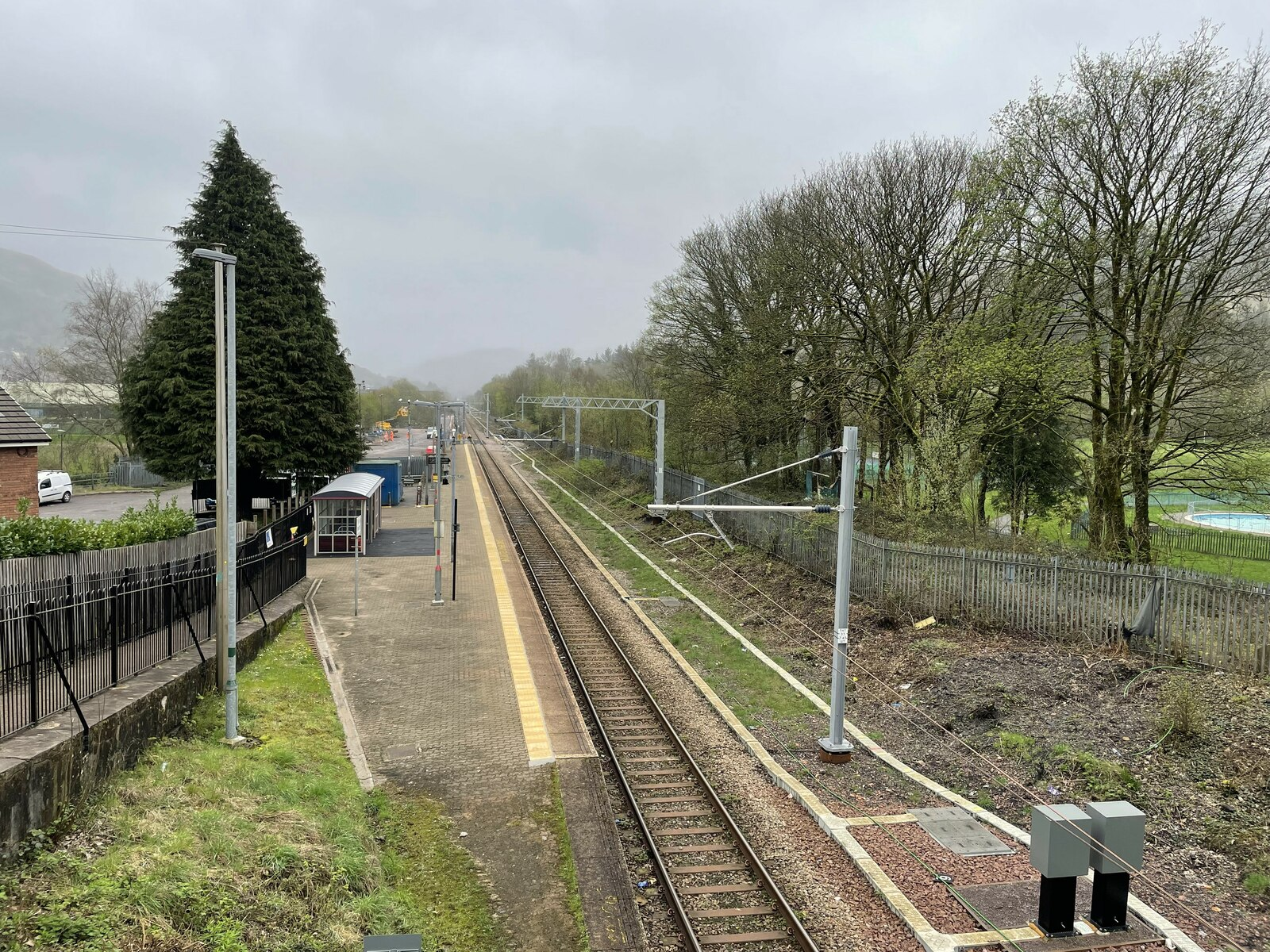

General information
- Location: Treorchy, Rhondda Cynon Taf; Wales
- Coordinates: 51°39′27″N 3°30′22″W
- Grid reference: SS959964
- Managed by: Transport for Wales
- Platforms: 1

Other information
- Station code: TRY
- Classification: DfT category F1

Key dates
- 27 September 1869: Opened as Treorky
- 3 March 1884: Resited
- 1892 or 1904: Renamed to Treorchy

Passengers
- 2020/21: ▼20,242
- 2021/22: ▲77,888
- 2022/23: ▲83,404
- 2023/24: ▼60,916
- 2024/25: ▲0.125 million
Location
Notes
- Passenger statistics from the Office of Rail and Road

Treorchy railway station is a railway station serving the town of Treorchy and village of Cwmparc in Rhondda Cynon Taf, Wales. It is located on the Rhondda Line, between Ynyswen and Ton Pentre, 22 miles 2 chains (35.4 km) from Cardiff Docks (Bute Town).

== History ==
The first station in the town opened as Treorky on 27 September 1869 by the Taff Vale Railway, though the line had existed since 1849. It moved to its current site in 1884, and was renamed to Treorchy in either 1892 or 1904. It was subsequently taken over by the Great Western Railway as part of the Railways Act 1921. The line through the station was reduced to single track on 6 January 1972.

=== Accidents and incidents ===
In January 2007, a boy was killed by an oncoming train at the station, because he was listening to an MP3 player with headphones and did not hear it approaching.

== Location and facilities ==
The station is on the western side of the town, on the road to the village of Cwmparc. There is a single platform, a shelter with seating and a help point, a ticket machine, and a free car park.

== Passenger volume ==
Passenger Volume at Treorchy
	2002–03	2004–05	2005–06	2006–07	2007–08	2008–09	2009–10	2010–11	2011–12	2012–13	2013–14	2014–15	2015–16	2016–17	2017–18	2018–19	2019–20	2020–21	2021–22	2022–23
Entries and exits	153,789	80,757	65,784	90,115	159,050	189,884	218,766	64,980	67,498	76,870	74,438	77,848	70,864	186,526	169,948	151,064	132,890	20,242	77,888	83,404

The statistics cover twelve month periods that start in April.

== Services ==
Monday-Saturday, there is a half-hourly service to Cardiff Central Southbound and to Treherbert Northbound. There is a two hourly service in each direction on Sundays. In July 2018, previous franchise operator Arriva Trains Wales announced a trial period of extra Sunday services on the Rhondda Line to Cardiff and Barry Island. This was in response to a survey by local AM Leanne Wood and the success of extra Sunday services on the Merthyr Line and the Rhymney Line.

The Rhondda line was electrified in 2024. This allows faster journeys from Cardiff to Treorchy, encouraging the local economy.

The services from this station were suspended in Summer 2023, due to major route upgrade work being carried out at multiple locations as part of the Valley Lines electrification scheme. A replacement bus service operated between Pontypridd and to Treherbert, calling at all local stations, until February 2024. Rail services resumed at the station from 26 February 2024 following completion of the majority of the infrastructure works.

Preceding station	National Rail	Following station
Ton Pentre	Transport for Wales; Rhondda Line	Ynyswen

== Bibliography ==
- Butt, R. V. J. (1995). The Directory of Railway Stations. Yeovil: Patrick Stephens Ltd. ISBN 1-85260-508-1.
- Quick, Michael (2023). Railway Passenger Stations in Great Britain: A Chronology (PDF) (5th ed.). London: Railway and Canal Historical Society.
