= Merthyr Vale railway station =

Railway station in Merthyr Tydfil, Wales

Merthyr Vale Welsh: Ynysowen
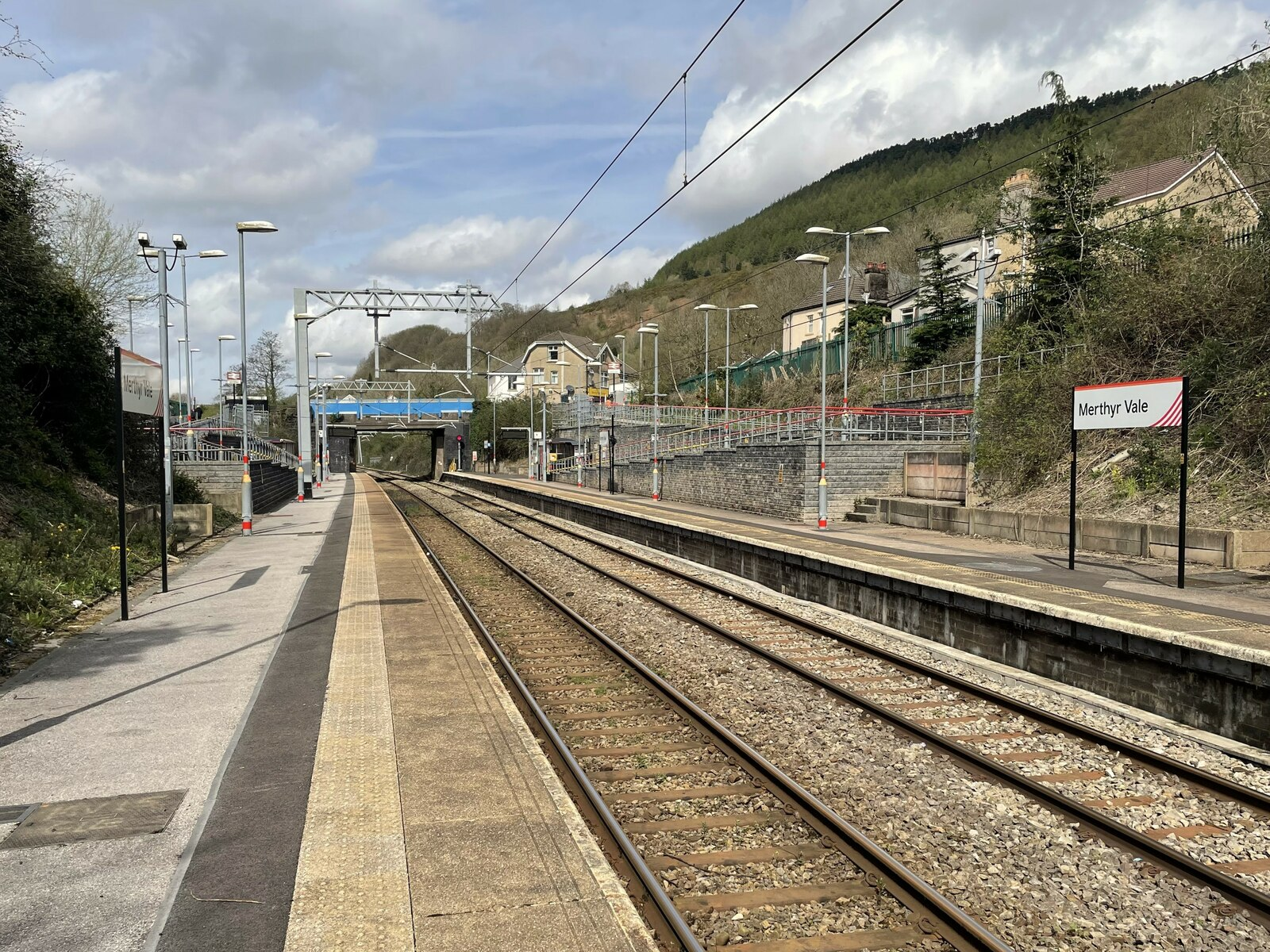

General information
- Location: Merthyr Vale, Merthyr Tydfil; Wales
- Coordinates: 51.6866°N 3.3370°W
- Grid reference: ST076995
- Managed by: Transport for Wales
- Platforms: 2

Other information
- Station code: MEV
- Classification: DfT category F2

Key dates
- 1 June 1883: Opened

Passengers
- 2020/21: ▼7,932
- 2021/22: ▲31,002
- 2022/23: ▲40,706
- 2023/24: ▲44,080
- 2024/25: ▲59,920
Location
Notes
- Passenger statistics from the Office of Rail and Road

Merthyr Vale railway station serves the villages of Merthyr Vale and Aberfan in Merthyr Tydfil, Wales. It is located on the Merthyr branch of the Merthyr Line. Passenger services are provided by Transport for Wales.

== History ==
The station was first opened by the Taff Vale Railway in 1883. It is shown briefly in Richard Fleischer's 1971 film 10 Rillington Place, starring Richard Attenborough and John Hurt. When Timothy Evans (Hurt) returns to Wales, he is seen walking from the station.

Since 2008, the station has had a passing loop installed which allowed a half-hourly service to be introduced on the branch from the May 2009 timetable change. Previously, until 1991, a loop had existed at Black Lion Crossing, a short distance to the south, which also controlled the siding connections into Merthyr Vale Colliery.

== Services ==
The station has a basic half-hourly service in each direction (Mon-Sat): northbound to Merthyr Tydfil and southbound to Pontypridd, Radyr, and Cardiff Central. On Sunday, there is an hourly service each way to Merthyr and Cardiff Central.

Preceding station	National Rail	Following station
Quakers Yard	Transport for Wales; Merthyr branch	Troed-y-rhiw
