= Troed-y-rhiw railway station =

Railway station in Merthyr Tydfil, Wales

Troed-y-rhiw
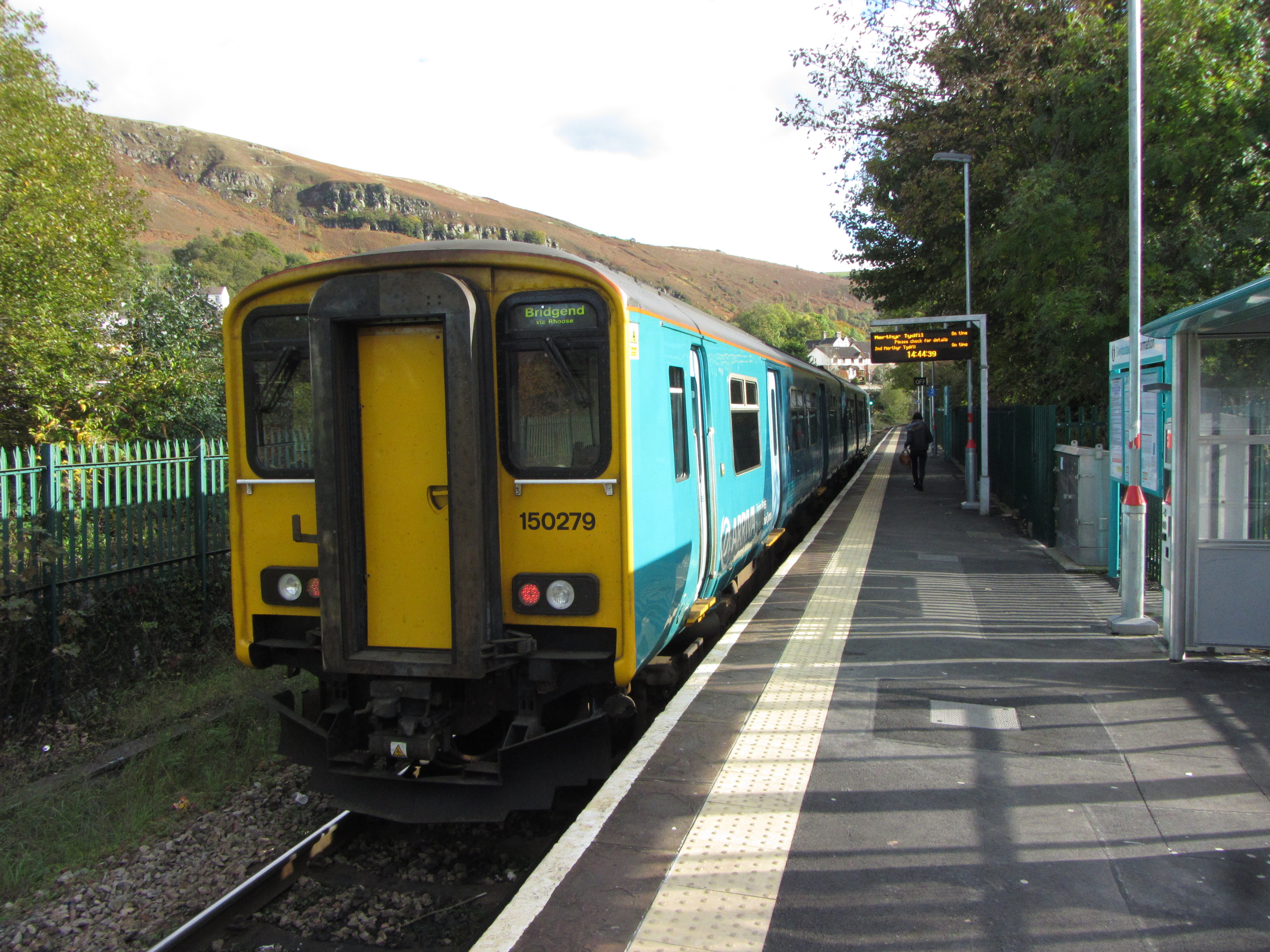

General information
- Location: Troed-y-rhiw, Merthyr Tydfil; Wales
- Coordinates: 51.7120°N 3.3464°W
- Grid reference: SO070023
- Manager: Transport for Wales
- Platforms: 1

Other information
- Station code: TRD
- Classification: DfT category F2

Key dates
- 1841: Opened

Passengers
- 2021/22: ▲25,270
- 2022/23: ▲33,662
- 2023/24: ▼31,960
- 2024/25: ▲40,862
- 2025/26: ▲50,162
Location
Notes
- Passenger statistics from the Office of Rail and Road

Troed-y-rhiw railway station serves the village of Troed-y-rhiw in Merthyr Tydfil, Wales. It is located on the Merthyr branch of the Merthyr Line. Passenger services are provided by Transport for Wales.

== History ==
The station was opened by the Taff Vale Railway in late 1841, though it did not appear in Bradshaw's timetables until 1844. It was named Troedyrhiew from 1846/47 until 1 July 1924 when it became Troedyrhiw; the hyphens were added on 12 May 1980.

== Services ==
The station has a basic half-hourly service in each direction (Mon-Sat): northbound to Merthyr Tydfil and southbound to Pontypridd, Radyr, and Cardiff Central. On Sunday, there is an hourly service each way to Merthyr and Cardiff Central.

Preceding station	National Rail	Following station
Merthyr Vale	Transport for Wales; Merthyr Line	Pentre-bach
