= Pentre-bach railway station =

Railway station in Merthyr Tydfil, Wales

Pentre-bach
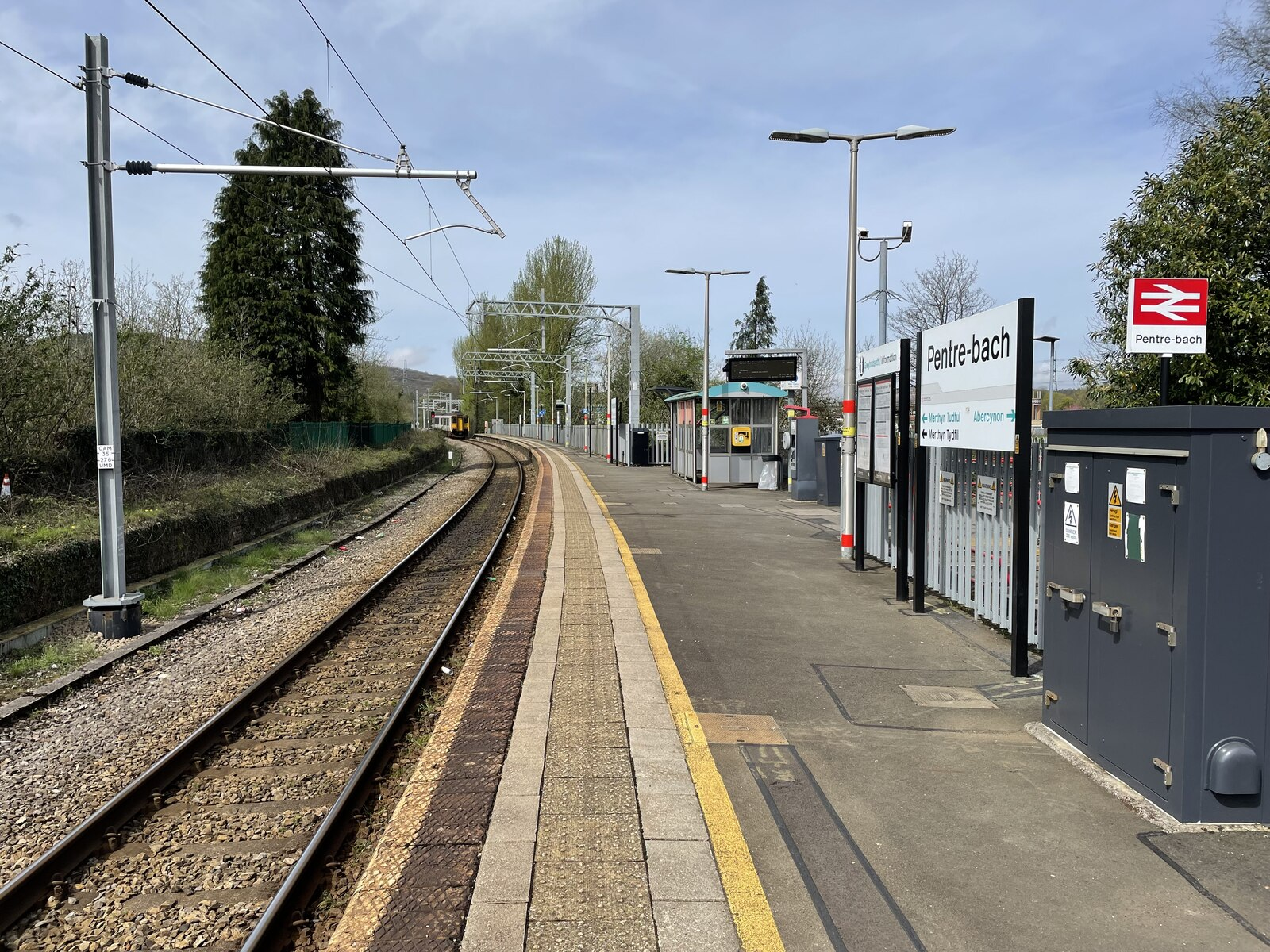

General information
- Location: Pentrebach, Merthyr Tydfil; Wales
- Coordinates: 51.7250°N 3.3626°W
- Grid reference: SO060037
- Manager: Transport for Wales
- Platforms: 1

Other information
- Station code: PTB
- Classification: DfT category F2

Key dates
- 1 August 1886: Opened

Passengers
- 2021/22: ▲18,372
- 2022/23: ▲19,464
- 2023/24: ▼19,098
- 2024/25: ▲30,388
- 2025/26: ▲40,714
Location
Notes
- Passenger statistics from the Office of Rail and Road

Pentre-bach railway station serves the villages of Pentrebach and Abercanaid in Merthyr Tydfil, Wales. It is located on the Merthyr branch of the Merthyr Line. Passenger services are provided by Transport for Wales.

== History ==
The station was first opened by the Taff Vale Railway in 1886.

== Service ==
Transport for Wales operates a basic half-hourly service in each direction (Mon-Sat): northbound to Merthyr Tydfil and southbound to Pontypridd, Radyr and Cardiff Central. On Sunday, there is an hourly service each way to Merthyr and Cardiff Central.

Preceding station	National Rail	Following station
Troed-y-rhiw	Transport for Wales; Merthyr Line	Merthyr Tydfil
