= Ty Glas railway station =

Railway station in Cardiff, Wales

Ty Glas Welsh: Tŷ Glas
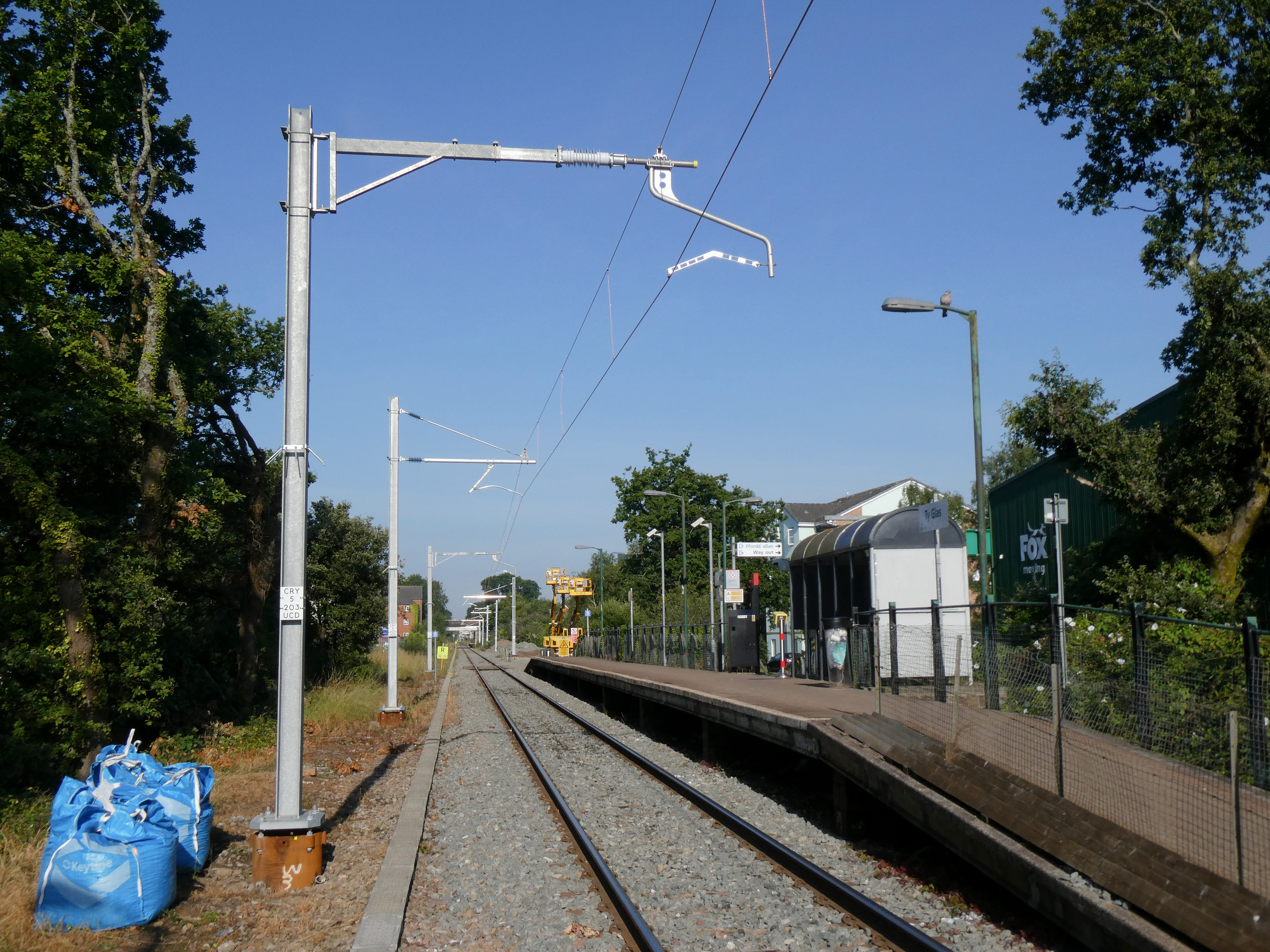

General information
- Location: Llanishen, Cardiff; Wales
- Coordinates: 51°31′18″N 3°11′50″W
- Grid reference: ST171809
- Manager: Transport for Wales
- Platforms: 1

Other information
- Station code: TGS
- Classification: DfT category F2

Key dates
- 29 April 1987: Opened

Passengers
- 2021/22: ▲37,870
- 2022/23: ▲71,118
- 2023/24: ▲95,876
- 2024/25: ▼94,494
- 2025/26: ▼30,174
Location
Notes
- Passenger statistics from the Office of Rail and Road

Ty Glas railway station is a railway station serving business and industrial sites in Llanishen and Heath, Cardiff, Wales. It is located on the Coryton Line 3.7 miles (6.0 km) north of Cardiff Central. Ty Glas is 17 chains (340 m) from the next station along at Birchgrove.

Ty Glas station reopened after a period of modernisation and refurbishment on 7 April 2026, including work to extend the platform to accommodate the new 3 car Class 756 FLIRT trains. The station also received step-free boarding and a safer level crossing.

The Coryton branch line is single-track, though unlike other stations on the branch, Ty Glas has entrances at both the north and south of the station; access from the south requires passengers to cross the track to reach the platform sited on the north side of the track.

Passenger services are provided by Transport for Wales as part of the Valley Lines network.

== Services ==
Monday to Saturday, there is a half-hourly service southbound to Cardiff Central and onwards to Penarth and to Coryton northbound. An hourly Sunday service was introduced each way for the first time in 2025.

Preceding station	National Rail	Following station
Birchgrove	Transport for Wales; Coryton Line	Heath Low Level

== See also ==
- List of railway stations in Cardiff
