= Rhiwbina =

Suburb and community of Cardiff, Wales

Rhiwbina: Welsh: Rhiwbeina, Rhiwbina
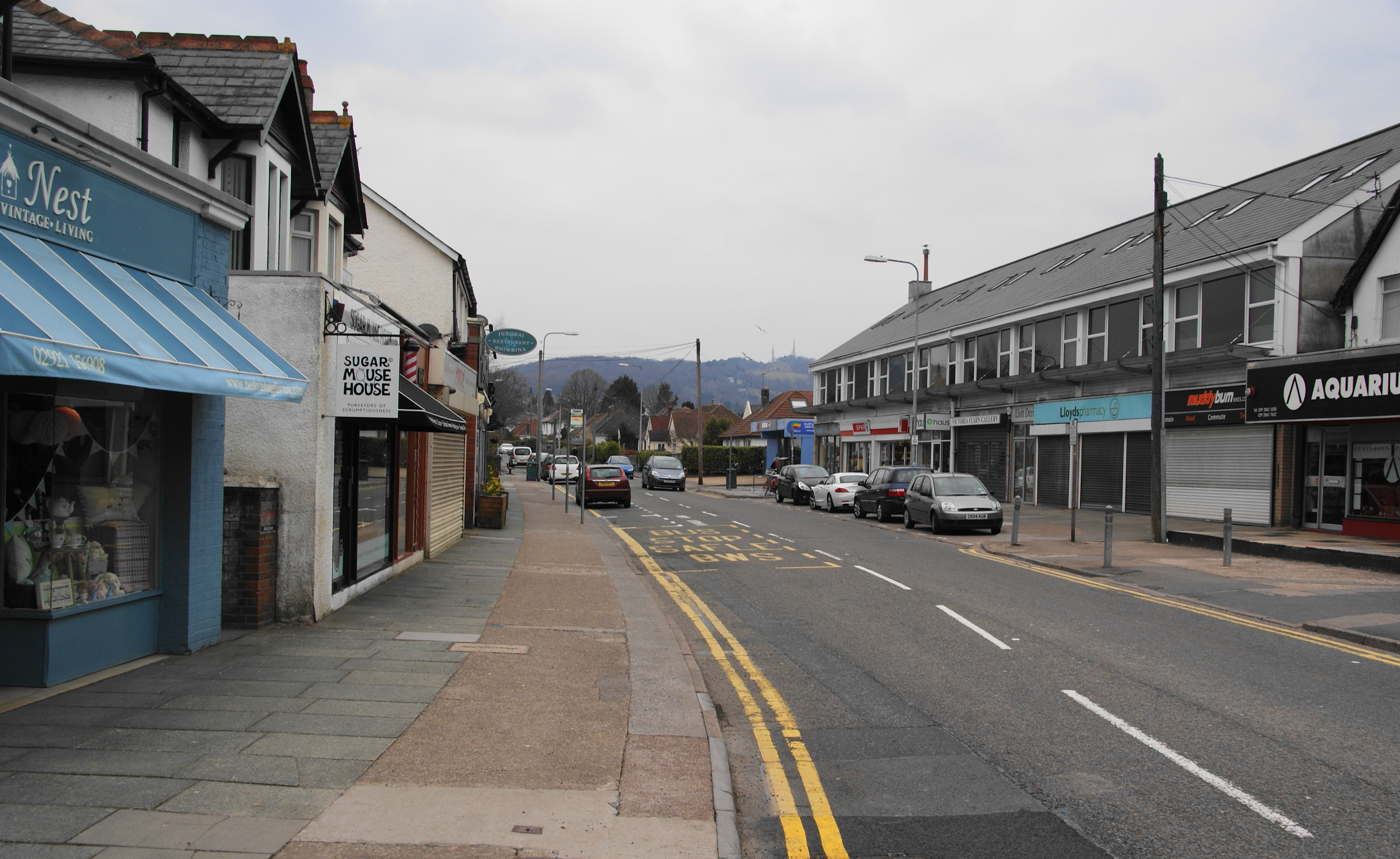
- Rhiwbina village

- Location within Cardiff
- Population: 11,369 (2011 Census)
- Principal area: Cardiff
- Preserved county: Cardiff
- Country: Wales
- Sovereign state: United Kingdom
- Post town: CARDIFF
- Postcode district: CF14
- Dialling code: 029
- Police: South Wales
- Fire: South Wales
- Ambulance: Welsh
- UK Parliament: Cardiff North
- Senedd Cymru – Welsh Parliament: Cardiff North
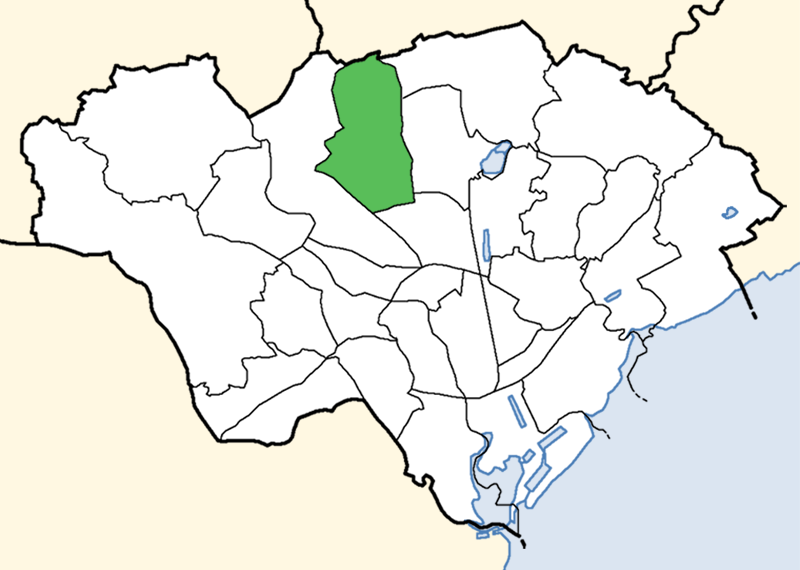
- List of places UK Wales Cardiff 51.5211°N 3.2140°W

Rhiwbina (/ruˈbaɪnə/; Welsh: Rhiwbeina [r̥ɪuˈbɛina], also Rhiwbina) is a suburb and community in the north of Cardiff, the capital of Wales. Formerly a small hamlet within the parish of Whitchurch, Rhiwbina was developed throughout the twentieth century, and is now a separate ward. It retains aspects of its former character, however, and is given a Welsh village appearance by Beulah United Reformed Church (originally Capel Beulah) at the village crossroads.

Modern Rhiwbina, which includes Rhiwbina Garden Village, Wenallt Hill, Rhiwbina Hill, Rhydwaedlyd and the Llanishen Fach and Pantmawr developments, is bordered by the suburbs of Whitchurch (Yr Eglwys Newydd) to the west, Llanishen to the east, and Birchgrove (Llwynbedw) to the south. To the north is the border with Caerphilly. The area is served by Rhiwbina railway station on the Coryton Line.

== Etymology and pronunciation ==
The earliest records of a settlement in the area are found in the 12th century Book of Llandaff. This records that Rhiwallon, son of Rhan, gave up his "Rhiwbrien" property and that it be transferred to the Bishop in 1040. A papal bull of Honorius II, also records that "Rhiwbrien" was part of the Bishop's holdings in 1129. The modern name, Rhiwbina is first documented in a 1630 survey of the Cantref of Senghenydd; it states that the ground on which the ruins of Castell Coch stood belonged to "Henry Morgan of Rhiwbyna". The name also appears in a Will of 1708 as Rhiwhina and in 1777 as Rhubina.

Although the first element is unanimously agreed to derive from rhiw (meaning a slope or ascent, matching Rhiwbina's topography), there is no agreed etymology for the second. The suggestions for pina, from the local Welsh dialect form of pinau (pine-trees) and for pannier (referring to the panniers of the mules carrying iron through the village from Caerphilly to Cardiff) have both been rejected as the name appears to predate both ironworking in Caerphilly and the introduction of pine trees to the area. A popular folk etymology states that the name derives from Rhiw Beuno (with Beuno likely referring to St Beuno).

Archive recordings of Welsh speakers from the area all pronounce the penultimate vowel as /i:/ (Rhiw-BE-na). However, as the village developed throughout the 20th century, the number of people with Welsh as their first language continued to decline. This demographic shift saw the name often mispronounced by those unfamiliar with Welsh orthography, and pronouncing the name with a penultimate diphthong, /aɪ/ (Rhiw-BYE-na) instead.

To better reflect the original and new pronunciations, the village is one of only eight settlements in Wales to have two standardised Welsh spellings, Rhiwbina and Rhiwbeina.

== History ==
Near the summit of the Wenallt, to the north of Rhiwbina, are the remains of an oval encampment probably dating from the Iron Age, the earliest evidence of settlement in the area. At the base of the hill is a medieval motte called the Twmpath Castle, which is a scheduled monument.

The last native Welsh Prince of Morgannwg (Glamorgan), Iestyn ap Gwrgant, may have been killed in a battle north of Rhiwbina towards the end of the 11th century, near the present-day Butchers Arms public house. The stream nearby is still called Rhyd Waedlyd, which means 'Bloody Ford'. Rhydwaedlyd was the title given to housing developments to Rhiwbina's east in the latter half of the 20th century. This area has since come to be considered part of Rhiwbina itself and the name 'Rhydwaedlyd' has fallen out of use entirely.

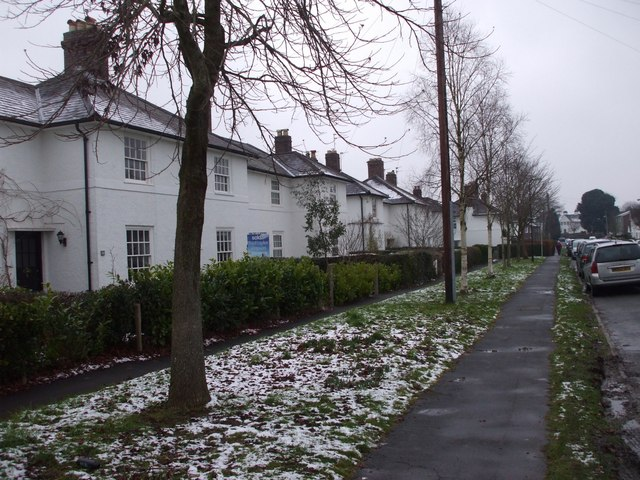
Garden village housing

Until the 20th century the area remained rural, with few houses. The railway station opened in 1911, and the following year development began of Rhiwbina Garden Village, a new garden suburb based on a masterplan by Sir Raymond Unwin, one of the leading architects of the Garden city movement. The first 34 houses were built in 1913 and more were built from 1919 to 1923, occupying an area between Pen-y-dre and Lon Isa which became known as Rhiwbina Garden Village. It was designated as a Conservation Area in 1976.

Rhiwbina village centre is small compared to nearby Whitchurch and Birchgrove, but has in recent years undergone a revival, and is now a popular shopping destination for gifts and art.

== Amenities ==
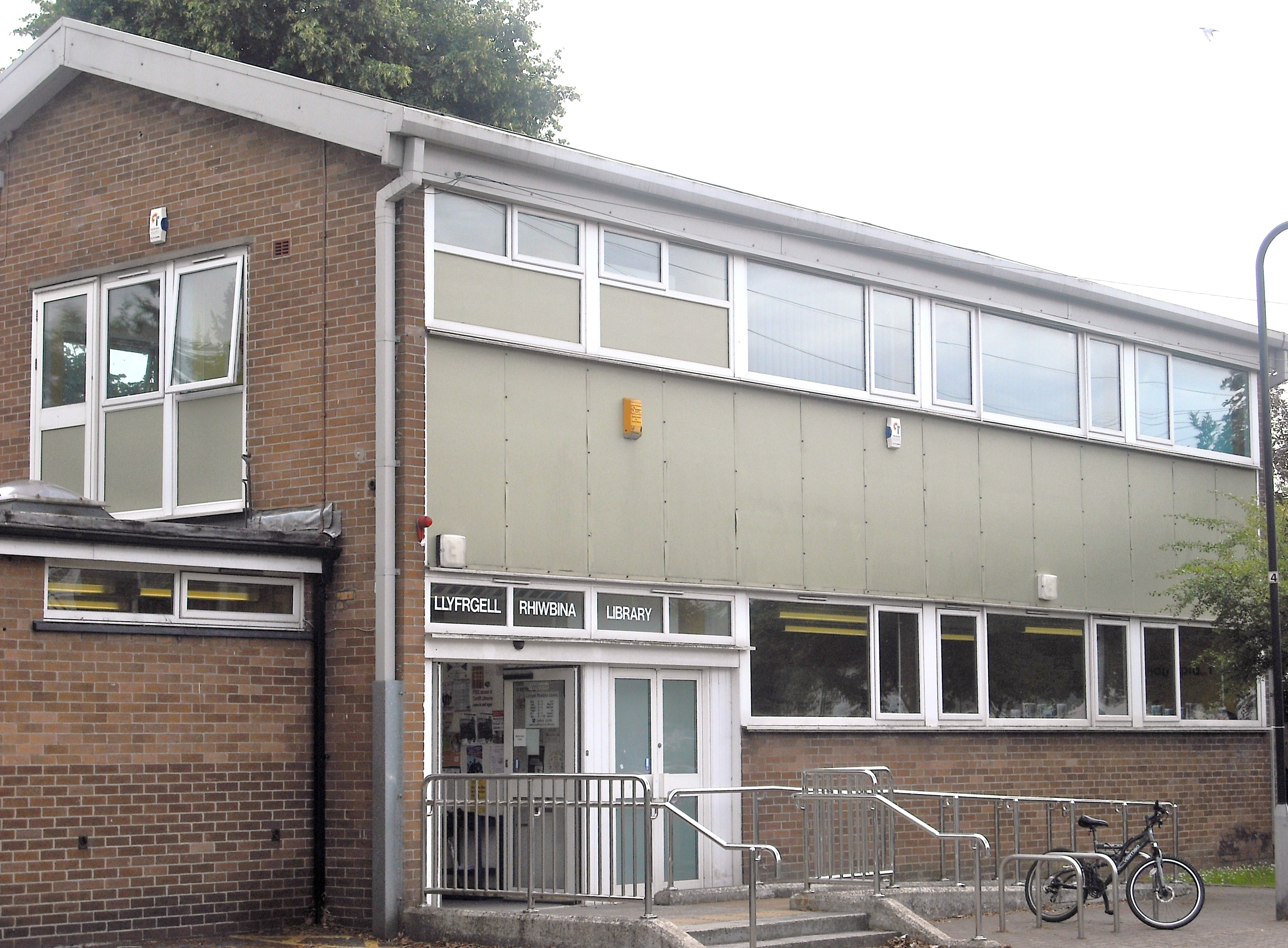
Rhiwbina Library

There are three schools within the ward – Rhiwbina Primary School, Llanishen Fach Primary School and Greenhill School. Llanishen Fach is the only school in Cardiff which sends its Year 6 pupils to two main secondary schools, Whitchurch High, and Llanishen High. Rhiwbina currently has no Welsh-medium school. As a result, some local children travel to the nearby Ysgol y Wern and Ysgol Melin Griffith to receive their education.

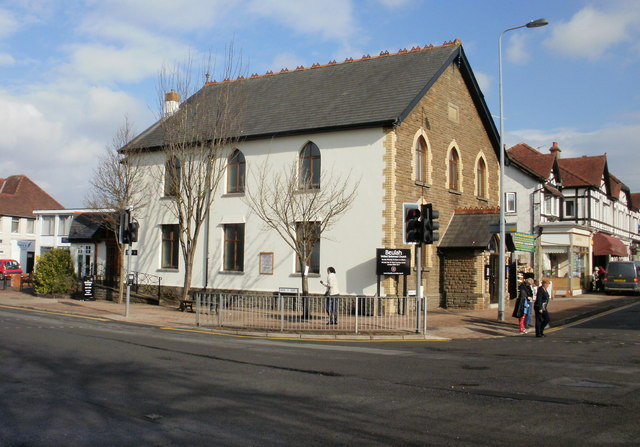
Beulah United Reformed Church, Rhiwbina village

The area has a large number of churches and chapels including All Saints (Church in Wales), Beulah (URC), Bethesda (Independent), Rhiwbina Baptist Church, Bethany (Baptist), Bethel (Methodist) and the Church of Jesus Christ of Latter-day Saints (LDS Church).

To the north of Rhiwbina is a parade of shops on Heol Llanishen Fach, built in the 1960s to serve an extensive area of new housing. Also to the north of Rhiwbina village is the Deri Stores, a family run shop on the corner of Wenallt Road and Rhiwbina Hill which used to be a post office, and before that a cafe. Another parade of shops was built further north at Pantmawr, but has since been demolished and replaced by houses.

Since 1997 the 'Deri' community quarterly newsletter has been published by the Rhiwbina Civic Society. Rhiwbina also has a quarterly magazine launched on 15 November 2007, called Rhiwbina Living. A similar publication, "Wenallt", was published between 1972 and 1980 but failed due to a lack of local advertising. A hyperlocal news and information website Rhiwbina Info has operated since 2013.

== The Welsh language ==
The number of Rhiwbina residents over the age of three who speak Welsh increased slightly from 1,409 (12.8%) in the 2001 UK Census to 1,433 (12.9%) in the 2011 UK Census.

Beulah United Reformed Church was originally a Welsh-speaking congregationalist chapel, but the services turned to English in 1898. Bethel Methodist Church continues to hold Welsh-language services.

Rhiwbina has been the home of many notable figures in Welsh-language culture, including W. J. Gruffydd, R. T. Jenkins, Iorwerth Peate and Kate Roberts.

== Governance ==
The electoral ward of Rhiwbina falls within the parliamentary constituency of Cardiff North. It is bounded by the wards of Lisvane and Llanishen to the east; Heath to the southeast; and Whitchurch & Tongwynlais to the west.

- Cardiff Council: The ward returns three councillors to Cardiff Council. Rhiwbina is represented by Jayne Cowan (Conservative), Adrian Robson (Conservative) and Oliver Owen (Conservative).
- Senedd Cymru: Part of the Cardiff North constituency within the Senedd, it is represented by Julie Morgan MS (Welsh Labour).
- Westminster: Part of the Cardiff North constituency within the Parliament, it is represented by Anna McMorrin MP Welsh Labour, who has held the seat since 2017, taking it from the former Welsh Conservative Party MP Craig Williams.

== Transport ==
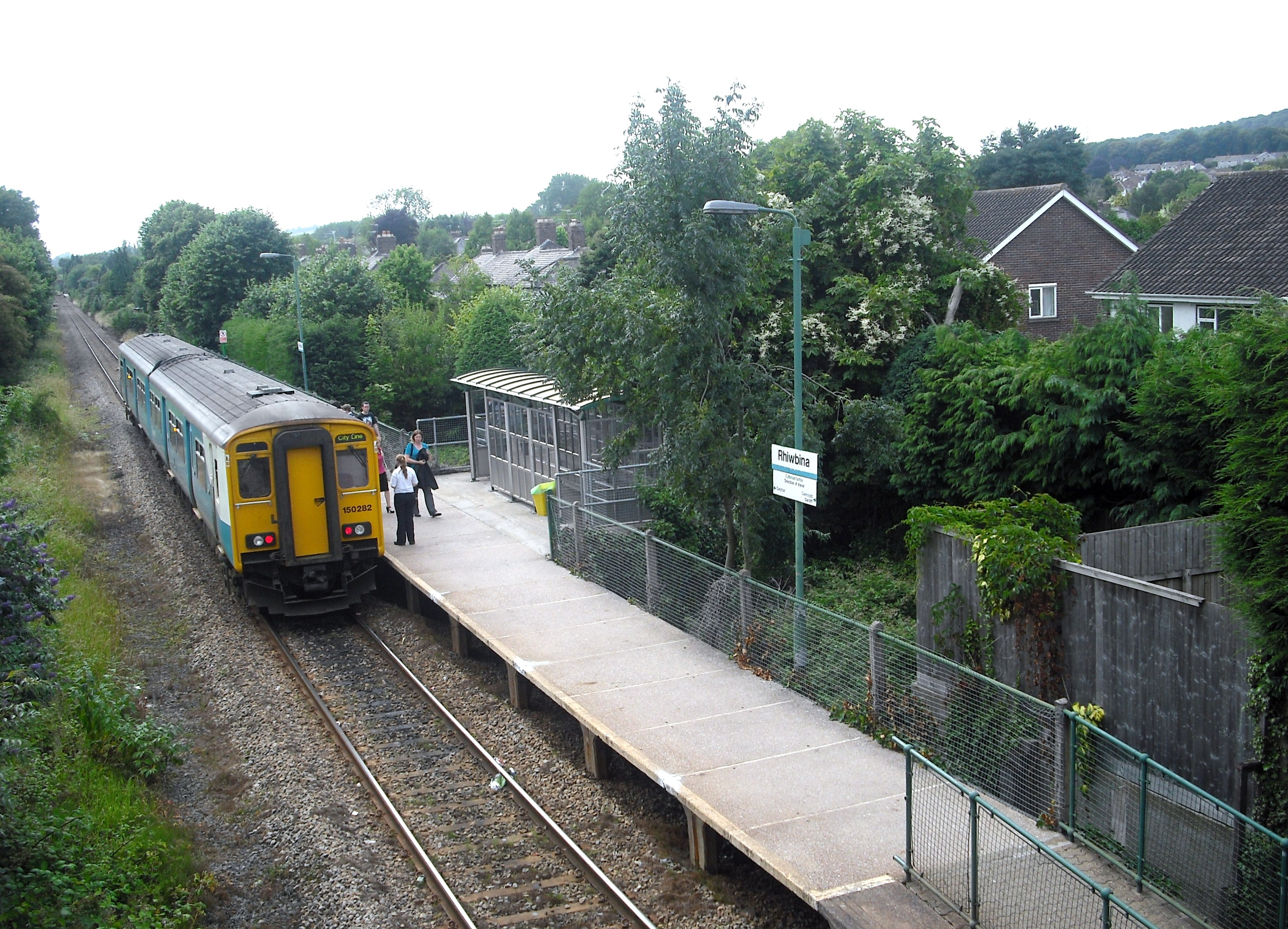
Rhiwbina railway station

There are three railway stations located within Rhiwbina. The principal station is Rhiwbina railway station, located behind the library in the heart of the village. The other two stations are Birchgrove railway station, located in the east of the ward, and Whitchurch railway station, Cardiff in the west. These two stations were built (as their names suggest) to service other adjacent areas, but the expansion of Rhiwbina and its clear demarcation from Whitchurch has meant that all three stations are now located within the boundaries of the ward. All of the stations are on the Cardiff Central to Coryton Line, and were built by the Cardiff Railway Company. Presently, services continue through west Cardiff via the City Line to Radyr.

Cardiff Bus services 21 (Central Station - Gabalfa - Birchgrove - Whitchurch - Coryton - Rhiwbina) and 23 (Central Station - Gabalfa - Birchgrove - Rhiwbina - Coryton - Whitchurch) frequently run through the area. Crossgates Coaches also ran service 22 (Heath Hospital – Rhiwbina) but this route ceased running in 2013.

Heol-y-Deri is the main road leading through the district. Rhiwbina is situated between the A470 (Cardiff City Centre to M4 J32) and A469 (Cardiff city centre to Caerphilly).

== Sport and leisure ==
Rhiwbina Recreation Club is a centre of activities within the community, and is home to tennis, rugby, squash, bowls and table tennis clubs.

Rhiwbina RFC, the local rugby union club operates sides from Under 7 to Under 16, plus a youth and three senior teams. The First XV was promoted to Division 4 East after an unbeaten League run in Season 2006–07. The club operates from the Rhiwbina Recreational Club.

Rhiwbina Squash Club has men's teams playing in the Premier, South Wales and South Glamorgan Leagues. The club also has a Junior and Ladies section. Rhiwbina Squash Club were the 2011 South Wales Premier League Champions.

== Notable people ==
- Andrew Davies, (born 1936), author and screenwriter, was born in Rhiwbina.
- Gerald Davies, (born 1945), Welsh rugby player in the 1970s, lived in Wenallt Road, Rhiwbina.
- Andy Fairweather Low, (born 1948), pop musician, lived in Heol Wen, Rhiwbina.
- Polly James, (fl. 2010s -) television and radio presenter lived in the area as a child.
- Howard Jones, (born 1955), pop musician, lived in Rhiwbina until the age of 13.
- Jack Jones, (1884–1970), novelist, lived in Rhiwbina in the 1920s.
- T. Alwyn Lloyd, (1881–1960), architect, designed several houses in Rhiwbina Garden Village, including his own house, Hafod Llwyd, 11 Heol Wen, now a listed building
- Rhodri Morgan, (1939–2017), politician, lived in Rhiwbina Garden Village.
- Evan Roberts, (1878–1951), minister, lived on Beulah Road many years after the 1904–1905 Revival.
- Kate Roberts, (1891–1985), novelist, lived in Rhiwbina from 1929 to 1931.
- Keith Rowlands, (1936–2006), rugby player for Wales and the British and Irish Lions, lived in Rhiwbina in retirement and was president of Rhiwbina RFC and in 2004, he became Welsh Rugby Union President.
- Stan Stennett, (1925–2013), entertainer, lived in Rhiwbina.
- Sam Warburton, (born 1988), captain of the Wales and British and Irish Lions rugby union teams. He has lived most of his life in Rhiwbina and still resides there.
- Alan Wilkins, (born 1953), cricketer and sports commentator, was born and grew up in Rhiwbina.
