= Heath Low Level railway station =

Railway station in Cardiff, Wales

Heath Low Level Welsh: Lefel Isel y Mynydd Bychan
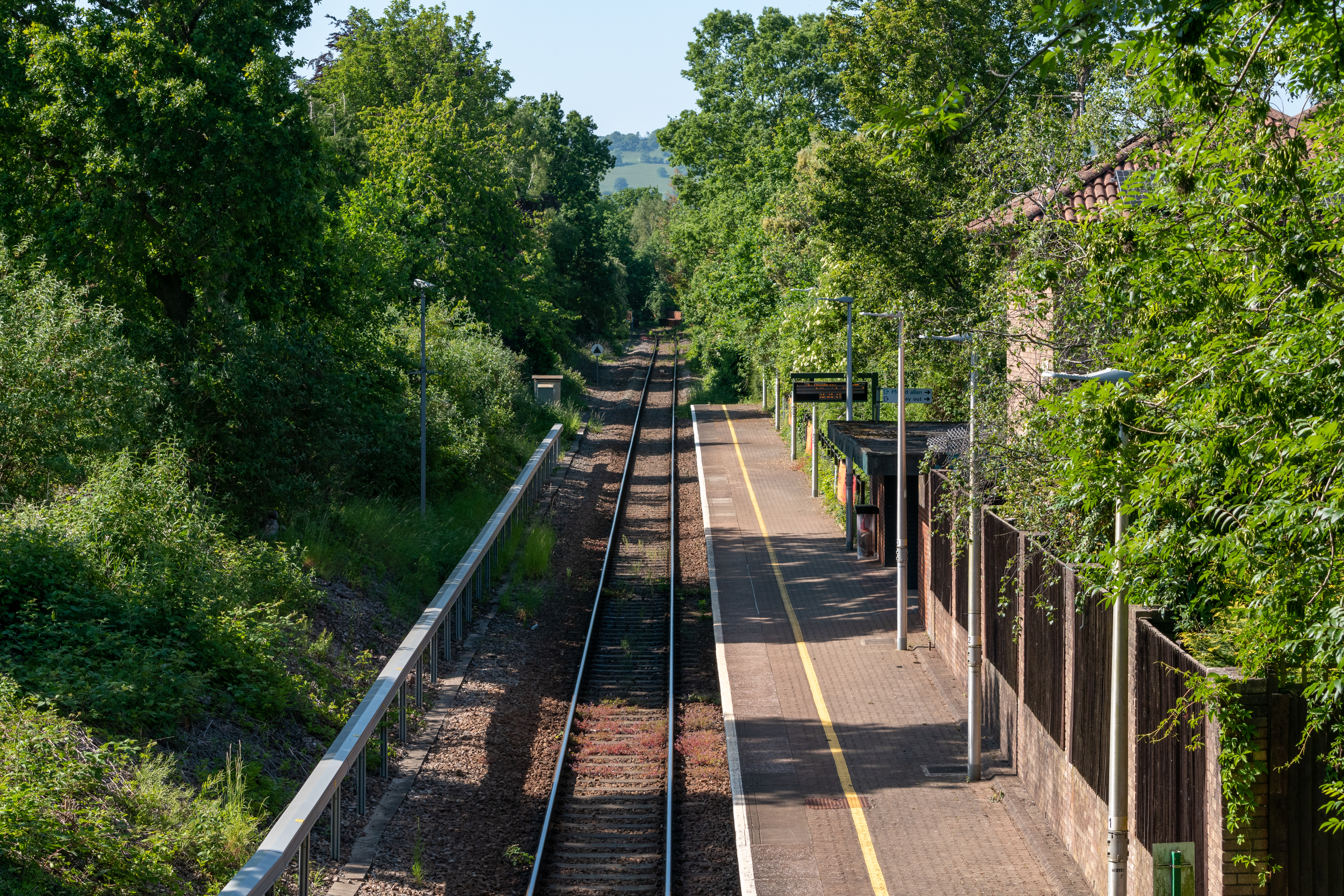

General information
- Location: Heath, Cardiff; Wales
- Coordinates: 51°30′57″N 3°10′56″W
- Grid reference: ST180803
- Manager: Transport for Wales
- Platforms: 1

Other information
- Station code: HLL
- Classification: DfT category F2

Key dates
- 1 March 1911: Opened

Passengers
- 2021/22: ▲29,014
- 2022/23: ▲50,076
- 2023/24: ▲60,230
- 2024/25: ▼47,556
- 2025/26: ▲71,886
Location
Notes
- Passenger statistics from the Office of Rail and Road

Heath Low Level railway station is one of two railway stations serving Heath, Cardiff, Wales. The station is located on the Coryton Line 2 1/2 miles (4.0 km) north of Cardiff Central.

Heath Low Level was opened by the Cardiff Railway in 1911. When it was opened, it was called Heath Halt station. The station has one platform with a wheelchair accessible entrance from a minor residential road. On the platform is a brick built waiting shelter and open aired benches. The station is unstaffed.

Passenger services are provided by Transport for Wales as part of the Valley Lines network.

== Services ==
Monday to Saturday, there is a half-hourly service southbound to Cardiff Central and onwards to Penarth and to Coryton northbound. From the December 2025 timetable change, a Sunday service will be introduced.

Preceding station	National Rail	Following station
Ty Glas	Transport for Wales; Coryton Line	Cardiff Queen Street

== See also ==
- Heath High Level railway station
- List of railway stations in Cardiff
