= Rhiwbina railway station =

Railway station in Cardiff, Wales

Rhiwbina Welsh: Rhiwbeina
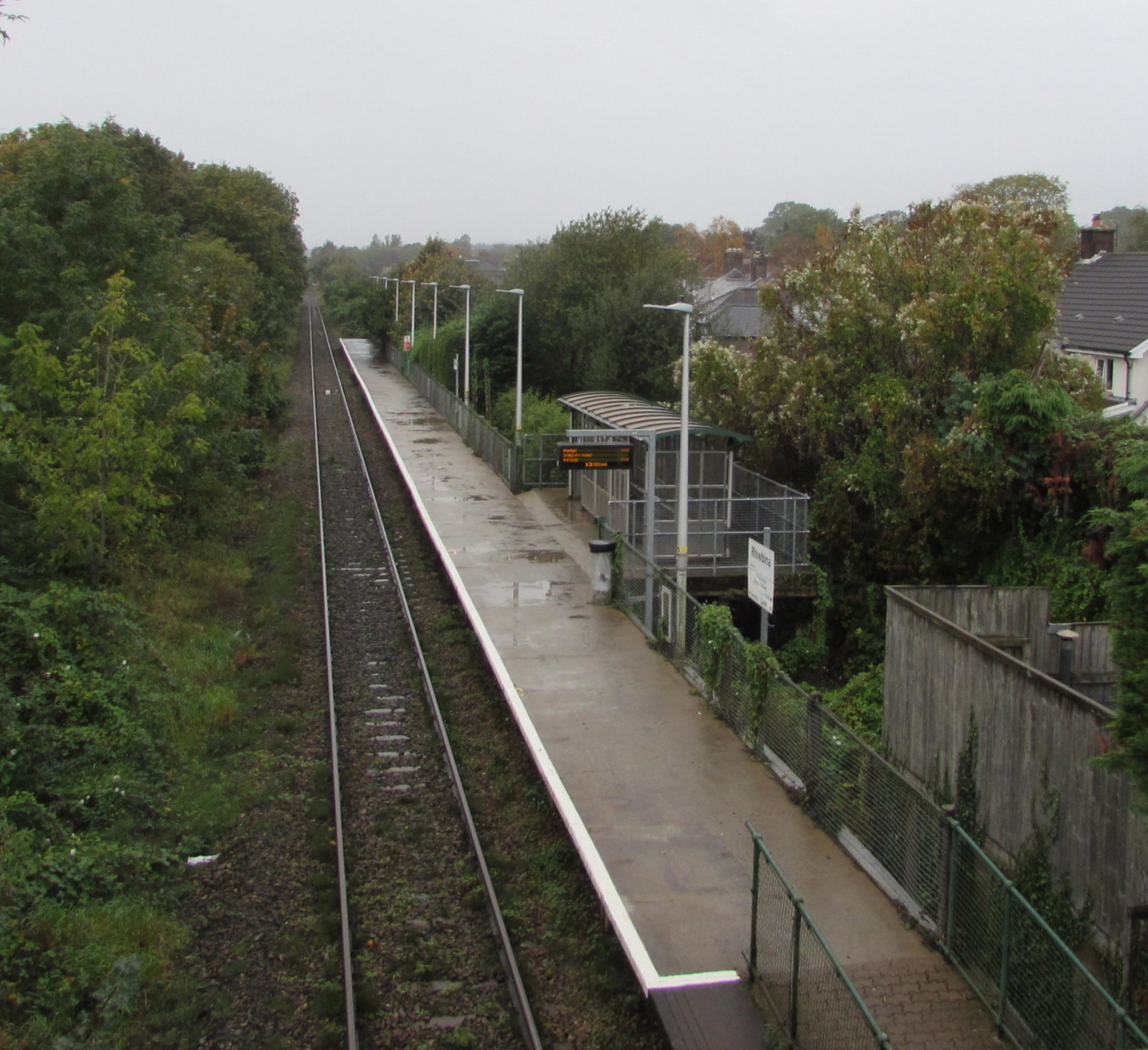

General information
- Location: Rhiwbina, Cardiff; Wales
- Coordinates: 51°31′16″N 3°12′50″W
- Grid reference: ST158809
- Manager: Transport for Wales
- Platforms: 1

Other information
- Station code: RHI
- Classification: DfT category F2

Key dates
- 1 March 1911: Opened

Passengers
- 2020/21: ▼10,512
- 2021/22: ▲33,392
- 2022/23: ▲60,080
- 2023/24: ▲78,982
- 2024/25: ▲81,840
Location
Notes
- Passenger statistics from the Office of Rail and Road

Rhiwbina railway station is a suburban railway station serving Rhiwbina, Cardiff, Wales. It is located on the Coryton Line 4.25 miles (6.84 km) north of Cardiff Central. Passenger services are provided by Transport for Wales as part of the Valley Lines network. The line is served by the Sprinter classes of DMUs, as well as the newly-introduced Class 756 tri-mode trains.

== History ==
It was opened by the Cardiff Railway in 1911, and was a two-track, dual platform station. Services have previously included a service from Coryton to Cardiff Bay.

Improvements to the Coryton Line are scheduled to occur from 2020 onwards, with Rhiwbina potentially becoming a part-electrified two-track station with two platforms, in mid-2021, under new proposals made by the South Wales Metro Scheme.

In March 2025, the BBC included the station in a list of "Britain's 10 worst performing stations by percentage of cancelled trains".

== Facilities ==
The station, previously a halt, has a small shelter and a card-only ticket machine. It is accessible from the Rhiwbina Garden Village side, behind the library, as well as from Caedelyn Park via a newly renovated footbridge.

== Services ==
Monday to Saturday, there is a half-hourly service southbound to Cardiff Central and onwards to Penarth and to Coryton northbound. There are currently no services on Sundays, but is set to begin as an hourly service in December 2025.

Preceding station	National Rail	Following station
Birchgrove	Transport for Wales; Coryton Line	Whitchurch

== See also ==
- List of railway stations in Cardiff
