= Whitchurch railway station (Wales) =

Railway station in Cardiff, Wales

Whitchurch (Cardiff) Welsh: Yr Eglwys Newydd
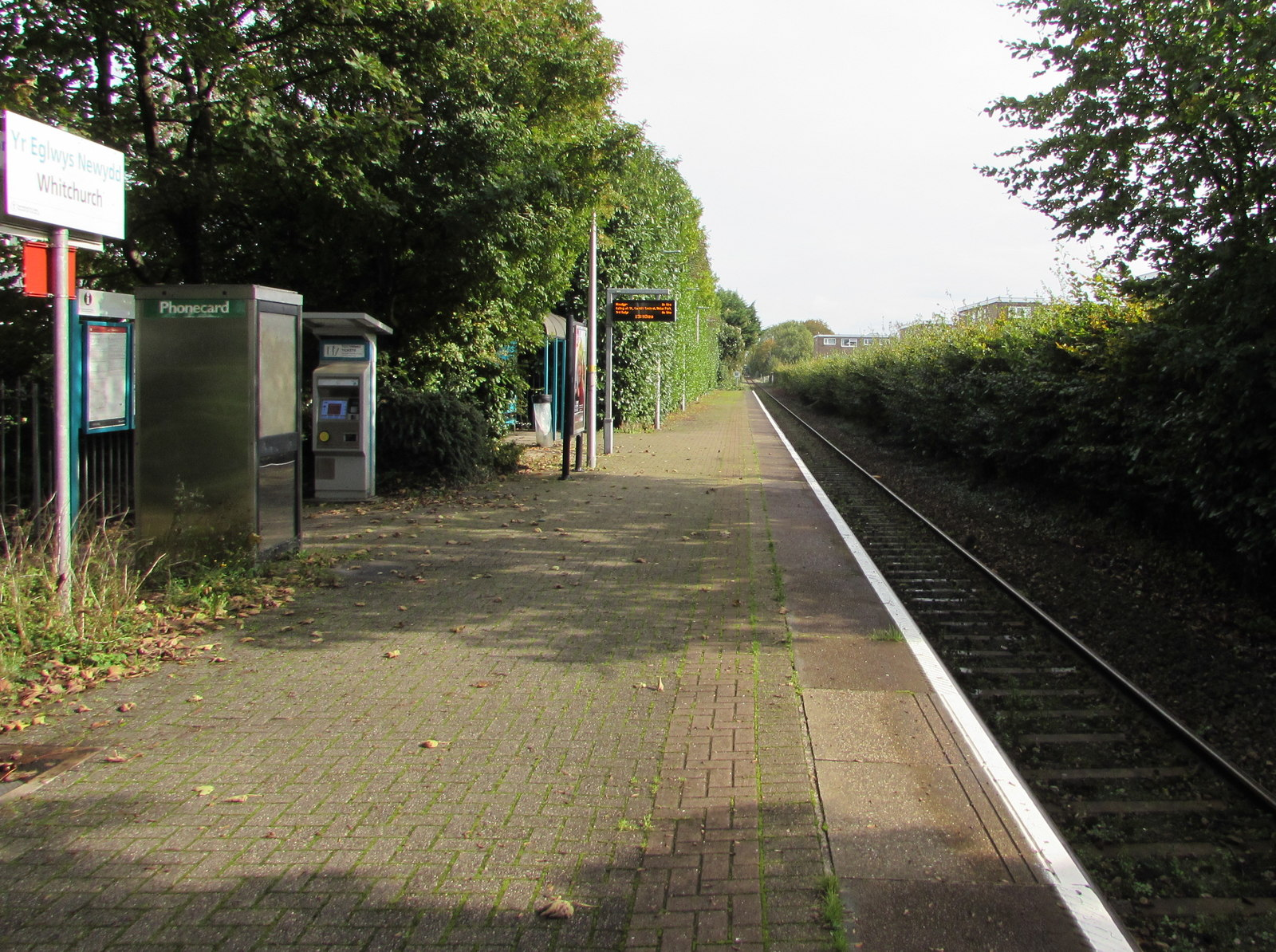
- View east, towards Cardiff (2019)

General information
- Location: Whitchurch, Cardiff, Cardiff; Wales
- Coordinates: 51.5208°N 3.2222°W
- Grid reference: ST153809
- Manager: Transport for Wales
- Platforms: 1

Other information
- Station code: WHT
- Classification: DfT category F2

History
- Original company: Cardiff Railway
- Pre-grouping: Cardiff Railway
- Post-grouping: Great Western Railway

Key dates
- 1 March 1911: Opened as Whitchurch
- 1 July 1924: Renamed Whitchurch (Glam)
- 5 May 1975: Renamed Whitchurch (South Glam)
- ?: Renamed Whitchurch (Cardiff)

Passengers
- 2021/22: ▲9,310
- 2022/23: ▲18,188
- 2023/24: ▲24,954
- 2024/25: ▼22,818
- 2025/26: ▲29,820
Location
Notes
- Passenger statistics from the Office of Rail and Road

Whitchurch railway station is a railway station serving Whitchurch, Cardiff, Wales. It is located on the Coryton Line 4.5 miles (7.2 km) north of Cardiff Central and is situated beneath the A470 road.

Passenger services are provided by Transport for Wales as part of the Valley Lines network.

== History ==
It was opened by the Cardiff Railway in 1911. Until the 1960s Whitchurch station had 2 platforms (up and down lines) plus a goods platform, a goods shed and yard, booking office, footbridge, and a staff of at least 2 including George the porter. There was also a signal box at the eastern end of the platform

In March 2025, the BBC included the station in a list of "Britain's 10 worst performing stations by percentage of cancelled trains".

== Service ==
Monday to Saturday, there is a half-hourly service southbound to Cardiff Central and onwards to Penarth and to Coryton northbound with a service running in the nights Coryton-Bridgend via Vale of Glamorgan. A Sunday service was introduced for the first time in December 2025.

Preceding station	National Rail	Following station
Rhiwbina	Transport for Wales; Coryton Line	Coryton

== See also ==
- List of railway stations in Cardiff
