= Heath High Level railway station =

Railway station in Cardiff, Wales

Heath High Level Welsh: Lefel Uchel y Mynydd Bychan
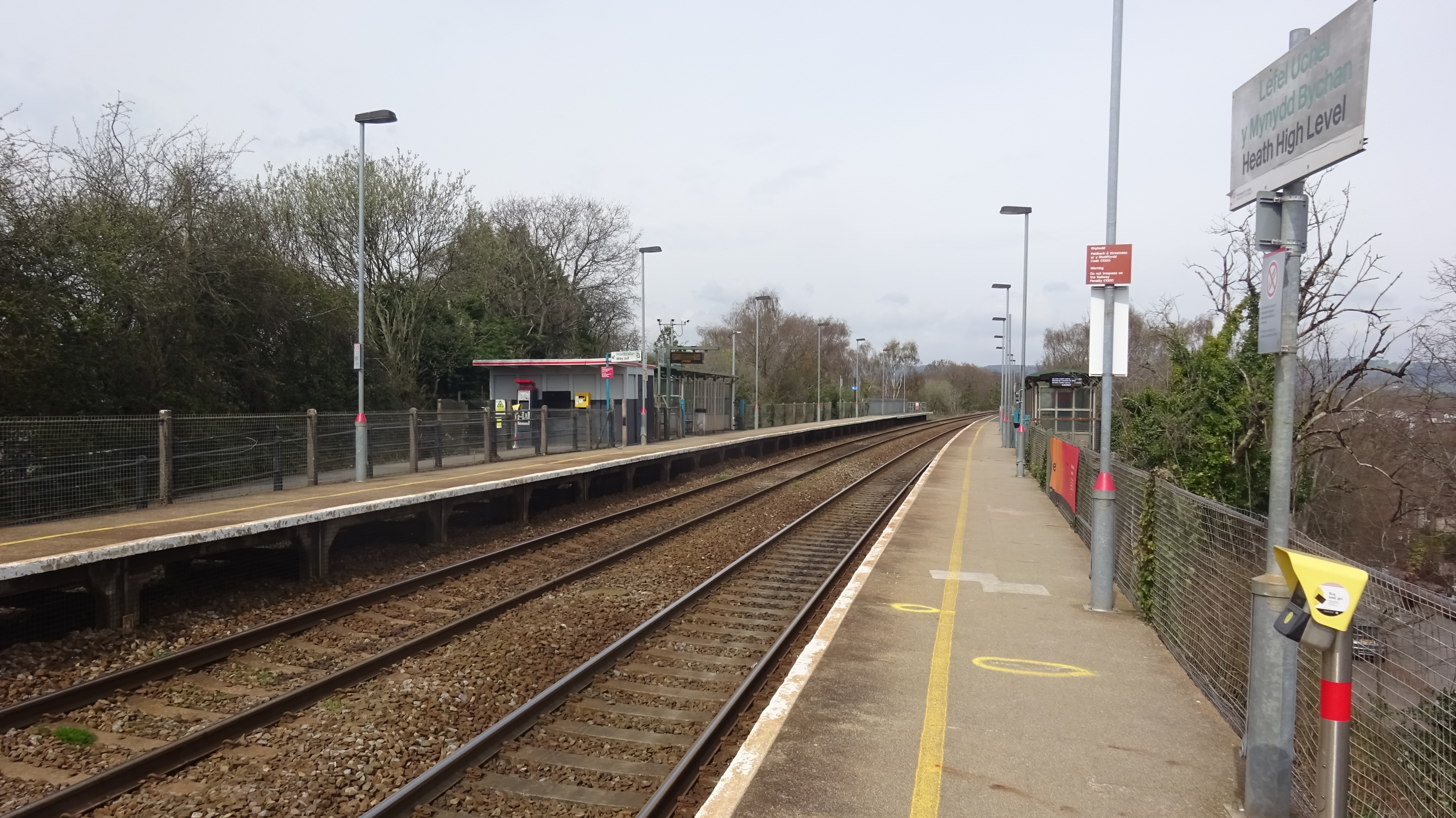

General information
- Location: Heath, Cardiff; Wales
- Coordinates: 51°31′00″N 3°10′54″W
- Grid reference: ST181804
- Managed by: Transport for Wales
- Platforms: 2

Other information
- Station code: HHL
- Classification: DfT category F2

Key dates
- 1915: Opened

Passengers
- 2020/21: ▼75,870
- 2021/22: ▲0.222 million
- 2022/23: ▲0.281 million
- 2023/24: ▲0.341 million
- 2024/25: ▲0.425 million
Location
Notes
- Passenger statistics from the Office of Rail and Road

Heath High Level railway station is one of two railway stations serving Heath, Cardiff, Wales. The station is located on the Rhymney Line. Passenger services are provided by Transport for Wales as part of the Valley Lines network.

It was opened by the Rhymney Railway in 1915. The Low Level station is located on the Coryton Line.

== Services ==
The Monday to Saturday daytime service pattern is six trains an hour southbound to Cardiff Central: two continue to Penarth, three to Barry Island and one to Bridgend. Northbound six trains an hour run to Caerphilly, with four continuing to Bargoed and two of those going on to Rhymney. The frequency decreases in the evening.

On Sundays, the service pattern is two trains an hour southbound to Cardiff Central and Barry Island, and two an hour northbound to Caerphilly, with one continuing to Rhymney.

Preceding station	National Rail	Following station
Cardiff Queen Street	Transport for Wales; Rhymney Line	Llanishen

== See also ==
- Heath Low Level railway station
- List of railway stations in Cardiff
