= Heath, Cardiff =

District and community in Cardiff, Wales

Coordinates: 51.511°N 3.199°W

Heath
- Community
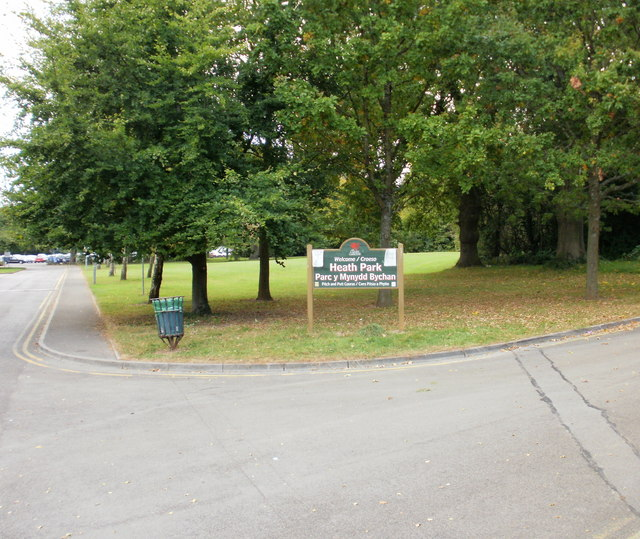
- Entrance to Heath Park

- Location within Cardiff
- Principal area: Cardiff
- Country: Wales
- Sovereign state: United Kingdom
- Police: South Wales
- Fire: South Wales
- Ambulance: Welsh
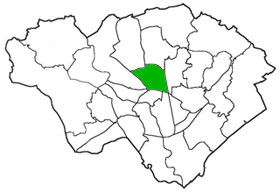
- List of places UK Wales Cardiff

Heath (Welsh: Y Mynydd Bychan) is a district, community and coterminous electoral ward in the north of Cardiff, capital of Wales. It is a predominantly affluent area with property prices being the third highest in the city. The area is known for its traditional 1930s detached and semi-detached properties with large south facing gardens. Roads are tree lined and large greeneries with the notable attraction of Heath Park and the joining of the University Hospital of Wales.

The population of the ward and community taken at the 2011 census was 12,629.

== Description ==
Heath was originally called the Great Heath and named as a result of the large park and woodland that it once contained. After the initial development of traditionally middle-classed semi-detached housing (1920s-1950s) and more recently the construction of the University Hospital of Wales on the site of the former Heath Wood (1960s), much of the greenery has been eradicated. It should be distinguished from the Little Heath (Welsh: Y Waun Ddyfal) which lies to the south of the Great Heath, in the vicinity of Crwys Road.

The 91 acre, (37 hectare) Heath Park forms the remainder of this area of grass and woodland. It includes attractions and facilities such as the George V Playing Fields, tennis courts, a miniature steam railway and refreshment facilities.

Birchgrove is a busy shopping area that is part of the ward of Heath. It is composed mostly of more affordably priced housing, mainly terraced, and has taken on an identity of its own.

The area around the University Hospital of Wales has been known as Saints Corner, due to the number of streets in the area named after well known saints.

== The Welsh language ==
The number of Heath residents over three years old who speak Welsh increased from 1,378 in the 2001 UK Census to 1,422 in the 2011 UK Census. In percentage terms there was a slight decrease (from 12.1% to 11.7%). This was caused by a reduction in the number of speakers over the age of 65; the age groups 3–15 and 16—64 both showed increases.

== Transport ==
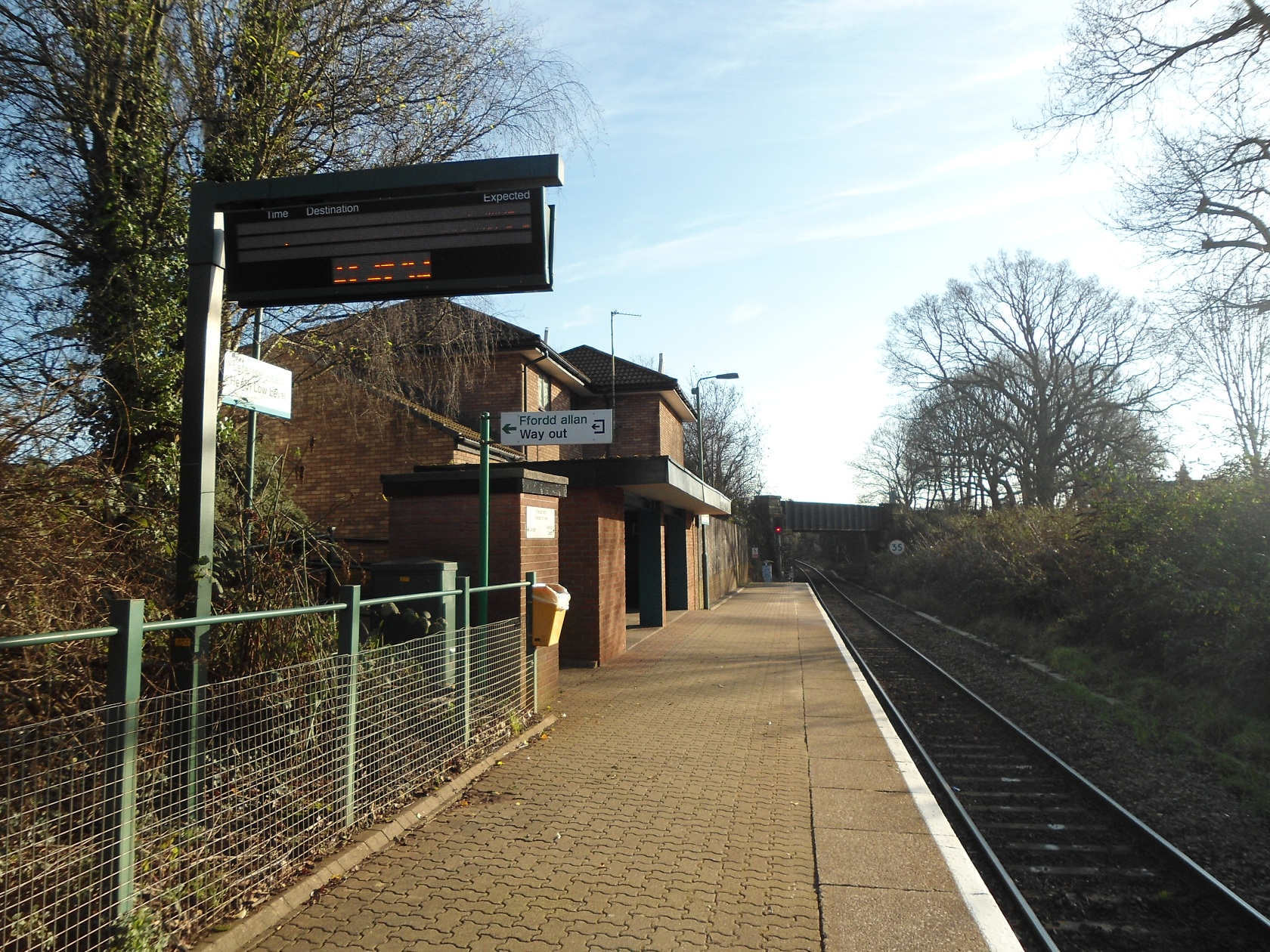
Heath Low Level station

=== Rail ===
The area is served by two railway stations. Heath Low Level is on the Coryton Line, linking Central and Coryton stations. Heath High Level is on the Rhymney Line, linking Central and Rhymney stations via Llanishen, Lisvane Thornhill and Caerphilly.

=== Bus ===
Cardiff Bus's routes 38 and 39 terminate at the University Hospital of Wales, originating from the City Centre. The 8 now operates between the City Centre and Grangetown, while the 9/9A operates from the City Centre to IKEA and Cardiff Bay, including the Sports Village. The 86 service runs to Lisvane via Heath. The following services run through west of Heath:

- 1/2 (City Circle)
- 21 (Central Stn)
- 23 (Whitchurch/Rhiwbina)
- 24 (Whitchurch/Llandaff/Canton)
- 25 (Central Stn)
- 27 Capital City Green (Thornhill/Birchgrove)
- 35 (Gabalfa or Cardiff Bay)

=== Walking and cycling ===
Cardiff Council have recently implemented a number of traffic calming measures on Allensbank Road / Heath Park Avenue with the aim of slowing traffic on the major thoroughfare and improving safety for pedestrians. The council also has plans for Cycleway 1 to run through the area, continuing on from Gabalfa to the neighbouring ward of Cyncoed.

== Governance ==
Westminster: As part of Cardiff North, Heath has been represented at Westminster since 2017 by Anna McMorrin MP (Welsh Labour)

Senedd: As part of Cardiff North, Heath has been represented in the Senedd since 2011 by Julie Morgan, MS (Labour)

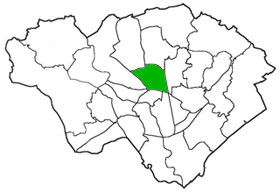
Location of Heath electoral ward in Cardiff

Heath is both an electoral ward, and a community of the City of Cardiff. There is no community council for the area.

The electoral ward of Heath falls within the parliamentary constituency of Cardiff North. It is bounded by Rhiwbina and Llanishen to the north; Cyncoed to the east; Gabalfa and Cathays to the south; Llandaff North to the southwest; and Whitchurch & Tongwynlais to the west.

Cardiff Council: Since May 2017 Heath is represented on Cardiff Council by three councillors, Lyn Hudson (Conservative), Graham Hinchey (Welsh Labour) and Fenella Bowden (Heath & Birchgrove Independents). Cllr Bowden had been a member of the Liberal Democrats but left, to sit as an Independent councillor, in November 2010. In the past it has been represented by a variety of political groups, moving from Labour in the 1990s, to all Liberal Democrat in May 2004 and, after the May 2008 election, a Conservative majority.
