= Birchgrove railway station =

Railway station in Cardiff, Wales

Birchgrove Welsh: Llwynbedw

General information
- Location: Birchgrove, Cardiff; Wales
- Coordinates: 51.5213°N 3.2027°W
- Grid reference: ST166809
- Manager: Transport for Wales
- Platforms: 1

Other information
- Station code: BCG
- Classification: DfT category F2

History
- Original company: Great Western Railway

Key dates
- 10 June 1929: Opened as Birchgrove Halt
- 5 May 1969: Renamed Birchgrove

Passengers
- 2021/22: ▲17,072
- 2022/23: ▲33,378
- 2023/24: ▲49,066
- 2024/25: ▲53,024
- 2025/26: ▲0.117 million
Location
Notes
- Passenger statistics from the Office of Rail and Road

Birchgrove railway station is a railway station serving Birchgrove, Cardiff, Wales. It is located on the Coryton Line 3.75 miles (6.04 km) north of Cardiff Central, with the station situated beneath the A469.

Passenger services are provided by Transport for Wales as part of the Valley Lines network.

It was opened by the Great Western Railway in 1929.

In March 2025, the BBC included the station in a list of "Britain's 10 worst performing stations by percentage of cancelled trains".

== Services ==
Monday to Saturday, there is a half-hourly service southbound to Cardiff Central and onwards to Penarth and to Coryton northbound. As of December 2025, there is now an hourly service.

Preceding station	National Rail	Following station
Ty Glas	Transport for Wales; Coryton Line	Rhiwbina

== See also ==
- List of railway stations in Cardiff

== Sources ==
- Butt, R. V. J. (October 1995). The Directory of Railway Stations: details every public and private passenger station, halt, platform and stopping place, past and present (1st ed.). Sparkford: Patrick Stephens Ltd. ISBN 978-1-85260-508-7. OCLC 60251199. OL 11956311M.
