= Dingle Road railway station =

Railway station in the Vale of Glamorgan, Wales

Dingle Road Welsh: Heol Dingle
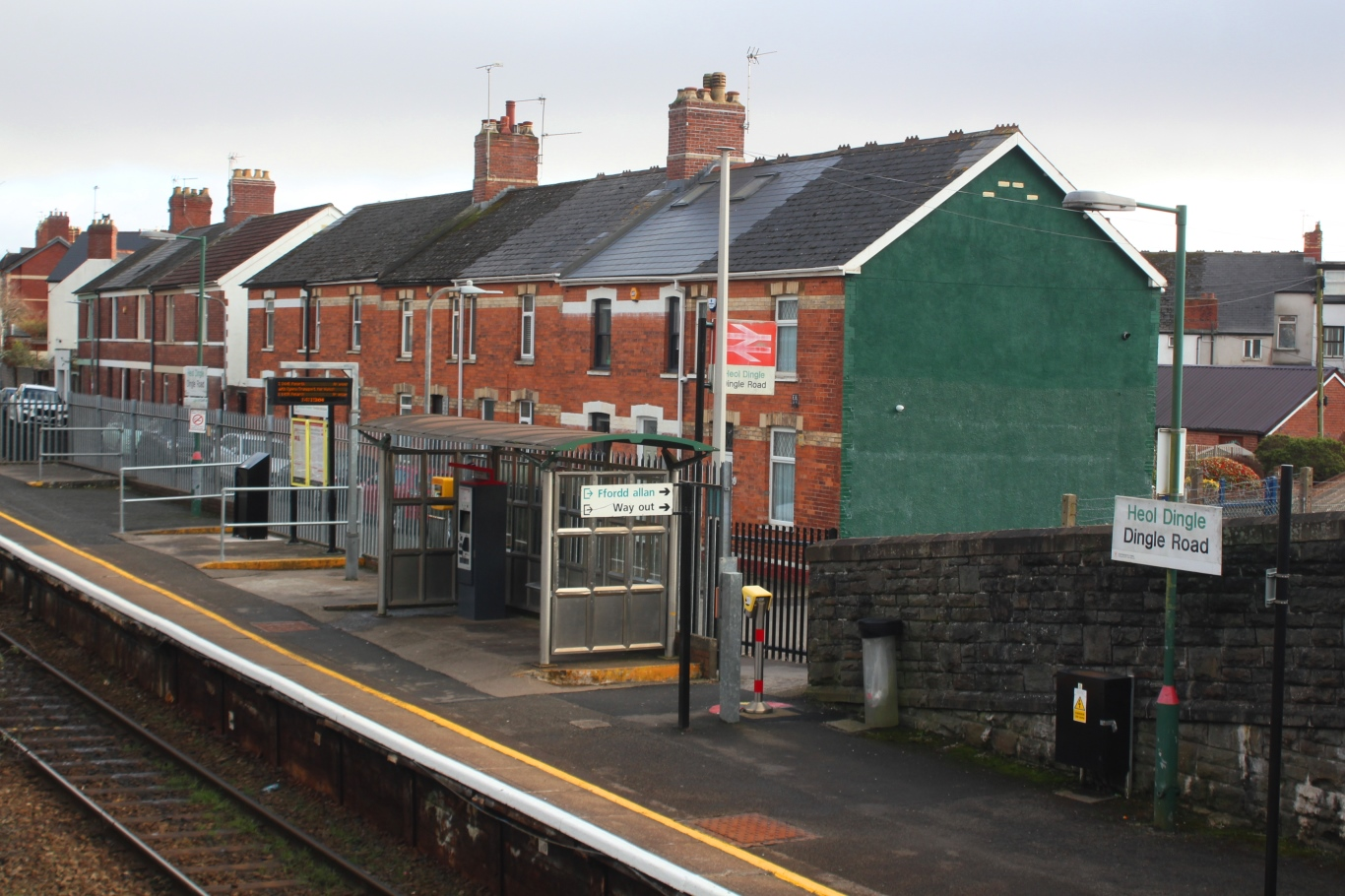

General information
- Location: Penarth, Vale of Glamorgan; Wales
- Coordinates: 51°26′24″N 3°10′48″W
- Grid reference: ST180718
- Managed by: Transport for Wales
- Platforms: 1

Other information
- Station code: DGL
- Classification: DfT category F2

History
- Original company: Taff Vale Railway
- Post-grouping: Great Western Railway

Key dates
- 1 March 1904: opened
- 1967: Down platform closed
- 1984: buildings on remaining platform replaced

Passengers
- 2020/21: ▼20,174
- 2021/22: ▲83,682
- 2022/23: ▲0.117 million
- 2023/24: ▲0.142 million
- 2024/25: ▲0.162 million
Location
Notes
- Passenger statistics from the Office of Rail and Road

Dingle Road railway station is a railway station in the town of Penarth in the Vale of Glamorgan, South Wales. It is on the Penarth branch of the Vale of Glamorgan Line 3 miles (5 km) south of Cardiff Central on the way to Penarth.

All passenger trains serving this station are operated by Transport for Wales as part of the Valley Lines network.

== History ==
The Taff Vale Railway opened the station in 1904. It had two platforms until 1967, when British Rail closed the Down platform and reduced the line from double to single track.

== Service ==
During Monday to Saturday daytimes, there are four trains per hour to Cardiff Central. Before timetable changes on the 2nd June, they then travelled beyond to Bargoed, and hourly through to Rhymney northbound and Penarth southbound. Following these changes, however, trains now run to Caerphilly and Coryton, flipping between destinations with each train. On Monday to Saturday evenings, there are two trains per hour.

Before the May 2024 timetable alterations, on Sundays there was only one train every two hours (to Penarth & Cardiff Central only) and no late evening service. After these changes, services now run once an hour, terminating at Cardiff Queen Street, running between 10am and 10pm.

Preceding station	National Rail	Following station
Grangetown	Transport for Wales; Vale of Glamorgan Line	Penarth
