= Llanishen railway station =

Railway station in Cardiff, Wales

Llanishen Welsh: Llanisien
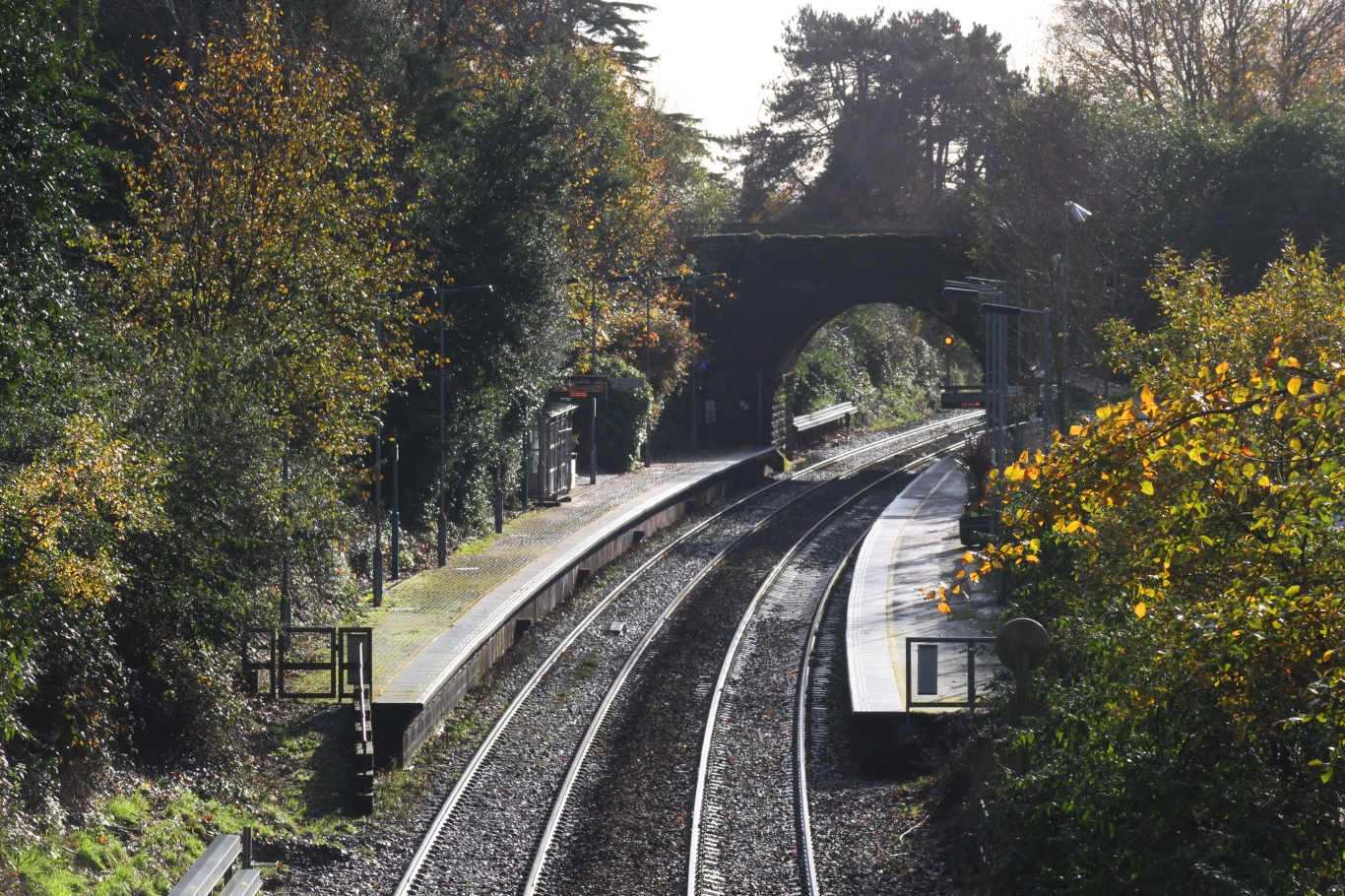

General information
- Location: Llanishen, Cardiff; Wales
- Coordinates: 51°31′58″N 3°10′54″W
- Grid reference: ST181821
- Managed by: Transport for Wales
- Platforms: 2

Other information
- Station code: LLS
- Classification: DfT category F2

History
- Opened: 1871

Passengers
- 2020/21: ▼29,902
- 2021/22: ▲0.106 million
- 2022/23: ▲0.151 million
- 2023/24: ▲0.188 million
- 2024/25: ▲0.226 million
Location
Notes
- Passenger statistics from the Office of Rail and Road

Llanishen railway station (Welsh: Llanisien) is a railway station serving the area of Llanishen in Cardiff, south Wales. It is a stop on the Rhymney Line of the Valley Lines network.

== Services ==
The Monday to Saturday daytime service pattern is six trains an hour southbound to Cardiff Central: two continue to Penarth, three to Barry Island and one to Bridgend. Northbound six trains an hour run to Caerphilly, with four continuing to Bargoed and two of those going on to Rhymney. The frequency decreases in the evening.

On Sundays, the service pattern is two trains an hour southbound to Cardiff Central and Barry Island, and two an hour northbound to Caerphilly, with one continuing to Rhymney.

Preceding station	National Rail	Following station
Heath High Level	Transport for Wales; Rhymney Line	Lisvane and Thornhill

== See also ==
- List of railway stations in Cardiff
