= Coryton railway station =

Railway station in Cardiff, Wales

Coryton
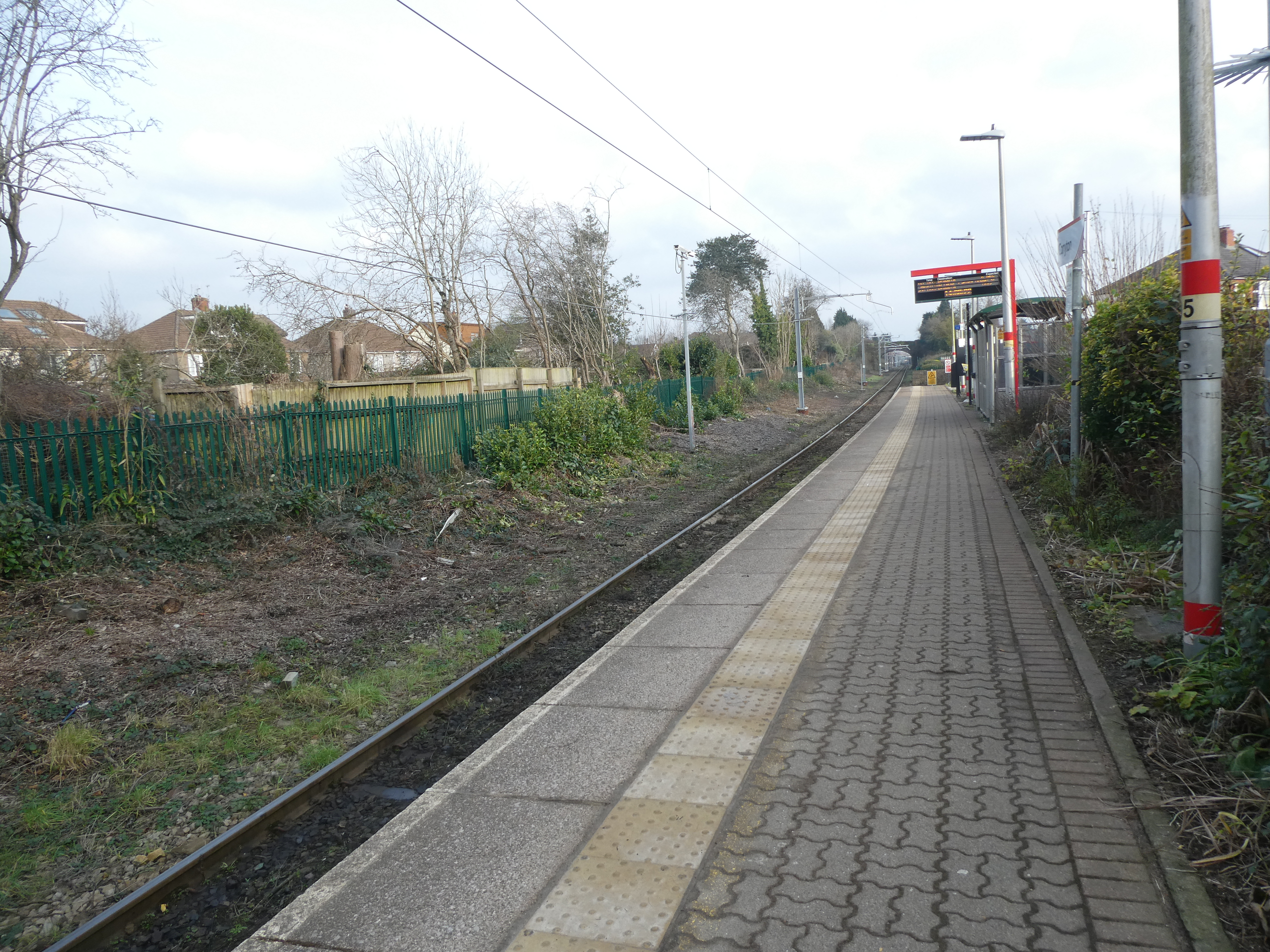

General information
- Location: Coryton, Cardiff; Wales
- Coordinates: 51.5204°N 3.2319°W
- Grid reference: ST146808
- Managed by: Transport for Wales
- Platforms: 1

Other information
- Station code: COY
- Classification: DfT category F1

History
- Original company: Cardiff Railway
- Pre-grouping: Cardiff Railway
- Post-grouping: Great Western Railway

Key dates
- 1 March 1911: Opened as Coryton Halt
- 1926: Renamed Coryton Halt (Glam)
- 1931: Relocated
- 5 May 1969: Renamed Coryton

Passengers
- 2020/21: ▼13,220
- 2021/22: ▲35,126
- 2022/23: ▲53,884
- 2023/24: ▲68,146
- 2024/25: ▲76,514
Location
Notes
- Passenger statistics from the Office of Rail and Road

Coryton railway station serves Coryton and Pantmawr in Cardiff, Wales. It is the terminus of the Coryton Line 5 miles (8.0 km) north of Cardiff Central via Cardiff Queen Street.

Passenger services are provided by Transport for Wales as part of the Valley Lines network.

== History ==
The station was opened by the Cardiff Railway on 1 March 1911 as Coryton Halt; it was renamed Coryton Halt (Glam) by the Great Western Railway in 1926, and relocated in 1931. The line beyond here closed to all traffic in 1952. It was proposed for closure in the Beeching Report of 1963, but survived. The station was renamed Coryton on 5 May 1969.

== Facilities ==
There is one platform with a single bus-stop style shelter and benches. The station has two entrances, one wheelchair accessible from Park Crescent and one down a flight of steps from the A4054 road bridge over the track.

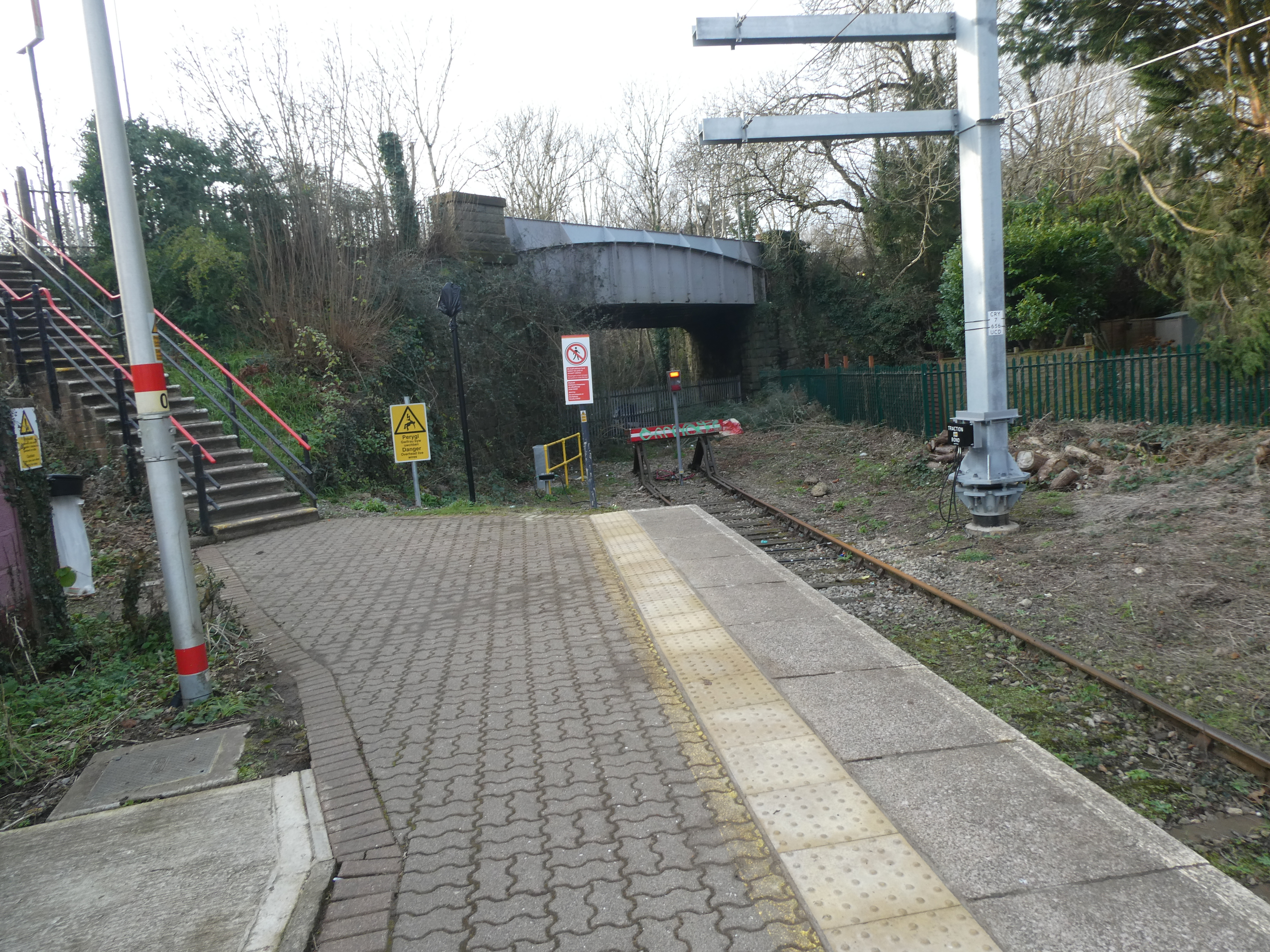
Coyrton has an rare OLE terminating layout with the OLE mast being on the side rather than behind the buffers

== Services ==
Monday to Saturdays there is a half-hourly service to Penarth, calling at Whitchurch, Rhiwbina, Birchgrove, Ty Glas, Heath Low Level, Cardiff Queen Street, Cardiff Central, Grangetown, Dingle Road, and Penarth. There is also a nightly service that runs from Coryton to Bridgend. A Sunday service was introduced for the first time in December 2025.

Preceding station	National Rail	Following station
Whitchurch	Transport for Wales; Coryton Line	Terminus

== See also ==
- List of railway stations in Cardiff
- Rail transport in Cardiff
