= Birchgrove, Cardiff =

District of Cardiff, Wales

Coordinates: 51.517778°N 3.201389°W

Birchgrove
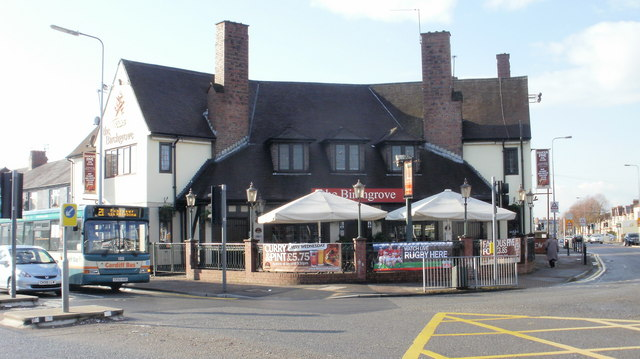
- The Birchgrove

- Location within Cardiff
- Population
- Principal area: Cardiff
- Preserved county: Cardiff
- Country: Wales
- Sovereign state: United Kingdom
- Post town: CARDIFF
- Postcode district: CF14
- Dialling code: 029
- Police: South Wales
- Fire: South Wales
- Ambulance: Welsh
- UK Parliament: Cardiff North
- Senedd Cymru – Welsh Parliament: Cardiff North

Birchgrove (Welsh: Llwynfedw) is a district of the city of Cardiff stretching between Llanishen and the Gabalfa interchange, along the A469 Caerphilly road.

It centres on a crossroads dominated by the Birchgrove pub which also lies between Heath and Whitchurch. Heath Park and University Hospital of Wales adjoin.

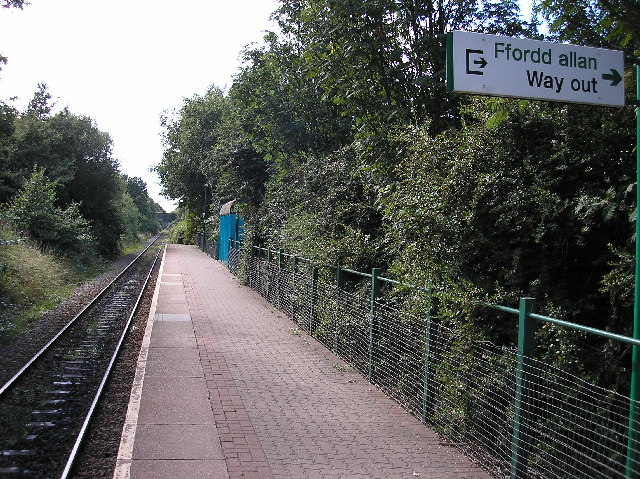
Birchgrove Station on the Coryton Line is served by Transport for Wales

It differentiates from the ward of Heath in which it lies, by being a busy, hustle and bustle type of area, with rows of small shops and eateries and for the most part being dominated by terraced housing.

There is a school in the area called Birchgrove Primary School. There are approximately 420 children attending that school. Opposite the school is a post office.

The area is served by Birchgrove railway station on the Coryton Line, and by the Capital City Green bus service.

== Notable people ==
- Colin Jackson (1967-) Former hurdler and presenter, grew up on Cromwell Road in Birchgrove, attending Birchgrove Primary School.
- Geraint Thomas, Winner of the Tour de France 2018. Grew up on Coronation Road in Birchgrove.
