= Coryton, Cardiff =

District of Cardiff, Wales

Coordinates: 51°31′24″N 3°14′01″W

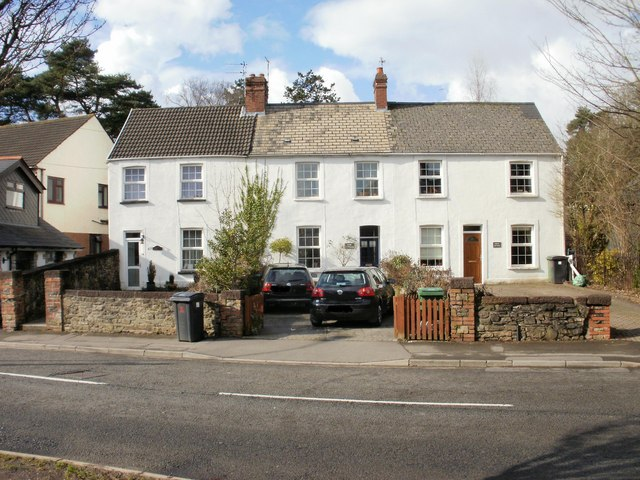
Pantmawr Road, Coryton

Coryton is a district of Cardiff, the capital city of Wales, lying immediately to the north of Whitchurch next to junction 32 of the M4 motorway. It is within the Whitchurch & Tongwynlais electoral ward.

== Coryton House ==
Coryton House is a large Edwardian house built in 1900 for the shipowner and dry-dock owner John Cory (1855–1931), the founder of the shipping company John Cory and Sons and the father of the politician Sir Herbert Cory, 1st Baronet (1857–1933), who also lived in Coryton House. The gardens of Coryton House were expanded in the interwar period and are listed as Grade II on the Cadw/ICOMOS Register of Parks and Gardens of Special Historic Interest in Wales. After Sir Herbert's death in 1933 the house became the civil defence headquarters for Cardiff. Offices were built on the part of the garden between the house and Pendwyallt Road, now replaced by housing, and the Village Hotel was built on the kitchen gardens. Coryton House is now Ty Coryton, a special school specialising in children with autism.

== Coryton today ==
The district contains a mix of early and mid-20th century suburban housing estates, 1960s council housing and some post-2000 developments.

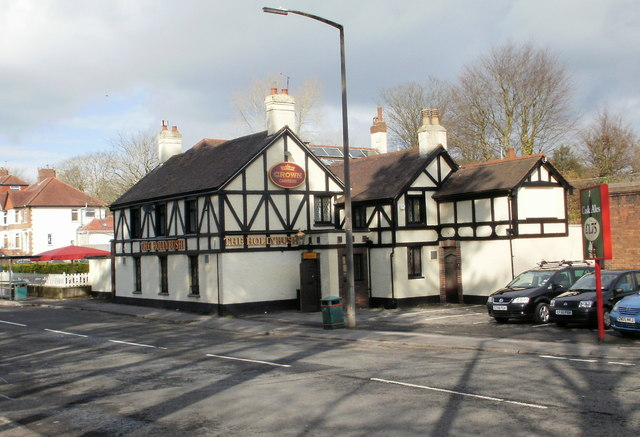
The Hollybush pub, Coryton

Due to the area's close proximity to Whitchurch, it has few amenities of its own. To visitors, it is probably best known for The Hollybush public house, the Village Hotel at the M4 motorway junction, and the biggest Asda supermarket in South Wales.

The Glamorganshire Canal local nature reserve, a country park, is adjacent to the River Taff.

The area is served by Coryton railway station, the terminus of the Coryton Line.

Inter Coryton football club plays its home games in nearby Caedelyn Park.
