= Coryton Line =

Urban rail line in Cardiff, Wales

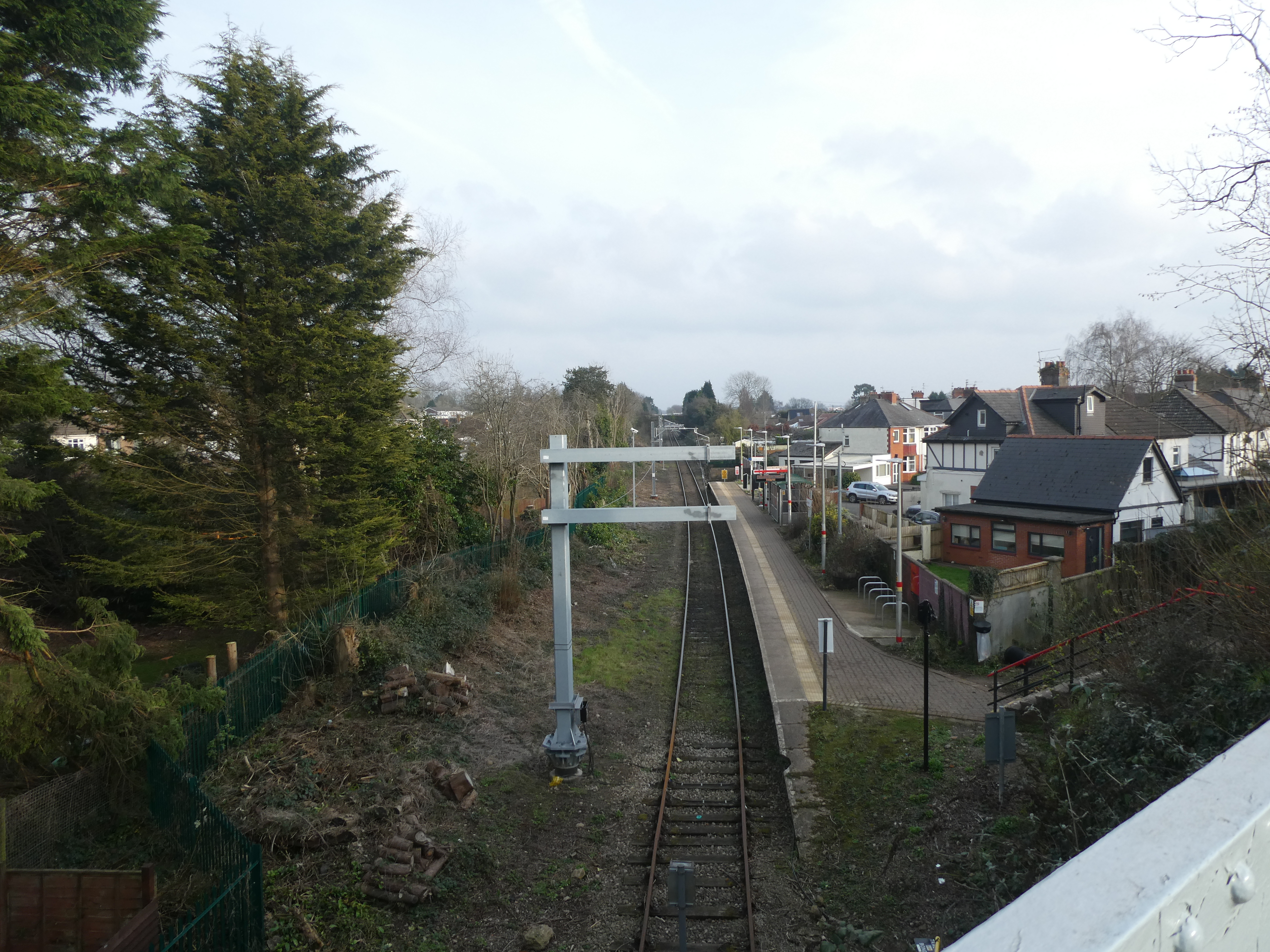
- The terminus of the Coryton Line at Coryton railway station

Overview
- Owner: Transport for Wales
- Locale: Cardiff
- Termini: Cardiff Central railway station; Coryton railway station
- Stations: 8

Service
- Type: Urban rail
- System: National Rail
- Operator: Transport for Wales Rail
- Rolling stock: Class 150 DMUs; Class 153 DMUs

Technical
- Line length: 5 miles 37 chains (8.8 km)
- Num of tracks: Single track covering 6 stations
- Track gauge: 4 ft 8 1/2 in (1,435 mm) standard gauge
- Electrification: 25 kV 50 hz AC OLE (Discontinuous)
Route map
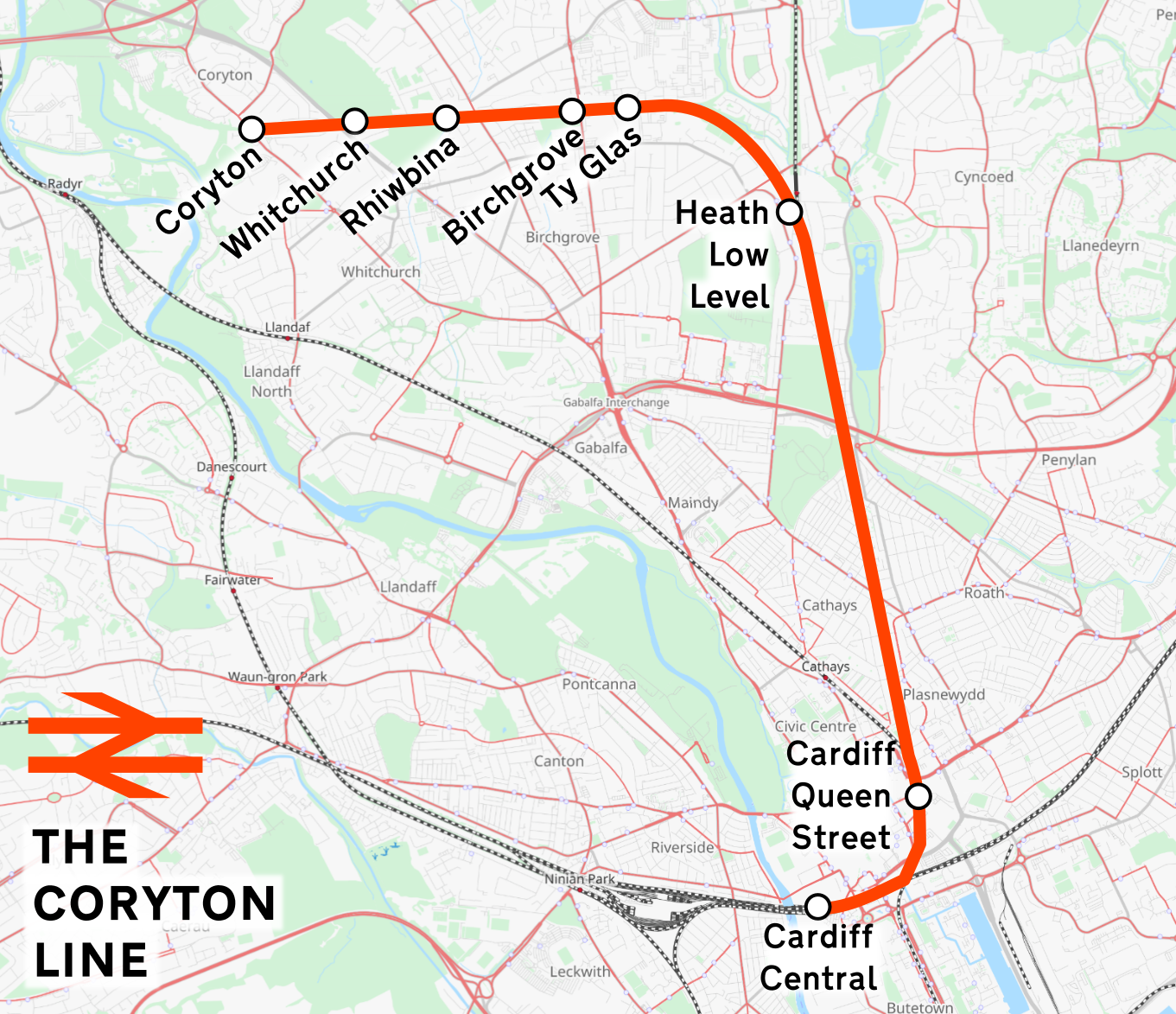
(Click to expand)

The Coryton Line is an urban rail line in Cardiff that starts from the city centre to Heath, Birchgrove, Rhiwbina, Whitchurch and Coryton. It was originally opened as part of the main line of the Cardiff Railway.

The line is operated by Transport for Wales as part of the Valley Lines network. TfW replaced the previous franchise, Arriva Trains Wales in October 2018. Rolling stock seen operating the line was normally class 153s, or class 150s.

Services normally continue to Penarth.

== Electrification of the Line ==
On 16 July 2012, plans to electrify the line were announced by the Government as part of a £9.4bn package of investment in the railways in England and Wales.

The announcement was made as an extension of the electrification of the South Wales Main Line from Cardiff to Swansea and the electrification of the south Wales Valley Lines at a total cost of £350 million. The investment will require new trains and should result in reduced journey times and cheaper maintenance of the network. Work was expected to start between the years 2014 and 2019, but was then pushed back to between 2019 and 2024.

As part of Welsh Government's South Wales Metro this line has been taken over, and has been electrified in preparation for new Class 756 rolling stock.

== See also ==
- List of railway stations in Cardiff
