= Cardiff Railway =

Railway company in Wales

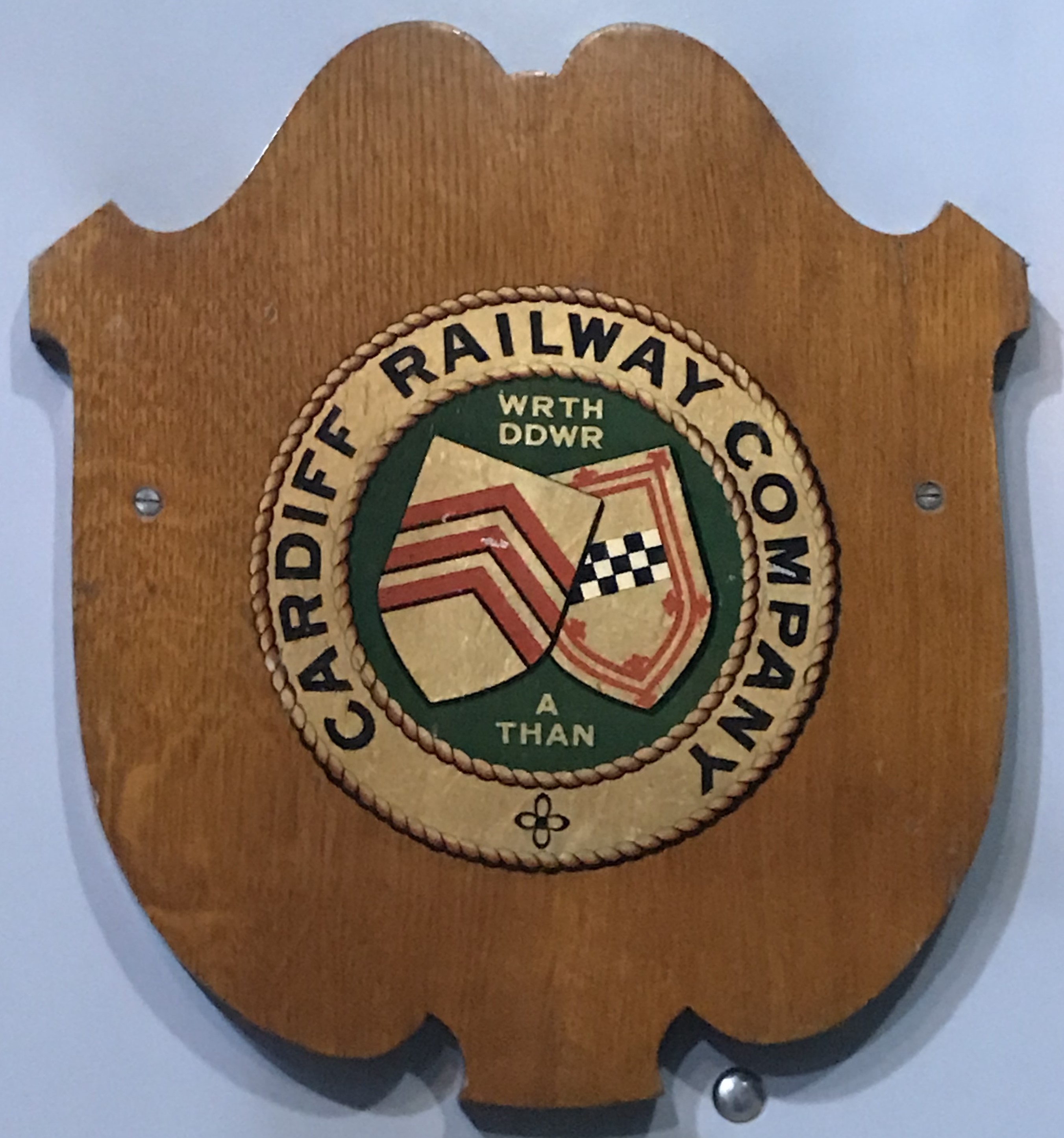
Wrth Ddŵr a Thân: By Fire and Water, the company's motto. Plaque in the National Railway Museum, York, England

From 1839, the trustees of the Marquis of Bute, operated a large dock operation in Cardiff, the "Bute Docks". This was very successful, but was overwhelmed by the huge volume of coal exported through Cardiff. At the same time, it was seen that railway companies, especially the Taff Vale Railway (TVR), were making money conveying the coal to the docks.

The Bute Docks company decided to build a railway from Pontypridd to their dock; they obtained an act of Parliament, the Cardiff Railway Act 1897, giving authority for part of the route, and changing the company name to the Cardiff Railway. To be successful, they needed to make a junction with their main rival, the TVR, at Treforest. A single mineral train traversed the junction in 1909 but legal challenges prevented any further use. The Cardiff Railway had built an expensive railway line that failed to connect with the collieries beyond Pontypridd. The company became part of the Great Western Railway (as did the TVR) in 1923.

A low-key passenger service was operated, and a colliery at Nantgarw was served until 1952. The passenger service was cut back to Coryton in 1931 and continues to operate today.

== Bute Docks ==
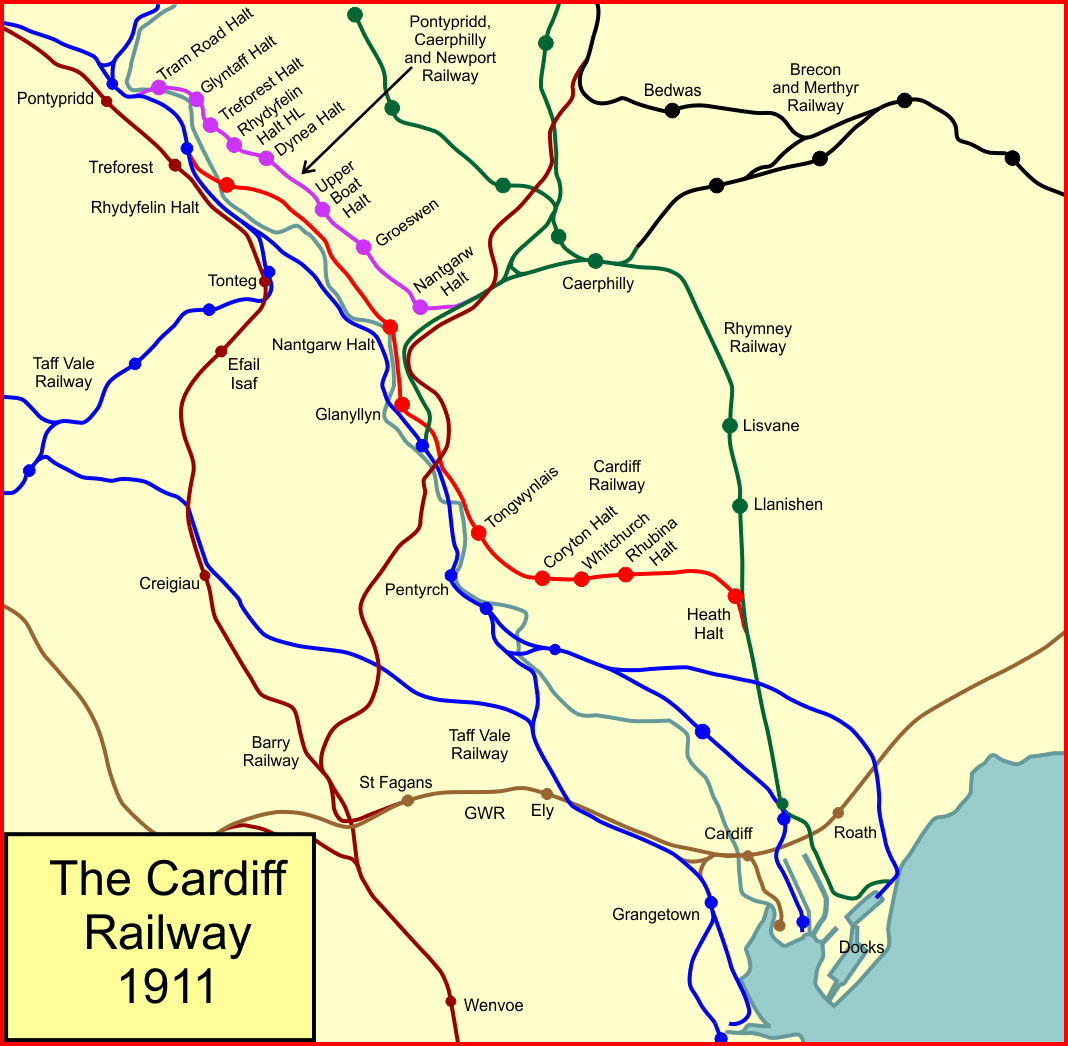
System map of the Cardiff Railway in 1911

Already in the 18th century, it was obvious that some improved means was needed to convey coal mined in the South Wales Valleys to wharves on the Bristol Channel. For many of the pits, Cardiff was the nearest and most convenient location, and in 1790, the Glamorganshire Canal opened from Navigation House (Abercynon) to Cardiff.

This represented huge progress, but the canal had 49 locks and did not directly reach the majority of the mineral sites. As iron smelting developed on an industrial scale, the demands of that industry too soon outstripped the transport facilities available.

The first large dock opened in Cardiff on 9 October 1839; it was named the Bute Dock after Lord Bute who was the principal owner. From 8 October 1840 the Taff Vale Railway opened, in stages, from Merthyr to the Bute Dock, later connecting in pits in the Rhondda and elsewhere. The Rhymney Railway too opened its line from the upper part of the valleys, also reaching the Bute Dock.

In 1850, the South Wales Railway opened part of its main line; instead of bringing down minerals from the upper part of the valleys, the South Wales Railway was a trunk line, conceived to connect London (through the developing network of the Great Western Railway) with Milford Haven, and from there to generate a transatlantic shipping connection. The South Wales Railway also required a dock connection in Cardiff, for minerals it brought there from along its own line, and this demand put yet further strain on the docks. A second dock was built, and as the Bute East Dock, it opened on 20 July 1855; the original Bute Dock was renamed the Bute West Dock.

From these years, there was continual feuding between the Taff Vale Railway and the Rhymney Railway. Finally, on 7 October 1871, the London and North Western Railway secured access to the docks by virtue of running powers over the Rhymney Railway.

== Other docks ==
The Bute docks in Cardiff were not the only docks available. From the outset, Newport Docks had been a serious rival. Further west, the small harbour at Porthcawl, and the Port Talbot docks were important alternatives, although Porthcawl never developed much. Swansea too, after a late start, became the home of an important dock operation.

Nevertheless, the huge expansion of South Wales steam coal overwhelmed the available dock facilities, and this led to corresponding hostility to the Bute Docks Trustees, who were seen with some justification as happy to take excessive charges for the use of the dock without making adequate steps to enhance the capacity, and more importantly, to modernise the mechanical handling facilities in their dock.

This feeling led to a long-standing desire to build alternative dock facilities in the Cardiff general area. These included Penarth Dock, developed by the Taff Vale Railway, Roath, also developed by the TVR and reached by the building of a new branch line opened in 1888, and Barry Docks. This last was an extensive dock facility laid out with plenty of space and the latest loading aids, with the benefit of new access railways not constrained by the capacity of the existing railways. The Taff Vale Railway had long been criticised for congestion of its lines leading to the Bute docks.

== Building a new railway ==
Against this background the trustees of the Earl of Bute decided that they should build a railway line to get access to the lucrative traffic in coal and other minerals from the Rhondda and the upper part of the Taff Valley and the Cynon Valley. This, they believed, would enhance their income from transport to their docks as well as the operation of the docks as such. In 1885, they purchased the moribund Glamorganshire Canal and the Aberdare Canal, with the intention of converting them both into railway lines. This was not proceeded with at once, but in the 1896 session of Parliament, the trustees submitted a bill for the purpose.

The Taff Vale Railway saw this as an obvious assault on its established near-monopoly in those areas, and sought to counter-attack by proposing yet another dock near Cardiff, on the east bank of the River Ely opposite Penarth, and a bill was submitted for this work in the 1896 session. Both this and the Bute Bills were rejected, however.

Cardiff Railway Act 1897
- Act of Parliament
- Parliament of the United Kingdom
- Long title: An Act for empowering the Bute Docks Company to construct certain Railways for conferring upon that Company certain running powers for empowering them to construct a Low Water Pier for changing the name of the Company and for authorising the Company to raise Additional Capital and for other purposes.
- Citation: 60 & 61 Vict. c. ccvii

Dates
- Royal assent: 6 August 1897

Status: Current legislation

Text of statute as originally enacted

In the following session, both companies tried their proposals once again in Parliament, and this time the Bute Trustees were successful. Their act of Parliament, Cardiff Railway Act 1897 (60 & 61 Vict. c. ccvii), of 6 August 1897, authorised a line from a junction with the Rhymney Railway at Heath to the Taff Vale at Pontypridd, with a junction to the Taff Vale Railway at Treforest. The act authorised the change of name from the Bute Docks to the Cardiff Railway, although the dock operation was to be included in the new company's activity.

Cardiff Railway Act 1898
- Act of Parliament
- Parliament of the United Kingdom
- Long title: An Act for empowering the Cardiff Railway Company to construct new railways in the county of Glamorgan to make further provisions as to the capital of the Company and for other purposes.
- Citation: 61 & 62 Vict. c. cclxii

Dates
- Royal assent: 12 August 1898

Status: Current legislation

Text of statute as originally enacted

Cardiff Railway Act 1899
- Act of Parliament
- Parliament of the United Kingdom
- Long title: An Act for empowering the Cardiff Railway Company to construct new railways and to abandon the construction of portions of railways already authorised for extending the time for the purchase of lands for and for the completion of certain railways and for other purposes.
- Citation: 62 & 63 Vict. c. lxi

Dates
- Royal assent: 13 July 1899

Text of statute as originally enacted

Cardiff Railway Act 1901
- Act of Parliament
- Parliament of the United Kingdom
- Long title: An Act for extending the time limited for acquisition of land and completion of works under the Cardiff Railway Acts 1897 1898 and 1899 for sanctioning an alteration of the levels of Railway No. 4 authorised by the Cardiff Railway Act 1897 for further empowering the trustees of the will of the second Marquess of Bute to hold ordinary shares or stock in the capital of the Cardiff Railway Company and for other purposes.
- Citation: 1 Edw. 7. c. ccxxxix

Dates
- Royal assent: 9 August 1901

Cardiff Railway Act 1903
- Act of Parliament
- Parliament of the United Kingdom
- Long title: An Act for empowering the Cardiff Railway Company to construct a new railway and works and to abandon the construction of a portion of railway already authorised for extending the time for the completion of certain railways and works and for other purposes.
- Citation: 3 Edw. 7. c. cxvii

Dates
- Royal assent: 21 July 1903

Text of statute as originally enacted

Cardiff Railway Act 1904
- Act of Parliament
- Parliament of the United Kingdom
- Long title: An Act for empowering the Cardiff Railway Company to construct a new Railway and to abandon the construction of a portion of Railway already authorised and for amending the Acts relating to the Cardiff Railway Company and for other purposes.
- Citation: 4 Edw. 7. c. cxcv

Dates
- Royal assent: 15 August 1904

Text of statute as originally enacted

The Taff Vale Railway was alarmed at this development, as it could only result in traffic, and income, being diverted from its line to the Cardiff Railway. Having found success, the Cardiff Railway promoted a further bill in the following session, and was authorised as the Cardiff Railway Act 1898 (61 & 62 Vict. c. cclxii) on 12 August 1898 to build a railway from Roath Dock to its newly authorised line, joining the Rhymney Railway near the junction. Also proposed in the bill was a new line from Heath Junction to the docks, which would have made the Cardiff Railway independent of other lines at the southern end, but this was rejected by Parliament.

== The junction at Treforest ==
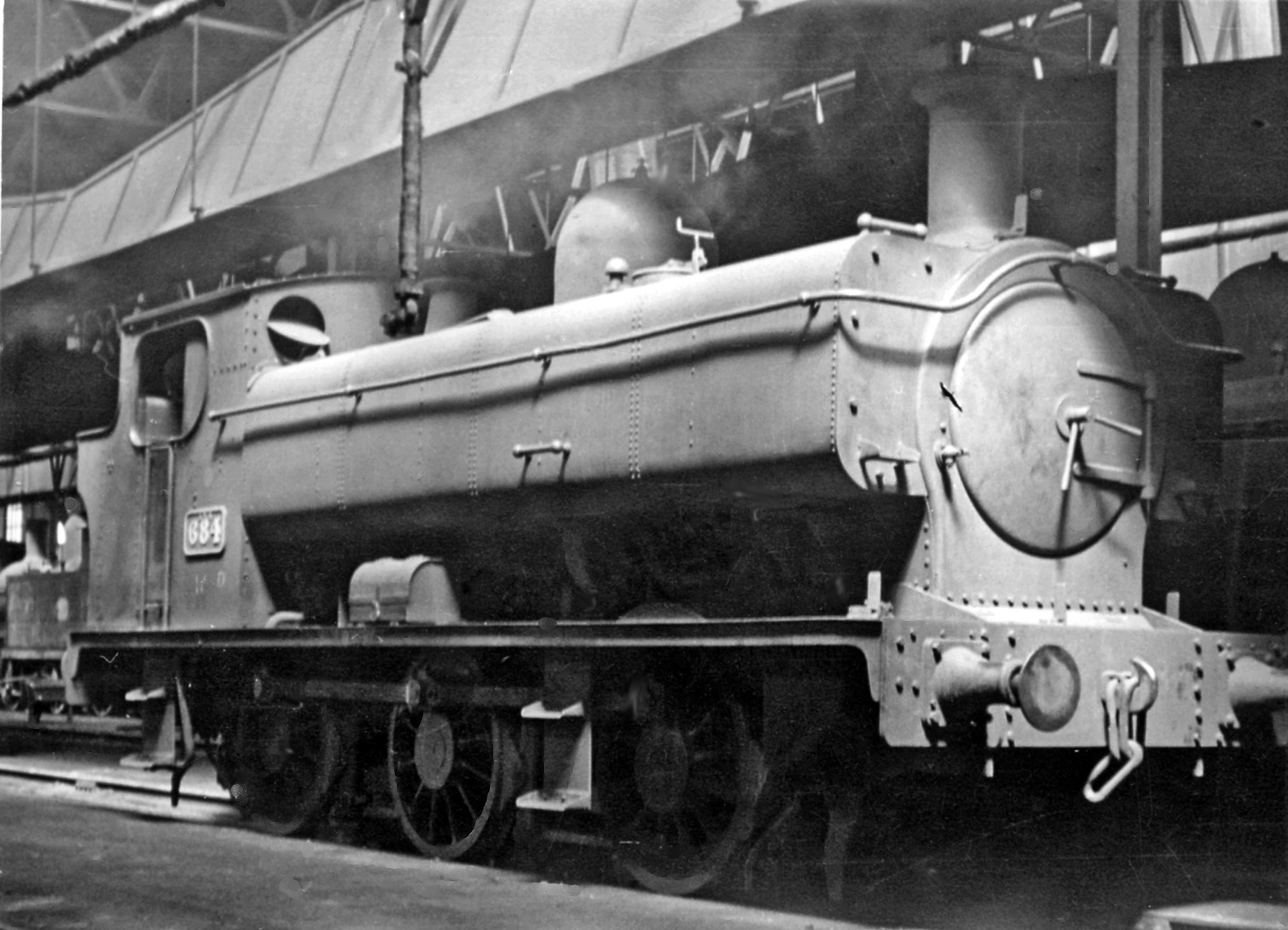
Ex-Cardiff Railway 0-6-0T No. 684 inside Cardiff East Dock Shed 1950

On 30 January 1902, the board was informed that the construction to Tongwynlais was substantially completed, and, at this time, the company put details of its proposed junction with the Taff Vale Railway at Treforest to that company for approval.

The terrain at the point chosen by the Cardiff Railway for its junction with the Taff Vale was extremely awkward. The Taff Vale Railway run down the west bank of the River Taff and was closely hemmed in by the hills to the west. Immediately to the east was the River Taff and the Glamorganshire Canal, and then the Pontypridd, Caerphilly and Newport Railway, and then more hills.

The Taff Vale Railway at this point was quadruple track, with the passenger lines on the east side and goods and mineral tracks on the west side. Immediately north of the proposed point of junction, southbound trains could diverge to the lines of the Barry Railway Company. It was a point of contention that many mineral trains were divided at this location, on the running line, with one portion for Cardiff TVR and one for the Barry line.

The Cardiff Railway proposed to join the passenger lines and then make crossovers to the mineral lines—the main object of their railway was of course the mineral traffic. The existing traffic on the TVR was remarkably intensive at this time, and the proposal alarmed the company. They examined the rights of the Cardiff Railway and saw that there were no running powers granted on their own line, nor powers to connect to all four tracks; moreover, they claimed, the alignment proposed by the Cardiff Railway was outside the limits of deviation permitted by the Cardiff Railway Act.

Cardiff Railway Act 1906
- Act of Parliament
- Parliament of the United Kingdom
- Long title: An Act for empowering the Cardiff Railway Company to make a deviation of a portion of Railway No. 4 authorised by the Cardiff Railway Act 1897 for extending the time for the purchase of certain lands and for the completion of certain railways and for other purposes.
- Citation: 6 Edw. 7. c. clvii

Dates
- Royal assent: 4 August 1906

Cardiff Railway Act 1908
- Act of Parliament
- Parliament of the United Kingdom
- Long title: An Act for empowering the Cardiff Railway Company to construct new railways for extending the time for the purchase of certain lands and for the completion of certain railways for reviving the powers of the Company to construct certain works for confirming an agreement between the Caerphilly Urban District Council and the Company and for other purposes.
- Citation: 8 Edw. 7. c. xxxviii

Dates
- Royal assent: 1 August 1908

Text of statute as originally enacted

Cardiff Railway Act 1910
- Act of Parliament
- Parliament of the United Kingdom
- Long title: An Act to extend the time limited by the Cardiff Railway Acts 1897 1898 1899 1903 1904 1906 and 1908 for the purchase of certain lands and for the completion of Railway No. 2 authorised by the Cardiff Railway Act 1908 to authorise the Company to raise additional capital and for other purposes.
- Citation: 10 Edw. 7 & 1 Geo. 5. c. xlvi

Dates
- Royal assent: 26 July 1910

Text of statute as originally enacted

Cardiff Railway Act 1912
- Act of Parliament
- Parliament of the United Kingdom
- Long title: An Act to extend the time limited by the Cardiff Railway Acts 1897 1898 1899 1903 1904 1906 1908 and 1910 for the purchase of certain lands and for other purposes.
- Citation: 2 & 3 Geo. 5. c. xxxix

Dates
- Royal assent: 7 August 1912

Text of statute as originally enacted

Cardiff Railway Act 1914
- Act of Parliament
- Parliament of the United Kingdom
- Long title: An Act to extend the time limited by the Bute Docks and Cardiff Railway Acts for the purchase of certain lands and for the completion of certain works and for other purposes.
- Citation: 4 & 5 Geo. 5. c. xvii

Dates
- Royal assent: 8 July 1914

Text of statute as originally enacted

Cardiff Railway Act 1916
- Act of Parliament
- Parliament of the United Kingdom
- Long title: An Act to extend the time limited by the Cardiff Railway Acts for the purchase of certain lands and for other purposes.
- Citation: 6 & 7 Geo. 5. c. ix

Dates
- Royal assent: 25 May 1916

Text of statute as originally enacted

The question went to arbitration, and then to litigation, and judgment was eventually given against the Cardiff Railway. The CR now went to Parliament to seek the powers that had not been granted before, and they obtained an act of Parliament, the Cardiff Railway Act 1906 (6 Edw. 7. c. clvii), on 4 August 1906, authorising the junction and crossovers they desired. However the junction was not to be opened until the Cardiff Railway had constructed exchange sidings on their own property short of the TVR main line, so that CR engines need not enter TVR tracks.

The space available for the purpose of building the sidings was constrained by the point at which the CR line crossed the River Taff, but the sidings were squeezed in. New proposals for the junction were submitted to the TVR, which again rejected them. The design was said to be dangerous; the location was very busy: 294 trains passed the location in 24 hours, and in addition the Barry section of many trains was separated there; long mineral trains were divided on the running line. The Barry Railway also objected, fearing interference with their own traffic. The exchange sidings were said to be insufficiently long to hold full length trains; the space available was clearly not long enough, unless the sidings were extended over the Taff, which would require a series of bridges for them. There was now a dispute about how long a standard wagon was, and whether new Railway Clearing House recommendations for wagon sizes had been allowed for.

Once again the matter went to arbitration, held by J. C. Inglis of the Great Western Railway, and at length Inglis found in favour of the CR in May 1908; it was now six years after the issue was first raised.

At this time the TVR offered to purchase the Cardiff Railway. With the CR docks operation, this would have been highly advantageous to the TVR, enabling them to take control of the transport of minerals to the docks and loading there. At the same time the Cardiff Railway was now in financial difficulty, having expended a major outlay on the railway and having gained no income from it. Terms were agreed, and the matter went to Parliament in the 1909 session, but Parliament rejected the proposal on the grounds of the reduction in competition that would be caused. The Barry Railway and the Alexandra (Newport and South Wales) Docks and Railway Company had opposed it, as well as the TVR.

Meanwhile, having obtained Inglis's adjudication in their favour, the Cardiff Railway laid in a temporary junction at Treforest. On 15 May 1909 a revenue-earning coal train from the Bute Colliery at Treherbert passed from the TVR system on to the Cardiff Railway. A directors' saloon was attached to the train and the Marquis of Bute and directors of the Cardiff Railway travelled in the train; the Marquis travelled on the engine for the actual crossing of the junction. Immediately after this apparent triumph, the Taff Vale Railway demanded that the temporary junction be removed, on the grounds that it was unauthorised and in a location not permitted by Parliament. (In addition it seems likely that Board of Trade approval for the configuration and working of the junction had not been obtained; as it lay in the TVR passenger line this was a requirement.)

== Construction ==
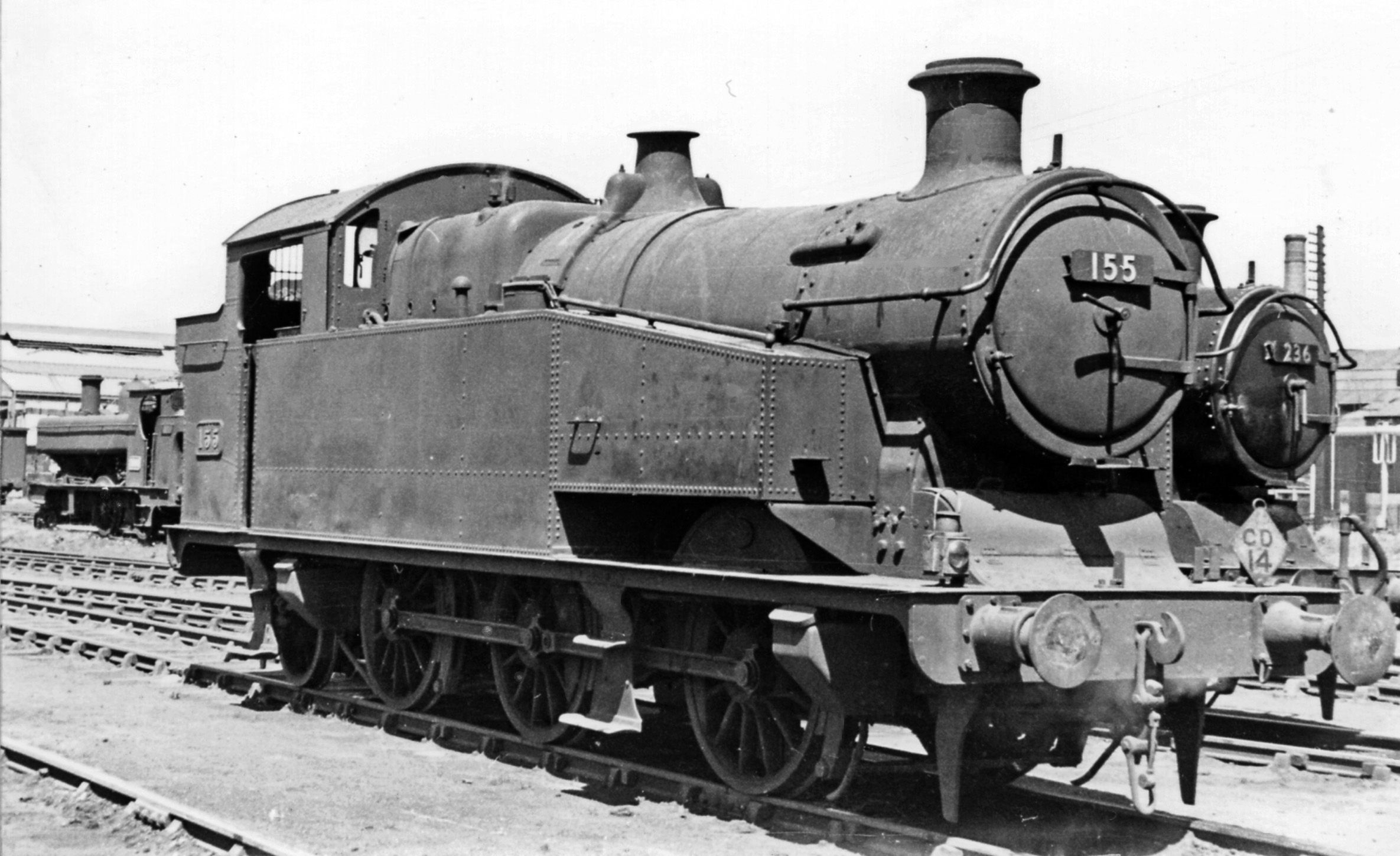
0-6-2T, No. 155 at Cardiff East Dock Depot 1950

The line had been expensive to construct; The Railway Magazine described the structure on the line:

The construction of the Cardiff Railway has involved a number of heavy engineering works. There are nine skew bridges, five crossing the Merthyr river, three across the Glamorganshire Canal, and one across the River Taff. Near Nantgawr the River Taff has been diverted. The various cuttings and embankments are mostly of an extensive character. Ten retaining walls, 12 under bridges, 10 over bridges, a short tunnel and a viaduct contributed to the difficult nature of the work. The engineers were Sir Douglas Fox and Mr. H. White, Mr. Herbert E. Allen, M.I.C.E., being resident engineer.

== Impasse ==
The Cardiff Railway were now unable to operate across the junction, and indeed never did so again. Having had no income from the line, they decided now to operate a passenger and local goods service on the part of the line up to the junction but short of it. The line was inspected by Colonel Druitt of the Board of Trade on 18 October 1910, for passenger operation from Heath Junction (with the Rhymney Railway) to "the termination in a field at Treforest". However the stations were not ready and rolling stock had not even been ordered, and Druitt declined approval.

A second inspection took place on 30 January 1911. This time approval was given. Most of the halts were merely small cleared areas of ground at ground level, and authority was given for operation by single railcars only. At this time many railway companies had been experimenting with railmotors, generally single coaches with an integrated small steam locomotive. The idea was to enable passenger operation from very low-cost stopping places. In most cases they had retractable steps so that passengers could join and alight at ground level. This was the Cardiff Railway's intended passenger operation; in fact at first only Heath had a conventional elevated passenger platform. The first steam railmotor was delivered from the Gloucester Carriage and Wagon Company on 23 February 1911, and a trailer vehicle a few days later.

A public passenger service was started on 1 March 1911. There were eleven trips each way on weekdays, and five on Sundays. A second railmotor was delivered during March, and during occasional non-availability of the vehicles, a conventional engine was hired in from the Great Western Railway to cover the service. The locomotive sections were subcontracted to Sissons of Gloucester; the passenger sections had first and third class accommodation.

An editorial in The Railway Magazine was enthusiastic:

On February 27th the first passenger trip was run on the new railway in one of the handsome rail motor cars which have been built for the Company… The train was started on the Cardiff Railway by the Marquis of Bute, who for a short time took up the position of driver. The passenger train service was publicly commenced on March 1st. The rail motor car by which the traffic is at present conducted makes 11 double journeys daily (5 on Sundays), but, pending the completion of the junction at Treforest, the terminus is at Rhyd-y-Felin.

The first stations were at Heath, Rhubina (the spelling was changed later), Whitchurch, Coryton (originally intended to be called "Asylum"), Glan-y-llyn, Nantgarw, Upper Boat and Rhyd-y-felin. A "Portobello" station was proposed, between Tongwynlais and Glan-y-llyn, but this was not built. Birchgrove was built in GWR days. A station called Treforest, as close as possible to the TVR main line, was contemplated, but probably not actually built and certainly never opened; there would have been difficult pedestrian access problems. The line was double track throughout and all the stations had "platforms" on both tracks.

There were goods sheds at Whitchurch and Glan-y-llyn, and the goods and mineral traffic was also available to operate from 1 March 1911, but there was very little demand for some considerable time. There was a colliery at Nantgarw on the line, but it too was very slow to pick up, only being commercially productive from 1920.

In 1912, the public passenger service was reduced as an economy measure.

== Grouping ==
After World War I, the government decided that most of the railways of Great Britain would be compulsorily restructured into one or other of four new large companies, the "groups". The relevant legislation was the Railways Act 1921. The so-called "Western Group" was eventually named the Great Western Railway, and the old GWR was naturally the dominant part of the new company. Nevertheless, because of the important dock activity, the Cardiff Railway was considered a constituent (not merely a "subsidiary") of the new GWR.

The Cardiff Railway reported £5.95 million of issued capital, and an income in the year 1921 of £193,973. It had distributed a dividend of 1% on ordinary stock in 1921. It handed over to the GWR 36 locomotives, mostly dock shunters, and 8 passenger vehicles and 43 freight wagons. There were 2,702 employees, reflecting the size of the dock activity rather than the railway.

The new company now had some passenger stations with duplicate names, so that from 1 July 1924 Heath became Heath Halt Low Level; Rhydyfelin became Rhydyfelin Halt Low Level; Whitchurch and Coryton acquired the geographical suffix "Glamorganshire" (or "Glam").

The section of line north of Rhydyfelin had been retained in operational condition for political reasons by the CR, but as the GWR now owned the TVR lines as well, there was no point in this, and the section north of Rhydeyfelin was placed out of use from 16 September 1924.

The light traffic on the line resulted in a decision to single the line north of Whitchurch, and this was done from 16 May 1928. The passenger business continued to decline due to bus competition, and it was reported that the takings from the passenger business at station north of Coryton were £30 a week in 1930. The line north of Coryton was therefore closed to passenger traffic on 20 July 1931.

== British Railways ==
In 1948, the main line railways of Great Britain were taken into national ownership, under British Railways. The Nantgarw colliery was buoyant at this time, and the access to it from Coryton was causing operational difficulties, as the signalling had been substantially reduced there. A new connection was installed from the former TVR main line at Taffs Well, crossing the River Taff and joining the extremity of the CR line, giving a new access to the Nantgarw mine, and enabling complete closure of the CR line north of Coryton. This was commissioned on 16 June 1952. The colliery came under threat of closure due to geological exhaustion in 1986 and the spur line was closed in 1990.

== The present day ==
The line continued an uneventful existence operating passenger trains to Cardiff.

It has developed into a useful commuter line into Cardiff from Coryton; in 2018, trains run typically at 30-minute intervals; the journey time from Coryton to Cardiff Queen Street is 14 minutes with five intermediate stops.

== Topography ==
- Heath Halt; opened 1 March 1911; renamed Heath Halt Low Level; later Heath Low Level; still open;
- Ty-glas; opened 29 April 1987; still open;
- Birchgrove; opened 10 June 1929; still open;
- Rhubina Platform; opened 1 March 1911; renamed Rhiwbina Halt from about 1938; now Rhiwbina; still open;
- Whitchurch; opened 1 March 1911; now Whitchurch (Cardiff); still open;
- Coryton Platform; opened 1 March 1911; later renamed Coryton Halt; now Coryton';relocated 20 July 1931;
- Tongwynlais; opened 1 March 1911; closed 20 July 1931;
- Glanyllyn; opened 1 March 1911; closed 20 July 1931;
- Nantgarw; opened 1 March 1911; renamed Nantgarw Low Level Halt 1924; closed 20 July 1931;
- Upper Boat; opened 1 March 1911; closed 20 July 1931;
- Rhydyfelin Low Level Halt; opened 1 March 1911; renamed Rhydyfelin Low Level Halt 1924; closed 20 July 1931;
- Treforest Junction with Taff Vale Railway.

== Locomotives ==
The Cardiff Railway had 36 steam locomotives, all built by private manufacturers, which were acquired by the GWR on 1 January 1922. For details see Locomotives of the Great Western Railway

Only one locomotive survives. Built in 1898, ex-Cardiff Railway 0-4-0ST No.5, GWR No.1338, is restored to working order, and currently preserved at the Didcot Railway Centre.

== See also ==
- Pierhead Building
