= Penarth railway station =

Railway station in the Vale of Glamorgan, Wales

Penarth
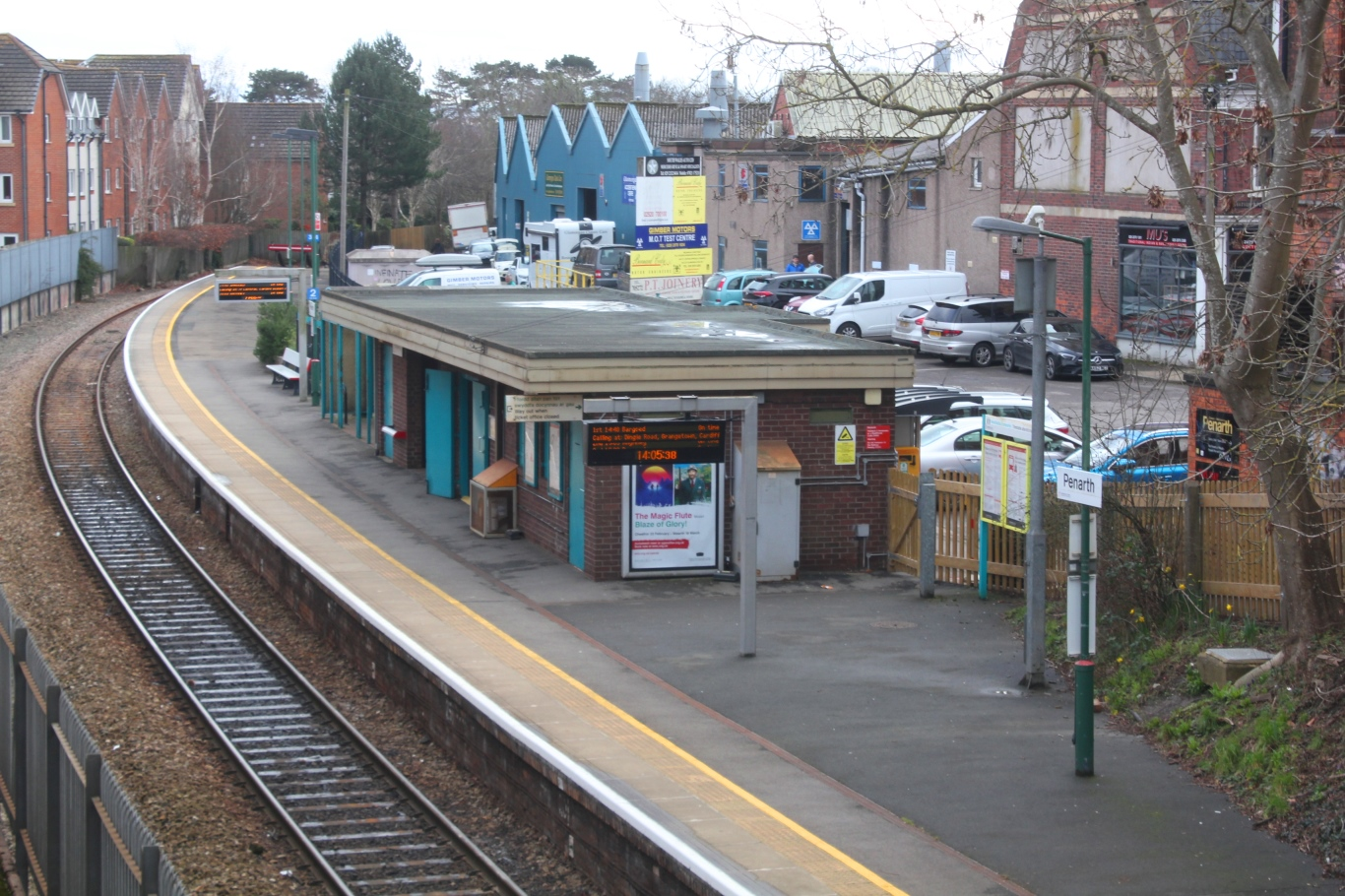

General information
- Location: Penarth, Vale of Glamorgan; Wales
- Coordinates: 51°26′08″N 3°10′28″W
- Grid reference: ST184714
- Manager: Transport for Wales
- Platforms: 1

Other information
- Station code: PEN
- Classification: DfT category E

History
- Original company: Cardiff, Penarth and Barry Junction Railway
- Pre-grouping: Taff Vale Railway
- Post-grouping: Great Western Railway

Key dates
- 20 February 1878: Opened
- 1968: Down buildings and platform removed
- 1984: Buildings replaced

Passengers
- 2020/21: ▼69,056
- 2021/22: ▲0.262 million
- 2022/23: ▲0.367 million
- 2023/24: ▲0.459 million
- 2024/25: ▲0.508 million
Location
Notes
- Passenger statistics from the Office of Rail and Road

Penarth railway station is the railway station serving the town of Penarth in the Vale of Glamorgan, South Wales. It is the terminus of Network Rail's Penarth branch running from Cogan Junction to Penarth station, 1 mile 12 chains (1.15 mi; 1.9 km) from the junction and 2 miles 67 chains (2.84 mi; 4.6 km) south of Cardiff Central station. The Penarth branch ran from Cogan Junction to Biglis Junction, a rail mileage of 5 miles 65 chains (5.81 mi; 9.4 km) and was officially closed beyond Penarth after the last passenger train ran on Saturday 4 May 1968.

== Station history ==
=== Heyday ===
Penarth Station (or Penarth Town as it was originally known) was built for the Cardiff, Penarth and Barry Junction Railway, and opened in 1878 as part of that company's new line to Lavernock. This was a continuation of the Taff Vale Railway's Penarth Extension Railway, which had been completed in February 1878 and gave the town its first rail link to Cardiff.

The Taff Vale took over the CP&BJR in 1889 and had the line completed from Lavernock to Biglis Junction (east of Cadoxton) on the Barry Railway in 1890. The extension attracted holiday and weekend traffic from Penarth to the beach at Lavernock or Barry Island Pleasure Park for the day, with steam trains running every 30 minutes from 7.15 am until 11.45 pm in both directions. There was also a sizeable amount of commuter traffic from the station eastwards into Cardiff. As first constructed the station had two side platforms and tracks (plus a non-platform line for goods traffic), a signal box and a goods yard at the Lavernock end of the station.

=== After the Beeching review ===
After The Reshaping of British Railways report, British Rail withdrew the passenger service west of Penarth on 6 May 1968. General goods traffic over the route had previously ended on 7 October 1963 (the date the goods yard here also closed), leaving only the cement trains from the factory at Cosmeston and so the line beyond there closed to all traffic. The remaining section to Penarth followed suit in November 1969 when the Snowcem works closed, leaving the station as a dead-end terminus. The line has been single track between Cogan Junction and Penarth since February 1967.

Parts of the disused trackbed through Lower Penarth and towards Sully have been blocked and built on. Other parts have been turned into a rural railway walk and cycle path from north of Alberta Place (south of Penarth station) to Brockhill Rise road overbridge, approximately one half-mile north-east of the former Lavernock station.

Until 1968 Penarth station had two platforms, one on each side of the tracks for down and up traffic, with a gated foot crossing. After the branch was singled and the line on towards Sully and Biglis Junction closed, the platform buildings on the Plymouth Road side were sold and used as a garden centre until they were demolished in the 1980s and a new Government Jobcentre plus and private offices were built in their place. The loss of the down platform and its station building also effectively closed the station's main car parking area in the specially widened eastern end of Plymouth Road.

Closure of the coastal rail line removed the direct link between Penarth and Barry, Barry Island, Rhoose or Llantwit Major. Completion of the journey from Penarth by rail today entails first travelling north as far as Grangetown, before catching a connecting train in the reverse direction to Barry or any of the stations mentioned above, thus increasing the journey time and distance travelled.

=== Original buildings ===
BR had most of the original 19th-century station buildings demolished and replaced with modern ones in a major remodelling in 1984. Since 1971 the station's original ticket office building, built in 1887, has been let as a fast food outlet.

The original Railway Hotel no longer provides accommodation but is still a public house.

== Facilities ==
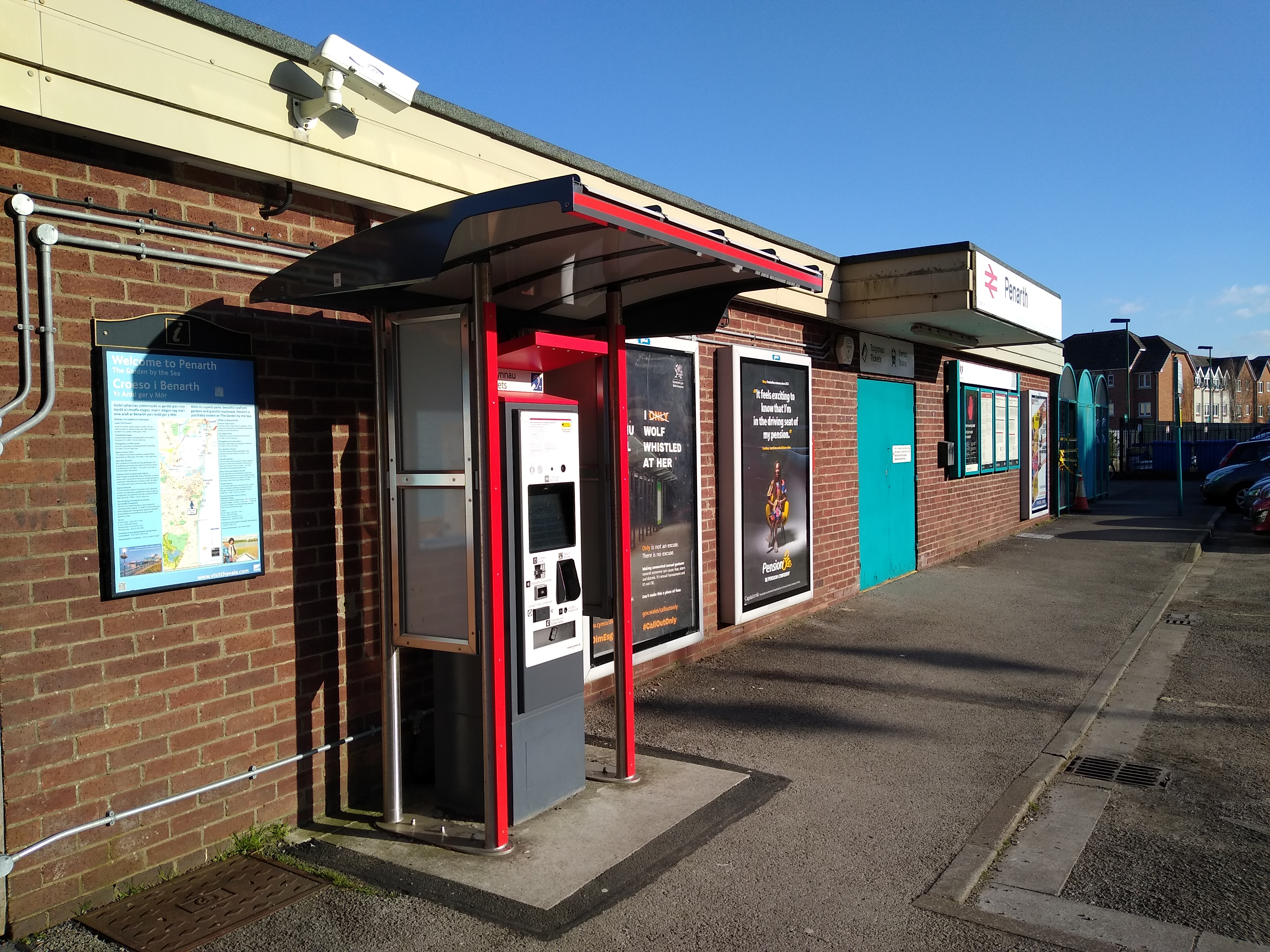
Self-service ticket machine at the station

The station has a small "drop off and pick up only" car park in Station Approach. The current ticket office in the station building is open early morning to mid-afternoon six days per week. A self-service ticket machine is provided for use and for collecting pre-paid tickets. Train running information is offered via digital CIS displays and timetable poster boards. Step-free access is available from the entrance to the ticket hall and platform.

All services on this line are currently operated by Transport for Wales as part of the Valley Lines system of the National Rail network.

== Services ==
The Monday to Saturday daytime service pattern is four trains an hour to Cardiff Central: two continue to Coryton and two to Caerphilly.

On Sundays, the service pattern is one train an hour to Cardiff Queen Street.

Preceding station	National Rail	Following station
Dingle Road	Transport for Wales; Rhymney Line	Terminus
	Disused railways	
Dingle Road	Great Western Railway; Taff Vale	Alberta Place Halt

== Barry connections ==
Since 1968 Penarth has had no direct rail link to Barry Island, although travel between the two towns remains popular. Rail passengers for Barry must travel in the opposite direction and change at Grangetown, before heading back to Barry. Alternatively, passengers may walk about 20 minutes from Penarth to Cogan railway station.

== See also ==
- Penarth Dock railway station

== Bibliography ==
- Body, G. (1983), PSL Field Guides - Railways of the Western Region, Patrick Stephens Ltd, Wellingborough, ISBN 0-85059-546-0
- Page, J. (1988), Forgotten Railways: Volume 8 - South Wales (2nd Ed), David & Charles Publishers, Newton Abbott, ISBN 0-946537-44-5
