= Cardiff Queen Street railway station =

Railway station in Cardiff, Wales

Cardiff Queen Street Welsh: Caerdydd Heol y Frenhines
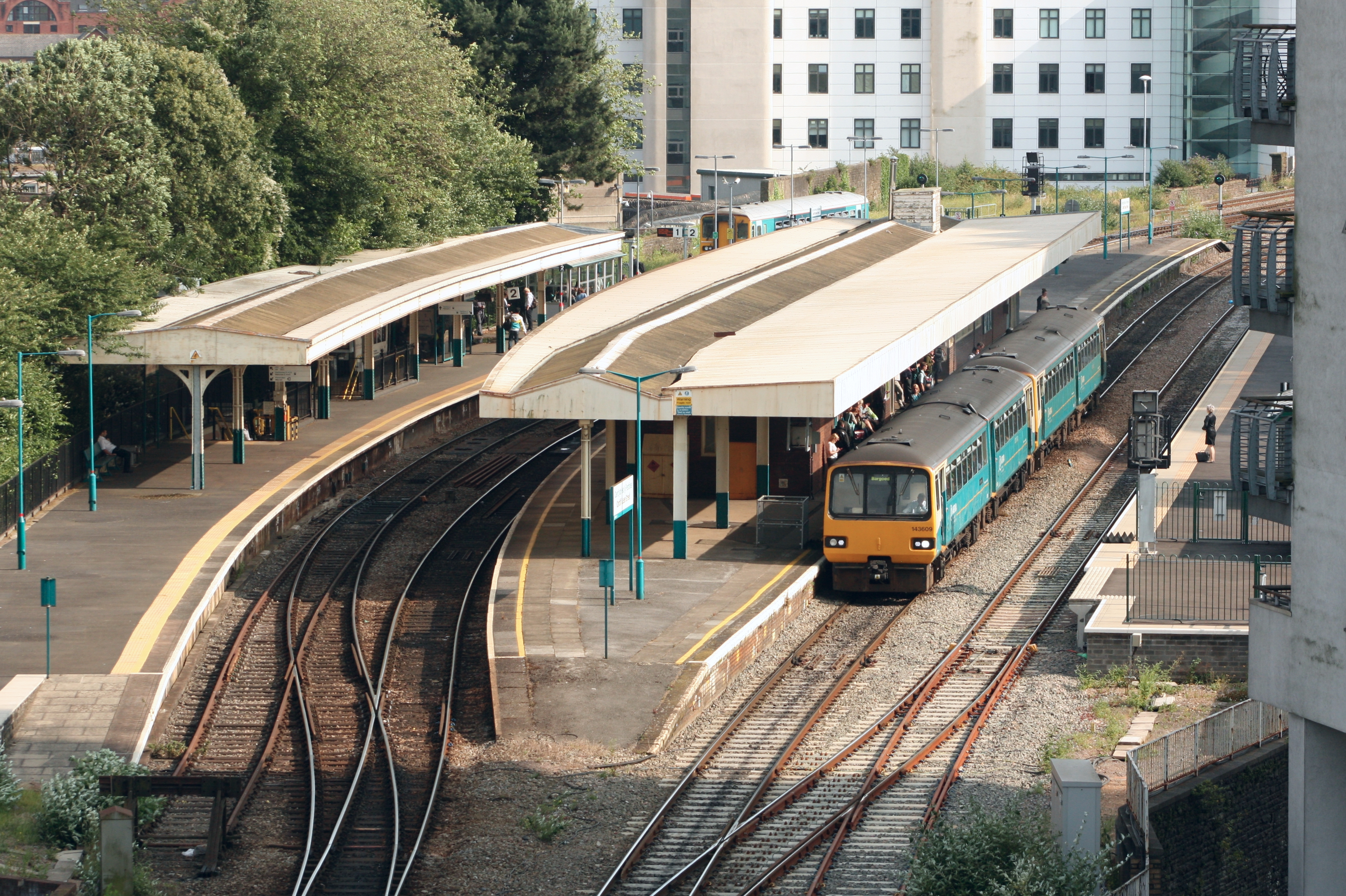
- A view of the station, from the north.

General information
- Location: Cardiff, City and County of Cardiff, Wales
- Coordinates: 51°28′55″N 3°10′13″W
- Grid reference: ST188765
- Manager: Transport for Wales
- Platforms: 5

Other information
- Station code: CDQ
- Classification: DfT category C1

Key dates
- 9 October 1840: Opened as Cardiff Taff Vale
- 1887: Rebuilt and renamed Cardiff Queen Street
- 1928: Enlarged
- 1973: Rebuilt
- 2014: Redeveloped

Passengers
- 2020/21: ▼0.473 million
- Interchange: ▼74,733
- 2021/22: ▲1.366 million
- Interchange: ▲0.271 million
- 2022/23: ▲1.714 million
- Interchange: ▲0.395 million
- 2023/24: ▲1.829 million
- Interchange: ▲0.433 million
- 2024/25: ▲2.011 million
- Interchange: ▲0.631 million
Location
Notes
- Passenger statistics from the Office of Rail and Road

Cardiff Queen Street (Welsh: Caerdydd Heol y Frenhines) serves the north and east of central Cardiff; it is the fourth busiest railway station in Wales. It is located near the major thoroughfare of Queen Street and is one of 20 stations in the city. Along with Cardiff Central, it is one of the two major hubs of the Valleys & Cardiff Local Routes local railway network. The station and its services are operated by Transport for Wales.

In 2014, a reconstruction of the station was completed in order to reduce bottlenecks. Two extra platforms were added (one extant, opposite platform 4, and one new next to platform 2 for the line to Cardiff Bay), taking the total number to five.

== History ==
=== Early history ===
The station frontage seen in 1966

The first station close to the current site was opened by the Taff Vale Railway in October 1840 and was known as Cardiff Taff Vale. It initially had one platform; a second was added in 1862 and, at the same time, the head office of the Taff Vale Railway was moved alongside the station. In 1887, Taff Vale station was demolished and replaced by a new station with the current name Cardiff Queen Street. At the time, it comprised two through platforms and a south facing bay, all covered by a large overall roof.

In 1858, the Rhymney Railway built its own terminus just to the east of Queen Street called Adam Street. This was replaced in 1871 by a new station called Cardiff Crockherbtown, a short distance north-east of Queen Street; it was renamed Cardiff (Rhymney) in 1888 and then Cardiff Parade in 1924.

The Taff Vale and Rhymney railways became part of the Great Western Railway (GWR) in 1922. As there was no longer any need for two rival stations in close proximity, the GWR opened a short connection just north of Queen Street on 15 April 1928, connecting the Rhymney line to the Taff Vale line. This allowed Parade station to be closed and its services diverted to into Queen Street. To accommodate the extra Rhymney line services, Queen Street was enlarged from three to five platforms, with the addition of a new island platform.

=== 1973 rebuild ===
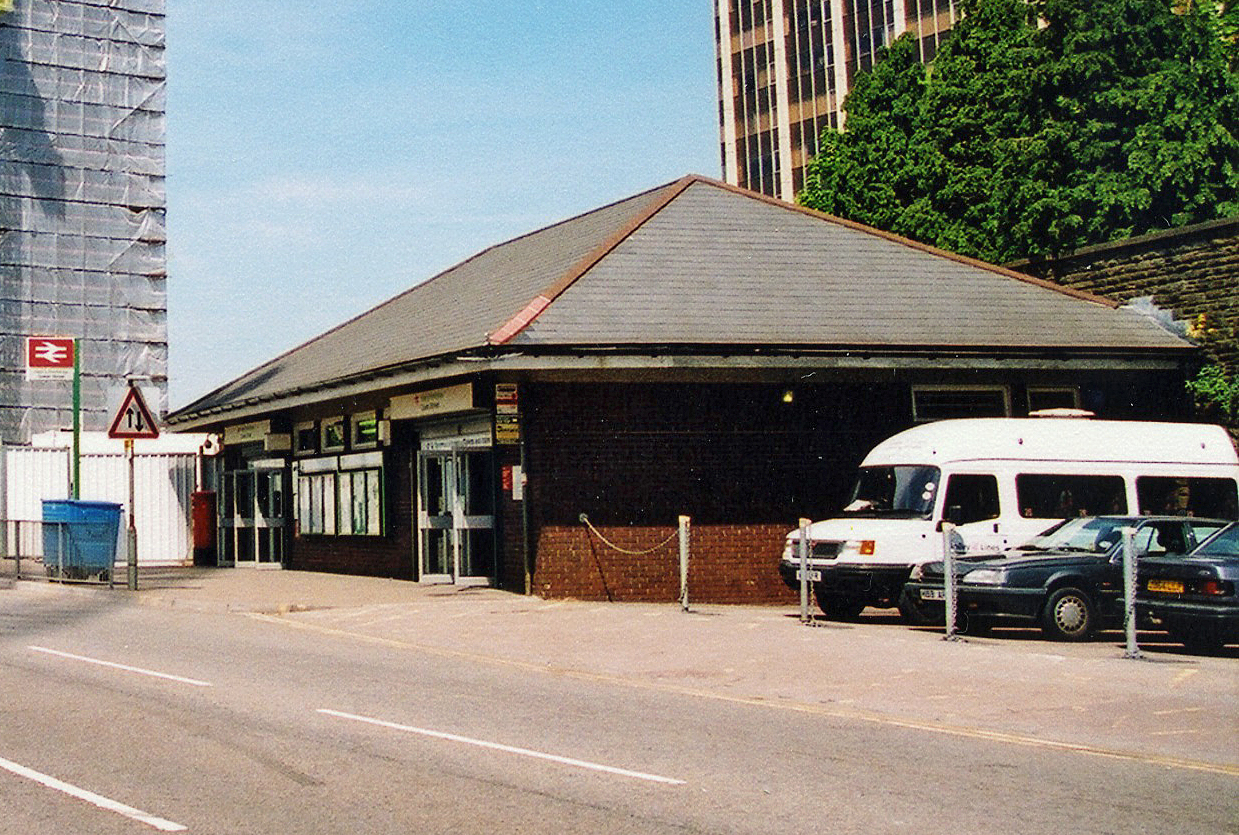
The station, seen in 2001

The station remained fairly unaltered until 1973, when it was completely rebuilt by British Rail. The station's overall roof was removed, and the original Taff Vale station frontage and booking hall was demolished; it was replaced with a modern structure and the number of platforms reduced to three: a central island and a south-facing bay. Modern electric lifts were installed to take passengers from the subway to the new platforms. On the east side of the station, a large office block called Brunel House was constructed; until 1984, it was the headquarters of the Cardiff division of British Rail's Western Region.

In 1988, the entrance building was refurbished. In March 1990, platform 3 was turned into a through platform.

In 2005, the station was fitted with new ticket gates, operational when the station is staffed, which allow easier access in both directions. In 2006, LED screens replaced the old information display monitors.

The old station car park is now dedicated for private use by residents of a nearby modern apartment block, The Aspect.

=== 2014 redevelopment ===
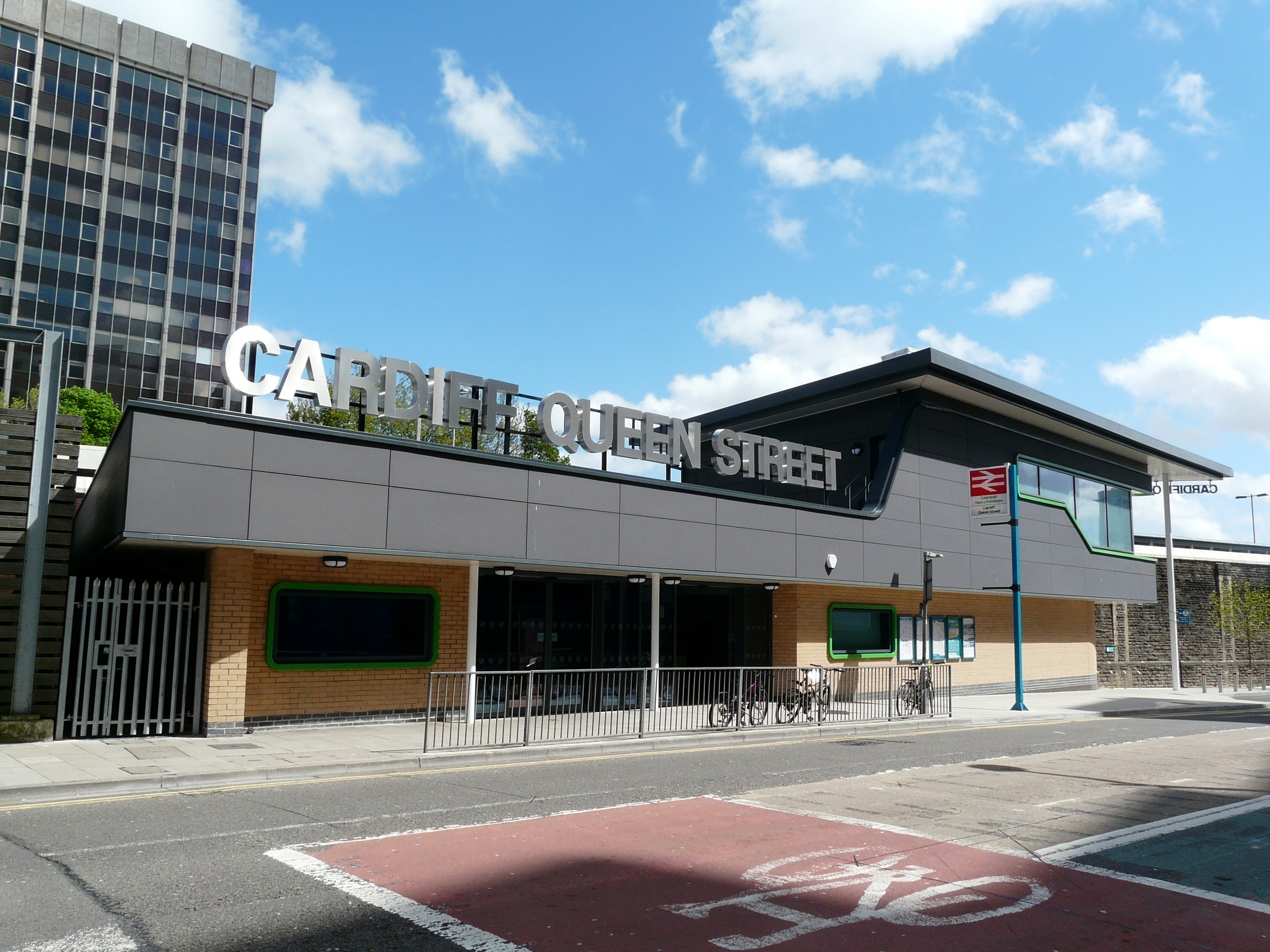
The station seen after redevelopment in 2015

As part of a £220m regeneration scheme to boost train capacity in Cardiff and the surrounding areas, Central and Queen Street stations were redeveloped from April 2013 and June 2014 respectively. The Cardiff Area Signalling Renewal project was completed by early 2017, funded by the UK Government's Department for Transport, Welsh Government and Network Rail.

As part of the scheme, a new entrance building and two new platforms were constructed at Queen Street. This brought the number of platforms back up to the pre-1973 number of five, allowing the number of trains running through the station to be increased from 12 to 16 per hour. These included a second northbound through platform and a south-facing platform reserved for the shuttle service to Cardiff Bay. The new platforms were brought into use on 14 December 2014.

In the spring of 2016, a roll of honour of those who served the armed forces between 1914 and 1919 from the Taff Vale Railway was placed on display in the ticket hall. In November 2017, a QR code was added to give more information about those commemorated in the roll call.

== Layout ==
Map of the south-east Wales railway network

Queen Street is the main hub of the Valley Lines network – a railway system serving Cardiff, the Vale of Glamorgan, Bridgend and the South Wales Valleys – and has the solitary connection to Cardiff Bay. It is located at the eastern end of the city centre, near the Capitol and St David's shopping centres; it sees heavy volumes of commuter rail traffic during the rush hour.

The station has five platforms, at a level raised above the surrounding roads:

Platform	Direction	Line	Destination
1	Southbound	Butetown branch line shuttle	Cardiff Bay
2	Southbound	Butetown branch line shuttle	Cardiff Bay
2	Southbound	Butetown branch line	Cardiff Bay
2	Southbound	Cardiff City Line, Cynon Line	Aberdare
2	Southbound	Vale of Glamorgan Line	Penarth
3	Southbound	Vale of Glamorgan Line	Bridgend, via Rhoose
3	Southbound	Vale of Glamorgan Line	Barry Island
4	Northbound	Coryton Line	Coryton
4	Northbound	Rhondda Line	Treherbert
4	Northbound	Butetown branch line	Pontypridd
4	Northbound	Taff Line	Merthyr Tydfil
5	Northbound	Rhymney Line	Rhymney
5	Northbound	Rhymney Line	Bargoed
5	Northbound	Rhymney Line	Caerphilly

== Services ==
Transport for Wales operates the following typical off-peak service, in trains per hour (tph):

Southbound:

- 12 tph to Cardiff Central; of which:
  - 8 tph continue to Grangetown, via the Vale of Glamorgan Line; of which:
    - 4 tph continue to Penarth
    - 4 tph continue to Barry; of which:
      - 3 tph continue to Barry Island
      - 1 tph continues to Bridgend, via Rhoose Cardiff International Airport
  - 2 tph continue to Aberdare, via the Cardiff City Line
  - 2 tph terminate
- 4 tph to Cardiff Bay, via the Butetown branch line.

Northbound:

- 6 trains per hour (tph) to Pontypridd, via Cathays and Radyr; of which:
  - 2 tph terminate
  - 2 tph continue to Merthyr Tydfil
  - 2 tph continue to Treherbert
- 6 tph to Caerphilly; of which:
  - 2 tph terminate
  - 2 tph continue to Bargoed
  - 2 tph continue to Rhymney
- 2 tph to Coryton.

Preceding station	National Rail	Following station
Cathays	Transport for Wales; Cardiff Bay branch line	Cardiff Bay
Heath Low Level	Transport for Wales; Coryton Line	Cardiff Central
Heath High Level	Transport for Wales; Rhymney Line	Cardiff Central
Cathays	Transport for Wales; Merthyr Line	Cardiff Central
Cathays	Transport for Wales; Rhondda Line	Cardiff Central
	Future services	
Cathays	Transport for Wales Rail; Cardiff Bay branch line	Butetown

== See also ==
- Rail transport in Cardiff
- List of railway stations in Wales
- Transport in Wales
- Commuter rail in the United Kingdom.
