= Pwll-y-Pant railway station =

Disused railway station in Pwll-y-Pant, Caerphilly

Pwll-y-Pant

General information
- Location: Pwll-y-Pant, Glamorgan; Wales
- Coordinates: 51.6626°N 3.1399°W
- Grid reference: ST212965

Other information
- Status: Disused

History
- Original company: Rhymney Railway
- Pre-grouping: Rhymney Railway

Key dates
- 1 April 1871: Opened
- 1 March 1893: Closed
Location

Pwll-y-Pant railway station served the suburb of Pwll-y-Pant, in the historical county of Glamorgan, Wales, from 1871 to 1893 on the Rhymney Railway.

== History ==
The station was opened on 1 April 1871 by the Rhymney Railway. It was known as Pwllypant in Bradshaw. It closed on 1 March 1893, being replaced by Llanbradach to the north.

Preceding station	Historical railways	Following station
Ystrad Mynach; Line and station open	Rhymney Railway	Caerphilly; Line and station open
