= Rhymney Railway =

Former railway company in South Wales

The Rhymney Railway (RR) was a railway company in South Wales, founded to transport minerals and materials to and from collieries and ironworks in the Rhymney Valley of South Wales, and to docks in Cardiff. It opened a main line in 1858, and a limited passenger service was operated in addition.

The first line was dependent on the cooperation of the parallel Taff Vale Railway (TVR) for part of the transit, and this relationship was uneasy; the Rhymney Railway built an independent line to Cardiff in 1871. Better relations were created with the London and North Western Railway (LNWR), and later the Great Western Railway (GWR), and two important joint lines with the GWR were built: the Taff Bargoed line (1876) and the Quakers Yard and Merthyr Joint line (1882).

Although the Rhymney Railway network was never large, it was remarkably profitable, and paid excellent dividends for most of its life. Dependent on mineral traffic for its own success, it declined in the 1970s, but the main line from Rhymney to Cardiff remains in heavy use as a local passenger line.

== Before the Rhymney Railway ==
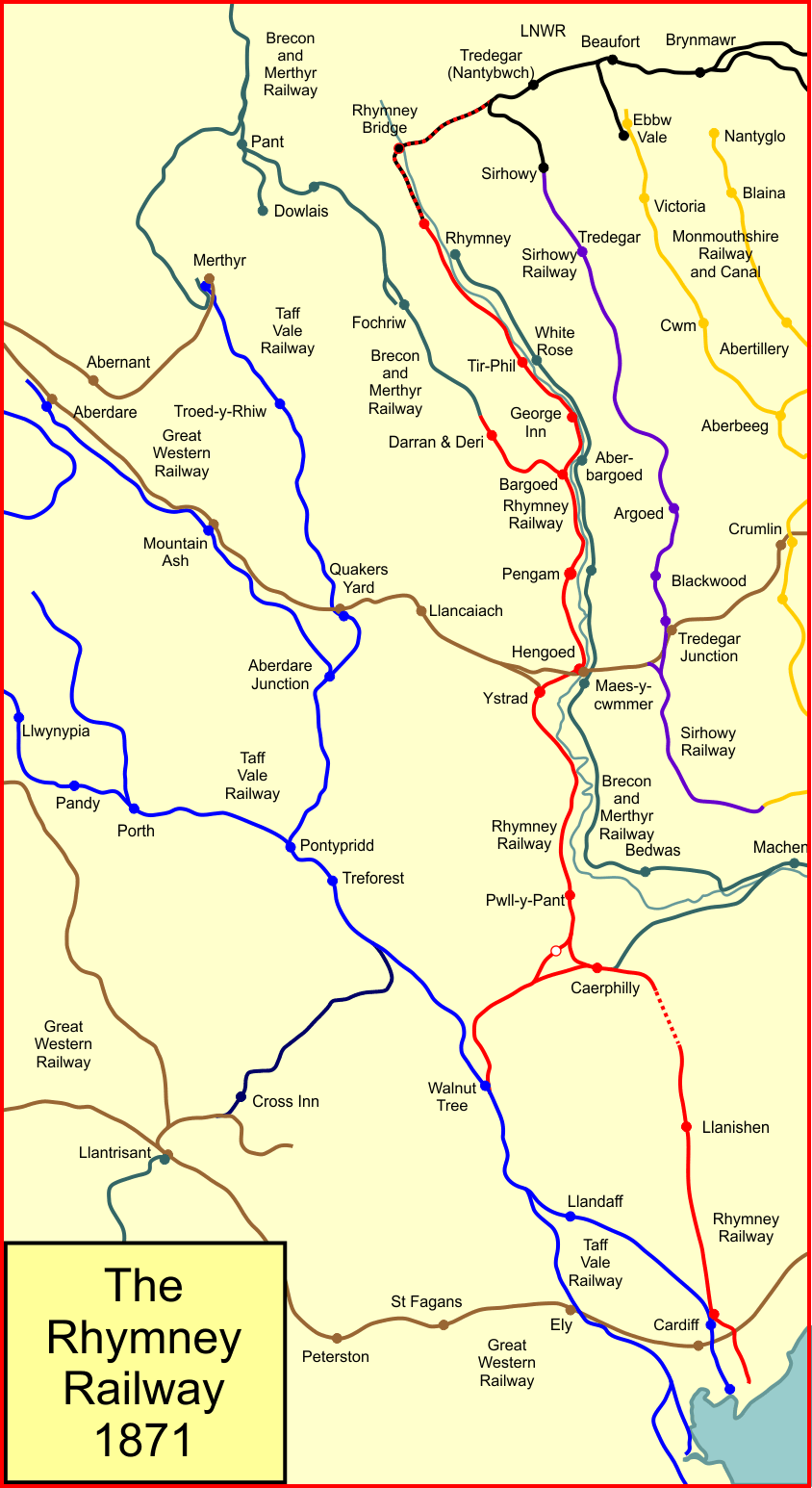
System map of the Rhymney Railway (shown in red) in 1871

The head of the River Taff valley, at Dowlais, Merthyr Tydfil and Rhymney, was the scene of huge expansion of industrial iron founding from 1760 onwards. All the ingredients were close at hand: iron ore, coal, timber and limestone. One particular resource needed to be provided, and that was transport to market. For some time this was done on the backs of animals; the road system was extremely poor in the area, and the provision of a turnpike helped, but pack animal transport was nonetheless expensive.

Canals were built: the Glamorganshire Canal and the Monmouthshire Canal. Tramroads were already in existence to bring the minerals to the ironworks, and now they could be built to convey the finished product to the canals. The authorising acts of Parliament for the canals included clauses empowering pit owners to build a connecting tramroad to the canals if the canal company failed to do so, provided the pit was within a certain distance of the canal. Compensation was to be paid to landowners over whose property the tramroad might pass, but no further legislative authority needed to be sought.

In 1800 the iron-founding industry was established at Rhymney, and this encouraged the inclusion in the Monmouthshire Canal Navigation Act 1802 (42 Geo. 3. c. cxv) of a tramroad connecting Nantybwch to the Union Iron Works in Rhymney. There were soon several ironworks in the immediate area, and a small network of tramroads developed to serve them. In 1815 the Bryn Oer Tramway was opened, connecting the ironworks northward to Trefil and on over the hills to Talybont, where a connection was made with the Abergavenny Canal.

In 1825 the Rumney Railway was incorporated. It is usually referred to as the "Old Rumney Railway", and had no organisational connection with the later Rhymney Railway. It opened about 1826, running from Rhymney to Pye Corner, on the margin of modern Newport, where it joined the Sirhowy tramroad.

The conveyance of the output of the ironworks at Merthyr and Dowlais remained a serious issue, and eventually, in 1840, the Taff Vale Railway was built as the solution to the problem. In that year and the following year the line was completed between Merthyr and Cardiff Docks. Then in 1847 the Newport, Abergavenny and Hereford Railway opened its Taff Vale Extension Railway, a long route from Pontypool in the east to Crumlin in the west at first, then extended into the Aberdare valley intersecting many valleys and connecting with many railways.

In 1850 the South Wales Railway opened part of its main line, between Chepstow and Swansea. This was built to the broad gauge and was intended as a trunk railway, connecting the network of the Great Western Railway with Milford Haven, and running through Cardiff.

== Rhymney Railway proposed ==
The Taff Vale Railway had a branch line to Llancaiach, where there were productive collieries. This spate of railway building in South Wales, mirroring that in England, encouraged thoughts of a railway serving the Rhymney ironworks. An agreement was reached with the Taff Vale Railway that it would convey the Rhymney traffic over its line from Llancaiach. Separate dock facilities at Cardiff would be provided, at what became Bute East Dock.

Rhymney Railway Act 1854
- Act of Parliament
- Parliament of the United Kingdom
- Long title: An Act for making a Railway from Rhymney to a Point of Junction with the Newport, Abergavenny, and Hereford Railway near Bedllewyn, with a Branch up the Bargoed Rumney Valley, to be called "The Rhymney Railway;" and for other Purposes.
- Citation: 17 & 18 Vict. c. cxciii

Dates
- Royal assent: 24 July 1854

Other legislation
- Repealed by: Rhymney Railway Act 1857

Status: Repealed

Text of statute as originally enacted

A bill for the Rhymney Railway went to Parliament in the 1854 session and received royal assent on 24 July 1854 as the Rhymney Railway Act 1854 (17 & 18 Vict. c. cxciii). It was to build a railway from the Rhymney ironworks, down the west bank of the River Rhymney, to a junction with the Newport, Abergavenny and Hereford Railway near Hengoed. This main line was to be 9 1/2 miles (15.3 km) long, and there was also to be a 2 3/4-mile (4.4 km) branch from Pont Aberbargoed up the Bargoed Rhymney valley to Ysgwyddgwyn. Share capital was to be £100,000.

The maritime destination which the line was to reach was described in the act as "the ports [plural] of the Bristol Channel" and the armorial bearing of the company included the coats of arms both of Cardiff and Newport, although no reason has been recorded for the Newport connection.

Rhymney Railway Amendment Act 1855
- Act of Parliament
- Parliament of the United Kingdom
- Long title: An Act to enable the Rhymney Railway Company to extend their Railway to the Taff Vale Railway, to construct Branch Railways, and for other Purposes.
- Citation: 18 & 19 Vict. c. cx

Dates
- Royal assent: 2 July 1855

Text of statute as originally enacted

The connection to the NA&HR at Llancaiach was refused on account of objection by that company, so the Rhymney Railway was without the route to the docks that it sought. It returned to Parliament the following year. It almost doubled its extent by obtaining the Rhymney Railway Amendment Act 1855 (18 & 19 Vict. c. cx), giving sanction to build on from Hengoed to Walnut Tree Bridge, joining the Taff Vale Railway near Taff's Well, a line of 9 1/2 miles (15.3 km), with a 1-mile (1.6 km) branch to Caerphilly and a 30-chain (0.60 km) branch connecting north to west on to the NA&HR at Hengoed. In addition there was a 1 1/4-mile (2.0 km) branch from Crockherbtown Junction, immediately north of the present Cardiff Queen Street station, to the Bute Dock. Running powers were granted over the Taff Vale Railway between Walnut Tree Bridge and Crockherbtown Junction.

The authorised share capital was more than doubled, an additional £130,000 being authorised by the Rhymney Railway Amendment Act 1855.

The engineer for the works was Joseph Cubitt; the Earl of Bute was the owner of the Bute Docks and his trustees built the branch to the docks, leasing it to the Rhymney Railway at 4% on capital of £67,633.

Rhymney Railway Act 1857
- Act of Parliament
- Parliament of the United Kingdom
- Long title: An Act for consolidating the Acts relating to the Rhymney Railway Company, and for authorizing the Company to make and maintain a Branch Railway, and for regulating the Capital of the Company; and for other Purposes.
- Citation: 20 & 21 Vict. c. cxl

Dates
- Royal assent: 10 August 1857

Text of statute as originally enacted

Construction proceeded but the cost of the work proved to be considerably underestimated, and the Rhymney Railway Act 1857 (20 & 21 Vict. c. cxl) was obtained to increase the share capital to £300,000. The Bute Docks branch was the first to be completed, being ready in September 1857, although the Rhymney Railway itself was not yet in a position to make use of it; some Taff Vale Railway traffic passed over it.

The approach to the junction with the TVR at Walnut Tree involved excavating a cutting to the extent of 1,000,000 cubic yards (760,000 m^{3}) of earth.

== Opening of the line ==
Thursday 25 February 1858 was fixed for the opening: 24 wagons loaded with 150 tons of Rhymney iron formed the first train, followed by a second of 40 mineral wagons containing 240 tons. The line was single-track throughout.

Passenger traffic started on 31 March 1858. There were two trains each way daily, taking 90 minutes for the 24 miles (39 km) from Cardiff to Rhymney. Three weeks later the service was augmented to three passenger trains each way daily. The Cardiff station was at Adam Street, (Note: The site is now occupied by the Knox Road multi-storey car park.) and the trains ran non-stop from there to Walnut Tree; from there the stations were Caerphilly, Ystrad, Hengoed, Pengam, Bargoed, Tir-phil and Rhymney. At Hengoed the trains made connections with the Taff Vale Extension line trains.

The Caerphilly branch was opened in 1859.

From the outset the company was in difficulty. The capital expenditure had far exceeded the budget for the work, and interest and other prior charges exceeded the net income, particularly as mineral traffic did not develop as rapidly as had been hoped. Friction developed with the Taff Vale Railway from an early date, and the Rhymney's dependency on the TVR for working its traffic over the TVR main line left the Rhymney vulnerable.

The Bute Trustees approached the Rhymney company with an offer: to lease the undertaking for 250 years retrospectively from 1 January 1860; to deal with all prior charges and in addition pay 5% on the ordinary stock from the beginning of 1865, rising gradually to that figure in the meantime. This offer was remarkably advantageous to the Rhymney's proprietors, but in 1860 and again in 1861 Parliament refused to sanction the arrangement, and the Rhymney Railway was left to resolve its problems alone.

== Financial strains ==
Frustrated with the difficulties of operating over the TVR into Cardiff, the Rhymney Railway submitted a bill in the 1861 session to build an independent line between Walnut Tree and Cardiff, but this failed in committee, although a further extension of authorised capital was permitted. The Bute Trustees evidently wished the Rhymney Railway to succeed, for they now agreed "in consideration of the capitalisation of the rent due to them" that dividends and other interest payments should have precedence over their own financial claims. The Bute Trustees were already giving the Rhymney company considerably better terms for using the dock than they had granted to the Taff Vale Railway; this was a sore point with the TVR company.

Rhymney Railway (Cardiff and Caerphilly) Act 1864
- Act of Parliament
- Parliament of the United Kingdom
- Long title: An Act for authorizing the Rhymney Railway Company to make and maintain their Cardiff and Caerphilly and other Railways; and for other Purposes.
- Citation: 27 & 28 Vict. c. cclxiv

Dates
- Royal assent: 25 July 1864

Text of statute as originally enacted

From 1862 the profitability of the company eased a little and a modest dividend was paid. However the operating difficulties over the TVR section only became worse; and in 1863 the Rhymney Railway submitted a bill to make the direct line to Cardiff from Caerphilly. On 25 July 1864, the Rhymney Railway (Cardiff and Caerphilly) Act 1864 (27 & 28 Vict. c. cclxiv) was passed, with further capital of £210,000. The running powers between Walnut Tree and Cardiff would be extinguished, except for traffic to the new docks at Penarth, from the date of opening of the direct line. A separate act of Parliament on the same day, the Brecon and Merthyr Railway (No. 1) Act 1864 (27 & 28 Vict. c. cclxv) gave permission for a short stub to make a connection east of Caerphilly with the Brecon and Merthyr Railway's Caerphilly branch.

In fact the construction of the line proved very difficult at a time when money was becoming very scarce; as well as labour problems the Caerphilly Tunnel gave exceptional difficulty. At 1 mile 173 yards (1.768 km) in length it was a hard drive, and an unknown spring in the middle during construction proved difficult to get under control. (Note: The spring gave 60 million imperial gallons (270,000 m^{3}) of water annually for locomotive purposes in later years.)

== Brecon and Merthyr Railway ==
Rhymney Railway (Capital and Branch) Act 1861
- Act of Parliament
- Parliament of the United Kingdom
- Long title: An Act for reviving the Powers of the Rhymney Railway Company with respect to their Bargoed Rhymney Branch Railway, and for authorizing them to raise further Monies; and for other Purposes.
- Citation: 24 & 25 Vict. c. cxliv

Dates
- Royal assent: 11 July 1861

In 1859 the Brecon and Merthyr Tydfil Junction Railway (B&MR) had been incorporated, to build a line from the north at Brecon, into Merthyr Tydfil, Dowlais and Rhymney. At first this appeared to complement the Rhymney Railway's activity, but the mood gradually changed and in 1863 the B&MR acquired the Old Rumney Railway, with the obvious intention of reaching the docks at Newport and competing directly with the Rhymney Railway. In self-defence the Rhymney Railway, seeing this coming, had obtained powers in the Rhymney Railway (Capital and Branch) Act 1861 (24 & 25 Vict. c. cxliv) for a Bargoed Rhymney branch line, covering pretty much the same terrain as the B&MR intentions.

The wasteful competition was abated when the two companies agreed reluctantly to cooperate. The Rhymney Railway built the southern part of the route from Bargoed to Deri Junction, there to form an end-on junction with the B&MR line. (The location was later the site of Darran and Deri station.) The Rhymney's part of the line opened in March 1864. The B&MR was approaching from the north, and was ready for traffic in 1865, but legal complications prevented actual opening until March 1868.

Mutual running powers were agreed, in the Rhymney's case as far as Pantywaun Junction, 4 miles (6 km) above Deri (where the Dowlais Ironworks railway system made a junction with the B&MR line), although in practice they were only used as far as Fochriw Colliery.

The Deri branch of the Rhymney Railway was doubled in 1909.

== London and North Western Railway ==
The Merthyr, Tredegar and Abergavenny Railway was building its line across the heads of the valleys, giving an exit for Merthyr and Dowlais iron to the industrial Midlands and North of England over the Newport, Abergavenny and Hereford Railway and associated companies further north. The London and North Western Railway had certain rights over the NA&HR line, and seeing now an opportunity to get access to South Wales, it acquired a lease of the MT&AR in 1862. By 1864 the LNWR had pushed as far west as Nantybwch.

Rhymney Railway (Northern Lines) Act 1864
- Act of Parliament
- Parliament of the United Kingdom
- Long title: An Act for authorizing the Rhymney Railway Company to make and maintain Lines of Railway to join the Brecon and Merthyr Tydfil Junction Railway and the Merthyr, Tredegar, and Abergavenny Railway respectively; and for other Purposes.
- Citation: 27 & 28 Vict. c. cclxxv

Dates
- Royal assent: 25 July 1864

Text of statute as originally enacted

The LNWR was friendly towards the Rhymney Railway and a physical connection was obviously desirable, so the Rhymney Railway (Northern Lines) Act 1864 (27 & 28 Vict. c. cclxxv) of 25 July 1864 authorised a line northward from Rhymney to Nantybwch on the MT&AR.

The Rhymney Railway and the LNWR agreed to construct the connecting line jointly, and running powers were granted to the Rhymney along the MT&AR as far as Ebbw Vale, although in practice these were not used. The LNWR did well out of the exchange of running powers, receiving the right to run to Cardiff and Penarth over the RR system, although this required the acquiescence of the Taff Vale Railway, which was not easily obtained.

The 3-mile (5 km) line was opened formally on 5 September 1871, although the public opening was not until 2 October 1871. The line climbed at 1 in 35 to Rhymney Bridge station, and from there to Nantybwch the joint line was part of the MT&AR. The LNWR immediately made use of the route to get access to Cardiff for general goods traffic; until this time it had passed via Newport, being transshipped there to broad gauge wagons as the former South Wales Railway route was still broad gauge.

The LNWR now carried a lot of traffic to Cardiff and soon was receiving complaints that it had inadequate warehousing facilities there; it responded by building its own goods station at Tyndall Street.

== Taff Bargoed Line ==
Rhymney Railway Act 1867
- Act of Parliament
- Parliament of the United Kingdom
- Long title: An Act for authorizing the Rhymney Rail way Company to make additional Railways, and to use Parts of the Great Western Railway, and to raise additional Monies, and for other Purposes; and of which the Short Title is "Rhymney Railway Act, 1867."
- Citation: 30 & 31 Vict. c. clxxi

Dates
- Royal assent: 12 August 1867

Text of statute as originally enacted

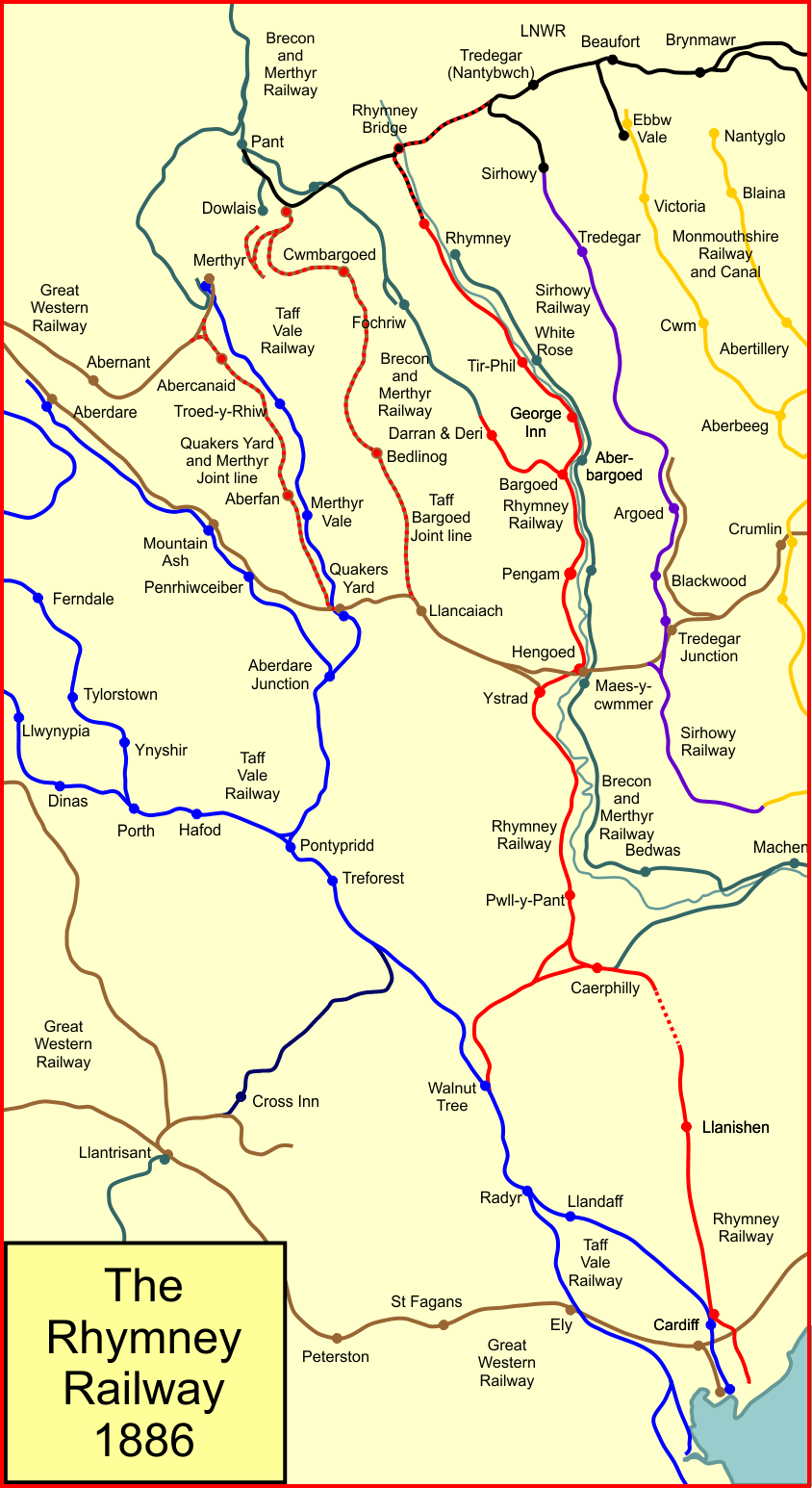
System map of the Rhymney Railway (shown in red) in 1886

In 1867 the Rhymney Railway was considering how it might reach Dowlais and Merthyr directly. The trade in the iron industry was changing, and no longer was locally extracted iron ore dominant in the iron foundries of Dowlais: imported ore was being used to an increasing extent, and being hauled up the gradient from the coastal ports. The obvious route appeared to be the Taff Bargoed valley, as yet without railway access. At the same time the Great Western Railway had a corresponding idea, and on 29 March 1867 the Rhymney and the GWR agreed to build the line jointly. This was ratified by an act of Parliament of 12 August 1867, the Rhymney Railway Act 1867 (30 & 31 Vict. c. clxxi). There was to be a generous exchange of running powers.

It was to run from a junction near Llancaiach on the Taff Vale Extension line, to Dowlais (Cae Harris), a distance of 9 1/4 miles (14.9 km), making a connection there with the tramroad network of the Dowlais Iron Company.

There were serious labour difficulties in constructing the line, however, and it did not open until 10 January 1876. (Note: Barrie, and Kidner. Hopwood says mineral traffic on 20 December 1875, and passengers on 1 February 1876. MacDermot says goods 10 January 1876 and passengers 1 February 1876.) A short branch from Cwm Bargoed on the Taff Bargoed line to Fochriw Colliery was opened as part of the works. At Dowlais, as well as connecting directly to the Dowlais Iron Company's network, the new railway had a branch known as the Zig-zag Branch on the south-west side of Dowlais; the zig-zag climbed at 1 in 35 to gain height to reach another part of the Dowlais complex.

Much of the main line of the Taff Bargoed line climbed to Dowlais at 1 in 40 and 1 in 49, against loaded traffic. The summit on the line is at an altitude of 1,250 feet (381 m) above sea level. The stations on the line were Bedlinog and Cwm Bargoed but halts were built later for the Bedlinog, Nantwen, Nantyffin and Penydarren collieries.

== Caerphilly to Cardiff line opened ==
On 1 April 1871 the Rhymney Railway was at last able to open its own direct Caerphilly to Cardiff line. It had a falling gradient all the way to Cardiff, where it made a junction with its own line to the Bute Docks. It was double track.

Crockherbtown junction had been the point of divergence of the Taff Vale Railway and the Rhymney lines to the docks. Now the new line joined in there, but without the facility of running direct from Caerphilly to the TVR docks. The Cardiff station at Adam Street was closed to passengers, and a new Cardiff station, Cardiff Crockherbtown, north of the present-day Cardiff Queen Street was established. The TVR Cardiff station was on the south side of the thoroughfare. (Note: At this time the road now called Queen Street was known as Crockherbtown Street, hence the name of the railway junction. It was renamed Queen Street by decision of the Town Council on 12 December 1886, in honour of the Golden Jubilee of Queen Victoria.)

== Ystrad Mynach to Penalltau Junction ==
In 1871 another, short branch was opened: it was from Ystrad Mynach on the Rhymney main line to Penalltau Junction on the Taff Vale Extension line. By this time the Great Western Railway had taken over the Newport, Abergavenny and Hereford Railway (through its successor, the West Midland Railway) so the Taff Vale Extension was GWR territory. The line had been extended to Middle Duffryn in the Aberdare Valley, and connected there with the Vale of Neath Railway, also now controlled by the GWR. As part of the deal when the Taff Bargoed line was agreed with the GWR, the Rhymney Railway had secured running powers through Aberdare to Hirwaun.

The new line would therefore give it access, from Ystrad Mynach, to the hugely expanding mineral resources of the Aberdare region, as well as to the Taff Bargoed line at a junction near Llancaiach. The line opened on 27 September 1871.

== Congestion, and doubling the line ==
Apart from the new Cardiff to Caerphilly line, the Rhymney Railway was all single track, and the massive expansion of mineral traffic was becoming difficult to handle, leading to complaints about passenger train delays. The company was forced to double the line between Caerphilly and Ystrad Mynach in 1872, and other expensive improvements, as well as enhancements to the locomotive fleet, had to follow.

== The Pontypridd, Caerphilly and Newport Railway ==
Newport Docks had long been dominant in the area, and had been expanding continuously for some time. The owners naturally wished to maximise the mineral traffic through their docks, and were held back by the difficult connection from the Taff Vale.

On 25 July 1884 the Pontypridd Caerphilly and Newport Railway (Note: PC&NR; but there was another PC&NR nearby, the Pontypool, Caerleon and Newport Railway.) was opened, encouraged by the Alexandra (Newport and South Wales) Docks and Railway. It formed a junction with the Taff Vale Railway near Pontypridd, and connected to Newport by running powers over the Rhymney Railway and the Brecon and Merthyr Railway. The Rhymney part of that was a relatively short transit from Penrhos Junction through Caerphilly to an end-on junction with the B&M 1/2 mile (0.8 km) east of Caerphilly.

The Rhymney had to improve its Caerphilly–Penrhos Junction line, which had not been kept up to a standard suited to passenger work since its own trains over this line had ceased in 1871.

The RR and the LNWR got running powers to Pontypridd, and the PC&NR got running powers into Cardiff over the Rhymney Railway. The Rhymney's powers to Pontypridd were rendered unusable by the obstructive attitude of the TVR.

== Quakers Yard and Merthyr Joint Line ==
A further joint venture with the Great Western Railway led to Merthyr Tydfil. Although the GWR already had a presence at Merthyr through the Vale of Neath line, up to that point the Taff Vale Railway had a monopoly of the direct routes from Merthyr to the south and east.

Now the Quakers Yard and Merthyr line was opened on 1 April 1886 from the Taff Vale Extension line at Quakers Yard running up the west side of the River Taff to Merthyr, ending at the GWR station there. Colliery and ironstone pit connections were made intermediately, and a branch line spur crossed the Taff to get access to the important Merthyr Vale colliery.

There was already a railway running part of the way down the west bank: the private Gethin Railway belonging to the Cyfarthfa Ironworks, and this could be latched onto in the vicinity of Abercanaid, and a simple spur provided where it crossed the GWR Hirwaun line to bring the joint trains into Merthyr High Street station.

The line opened for passenger traffic on 1 April 1886, (Note: Kidner says on page 24, "The last chapter ended with the joint GWR/RR line from Quaker's Yard to Merthyr under construction; this opened for passenger traffic on 18th August, 1882". This is a mistake.) trains using the High Street station at Merthyr. The new line crossed over the Taff Vale line and the Glamorganshire Canal shortly after leaving Quakers Yard GWR (later High Level) station, and at nearly 2 miles (3 km) south there was a branch on the east side to the Merthyr Vale group of coal pits, crossing the river on a long steel viaduct. There were stations at Aberfan and Abercanaid, and the service was worked by the Rhymney company. At Cyfarthfa Level Crossing Junction, where the spur to the former Vale of Neath line ran round Glyndyris Pond, the private Gethin Railway ran straight on to the Cyfarthfa Ironworks, with a branch to the east running up to the Ynys Fach works, and Rhymney goods trains and workmen's trains ran up to Cyfarthfa Furnace Tops.

The QY&MR Joint Line crossed the river Taff immediately after leaving Quakers Yard station. The near collapse of the viaduct over the river was the cause of the termination of the passenger operation on the QY&M line in February 1951.

The line above Merthyr Vale was singled in 1952.

== Aber branch (Senghenydd) ==
Rhymney Railway Act 1890
- Act of Parliament
- Parliament of the United Kingdom
- Long title: An Act to authorise the Rhymney Railway Company to make new Railways to raise additional Capital and for other purposes.
- Citation: 53 & 54 Vict. c. cxxxiii

Dates
- Royal assent: 25 July 1890

Text of statute as originally enacted

On 1 February 1894 the Aber branch, to Senghenydd, at the head of a steep valley formed by the Nant-yr-aber stream, was opened. This line of 3 1/2 miles (5.6 km) was constructed to serve collieries that were developing in the valley; it had been authorised by the Rhymney Railway Act 1890 (53 & 54 Vict. c. cxxxiii) of 25 July 1890.

1 mile (1.6 km) of track had been laid up the valley in 1865 to serve the Tir Gibbon and Hendredenny collieries. By the Rhymney Railway Act 1890 this was to be converted into a proper branch line for goods and passengers, the sponsors being the Windsor Steam Coal Company and the Lewis Merthyr Consolidated Collieries. There was a passing place at Abertridwr, near where the Windsor colliery was sunk. From Penyrheol, 3/4 mile (1.2 km) from Aber, there was a continuous climb starting at 1 in 58 and steepening to 1 in 49 near the terminus, which comprised a station, extensive colliery sidings and a locomotive shed.

Passenger traffic ceased in 1964. The line continued to serve Windsor Colliery at Abertridwr until 30 June 1977 when an underground link was opened between the colliery and Nantgarw Colliery which was served by a branch from the Cardiff-Pontypridd line. The line closed on 5 September 1977.

== Cylla branch ==
Rhymney Railway Act 1895
- Act of Parliament
- Parliament of the United Kingdom
- Long title: An Act to authorise the Rhymney Railway Company to make a new Railway to raise additional Capital to revive and extend the time for purchasing Lands for and constructing certain authorised Railways to abandon other Railways to make provisions as to the Stock and Share Capital of the Company and for other purposes.
- Citation: 58 & 59 Vict. c. xxxv

Dates
- Royal assent: 30 May 1895

Text of statute as originally enacted

On 30 May 1895 the Cylla branch was authorised by the Rhymney Railway Act 1895 (58 & 59 Vict. c. xxxv). It took some time to be made ready, the first section opening on 1 August 1906, serving a Powell Duffryn colliery. The complete branch did not open until 1909. It diverged from the Rhymney main line at Ystrad Mynach, occupying the fork between the main line and the Penalltau line, and running northwards to Cylla and Penrhiwfelin, a total of 2 miles 13 chains (3.48 km). The line was for mineral traffic only and never carried passengers, but there was a miners' service.

Ordnance Survey maps for 1919, 1921–22 and 1938 show a Penrhiwfelin Halt at the head of the branch.

The line closed in 1991 after the end of coal winning at Penallta Colliery.

== Barry Railway ==
In 1896 the Barry Railway began an invasion of the Rhymney Railway's territory. It had been opened with the object of providing competition for the mineral traffic of Cardiff Docks and the Taff Vale Railway, which together suffered from severe congestion, and in the view of their customers, high rates and poor service. The Barry founded new docks at Barry itself, and opened a line from the Rhondda to Barry in 1889.

On 7 August 1896 the Barry Railway got the Barry Railway Act 1896 (59 & 60 Vict. c. cxciii) for a Rhymney branch; it was to be a prodigious extension, running form a junction with its main line near St Fagans, turning northeast and crossing the River Taff near Taff's Well, following closely the original line of the Rhymney Railway to Penrhos Upper Junction, and then striking north and crossing the Rhymney valley to join the Brecon and Merthyr Railway.

The Barry Railway's Rhymney branch opened for freight traffic on 1 August 1901. The further line to cross the valley and join the B&M line was opened for goods and mineral traffic on 2 January 1905. Three years later, 1 1/4 million tons of coal were taken from the Rhymney system down to Barry.

The Barry Railway had asked for running powers over the Rhymney Railway and over the Taff Bargoed Joint line but these were refused, except for powers into Caerphilly station.

The Barry's new line opened for goods and mineral traffic on 1 August 1901, but in the meantime, on 25 July 1896, the Barry had returned to Parliament for even more ambitious powers: to continue the line from Penrhos Junction to join the Brecon and Merthyr Railway, by crossing the Rhymney Valley by a large viaduct at Pwll-y-pant.

This extension line opened for goods and mineral traffic on 2 January 1905.

== Railmotors ==
The Taff Vale Railway introduced what it called "motor cars" (that is, railmotors) in 1905. These were single coaches incorporating a small steam engine integrated with the coach. The intention was to enable station calls at low-cost structures in rural areas.

The Rhymney Railway observed the considerable success of the Taff Vale scheme, and in 1907 procured two such vehicles from Hudswell Clarke to its own design; the steam engine part was a small 0-4-0 tank engine with 3 ft 6 in (107 cm) wheels. The carriage part was supplied by Cravens. There were soon complaints of unsteady running, and a trailing axle was added to the locomotive unit, with 2 ft 9 in (84 cm) wheels.

Several small halts were put up to make use of these cars, but the vehicles were not a success; one was rebuilt in 1910, making a separate carriage and engine. The other was used until 1919 on the Penrhiwfelin workmen's train, and then modified in the same way as the other.

== Westinghouse brake ==
When the company incorporated a continuous brake into its train working, it adopted the Westinghouse brake for passenger trains. This was the only use of the Westinghouse system in Wales, except the North Wales Narrow Gauge Railways. However, for a long time the Eames non-continuous vacuum brake was used on many of the mineral engines.

== Cardiff Railway ==
The Bute Docks system wished to operate railways outside the dock area, where it had an extensive system, and it formed the Cardiff Railway for the purpose.

On 1 March 1911 the Cardiff Railway started to run a railmotor passenger service over their newly built line to Rhydyfelin. For this purpose the Rhymney station at Cardiff was used, together with 1 3/4 miles (2.8 km) of line as far as Heath South, at which point the Cardiff Railway trains reached their own system.

== After 1922 ==
Most of the railways of Great Britain were "grouped" in 1922–23, following the Railways Act 1922. They were formed into one or other of four new large companies, and in the area under consideration that was the Great Western Railway. The Rhymney Railway was a constituent of the new GWR.

This took place from January 1922, although the Amalgamation tribunal did not give assent until 25 March, this was the official date.

In the final year of operation a dividend of 9 per cent on the Ordinary shares was maintained, as it had been since 1916. The following are the figures for 1921:

Capital	issued	£2,403,707
Capital	expenditure	£2,416,203
Mileage	lines owned	38 mi 43 ch (62.02 km)
Mileage	share of joint lines	10 mi 12 ch (16.33 km)
Mileage	leased or worked	1 mi 39 ch (2.39 km)
Mileage	share of lines leased or worked jointly	70 ch (1.41 km)
Total single track including sidings		170 mi 78 ch (275.16 km)
Originating traffic	Passengers (including workmen)	4,733,471
Originating traffic	Merchandise	163,210 tons
Originating traffic	Coal and coke	2,448,950 tons
Originating traffic	Other minerals	119,991 tons
Originating traffic	Total goods and minerals	2,732,151 tons
Receipts and expenditure	Receipts	£875,286
Receipts and expenditure	Expenditure	£756,879
Receipts and expenditure	Net receipts	£118,407

== From 1948 ==
In 1948 the Great Western Railway was nationalised, in common with other main line railways in Great Britain.

For some years the mineral operation that had always been the primary business of the Rhymney Railway continued, but over later decades coal extraction in South Wales declined, steeply in the early 1980s.

At the same time local passenger operation increased in importance, notwithstanding substantial improvements to the road network in the valleys. The difficult road access to Cardiff itself, and general traffic congestion in the city, were advantageous to the Rhymney line, particularly as access from Caerphilly south was through the tunnel.

As of 2020 there is a frequent local passenger service on the Rhymney Railway's main line, from Rhymney to Cardiff Queen Street via Ystrad Mynach and Caerphilly.

Practically all freight operation on the system has disappeared; a very limited residual service to Cwmbargoed may still be in operation.

A new station called Lisvane and Thornhill was opened on 4 November 1986, replacing Cefn Onn Halt, a little-used golfing halt, which closed on 27 September.

The buildings of the former Cardiff Parade station were demolished in 1989.

The part of the original main line between Taff's Well and Caerphilly, informally referred to as "the Big Hill", was closed on 21 June 1982, although the last train was a special on 23 October 1982.

The Taff Bargoed branch had (at Nelson & Llancaiach station) the short Ocean Branch for Deep Navigation and Taff Merthyr collieries and Trelewis Drift mine, and in October 1983 the line between Cwmbargoed and Dowlais Furnace Top closed.

Trelewis closed in 1989 when British Coal invested in opencast operations at Cwmbargoed.

Deep Navigation Mine closed in March 1991 but removal of surface stock continued by rail until January 1992. In October 1992 Taff Merthyr colliery closed.

== Officers ==
Cornelius Lundie, from the outset of the line and for more than 40 years, was General Manager, Traffic Manager and Superintendent of the line. Upon his retirement in 1904, the Rhymney did a spring cleaning, which notably included the scrapping of his favourite engine, which he had been preserving for a number of years.

=== Locomotive superintendents ===
- Thomas Clements (1858–1862)
- Matthew Mordue (1862–1863)
- John Kendall (1863–1869)
- John Canty (1869–1884)
- Richard Jenkins (1884–1906)
- C. T. Hurry Riches (1906–1922)

C. T. Hurry Riches was the son of Tom Hurry Riches, Locomotive Superintendent of the Taff Vale Railway (1873–1910). Kendall had an unfortunately short career with the Rhymney, which was cut short when he visited the Brecon and Merthyr Railway on 10 June 1869. The locomotive, upon which Kendall was travelling, overturned at Maesycwmmer, killing him and his B&MR counterpart, J.T. Simpson.

== Locomotives ==
=== Early locomotives ===
The early locomotives were tender engines, whether for passenger or goods:

- 0-6-0 Vulcan Foundry 1857: inside frames; freight
- 2-4-0 Vulcan Foundry 1858, 1861: passenger locomotives
- 0-6-0 Kitson 1859-1868: double frames, outside cranks; freight
- 0-6-0 ST 1872 onwards: various builders. All Rhymney locomotives from then were of this type.
  - Notes taken from The Railway Magazine February 1923

=== Later locomotives ===
- Rhymney Railway A class 0-6-2T
- Rhymney Railway B class 0-6-0WT
- Rhymney Railway I class 0-6-0ST
- Rhymney Railway K class 0-6-2ST
- Rhymney Railway L class 2-4-2ST
- Rhymney Railway L1 class 0-6-2ST
- Rhymney Railway M class 0-6-2T
- Rhymney Railway P class 0-6-2T
- Rhymney Railway R class 0-6-2T
- Rhymney Railway S class 0-6-0T
- Rhymney Railway S1 class 0-6-0T

Several original Rhymney Railway coaches have survived into the present day. Coaches No.95 and 109 stand in private residence. An unidentified six-wheel brake also resides in storage with the National Museums & Galleries of Wales. Only one wagon, a goods van, is known to still exist today, stored at the National Museum of Wales.

No locomotives exist in current preservation.

== Topography ==
=== Main line ===
- Tredegar Nantybwch; MT&AR station; opened 1 March 1864; renamed Nantybwch 1868; closed 13 June 1960;
- Rhymney Bridge; Nantybwch and Rhymney Joint Railway station; opened 2 October 1871; closed for Joint line traffic 23 September 1953; completely closed 6 January 1958;
- Cemetery Road Halt; dates unknown
- Rhymney; opened 31 March 1858; still open;
- Pontlottyn; opened September 1859; still open;
- Pontlottyn Colliery Halt; opened 1 January 1916; closed by 1928
- Troedyrhiwfuch Halt; opened 1 April 1908; closed to public 1 January 1916;
- Tir-phil; opened 31 March 1858; still open;
- George Inn; opened May 1871; renamed Brithdir 1891; still open;
- Bargoed; opened 31 March 1858; still open;
- Gilfach Fargoed; opened April 1908; still open;
- Pengam; opened 31 March 1858; still open;
- Hengoed; opened 31 March 1858; renamed Hengoed & Maesycwmmer 1904; renamed Hengoed Low Level 1924; renamed Hengoed 1968; still open;
- Ystrad; opened 31 March 1858; renamed Ystrad Mynach 1891; still open;
- Llanbradach Colliery; unadvertised miners' platform; opened by 1928; closed before 1954;
- Llanbradach; opened 1 March 1893; still open;
- Energlyn & Churchill Park; opened 8 December 2013; still open;
- Pwll-y-Pant; opened May 1871; closed 1 March 1893;
- Energlyn Junction;
- Aber Junction;
- Beddau; opened April 1908; renamed Aber Junction 1926; renamed Aber 1968; still open;
- Caerphilly; opened 1 April 1871; still open;
- Cefn Onn Halt; opened October 1915; closed 29 September 1986;
- Lisvane & Thornhill; opened 4 November 1986; still open;
- Llanishen; opened 1 April 1871; still open;
- Heath (High Level); opened October 1915; still open;
- Cemetery; not in timetable; dates uncertain but in existence 1872; closed by 1898:
- Cardiff Crockherbtown; opened 1 April 1871; renamed Cardiff Parade 1924; closed 15 April 1928;
- Cardiff Adam Street; opened 31 March 1858 closed 1 April 1871;
- Cardiff Docks.

=== Deri line ===
- Deri Junction; end on junction with Brecon and Merthyr Railway;
- Darran and Deri; opened 1 September 1868; closed 31 December 1962;
- Groesfaen Colliery Platform; opened by September 1926; closed 31 December 1962; Unadvertised for miners
- Bargoed; above.

=== Old main line ===
- Aber Junction; above;
- Caerphilly; opened 31 March 1858; closed 1 April 1871;
- Beddau Loop Junction;
- Penrhos Junction;
- Walnut Tree Junction; convergence with Taff Vale Railway main line.

=== Senghenydd branch ===
- Senghenith; opened 1 February 1894; renamed Senghenydd 1904; closed 15 June 1964;
- Windsor Colliery Halt; opened 1943; closed 15 June 1964;
- Aber; opened 1 February 1894; renamed Abertridwr 1899; closed 15 June 1964;
- Penyrheol Halt; opened 1 February 1894; closed 15 June 1964;
- Aber Junction; above.

=== Taff Bargoed line ===
- Dowlais Cae Harris; opened 1 February 1876; closed 15 June 1964;
- Penydarren Colliery Halt; not advertised in timetable; open at least 1928 to 1954; one mile west of Cwm Bargoed;
- Cwm Bargoed; opened 1 February 1876; closed 15 June 1964;
- Nantyffin Colliery Halt; unadvertised; open 1928 to 1954;
- Bedlinog Colliery Halt; opened 1915; closed some time between 1928 and 1938;
- Bedlinog Colliery Junction; unadvertised; open 1897 to 1915 and 1938 to 1955;
- Bedlinog; opened 1 February 1876; closed 15 June 1964;
- Nantwen Colliery Halt; unadvertised: opened 1 February 1876; closed 1928?;
- Taff Merthyr Colliery Halt; opened by September 1928; closed 15 June 1964;
- Trelewis Halt; Taff Vale Extension line; opened 10 July 1911; closed 15 June 1964;
- Nelson and Llancaiach; Taff Vale Extension line; opened 1 July 1912; closed 15 June 1964;
- Llancaiach; Taff Vale Extension line; opened 11 January 1858; closed 1 July 1912;
- Penalltau Junction;
- Ystrad Mynach; above.

Kidner says that the Rhymney Railway had a Fochriw Miners' Platform; this must have been at the colliery on the branch line.

=== Quakers Yard & Merthyr Joint Line ===
- [Merthyr Tydfil; GWR (Vale of Neath) station];
- [Rhymney Merthyr Junction; divergence of Vale of Neath line];
- [Abercanaid Junction; convergence of triangle spur from Vale of Neath line];
- Abercanaid; opened 1 April 1886; renamed Abercanaid & Pentrebach 1913; renamed Abercanaid 1924; closed 12 February 1951;
- Gethin Pits Platform; miners' platform, in use between 1915 and 1928;
- Castle Pit Platform; workmen only; in use between 1897 and 1915
- Troed-y-rhiw; opened 18 February 1907; renamed Troed-y-rhiw Halt 1924; closed 12 February 1951; remained open for miners until 1 November 1954;
- Aberfan; opened 1 April 1886; closed 12 February 1951;
- Merthyr Vale Miners Platform; at junction with branch to collieries;
- Pontygwaith Halt (GWR); opened 11 September 1933; closed 12 February 1951;
- [Quakers Yard; Taff Vale Extension line station; opened 5 October 1864; Quakers Yard High Level from the 1890s; closed 15 June 1964].
