= Cardiff Crockherbtown railway station =

Disused railway station in Wales

Coordinates: 51.484094°N 3.170840°W

Cardiff Crockherbtown
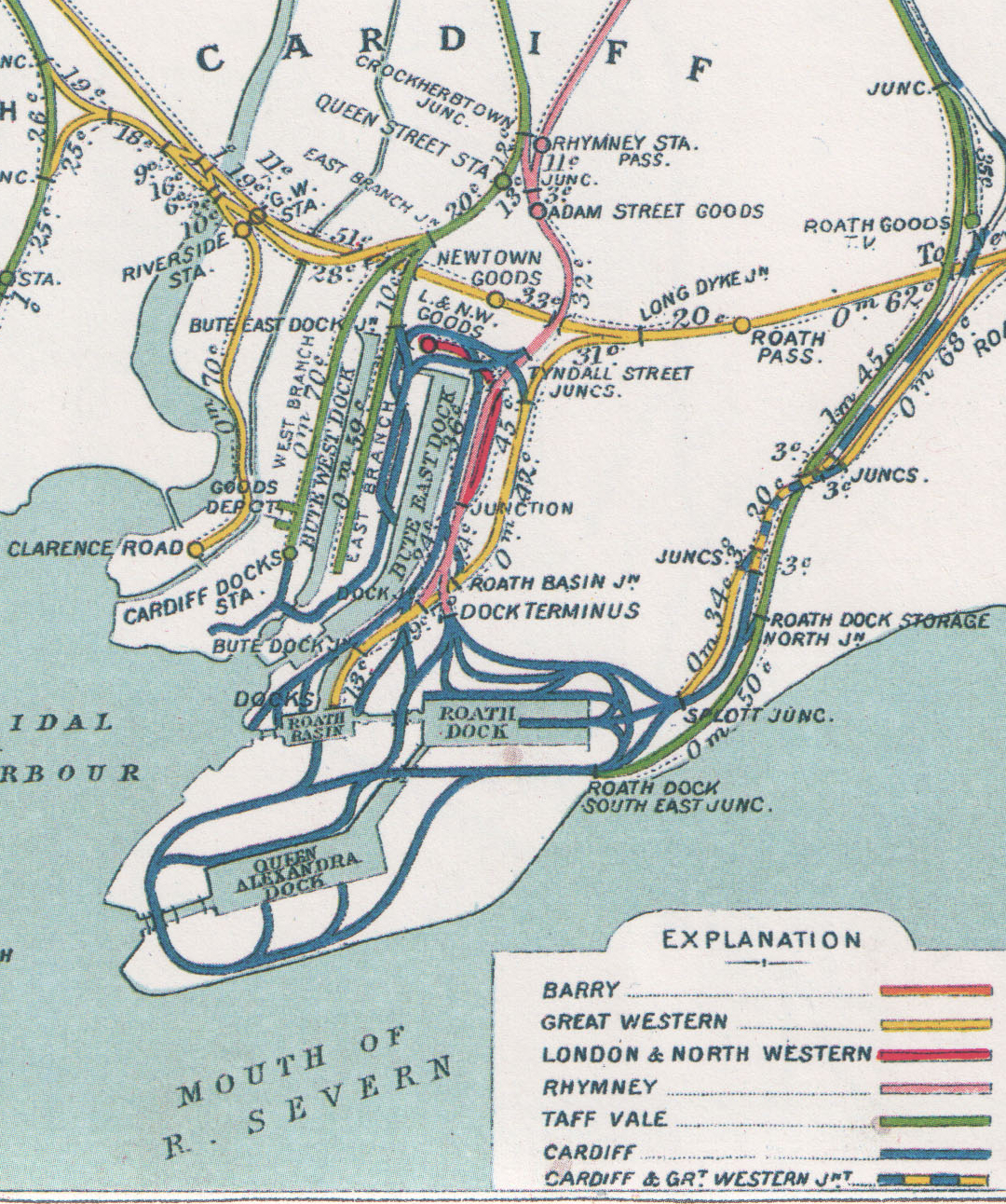
- 1911 map of railways in central Cardiff, Rhymney (as it was then known) station is upper centre in pink.

General information
- Location: Wales
- Platforms: 3

Other information
- Status: Disused

History
- Pre-grouping: Rhymney Railway
- Post-grouping: Great Western Railway

Key dates
- 1 April 1871: Opened as Crockherbtown
- 1888: Renamed Cardiff (Rhymney)
- 1924: Renamed Cardiff Parade
- 15 April 1928: Closed
Location

Cardiff Crockherbtown was a railway station in the area then known as Crockherbtown in central Cardiff, and was the main Cardiff station of the Rhymney Railway. It was opened on 1 April 1871 when the Rhymney Railway opened its own route into Cardiff from Caerphilly, it replaced the nearby Adam Street station, and consisted of two through platforms and a bay. The station was built a short distance north-east of Cardiff Queen Street station of the Taff Vale Railway. In 1888 the station was renamed Cardiff (Rhymney). Passenger returns from 1920 show that 800,000 passengers were using the station per annum. In 1922, the Rhymney Railway and Taff Vale Railways became part of the Great Western Railway (GWR), and in 1924 the station was renamed again to Cardiff Parade.

As both the Rhymney and Taff Vale companies were under unified ownership and there was no longer any rivalry, or need for two stations in close proximity, on 15 April 1928 the GWR opened a new connection south of the station connecting the Rhymney Railway to the former Taff Vale Railway, this allowed Parade station to be closed, and all of its services diverted into an enlarged Cardiff Queen Street station. The final remains of Parade station were demolished in 1989.
