= Ystrad Mynach railway station =

Railway station in Caerphilly, Wales

Ystrad Mynach
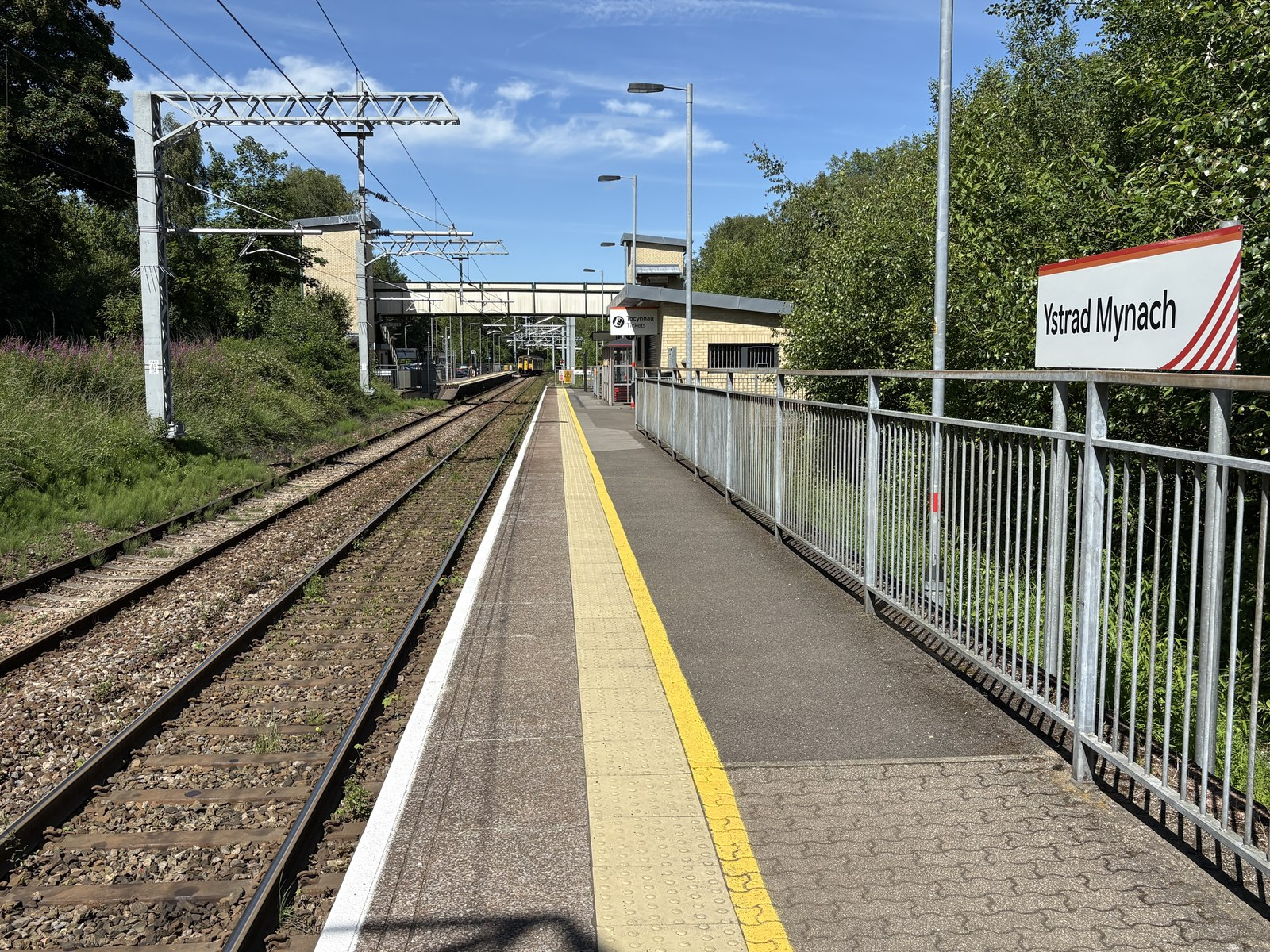

General information
- Location: Ystrad Mynach, Caerphilly; Wales
- Coordinates: 51°38′27″N 3°14′30″W
- Grid reference: ST141942
- Manager: Transport for Wales
- Platforms: 2

Other information
- Station code: YSM
- Classification: DfT category E

History
- Opened: 1858

Passengers
- 2021/22: ▲0.136 million
- 2022/23: ▲0.199 million
- 2023/24: ▲0.234 million
- 2024/25: ▼0.222 million
- 2025/26: ▼0.153 million
Location
Notes
- Passenger statistics from the Office of Rail and Road

Ystrad Mynach railway station is a railway station serving the town of Ystrad Mynach, south Wales. It is a stop on the Rhymney Line of the Valley Lines network.

The nearest bus interchange is Blackwood Interchange, 4 miles (6.4 km) away. From 2020, the rail linc bus (901) that links with the train no longer operated. It operated to Maesycwmmer, Pontllanfraith, and ended at Blackwood.

== History ==
Ystrad Mynach railway station was on the Rhymney Railway opened in 1858. It consisted of staggered platforms on the main line, as well as a separate platform on the Dowlais line. Nearby Penallta Junction gave access to the Great Western Railway and the Aberdare Valley, opened 1 April 1871 and the Cylla branch opened on 1 August 1906 to access the new Powell Duffryn owned Penallta Colliery. The latter line closed in 1991 and has since been lifted, but the former is still in use (for freight only) as far as Cwmbargoed to serve the coal washery and associated opencast mine at Ffos-Y-Fran. Coal from there is sent to Aberthaw Power Station in bulk trainloads.

In 2014, the station underwent a £1.6 million refurbishment with new ticket machines, waiting areas and ticket office, with disabled toilet being installed in addition to major work carried out on the footbridge with lifts being installed to improve accessibility.

The northbound platform is signalled for use in both directions, to permit trains from Cardiff to terminate & start back from there.

Ystrad Mynach railway station was used as a location in the pilot episode of Porridge (Prisoner and Escort), part of the series Seven of One, starring Ronnie Barker.

== Service ==
The station has a frequent weekday service in both directions - northbound there are four trains each hour to Bargoed (one service terminates here during the autumn leaf fall period), with hourly extensions to Rhymney (extras at peak times) on Mondays to Saturday daytimes, whilst southbound there are four trains per hour to Cardiff Central and Penarth. In the evening, there was an hourly service to Rhymney & Cardiff/Penarth and on Sundays there is a two-hourly service each way, with southbound trains running to Barry Island. These services were operated before the June 2024 time table change.

After the June 2024 timetable change, the Monday to Saturday train service is four trains per hour south to Cardiff Central. The xx25, xx36 and xx55 service continues to Barry Island but the xx06 service continues to Bridgend. Northwards there are also four trains per hour - two terminating at Bargoed (which is the xx25 and the xx55 service from Barry Island) and two trains per hour continuing to Rhymney (which is the xx13 from Bridgend and the xx44 from Barry Island) In the evenings from 8pm every Monday to Saturday, the train service will run two trains per hour, one train will continue to Bridgend and the other train will continue to Barry island. On Sundays, the train service will run hourly between Rhymney and Barry Island.

These services have now been operating from Rhymney/Bargoed to Barry Island/Bridgend since June 2024. It has increase the number of trains from one to two trains per hour that continues up to Rhymney every Monday to Saturday.

The Class 231, Class 150 and Class 153 trains operates to Barry Island and the Class 150 and Class 153 trains operates to Bridgend.

Preceding station	National Rail	Following station
Llanbradach	Transport for Wales; Rhymney Line	Hengoed
