= Abercanaid railway station =

Disused railway station in Abercanaid, Merthyr Tydfil

Coordinates: 51.72517°N 3.37333°W

Abercanaid

General information
- Location: Abercanaid, Merthyr Tydfil; Wales
- Platforms: 2

Other information
- Status: Disused

History
- Original company: Quakers Yard and Merthyr Railway
- Pre-grouping: Quakers Yard and Merthyr Railway
- Post-grouping: Great Western Railway

Key dates
- 1 April 1886: Station opens
- 9 September 1913: Station renamed Abercanaid and Pentrebach
- 1 July 1924: Station renamed Abercanaid
- 12 February 1951: Station closes
Location

Abercanaid railway station served the village of Abercanaid, near Merthyr Tydfil in Wales. Opened by the Quakers Yard & Merthyr Railway, a joint Great Western Railway / Rhymney Railway Joint operation, it became part of the Great Western Railway during the Grouping of 1923. Passing on to the Western Region of British Railways on nationalisation in 1948, it was closed by them three years later.

== The site today ==
The site is now on the route of the Taff Trail. Abercanaid is served by the Valley Lines station at Pentre-bach, across the river.

Preceding station	Disused railways	Following station
Gethin Pit Platform	Great Western Railway; Quakers Yard and Merthyr Railway	Merthyr Tydfil High Street
