= Aberfan railway station =

Disused railway station in Aberfan, Wales

Coordinates: 51.68918°N 3.34423°W

Aberfan

General information
- Location: Aberfan, Merthyr Tydfil; Wales
- Platforms: 2

Other information
- Status: Disused

History
- Original company: Quakers Yard and Merthyr Railway
- Pre-grouping: Quakers Yard and Merthyr Railway
- Post-grouping: Great Western Railway

Key dates
- 1 April 1886: Station opens
- January 1902: Station renamed Aberfan for Merthyr Vale
- by July 1932: Station renamed Aberfan
- 12 February 1951: Station closes to passengers
- 1 November 1954: closed completely
Location

Aberfan railway station served the village of Aberfan, near Merthyr Tydfil in Wales. Opened by the Quakers Yard & Merthyr Railway, a joint Great Western Railway / Rhymney Railway Joint operation, it became part of the Great Western Railway during the Grouping of 1923. Passing on to the Western Region of British Railways on nationalisation in 1948, it was closed to passengers in 1951.

== The site today ==
The railway station now has a new housing estate built on it in 2018

The site is now on the route of the Taff Trail. Aberfan is served by the Valley Lines station at Merthyr Vale, across the river.

Preceding station	Disused railways	Following station
Troed-y-Rhiw Halt	Great Western Railway; Quakers Yard and Merthyr Railway	Merthyr Vale Miners Platform
