= Lisvane and Thornhill railway station =

Railway station in Cardiff, Wales

Lisvane and Thornhill Welsh: Llys-faen a Draenen Pen-y-Graig
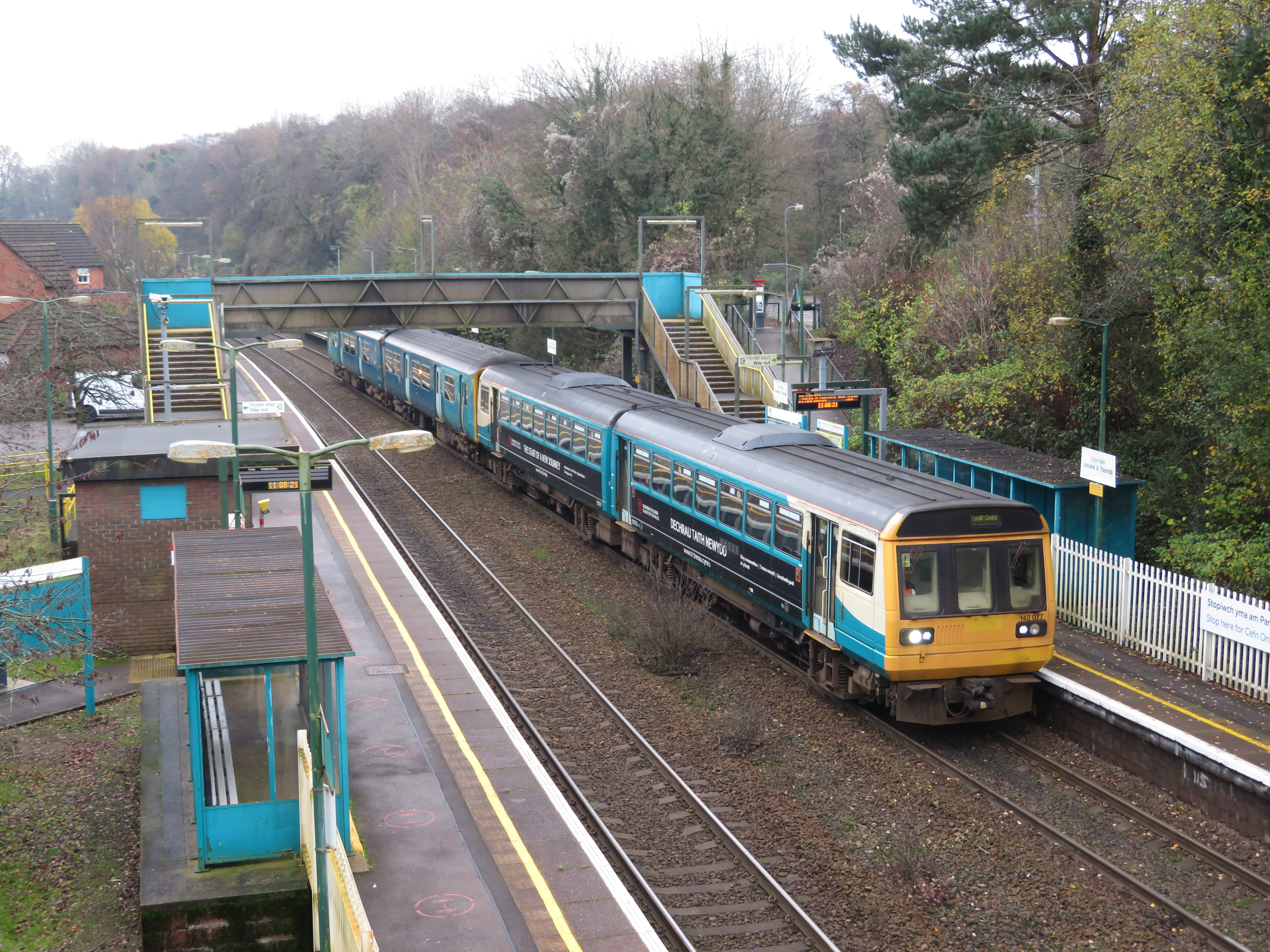

General information
- Location: Lisvane, Cardiff; Wales
- Coordinates: 51°32′40″N 3°11′08″W
- Grid reference: ST178834
- Managed by: Transport for Wales
- Platforms: 2

Other information
- Station code: LVT
- Classification: DfT category F2

History
- Opened: 1985

Passengers
- 2020/21: ▼19,928
- 2021/22: ▲91,386
- 2022/23: ▲0.143 million
- 2023/24: ▲0.190 million
- 2024/25: ▲0.241 million
Location
Notes
- Passenger statistics from the Office of Rail and Road

Lisvane and Thornhill railway station (Welsh: Llys-faen a Draenen Pen-y-Graig) is a railway station serving the Lisvane and Thornhill areas of north Cardiff, Wales. It is a stop on the Rhymney Line of the Valley Lines network.

This station replaced Cefn Onn Halt railway station, which was closed in 1986.

== Services ==
The Monday to Saturday daytime service pattern is six trains an hour southbound to Cardiff Central: two continue to Penarth, three to Barry Island and one to Bridgend. Northbound six trains an hour run to Caerphilly, with four continuing to Bargoed and two of those going on to Rhymney. The frequency decreases in the evening.

On Sundays, the service pattern is two trains an hour southbound to Cardiff Central and Barry Island, and two an hour northbound to Caerphilly, with one continuing to Rhymney.

Services are operated by Class 150, Class 153 and Class 231 trains.

Preceding station	National Rail	Following station
Llanishen	Transport for Wales; Rhymney Line	Caerphilly

== History ==
The station was officially opened on 4 November 1985 by the Chairman of South Glamorgan County Council, County Councillor Kenneth Hutchings. It was constructed at a cost of £182,000, jointly financed by South Glamorgan County Council and British Rail, with the help of a grant from the European Regional Development Fund. The station, which is situated on the northern outskirts of Cardiff, 4.5 miles (7.2 km) from Queen Street, was hoped to generate at least 900 passenger journeys per day, both inbound and outbound. An 80-space County Council park-and-ride car park was constructed alongside the station.

== See also ==
- List of railway stations in Cardiff
- Rail transport in Cardiff
