= Dowlais Cae Harris railway station =

Disused railway station in Dowlais, Merthyr Tydfil

Coordinates: 51.7622°N 3.3451°W

Dowlais Cae Harris

General information
- Location: Dowlais, Glamorgan; Wales
- Platforms: 2

Other information
- Status: Disused

History
- Original company: Rhymney Railway
- Pre-grouping: Rhymney Railway
- Post-grouping: Great Western Railway

Key dates
- 1 February 1867: Opened
- 15 June 1964: Closed
Location

Dowlais Cae Harris railway station served the village of Dowlais, Glamorgan, Wales, from 1867 to 1964 on the Rhymney Railway.

== History ==
The station opened on 1 February 1867 by the Rhymney Railway. It was situated behind the Antelope Hotel, which is still extant today. The station closed on 15 June 1964. The station was demolished after closure and the site is now a car park.

On 18 November 1911, a light engine under the control of a 17-year-old engine cleaner passed a signal at danger while being shunted and fouled an adjacent line on which a colliery worker's train was arriving. Multiple passengers, who were standing on the carriage footboards where crushed between the trains or swept off, killing two and injuring three. The report into the accident placed the primary responsibility on the cleaner in charge of the light engine but laid significant responsibility also at the hands of the driver who asked him to move the locomotive and the general working practices of the company, particularly with regard inadequate supervision of junior staff. The inadequate station layout, inadequate signalling arrangements, lack of trap points and poor working practices also received criticism.

Preceding station	Disused railways	Following station
Terminus	Rhymney Railway	Cwm Bargoed; Line and station closed
