= Rhymney Railway S class =

Steam locomotive

Rhymney Railway S and S1 classes
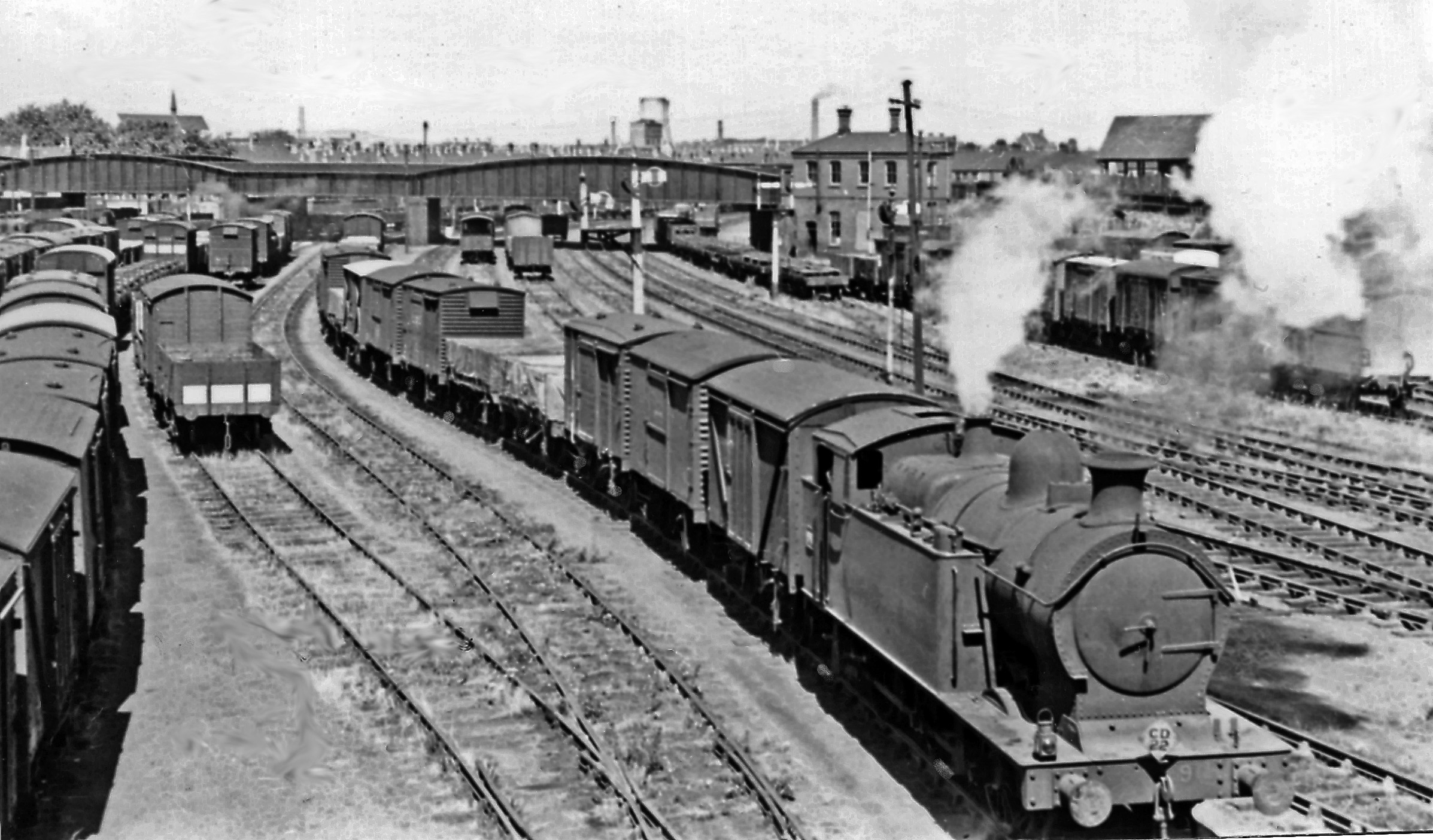
- Class S1 0-6-0T No. at Cardiff 1950
Type and origin
- Power type: Steam
- Designer: C. T. Hurry Riches
- Build date: 1908–1920
- Total produced: 7 4(S), 3(S1)
Specifications
- Configuration
  - Whyte: 0-6-0T
- Gauge: 4 ft 8 1/2 in (1,435 mm) standard gauge
- Driver dia.: 4 ft 6 in (1.372 m)
- Loco weight: S 55.06–66.95 long tons (55.94–68.02 t); S1 56.08–66.95 long tons (56.98–68.02 t)
- Fuel type: Coal
- Boiler pressure: 175 lbf/in^{2} (1.21 MPa); Rebuilt: 200 lbf/in^{2} (1.38 MPa)
- Cylinders: Two, inside
- Cylinder size: 18 in × 26 in (457 mm × 660 mm)
Performance figures
- Tractive effort: S 23,870 lbf (106.2 kN); S1: 25,210 lbf (112.1 kN)
Career
- Operators: RR, GWR, BR
- Class: RR: S & S1
- Power class: BR: 4F
- Numbers: RR: 32-4, 111–4; GWR/BR: 78-83
- Withdrawn: 1954–5
- Disposition: All scrapped

The Rhymney Railway S class was a class of 0-6-0T steam locomotives introduced into traffic in 1908 designed by the railway's engineer Hurry Riches. There were initially four locos in the class. A further 4 ‘S1’ locomotives with a larger boiler and higher tractive effort were built in 1920.
