= Bedlinog railway station =

Disused railway station in Bedlinog, Merthyr Tydfil

Bedlinog
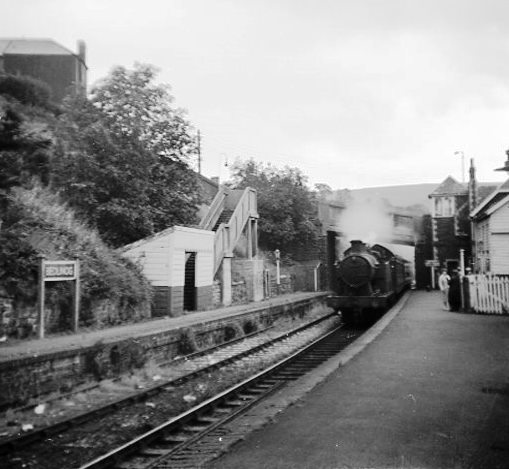
- The station in 1963

General information
- Location: Bedlinog, Glamorgan; Wales
- Coordinates: 51.7024°N 3.3124°W
- Grid reference: SO092014
- Platforms: 2

Other information
- Status: Disused

History
- Original company: Rhymney Railway
- Pre-grouping: Rhymney Railway
- Post-grouping: Great Western Railway

Key dates
- 1 February 1876: Opened
- 15 June 1964: Closed
Location

Bedlinog railway station served the village of Bedlinog in the historic county of Glamorgan, Wales, from 1876 to 1964 on the Rhymney Railway.

== History ==
The station opened on 1 February 1876 by the Rhymney Railway. It was situated to the south west of Rodw Road. It closed on 15 June 1964.

Preceding station	Historical railways	Following station
Cwm Bargoed; Line open, station closed	Rhymney Railway	Taff Merthyr Colliery Halt; Line open, station closed
