= Cwm Bargoed railway station =

Disused railway station in Fochriw, Caerphilly

Cwm Bargoed
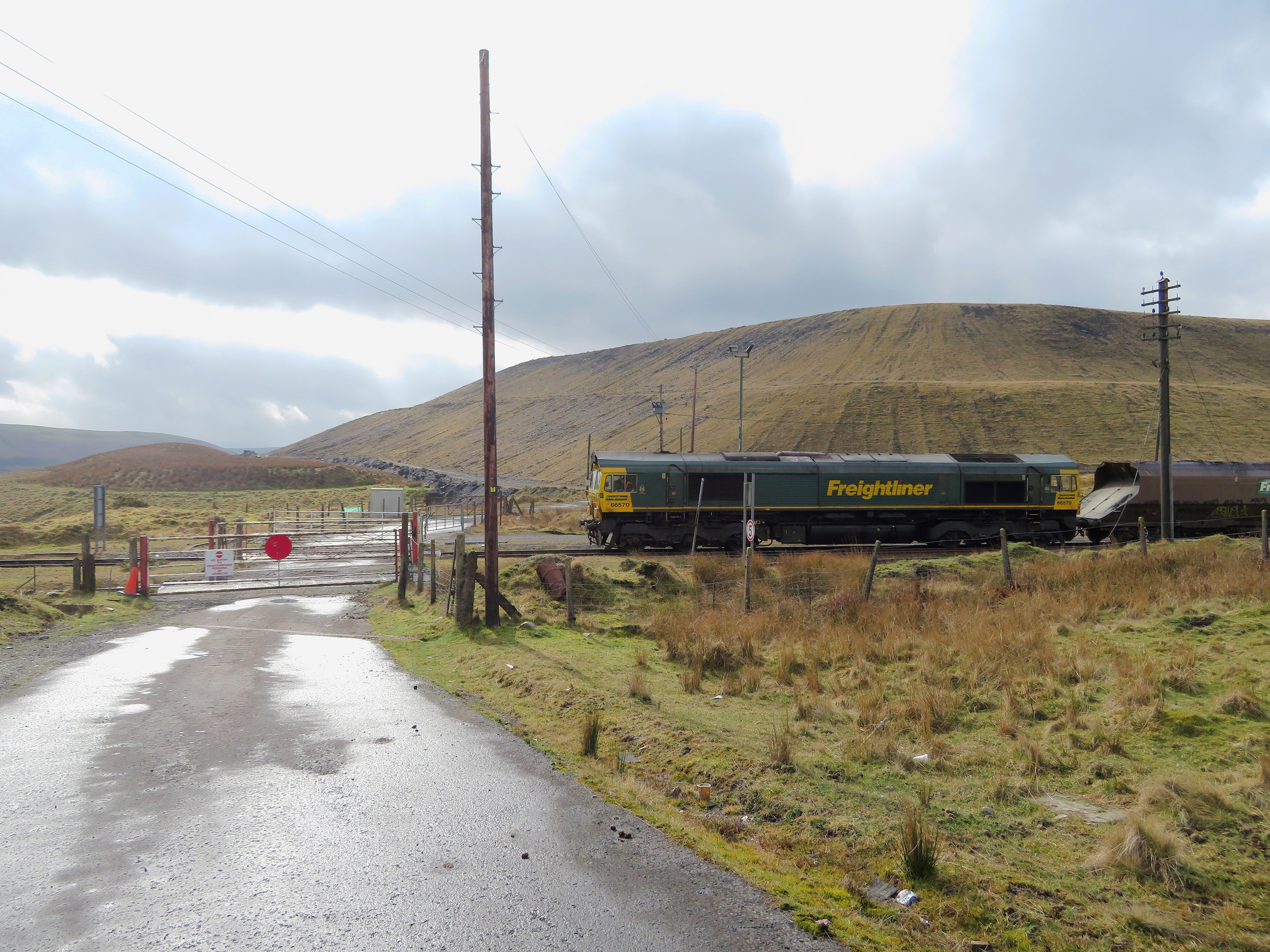
- The level crossing near the station in 2019

General information
- Location: Fochriw, Caerphilly; Wales
- Coordinates: 51.7461°N 3.3221°W
- Grid reference: SO088060
- Platforms: 2

Other information
- Status: Disused

History
- Original company: Rhymney Railway
- Pre-grouping: Rhymney Railway
- Post-grouping: Great Western Railway

Key dates
- 1 February 1876: Opened
- 15 June 1964: Closed
Location

Cwm Bargoed railway station was near the village of Fochriw, (Note: Fochriw had its own railway station at this time.) in the Taff Bargoed valley of Caerphilly County Borough, Wales, from 1876 to 1964 on the Rhymney Railway. The station was 4 km (2.5 mi) east of Merthyr Tydfil, but was in a parallel valley.

== History ==
The station opened on 1 February 1876 by the Rhymney Railway. Nearby were various mines, which was situated on a mineral branch, and Cwm Bargoed Colliery. By the end of 1924, the colliery and most of the mines had closed. The mineral line closed in 1937, most of the remains being lost in the Cwm Bargoed Washery. The station closed on 15 June 1964. The tracks still remain, which are used to transport coal from the Ffos-y-fran Land Reclamation Scheme.

Preceding station	Historical railways	Following station
Dowlais Cae Harris; Line and station closed	Rhymney Railway	Bedlinog; Line open, station closed
