= Cefn Onn Halt railway station =

Disused railway station in Wales

Coordinates: 51.55027°N 3.18471°W

Cefn Onn Halt
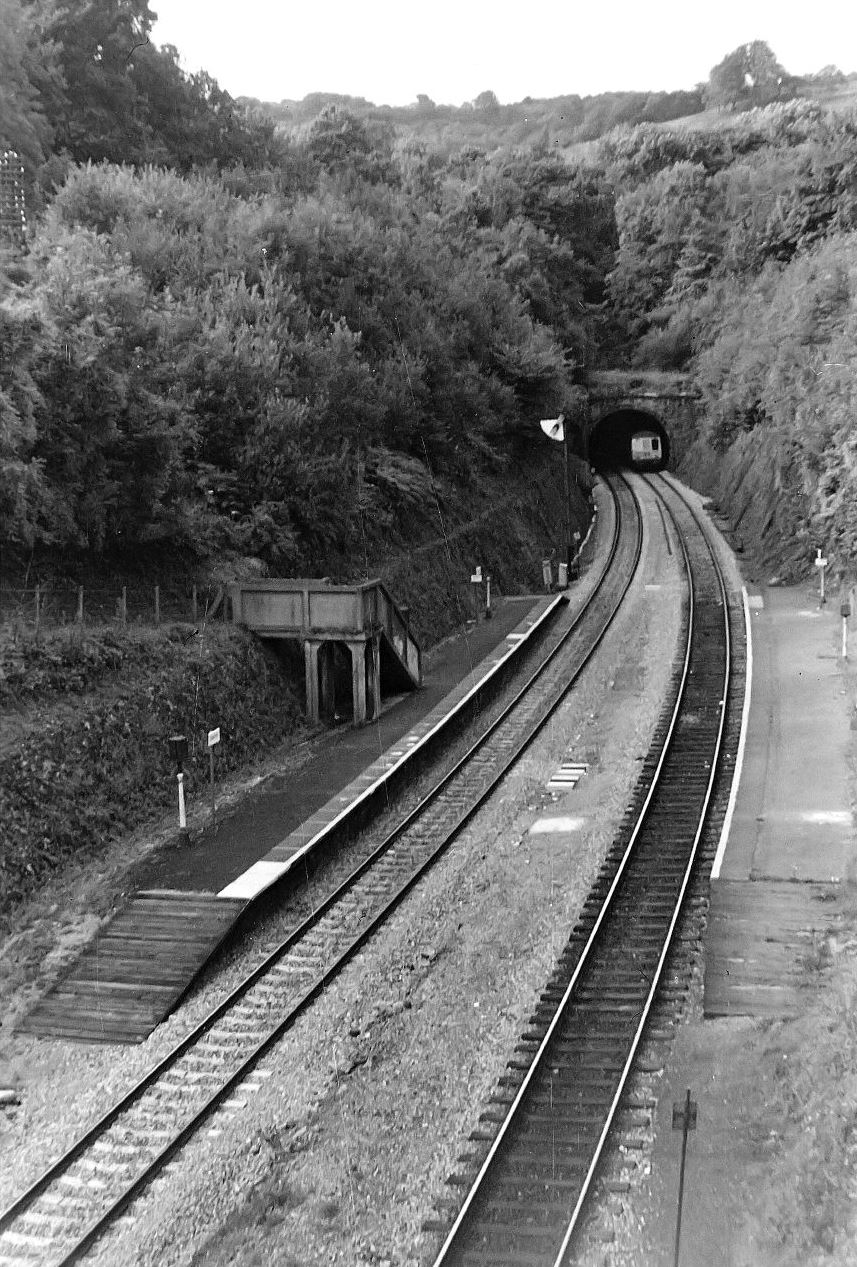
- Station in 1973.

General information
- Location: Lisvane, Cardiff; Wales
- Platforms: 2

Other information
- Status: Disused

History
- Original company: Rhymney Railway

Key dates
- 1915: opened
- 1986: closed
Location

Cefn Onn Halt railway station was a halt on the Rhymney line between Cardiff and Rhymney, Wales. It was opened in 1915 but closed on 27 September 1986 and was replaced by Lisvane and Thornhill, a short distance to the south. The station was close to the entrance of Caerphilly Tunnel.

The station was adjacent to and served Cefn Onn Park (now known as Parc Cefn Onn), which was laid out from 1911 to 1933 by Ernest Prosser, a director of the Rhymney Railway, which owned the line. The park was bought in 1944 by Cardiff County Borough Council, which developed it as a country park. The park is now listed at Grade II on the Cadw/ICOMOS Register of Parks and Gardens of Special Historic Interest in Wales.

== Today ==
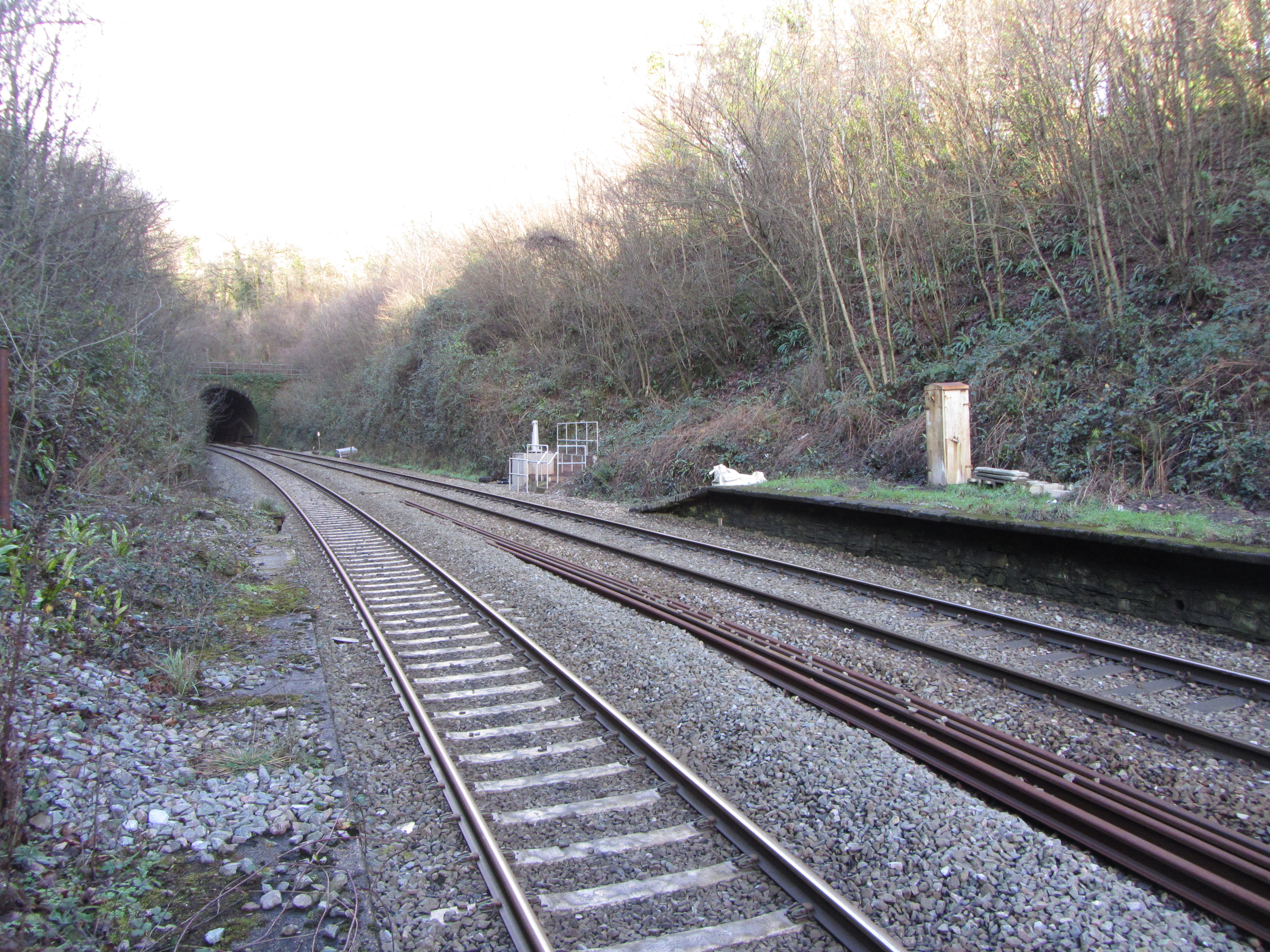
The disused Cefn Onn Halt, looking north in 2013

Both of the platforms remain. The Up shaped tower remains, along with the mile post indicating 6 miles to Cardiff. The bridge connecting the two platforms was removed in 1999.
