= Caerphilly railway station =

Railway station in Caerphilly, Wales

Caerphilly Welsh: Caerffili
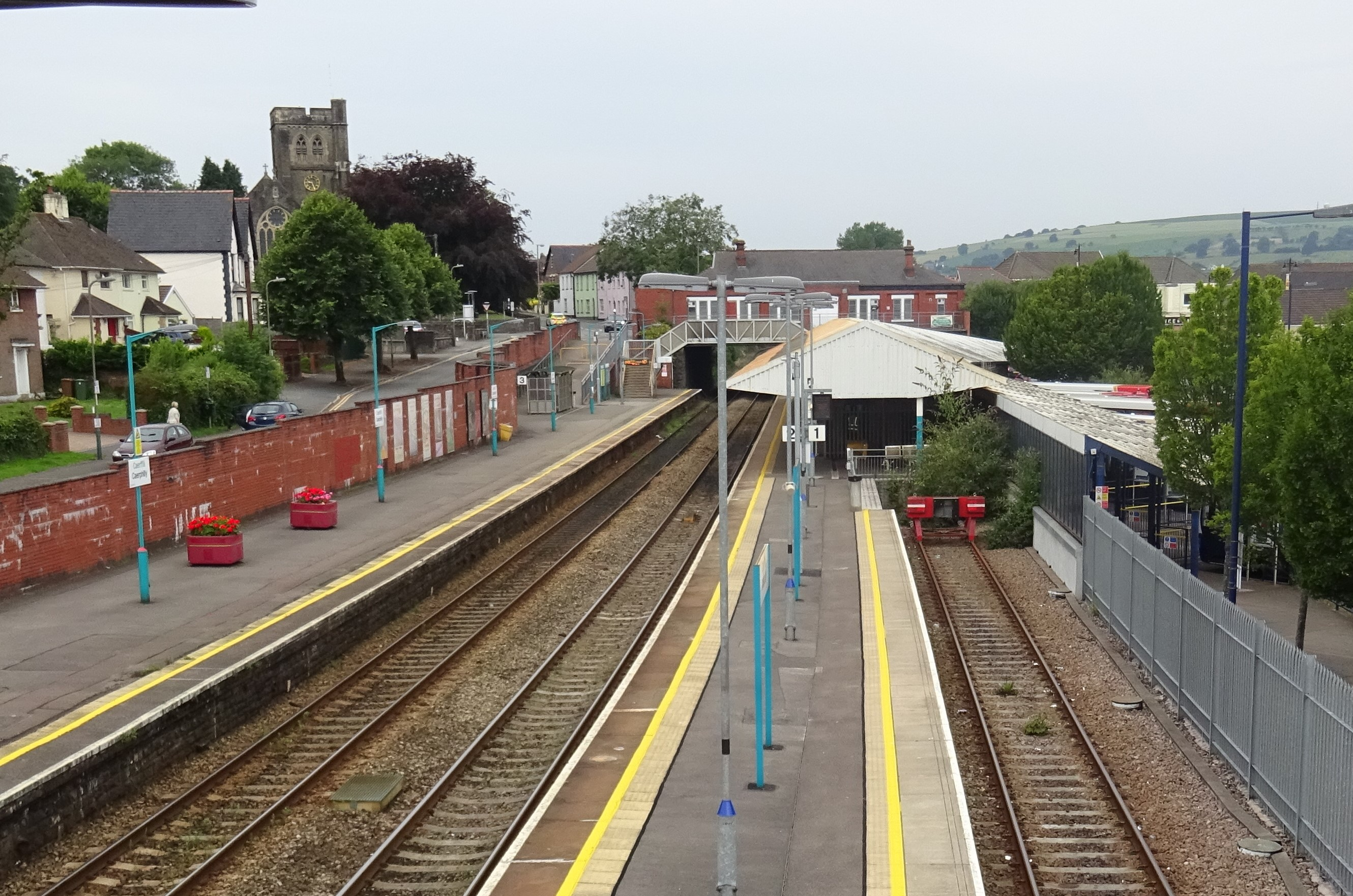
- Caerphilly railway station in 2019

General information
- Location: Caerphilly, Caerphilly; Wales
- Coordinates: 51.5715°N 3.2186°W
- Grid reference: ST156865
- Manager: Transport for Wales
- Platforms: 3

Other information
- Station code: CPH
- Classification: DfT category D

History
- Original company: Rhymney Railway
- Pre-grouping: Rhymney Railway
- Post-grouping: Great Western Railway

Key dates
- 31 March 1858: Opened
- 1 April 1871: Re-sited

Passengers
- 2021/22: ▲0.373 million
- 2022/23: ▲0.525 million
- 2023/24: ▲0.569 million
- 2024/25: ▲0.623 million
- 2025/26: ▲0.805 million
Location
Notes
- Passenger statistics from the Office of Rail and Road

Caerphilly railway station (Welsh: Gorsaf reilffordd Caerffili) is a railway station serving the town of Caerphilly, south Wales. It is a stop on the Rhymney Line of the Valley Lines network. The station is located at Station Road in the south of the town. Facilities include a small shop and a ticket kiosk. A self-service ticket machine was installed near the entrance to the station on 22 December 2008. Several advertising murals depicting holiday travel in various parts of South Wales have been placed on the northbound side of the station in order to improve the 'look' of the station.

== History ==
The first Caerphilly station was on the now-disappeared Taffs Well to Ystrad line. It opened in 1858 and closed in 1871 when the current railway alignment and station opened. The first station was around 250 metres from the current Aber station but on a completely different alignment.

The current station was built in 1871 as part of the Rhymney Railway. It ended up as a four way junction:

- To the west at Penrhos junction (on the line from Aber Junction to Walnut Tree Junction) with the Pontypridd, Caerphilly and Newport Railway
- To the east through a tunnel to a junction with the Brecon and Merthyr Railway at Machen, and onwards to Newport Docks

As a result of traffic volume, the station was rebuilt in 1913 to four platforms and a west facing bay platform.

Caerphilly was the terminus of the Rhymney Line from Penarth from 5 September 2008 to 19 September 2008 due to a landslip that blocked the line near Llanbradach railway station due to the poor weather conditions. Replacement bus services operated the route between Caerphilly and Bargoed/Rhymney. Train services subsequently resumed as normal.

== Present form ==
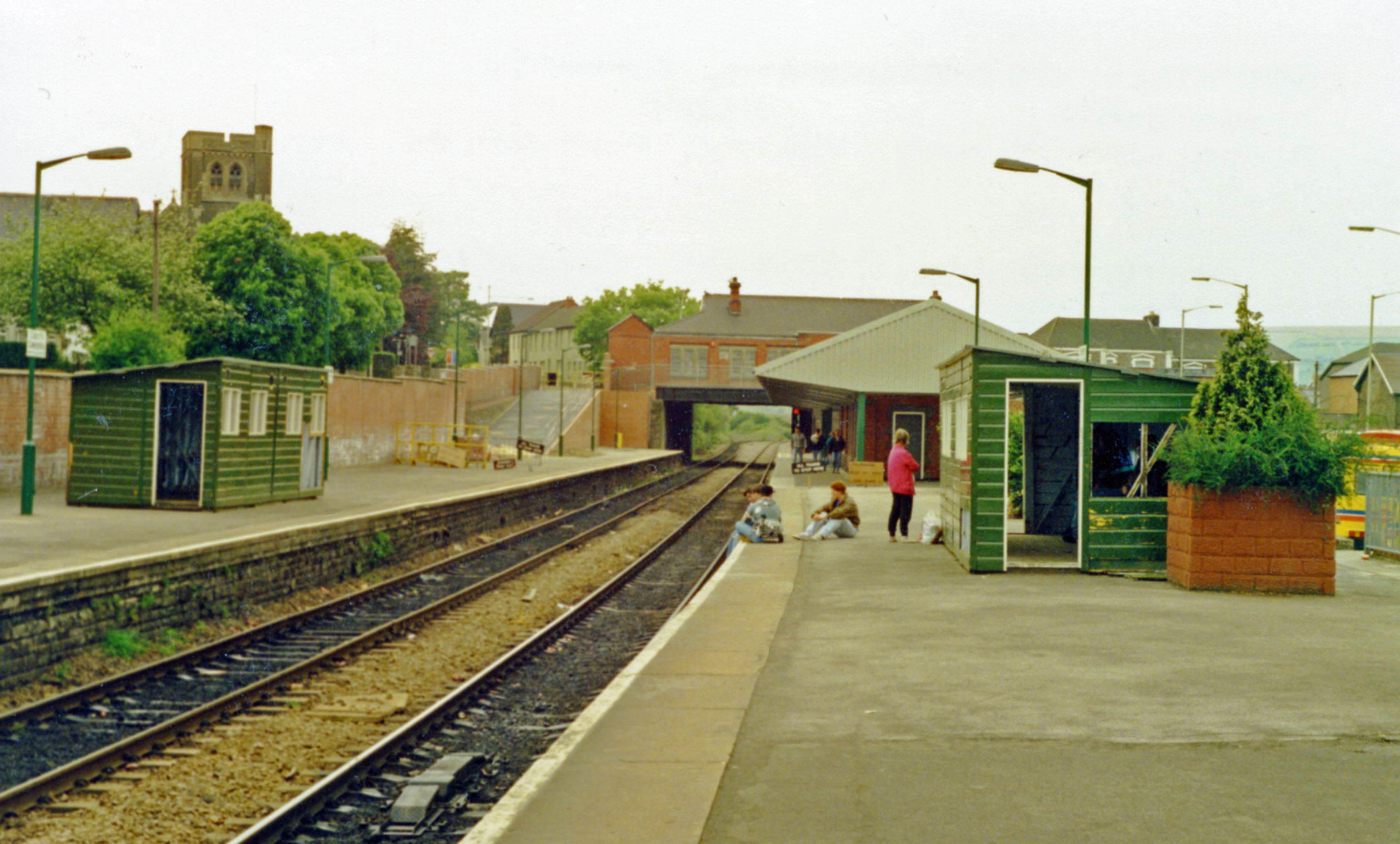
The station in 1990

With the closure of both junctions and the simplification of the railway to a pure through service as part of the Rhymney Line, the station was rebuilt to a two platform with bus interchange in 1970. The signalling system is currently set up to allow northbound services to terminate in the southbound platform (using a facing crossover) & return directly to Cardiff if required, although this facility is only used during the evenings in the current (May 2013) timetable. The ongoing Valley Lines resignalling scheme will see a new bay platform bought into use at the station for use by terminating trains, which will allow a further increase in service frequencies to/from Cardiff in the future. Plans to develop the station as a transport hub, including a bus interchange, were announced by Caerphilly County Borough Council in October 2022.

== Services ==
The Monday to Saturday daytime service pattern is six trains an hour southbound to Cardiff Central: two continue to Penarth, three to Barry Island and one to Bridgend. Northbound four trains an hour run to Bargoed with two of those continuing to Rhymney. The frequency decreases in the evening.

On Sundays, the service pattern is two trains an hour southbound to Cardiff Central and Barry Island, and one an hour northbound to Rhymney.

Preceding station	National Rail	Following station
Lisvane and Thornhill	Transport for Wales; Rhymney Line	Aber
	Historical railways	
Aber; Line and station open	Rhymney Railway; Main line	Cefn Onn Halt; Line open, station closed
	Disused railways	
Terminus	Brecon and Merthyr Tydfil Junction Railway; Pontypridd, Caerphilly and Newport Railway	Gwernydomen Halt; Line and station closed
Nantgarw (High Level) Halt; Line and station closed	Great Western Railway; Pontypridd, Caerphilly and Newport Railway	Terminus
