= Adam Street railway station =

Disused railway station in Cardiff, Wales

Coordinates: 51.482249°N 3.167775°W

Adam Street

General information
- Location: Wales

Other information
- Status: Disused

History
- Original company: Rhymney Railway

Key dates
- 31 March 1858: Opened
- 1 April 1871: Station closed to passengers
- 2 May 1966: Station closed to goods
Location

Adam Street railway station, was a railway station in Cardiff, and was one of the original termini of the Rhymney Railway, it was opened on 31 March 1858, but was closed to passengers on 1 April 1871, being replaced by the nearby Cardiff Crockherbtown railway station when the Rhymney Railway opened its own route into Cardiff. It remained open as a goods station until 2 May 1966.
