= Quakers Yard and Merthyr Railway =

Railway in South Wales

The Quakers Yard and Merthyr Railway in South Wales was owned jointly by the Great Western Railway and the Rhymney Railway.

== History ==
=== Route ===
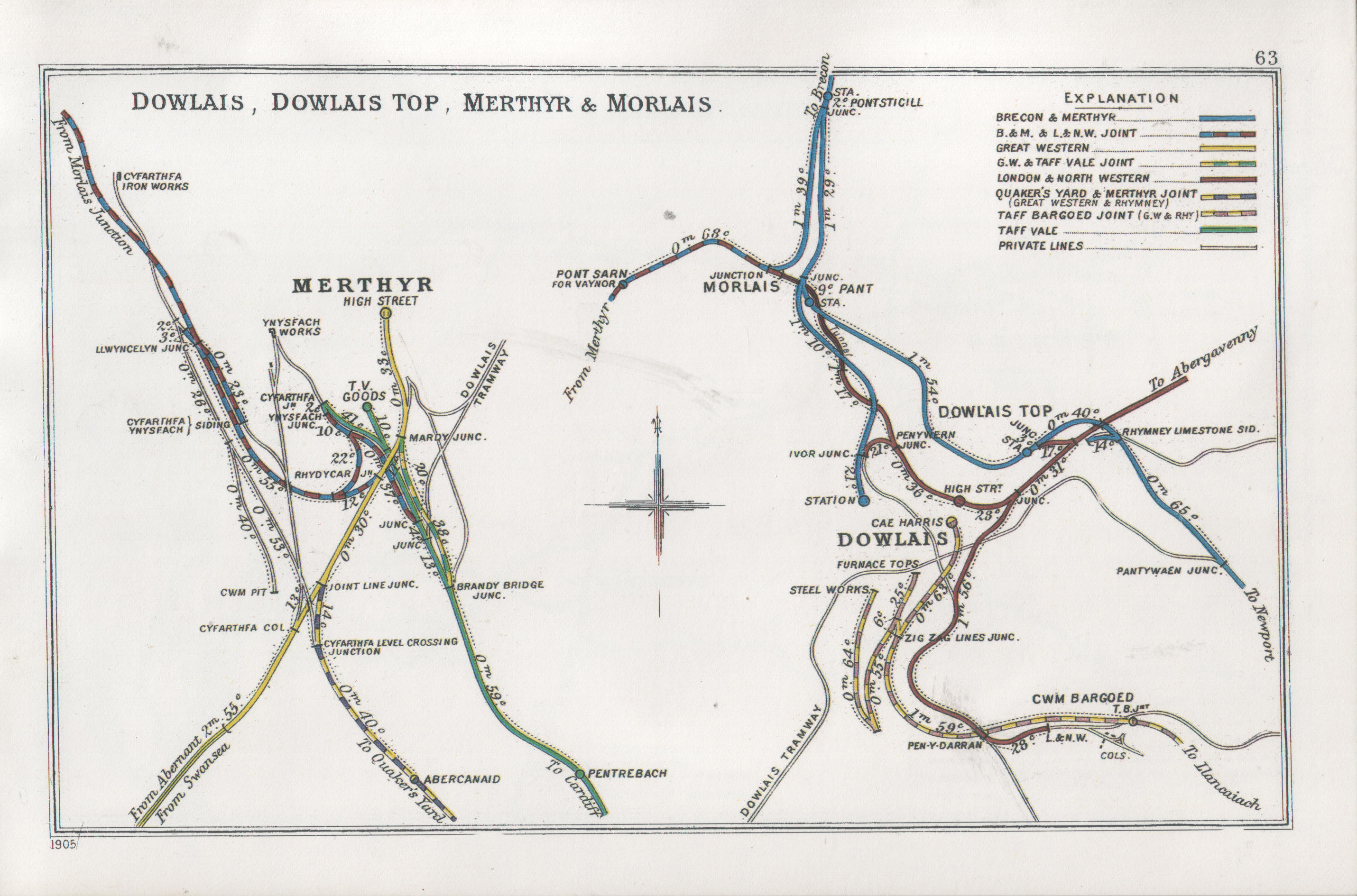
A 1905 Railway Clearing House map of railways in the vicinity of Merthyr Tydfil (left, the QY&MR is shown in yellow and violet)

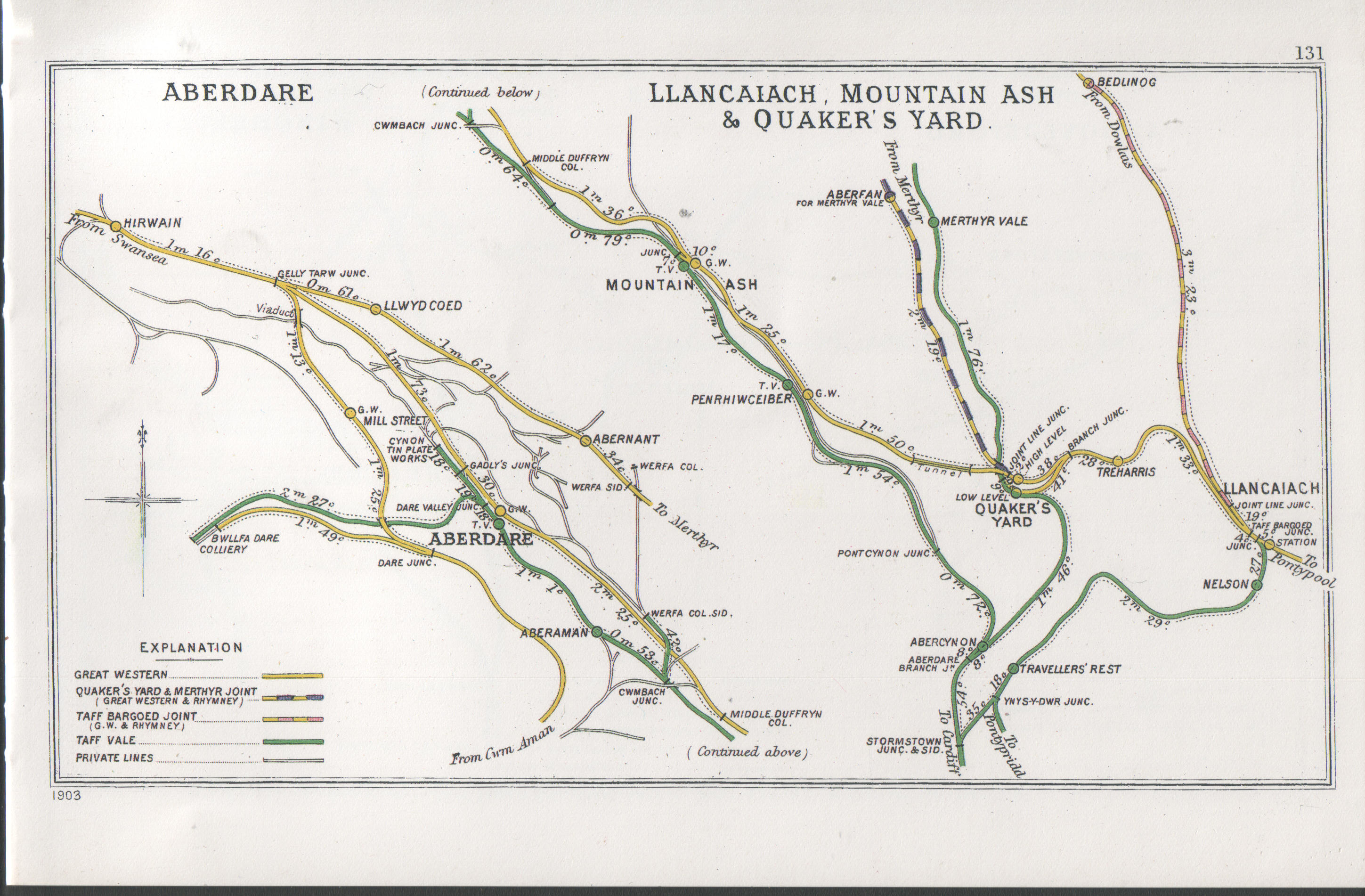
A 1903 Railway Clearing House map of railways in the vicinity of Quaker's Yard (right, the QY&MR is shown in yellow and violet)

At its southern end, the line connected to the Vale of Neath line of the Great Western Railway (GWR) at Joint Line Junction, just west of Quakers Yard High Level railway station. The line ran up the Vale of Merthyr, and at the northern end it connected to the Merthyr branch of the Vale of Neath line at Cyfarthfa Junction.

=== Ownership and operation ===
The line opened in 1886 and was jointly owned and operated by the GWR and the Rhymney Railway.

=== Closure ===
Passenger trains over the line ran between Merthyr Tydfil and Cardiff. The services ended in 1951.
