= Rhymney railway station =

Railway station in Caerphilly, Wales

Rhymney Welsh: Rhymni
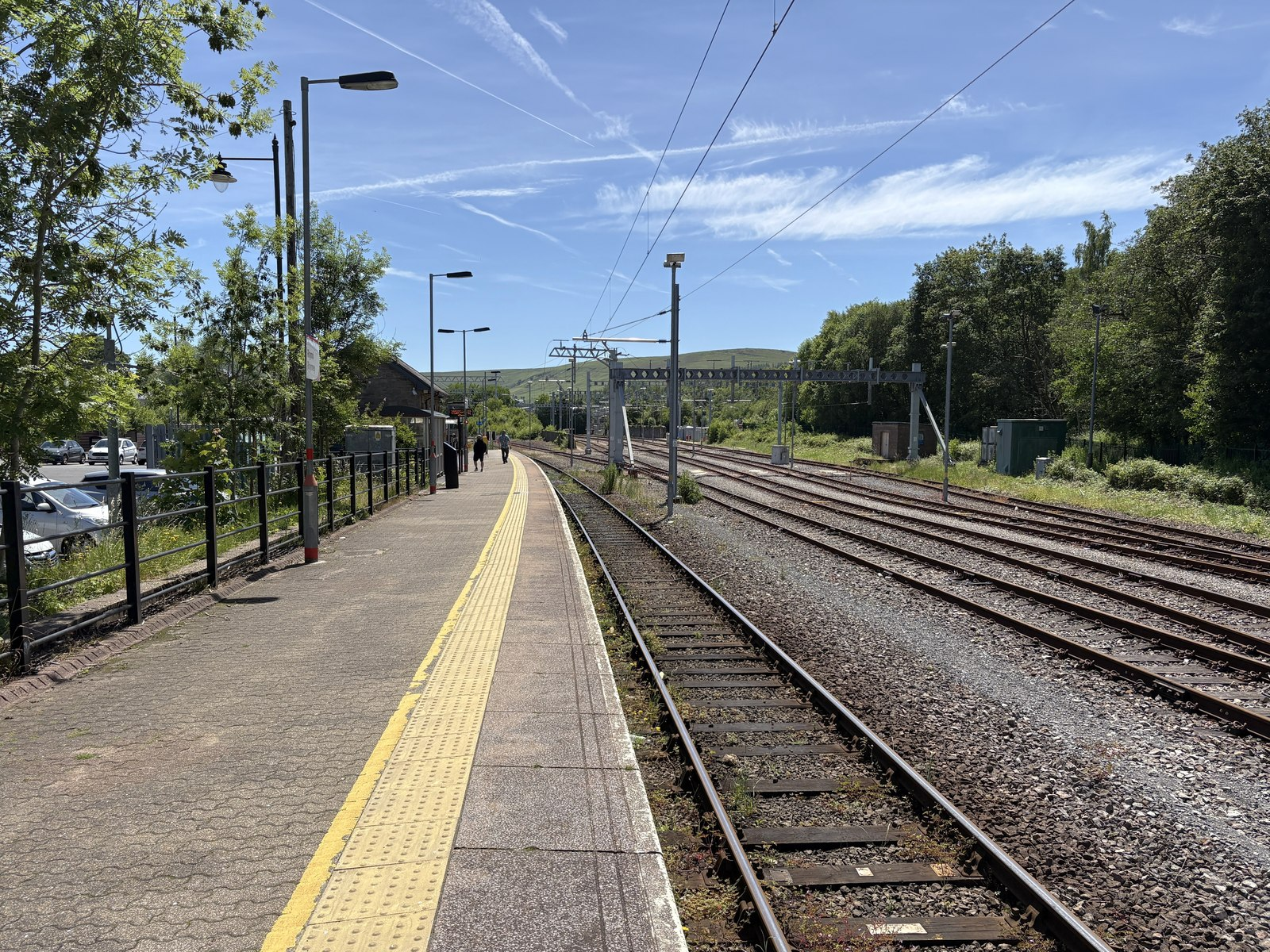
- Rhymney station in June 2026

General information
- Location: Rhymney, Caerphilly; Wales
- Coordinates: 51°45′32″N 3°17′23″W
- Grid reference: SO110074
- Manager: Transport for Wales
- Platforms: 1

Other information
- Station code: RHY
- Classification: DfT category F1

History
- Opened: 31 March 1858

Passengers
- 2021/22: ▲53,116
- 2022/23: ▲93,524
- 2023/24: ▲0.107 million
- 2024/25: ▲0.123 million
- 2025/26: ▼75,890
Location
Notes
- Passenger statistics from the Office of Rail and Road

Rhymney railway station serves the town of Rhymney in Wales. Situated on the Valley Lines network 23 miles (37 km) north of Cardiff Central, it is the terminus of the Rhymney Line. The station has sidings to the west of its single platform which are used for the overnight stabling of the diesel multiple unit trains.

== History ==
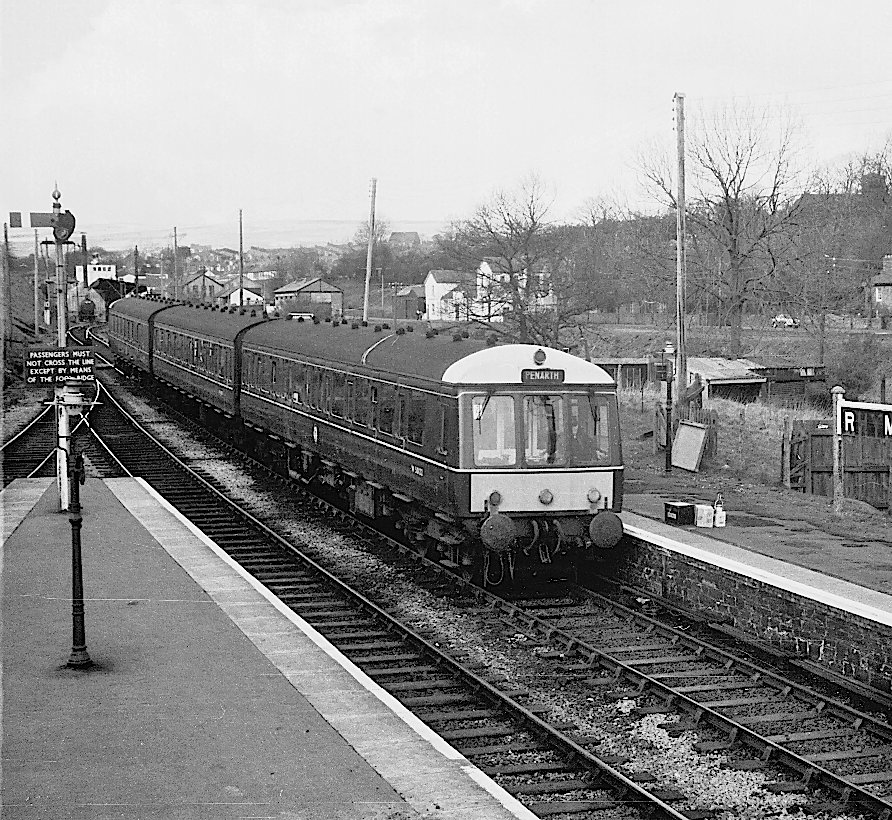
Rhymney station in 1962

The railway south from here was opened by the Rhymney Railway in 1858 as far as Hengoed and Walnut Tree Junction (giving access to Cardiff Central via the Taff Vale Railway by 1864), with a link northwards to Rhymney Bridge (on the Merthyr to Abergavenny 'Heads of the Valley' line) following in 1871. This was operated jointly with the London and North Western Railway. In the same year the current route through Caerphilly was opened by the Rhymney company, removing the need for its trains to use TVR metals to reach Cardiff. Services to the north ended in 1953 with the closure of the joint line to Rhymney Bridge to passenger traffic (with complete closure following in November 1954). The section down to Bargoed was also subsequently singled and the station reduced in size, with the decommissioning of the old island platform. This remained intact but disused for many years, but was demolished in 2007 when the stabling sidings were relaid and re-aligned.

== Services ==
The Monday to Saturday daytime service pattern is two trains an hour to Cardiff Central: one continues to Barry Island and one to Bridgend. The Bridgend service skips intermediate stops between Rhymney and Bargoed.

On Sundays, the service pattern is one train an hour southbound to Cardiff Central and Barry Island.

Preceding station	National Rail	Following station
Terminus	Transport for Wales; Rhymney Line	Pontlottyn or Bargoed
	Disused railways	
Rhymney Bridge; Line and station closed	London and North Western Railway and Rhymney Railway; Nantybwch and Rhymney Joint Line	Pontlottyn; Line and station open
