= Rhymney line =

Commuter rail line in Wales

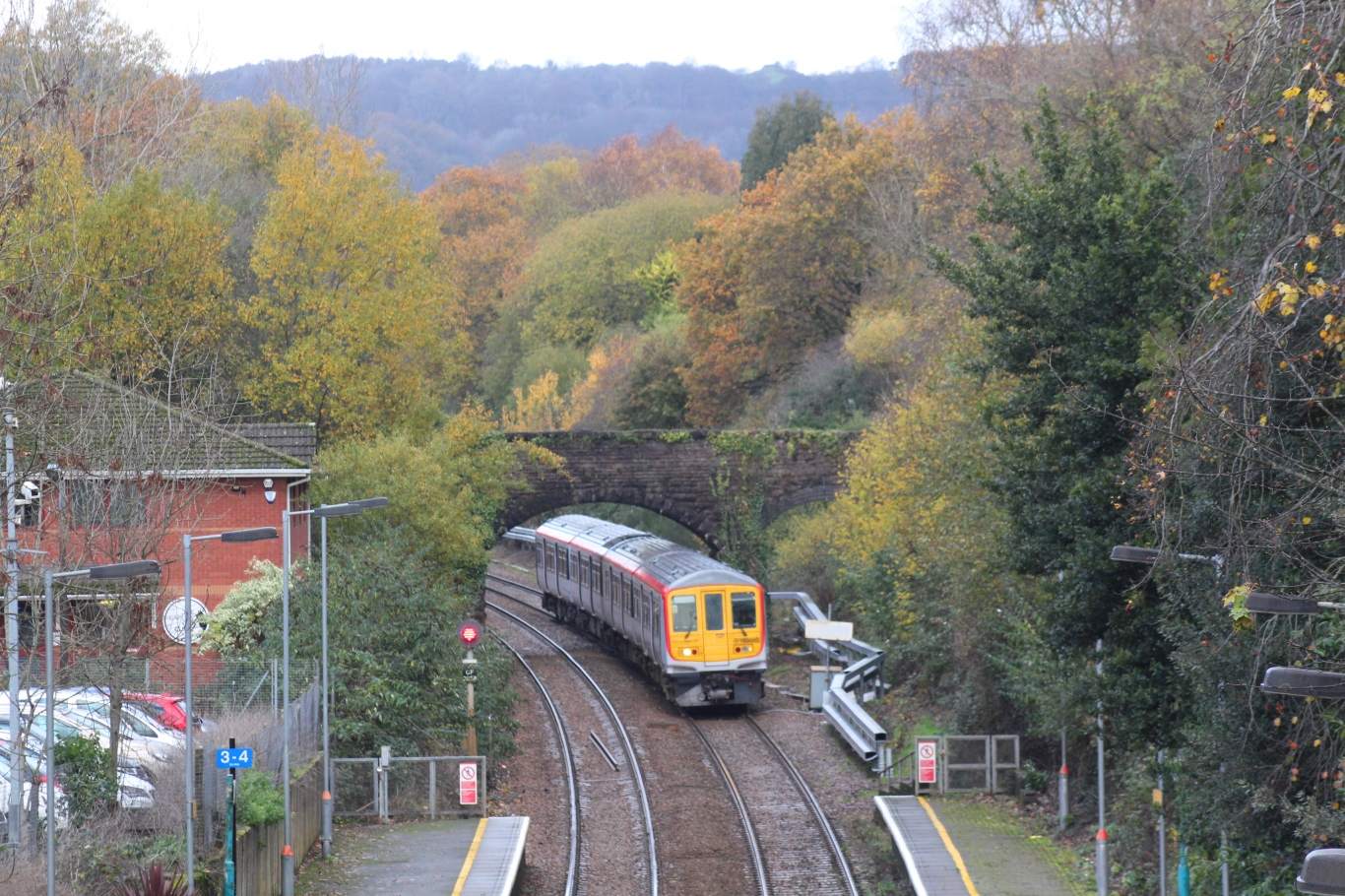
- A Class 769 at Llanishen railway station

Overview
- Owner: Transport for Wales
- Locale: Rhymney Valley
- Termini: Cardiff Queen Street; Rhymney

Service
- Type: Heavy rail
- System: National Rail
- Operator: Transport for Wales Rail
- Rolling stock: Class 150 DMUs; Class 153; Class 231

Technical
- Line length: 22 miles 61 chains (36.6 km)
- Number of tracks: Double track Cardiff–Bargoed; Single track Bargoed–Rhymney; with a passing loop at Tir-Phil
- Track gauge: 1,435 mm (4 ft 8 1/2 in) standard gauge
Route map
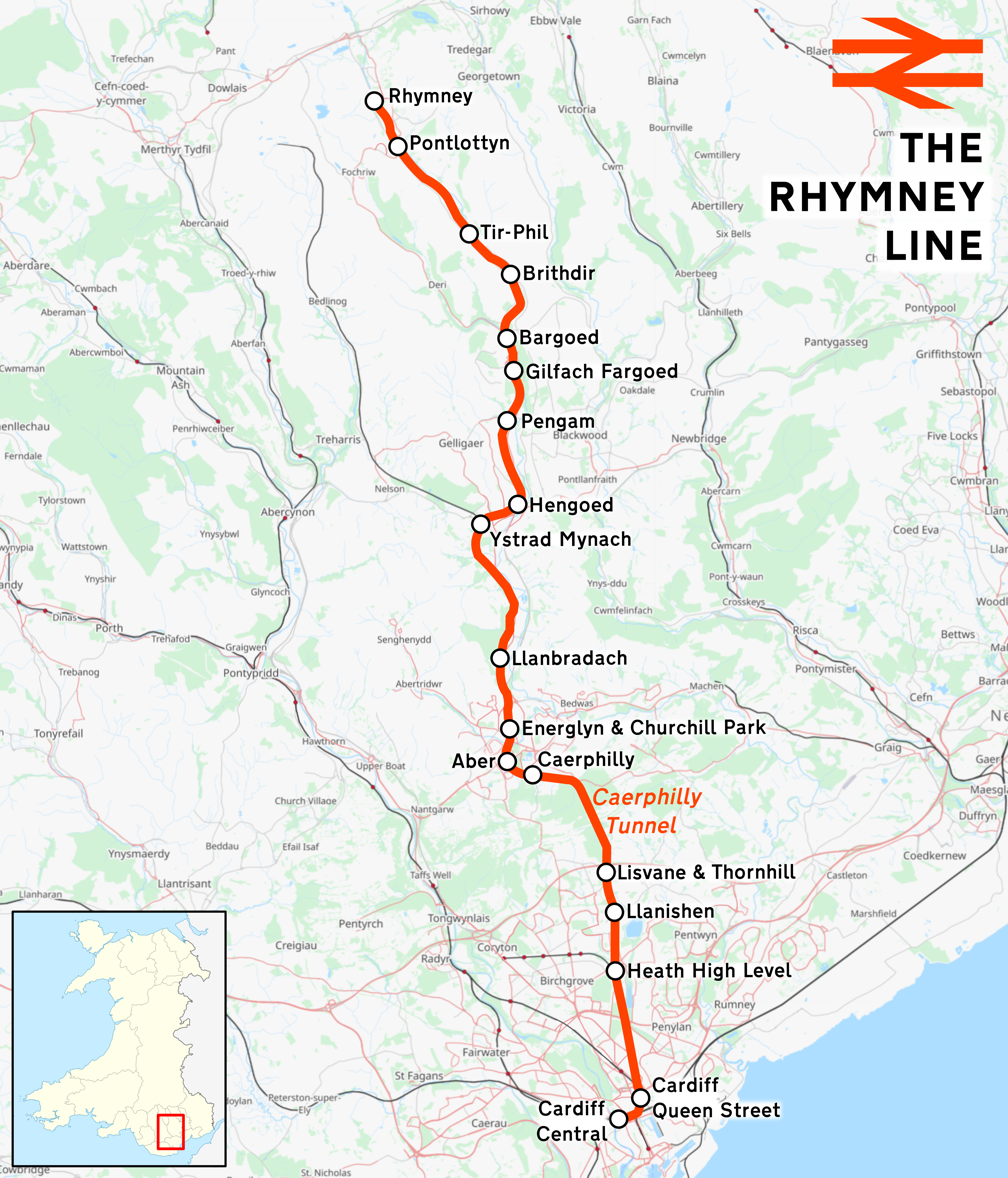
(Click to expand)

The Rhymney line is a commuter rail line running from Cardiff Central through the Rhymney valley via Heath and Llanishen in the north of the city, to Caerphilly, Bargoed and Rhymney.

== History ==
The name comes from the fact that the original line was part of the Rhymney Railway's system.

The line is currently operated by Transport for Wales Rail Services as part of the Valley Lines network. TfW replaced the previous franchise, Arriva Trains Wales in October 2018.

In March 2007 the latest in a series of infrastructure improvements on the Valley Lines was announced, which included lengthening of platforms between Rhymney and Penarth to allow Class 150 units to operate in multiples of 3 (6 cars). However, this is postponed indefinitely due to the sub-lease by the Department for Transport, to Great Western Railway, of the units that would have allowed this extra capacity.

== Service ==
The line currently has a 15-minute daytime headway between Bargoed and Cardiff, with most journeys terminating at Barry Island or Bridgend. Prior to re-signalling early in 2006, a 20-minute headway was operated. North of Bargoed, two trains per hour runs over the single track, including the passing loop at Tir-Phil, to Rhymney. The Sunday service operates over the entire length of the line every 1 hour since 2019, though this now runs all the day since Dec 2005. There are six trains running between Caerphilly and Cardiff since 2024.

Monday to Saturday services trains that starts its journey from Bargoed or Rhymney will continue to Barry Island or Bridgend and trains that starts its journey from Caerphilly will terminate at Penarth. Sunday services only continues to Barry Island from Rhymney/Caerphilly.

Monday - Saturday Services:

- 1tph from Rhymeny to Barry Island
- 1tph from Rhymeny to Bridgend (Non-Stop from Rhymney to Bargoed)
- 2tph from Bargoed to Barry Island
- 2tph from Caerphilly to Penarth
- 1tph from Bridgend to Rhymeny
- 1tph from Barry Island to Rhymeny (Non-Stop from Bargoed to Rhymney)
- 2tph from Barry Island to Bargoed
- 2tph from Penarth to Caerphilly

Sunday Services:

- 1tph from Rhymney to Barry Island
- 1tph from Caerphilly to Barry Island
- 1tph from Barry Island to Rhymney
- 1tph from Barry Island to Caerphilly

=== Rolling stock ===
Current stock comprises Class 150, Class 153 and Class 231 units.

Some peak hour and Saturday services were formed of one Class 37/4 locomotive and four Mk. 2F carriages. Two locomotives received special heritage repaints into 1960s BR Green livery (no. 37411) or 1980s BR Blue Large Logo livery (no. 37425) to mark the end of locomotive-hauled trains. Two Class 37s (nos. 37425 and 37408) were involved in a runaway situation and collided at Rhymney Sidings on 30 July 2005. Number 37408 was withdrawn, and replaced by previously stored no. 37419. Number 37425 was repaired, but whilst it was out of traffic, Class 47 locomotives were hired from Riviera Trains as cover. Class 37-hauled trains finished on 10 December 2005, however in the new year Arriva received complaints from commuters about comfort and over-crowding, so reinstated a Monday to Friday diagram, operating a morning train into Cardiff, and an evening train back to Rhymney, usually using 37410. With the December 2006 timetable change this service reverted to DMU, and with Arriva Trains Wales said to be disposing of its loco hauled stock, it would appear as though the end of loco haulage on the line has finally come. This service is now operated with Transport for Wales since 2018.

Loco-hauled stock hauled by Class 37s returned between June 2019 and March 2020.

== Electrification of the line ==
On 16 July 2012 plans to electrify the line were announced by the UK Government. The announcement was made as an extension of the electrification of the South Wales Main Line from Cardiff to Swansea and the electrification of the south Wales Valley Lines at a total cost of £350 million. The investment will require new trains and should result in reduced journeys times and a cheaper to maintain network.

Work was expected to start between 2014 and 2019, but was then pushed back to between 2019 and 2024. Preliminary re-signalling work on the route, which saw the remaining manual signal boxes at Heath, Ystrad Mynach and Bargoed abolished in favour of remote control from the new Cardiff Rail Operating Centre, was completed in early September 2013.

In addition, a new station at Energlyn & Churchill Park in Caerphilly was opened on 16 December 2013, with trains running from there since 8 December.

However, as part of Welsh Government's South Wales Metro this line has been taken over, it was announced that the line would be electrified in preparation for new Class 756 rolling stock. Work on electrification began in March 2025, and was completed in December 2025.

== See also ==
- List of railway stations in Cardiff
