= Tonypandy railway station =

Railway station in Rhondda Cynon Taf, Wales

Tonypandy
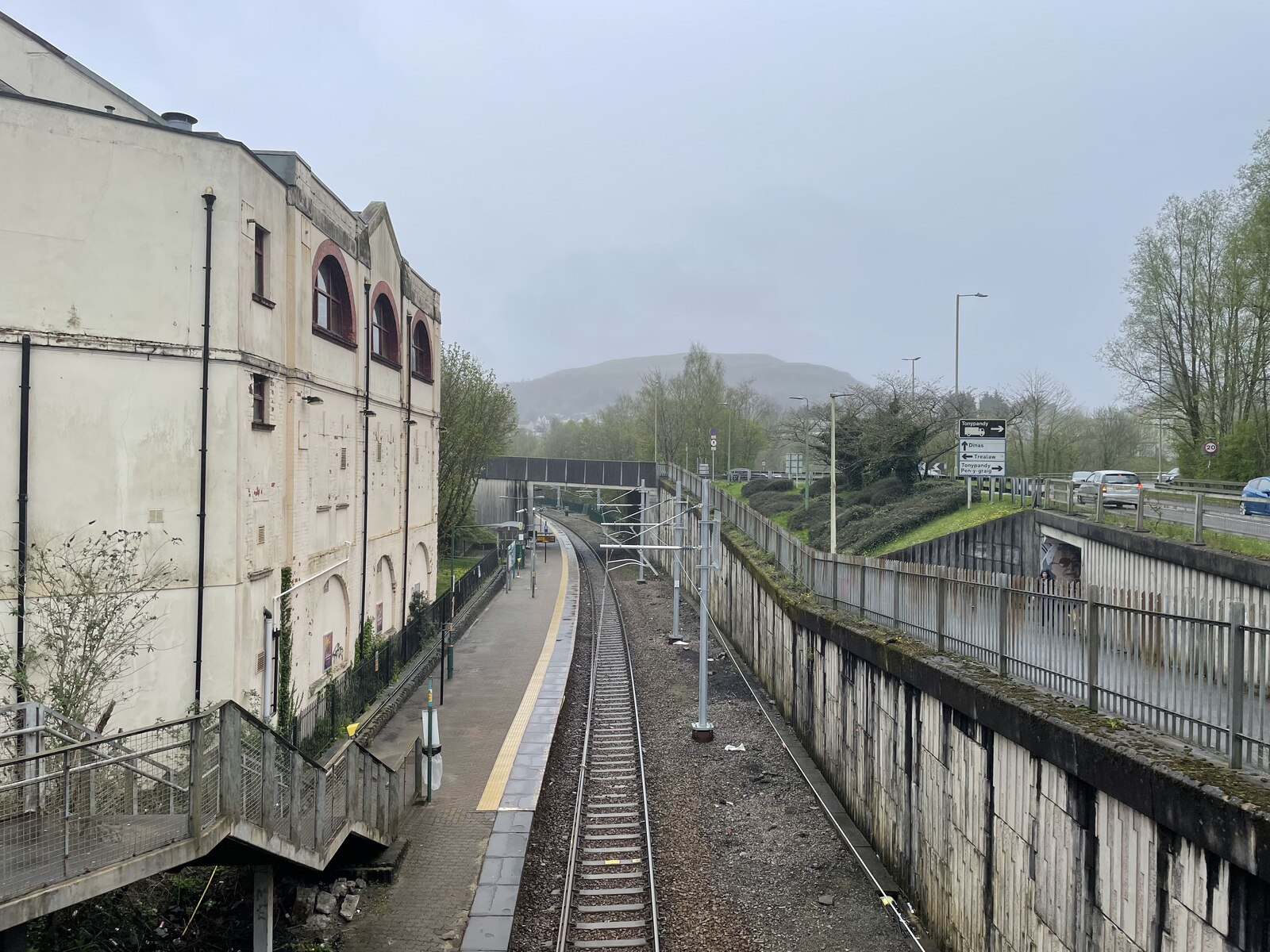

General information
- Location: Tonypandy, Rhondda Cynon Taf; Wales
- Coordinates: 51°37′12″N 3°26′57″W
- Grid reference: SS997922
- Manager: Transport for Wales
- Platforms: 1

Other information
- Station code: TNP
- Classification: DfT category F1

History
- Opened: March 1908

Passengers
- 2020/21: ▼15,962
- 2021/22: ▲61,340
- 2022/23: ▲78,860
- 2023/24: ▼42,802
- 2024/25: ▲0.112 million
Location
Notes
- Passenger statistics from the Office of Rail and Road

Tonypandy railway station is a railway station serving the town of Tonypandy in south Wales. It is located on the Rhondda Line, between Llywynypia and Dinas Rhondda, 18 miles 3 chains (29.0 km) from Cardiff Docks (Bute Town).

== History ==
The original Pandy station was opened on 1 May 1861 by the Taff Vale Railway, but was closed on 2 August 1886 and later demolished, to be replaced by Dinas Station. The new station, then known as Trealaw and Tonypandy, was built of red bricks and opened on 9 March 1908. It was opposite the entrance to Foundry Road at the centre of two bridges (one of which crossed the river to Tonypandy and the other which crossed the railway lines to Judges’ Hall and to Trealaw). One year later the name was changed to Tonypandy and Trealaw, and then to its current name on 7 May 1973.

== Location ==
The station is accessible via a ramp from Trealaw Road and via a footpath over the Rhondda River from Bridge Street. The station is noted for having poor connectivity within the town and to the local bus station.

== Facilities ==
The station has a dot matrix departure screen, a ticket machine, and a waiting area. There is no help point, nor any cycle spaces.

== Passenger volume ==
Passenger Volume at Tonypandy
	2002–03	2004–05	2005–06	2006–07	2007–08	2008–09	2009–10	2010–11	2011–12	2012–13	2013–14	2014–15	2015–16	2016–17	2017–18	2018–19	2019–20	2020–21	2021–22	2022–23
Entries and exits	143,240	83,745	71,578	84,926	78,305	82,566	94,942	77,796	79,600	88,770	79,290	82,396	82,036	114,840	110,928	102,630	93,486	15,962	61,340	78,860

The statistics cover twelve month periods that start in April.

== Services ==
Monday-Saturday, there is a half-hourly service to Pontypridd & Cardiff Central southbound and to Treherbert northbound. There is a two hourly service in each direction on Sundays, with through trains to Barry Island southbound. On 20 July 2018, previous franchise operator Arriva Trains Wales announced a trial period of extra Sunday services on the Rhondda Line to Cardiff and Barry Island. This was in response to a survey by Leanne Wood and the success of extra Sunday services on the Merthyr Line and the Rhymney Line.

The services from this station were suspended in summer 2023, due to major route upgrade work being carried out at multiple locations as part of the Valley Lines electrification scheme. A replacement bus service operated between Pontypridd and Treherbert, calling at all local stations, until February 2024. Rail services resumed at the station on 26 February 2024 following completion of the majority of the infrastructure works.

Preceding station	National Rail	Following station
Dinas Rhondda	Transport for Wales; Rhondda Line	Llwynypia

== Bibliography ==
- Quick, Michael (2023). Railway Passenger Stations in Great Britain: A Chronology (PDF) (5th ed.). London: Railway and Canal Historical Society.
