= Llwynypia railway station =

Railway station in Rhondda Cynon Taf, Wales

Llwynypia
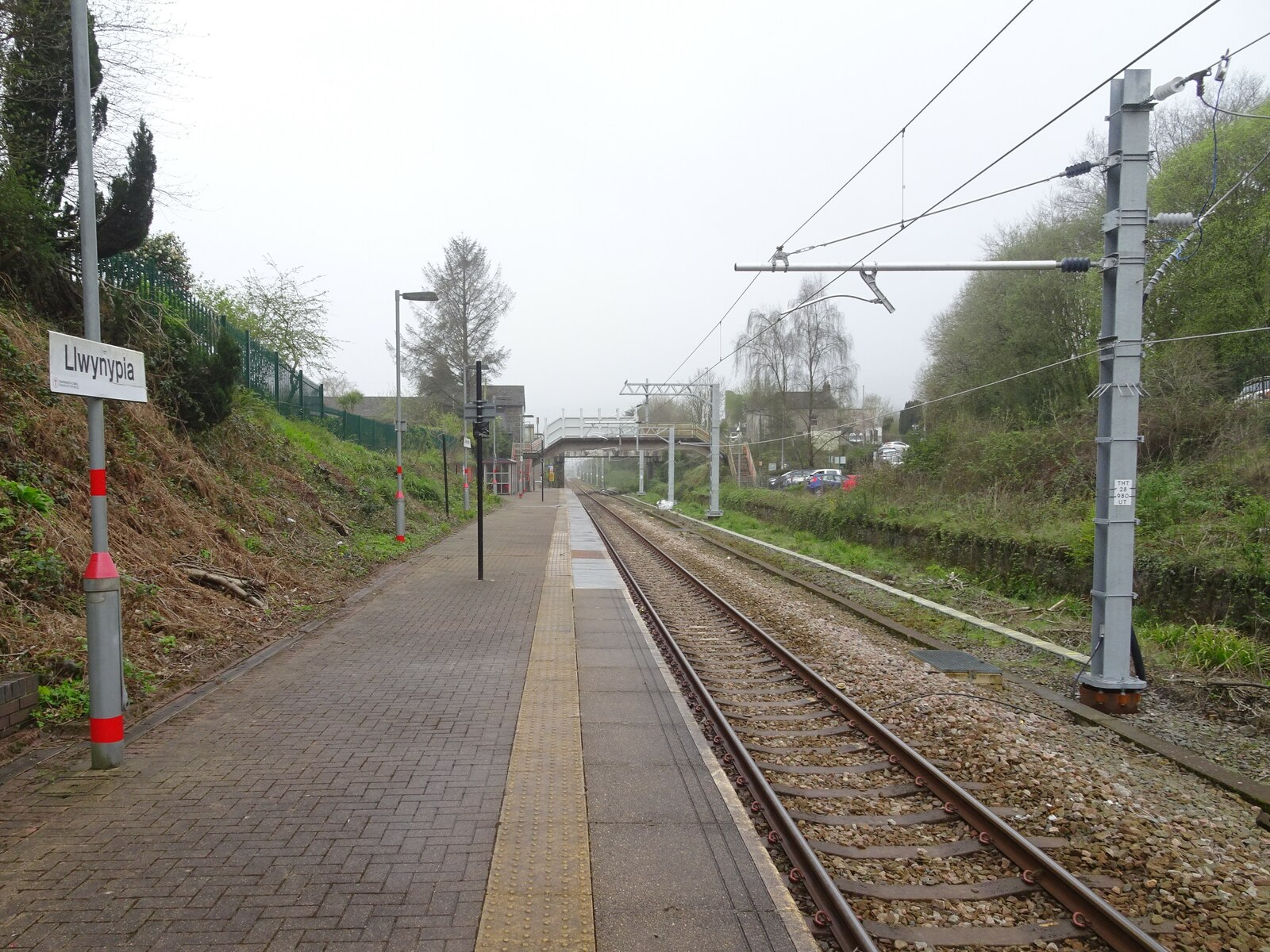

General information
- Location: Llwynypia, Rhondda Cynon Taf; Wales
- Coordinates: 51°38′01″N 3°27′12″W
- Grid reference: SS995937
- Managed by: Transport for Wales
- Platforms: 1

Other information
- Station code: LLY
- Classification: DfT category F2

Key dates
- 1863 or 1871: Opened

Passengers
- 2020/21: ▼7,832
- 2021/22: ▲31,794
- 2022/23: ▲38,766
- 2023/24: ▼18,290
- 2024/25: ▲53,140
Location
Notes
- Passenger statistics from the Office of Rail and Road

Llwynypia railway station is a railway station serving the village of Llwynypia in Wales. It is located on the Rhondda Line, between Tonypandy and Ystrad Rhondda, 19 miles 7 chains (30.7 km) from Cardiff Docks (Bute Town).

== History ==
Although the line through the present site opened in 1856 and passenger services began in 1863, the station itself was first opened on this site by the Taff Vale Railway either in 1863 or 1871. Originally named Llwynpia, it was amended to its current spelling in 1883.

== Facilities ==
The station has a ticket machine, a sheltered waiting area, a dot matrix departure board, and spaces for up to 6 bicycles. There is no help point.

== Passenger volume ==
Passenger Volume at Llwynypia
	2002–03	2004–05	2005–06	2006–07	2007–08	2008–09	2009–10	2010–11	2011–12	2012–13	2013–14	2014–15	2015–16	2016–17	2017–18	2018–19	2019–20	2020–21	2021–22	2022–23
Entries and exits	77,934	64,303	51,683	64,894	64,946	54,180	56,808	45,688	48,948	55,688	58,202	55,540	54,048	61,348	61,724	53,448	48,794	7,832	31,794	38,766

The statistics cover twelve month periods that start in April.

== Services ==
Monday-Saturday daytime, there is a half-hourly service to Cardiff Central southbound and to Treherbert northbound (dropping to hourly in the late evening). There is a two hourly service in each direction on Sundays. On 20 July 2018, previous franchise operator Arriva Trains Wales announced a trial period of extra Sunday services on the Rhondda Line to Cardiff and Barry Island. This was in response to a survey by Leanne Wood and the success of extra Sunday services on the Merthyr Line and the Rhymney Line.

The services from this station were suspended in Summer 2023, due to major route upgrade work being carried out at multiple locations as part of the Valley Lines electrification scheme. A replacement bus service operated between Pontypridd and Treherbert, calling at all local stations, until February 2024. Rail services resumed at the station on 26 February 2024 following completion of the majority of the infrastructure works.

Preceding station	National Rail	Following station
Tonypandy	Transport for Wales; Rhondda Line	Ystrad Rhondda

== Bibliography ==
- Quick, Michael (2023). Railway Passenger Stations in Great Britain: A Chronology (PDF) (5th ed.). London: Railway and Canal Historical Society.
