= Dinas Rhondda railway station =

Railway station in Rhondda Cynon Taf, Wales

Dinas Rhondda
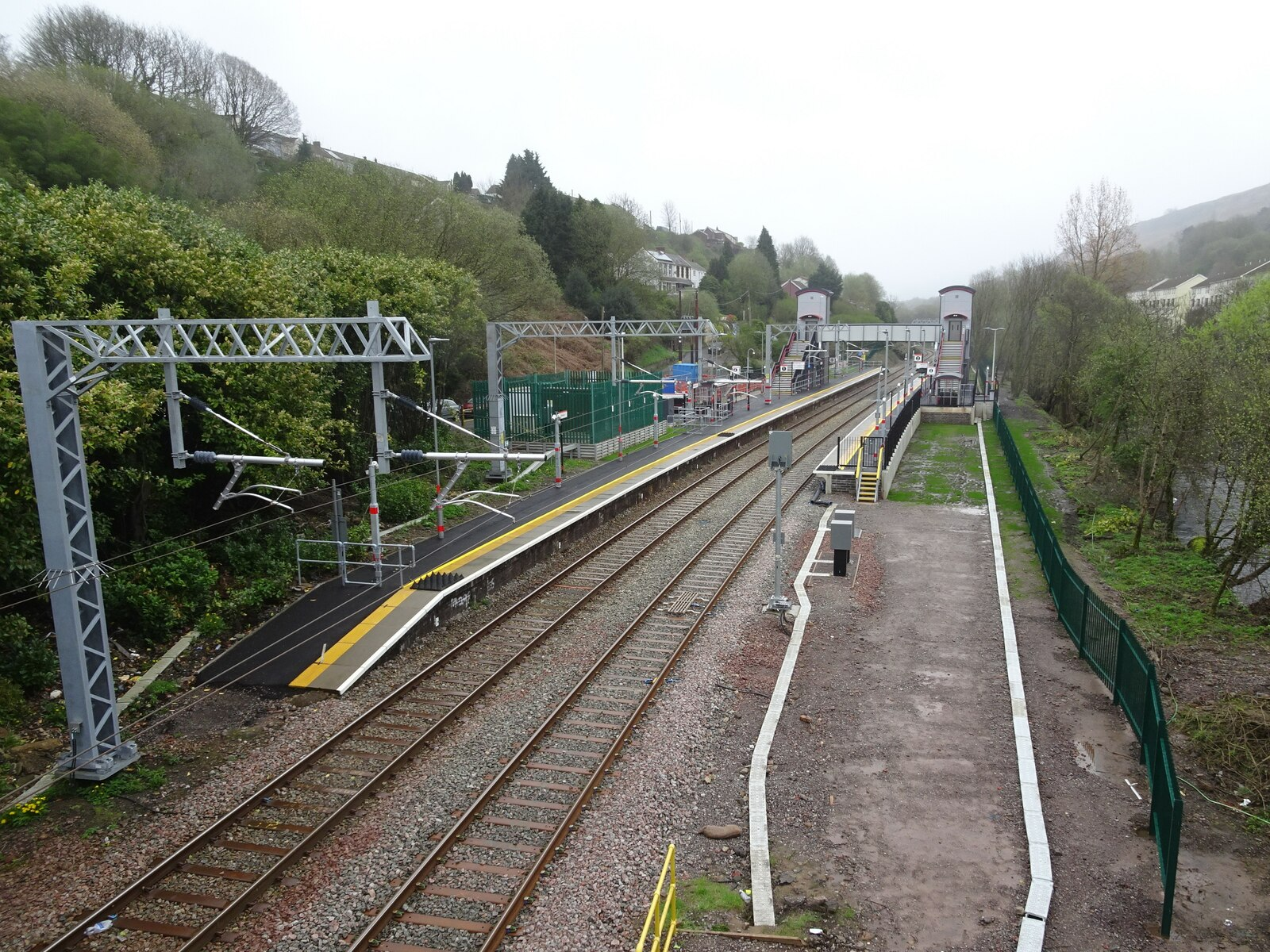

General information
- Location: Dinas Rhondda, Rhondda Cynon Taf; Wales
- Coordinates: 51°37′03″N 3°26′14″W
- Grid reference: ST005919
- Manager: Transport for Wales
- Platforms: 2

Other information
- Station code: DMG
- Classification: DfT category F1

Key dates
- 2 August 1886: opened
- 1 April 1917: closed
- July 1919: reopened
- 30th April 2023: closed for South Wales Metro upgrades
- February 2024: reopened with upgrades complete

Passengers
- 2021/22: ▲25,050
- 2022/23: ▲29,452
- 2023/24: ▼12,016
- 2024/25: ▲46,050
- 2025/26: ▲52,010
Location
Notes
- Passenger statistics from the Office of Rail and Road

Dinas Rhondda railway station (also spelt Dinas (Rhondda)) is a railway station serving the Dinas, Penygraig and Trealaw districts of Tonypandy, Wales. It is located on the Rhondda Line, between Tonypandy and Porth, 17 miles 41 chains (28.2 km) from Cardiff Docks (Bute Town).

== History ==
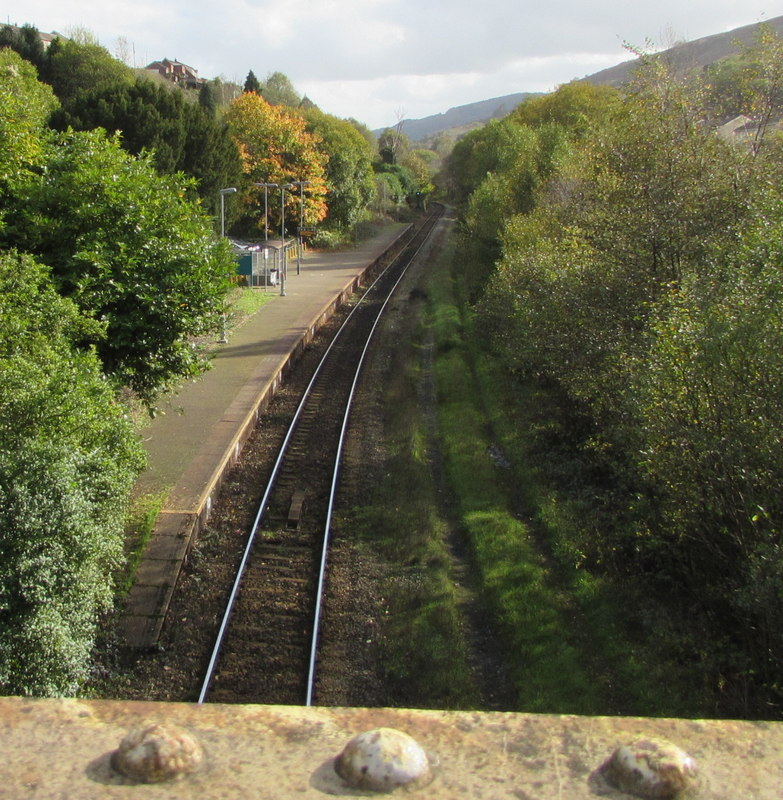
The station seen in 2017, before electrification and redoubling

The station opened as Dinas on 2 August 1886, replacing the station at Pandy, approximately 17 chains (1,100 ft) to the south. It was closed briefly from 1 April 1917 until July 1919 when it reopened. The station was renamed to its current name in 1927.

One of the two platforms, originally removed when the line was singled, was reinstated (as well as a new footbridge installed) during works in 2024 as part of the Treherbert Line transformation programme.

== Facilities ==
The station has a small car park and cycle spaces, help points, shelters and dot matrix departure screens. The new footbridge has lifts, thereby giving step-free access to both platforms.

== Passenger volume ==
Passenger Volume at Dinas Rhondda
	2002–03	2004–05	2005–06	2006–07	2007–08	2008–09	2009–10	2010–11	2011–12	2012–13	2013–14	2014–15	2015–16	2016–17	2017–18	2018–19	2019–20	2020–21	2021–22	2022–23
Entries and exits	49,298	34,289	41,925	52,021	60,555	59,464	61,008	58,390	57,372	62,450	62,822	59,680	50,456	57,814	52,822	47,380	40,116	5,860	25,050	29,452

The statistics cover twelve month periods that start in April.

== Services ==
Monday-Saturday, there is a half-hourly service to Cardiff Central southbound and to Treherbert northbound. This drops to hourly in the evenings and two-hourly in each direction on Sundays. On 20 July 2018, previous franchise operator Arriva Trains Wales announced a trial period of extra Sunday services on the Rhondda Line to Cardiff and Barry Island. This was in response to a survey by Leanne Wood and the success of extra Sunday services on the Merthyr Line and the Rhymney Line.

The services from this station were suspended in Summer 2023, due to major route upgrade work being carried out at multiple locations as part of the Valley Lines electrification scheme. A replacement bus service operated between Pontypridd and Treherbert, calling at all local stations, until February 2024. Rail services resumed at the station on 26 February 2024 following completion of the majority of the infrastructure works.

Preceding station	National Rail	Following station
Porth	Transport for Wales; Rhondda Line	Tonypandy

== Bibliography ==
- Quick, Michael (2023). Railway Passenger Stations in Great Britain: A Chronology (PDF) (5th ed.). London: Railway and Canal Historical Society.
