= Ton Pentre railway station =

Railway station in Rhondda Cynon Taf, Wales

Ton Pentre
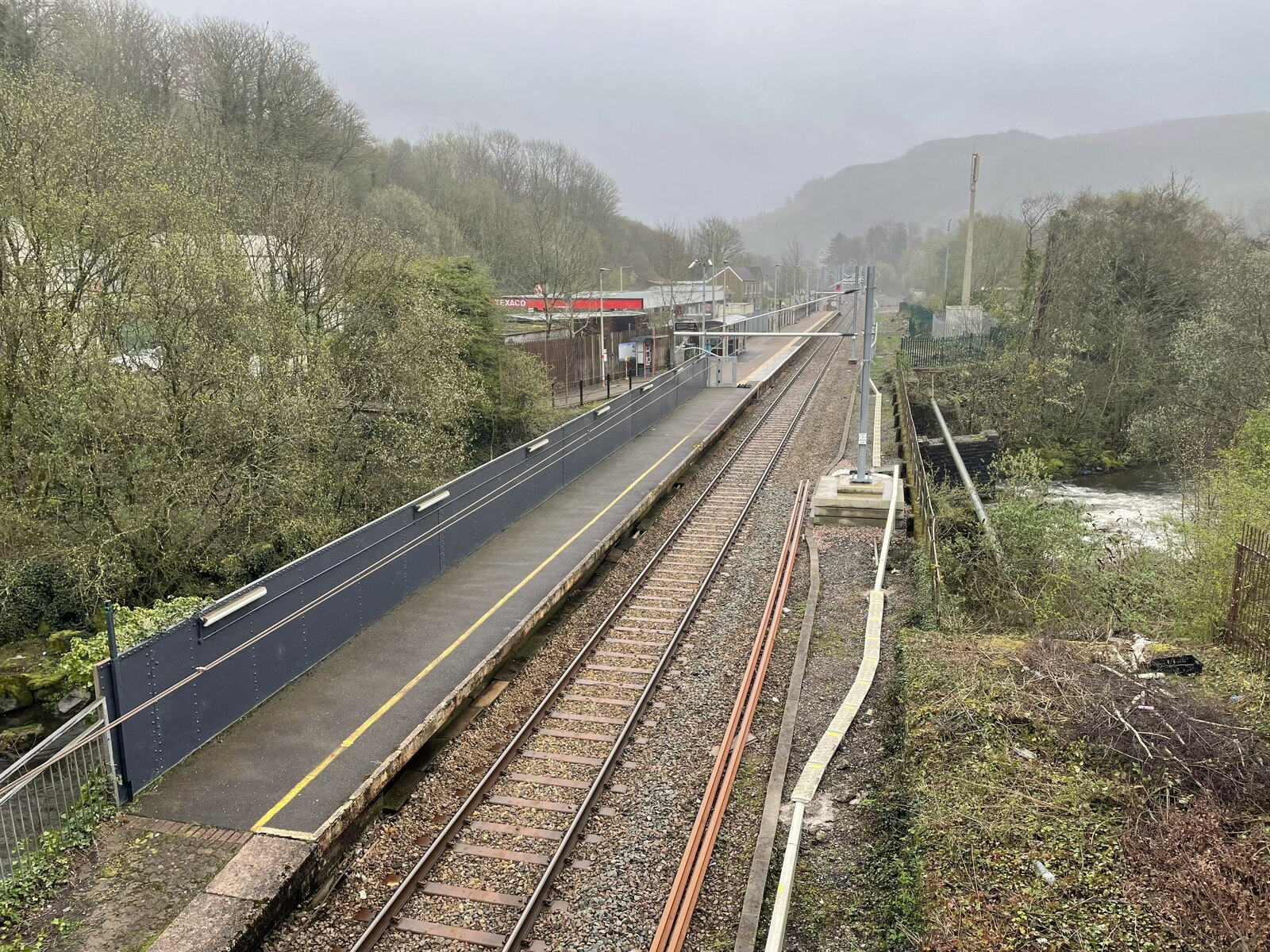

General information
- Location: Ton Pentre, Rhondda Cynon Taf; Wales
- Coordinates: 51.6478°N 3.4863°W
- Grid reference: SS972953
- Managed by: Transport for Wales
- Platforms: 1

Other information
- Station code: TPN
- Classification: DfT category F2

History
- Original company: Taff Vale Railway
- Pre-grouping: Taff Vale Railway
- Post-grouping: Great Western Railway

Key dates
- 4 February 1861: Opened as Ystrad
- December 1930: Renamed Ystrad (Rhondda)
- 29 September 1986: Renamed Ton Pentre

Passengers
- 2020/21: ▼13,024
- 2021/22: ▲45,346
- 2022/23: ▲53,622
- 2023/24: ▼36,352
- 2024/25: ▲79,222
Location
Notes
- Passenger statistics from the Office of Rail and Road

Ton Pentre railway station is a railway station serving the village of Ton Pentre in Rhondda Cynon Taf, Wales. It is located on the Rhondda Line, between Ystrad Rhondda and Treorchy, 20 miles 75 chains (33.7 km) from Cardiff Docks (Bute Town).

== History ==
The station was opened by the Taff Vale Railway (TVR) on 4 February 1861. The station was renamed Ystrad Rhondda in December 1930. On 29 September 1986, the station was renamed Ton Pentre, when Ystrad Rhondda opened to the south.

=== South Wales Metro transformation ===
Ystrad Rhondda station was significantly affected by the South Wales Metro electrification programme, with services suspended from April 2023 to February 2024 to enable major infrastructure upgrades. The closure allowed for the installation of 25kV AC overhead electrification equipment along the Treherbert line and the replacement of the century-old token signalling system with modern electronic signalling.

During the closure period, a replacement bus service operated every 30 minutes between Pontypridd and Treherbert. The transformation works were part of a £1 billion investment in the South Wales Metro, described as the largest and most complex engineering project taking place in Wales.

The Treherbert line was electrified in May 2024, and the first electric train services began operating in November 2024 using new Stadler Class 756 tri-mode trains. These modern trains feature improved capacity, air conditioning, Wi-Fi, and passenger information screens, representing a significant upgrade from the previous diesel rolling stock.

== Facilities ==
Ton Pentre has basic facilities including a seated waiting area and a ticket machine. The station provides four bicycle storage stands. The station has step-free access.

== Passenger volume ==
Passenger Volume at Ton Pentre
	2002–03	2004–05	2005–06	2006–07	2007–08	2008–09	2009–10	2010–11	2011–12	2012–13	2013–14	2014–15	2015–16	2016–17	2017–18	2018–19	2019–20	2020–21	2021–22	2022–23
Entries and exits	95,111	44,901	37,998	46,826	92,481	100,922	109,428	39,698	40,608	46,488	46,818	47,102	43,858	74,984	79,880	68,608	66,868	13,024	45,346	53,622

The statistics cover twelve month periods that start in April.

== Services ==
Monday-Saturday, there is a half-hourly service to Cardiff Central southbound and to Treherbert northbound. There is an hourly service in the late evening and a two-hourly service in each direction on Sundays. On 20 July 2018, previous franchise operator Arriva Trains Wales announced a trial period of extra Sunday services on the Rhondda Line to Cardiff and Barry Island. This was in response to a survey by Leanne Wood and the success of extra Sunday services on the Merthyr Line and the Rhymney Line.

The services from this station were suspended in Summer 2023, due to major route upgrade work being carried out at multiple locations as part of the Valley Lines electrification scheme. A replacement bus service operated between Pontypridd and to Treherbert, calling at all local stations, until February 2024. Rail services resumed at the station from 26 February 2024 following completion of the majority of the infrastructure works.

Preceding station	National Rail	Following station
Ystrad Rhondda	Transport for Wales; Rhondda Line	Treorchy

== Bibliography ==
- Quick, Michael (2023). Railway Passenger Stations in Great Britain: A Chronology (PDF) (5th ed.). London: Railway and Canal Historical Society.
