= Trehafod railway station =

Railway station in Rhondda Cynon Taf, Wales

Trehafod
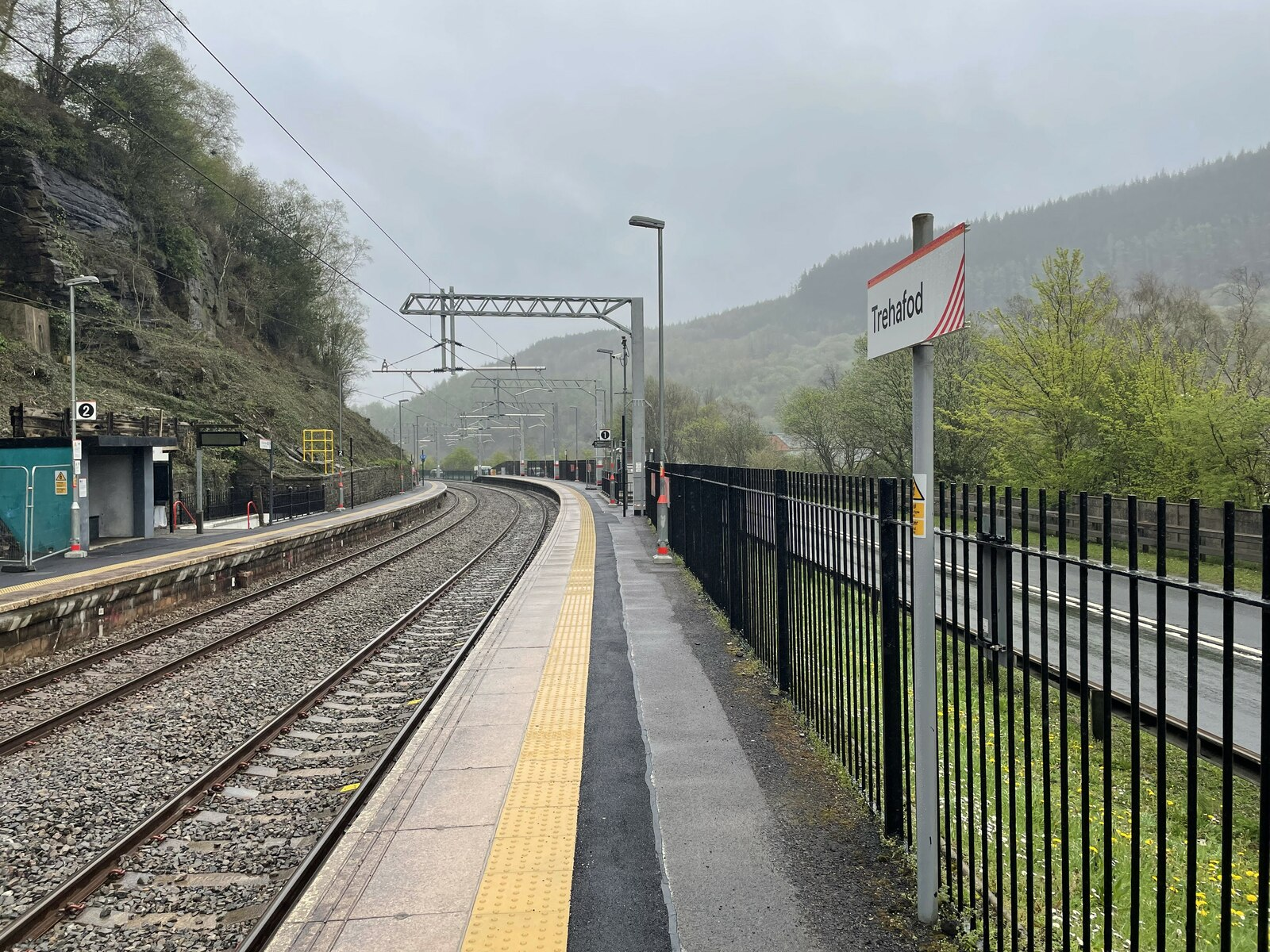

General information
- Location: Trehafod, Rhondda Cynon Taf; Wales
- Coordinates: 51.6101°N 3.3806°W
- Grid reference: ST045910
- Manager: Transport for Wales
- Platforms: 2

Other information
- Station code: TRH
- Classification: DfT category F2

History
- Original company: Taff Vale Railway
- Pre-grouping: Taff Vale Railway
- Post-grouping: Great Western Railway

Key dates
- 4 February 1861: First Station opened as Havod
- November 1890: Renamed Hafod
- 17 October 1892: resited
- 1 January 1905: Renamed Trehafod

Passengers
- 2021/22: ▲21,334
- 2022/23: ▲26,982
- 2023/24: ▼14,144
- 2024/25: ▲38,404
- 2025/26: ▲42,856
Location
Notes
- Passenger statistics from the Office of Rail and Road

Trehafod railway station is a railway station serving the village of Trehafod in Rhondda Cynon Taf, Wales. It is located on the Rhondda Line, between Pontypridd and Porth, 17 miles 41 chains (28.2 km) from Cardiff Docks (Bute Town).

== History ==
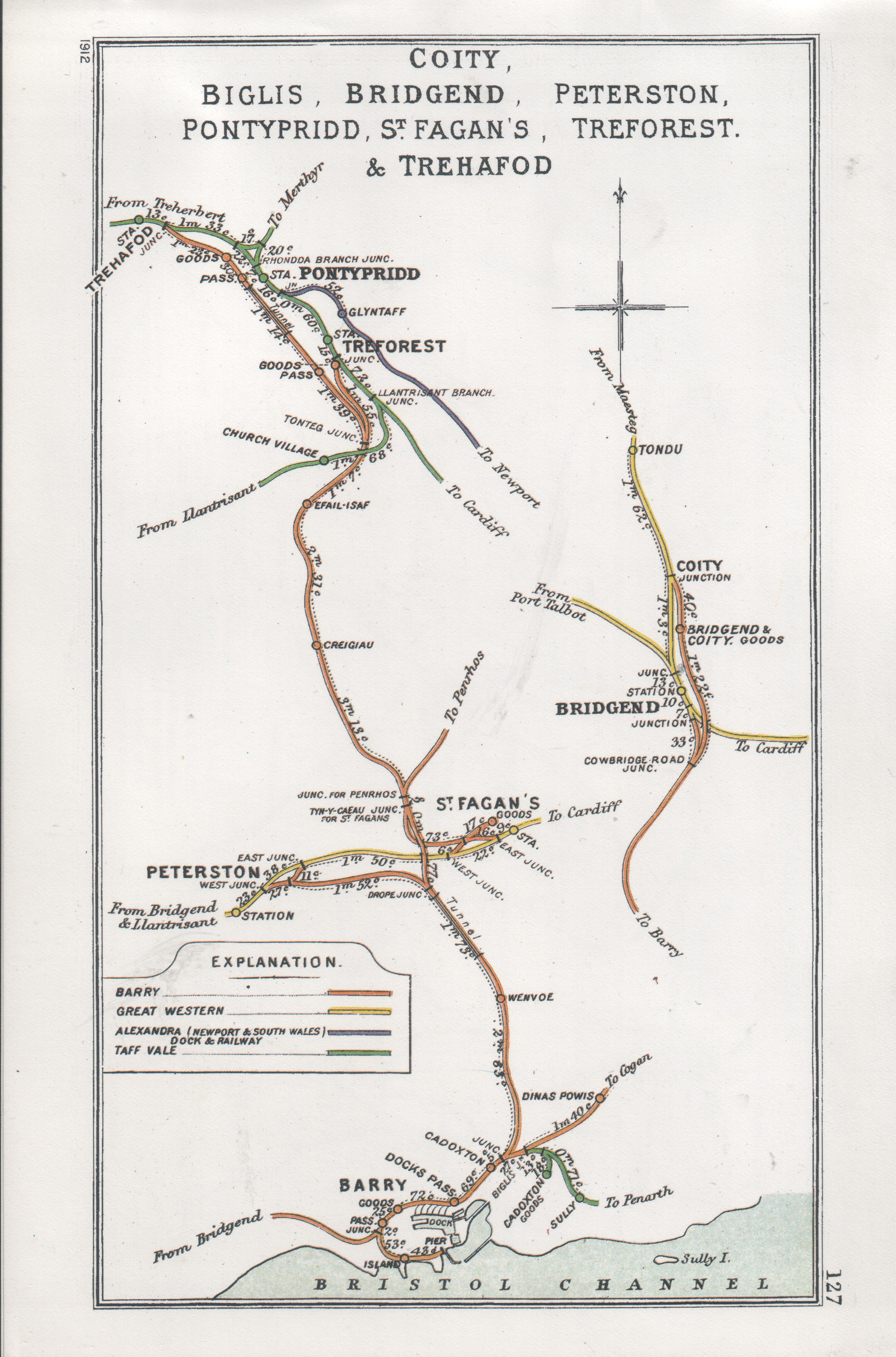
A 1912 Railway Clearing House Junction Diagram showing (left) railways in the vicinity of Trehafod (upper left)

The first station was opened by the Taff Vale Railway on 30 August 1861, and was originally named Havod. The Welsh spelling Hafod was adopted in November 1890. It was resited on 17 October 1892, and altered to Trehafod on 1 January 1905.

On 18 July 1889, the Barry Railway opened their main line between Hafod Junction and their new docks at Barry and immediately began carrying coal from the Rhondda pits along the new line. The route was not served by passenger trains until 16 March 1896, the new service running between Porth and Barry via Hafod and the Barry Railway's newly opened station at Pontypridd.

Passenger services along the Barry route were diverted via the former Taff Vale station at Pontypridd from 10 July 1930, but coal trains to Barry Docks continued to use the ex-Barry Railway route until June 1951 when they were diverted via Radyr.

== Facilities ==
The station has a ticket machine, a car park and bicycle spaces, waiting shelters and dot matrix departure screens. Access is via a subway and steps, although a ramp provides step-free access to the southbound platform.

== Passenger volume ==
Passenger Volume at Trehafod
	2002–03	2004–05	2005–06	2006–07	2007–08	2008–09	2009–10	2010–11	2011–12	2012–13	2013–14	2014–15	2015–16	2016–17	2017–18	2018–19	2019–20	2020–21	2021–22	2022–23
Entries and exits	29,847	27,769	25,483	28,761	27,270	29,156	29,348	31,498	33,290	31,874	31,092	31,704	34,318	37,312	38,416	38,010	34,660	7,048	21,334	26,982

The statistics cover twelve month periods that start in April.

== Services ==
Monday-Saturday, there is a half-hourly daytime service to Cardiff Central southbound and to Treherbert northbound, dropping to hourly in the evening. There is a two-hourly service in each direction on Sundays, with southbound trains running through to Barry Island. On 20 July 2018, previous franchise operator Arriva Trains Wales announced a trial period of extra Sunday services on the Rhondda Line to Cardiff and Barry Island. This was in response to a survey by Leanne Wood and the success of extra Sunday services on the Merthyr Line and the Rhymney Line.

The services from this station were suspended in Summer 2023, due to major route upgrade work being carried out at multiple locations as part of the Valley Lines electrification scheme. A replacement bus service operated between Pontypridd and Treherbert, calling at all local stations, until February 2024. Rail services resumed at the station on 26 February 2024 following completion of the majority of the infrastructure works.

Preceding station	National Rail	Following station
Pontypridd	Transport for Wales; Rhondda Line	Porth
	Disused railways	
Pontypridd Graig; Line and station closed	Barry Railway; Porth–Barry	Porth; Line and station open

== Bibliography ==
- Barrie, D S M (1983). The Barry Railway. Salisbury: Oakwood Press. ISBN 0-85361-236-6.
- Quick, Michael (2023). Railway Passenger Stations in Great Britain: A Chronology (PDF) (5th ed.). London: Railway and Canal Historical Society.
