= Ystradyfodwg =

Coordinates: 51°38′58″N 3°29′12″W

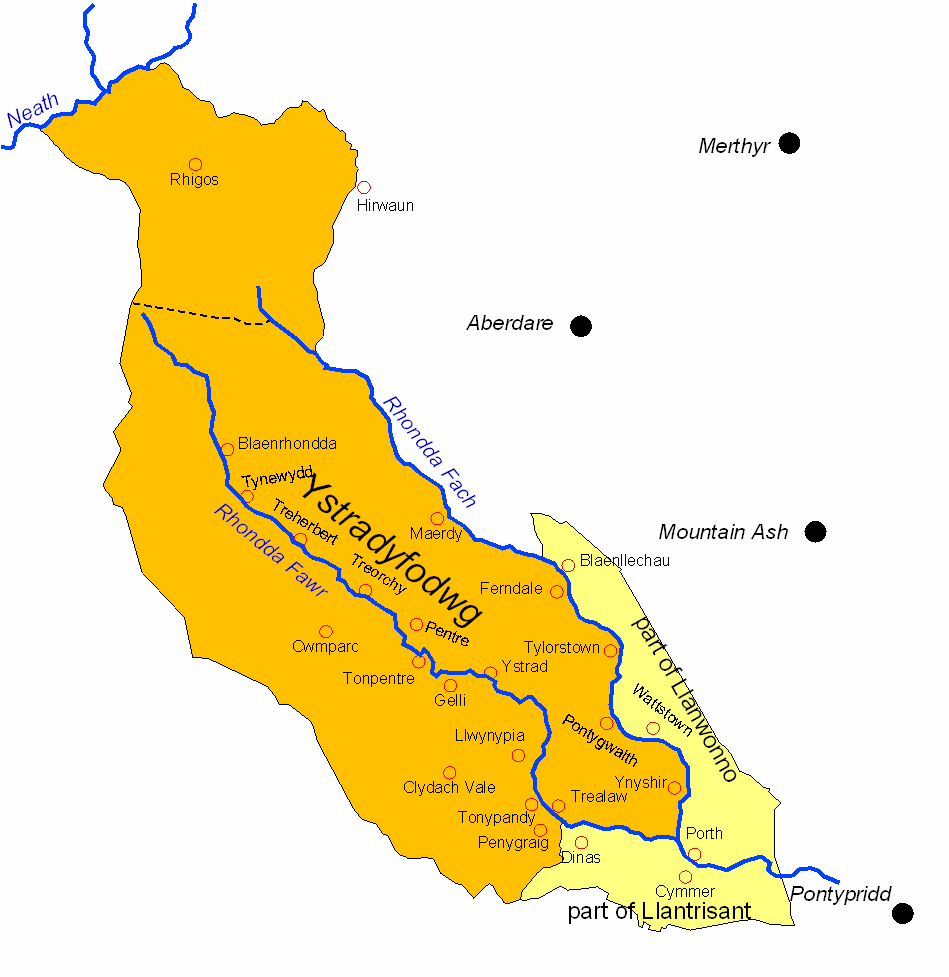
Map showing the boundaries of Ystradyfodwg ancient parish (orange) and the areas added and subtracted in the formation of Rhondda Urban District.

Ystradyfodwg or Ystrad Dyfodwg (Vale of Tyfodwg) was an ancient upland parish in Glamorgan, Wales. It is believed to have been named after Dyfodwg (or Tyfodwg) a 6th-century saint or chieftain. The parish included most of the area which would later be known as Rhondda named for the parish rivers, Rhondda Fawr and Rhondda Fach.

== Extent ==
The parish of Ystradyfodwg covered a vast area of 10,127 Hectares, but only had 542 inhabitants in 1801. It stretched from the confluence of the Rhondda rivers at Porth, over the mountain as far as the Vale of Neath. It was divided into four townships:

- Home (between the rivers)
- Clydach (south of the Rhondda Fawr)
- Middle (the upper part of the valley)
- Rhigos (north of the mountains).

== History ==
The small village of Ystradyfodwg was centred on its parish church, at the site now occupied by the church of St John the Baptist in Ton Pentre. Prior to the industrial revolution, Ton Pentre (then just called Ton) was a hamlet a short distance to the west of Ystradyfodwg, but as Ton grew it absorbed the older village. A railway station opened at Ystradyfodwg in 1861 on the Taff Vale Railway's Rhondda branch line, with the station initially called Ystrad. It was renamed Ystrad Rhondda in 1930, and renamed Ton Pentre in 1986 when a new Ystrad Rhondda railway station also opened about a mile further down the line to the east.

A local government district, governed by a local board, was established in 1877 covering most of the parish of Ystradyfodwg, but excluding the Rhigos area. The district was enlarged in 1879 to cover parts of the neighbouring parishes of Llanwonno and Llantrisant. The Ystradyfodwg Local Board built itself a headquarters on Llewellyn Street in Pentre in 1884.

The local government district became the Ystradyfodwg Urban District in 1894, when the parish boundaries were also adjusted to match the urban district. In 1897 the Ystradyfodwg Urban District Council formally changed the name of the parish and urban district from Ystradyfodwg to Rhondda.

== Development ==
The area would become better known in the mid 19th century a dynamic centre of the coal mining industry, with a large, new industrial population. During the 19th century, the population of the parish increased as follows:

	1811	1821	1831	1841	1851	1861	1871	1881	1891	1901
Population	973	985	1047	1363	1998	3857	17777	45052	69685	89907

Lower-quality coal from the Upper Coal series was worked in a small way in Trealaw as early as 1807, but the development of the Rhondda steam coal gave rise to the rapid population growth. The development began with the start-up of the Bute Merthyr colliery in Treherbert in 1855. In the Rhondda Fach, the first coal was mined in 1862 at Ferndale. The Taff Vale Railway reached Treherbert in 1856. Collieries then rapidly developed along the valley, with the lower part of the valley developing last because of the deeper pits required to find the steam coal in that area. By the end of the century, mining villages formed an almost continuous urban strip along both valley floors, with coal mining and its ancillary trades virtually the sole industry.

The majority of the incomers came from West Wales, particularly Carmarthenshire and Ceredigion and spoke Welsh. Over 70% of the population of the parish was Welsh-speaking in 1891.

In 1877, the Hamlet of Rhigos was made a separate civil parish, and the remainder of Ystradyfodwg, together with the adjoining Rhondda valley portions of the parishes of Llanwonno and Llantrisant, became the urban sanitary district of Ystradyfodwg. This extended district became Ystradyfodwg Civil Parish and Urban District in 1894, and was renamed Rhondda Civil Parish and Urban District in 1897. See Rhondda (district).

== See also ==
- 1894 Ystradyfodwg Urban District Council election
