= Ystrad Rhondda railway station =

Railway station in Rhondda Cynon Taf, Wales

Ystrad Rhondda
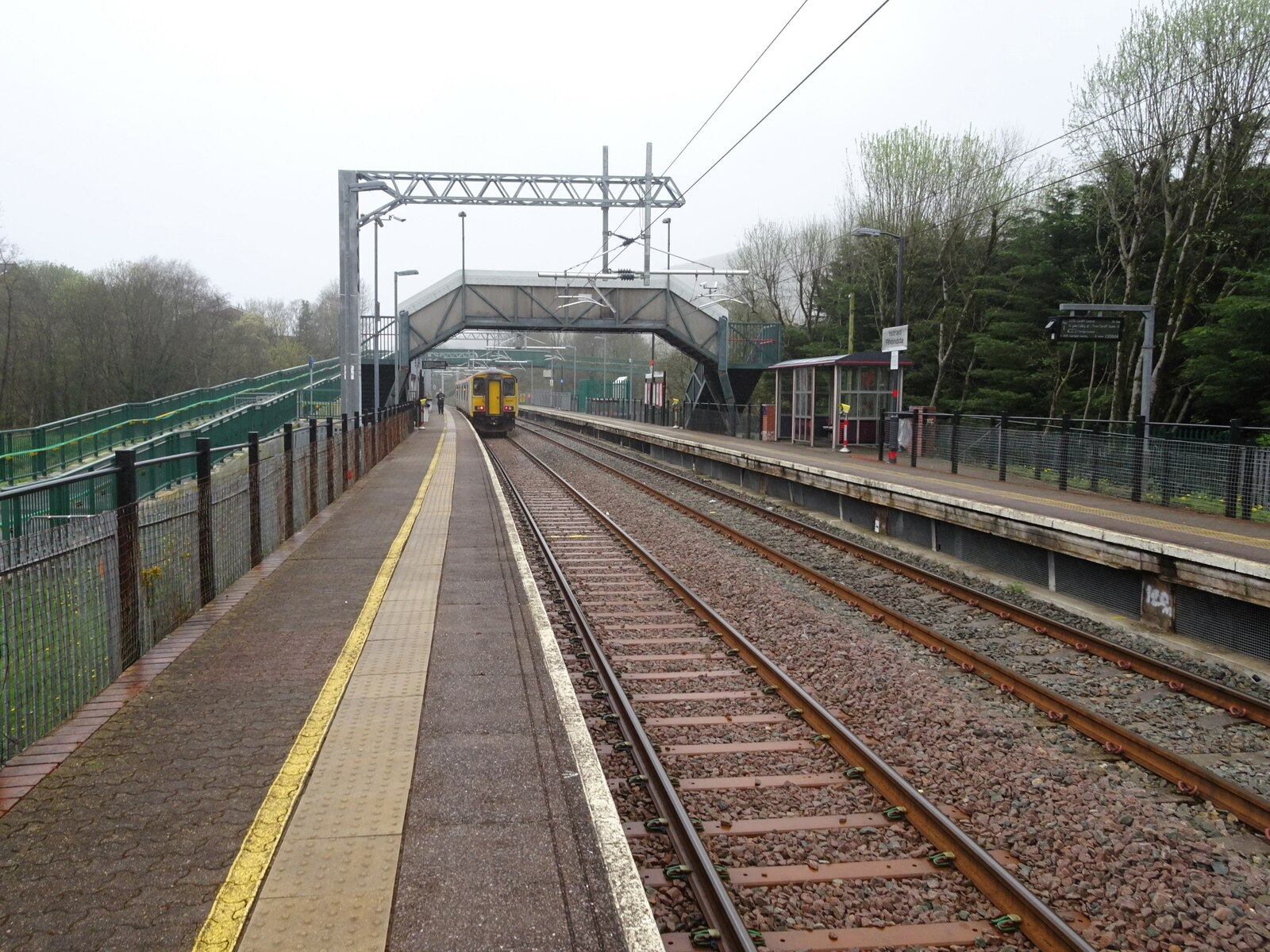
- Ystrad Rhondda station in April 2024

General information
- Location: Ystrad, Rhondda Cynon Taf; Wales
- Coordinates: 51°38′37″N 3°28′00″W
- Grid reference: SS986948
- Owner: Network Rail
- Operator: Transport for Wales Rail
- Manager: Transport for Wales Rail
- Platforms: 2

Other information
- Station code: YSR
- Classification: DfT category F1

History
- Opened: 1986
- Original company: British Rail
- Pre-grouping: Built on former Taff Vale Railway route

Key dates
- 1856: Original Taff Vale Railway line opened to Treherbert
- 1972-1981: Line singled by British Rail
- 20 July 2018: Enhanced Sunday services introduced
- April 2023: Services suspended for South Wales Metro electrification
- 26 February 2024: Services resumed following electrification works

Passengers
- 2020/21: ▼9,320
- 2021/22: ▲34,096
- 2022/23: ▲41,016
- 2023/24: ▼18,826
- 2024/25: ▲55,836
Location
Notes
- Passenger statistics from the Office of Rail and Road

Ystrad Rhondda railway station is a railway station serving Ystrad in Rhondda Cynon Taf, Wales. It is located on the Rhondda Line, between Llywynypia and Ton Pentre, 20 miles 5 chains (32.3 km) from Cardiff Docks (Bute Town). Alphabetically, it is the last station in the UK with the first being Abbey Wood station in southeast London.

== History ==
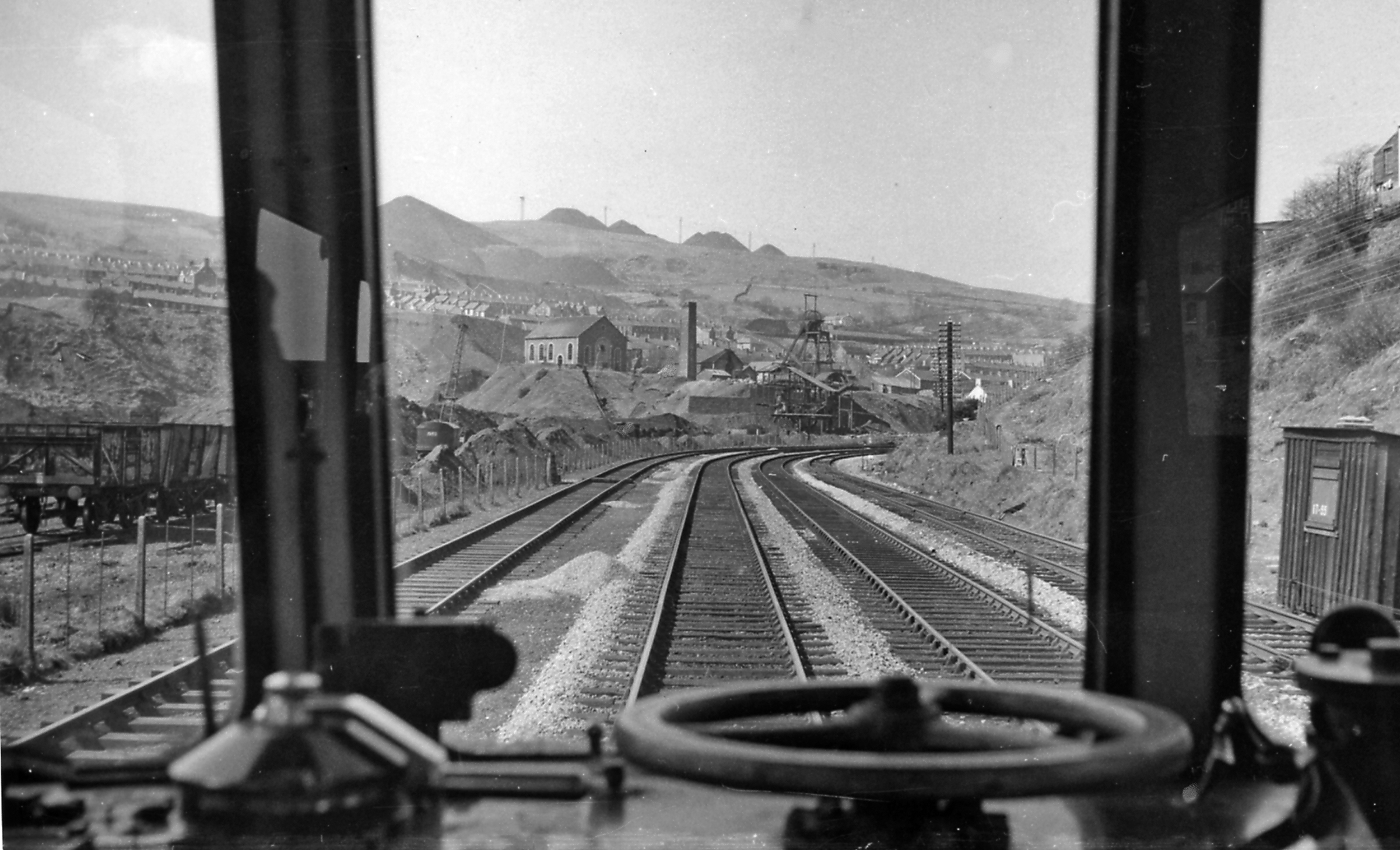
View from a DMU going up the Rhondda Valley in 1962

It was first opened on this site by British Rail on the former Taff Vale Railway in 1986 and is the location of the only passing loop on the section of route north of Porth, which had previously been singled by British Rail in stages between 1972 and 1981.

The current station replaced an earlier station of the same name when it opened in 1986. The original Ystrad station, which had operated since 1861, was renamed Ton Pentre when the new Ystrad Rhondda station opened approximately one mile further east along the line. This change reflected the continued development of the Rhondda Valley's railway infrastructure and the need to better serve the local community.

The station was built on the route of the former Taff Vale Railway, which had originally reached Treherbert in 1856. The Taff Vale Railway's Rhondda branch had been instrumental in the development of the South Wales coalfield, providing essential transport links for both coal extraction and passenger services to the valley communities.

=== South Wales Metro transformation ===
Ystrad Rhondda station was significantly affected by the South Wales Metro electrification programme, with services suspended from April 2023 to February 2024 to enable major infrastructure upgrades. The closure allowed for the installation of 25kV AC overhead electrification equipment along the Treherbert line and the replacement of the century-old token signalling system with modern electronic signalling.

During the closure period, a replacement bus service operated every 30 minutes between Pontypridd and Treherbert. The transformation works were part of a £1 billion investment in the South Wales Metro, described as the largest and most complex engineering project taking place in Wales.

The Treherbert line was electrified in May 2024, and the first electric train services began operating in November 2024 using new Stadler Class 756 tri-mode trains. These modern trains feature improved capacity, air conditioning, Wi-Fi, and passenger information screens, representing a significant upgrade from the previous diesel rolling stock.

== Station buildings and facilities ==
Ystrad Rhondda station features a modest single-storey building typical of British Rail's 1980s construction standards. The station has basic facilities including a seated waiting area but lacks many amenities found at larger stations. There is no ticket office, with passengers required to purchase tickets from conductors on trains or use alternative arrangements. The station does not have toilets, a waiting room, or commercial facilities.

Both platforms are equipped with basic shelters and passenger information displays. Platform 1 serves southbound trains towards Pontypridd and Cardiff, whilst Platform 2 serves northbound trains towards Treherbert. The platforms are connected by a standard footbridge, with step-free access available to Platform 1 via the station car park. Access to Platform 2 requires use of the footbridge, though an alternative accessible route exists via the Brook Street footbridge, although this has restrictions for wheelchair users. The station provides cycle storage with three Sheffield stands accommodating up to six bicycles, located near the entrance to the southbound platform.

== Operational significance ==
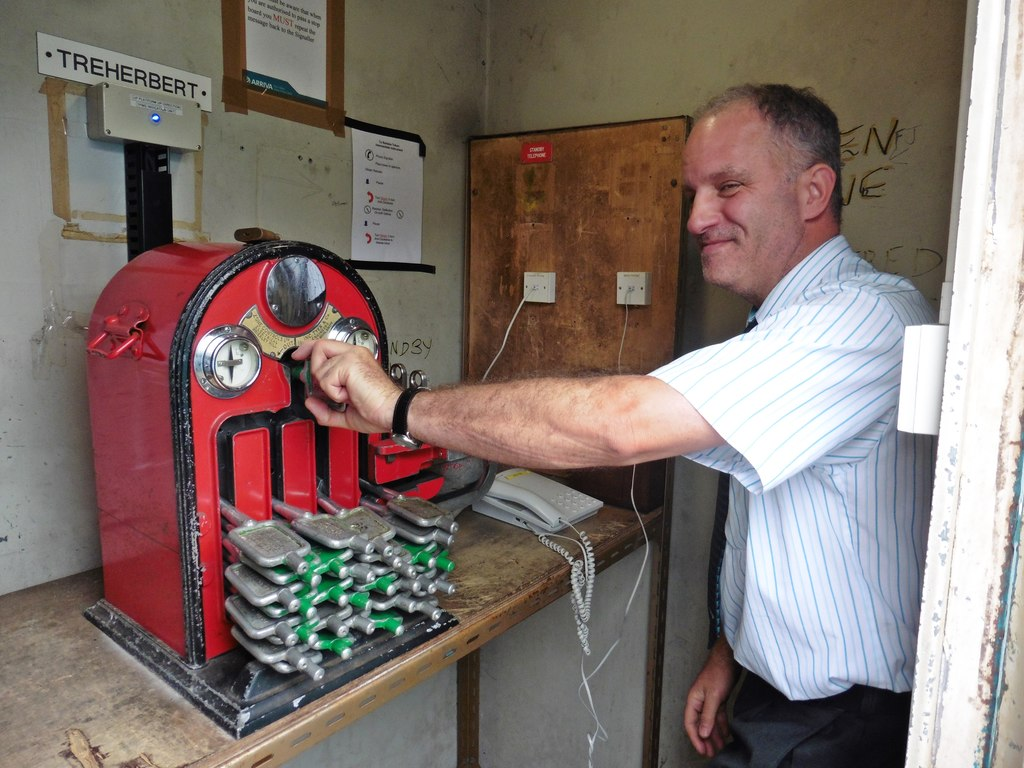
The token exchange box at Ystrad Rhondda Railway Station. It was retired as part of the 2023-24 South Wales Metro modernisation programme

The station serves a crucial operational role on the Rhondda Line as the location of the only passing loop north of Porth. This infrastructure enables trains to pass each other on what is otherwise a single-track railway, facilitating the half-hourly service pattern that operates on the line. The passing loop was constructed as part of the station's development in 1986, following the singling of the line between 1972 and 1981.

The loop operates automatically under the token system, with train crews operating the token machines for the two single-line sections under remote supervision from the signalling centre at Radyr. This system was replaced during the 2023-24 closure as part of the South Wales Metro modernisation programme, which saw the installation of new electronic signalling equipment to replace the decades-old token exchange system.

== Passenger volume ==
Passenger Volume at Ystrad Rhondda
	2002–03	2004–05	2005–06	2006–07	2007–08	2008–09	2009–10	2010–11	2011–12	2012–13	2013–14	2014–15	2015–16	2016–17	2017–18	2018–19	2019–20	2020–21	2021–22	2022–23
Entries and exits	91,313	49,335	42,414	49,434	72,507	79,448	89,868	71,720	75,304	65,808	52,098	50,992	44,600	56,398	52,532	48,906	45,044	9,320	34,096	41,016

The statistics cover twelve month periods that start in April.

== Services ==
Monday-Saturday, there is a half-hourly service to Pontypridd & Cardiff Central southbound and to Treherbert northbound. There is a two hourly service in each direction on Sundays, with through trains southbound to Barry Island. On 20 July 2018, previous franchise operator Arriva Trains Wales announced a trial period of extra Sunday services on the Rhondda Line to Cardiff and Barry Island. This was in response to a survey by Leanne Wood and the success of extra Sunday services on the Merthyr Line and the Rhymney Line. Following the reopening in February 2024, the station is served by Transport for Wales Rail with both diesel and electric services.

Preceding station	National Rail	Following station
Llwynypia	Transport for Wales; Rhondda Line	Ton Pentre

== Bibliography ==
- Quick, Michael (2023). Railway Passenger Stations in Great Britain: A Chronology (PDF) (5th ed.). London: Railway and Canal Historical Society.
