= Dinas Rhondda =

Coordinates: 51.61948°N 3.43073°W

Dinas
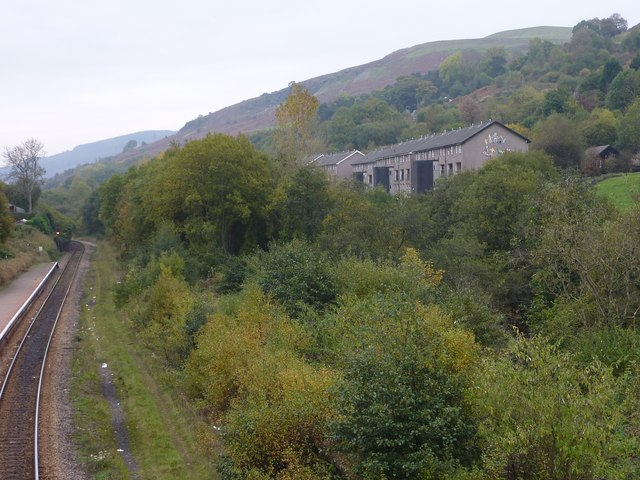

- Location within Rhondda Cynon Taf
- OS grid reference: ST007917
- Principal area: Rhondda Cynon Taf
- Preserved county: Mid Glamorgan
- Country: Wales
- Sovereign state: United Kingdom
- Post town: PORTH
- Postcode district: CF39
- Post town: TONYPANDY
- Postcode district: CF40
- Dialling code: 01443
- Police: South Wales
- Fire: South Wales
- Ambulance: Welsh
- UK Parliament: Rhondda
- Senedd Cymru – Welsh Parliament: Rhondda

Dinas is a village near Tonypandy in the county borough of Rhondda Cynon Taf, Wales. Dinas is often referred to as Dinas Rhondda to avoid confusion with Dinas Powys in the Vale of Glamorgan. The word dinas in Modern Welsh means "city", but here (as in Old and Middle Welsh more generally) it means "hill fort".

== Location ==
Dinas is located in the lower Rhondda Valley about halfway between Treorchy and Pontypridd. Neighbouring settlements are Penygraig, Trealaw, Tonypandy, Cymmer and Porth.

== The colliery ==
Dinas is the site of Dinas Lower (Dinas Isaf/Dinas Ishaf) Colliery, sunk by Walter Coffin in 1812 as the first deep coal mine in the Rhondda valley. This was later followed by the sinking of the Dinas Middle Colliery in 1832 along the southern banks of the river Rhondda Fawr, opposite Dinas Rhondda railway station. From here coal was carried by trams via Porth, Cymmer, and Trehafod to Pontypridd, where it was conveyed by canal to Cardiff. In 1844 there was an explosion in the mine, the first major explosion to occur in the Rhondda Valleys, and twelve men and boys were killed. In 1869, a new shaft was opened in order to improve conditions in the pit. Ten years later another devastating explosion resulted in the death of 63 miners. The shaft was deepened in 1881 to reach lower seams with steam coal, but by 1887 production was declining and in 1893 production had ceased in both collieries.

In 1841 the 4-mile long Rhondda branch line of the Taff Vale Railway was opened between Pontypridd and Dinas, eventually to be extended as far as Treherbert by 1856.
