= Porth railway station =

Railway station in Rhonda Cynon Taff, Wales

Porth
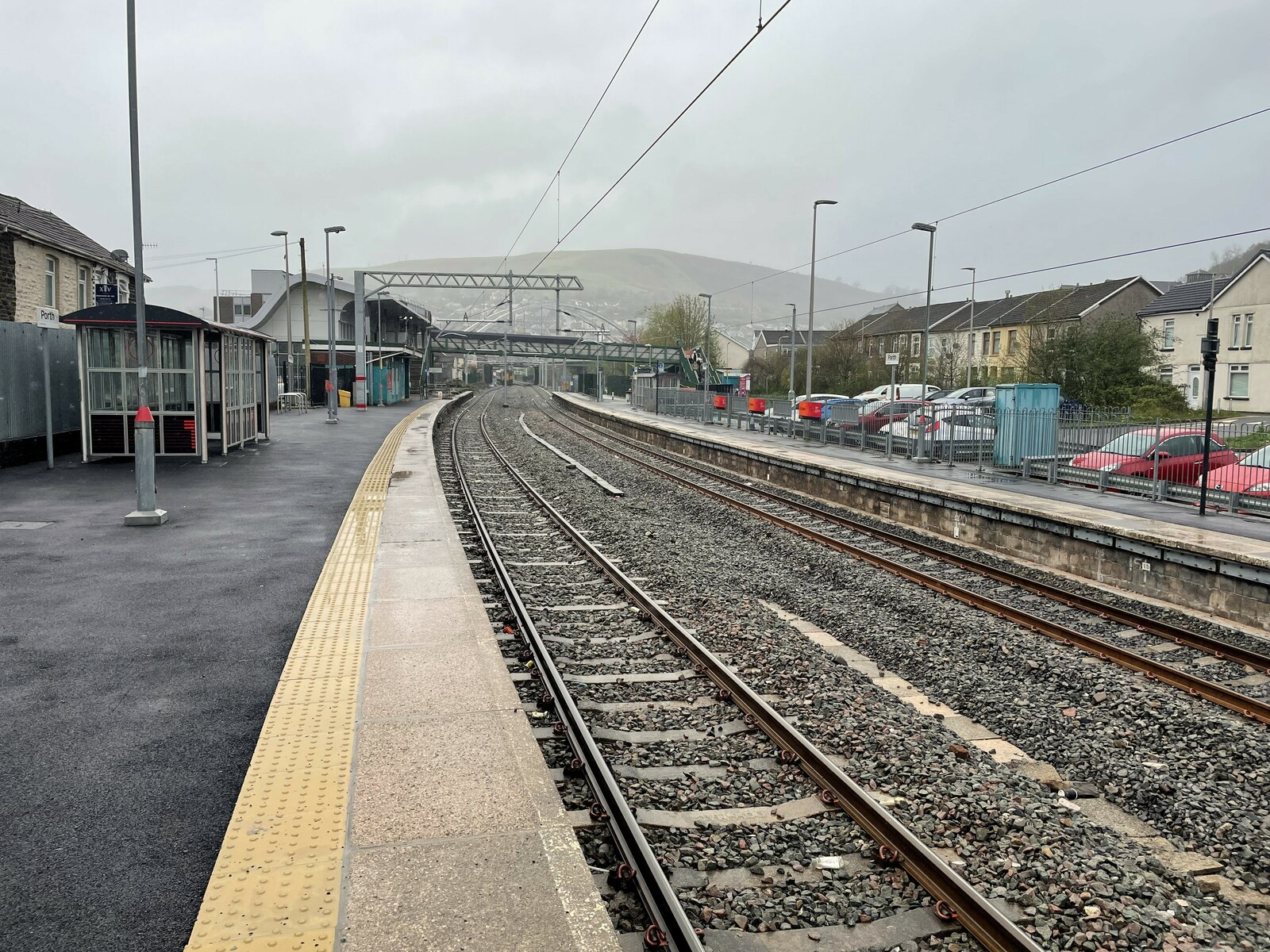

General information
- Location: Porth, Rhondda Cynon Taf; Wales
- Coordinates: 51.6124°N 3.4075°W
- Grid reference: ST025913
- Manager: Transport for Wales
- Platforms: 2

Other information
- Station code: POR
- Classification: DfT category D

History
- Opened: 1876
- Original company: Taff Vale Railway
- Pre-grouping: Taff Vale Railway
- Post-grouping: Great Western Railway

Key dates
- 4 February 1861: First station opened
- 1 July 1876: Station resited

Passengers
- 2020/21: ▼35,772
- 2021/22: ▲0.123 million
- 2022/23: ▲0.152 million
- 2023/24: ▼75,888
- 2024/25: ▲0.225 million
Location
Notes
- Passenger statistics from the Office of Rail and Road

Porth railway station is a railway station serving the town of Porth in Rhondda Cynon Taf, Wales. It is located on the Rhondda Line, between Trehafod and Dinas Rhondda, 16 miles 9 chains (25.9 km) from Cardiff Docks (Bute Town).

== History ==
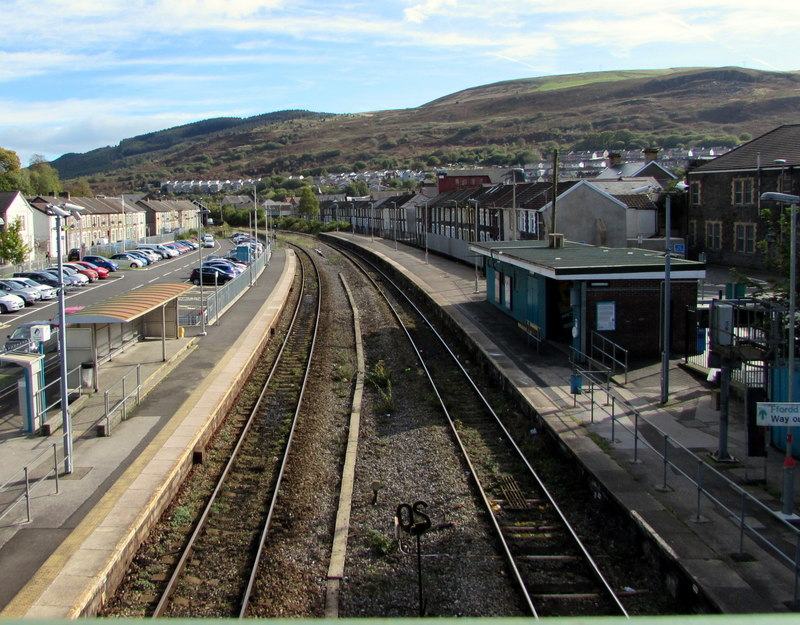
The station in October 2017, before electrification

The original station was opened on 4 February 1861 by the Taff Vale Railway; the line had been open since 10 June 1841. On 1 July 1876, the original station was closed, being replaced by a new one to the south of the junction with the Maerdy line. The line to Treherbert was singled north of here in 1981 and most of the 1876 station buildings were replaced in 1984–85.

A passenger service between Porth and Barry was introduced by the Barry Railway on 16 March 1896, running via Pontypridd Graig and Treforest High Level, but this ended in 1930 when the service was re-routed via the TVR station at Pontypridd.

An unusual ground level signal box was installed at the station when the Treherbert line was reduced to single track, replacing a much more substantial TVR structure. This holds the distinction of the being the last new mechanical box to be built by British Rail.

== Facilities ==
The station has a ticket office and ticket machine, a car park and bicycle spaces, toilets, waiting shelters and dot matrix departure screens. There is some step free access from the street, and between the platforms using the footbridge.

== Passenger volume ==
Passenger Volume at Porth
	2004–05	2005–06	2006–07	2007–08	2008–09	2009–10	2010–11	2011–12	2012–13	2013–14	2014–15	2015–16	2016–17	2017–18	2018–19	2019–20	2020–21	2021–22	2022–23
Entries and exits	315,402	293,184	271,147	279,789	284,040	299,430	297,554	298,258	302,886	307,254	313,730	313,692	341,742	355,330	344,100	310,670	35,772	122,578	151,692

The statistics cover twelve month periods that start in April.

== Services ==
Monday-Saturday, there is a half-hourly service to Cardiff Central via Pontypridd and Cardiff Queen Street southbound and to Treherbert northbound, serving all stations en route except Trefforest Estate. This drops to hourly in the late evening. There is a two-hourly service in each direction on Sundays, with through trains to Barry Island. On 20 July 2018, previous franchise operator Arriva Trains Wales announced a trial period of extra Sunday services on the Rhondda Line to Cardiff and Barry Island. This was in response to a survey by Leanne Wood and the success of extra Sunday services on the Merthyr Line and the Rhymney Line.

The services from this station were suspended in Summer 2023, due to major route upgrade work being carried out at multiple locations as part of the Valley Lines electrification scheme. A replacement bus service operated between Pontypridd and Treherbert, calling at all local stations, until February 2024. Rail services resumed at the station on 26 February 2024 following completion of the majority of the infrastructure works.

Preceding station	National Rail	Following station
Trehafod	Transport for Wales; Rhondda Line	Dinas Rhondda
	Historical railways	
Trehafod; Line and station open	Barry Railway; Porth–Barry	Terminus
	Disused railways	
Trehafod; Line and station open	Taff Vale Railway; Maerdy Branch	Ynyshir; Line and station closed

== Bibliography ==
- Butt, R. V. J. (1995). The Directory of Railway Stations. Yeovil: Patrick Stephens Ltd. ISBN 1-85260-508-1.
- Quick, Michael (2023). Railway Passenger Stations in Great Britain: A Chronology (PDF) (5th ed.). London: Railway and Canal Historical Society.
