= Ton Pentre =

Coordinates: 51.6461°N 3.4868°W

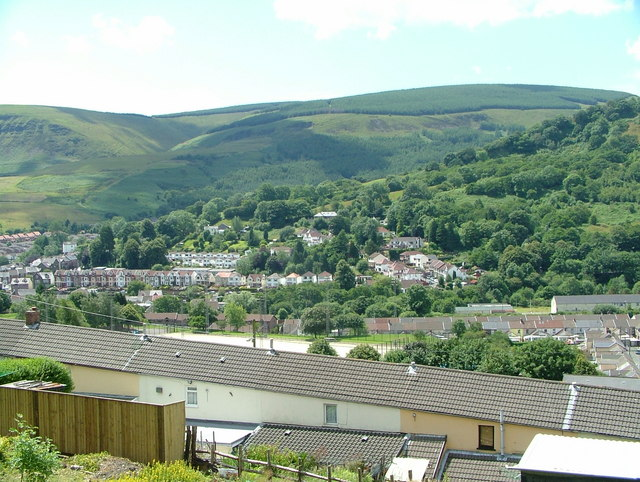

- Location within Rhondda Cynon Taf
- Population: 1,028 (2004)est
- OS grid reference: SS975953
- Principal area: Rhondda Cynon Taf
- Preserved county: Mid Glamorgan
- Country: Wales
- Sovereign state: United Kingdom
- Post town: Pentre
- Postcode district: CF41
- Dialling code: 01443
- Police: South Wales
- Fire: South Wales
- Ambulance: Welsh
- UK Parliament: Rhondda
- Senedd Cymru – Welsh Parliament: Rhondda

Ton Pentre is a village in the Rhondda Valley in the county borough of Rhondda Cynon Taf, Wales. Historically part of Glamorgan, Ton Pentre, a former industrial coal mining village, is a district of the community of Pentre. The old district of Ystradyfodwg was named after the church at Ton Pentre. Ton Pentre is, perhaps, best known for an event in 1924, when the Duke of York (later George VI of the United Kingdom) played a round of golf with Trade Unionist Frank Hodges.

== Early and industrial history ==
One of the earliest recorded settlements in Ton Pentre is an Iron Age hillfort located at Maindy Camp. Although initially believed to have been from the Bronze Age, the camp was misidentified due to items from a Bronze Age cairn that were found inside the camp perimeter.

The area on which Ton Pentre now stands was originally the site of a cluster of platform houses or hafodi; small farming buildings, occupied only during the summer months. The site was later settled by a farm and a few cottages, known as 'Y Ton' ('meadow') the site was owned by absentee landlord Crawshay Bailey. To distinguish the area from nearby Tonypandy, it became known as Ton Pentre.

When it became viable to mine anthracite coal in deep shaft pits in the mid-19th century, many pits were sunk in the Rhondda valley, one of which was located in Ton Pentre - the Maindy Colliery. It was the individual collieries that were at the heart of the separate 'villages' that emerged on the valley floor as they were the major employers in the area. At the height of the mining industry, Ton Pentre was home to a few thousand people living in high-density terraced houses that spanned the whole valley.

=== David Davies and his last half crown ===
The largest colliery in the area, Maindy Colliery, was established in Ton Pentre when the first mine was sunk by David Davies & Partners in 1864.

Davies had rented land in the Rhondda Fawr and had searched for a workable seam for 15 months. When he had finally run out of money he gathered his workforce together and paid them their final wages. Digging his hand into his pocket he took out a single half crown saying, "There you are. That's all I've got". Someone in the crowd replied, "'We'll have that as well" and Davies impulsively threw his last coin into the crowd. Impressed by this gesture, with no pay, the men agreed to continue working. On the seventh day of digging, a "massive seam of the best-quality steam coal" was finally found.

The mine was near closure in 1866 when the new Six Feet seam was discovered. This sustained production of coal until 1948, when mining ceased at the colliery, though it remained open as a ventilation shaft for other mines.

== Present day Ton Pentre ==
The village itself has seen a marked decline in commerce and industry associated with the area since the demise of the coal industry. This has also been a contributory factor in the social deprivation that has stricken the area and leaves the South Wales Valleys with high unemployment.

However, recent regeneration is changing the fortunes of the area. The influence of the M4 corridor and the economic boom in Cardiff has meant that the Rhondda valleys are increasingly becoming commuter zones for the Cardiff and Swansea districts.

== Notable buildings and structures ==
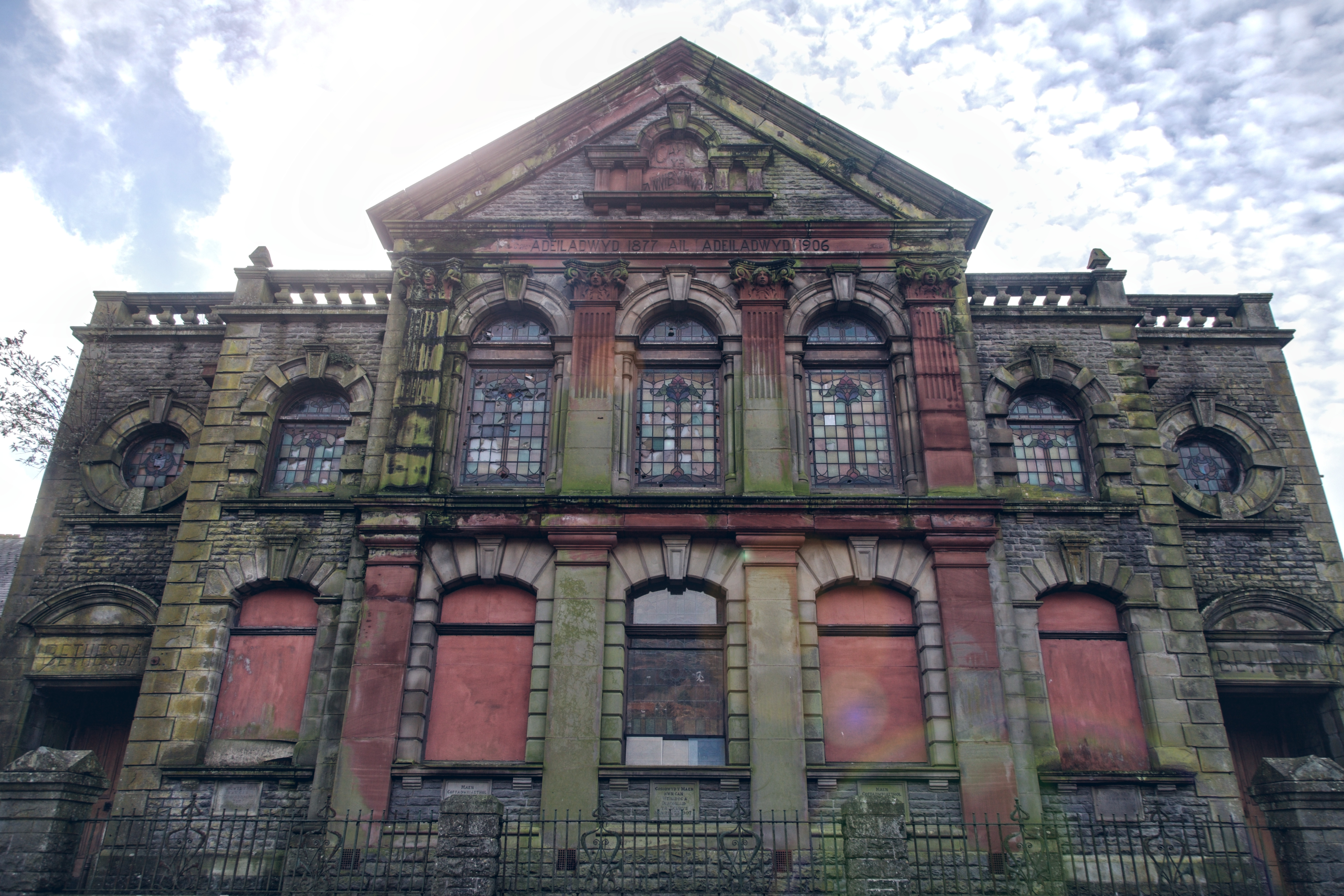
Bethesda Chapel in 2019

Ton Pentre Workingmen's Hall and Institute is a Grade II listed building, once a miners' institute but now a cinema called the Phoenix. The original building was constructed in 1895 next to the Crawshay Bailey Estate Office on Church Road. The Institute was built from subscriptions from the Maindy and Eastern collieries, and originally the Institute took the name of both pits. The building consisted of a library, news room, refreshment room and committee room, along with other functional areas. A theatre hall was added to the institute in 1904 designed by architect Jacob Hall. In 1908 the hall was rented out to a private company for showing early silent movies. In 1931 the hall was upgraded to allow the playing of talkies, and continued as a cinema until 1971, when it became a bingo hall. It was closed in 1989 and was derelict for two years until it reopened as 'The Phoenix' in 1991.

Bethesda Chapel on Pryce Street, was a Congregationalist chapel built in 1877 and rebuilt and enlarged in 1906. The building once seated over 1,000 people, but by 1988 the congregation had fallen to 11. The chapel is currently undergoing restoration.

The foundation stone of St David's Church, now Church in Wales, was laid in 1880.

== Notable people ==
See Category:People from Pentre

== Transport links ==
The village is served by Ton Pentre railway station, originally part of the Taff Vale Railway, it is now on the Rhondda Line which links the village to Cardiff.

== See also ==
Ton Pentre Football Club
