= Trehafod =

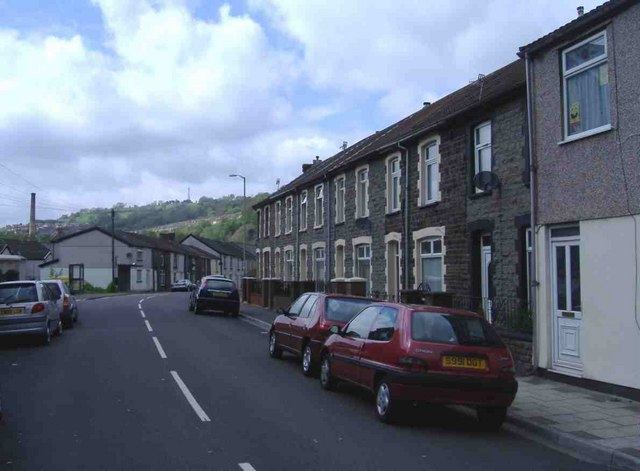

- Location within Rhondda Cynon Taf
- Population: 698 (2011)
- OS grid reference: ST044909
- Principal area: Rhondda Cynon Taf
- Preserved county: Mid Glamorgan
- Country: Wales
- Sovereign state: United Kingdom
- Post town: PONTYPRIDD
- Postcode district: CF37
- Dialling code: 01443
- Police: South Wales
- Fire: South Wales
- Ambulance: Welsh
- UK Parliament: Rhondda and Pontypridd
- Senedd Cymru – Welsh Parliament: Rhondda and Pontypridd
- List of places UK Wales Rhondda Cynon Taf 51.6096°N 3.3811°W Community map: Map of the community

Trehafod is a village and community in the Rhondda Valley, between Porth and Pontypridd in the county borough of Rhondda Cynon Taf, Wales, with a population of 698 in the 2011 census.(The earlier name Hafod was altered in 1905 to avoid confusion with Hafod near Swansea. Until then, Trehafod (first record of the name is found in 1851) had been part of Hafod).

Administratively, Trehafod is split between the electoral division of Cymmer (Rhondda) to the west and Rhondda (Pontypridd) to the east. A former coalmining community, the village is now the site of the Rhondda Heritage Park, a tourist attraction commemorating the Rhondda Valley's coalmining culture and local history.

Spelling variants found in the past are Trehavod (an English spelling, using "v" instead of "f") and Trefhafod (a hypercorrect Welsh form, using the conservative literary form "tref" instead of the colloquial, and more modern literary form, "tre").

== History ==
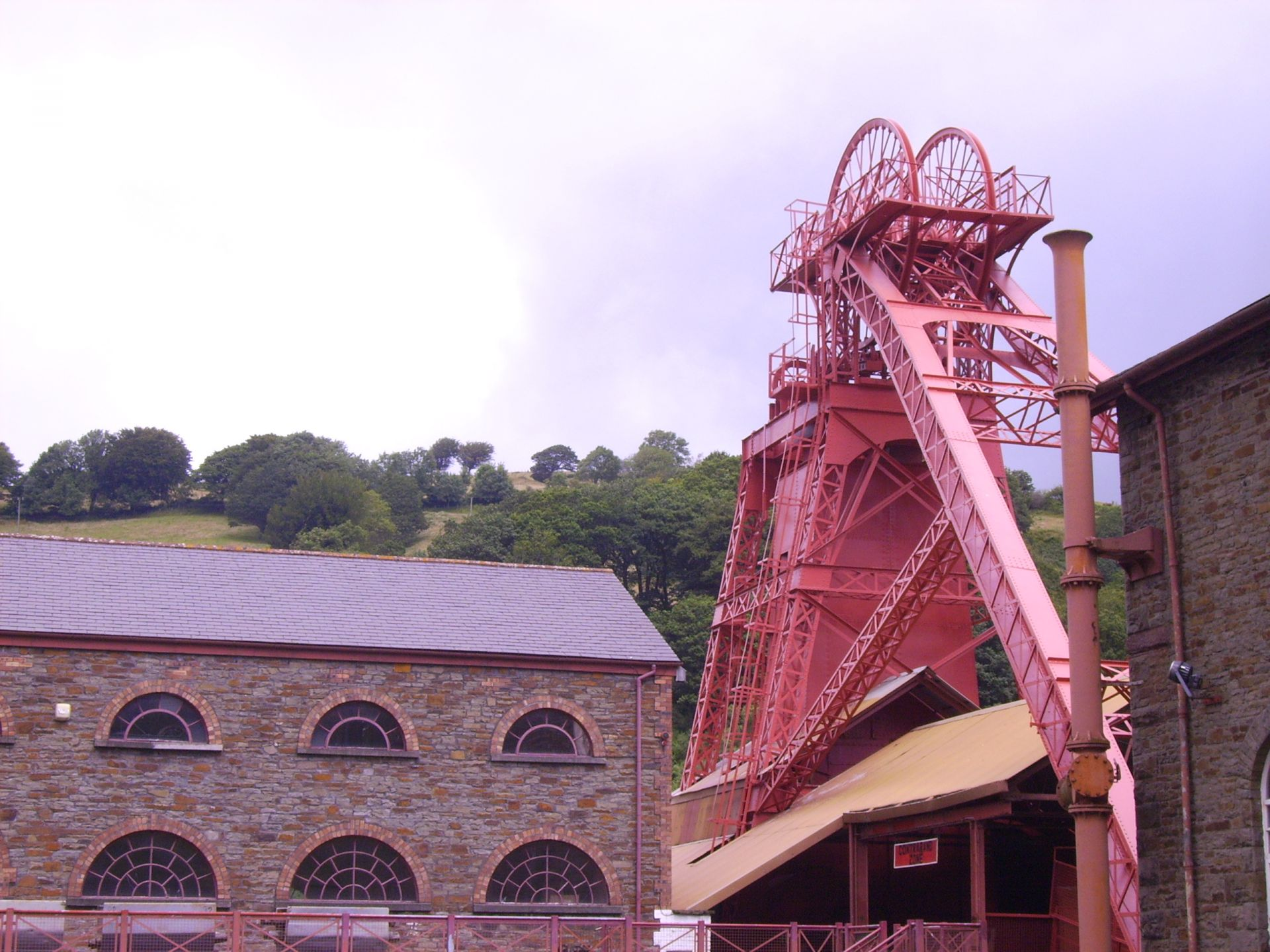
The Lewis Merthyr Colliery now part of the Rhondda Heritage Park

The 1847 tithe map of the area shows a number of farms on the area that was to become Trehafod; these were named Hafod Uchaf, Hafod Ganol, and Hafod Fawr. It was from these farms that Trehafod was to take its name.

"Hafod" is a Welsh word literally meaning "summer dwelling", and refers to an upland farm (from the practice of taking cattle up the hillside from the valley floor to graze in the summer months) (haf = summer, bod = dwelling, with soft mutation of [b] to [v] of the second element (bod) after a noun used as an adjective equivalent in attributive position (haf)).

Tre (literally “town”) was used in the eighteen-hundreds in industrial areas for a street or streets of workers’ housing (equivalent to English “town” or “ville”, which are used similarly).

Trehafod railway station lies on the Rhondda Line which follows the River Rhondda. The railway line and river border the village on either side.

Trehafod is now most famous for the Rhondda Heritage Park, formerly known as the Lewis Merthyr Colliery, which at the peak time for coal mining production was one of the most productive collieries in the South Wales Coalfield.

Trehafod also boasts Barry Sidings Countryside Park, which is known colloquially as "the lakes" in reference to the park's two ponds. Barry Sidings is a popular destination for local families and dog walkers; its features include nature paths, a small waterfall, ducks, carp, frogs, and a café. Largely situated in Trehafod, the park feeds into Pontypridd and is frequented by walkers heading there.

=== Flooding ===
The village has frequently suffered flooding from the river, the most serious of which claimed the life of an Afon Street resident in 1960. (Afon is Welsh for 'river'.) Flooding also occurred in 1921, 1929, and 1979, after which the Rhondda River bank was reinforced. "The 1979 flood overtopped the banks of the River Rhondda just downriver from Trehafod, and floodwaters entered the low-lying areas of Colliery Street and Great Street, flooding many properties. A major river improvement scheme was completed in 1985, but the village has still suffered significant flooding since, including in February 2020.
