= Treherbert railway station =

Railway station in Rhondda Cynon Taf, Wales

Treherbert
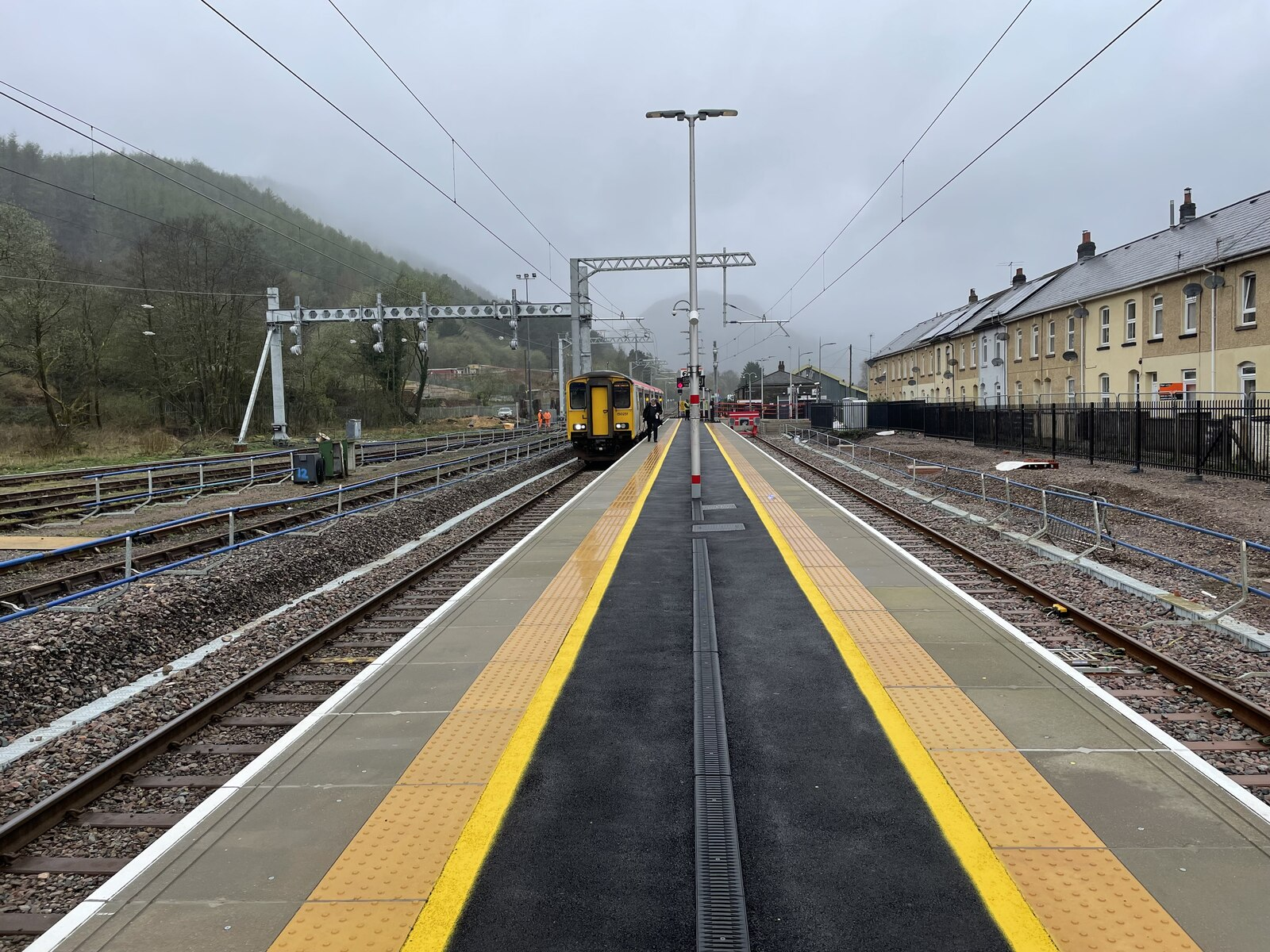
- Treherbert station in April 2024

General information
- Location: Treherbert, Rhondda Cynon Taf; Wales
- Coordinates: 51°40′18″N 3°32′08″W
- Grid reference: SS938981
- Manager: Transport for Wales
- Platforms: 2

Other information
- Station code: TRB
- Classification: DfT category F1

History
- Opened: 1863

Passengers
- 2020/21: ▼27,518
- 2021/22: ▲95,984
- 2022/23: ▲0.121 million
- 2023/24: ▼68,720
- 2024/25: ▲0.175 million
Location
Notes
- Passenger statistics from the Office of Rail and Road

Treherbert railway station serves the village of Treherbert in Rhondda Cynon Taf, Wales. It is the northern terminus of the Rhondda Line after Ynyswen, 23 miles 54 chains (38.1 km) from Cardiff Docks (Bute Town).

== History ==
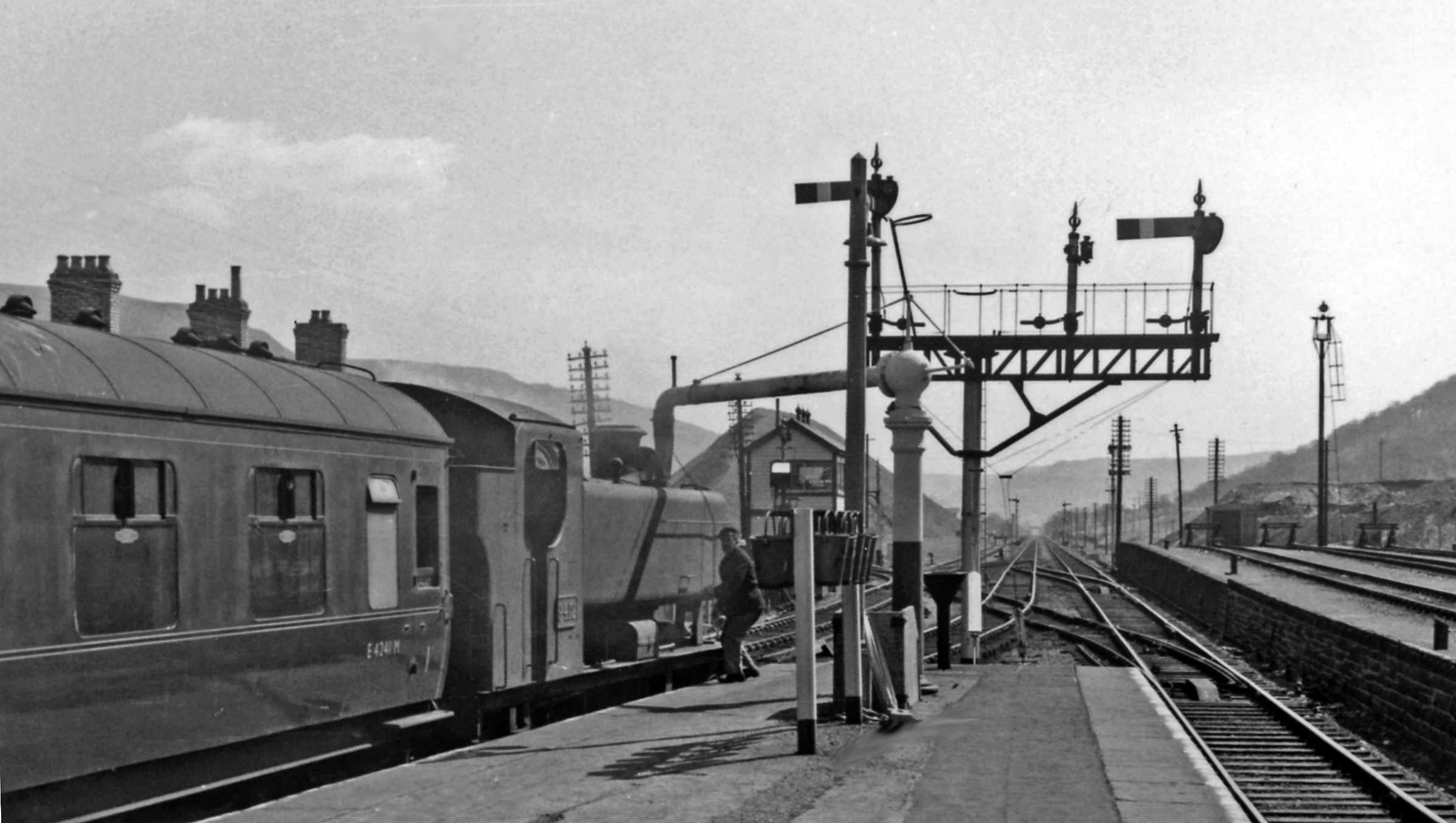
A train from Swansea towards Pontypridd in 1962

A station was first opened on this site by the Taff Vale Railway on 12 January 1863, and was the connecting point of the Rhondda and Swansea Bay Railway with the collieries of the Rhondda Fawr. The TVR had opened its Rhondda Fawr branch from Dinas (north of Pontypridd) in 1856 (to serve the Marquess of Bute's newly opened colliery) and began running passenger trains to the town seven years later.

Services over the R&SB via Aberavon to Swansea ended in December 1962, but the route through the Rhondda Tunnel and on to Maesteg and Bridgend via a connection at Cymmer Afan (over the Llynvi and Ogmore Railway) remained open until 1968, when the tunnel was closed due to roof distortion caused by mining subsidence. A replacement bus service then operated to Cymmer until the L&O route was formally closed to passenger traffic in June 1970.

The route towards Porth was singled from 1972. There are four carriage sidings for the Transport for Wales DMU fleet (several of which are stabled & serviced here overnight & at weekends).

== Facilities ==
The station has a help point, dot matrix departure screens and a seated waiting area. There are spaces for 20 bicycles.

== Passenger volume ==
Passenger Volume at Treherbert
| | 2002–03 | 2004–05 | 2005–06 | 2006–07 | 2007–08 | 2008–09 | 2009–10 | 2010–11 | 2011–12 | 2012–13 | 2013–14 | 2014–15 | 2015–16 | 2016–17 | 2017–18 | 2018–19 | 2019–20 | 2020–21 | 2021–22 | 2022–23 |
|---|---|---|---|---|---|---|---|---|---|---|---|---|---|---|---|---|---|---|---|---|
| Entries and exits | 220,325 | 456,396 | 463,286 | 490,890 | 501,012 | 503,456 | 498,236 | 526,862 | 512,582 | 529,676 | 541,720 | 521,860 | 510,248 | 508,624 | 485,964 | 457,656 | 395,518 | 27,518 | 95,984 | 121,196 |

The statistics cover twelve month periods that start in April.

== Services ==
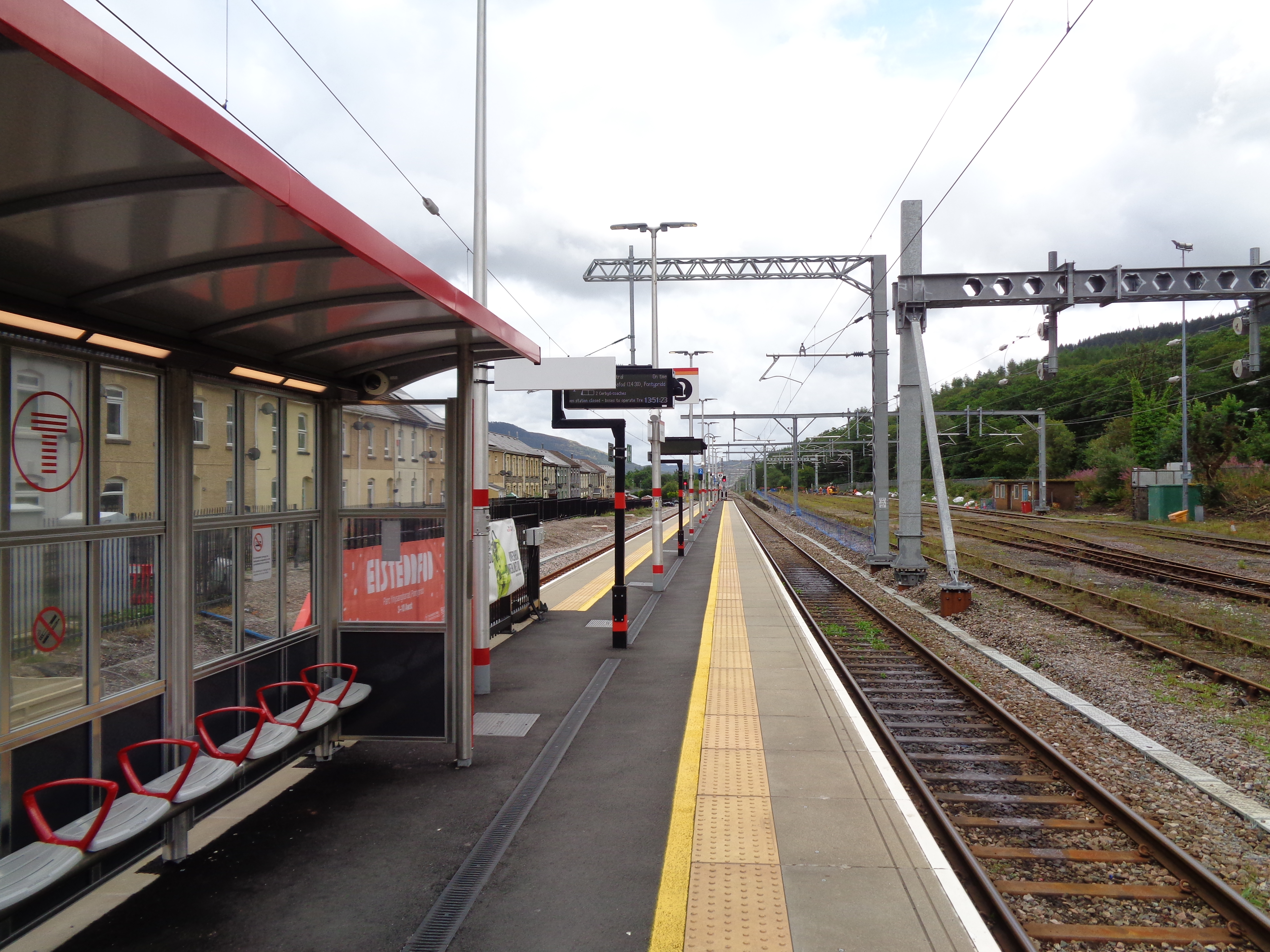
The platforms at Treherbert, looking South-East

The basic service pattern on the route provides a departure every 30 minutes during the day Mondays to Saturdays, dropping to hourly in the evening. Trains run to (and terminate at) Cardiff Central via Porth, Radyr and Cardiff Queen Street, serving all stations except Trefforest Estate en route. One early morning service continues to Penarth. On Sundays, the frequency is two-hourly, but services run through to Barry Island. On 20 July 2018, previous franchise operator Arriva Trains Wales announced a trial period of extra Sunday services on the Rhondda Line to Cardiff and Barry Island. This was in response to a survey by Leanne Wood and the success of extra Sunday services on the Merthyr Line and the Rhymney Line.

The service from this station was suspended from April 2023 to February 2024, due to major route upgrade work being carried out at multiple locations as part of the Valley Lines electrification scheme. A replacement bus service was in operation from here to Pontypridd, calling at all local stations. Rail services resumed on 26 February 2024, ahead of the introduction of new rolling stock later in the year. A second platform and passing loop was added at this time.

| Preceding station | National Rail | Following station |
|---|---|---|
| Ynyswen | Transport for Wales; Rhondda Line | Terminus |
| | Disused railways | |
| Ynyswen; Line and station open | Rhondda and Swansea Bay Railway | Blaenrhondda; Line and station closed |

== Bibliography ==
- Quick, Michael (2023). Railway Passenger Stations in Great Britain: A Chronology (PDF) (5th ed.). London: Railway and Canal Historical Society.
