= Pontypridd railway station =

Railway station in Rhondda Cynon Taf, Wales

Pontypridd
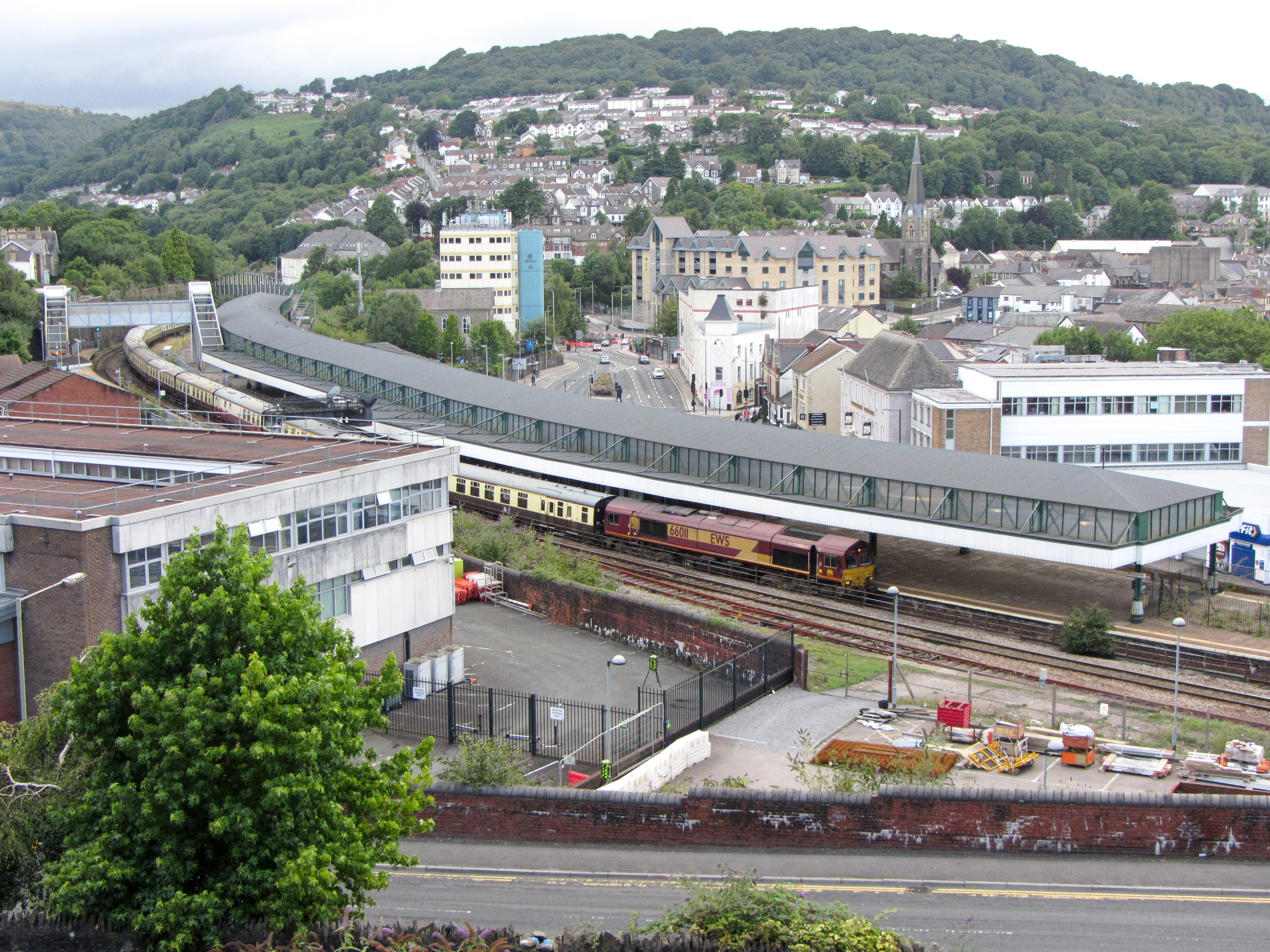
- A visiting railtour in the station (July 2017)

General information
- Location: Pontypridd, Rhondda Cynon Taf; Wales
- Coordinates: 51.5994°N 3.3419°W
- Grid reference: ST071898
- Managed by: Transport for Wales
- Platforms: 3

Other information
- Station code: PPD
- Classification: DfT category C2

History
- Original company: Taff Vale Railway
- Pre-grouping: Taff Vale Railway
- Post-grouping: Great Western Railway

Key dates
- 9 October 1840: Opened as Newbridge Junction
- March 1866: Renamed Pontypridd
- 1924: Renamed Pontypridd Central
- 10 July 1930: Renamed Pontypridd

Passengers
- 2020/21: ▼0.153 million
- Interchange: ▼6,808
- 2021/22: ▲0.409 million
- Interchange: ▲24,448
- 2022/23: ▲0.536 million
- Interchange: ▲35,985
- 2023/24: ▲0.596 million
- Interchange: ▲0.230 million
- 2024/25: ▲0.780 million
- Interchange: ▼32,696

Listed Building – Grade II
- Feature: Pontypridd Railway Station Main Platform including buildings and canopy
- Designated: 17 July 1990
- Reference no.: 13525
Location
Notes
- Passenger statistics from the Office of Rail and Road

Pontypridd railway station serves the town of Pontypridd in Rhondda Cynon Taf, Wales. It is located at the junction of the Merthyr line and the Rhondda line. It is between Treforest to the south, Trehafod to the northwest, and Abercynon to the northeast. It is sited 12 miles 75 chains (20.8 km) from Cardiff Docks (Bute Town).

Until the 1930s, Pontypridd had two other stations. One, just behind the present station, was known as Pontypridd Graig. It closed in 1930. The other, Pontypridd Tram Road, serving the former Pontypridd to Newport line, closed in 1922. It was located near where this line crossed the 'Broadway' in Treforest.

== History ==
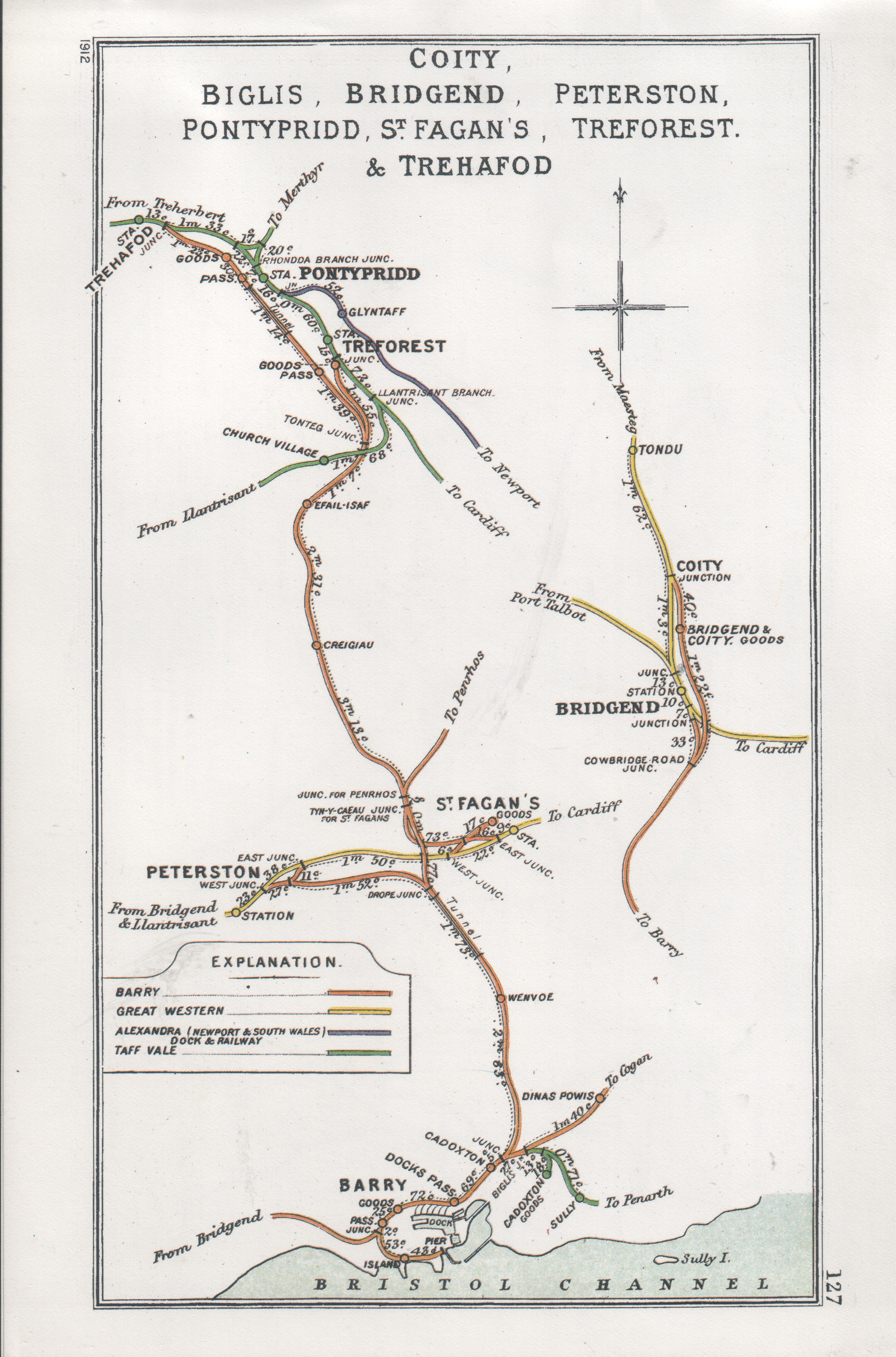
A 1912 Railway Clearing House Junction Diagram showing railways in the vicinity of Pontypridd (upper left). Taff Vale Railway in green; Barry Railway in orange.

The station was built by the Taff Vale Railway (TVR) and opened on 8 October 1840. It was known as Newbridge until March 1861, when it was renamed Newbridge Junction, and then renamed Pontypridd in 1902. Between 1924 and 1930 it was known as Pontypridd Central.

The Pontypridd, Caerphilly and Newport Railway (PC&NR) was opened for goods on 25 July 1884, providing a route to Newport Docks for Rhondda coal; the trains were worked by TVR locomotives. Passenger services, which used the TVR's station at Pontypridd, began on 28 December 1887, and were operated by the Alexandra (Newport and South Wales) Docks and Railway (ADR), which absorbed the PC&NR in 1897. Between April 1904 and July 1922, passenger services from Caerphilly terminating at Pontypridd used the ADR's own station at Pontypridd Tram Road.

The TVR and ADR amalgamated with the Great Western Railway on 1 January 1922, as did the Barry Railway, which also had a station in Pontypridd. To avoid confusion, the two stations were both renamed in 1924, the former TVR station becoming Pontypridd Central, with the ex-Barry Railway station becoming Pontypridd Graig. On 10 July 1930, Pontypridd Graig was closed, with its services being diverted to Pontypridd Central, which reverted to its former name of Pontypridd.

The former PC&NR route was closed to passengers from 17 September 1956. and completely in 1965, whilst the service to Llantrisant ended on 31 March 1952 and the former Barry Railway services to Cadoxton and to Cardiff Central via St Fagans on 10 September 1962.

With the Beeching Plan reducing passenger traffic (the line to Aberdare closing in March 1964), and falling coal production, track simplification was carried out by British Rail in 1974, resulting in the removal of all track from the eastern side of the island platform. Effectively, from 1974 onwards, the station functioned as a single-platform station (using old platform 1). However, with the subsequent re-opening of Aberdare and the growth of passenger traffic, British Rail added a new northbound platform in 1990–1991. This platform was built alongside the former freight lines west of the main island platform, and did not form part of the original station.

=== Accidents and incidents ===
On Monday 23 January 1911, a collision between a passenger train and a coal train on the Taff Vale Railway line at Hopkinstown, outside Pontypridd in Wales, resulted in the loss of eleven (twelve according to the official report) lives. The accident, also known as the Hopkinstown rail disaster or the Coke Ovens collision, occurred at 9:48 am, when the 09:10 passenger train from Treherbert to Cardiff, heading towards Pontypridd and carrying about 100 people, rounded the bend at Gyfeillion Lower signal box with a clear signal ahead. The train collided with a stationary coal train that was using the same line. The impact caused the underframe of the front carriage to rise up and pierce the carriage directly behind it.

=== Regeneration ===
As part of a £200m regeneration scheme to boost train capacity in Cardiff and the surrounding areas, Pontypridd received a third platform in December 2014.

Since December 2014, platforms have been re-numbered as follows:

- Platform 1 (pre-1974 platform 6): Bay platform for southbound services to Cardiff.
- Platform 2 (platform 1 pre-1974 and 1974–2014): Through southbound services to Cardiff.
- Platform 3 (freight line platform built in 1990-1 as platform 2): Through northbound services.

In October 2019, the station's underpass was repainted with help from Lionel Stanhope. The murals reflect vintage railway signs with 'Pontypridd' on one side and 'Graig' on the other. The project also brought improved lighting to the area.

== Passenger volume ==
Passenger Volume at Pontypridd
	2002–03	2004–05	2005–06	2006–07	2007–08	2008–09	2009–10	2010–11	2011–12	2012–13	2013–14	2014–15	2015–16	2016–17	2017–18	2018–19	2019–20	2020–21	2021–22	2022–23
Entries and exits	697,143	679,588	704,298	778,253	782,935	784,516	815,398	1,034,976	873,630	878,656	861,092	799,790	777,508	801,850	864,292	884,132	814,898	153,272	408,742	536,050
Interchanges	– (Note: No data available.)	80,213	128,591	137,366	143,779	113,617	116,453	111,837	97,143	105,319	106,046	100,768	90,501	70,803	57,963	53,586	48,280	6,808	24,448	35,985

The statistics cover twelve month periods that start in April.

== Services ==
During Monday-Saturday daytimes, there are usually six trains an hour from Cardiff Central, made up of a half-hourly service frequency on each of the three branches, i.e. to Treherbert, Merthyr Tydfil and Aberdare. This drops to hourly on each route in the evening. There are six trains an hour southbound to Cardiff Central via Cardiff Queen Street; two trains each hour terminate there, whilst the others continue to Barry Island (three per hour) or Bridgend via Barry (hourly). Some peak period & evening trains also serve Penarth, but the normal off-peak service pattern requires a change of train at Central or Grangetown for travellers heading there. In the evening there are three Cardiff-bound trains per hour.

A reduced service operates on Sundays, with two-hourly frequencies on all three northbound routes and three trains every two hours southbound to Cardiff and beyond.

The service from this station towards Porth and Treherbert was suspended from summer 2023, due to major route upgrade work being carried out at multiple locations as part of the Valley Lines electrification scheme. A replacement bus service was in operation calling at all local stations until rail services resumed on 26 February 2024.

Preceding station	National Rail	Following station
Treforest	Transport for Wales; Rhondda line	Trehafod
Treforest	Transport for Wales; Merthyr Line – Aberdare branch	Abercynon
Treforest	Transport for Wales; Merthyr Line – Merthyr Tydfil branch	Abercynon
	Disused railways	
Pontypridd Tram Road; Line and station closed	Alexandra Docks and Railway; Pontypridd, Caerphilly and Newport Railway	Trehafod; Line and station open

== Bibliography ==
- Quick, Michael (2023). Railway Passenger Stations in Great Britain: A Chronology (PDF) (5th ed.). London: Railway and Canal Historical Society.
