= Rhondda line =

Commuter railway line in South Wales

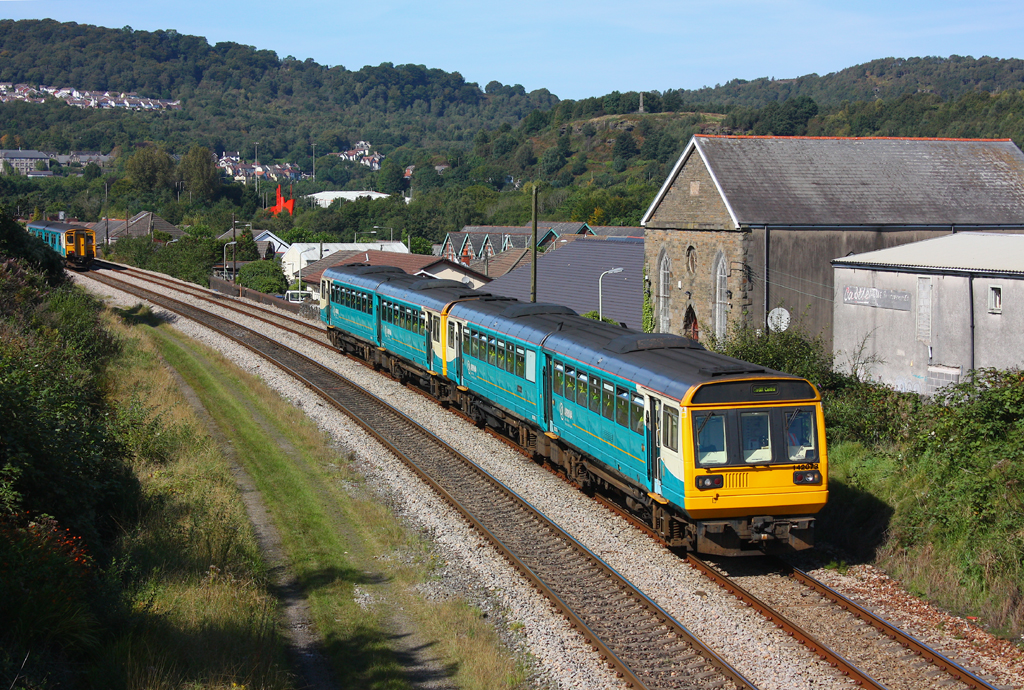
- A pair of Arriva Trains Wales Class 142s at Treforest, with a Class 150 on the opposite line in the background.

Overview
- Owner: Transport for Wales
- Locale: Cardiff; Rhondda Cynon Taff
- Termini: Cardiff 51.4760°N 3.1790°W; Treherbert 51.6722°N 3.5361°W

Service
- Type: Heavy Rail
- System: National Rail
- Operator(s): Transport for Wales Rail
- Rolling stock: Class 150 DMUs; Class 231; Class 756

Technical
- Line length: 23 miles 22 chains (37.5 km)
- Number of tracks: Single track – Treherbert to Porth with a passing loop at Ystrad; Double track – Porth to Cardiff
- Track gauge: 1,435 mm (4 ft 8 1/2 in) standard gauge
- Electrification: 25 kV 50 hz AC OLE (Discontinuous)
Route map
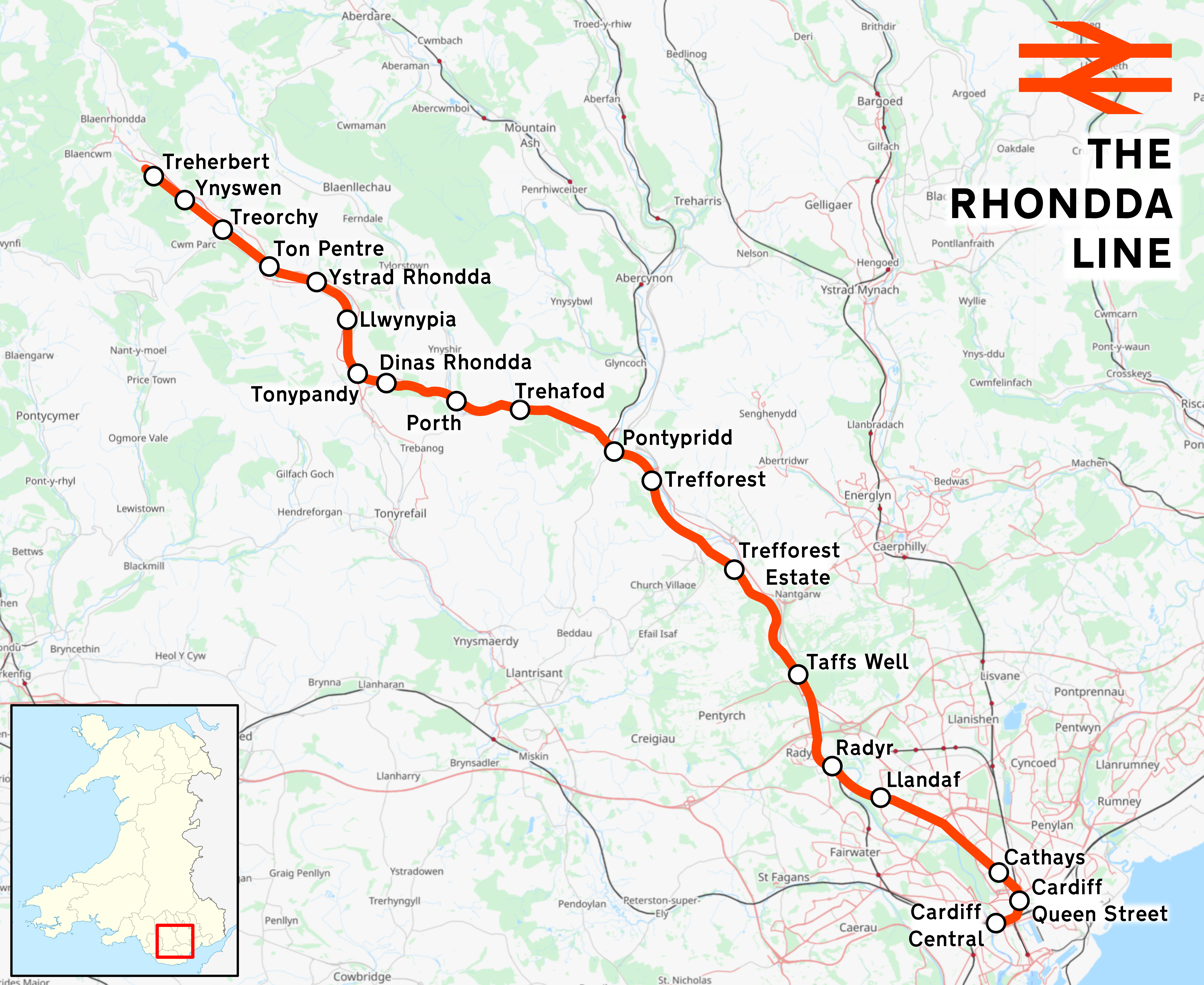
(Click to expand)

The Rhondda line, also known as the Treherbert line, is a commuter railway line in South Wales from Cardiff to Treherbert. The line follows the Merthyr line as far as Pontypridd, where it then diverges to continue along the Rhondda Valley.

== Background ==
The line is currently operated by Transport for Wales as part of the Valley Lines network. TfW replaced the previous franchise, Arriva Trains Wales in October 2018.

The first section of the line, as far as Pontypridd, is historically part of the Taff Vale Railway, from Cardiff to Merthyr Tydfil. At Pontypridd the Rhondda branch diverges and follows the course of the Rhondda Valley. It was single-tracked beyond Porth in the early 1980s, just prior to the commencement of the revival of the Valley Lines network. By 1986 a passing loop was constructed at Ystrad Rhondda station (itself newly built, with the original station of that name renamed Ton Pentre), to enable a half-hourly service to be introduced by British Rail. Another new station was opened at Ynyswen on the same day.

In March 2007 it was announced that platforms on the branch are to be lengthened to enable 6 car trains to run, together with leasing of an additional eight Class 150s for the whole network. This has been completed.

The line between Treherbert and Porth was closed between 21 and 24 January 2018 due to a landslip on the railway line. A replacement bus service ran whilst Network Rail cleared the line.

== Services ==
The line currently has a half-hourly service Monday to Saturday daytime with services decreasing to hourly in the evening. On Sunday the current service is two-hourly. On 20 July 2018, Arriva Trains Wales announced a summer trial of extra Sunday services to Cardiff and Barry Island. This was in response to a recent survey by Leanne Wood and the success of extra Sunday services on the nearby Merthyr Line and Rhymney Line.

== Electrification of the line ==
On 16 July 2012 plans to electrify the line were announced by the UK Government as part of a £9.4bn package of investment of the railways in England and Wales.

The announcement was made as an extension of the electrification of the South Wales Main Line from Cardiff to Swansea and the electrification of the south Wales Valley Lines at a total cost of £350 million. The investment will require new trains and should result in reduced journeys times and a cheaper to maintain network. Work was expected to start between 2014 and 2019, but was then pushed back to between 2019 and 2024.

However, as part of Welsh Government's South Wales Metro this line has been taken over, and is now being electrified in preparation for new Class 398 tram-train rolling stock.

The line closed at the end of April 2023 to update the outdated signaling system. The line reopened in late February 2024.

== See also ==
- List of railway stations in Cardiff
