= Butetown branch line =

Urban rail line in Cardiff, Wales

Cardiff Bay Line
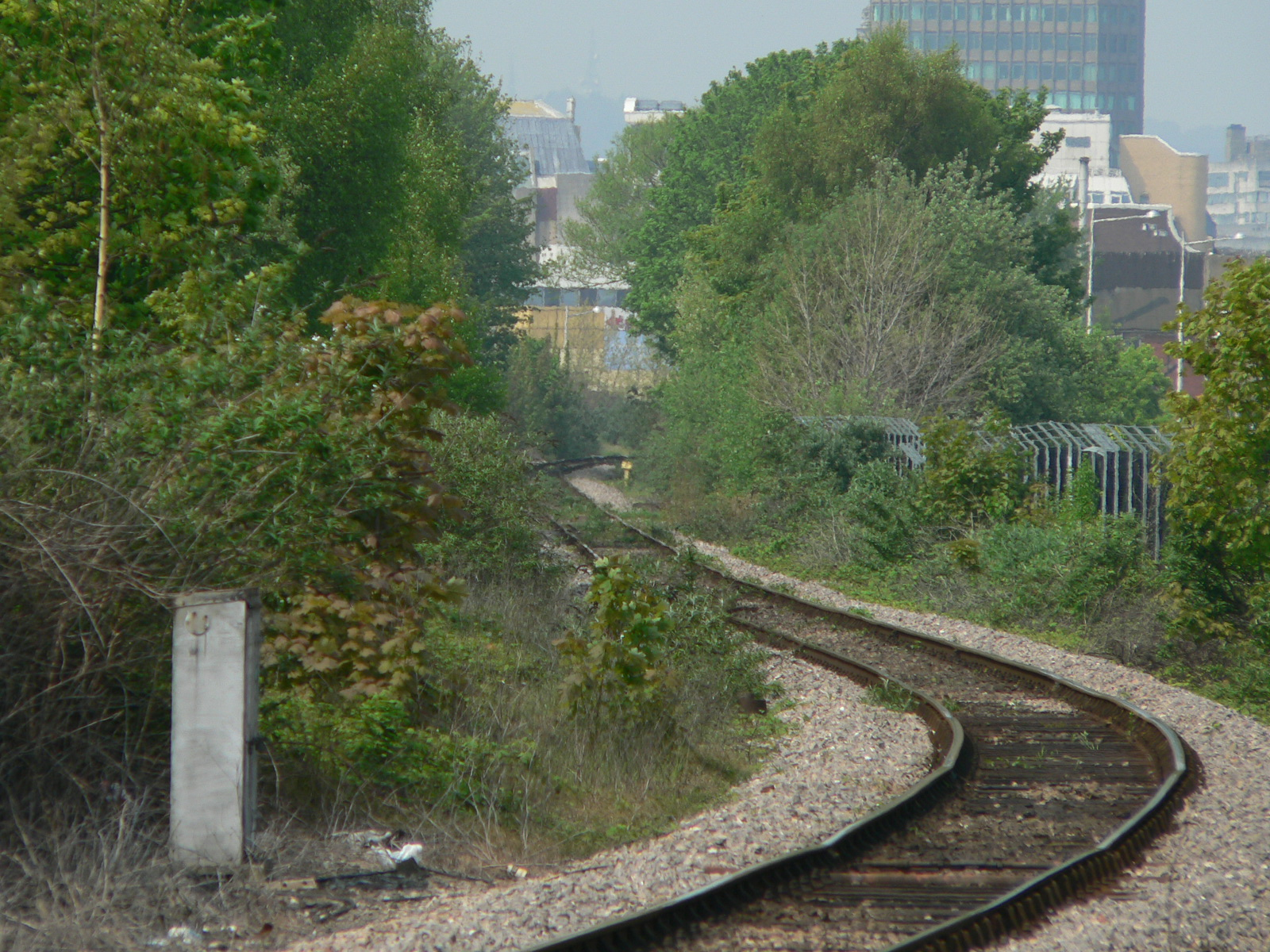

Overview
- Owner: Transport for Wales
- Locale: Cardiff
- Termini: Cardiff Bay; Cardiff Queen Street
- Stations: 2

Service
- Type: Urban rail
- System: National Rail
- Operator: Transport for Wales Rail
- Rolling stock: Class 150 DMUs; Class 398

History
- Opened: 1840

Technical
- Line length: 1 mile 6 chains (1.7 km)
- Num of tracks: Single track throughout (to be redoubled)
- Track gauge: 4 ft 8 1/2 in (1,435 mm) standard gauge
- Electrification: 25 kV 50 hz AC OLE (Discontinuous)
Route map
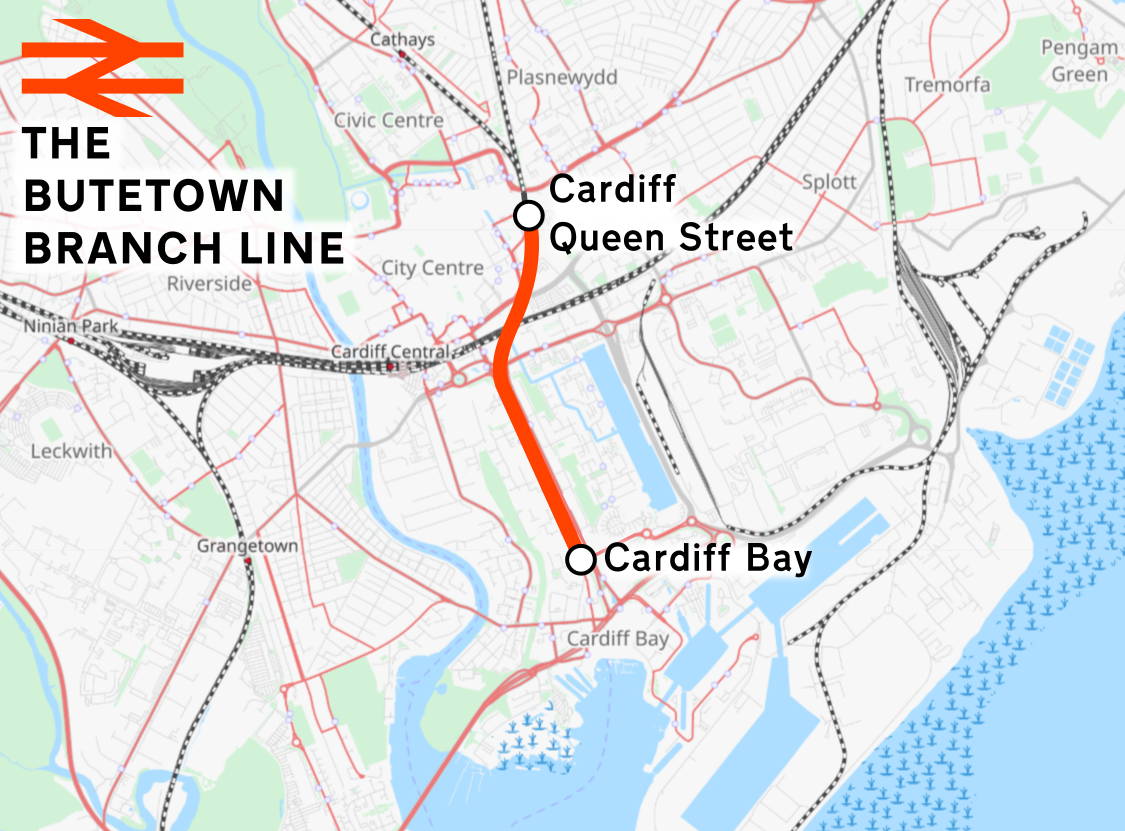
(Click to expand)

The Butetown branch line, also known as the Cardiff Bay Line, is a 1-mile-6-chain (1.7 km) urban rail line in Cardiff, Wales that starts from Cardiff Bay to Cardiff Queen Street. The service pattern currently consists of four trains per hour to Cardiff Queen Street, of which two continue via Radyr to Pontypridd. From 2005 until 2024, however, the service had been almost exclusively a shuttle between Cardiff Bay to Cardiff Queen Street. The normal journey time is four minutes.

== History ==
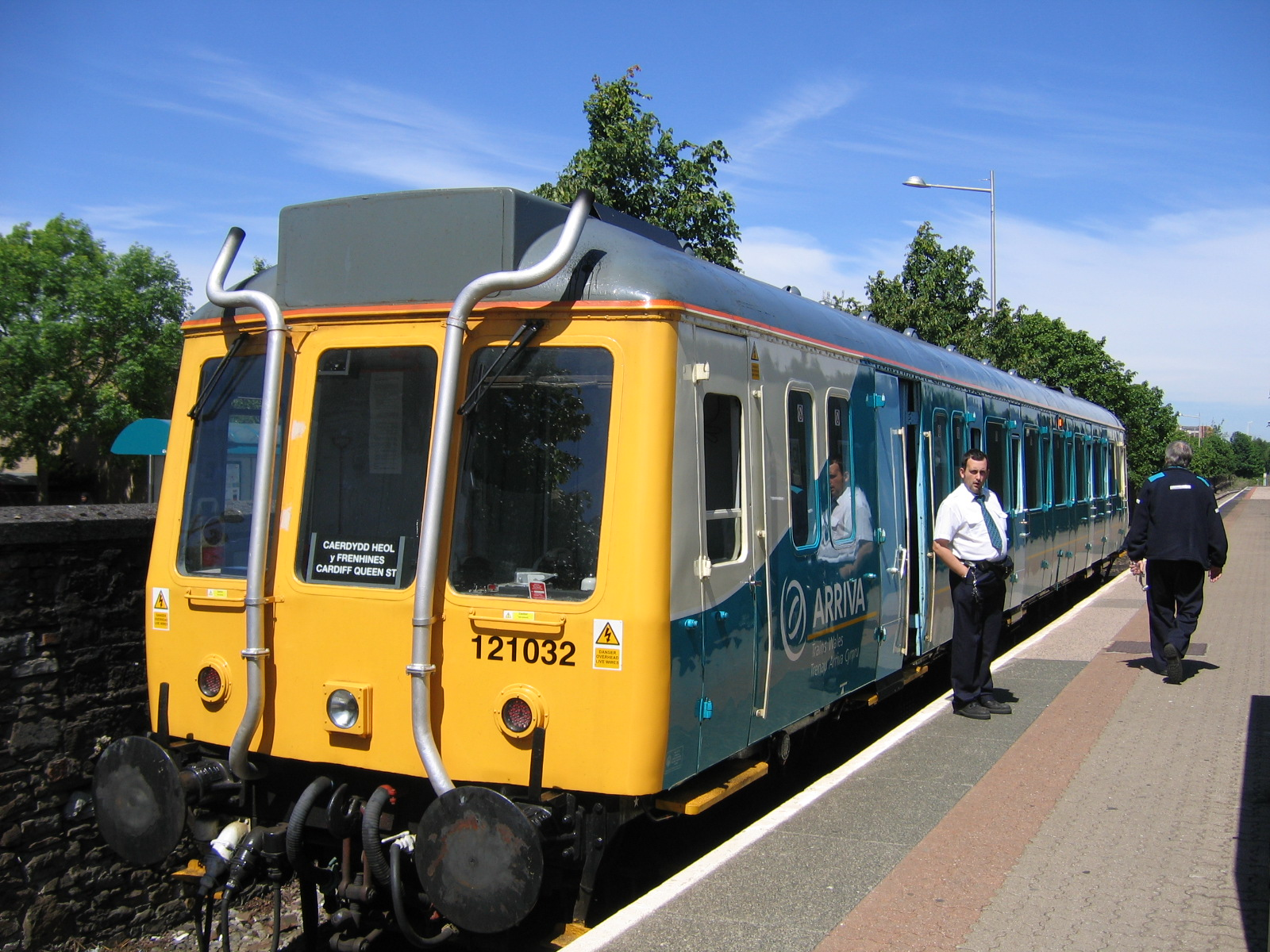
121032 at Cardiff Bay station

Originally a portion of the Taff Vale Railway's main line to Cardiff's Bute Docks, in 1922, it was absorbed, along with the neighbouring Rhymney Railway, into the enlarged Great Western Railway. With the decline of coal traffic and the closure of the Bute Docks, it now sees only passenger services, and connects the Cardiff Bay neighbourhood to the other Valley Lines.

At privatisation in 1995, services were operated by the Cardiff Railway Company, which traded as Valley Lines. This was subsumed by the new Wales & Borders franchise in 2001, which was subsequently awarded to Arriva UK Trains in December 2003 and operated as Arriva Trains Wales. In October 2018, KeolisAmey Wales took over the franchise from Arriva Trains Wales.

The December 2005 timetable introduced a further increase in services to 4 trains per hour 18 hours a day, and even a Sunday service for the first time (further improved in June 2006 to offer the same 4 trains per hour service from 11am to 4pm). In December 2005, Arriva employed a single car Class 153 to "shuttle" along the Butetown Line, upgrading from the 2 car Class 143 'Pacers' used for the service. Since then, the service frequency has been increased even more – there are now 5 trains per hour on the line every day of the week, which equates to one train every 12 minutes.

In July 2006 the service was due to be provided by a 1950s Class 121 "Bubble car" DMU. The unit finally entered service on 17 August 2006, only to be withdrawn for repairs two days later. The unit then re-entered service on 14 September 2006.

== Passenger volume ==
Below are the annual estimates of station usage from the year beginning April 2002 to the year beginning April 2020.

Station usage
Station name	2002–03	2004–05	2005–06	2006–07	2007–08	2008–09	2009–10	2010–11	2011–12	2012–13	2013–14	2014–15	2015–16	2016–17	2017–18	2018–19	2019–20	2020–21	2021–22	2022–23	2023–24	2024–25
Cardiff Queen Street	1,841,260	2,072,551	2,126,479	2,231,784	2,486,005	2,559,748	2,437,638	2,411,438	2,488,920	2,495,238	2,462,700	2,523,314	2,643,568	2,850,984	2,912,364	2,919,214	2,694,084	472,914	1,366,108	1,713,720		
Cardiff Bay	177,911	245,910	274,133	404,049	518,572	594,520	685,608	753,148	793,382	869,126	1,019,348	1,143,746	1,190,780	1,242,214	1,302,676	1,531,444	1,462,962	88,028	314,932	510,964		
The annual passenger usage is based on sales of tickets in stated financial years from Office of Rail and Road estimates of station usage. The statistics are for passengers arriving and departing from each station and cover twelve-month periods that start in April. Methodology may vary year on year. Usage since the period 2019–20 have been affected by the COVID-19 pandemic, especially the period 2020–23.

== Modernisation ==
On 16 July 2012, plans to electrify the line were announced by the government, as part of a £9.4bn package of investment of the railways in England and Wales. The announcement was made as an extension of the electrification of the South Wales Main Line from Cardiff to Swansea and the electrification of the south Wales Valley Lines at a total cost of £350 million. It was proposed to start between 2014 and 2019.

In June 2018 it was announced by the then future operator KeolisAmey Wales that the line would be re-integrated into Valley Lines services, with 6 trains per hour to operate from Merthyr Tydfil, Aberdare and Treherbert. A new station would be constructed at Loudoun Square and a short extension would be built taking the line closer to Cardiff Bay, opening in December 2023. The current Cardiff Bay station would close at the same time, which didn't happen in the end. Stadler Citylink tram-trains would replace the Class 153s. These would switch to battery power on the branch, negating the need for electrification.

In August 2022 it was announced that the existing Cardiff Bay station would now be retained (with no extension built) and it will get a second platform as well as a new signage and customer information screens. The station at Loudoun Square will now be located further north than previously planned (near Maria Street) and would also comprise two platforms, opening in spring 2024. Loudoun Square was also later renamed Butetown. Preliminary construction on both Butetown and the redevelopment of Cardiff Bay began in January 2023 with the main works to begin later in summer 2023.

In September 2024 it was announced that Cardiff Central would be connected to the line through Cardiff Crossrail, with work anticipated to begin in Autumn 2025. Cardiff Crossrail is planned to run at street level from two new platforms at Cardiff Central through Callaghan Square, connecting to the branch line north of Butetown station. Cardiff Bay station would gain a third platform. There are also proposals to extend the line south of Cardiff Bay towards Pierhead Street.

== See also ==
- List of railway stations in Cardiff
- Cardiff Riverside Branch
