= Eastbrook railway station =

Railway station in the Vale of Glamorgan, Wales

Eastbrook
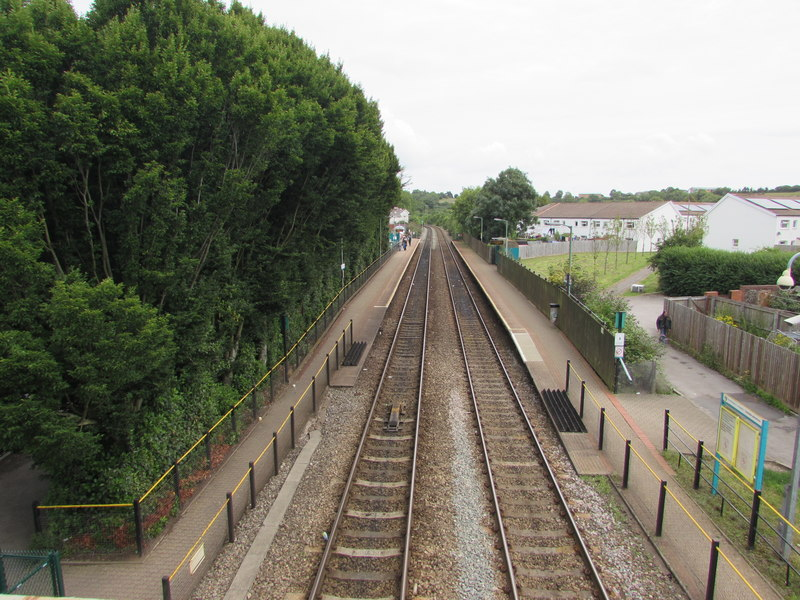

General information
- Location: Dinas Powys, Vale of Glamorgan; Wales
- Coordinates: 51°26′16″N 3°12′22″W
- Grid reference: ST162716
- Managed by: Transport for Wales
- Platforms: 2

Other information
- Station code: EBK
- Classification: DfT category F2

Key dates
- 24 November 1986: Opened

Passengers
- 2020/21: ▼25,534
- 2021/22: ▲79,628
- 2022/23: ▲0.114 million
- 2023/24: ▲0.132 million
- 2024/25: ▲0.142 million
Location
Notes
- Passenger statistics from the Office of Rail and Road

Eastbrook railway station is a railway station serving the Eastbrook area of Dinas Powys, a village near Cardiff, South Wales. It is located on Network Rail's Barry Branch 3 1/2 miles (5.6 km) south of Cardiff Central towards Barry Island and Bridgend (via Barry and Rhoose).

Passenger services are operated by Transport for Wales as part of the Valley Lines network. It is one of the more recent additions to the route, being opened by British Rail in 1986.

== Services ==
The typical Monday-Saturday off-peak service from Eastbrook is:

- 2 tph which terminate at Rhymney, calling at Cogan, Grangetown, Cardiff Central, Cardiff Queen Street, Heath High Level, Llanishen, Lisvane and Thornhill, Caerphilly, Aber, Llanbradach, Ystrad Mynach, Hengoed, Pengam, Bargoed, Brithdir (1tph), Tir-Phil (1tph) and Pontlottyn (1tph). This journey takes 68 minutes if started its journey from Barry Island or 72 minutes if started its journey from Bridgend.
- 2 tph which terminate at Bargoed, calling at Cogan, Grangetown, Cardiff Central, Cardiff Queen Street, Heath High Level, Llanishen, Lisvane and Thornhill, Caerphilly, Aber, Energlyn & Churchill Park, Llanbradach, Ystrad Mynach, Hengoed, Pengam and Gilfach Fargoed (1tph).This journey takes 58 minutes.
- 3 tph which terminate at Barry Island, calling at Dinas Powys, Cadoxton, Barry Docks and Barry. This journey takes 22 minutes.
- 1 tph which terminates at Bridgend, calling at Dinas Powys, Cadoxton, Barry Docks, Barry, Rhoose for Cardiff International Airport and Llantwit Major. This journey takes 49 minutes.

These services combine to give 4 tph to Cardiff Central, Cardiff Queen Street and stations to Bargoed, 2tph continues to Rhymney. In the evening, trains run every 30 minutes each way and on Sundays there are 2 tph to Barry Island, one every 2 hours to Bridgend and either two or three per hour to Cardiff.

Preceding station	National Rail	Following station
Cogan	Transport for Wales Rail; Vale of Glamorgan Line	Dinas Powys
