= Grangetown railway station =

Railway station in Cardiff, Wales

Grangetown
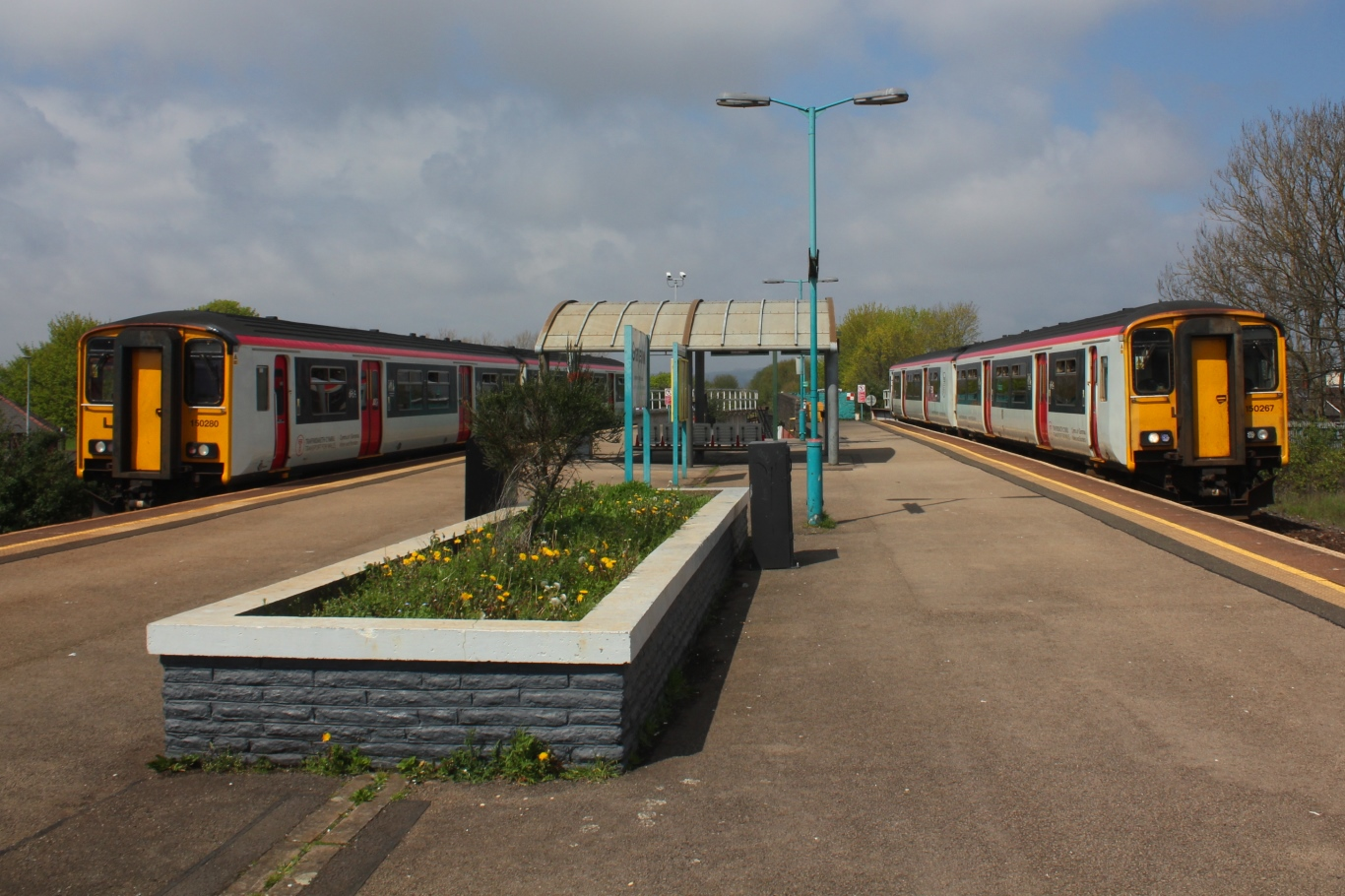

General information
- Location: Grangetown, Cardiff; Wales
- Coordinates: 51°28′03″N 3°11′23″W
- Grid reference: ST174749
- Managed by: Transport for Wales
- Platforms: 2

Other information
- Station code: GTN
- Classification: DfT category F2

Key dates
- 29 May 1882: Opened
- 1904: Rebuilt

Passengers
- 2020/21: ▼68,802
- Interchange: ▼1,111
- 2021/22: ▲0.172 million
- Interchange: ▲3,406
- 2022/23: ▲0.202 million
- Interchange: ▲5,057
- 2023/24: ▲0.252 million
- Interchange: ▲14,630
- 2024/25: ▲0.259 million
- Interchange: ▼8,399
Location
Notes
- Passenger statistics from the Office of Rail and Road

Grangetown railway station is a railway station serving the Grangetown district of Cardiff, Wales. It is located on the Vale of Glamorgan Line 1 mile (1.5 km) south west of Cardiff Central towards Bridgend via Barry, Penarth and Barry Island.

Passenger services are operated by Transport for Wales as part of the Valley Lines network. The station is reached by steps, so access is not suitable for wheelchair users and would be difficult for people with prams/pushchairs.

== History ==
Grangetown railway station

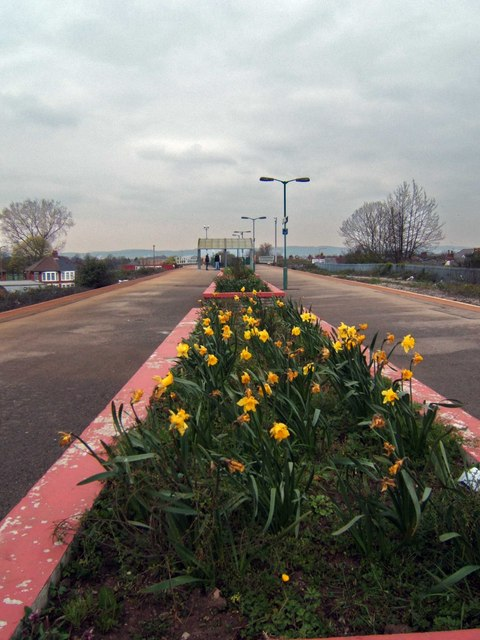
Platforms 1 and 2 (2008)

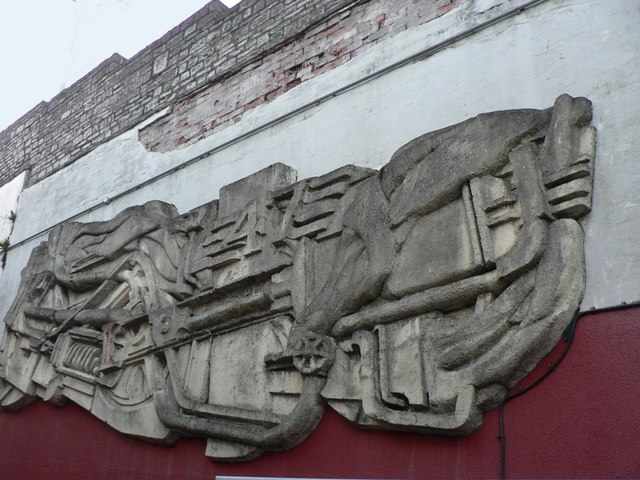
Wall art from the street level up to the platforms (2009)

This station was first opened by the Taff Vale Railway in 1882 and rebuilt with an island platform in 1904, though the railway serving it (what is now the City Line) was originally opened in 1859 to serve the nearby Penarth harbour and dock (even though the dock itself was not commissioned until 1865). The extension onwards to Cogan & Penarth was completed in 1878 and the Barry Railway route to Barry a decade later.

The original 1859 freight-only docks branch (latterly known as the Ferry Road branch) left the later route towards Cogan Junction at the station – latterly accessed by means of a ground frame and connected to the 'down' line towards Barry, it remained in regular use until the mid-1980s to serve several oil depots and a scrapyard but has since been closed & lifted.

== Services ==
Grangetown has a very frequent service. The service pattern is as follows:

Mondays to Saturdays:

- 8tph to Cardiff Central and Queen Street, of which:
  - 2tph continue to Coryton
  - 2tph continue to Caerphilly
  - 4tph continue to Bargoed, of which 2tph continues to Rhymney
- 4tph to Penarth
- 3tph to Barry Island
- 1tph to Bridgend

The frequency drops somewhat in the evening, with half hourly services to Rhymney and the final Rhymney Line service from Barry Island terminates at Ystrad Mynach.

On Sundays, the service pattern decreases to:

- 1tp2h to Cardiff Central
  - 1tp continues to Cardiff Queen Street
  - 1tp continues to Caerphilly
  - 1tp continues to Rhymney
- 2tph to Barry Island
- 1tph to Penarth
- 1tp2h to Bridgend

Preceding station	National Rail	Following station
Cardiff Central	Transport for Wales; Vale Line	Dingle Road
Cardiff Central	Transport for Wales; Vale Line	Cogan

== See also ==
- List of railway stations in Cardiff
- Rail transport in Cardiff
