= Docks station =

Docks station may refer to:

- Barry Docks railway station, in South Wales
- Falmouth Docks railway station, in Cornwall, England
- Grimsby Docks railway station, in Lincolnshire, England
