= Barry Dock Interchange =

Transport Interchange in Wales

Barry Dock Transport Interchange Welsh: Gyfnewidfa Trafnidiaeth y Dociau'r Barri
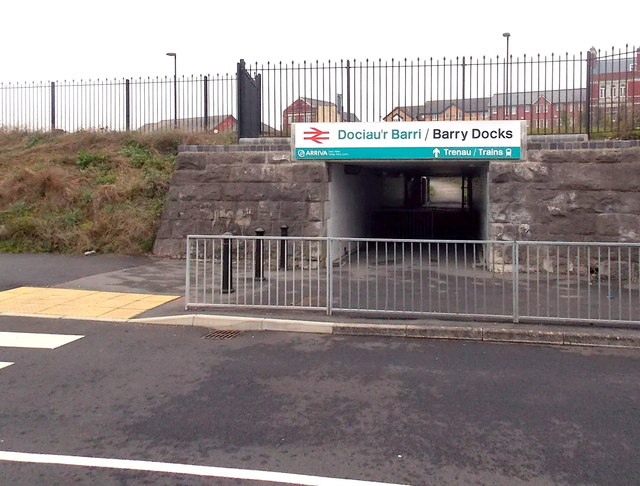
- Entrance to Barry Docks station

General information
- Location: Ffordd Y Mileniwm, Barry, Vale of Glamorgan CF63 4RT; Vale of Glamorgan; Wales
- Coordinates: 51.4015°N 3.2622°W
- System: Bus station
- Owner: Vale of Glamorgan Council
- Operator: Transport for Wales
- Bus routes: 2
- Bus stands: 4
- Bus operators: Adventure Travel; Transport for Wales (rail replacement only)
- Connections: B3, Barry Circular Route operated by Adventure Travel; 88 to Penarth operated by Adventure Travel

Construction
- Structure type: At-grade
- Parking: Yes - Park and Ride available for Barry Dock station and the bus interchange
- Cycle facilities: Multiple bicycle racks that are sheltered; Major bike lane that runs in and out of the interchange along Ffordd y Mileniwm
- Accessible: Yes

Other information
- Status: Unstaffed

History
- Opened: 30 August 2023
Location

The Barry Dock Transport Interchange (also known as Barry Dock Interchange or Barry Transport Interchange) is located in Barry, Vale of Glamorgan, Wales. It is next to Barry Docks railway station in the car park of Barry Dock Offices and connects the railway station with local bus services in and around the Vale of Glamorgan.

The Transport Interchange opened in 2023 to a negative reaction from locals as no buses were set to serve the interchange.

== Development ==
On 11 March 2021, plans for a transport interchange connecting to Barry Docks railway station, as part of the Cardiff Capital Region project, with funding from the Welsh Government was announced. The plan was to create a bus interchange and park and ride facility at Barry Docks station to act as a gateway to the town centre and waterfront.

On 15 June 2021, the Vale of Glamorgan council published plans of what the proposed transport interchange might look like and what it might include.

On 2 August 2022, the Vale of Glamorgan Council approved the plans for the transport interchange.

== Construction ==
On 9 January 2023, phase one of the development of the transport interchange begins construction. Phase one involves the construction of the bus and taxi interchange, with it set to be completed by May of that year.

== Controversies ==
When the Transport interchange first opened, there was no bus services running from or two the interchange. This faced major backlash by locals who described the interchange as a joke and a waste of money.. The first bus route to serve the interchange was the B3, on 8 January 2024, five months after originally 'opening'.

== Services ==
The first bus route to serve the interchange was the B3, on 8 January 2024, which began operating five months after the interchange originally opened.

On 2 April 2024, the Vale of Glamorgan council announced the reintroduction of the 88 route from Barry, Vale of Glamorgan to Penarth, run by Adventure Travel. It was announced that the route, when it comes back into service, would be extended to serve the bus interchange.
