= Cardiff Canton TMD =

Railway maintenance depot in Cardiff, Wales

Cardiff Canton
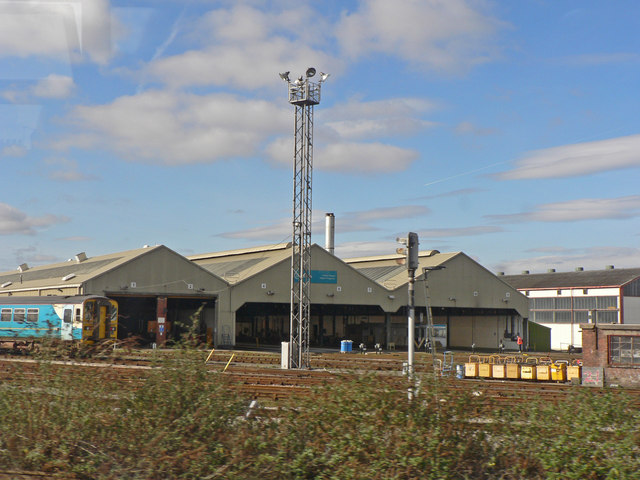
- The depot in 2009
- Interactive map of Cardiff Canton

Location
- Location: Cardiff, Wales
- Coordinates: 51.4761°N 3.1940°W
- OS grid: ST170759

Characteristics
- Operator: Transport for Wales Rail
- Depot code: CF; CV (DMU)
- Type: Diesel, DMU, DEMU, DMU
- Roads: 6 (as built)

History
- Opened: 1882
- Original: GWR
- Pre-grouping: GWR
- Post-grouping: GWR
- BR region: Western Region
- Former depot code: CTN; 86C (1948-1961); 88A (1961-1963); 86A (1963-1973)

Cardiff Canton TMD is a diesel locomotive traction maintenance depot in Cardiff, Wales. Its depot code is CF. It is operated by Transport for Wales. The depot is used by Transport for Wales fleet, GWR Class 158s and some Cross Country Class 170s.

In steam days the depot was called Cardiff Canton and its shed code was 86C. It was built in 1882 as the main maintenance base for the South Wales Railway and the major Welsh engineering base for the Great Western Railway (GWR). After nationalisation in 1948 it was a heavy overhaul base for British Railways.

After privatisation in the mid-1990s the depot became a joint Arriva Trains Wales and English Welsh & Scottish facility. The EWS depot closed as a maintenance centre from 10 December 2005.

== History ==
=== Steam ===
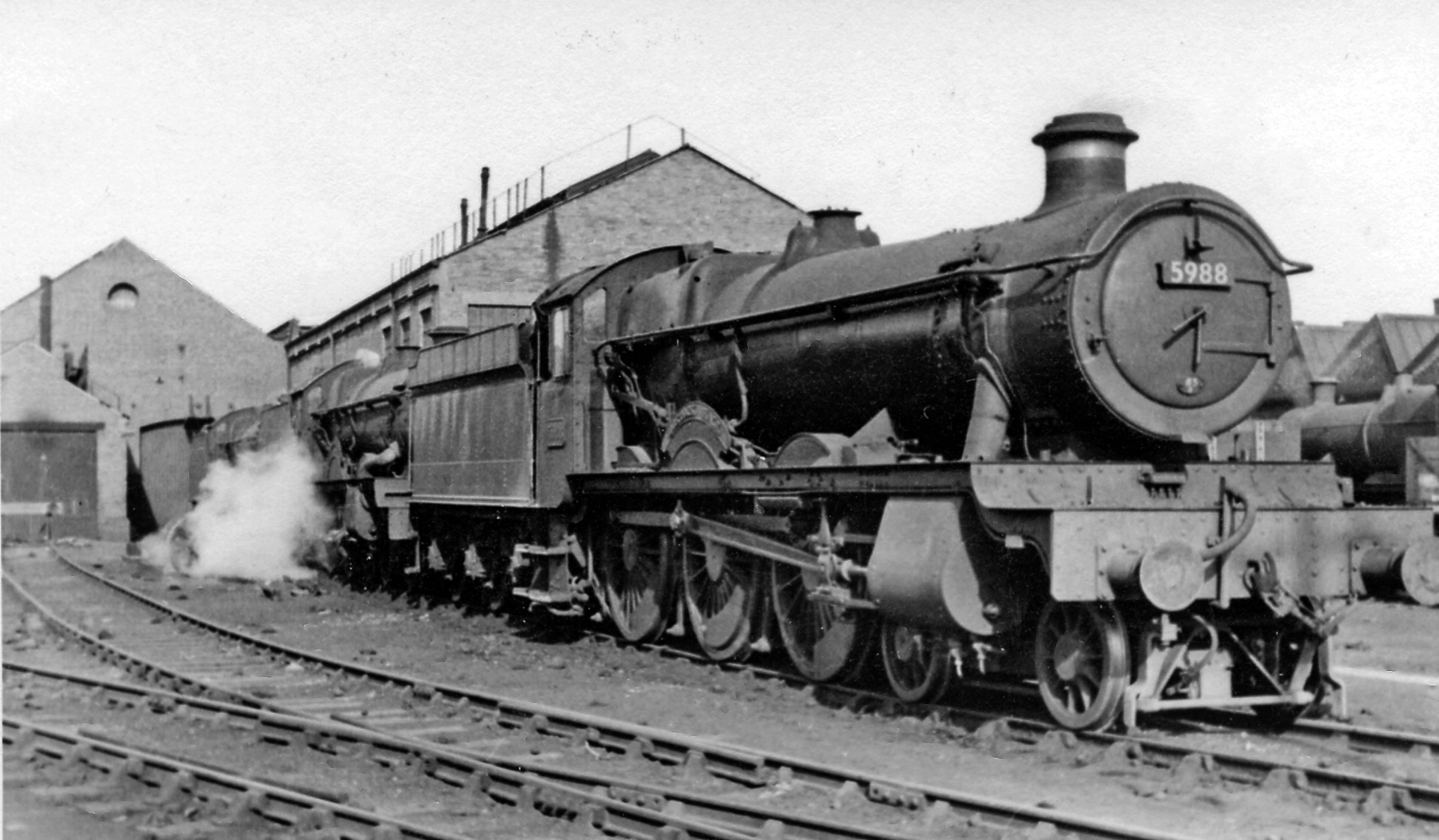
Former GWR steam locomotives at Canton in 1951

Cardiff Canton was opened in June 1882 as a six road, 240-foot (73 m)-long shed, built to replace Long Dyke, 1.5 miles (2.4 km) east of Cardiff General station. The GWR enlarged the depot in 1897 with a 55 ft (17 m)-diameter turntable installed in a square locomotive shed with 28 roads radiating off the turntable. In 1925 the GWR added a locomotive repair and lifting shed and a new coaling stage. In 1931 the original 55 ft (17 m)-turntable was removed and replaced by a larger 65 ft (20 m)-diameter one at the west end of the yard. At this time, around the peak of GWR operation, the depot had allocated 50 main line passenger locomotives, 40 heavy goods, mineral locomotives and 30 smaller local passenger/goods and shunting locomotives. Steam traction at the depot ceased on 8 September 1962.

=== Diesel ===
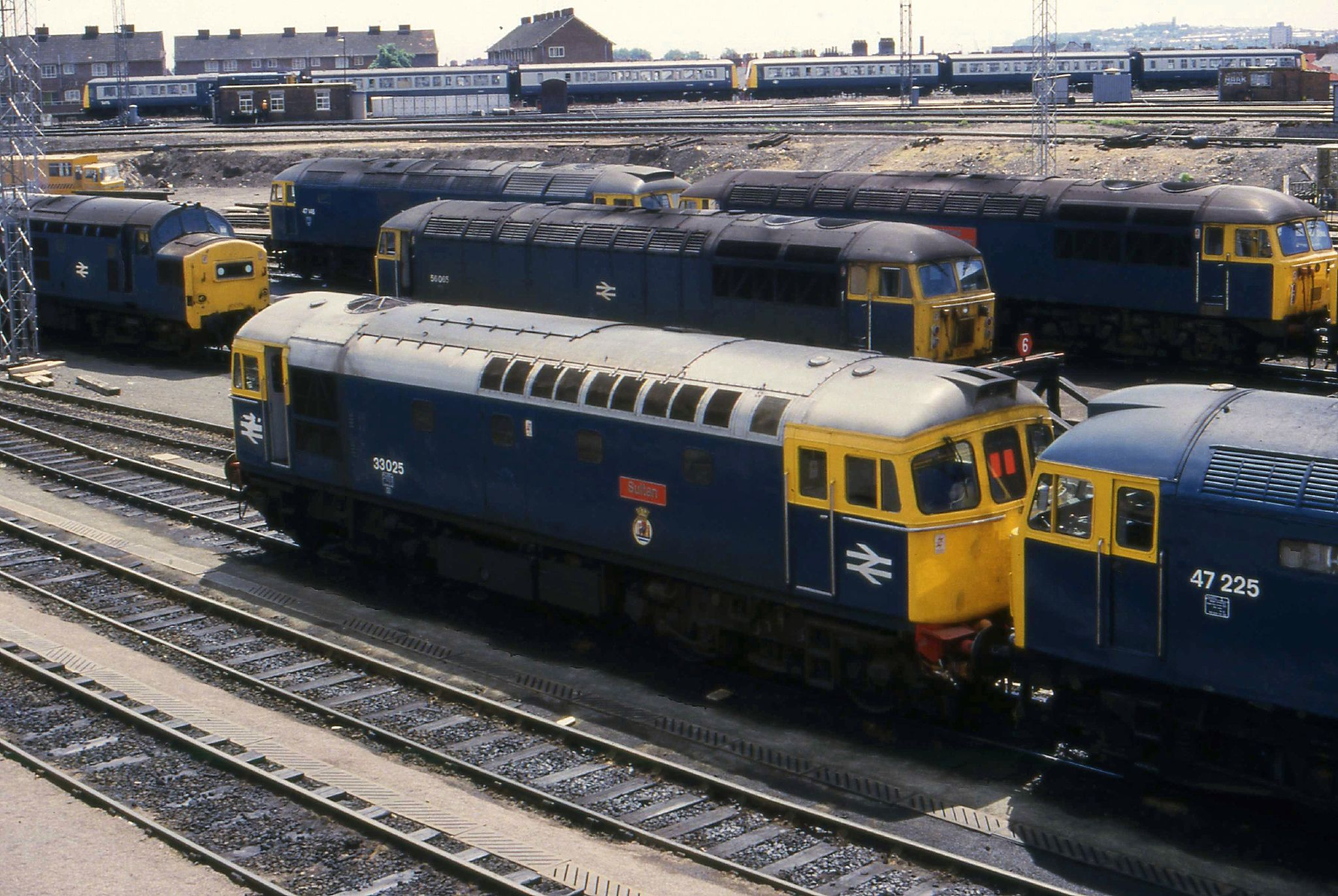
BR diesel locomotives at Canton in the 1980s

In the winter of 1962–63, Kyle Stewart contracted to build for British Railways a new £1,324,000 complex on a 30-acre (12 ha) site. Lord Brecon, Minister of State for Welsh Affairs, opened the new depot on 18 September 1964.

The original allocation was 360 locomotives for major maintenance, 197 for normal maintenance and 62 shunting locomotives. Employed were 40 managerial and supervisory staff, 31 clerical staff, 382 maintenance staff and 55 unskilled staff.

In 1987, the depot's allocation of rolling stock included Classes 08, 37, 47, 56 and DMUs, although Classes 33 and 50 could also usually be seen at the depot.

== Allocation ==
- Class 08
- Class 67
  - British Rail Mark 4
- Class 150
- Class 153
- Class 158
- Class 170
- Class 197
- Class 231
- Class 756
