= Dinas Powys railway station =

Railway station in the Vale of Glamorgan, Wales

Dinas Powys
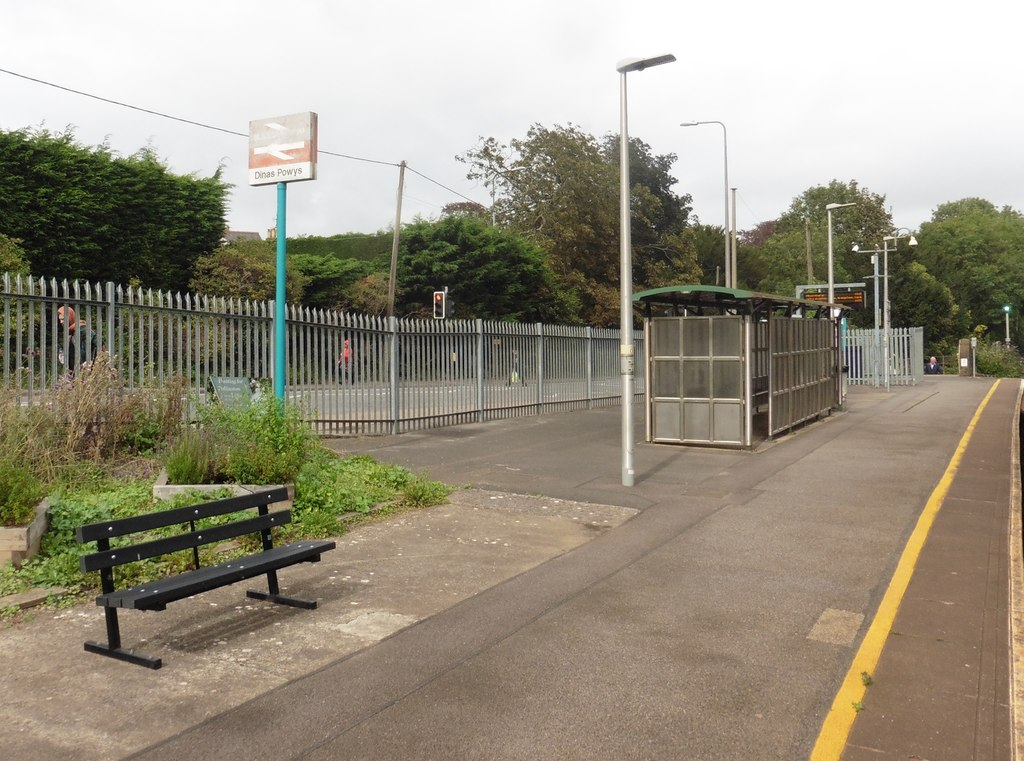

General information
- Location: Dinas Powys, Vale of Glamorgan, Wales
- Coordinates: 51°25′53″N 3°13′08″W
- Grid reference: ST153709
- Managed by: Transport for Wales
- Platforms: 2

Other information
- Station code: DNS
- Classification: DfT category F2

History
- Opened: 20 December 1888

Passengers
- 2020/21: ▼12,656
- 2021/22: ▲52,590
- 2022/23: ▲71,520
- 2023/24: ▲86,294
- 2024/25: ▲94,876
Location
Notes
- Passenger statistics from the Office of Rail and Road

Dinas Powys is one of two railway stations that serve the village of Dinas Powys, in the Vale of Glamorgan, South Wales; the other is Eastbrook. It lies on the Barry branch of the Valley Lines network, 4 1/2 miles (7 km) south of Cardiff Central. Transport for Wales manages the station and operates all services.

== Facilities ==
There are few facilities offered, including ticket machines, level access to platforms, a help point and sheltered seating areas.

== Services ==
Transport for Wales operates the following general off-peak service pattern, in trains per hour (tph):

- 3 tph to Barry Island
- 1 tph to Bridgend
- 2 tph to Bargoed
- 2 tph to Rhymney.

Preceding station	National Rail	Following station
Eastbrook	Transport for Wales; Vale of Glamorgan Line	Cadoxton
