= Barry railway station =

Railway station in the Vale of Glamorgan, Wales

Barry Welsh: Y Barri

General information
- Location: Barry, Vale of Glamorgan; Wales
- Coordinates: 51°23′48″N 3°17′05″W
- Grid reference: ST107672
- Managed by: Transport for Wales
- Platforms: 3

Other information
- Station code: BRY
- Classification: DfT category E

History
- Opened: 8 February 1889

Passengers
- 2020/21: ▼0.110 million
- Interchange: ▼1,083
- 2021/22: ▲0.349 million
- Interchange: ▲3,459
- 2022/23: ▲0.452 million
- Interchange: ▼3,450
- 2023/24: ▲0.529 million
- Interchange: ▼2,855
- 2024/25: ▲0.600 million
- Interchange: ▲4,288
Location
Notes
- Passenger statistics from the Office of Rail and Road

Barry railway station (Welsh: Y Barri) is one of three stations serving the town of Barry, Vale of Glamorgan in South Wales. This one, Barry Town, is preceded by Barry Docks and Cadoxton stations on the Barry Branch which runs from Cardiff Central to a fourth station at Barry Island, the terminus. Barry is also the junction at the start of the Vale of Glamorgan Line which serves Rhoose and Llantwit Major and terminates at Bridgend.

Passenger services are operated by Transport For Wales as part of the Valley Lines network.

== History ==
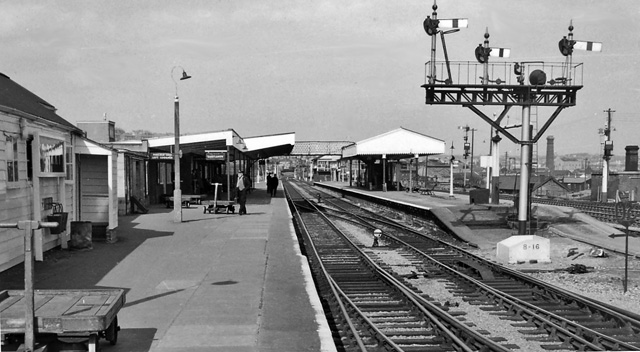
The station in 1962

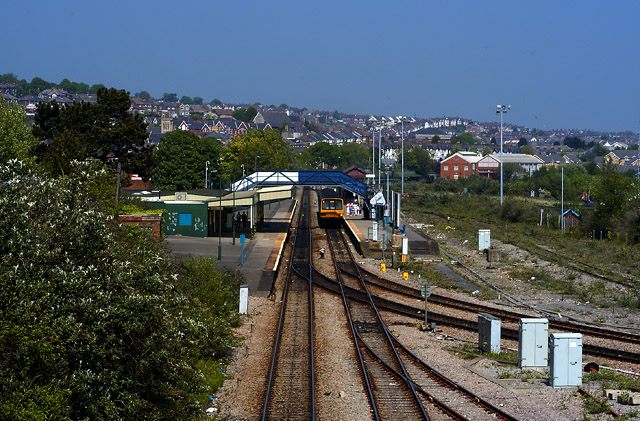
The station in July 2007

Although Barry station was the terminus of the original Barry Railway, it was not among the first stations to open. The first passenger services ran between Cogan and Barry Docks starting on 20 December 1888 along the line known as the Cogan branch; the main line ran from Cadoxton South Junction to Trehafod in the Rhondda. The extension of services to Barry did not happen until 8 February 1889. It remained a terminus for Cardiff services until the Barry Railway became a constituent member of the Great Western Railway in 1922. However, the line was extended to Barry Island on 3 August 1896 and a good proportion of the passenger trains terminated there. Barry was also the terminus of the Vale of Glamorgan Railway which opened on 1 December 1897 though was operated by the Barry Railway.

Trains ran from Bridgend where the Barry Railway had its own platform and passengers wishing to travel to Cardiff had to change trains at Barry. The Vale of Glamorgan branch was closed to passengers on 15 June 1964 but after much demand, was successfully re-opened on 10 June 2005 with Rhoose station also providing a bus link to Cardiff International Airport. Both Rhoose and Llantwit Major station platforms were re-established in a different form with staggered platforms at Rhoose and opposite each other at Llantwit Major and with a pedestrian footbridge linking them.

== Facilities ==
The station has a staffed ticket office on platform 1, which is open six days per week from early morning until mid-afternoon. A ticket machine is available for use outside these times and for collecting pre-paid tickets. A waiting room is available in the main building when the station is staffed, with a shelter on the island platform. Other amenities include a cafe, payphone and toilets. Train running information is offered via CIS displays, automated announcements, a help point on platform 1 and timetable posters.

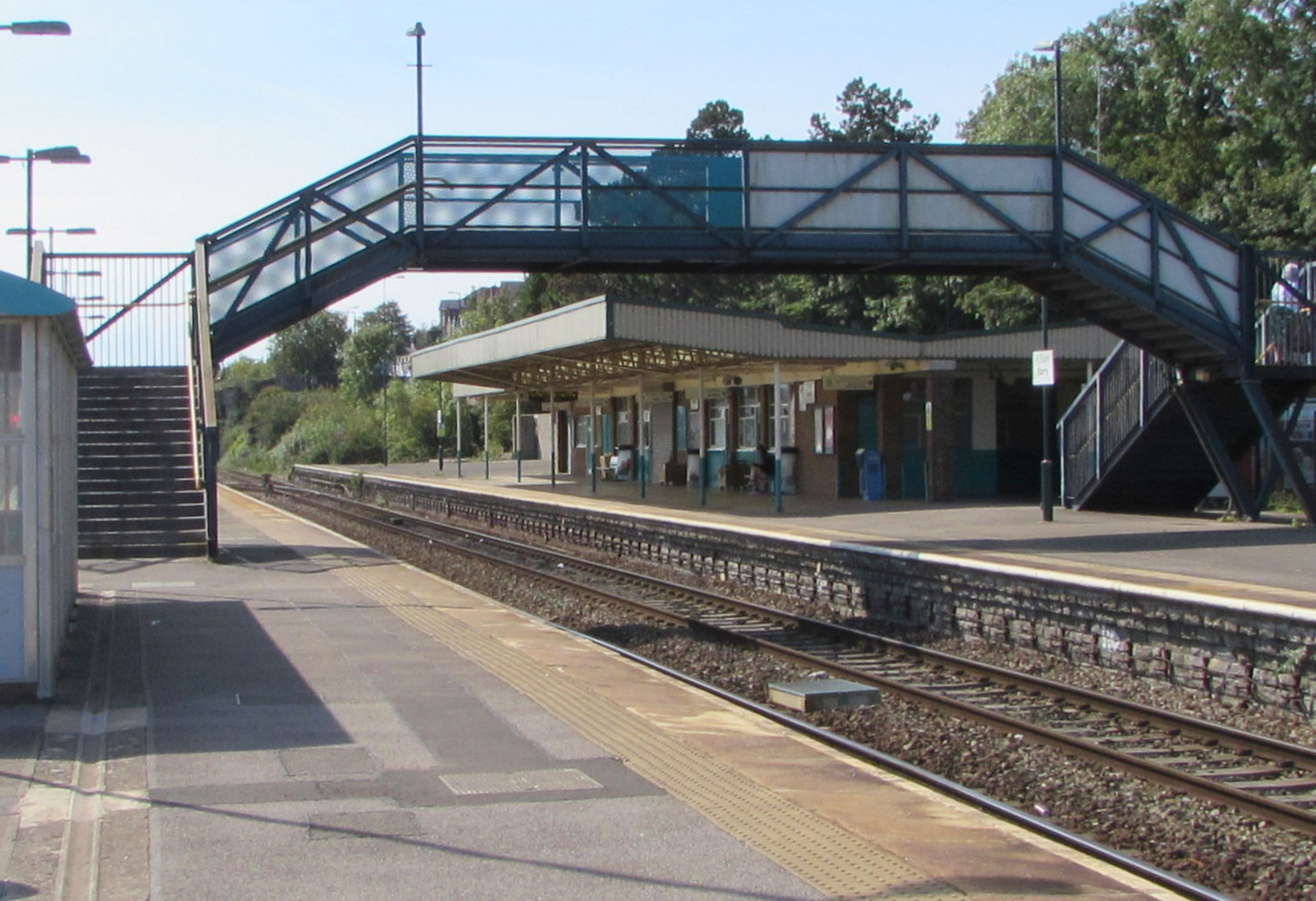
Station footbridge that was replaced in 2022 (pictured in 2019)

As at October 2019, step-free access is limited to platform 1, as the only route to platforms 2 and 3 is via a stepped footbridge. Disabled passengers are advised to travel to Barry station via Barry Island if arriving from Cardiff or if wishing to travel to Barry Island from Barry, to travel first to Barry Docks or if from Bridgend, to alight at Barry Docks station and change platforms for Barry Island.

To alleviate the problem of disabled persons or persons with heavy luggage having to use the stations in this way, by October 2019 it was planned to provide a new footbridge with combined lifts at Barry station by 2020 and at Cadoxton such a provision was almost complete by October 2019, where only a subway had been the means of crossing between platforms after June 1964 due to a foot crossing previously being provided but removed for safety reasons. (The same had applied at Barry station).

Installation of a new footbridge with lifts began in February 2022.

== Services ==
The station has a basic four trains per hour service (Mon-Sat) to Cardiff Central eastbound and three per hour to Barry Island and one per hour to Bridgend westbound. Eastbound trains usually continue beyond Cardiff Central to either Rhymney or Bargoed (half-hourly to each).

On Sundays, there are either 2 or 3 trains per hour to Cardiff Central (one each hour continuing to either Rhymney or Bargoed, half-hourly trains to Barry Island and one every two hours to Bridgend.

Services were mainly operated by Class 150 Sprinter units until 2023. As part of the South Wales Metro initiative, many of these have been replaced by Class 231 units, but this is a temporary measure, and they too shall be replaced by Class 756 units, allowing them to move to other duties.

Preceding station	National Rail	Following station
Barry Docks	Transport for Wales; Vale Line - Barry Island branch	Barry Island
Barry Docks	Transport for Wales; Vale Line - main route	Rhoose Cardiff International Airport

== Regeneration ==
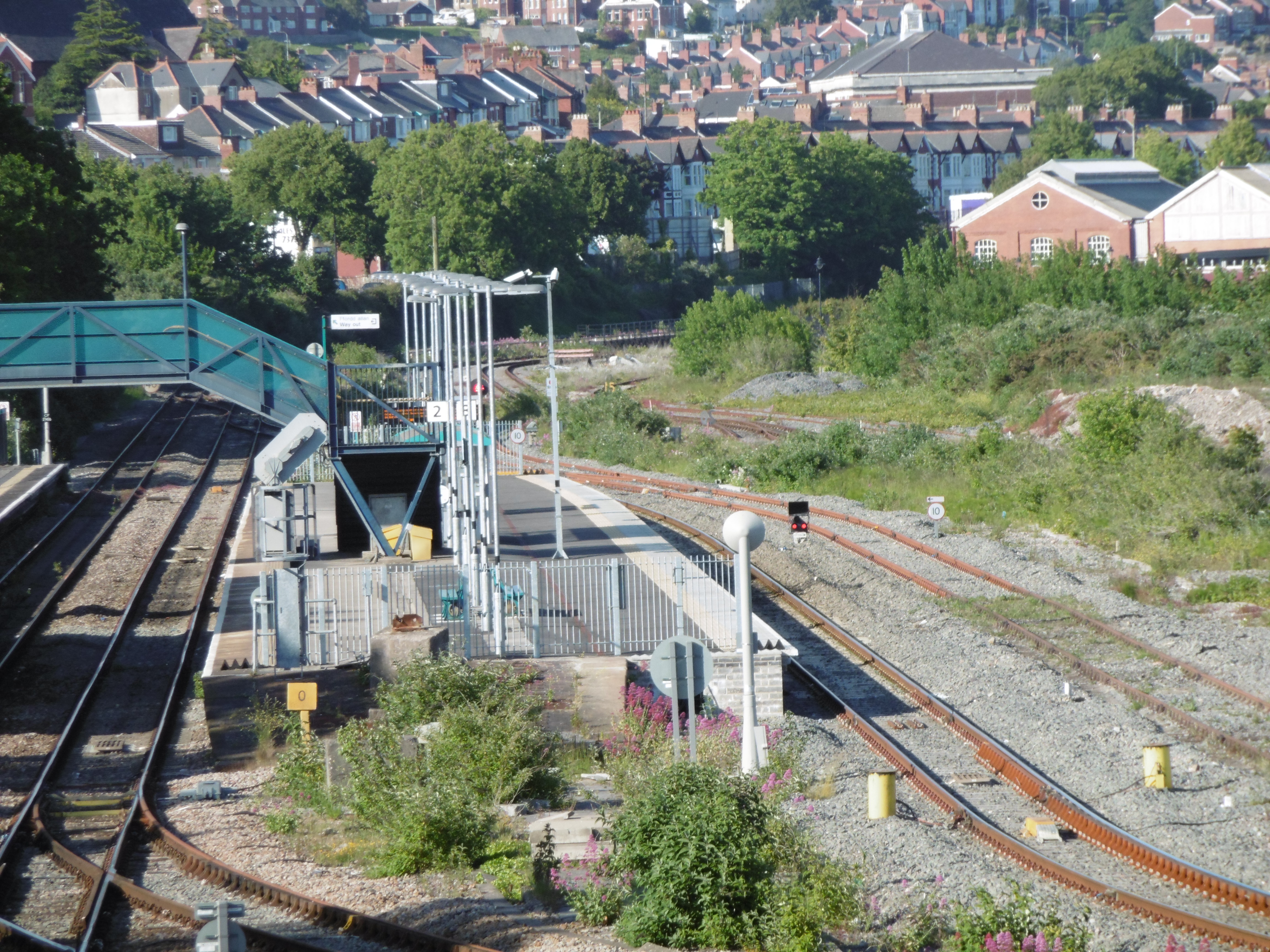
The rebuilt station showing the new Platform 3

As part of a £200m regeneration scheme to boost train capacity in Cardiff and the surrounding areas, Barry now has a third platform (Platform 3) which is now only used by down or sometimes up trains to & from Barry Island.

Up trains can and still do use the Barry station up platform (1) generally but as the new platform line is now bi-directional and signalled as such, it is also sometimes used for up passenger trains which can start from here if a 'catch-up' in the timetable is required, thereby cutting out a reversal at Barry Island. The laying of the bi-directional platform line had to be performed while essential signal wires and point rodding lying 1.75m from the platform wall, was still in place. The 'new' platform support blockwork was thus constructed so that its finished edge now lies 2.75m from the former obsolete platform edge.

During the months of construction, Barry signal box was taken out of use making the signal pull-wires and point rodding redundant and by week ending 28 March 2014, the box was demolished. Having removed the latter components, the void between old and new platform edges was backfilled, tarmacked over and new coping platform stones laid.

Prior to 1964, this platform was that of platform 4, platform 1 previously being the Bay platform where trains to Pontypridd via Wenvoe or sometimes Cardiff started. That area is now a Park & Ride facility. Platform 1 serves all up trains to Cardiff and beyond from either Barry Island or Bridgend. Platform 2 now serves only trains to Bridgend as the line to Barry Island from the junction south of platform 2 was curtailed during the remodelling project and acts as a safety overrun with a buffer stop 100m from the down facing points.

== Media ==
The station appeared in two episodes of Gavin & Stacey.
