= British Rail Class 756 =

Tri-mode multiple-unit passenger train

British Rail Class 756 FLIRT
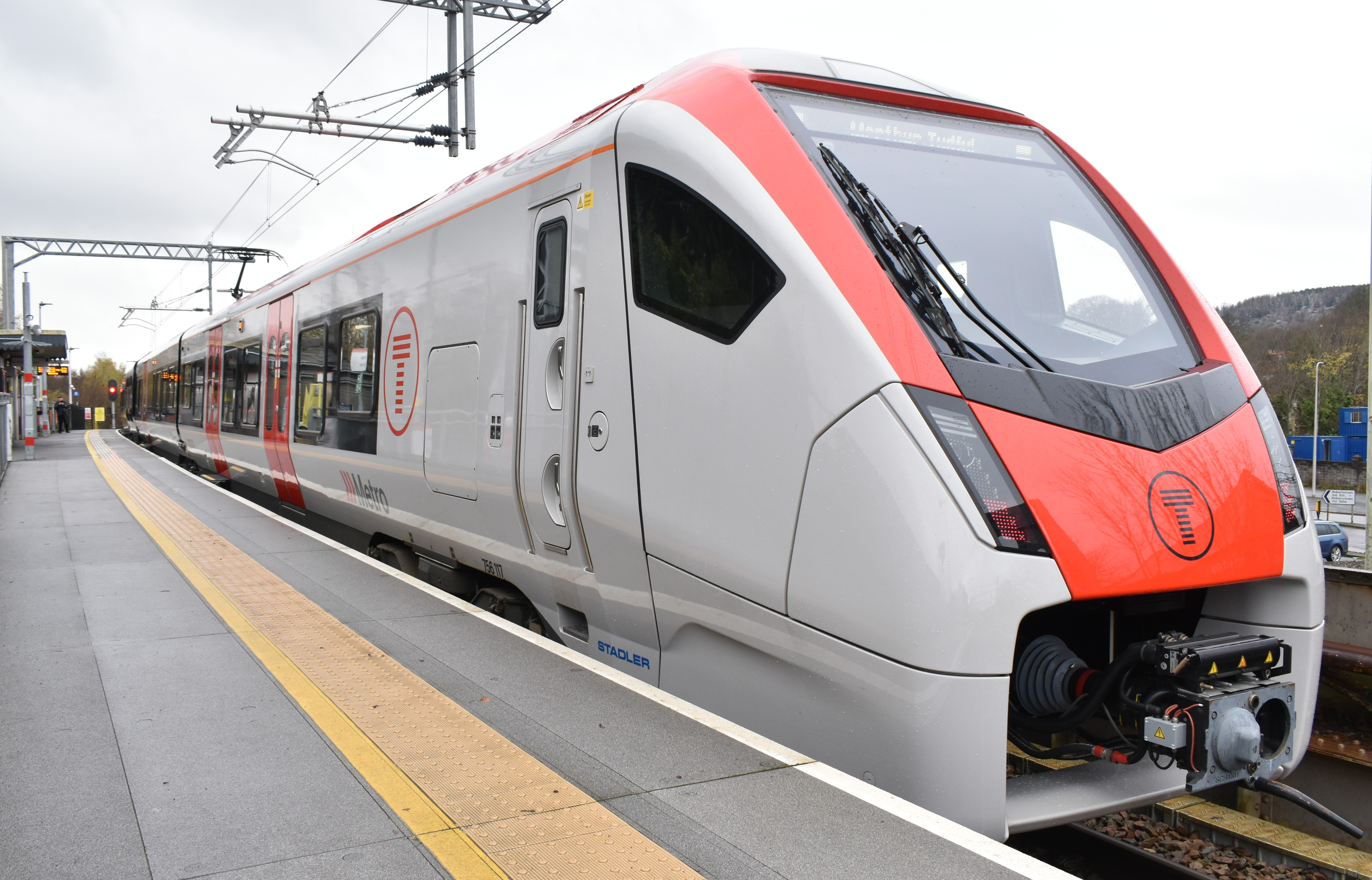
- Class 756 at Aberdare in 2024

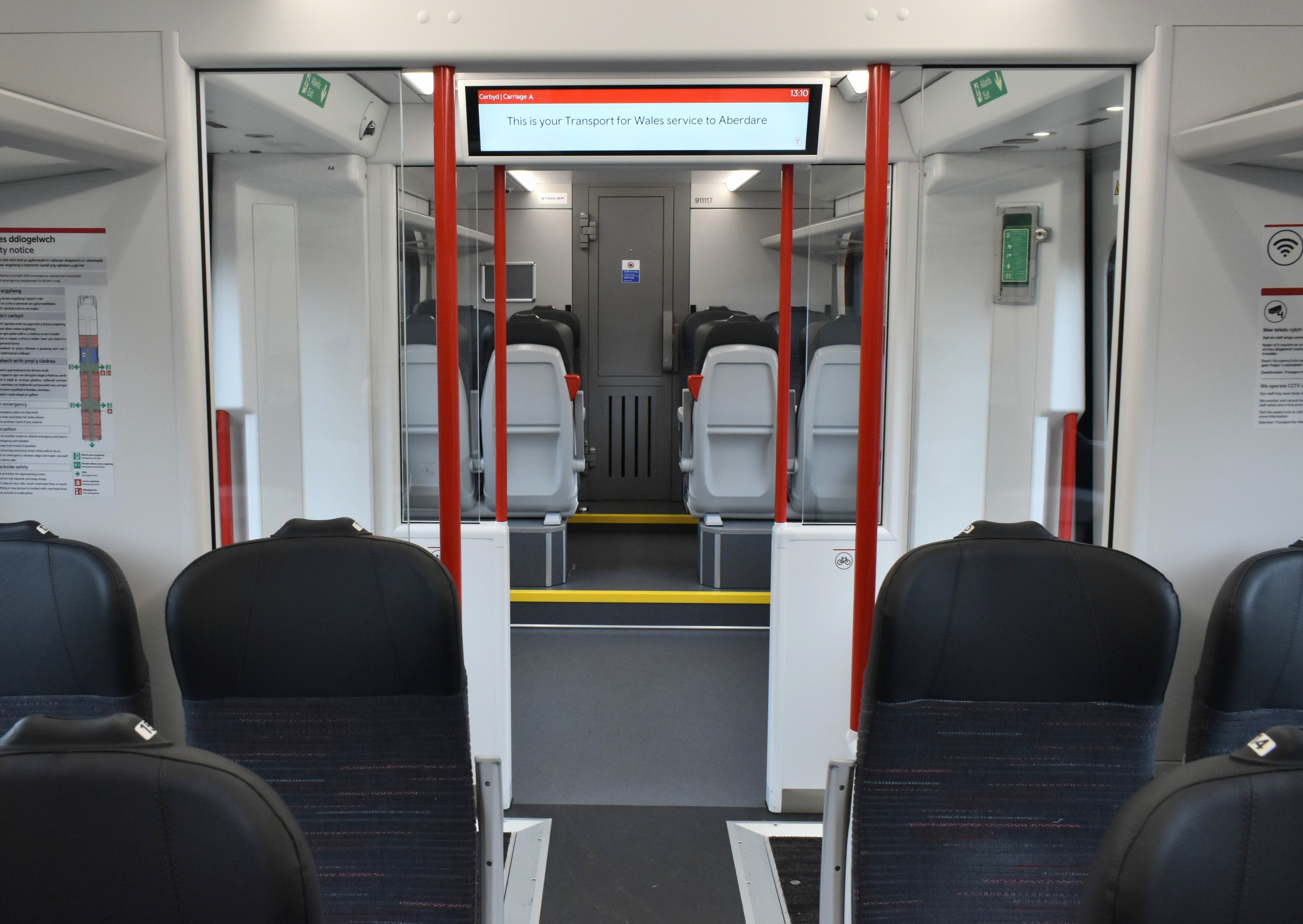
- Class 756 interior
- In service: 15 November 2024-Present
- Manufacturer: Stadler Rail
- Assembly: Stadler Bussnang AG
- Built at: Bussnang, Switzerland
- Family name: FLIRT
- Replaced: Class 150; Class 153; Class 769
- Constructed: 2021–2023
- Number built: 24 (7 × 756/0, 17 × 756/1)
- Formation: 3-car units: (Note: The Power Pack is technically a fourth or fifth vehicle in these units, but as it contains no passenger accommodation it is excluded from the count of passenger cars.); DMS-PP-PTSW-DMS; 4-car units: DMS-PTS-PP-PTSW-DMS
- Fleet numbers: 756/0: 756001–756007; 756/1: 756101–756117
- Capacity: 3-car: 118 seats, plus 24 tip-up and 148 standees; 4-car: 158 seats, plus 32 tip-up and 204 standees
- Owners: SMBC Leasing and Equitix
- Operator: Transport for Wales Rail
- Depot: Canton (Cardiff)

Specifications
- Car body construction: Aluminium
- Train length: 3-car: 65.0 m (213 ft 3 in); 4-car: 80.7 m (264 ft 9 in)
- Width: Passenger vehicles: 2.720 m (8 ft 11.1 in); Power Pack: 2.822 m (9 ft 3.1 in)
- Height: 3.915 m (12 ft 10.1 in)
- Floor height: 960 mm (3 ft 2 in)
- Doors: Double-leaf sliding plug, each 1.300 m (4 ft 3.2 in) wide (total 5 per side per 3-car, 7 per side per 4-car)
- Wheel diameter: Powered: 870 mm (34 in); Unpowered: 760 mm (30 in)
- Wheelbase: Bogies: 2.700 m (8 ft 10.3 in)
- Maximum speed: 75 mph (121 km/h)
- Traction system: IGBT
- Power output: On AC power: 2,600 kW (3,500 hp); On battery power: 1,300 kW (1,700 hp); On diesel power: 480 kW (640 hp)
- Tractive effort: Maximum starting: 200 kN (45,000 lbf)
- Acceleration: Maximum starting: 1.1 m/s^{2} (2.5 mph/s)
- Electric system: 25 kV 50 Hz AC overhead
- Current collection: Pantograph
- UIC classification: 3-car: Bo′2′2′2′Bo′; 4-car: Bo′2′2′2′2′Bo′
- Safety systems: AWS; TPWS; (plus provision for ETCS)
- Multiple working: Within class (max. 2 units)
- Track gauge: 4 ft 8 1/2 in (1,435 mm) standard gauge

Notes/references
- Sourced from unless otherwise noted.

The British Rail Class 756 FLIRT is a class of tri-mode multiple units built for Transport for Wales Rail by Swiss rolling stock manufacturer Stadler Rail. They are closely related to the Class 755 bi-mode units delivered by Stadler to Greater Anglia between 2018 and 2020, which can be powered either by overhead electric lines or on-board diesel generators. The Class 756 units also carry batteries as an additional source of traction power.

A total of 24 units were built, split between 7 three-car units and 17 four-car units.

== History ==
The Wales & Borders rail franchise, awarded to KeolisAmey Wales with effect from 14 October 2018, included a commitment requiring that the operator oversee a full fleet replacement during the franchise period. As part of this process, KeolisAmey placed an order with Stadler in February 2019 for the 24 FLIRT tri-mode units that came to be designated Class 756. The tri-mode capabilities are intended to facilitate operations over lines that have only been partially electrified. Production of the fleet was underway by mid-2021.

The Class 756 officially entered service on 18 November 2024, and for consecutive days, after initially entering service on one previous day of 15 November 2024.

== Operators ==
=== Transport for Wales ===
Transport for Wales Rail Class 756 units currently operate services between Cardiff-Merthyr Tydfil, Cardiff-Aberdare and Cardiff-Treherbert.

It is expected that the Class 756 units will move across to the Rhymney Line from late 2026 as the Class 398 tram-trains enter service.

== Technical details ==
Class 756 units have three or four passenger vehicles, along with a separate "Power Pack" vehicle near the centre of the unit that contains a diesel generator set and three battery modules. The diesel generator produces 480 kW (640 hp), while the batteries are capable of supplying up to 1,300 kW (1,700 hp). All vehicles are linked by unpowered Jacobs bogies, while the outermost bogie at each end of each unit carries the traction motors.

The batteries use lithium-titanium-oxide chemistry, with the capacity of 447 kWh for three-car units and 559 kWh for four-car units.

== Fleet details ==
Subclass	Operator	Qty.	Year built	Passenger cars	Unit nos.
756/0	Transport for Wales Rail	7	2021–2023	3	756001–756007
756/1	Transport for Wales Rail	17	2021–2023	4	756101–756117

=== Illustration ===
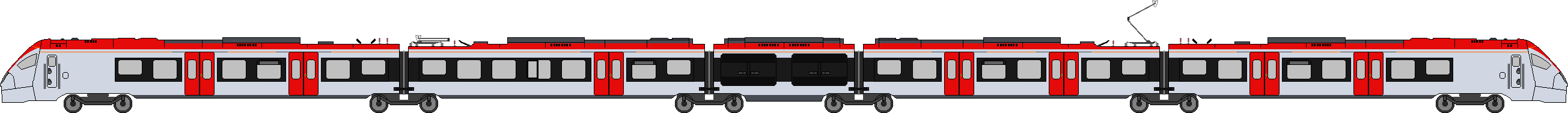
Illustration of a four-car Class 756 unit (based on concept art)

== See also ==
- British Rail Class 231 – A diesel multiple unit variant of the Stadler FLIRT UK platform also built for Transport for Wales Rail
- British Rail Class 745 – An electric multiple unit variant of the Stadler FLIRT UK platform built for Greater Anglia
- British Rail Class 755 – A bi-mode multiple unit variant of the Stadler FLIRT UK platform built for Greater Anglia
