= British Rail Class 398 =

Electric multiple unit train in South Wales

British Rail Class 398 Citylink
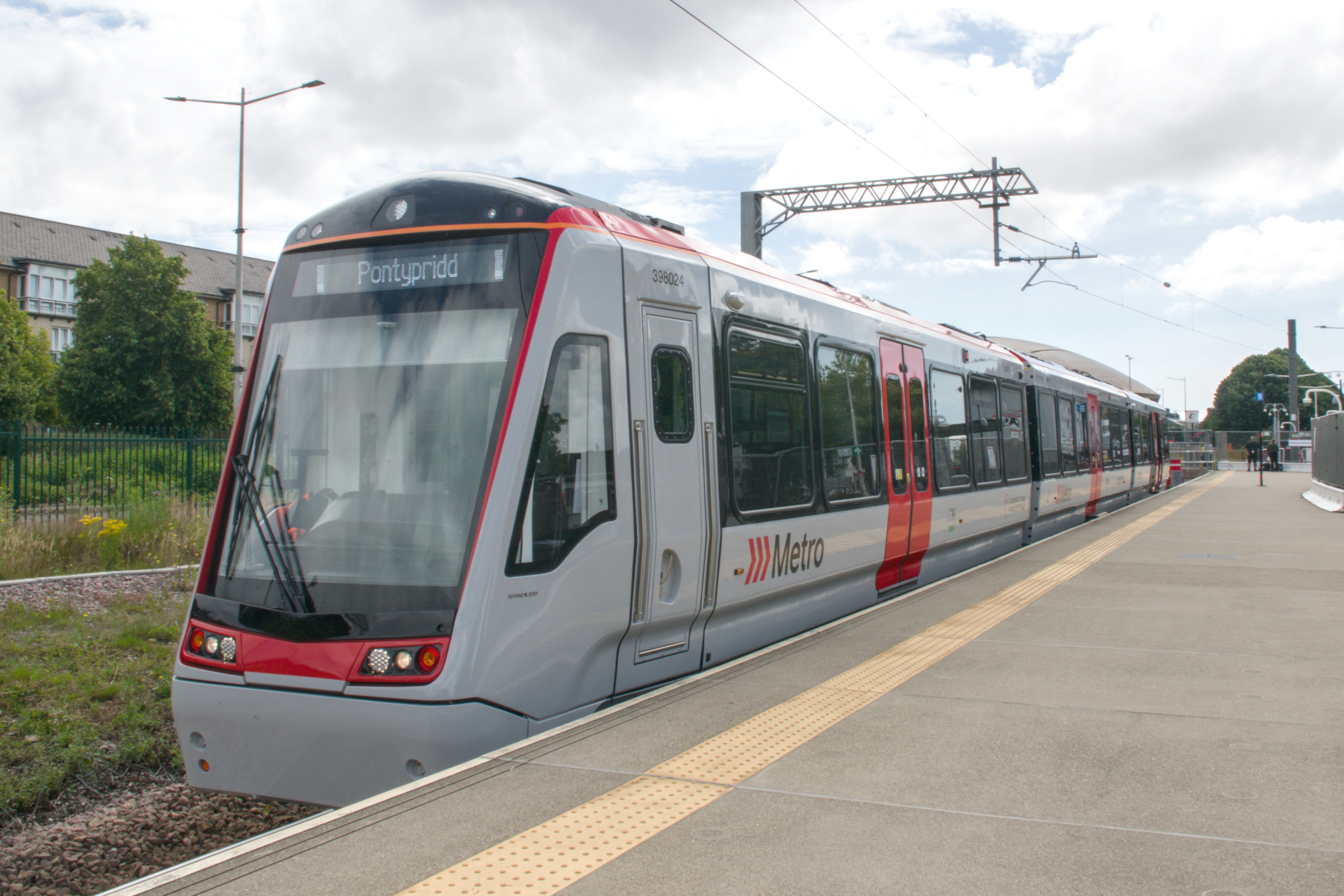
- Class 398 at Cardiff Bay in 2026

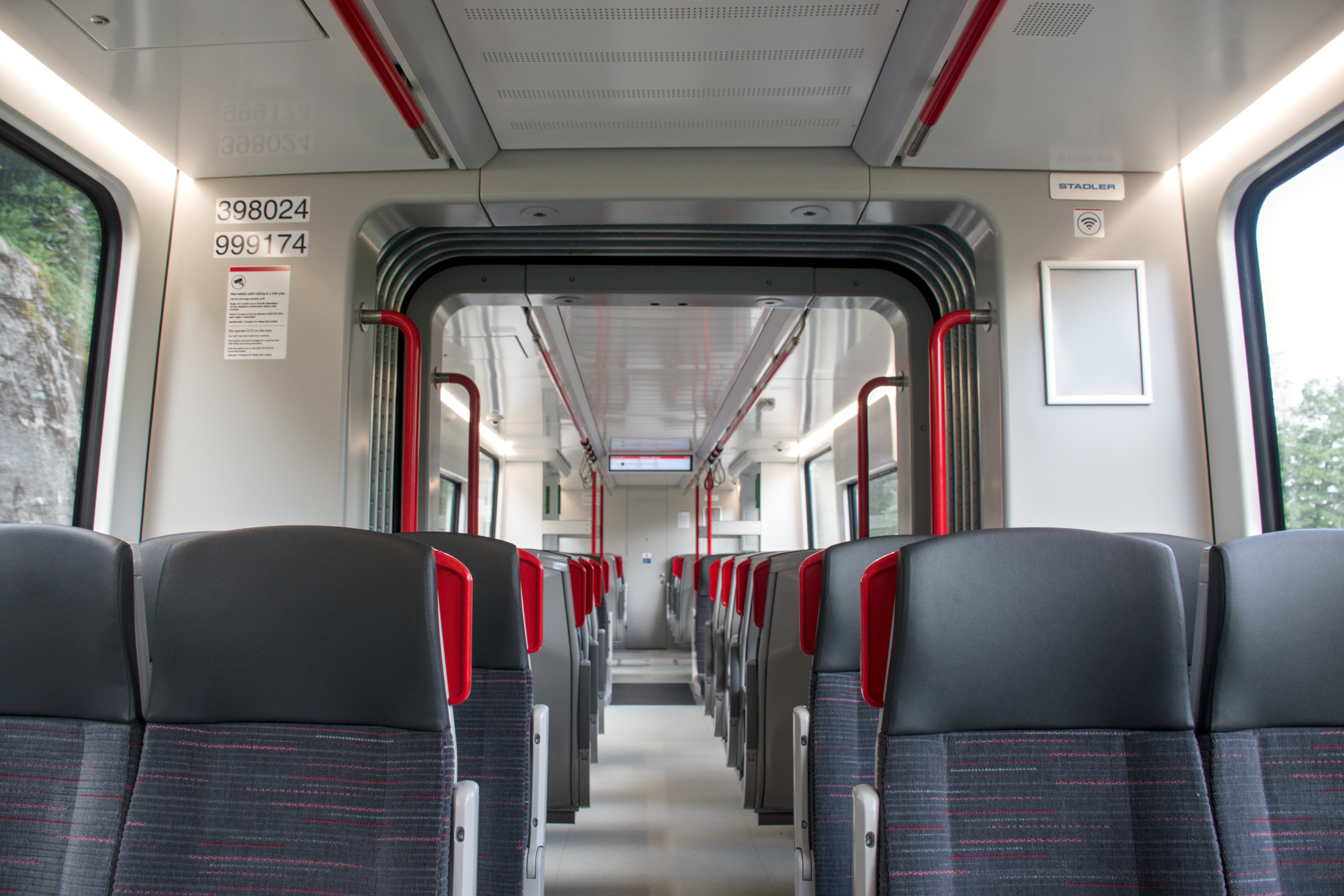
- Class 398 interior
- In service: 23 June 2026–present
- Manufacturer: Stadler Rail
- Assembly: Stadler Rail Valencia SAU
- Built at: Valencia, Spain
- Family name: Citylink
- Replaced: Class 150; Class 153
- Constructed: 2020–2023
- Number built: 36
- Formation: 3 cars per unit
- Fleet numbers: 398001–398036
- Capacity: 252 (126 seated, 126 standing)
- Owners: SMBC Leasing and Equitix
- Operator: Transport for Wales Rail
- Depot: Taffs Well

Specifications
- Car body construction: Stainless steel
- Train length: 40.07 m (131 ft 6 in)
- Width: 2.650 m (8 ft 8.3 in)
- Height: 3.865 m (12 ft 8.2 in)
- Floor height: 915 mm (36 in) at doors
- Doors: Double-leaf sliding plug (1 per side per vehicle)
- Wheel diameter: 740 mm (29 in)
- Maximum speed: 60 mph (train mode); 45 mph (tram mode)
- Weight: 73.22 tonnes
- Traction motors: 4 × TSA TMR 42-31-4, each of 150 kW (201 hp)
- Power output: 600 kW (805 hp)
- Electric system: 25 kV 50 Hz AC overhead
- Current collection: Pantograph
- UIC classification: Bo′+2′2′+Bo′
- Minimum turning radius: 25 m (82 ft)
- Coupling system: Scharfenberg Type 330
- Multiple working: Within class
- Track gauge: 4 ft 8 1/2 in (1,435 mm) standard gauge

Notes/references
- Sourced from except where otherwise noted.

The Class 398 Citylink is a fleet of 36 tram-train multiple units built for Transport for Wales Rail by Swiss rolling stock manufacturer Stadler Rail.

The units are equipped with traction battery packages, allowing them to operate over non-electrified sections of track in addition to those with 25 kV 50 Hz AC overhead supplies.

== History ==
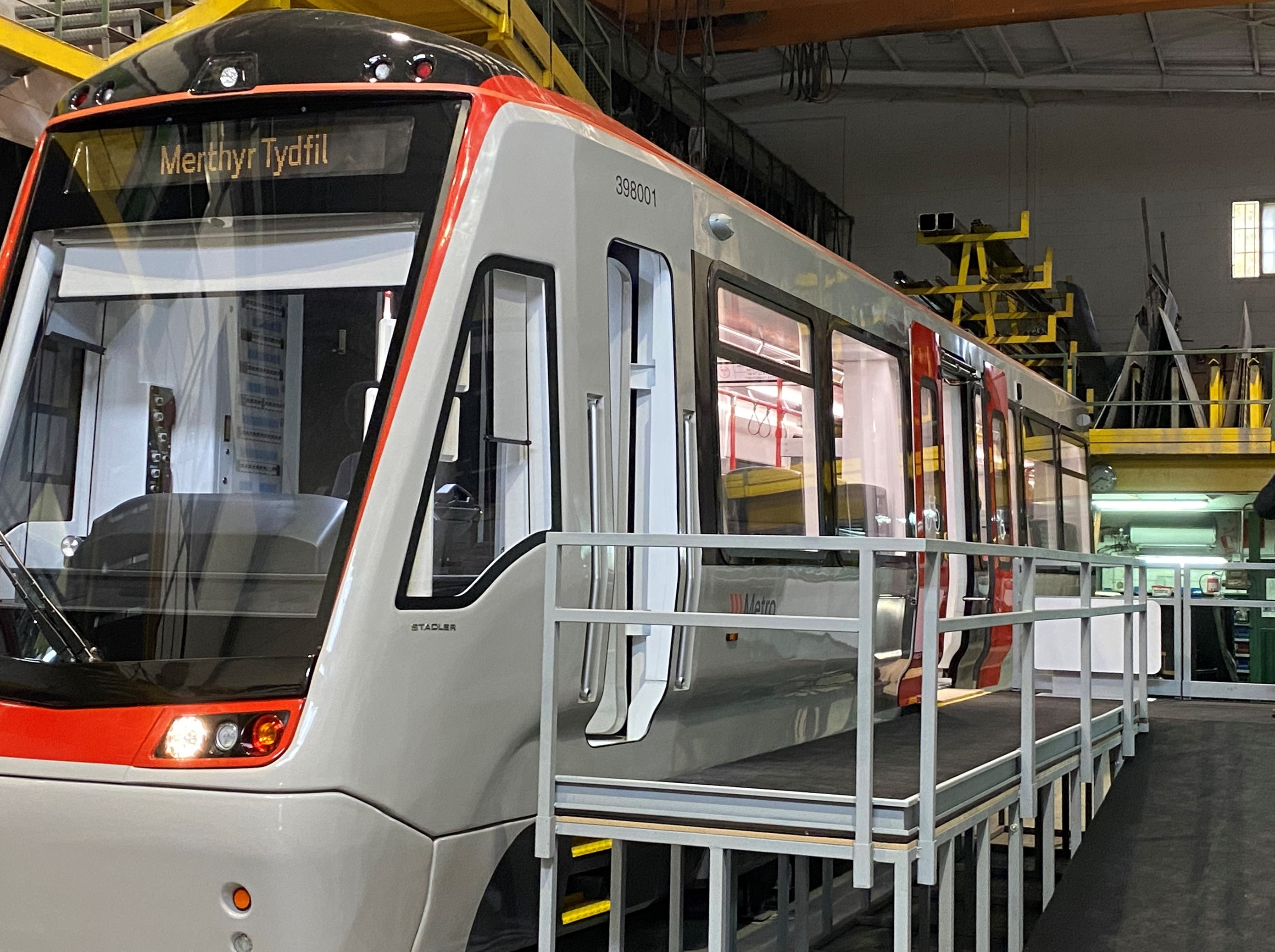
Exterior of a Class 398 mock-up in 2020

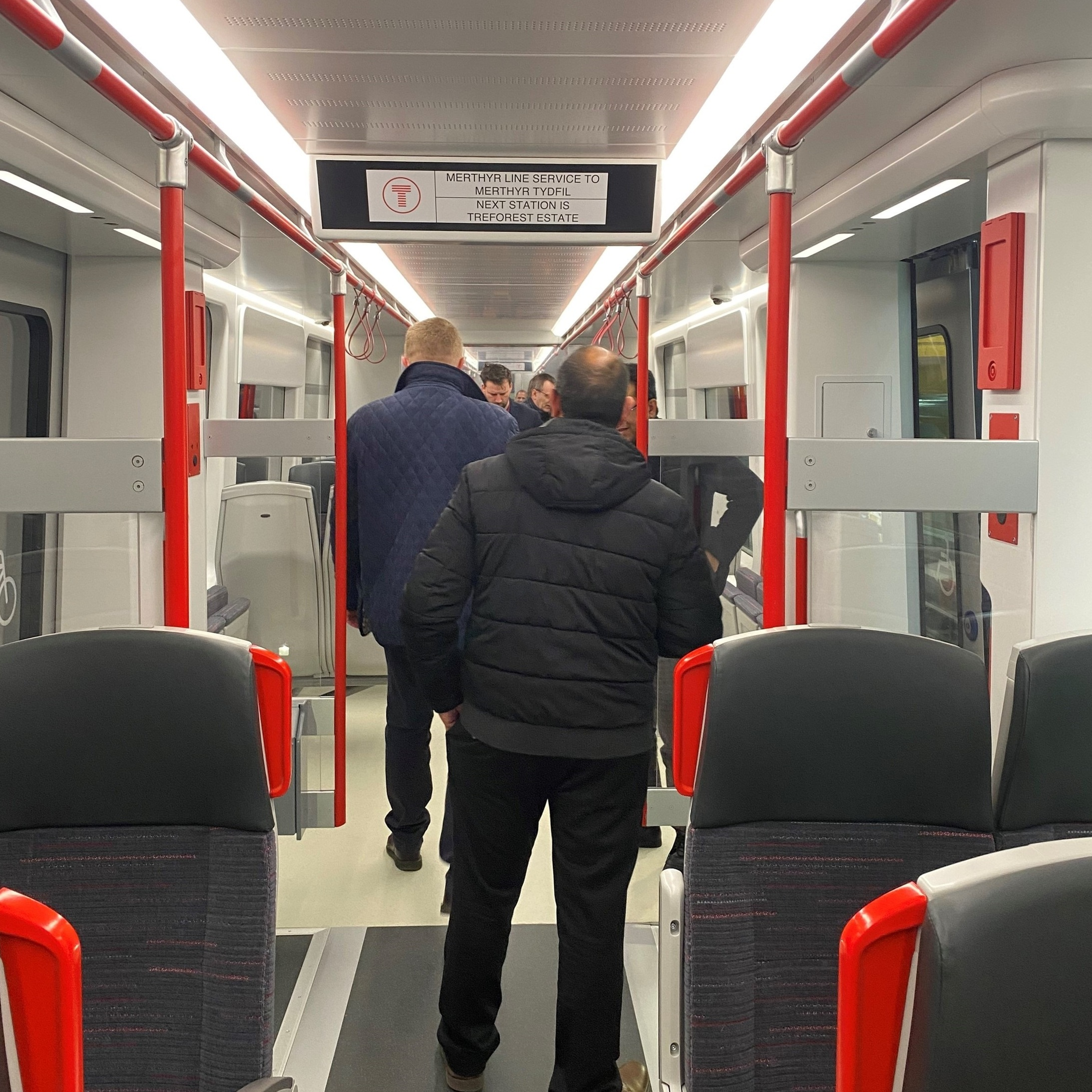
Interior of the Class 398 mock-up in 2020

The Wales & Borders rail franchise was awarded to KeolisAmey Wales in May 2018 and commenced on 14 October 2018. The franchise award included a requirement that the operator perform a full replacement of its fleets; as part of which process an order was placed with Stadler for delivery by 2023 of 36 tram-train units that would be capable of running on existing lines and also under battery power on the streets of Cardiff.

All units are three-car and are able to be coupled together to form a six-car train. Each unit has a maximum passenger capacity of 256, and the units have level boarding, as well as space for wheelchairs, pushchairs and bicycles. All seats have access to three-pin AC and USB-A DC power sockets.

The first unit to arrive in the UK was 398001 in May 2022, delivered from the Valencia works to the Rail Innovation & Development Centre in Melton, Leicestershire for testing on the Old Dalby Test Track.

The first unit was delivered to Taffs Well depot on 21 March 2023.

The first unit entered service on 23 June 2026, on services to Pontypridd and on the Cardiff Bay branch. However they were withdrawn from service on 19 September 2026 pending software updates after a number of failures.

== Operator ==
Transport for Wales Rail Class 398 units will operate services on the Rhondda, Merthyr and Cardiff City lines, and the Cardiff Bay Branch.

== Fleet details ==
Class	Operator	Qty.	Year built	Cars	Unit nos.
398	Transport for Wales Rail	36	2020–2023	3	398001–398036

=== Illustration ===
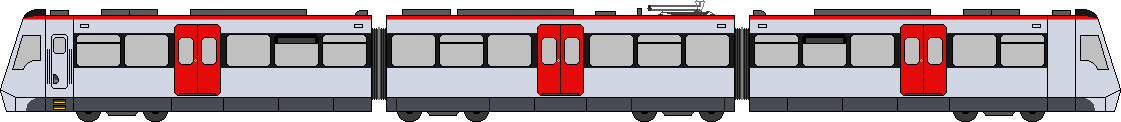
Illustration of a TfW Class 398 unit (based on concept art)

=== Named unit ===
Unit 398028 is named Myddfai.

== See also ==
- British Rail Class 399, related Vossloh Citylink tram-trains built in the mid-2010s for Sheffield Supertram
