= Transport for Wales Rail =

Welsh train operating company

- Trafnidiaeth Cymru Trenau

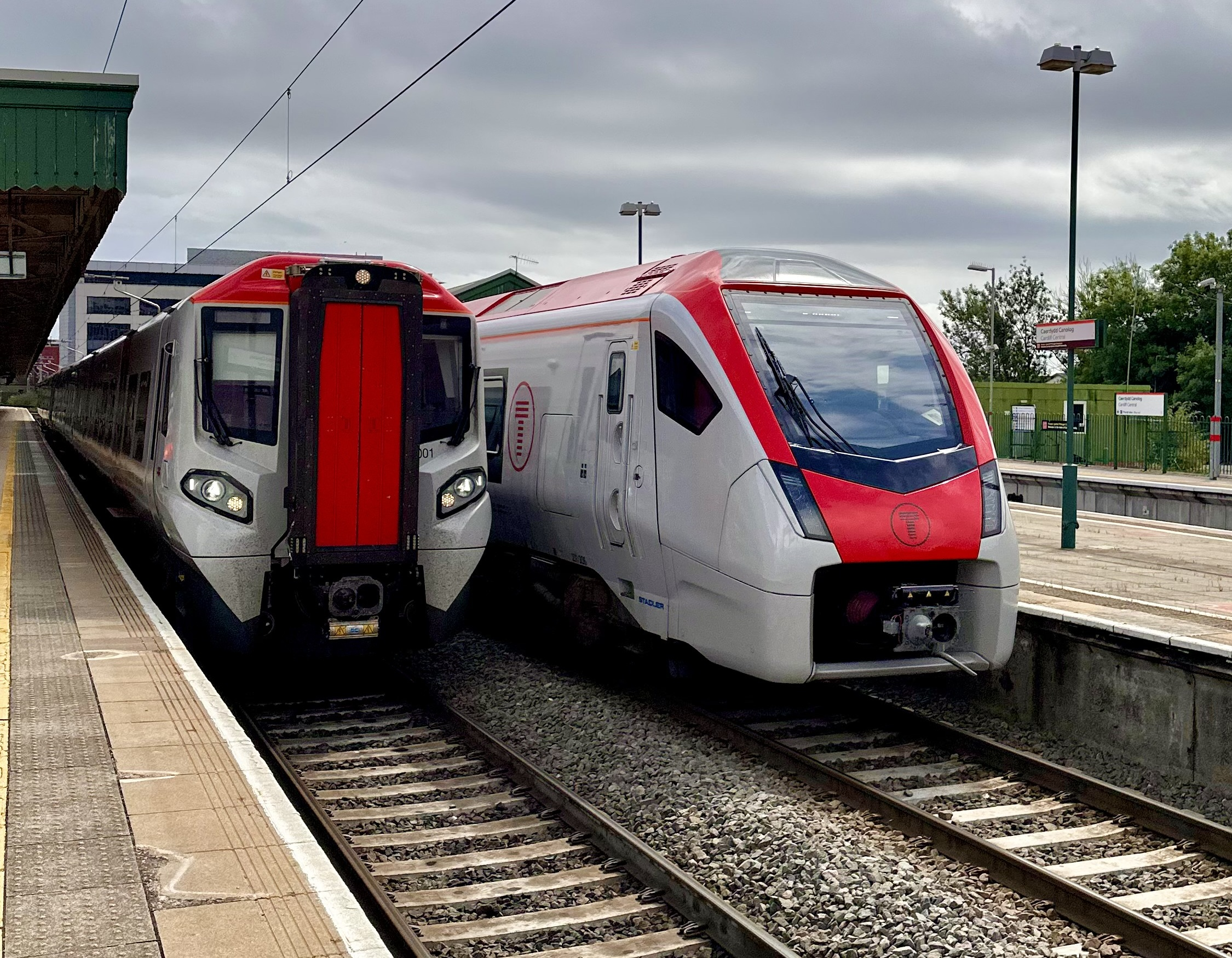
- A Class 197 and Class 231 at Cardiff Central

Overview
- Franchise: Wales & Borders
- Main region: Wales
- Other regions: North West England; West Midlands; South West England
- Fleet: Class 67; Class 150 Sprinter; Class 153 Super Sprinter; Class 158 Express Sprinter; Class 197 Civity; Class 230 D-Train; Class 231 FLIRT; Class 398 Citylink; Class 756 FLIRT; Mark 4 carriages
- Stations operated: 248
- Parent company: Transport for Wales (for Welsh Government)
- Headquarters: Pontypridd
- Reporting mark: AW (Note: Reporting mark inherited from Arriva Trains Wales, the operator of the franchise between 2003 and 2018.)
- Dates of operation: 7 February 2021–
- Predecessor: KeolisAmey Wales

Other
- Website: tfw.wales
Route map

Transport for Wales Rail Limited, branded as Transport for Wales and TfW Rail (Welsh: Trafnidiaeth Cymru and TrC Trenau), is a state-owned Welsh train operating company. It is a subsidiary of Transport for Wales (TfW), a Welsh Government-owned company. It commenced operation of the Wales & Borders franchise on 7 February 2021, succeeding KeolisAmey Wales.

Transport for Wales Rail manages 248 National Rail stations, including all 223 in Wales, and operates all passenger mainline services wholly within Wales, and services along the England–Wales border, many of which run into or through England.

== History ==
During May 2018, the Wales & Borders franchise was awarded by Transport for Wales to KeolisAmey Wales. Operations commenced in October 2018; at this point, the franchise was scheduled to run for 15 years.

Within two years, the franchisee had experienced a collapse in revenues and a significant reduction in passenger numbers, which was largely attributable to the economic consequences of the COVID-19 pandemic; this trend led to the financial circumstances of the KeolisAmey Wales franchise becoming untenable. In response, during October 2020, the Welsh Government announced that it would be transferring operations of the Wales & Borders franchise from KeolisAmey Wales to an operator of last resort. It was also stated that, despite the early termination of the franchise, KeolisAmey and Transport for Wales would continue a partnership to enact further improvements on the network; specifically, Amey Infrastructure Wales (AIW) would remain involved in the delivery of various key projects, such as upgrading the Core Valley Lines.

On 7 February 2021, the Welsh Government-owned operator Transport for Wales Rail Limited took over running the franchise's services.

Perhaps one of the most prominent undertaking for TfW Rail is the implementation and future operation of the South Wales Metro; this will involve various infrastructure changes, including a brand new depot at Taff's Well, as well as a new fleet of trains built by Stadler Rail. One of the more unusual elements of this programme is the fleet of Class 398 battery-electric tram-trains, which will operate on both on-street tracks and conventional railways.

Since taking on operations, Transport for Wales has introduced numerous changes to ticketing. On 24 January 2021, it launched a pilot scheme involving 90 convenience stores across South Wales to provide a new means of purchasing rail tickets; this scheme operated via a partnership with Payzone and used SilverRail retailing technology. TfW is the first UK-based train operating company to partner with Payzone. During August 2023, this arrangement was extended to North Wales and the Wirral via a partnership between Transport for Wales and numerous local businesses under which train tickets became available for purchase from local retail outlets offering a Payzone facility. That same year, a new ticketing arrangement with Unicard came into effect, enabling Transport for Wales to become the first British train operator outside of London to deploy contactless EMV services.

Funding for Transport for Wales Rail's operations is sourced from both the Welsh and British governments. Cost increases, such as the South Wales Metro's original budget of £738 million having risen to in excess of £1 billion, have been politically controversial. During October 2023, the Welsh government announced that it would provide an additional £125 million for Transport for Wales in response to a revenue shortfall from fares; this funding top-up was a substantial rise at a time of considerable budgetary pressure.

In 2025 Transport for Wales announced they had reopened the Barry Depot to passenger train drivers.

== Services ==
As of May 2026, Transport for Wales Rail operates these regular and daily services Monday to Friday:

North Wales Coast Line and North Wales to South Wales
Route	tph	Calling at
Birmingham International to Llandudno Junction	1/2	Birmingham New Street, Sandwell & Dudley, Wolverhampton, Telford Central, Wellington, Shrewsbury, Gobowen, Chirk, Ruabon, Wrexham General, Chester, Flint, Prestatyn, Rhyl, Colwyn Bay
Holyhead to Cardiff Central	1/2	Valley, Rhosneigr, (Note: Request stop) Tŷ Croes, Bodorgan, Llanfairpwll, Bangor, Llandudno Junction, Colwyn Bay, Rhyl, Prestatyn, Flint, Chester, Wrexham General, Ruabon, Chirk, Gobowen, Shrewsbury, Church Stretton, Craven Arms, Ludlow, Leominster, Hereford, Abergavenny, Pontypool and New Inn, Cwmbran, Newport
Holyhead to Manchester Airport	1	Llanfairpwll, Bangor, Llanfairfechan, Penmaenmawr, Conwy, Llandudno Junction, Colwyn Bay, Rhyl, Prestatyn, Flint, Shotton, Chester, Helsby, Frodsham, Runcorn East, Warrington Bank Quay, Earlestown, Newton-le-Willows, Manchester Oxford Road, Manchester Piccadilly, East Didsbury
Marches, West Wales, Crewe–Shrewsbury Lines and Swanline
Route	tph	Calling at
Manchester Piccadilly to Cardiff Central	1	Stockport, Wilmslow, Crewe, Nantwich (1 tp2h), Whitchurch (1 tp2h), Shrewsbury, Church Stretton (1 tp2h), Craven Arms (1 tp2h), Ludlow, Leominster, Hereford, Abergavenny, Cwmbran, Newport; Nantwich, Whitchurch, Church Stretton, and Craven Arms are all served by the same train; 7 trains per day are extended towards Swansea with further extensions to/from Fishguard Harbour, Milford Haven, or Pembroke Dock, calling at all respective intermediate stations (see below)
Cardiff Central to Fishguard Harbour	1/3	Bridgend, Port Talbot Parkway, Neath, Swansea, Gowerton, Llanelli, Pembrey and Burry Port, Kidwelly, Ferryside, Carmarthen, Whitland; Clunderwen, Clarbeston Road, Fishguard and Goodwick
Cardiff Central to Milford Haven	1/2	Bridgend, Port Talbot Parkway, Neath, Swansea, Gowerton, Llanelli, Pembrey and Burry Port, Kidwelly, Ferryside, Carmarthen, Whitland, Clunderwen, Clarbeston Road, Haverfordwest, Johnston; 5 trains per day Cardiff-bound extend to Manchester Piccadilly, see above
Cardiff Central to Pembroke Dock	1/2	Pontyclun, Llanharan, Pencoed, Bridgend, Pyle, Port Talbot Parkway, Baglan, Briton Ferry, Neath, Skewen, Llansamlet, Swansea, Gowerton, Llanelli, Pembrey and Burry Port, Kidwelly, Ferryside, Carmarthen, Whitland, Narberth, Kilgetty, Saundersfoot, Tenby, Penally, Manorbier, Lamphey, Pembroke
Crewe to Shrewsbury	1/2	Nantwich, Wrenbury, Whitchurch, Prees, Wem, Yorton
Cambrian Line
Route	tph	Calling at
Birmingham International to Aberystwyth	1/2	Birmingham New Street, Sandwell & Dudley, Wolverhampton, Telford Central, Wellington, Shrewsbury, Welshpool, Newtown, Caersws, Machynlleth, Dovey Junction, Borth, Bow Street; This route splits/merges at Machynlleth with the route to Pwllheli (see below)
Birmingham International to Pwllheli	1/2	Birmingham New Street, Sandwell & Dudley, Wolverhampton, Telford Central, Wellington, Shrewsbury, Welshpool, Newtown, Caersws, Machynlleth, Dovey Junction, Penhelig, Aberdovey, Tywyn, Tonfanau, Llwyngwril, Fairbourne, Morfa Mawddach, Barmouth, Llanaber, Talybont, Dyffryn Ardudwy, Llanbedr, Pensarn, Llandanwg, Harlech, Tygwyn, Talsarnau, Llandecwyn, Penrhyndeudraeth, Minffordd, Porthmadog, Criccieth, Penychain, Abererch; This route splits/merges at Machynlleth with the route to Aberystwyth (see above)
Heart of Wales line
Route	tpd	Calling at
Shrewsbury to Swansea	4	Church Stretton, Craven Arms, Broome, Hopton Heath, Bucknell, (Note: Request stop for services towards Swansea) Knighton, Knucklas, Llangynllo, Llanbister Road, Dolau, Pen-y-Bont, Llandrindod, Builth Road, Cilmeri, Garth, Llangammarch, Llanwrtyd, Sugar Loaf, Cynghordy, Llandovery, Llanwrda, Llangadog, Llandeilo, Ffairfach (Note: Request stop for services towards Shrewsbury) , Llandybie, Ammanford, Pantyffynnon, Pontarddulais, Llangennech, Bynea, Llanelli, Gowerton
Conwy Valley line
Route	tpd	Calling at
Llandudno to Blaenau Ffestiniog	6	Deganwy, Llandudno Junction, Glan Conwy, Tal-y-Cafn, (Note: Request stop for services towards Llandudno) Dolgarrog, North Llanrwst, Llanrwst, Betws-y-Coed, Pont-y-Pant, Dolwyddelan, Roman Bridge
Borderlands line
Route	tph	Calling at
Bidston to Wrexham Central	4/3	Upton, Heswall, Neston, Hawarden Bridge, Shotton, Hawarden, Buckley, Penyffordd, Hope, Caergwrle, Cefn-y-Bedd, Gwersyllt, Wrexham General
Wrexham–Crewe and Liverpool–Llandudno
Route	tph	Calling at
Wrexham General to Crewe	1	Chester
Liverpool Lime Street to Llandudno	1	Liverpool South Parkway, Runcorn, Frodsham, Helsby, Chester, Shotton, Flint, Prestatyn, Rhyl, Abergele & Pensarn, Colwyn Bay, Llandudno Junction, Deganwy
Cardiff–Cheltenham
Route	tph	Calling at
Cardiff Central to Cheltenham Spa	1	Newport, Severn Tunnel Junction, Caldicot, Chepstow, Lydney, Gloucester
Ebbw Valley Railway and Maesteg line
Route	tph	Calling at
Ebbw Vale Town to Maesteg	1	Ebbw Vale Parkway, Llanhilleth, Newbridge, Crosskeys, Risca and Pontymister, Rogerstone, Pye Corner, Cardiff Central, Pontyclun, Llanharan, Pencoed, Bridgend, Wildmill, Sarn, Tondu, Garth, Maesteg (Ewenny Road)
Ebbw Vale Town to Newport	1	Ebbw Vale Parkway, Llanhilleth, Newbridge, Crosskeys, Risca and Pontymister, Rogerstone, Pye Corner
Rhondda, Merthyr, City and Butetown branch lines
Route	tph	Calling at
Cardiff Central to Treherbert	2	Cardiff Queen Street, Cathays, Llandaf, Radyr, Taffs Well, Trefforest Estate, Trefforest, Pontypridd, Trehafod, Porth, Dinas Rhondda, Tonypandy, Llwynypia, Ystrad Rhondda, Ton Pentre, Treorchy, Ynyswen
Merthyr Tydfil to Aberdare via Cardiff Central	2	Pentre-bach, Troed-y-rhiw, Merthyr Vale, Quakers Yard, Abercynon, Pontypridd, Trefforest, Trefforest Estate, Taffs Well, Radyr, Llandaf, Cathays, Cardiff Queen Street, Cardiff Central, Ninian Park, Waun-gron Park, Fairwater, Danescourt, Radyr, Taffs Well, Trefforest Estate, Trefforest, Pontypridd, Abercynon, Penrhiwceiber, Mountain Ash, Fernhill, Cwmbach
Cardiff Bay to Pontypridd	2	Cardiff Queen Street, Cathays, Llandaf, Radyr, Taffs Well, Trefforest Estate, Trefforest
Cardiff Bay to Cardiff Queen Street	2	Shuttle service
Rhymney, Vale of Glamorgan and Coryton lines
Route	tph	Calling at
Bridgend to Rhymney	1	Llantwit Major, Rhoose Cardiff International Airport, Barry, Barry Docks, Cadoxton, Dinas Powys, Eastbrook, Cogan, Grangetown, Cardiff Central, Cardiff Queen Street, Heath High Level, Llanishen, Lisvane and Thornhill, Caerphilly, Aber, Llanbradach, Ystrad Mynach, Hengoed, Pengam, Bargoed, Brithdir, Tir-Phil, Pontlottyn
Barry Island to Rhymney	1	Barry, Barry Docks, Cadoxton, Dinas Powys, Eastbrook, Cogan, Grangetown, Cardiff Central, Cardiff Queen Street, Heath High Level, Llanishen, Lisvane and Thornhill, Caerphilly, Aber, Llanbradach, Ystrad Mynach, Hengoed, Pengam, Bargoed
Barry Island to Bargoed	2	Barry, Barry Docks, Cadoxton, Dinas Powys, Eastbrook, Cogan, Grangetown, Cardiff Central, Cardiff Queen Street, Heath High Level, Llanishen, Lisvane and Thornhill, Caerphilly, Aber, Energlyn & Churchill Park, Llanbradach, Ystrad Mynach, Hengoed, Pengam, Gilfach Fargoed (1tph)
Penarth to Caerphilly	2	Dingle Road, Grangetown, Cardiff Central, Cardiff Queen Street, Heath High Level, Llanishen, Lisvane and Thornhill
Penarth to Coryton	2	Dingle Road, Grangetown, Cardiff Central, Cardiff Queen Street, Heath Low Level, Ty Glas, Birchgrove, Rhiwbina, Whitchurch

== Rolling stock ==
=== Overview ===
Transport for Wales Rail inherited KeolisAmey Wales's fleet, which consisted of Class 143, 150, 153, 158, 170 and 175 diesel multiple units, Class 230 diesel-battery electric multiple units, Class 769 bi-mode multiple units and Mark 4 and DVT sets with an allocation of Class 67 locomotives.

During its first years of operation, TfW Rail enacted multiple fleet changes. This was largely driven by pre-existing procurement arrangements that had been arranged by KeolisAmey Wales; at one point, it was intended for the majority of TfW Rail's inherited rolling stock, along with additional temporary vehicles, to be replaced by 2023 (with the exception of the Class 67 locomotives). Under these plans, the Class 197 and 231 diesel multiple units, Class 756 tri-mode multiple units and Class 398 tram-trains were set to replace the Class 150, Class 153, and Class 158 fleets.

Family	Class	Subclass	Image	Type	Top speed		Number	Carriages	Routes operated	Built
Family	Class	Subclass	Image	Type	mph	km/h	Number	Carriages	Routes operated	Built
Locomotive-hauled stock
Premier Service	67	–		Diesel locomotive	125	200	12	–	Manchester Piccadilly–Cardiff Central/Swansea; Holyhead–Cardiff Central	1999–2000
Premier Service	Mark 4	–		Coach	140	225	37	4 or 5	Manchester Piccadilly–Cardiff Central/Swansea; Holyhead–Cardiff Central; To run as 7 x 4 or 5 coach + DVT sets with a spare DVT, SV and TOE	1989–1992
Premier Service	Driving Van Trailer	–		Control car	140	225	8	1	Manchester Piccadilly–Cardiff Central/Swansea; Holyhead–Cardiff Central; To run as 7 x 4 or 5 coach + DVT sets with a spare DVT, SV and TOE	1989–1992
Diesel multiple unit
Sprinter	150	150/2		DMU	75	120	31	2	Valley Lines & Cardiff local routes; Heart of Wales/West Wales lines; Regional services between south and west Wales, north-west England and south-west England	1987
Sprinter	153 Super Sprinter	–		DMU	75	120	13	1	Valley Lines & Cardiff local routes; Heart of Wales/West Wales lines; Regional services between south and west Wales, north-west England and south-west England	1987–1988
Sprinter	158 Express Sprinter	158/0		DMU	90	145	24	2	Cambrian Line; West Wales lines; North Wales Coast Line; Shrewsbury–Chester line; Regional services between south and north Wales, north-west England and south-west England	1989–1992
CAF Civity	197	197/0		DMU	100	161	51 (21 ETCS-fitted; dubbed 197e)	2	Regional services between North, South and West Wales and England; Borderlands line; Conwy Valley line; Cambrian Line (ETCS-fitted units only): Machynlleth–Pwllheli from October 2026	From 2020
CAF Civity	197	197/1		DMU	100	161	26	3	Regional services between North, South and West Wales and England; Borderlands line; Conwy Valley line	From 2020
Diesel-battery electric multiple unit
Vivarail D-Train	230	230/0		D BEMU	60	97	5	3	Borderlands line	2019–2020
Diesel-electric multiple unit
Stadler FLIRT	231	231/0		DEMU	90	145	11	4	Valley Lines (Rhymney line and southwards to Barry Island and Bridgend via Vale of Glamorgan Line)	2020–2022
Tri-mode multiple units
Stadler FLIRT	756	756/0		TMU	75	120	7	3	Valley Lines (Merthyr Tydfil and Aberdare lines)	2021–2023
Stadler FLIRT	756	756/1		TMU	75	120	17	4	Valley Lines (Merthyr Tydfil and Aberdare lines)	2021–2023
Tram-trains
Stadler Citylink	398	398/0		Tram-train	62	100	36	3	Light rapid transit Services between Cardiff Bay and Treherbert, Aberdare, and Merthyr Tydfil	From 2020

=== Newly introduced / future fleet ===
==== Cascades and refurbishments ====
===== Class 67-hauled Mark 4 set =====
Six Class 67 locomotives have been adapted to work with three sets each comprising four Mark 4 carriages and a Mark 4 Driving Van Trailer, which will replace the Mark 3 stock previously used on locomotive-hauled services. The twelve carriages and three DVTs were able to cascade from London North Eastern Railway, as a result of the introduction of Class 800s and Class 801s on the East Coast Main Line. The Mark 4 coaches have retained the Virgin Trains East Coast livery, but with Transport for Wales labels attached. The Mark 4 Driving Van Trailers will be repainted into the new Transport for Wales livery. Four of the six Class 67 locomotives have been repainted into TfW Rail livery. TfW Rail introduced the Mark 4 sets in June 2021 on Cardiff to Holyhead services, and from December 2022 they will operate services between Swansea and Manchester using trains which had previously been planned to be used on the Blackpool route by Grand Central. The three Mark 4 sets will be retained and will remain on the routes they will work from their date of introduction on TfW Rail services.

===== Class 153 =====
TfW Rail will retain eight Class 153 units to operate services on the Heart of Wales line.

==== New trains ====
For the longer term fleet replacement, 148 brand new trains will be introduced including 77 CAF Civity trains (Class 197), 35 FLIRT trains (Class 231 and Class 756) and 36 Citylink tram-trains (Class 398) have been ordered. The addition of these trains to the fleet, from 2021 to 2024 but mostly in 2022–23, will allow the 109 (total) Class 150, 153 (13 by then), 158, 175 and 769 units to be withdrawn.

===== Class 197 Civity =====
A total of 77 Class 197 Civity diesel multiple units were ordered from CAF for long-distance routes. These trains have end gangways, but fewer toilets than the Class 158 and Class 175 DMUs they replace. They are however faster, with more powerful engines and more efficient transmissions for better acceleration, as well as a higher top speed than the Class 158. 51 units are two-cars in length and 26 are three-cars in length.

CAF undertook the fabrication, welding and painting of the Class 197 fleet in their factory in Beasain, Spain. The first Driving Motor carriage vehicle bodyshell had largely passed this stage by 12 February 2020, when it was pictured in the Beasain factory. The painted bodyshells were shipped to Newport, South Wales, for further assembly and component fit-out at CAF's new UK factory in Llanwern.

===== Class 230 D-Train =====
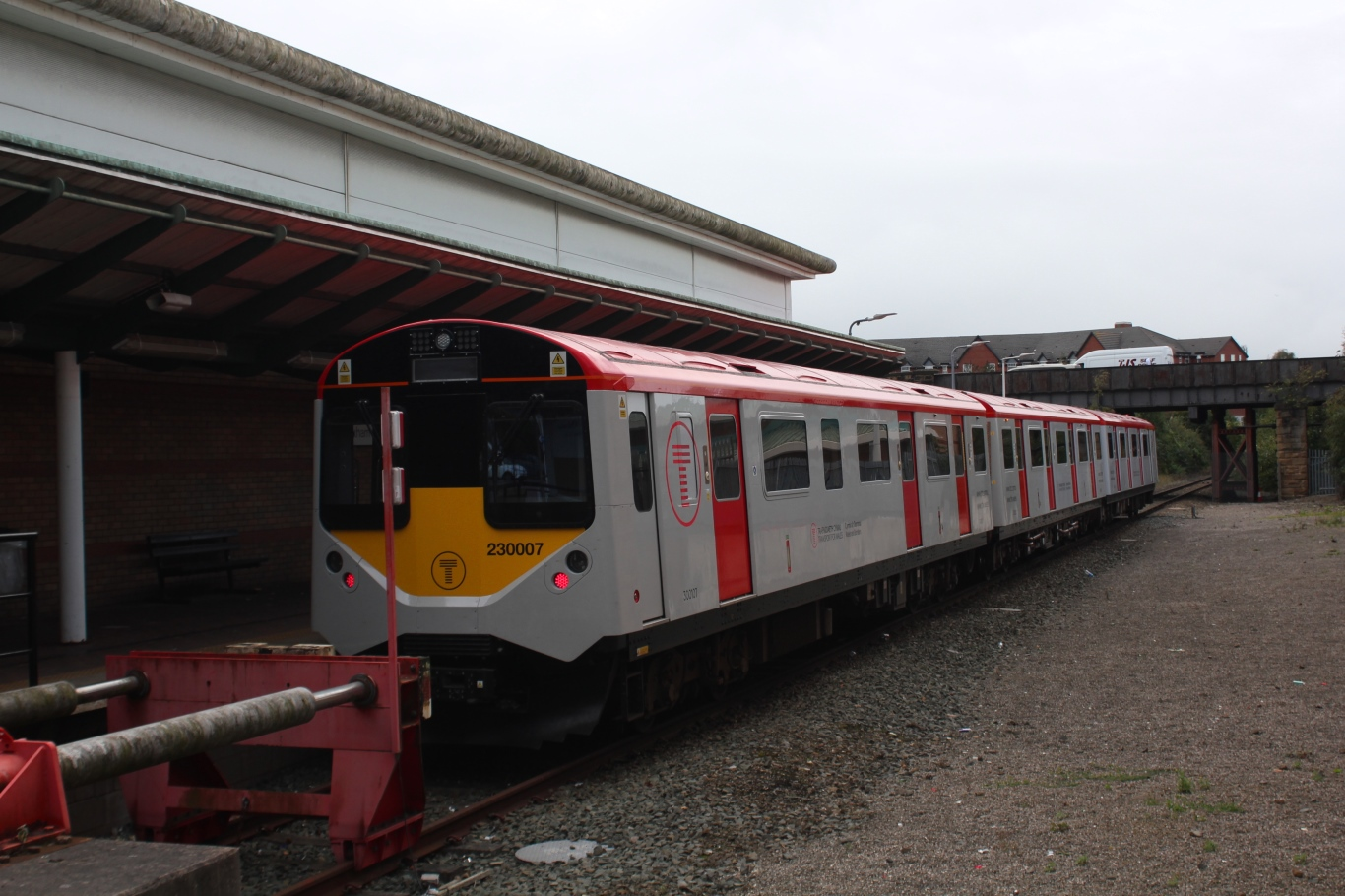
TfW Rail Class 230 at Wrexham Central

Five Class 230 D-Train diesel-battery electric multiple units were built in England from former London Underground D78 Stock aluminium bodyshells by start-up rolling stock manufacturer Vivarail between 2019 and 2020. Originally expected to enter service from May 2022, they began operations on the Borderlands line at the beginning of April 2023.

===== Class 756/231 FLIRT and Class 398 Citylink =====
A total of 35 Stadler FLIRT units have been ordered (consisting of 24 Class 756 tri-modes – 7 three-car and 17 four-car units – and 11 Class 231 diesel-electrics), along with 36 Class 398 Citylink tram-trains. These units will be manufactured at Stadler's factory in Szolnok, Hungary, and assembled at their plant in Bussnang, Switzerland. The Class 398 tram-trains are particularly unusual, being able to operate on both heavy rail and at street-level; accordingly, each three-car unit features level boarding and has a maximum passenger capacity of 256. In March 2023, the first of these tram-trains was delivered; testing commenced nine months later. In November 2024, the first of the Class 756 tri-mode trains entered service on the Merthyr Tydfil and Aberdare lines. The first of the Class 398 tram-trains entered service on 23 June 2026.

=== Past fleet ===
On 29 May 2021, TfW Rail permanently withdrew its fleet of Class 143 Pacers, which were not compliant with persons with reduced mobility legislation (PRM) and their PRM dispensation expired; their duties were taken over by PRM-compliant vehicles.

Between September 2021 and November 2022, all of TfW Rail's two-car Class 170 sets were transferred to East Midlands Railway. Operation of the three-car Class 170 continued through to spring 2023, at which point the last of TfW Rail's three-car units was transferred to the East Midlands. The final '170' transferred on 29 January 2024.

In May 2022, Transport for Wales announced the abrupt withdrawal of two Class 150 trains from service after they were involved with a collision at Craven Arms. In May 2023, Transport for Wales withdrew the last of its Class 769 fleet from service. In February 2023, the first of the Class 175 sets was withdrawn from service partially as a result of multiple fires. The entire Class 175 fleet was withdrawn on 17 October 2023.

Family	Class	Image	Type	Top speed		Number	Carriages	Routes operated	Withdrawn	Built	Notes
Family	Class	Image	Type	mph	km/h	Number	Carriages	Routes operated	Withdrawn	Built	Notes
	Diesel multiple unit										
Pacer	143		DMU	75	121	15	2	Valley Lines & Cardiff local routes	2021	1985–1986	Preserved or scrapped
Sprinter	150		DMU	75	120	5	2	Valley Lines & Cardiff local routes; Heart of Wales/West Wales lines; Regional services between south and west Wales, north-west England and south-west England	2022–2024	1987	Stored or scrapped
Bombardier Turbostar	170		DMU	100	161	4	2	Maesteg Line; Ebbw Valley Railway; South Wales Main Line	2021–2024	1999–2002	Transferred to East Midlands Railway
Bombardier Turbostar	170		DMU	100	161	8	3	Maesteg Line; Ebbw Valley Railway; South Wales Main Line	2021–2024	1999–2002	Transferred to East Midlands Railway
Alstom Coradia	175 Coradia 1000		DMU	100	161	11	2	Regional services between North, South and West Wales and England	2023	1999–2001	Stored, unit 175008 converted to 1 car, by donating a driving vehicle to unit 175101
Alstom Coradia	175 Coradia 1000		DMU	100	161	16	3	Regional services between North, South and West Wales and England	2023	1999–2001	Stored, unit 175008 converted to 1 car, by donating a driving vehicle to unit 175101
BR Second Generation (Mark 3)	769 Flex		BMU	100	161	8	4	Valley Lines (Rhymney line and southwards to Penarth via Vale of Glamorgan Line)	2023	2019–2020 (Note: Class 319/4 units were initially built between 1987 and 1988)	Stored

Preceded by KeolisAmey Wales (t/a Transport for Wales Rail Services)	Operator of Wales & Borders franchise 2021–present	Incumbent
