= Barry Dock Offices =

Council building in Barry, Vale of Glamorgan, Wales

Coordinates: 51.4012°N 3.2632°W

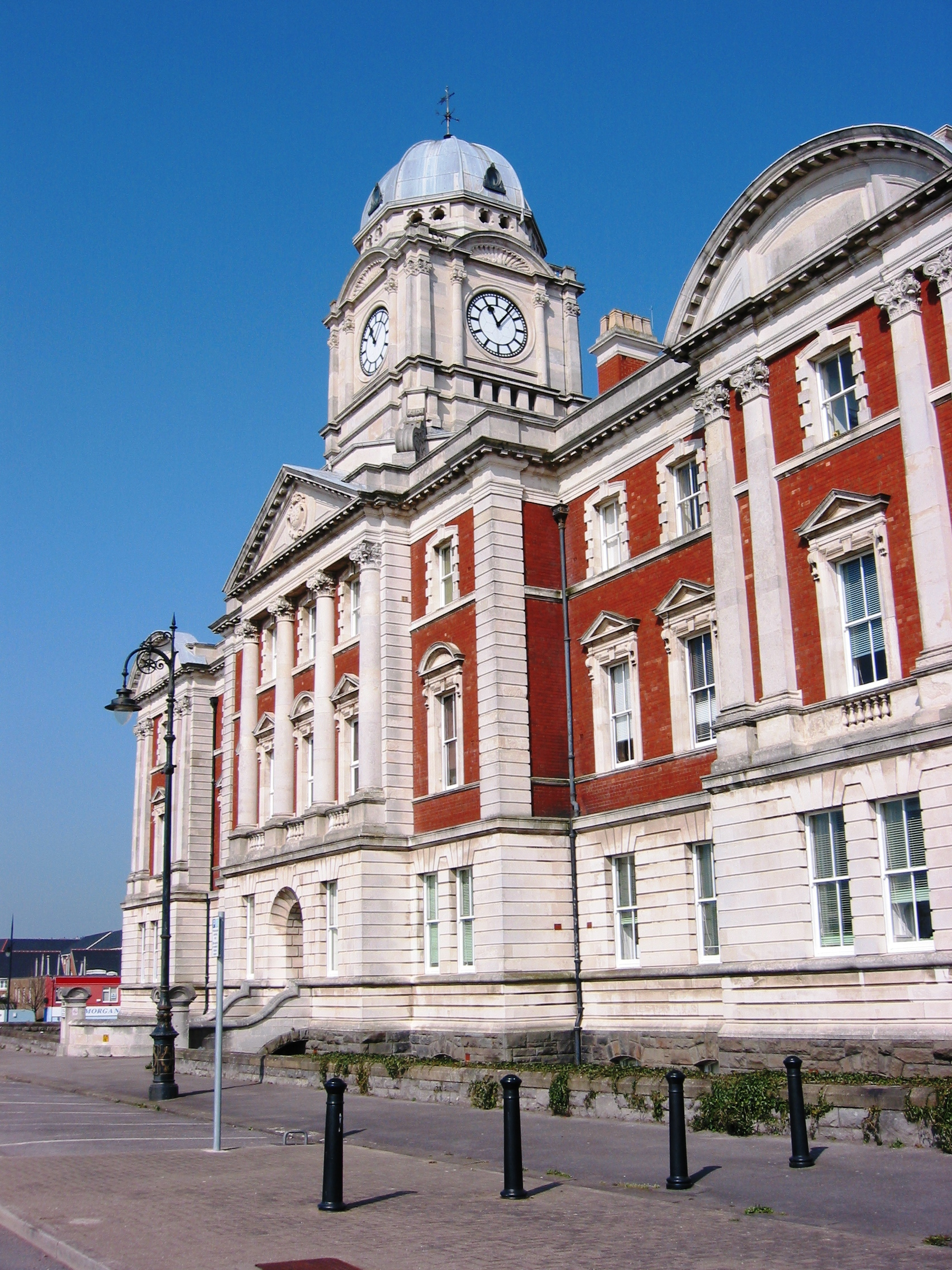
Barry Dock Offices in June 2007

Barry Docks Offices is a council building in Barry, Vale of Glamorgan in south-east Wales. It is prominently sited, overlooking the docks to the south, below the town and on a level site near Castleland Point, a promontory within Dock View Road. Barry Docks railway station is adjacent to the building and to its rear.

== History and architecture ==
The offices were constructed between 1897 and 1900 and bear the date 1898. The development was part of the industrialist David Davies's scheme for Barry Docks and was intended to regulate the substantial coal exporting trade which had grown to world prominence in the town.

The building cost £59,000. and is constructed of red brick with Portland stone dressing. The architect was Arthur E. Bell who was the son of the resident engineer of the Barry Dock and Railway Company. The building is in Baroque revival style, based on the work of Sir Christopher Wren. The building is a massive block, eleven bays by seven, with giant pilasters of the composite order above the ground floor, slightly projecting their bay centre, with a triangular pediment above on paired pilasters. The central tower consists of a clock tower with a cupola above. The design of the central doorway in a concave surround, imitates Wren's design for St Mary-le-Bow.

The Dock Offices were badly damaged by fire in 1984 but were later restored by Associated British Ports and now house the part of Vale of Glamorgan Council dealing with building construction and new civil engineering projects. The statue of David Davies, the man responsible for the building of the docks, stands in front of the offices. It is a Grade II* listed building.

== Gallery ==
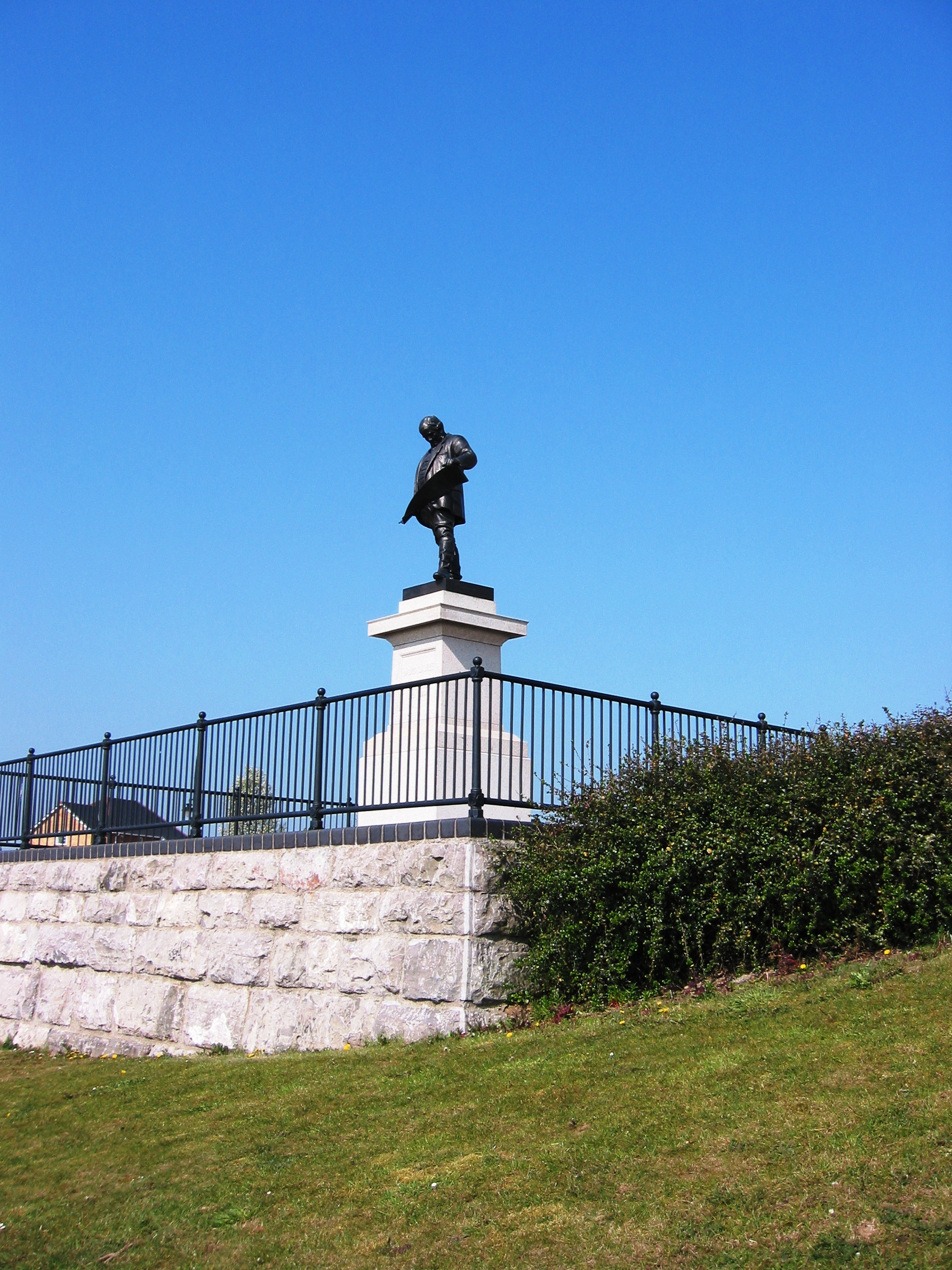
David Davies statue outside Barry Dock Offices

Barry Dock Offices (June 2010)
