= Barry Docks railway station =

Railway station in the Vale of Glamorgan, Wales

Barry Docks Welsh: Dociau'r Barri
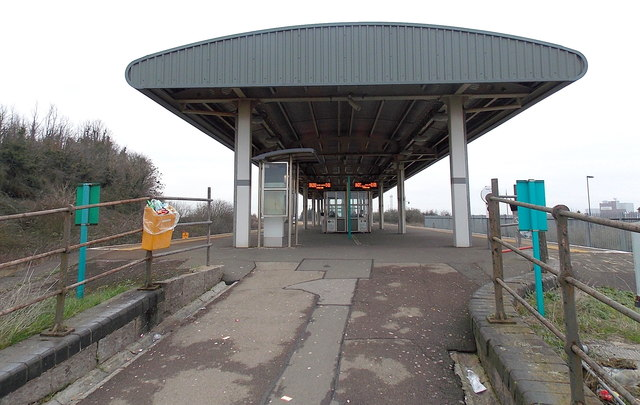

General information
- Location: Barry, Vale of Glamorgan; Wales
- Coordinates: 51°24′09″N 3°15′41″W
- Grid reference: ST123677
- Managed by: Transport for Wales
- Platforms: 2

Other information
- Station code: BYD
- Classification: DfT category F2

History
- Opened: 20 December 1888

Passengers
- 2020/21: ▼53,694
- 2021/22: ▲0.170 million
- 2022/23: ▲0.220 million
- 2023/24: ▲0.248 million
- 2024/25: ▲0.286 million
Location
Notes
- Passenger statistics from the Office of Rail and Road

Barry Docks Railway Station is one of four railway stations serving the town of Barry, South Wales. Rail passenger services are operated by Transport for Wales as part of the Valley Lines network.

More centrally located to Barry town centre, than Barry station, it is located on the Cardiff Central - Barry Island branch, 7 miles (11 km) south of Cardiff Central and just over 1 mile (1.6 km) north of Barry station and junction for the Vale of Glamorgan branch to Bridgend via Rhoose Cardiff International Airport station and Llantwit Major station.

== History ==
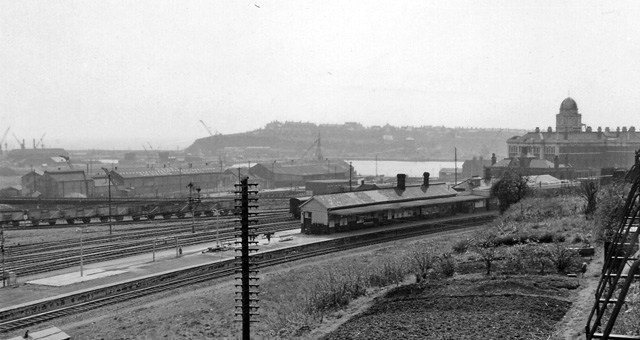
The station in 1962

It was built after the Barry Railway Company was incorporated by an act of Parliament, the Barry Dock and Railways Act 1884 (47 & 48 Vict. c. cclvii), on 14 August 1884, for the construction of the Barry Docks.

The company also ran Paddle Steamers from Barry Pier 2.5 miles (4.0 km) rail miles beyond, to places across the Bristol Channel, but eventually sold out to the Bristol company of P & A Campbell.

== Services ==
=== Rail ===
Monday to Saturday daytimes there is a 15-minute frequency northbound to Cardiff Central and beyond (alternately to Merthyr Tydfil & Aberdare). Southbound, there are 3 trains per hour to Barry Island and an hourly service to Bridgend via Rhoose. Eastbound services connect at Cardiff Central for other valley lines, e.g. to Rhymney, Treherbert and Ebbw Vale town, the City Line trains that run between Radyr and Coryton, as well as the South Wales main line eastbound. The westbound Vale of Glamorgan branch gives a connection at Bridgend to the South Wales main line towards Swansea and to the Llynfi branch to Maesteg.

On evenings and Sundays there is a generally a half-hourly service to Cardiff Central. Evenings there is an hourly service southbound to Barry Island and Bridgend whilst on Sundays half-hourly to Barry Island and every two hours to Bridgend.

Preceding station	National Rail	Following station
Cadoxton	Transport for Wales; Vale Line	Barry

=== Bus ===
The Barry Dock Interchange adjacent to the station was constructed in part of the car park for the Barry Dock Offices. It was completed in Summer 2023 following an investment of £3 million. In November 2023, it was announced that Adventure Travel would operate the B3 service from the Interchange, starting from 8 January. Adventure Travel also runs the 88 to Penarth, which also serves the interchange on weekdays and Saturdays.
