= British Rail Class 231 =

Diesel-electric multiple-unit passenger train

British Rail Class 231 FLIRT
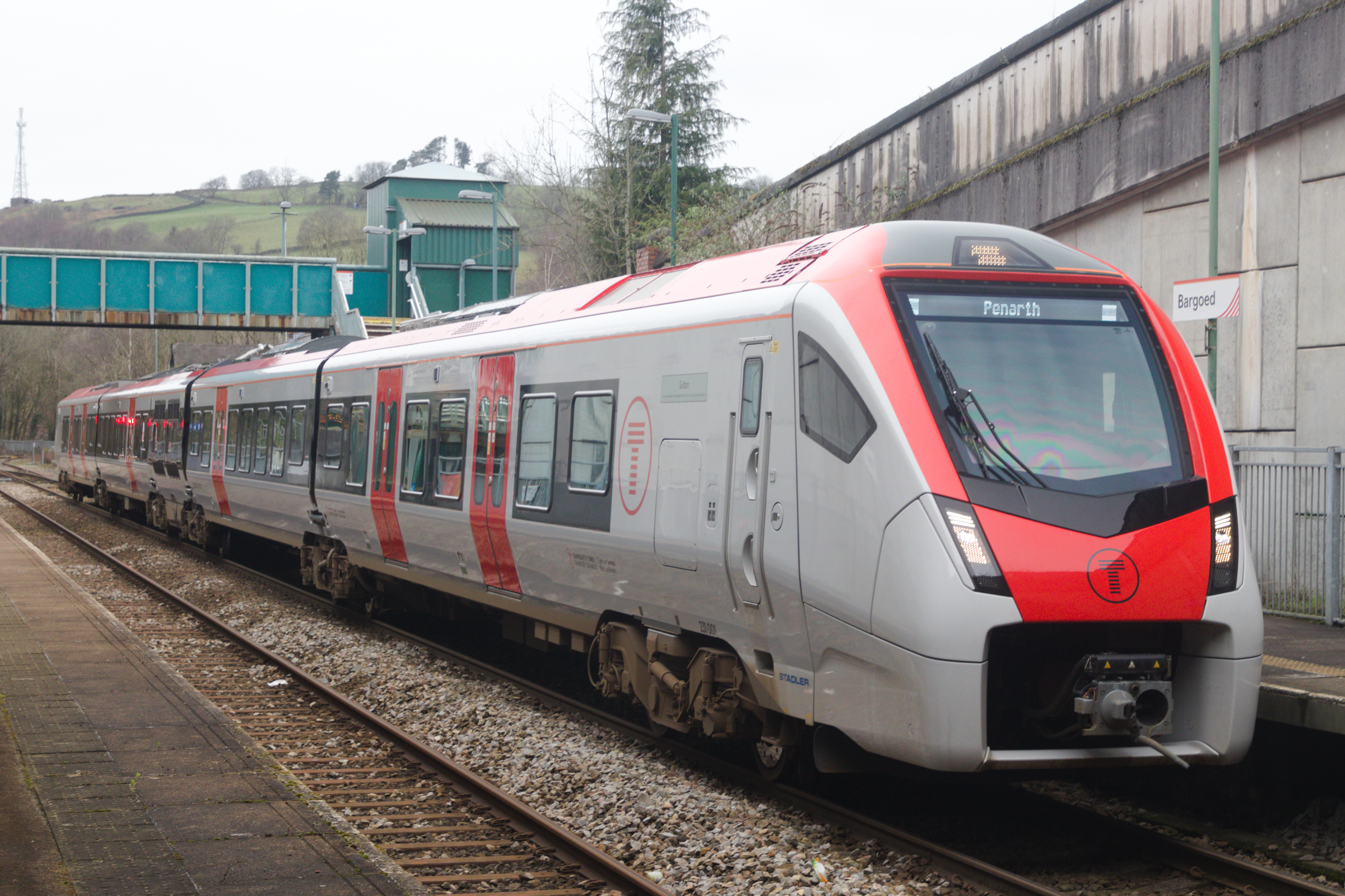
- Class 231 at Bargoed in 2024

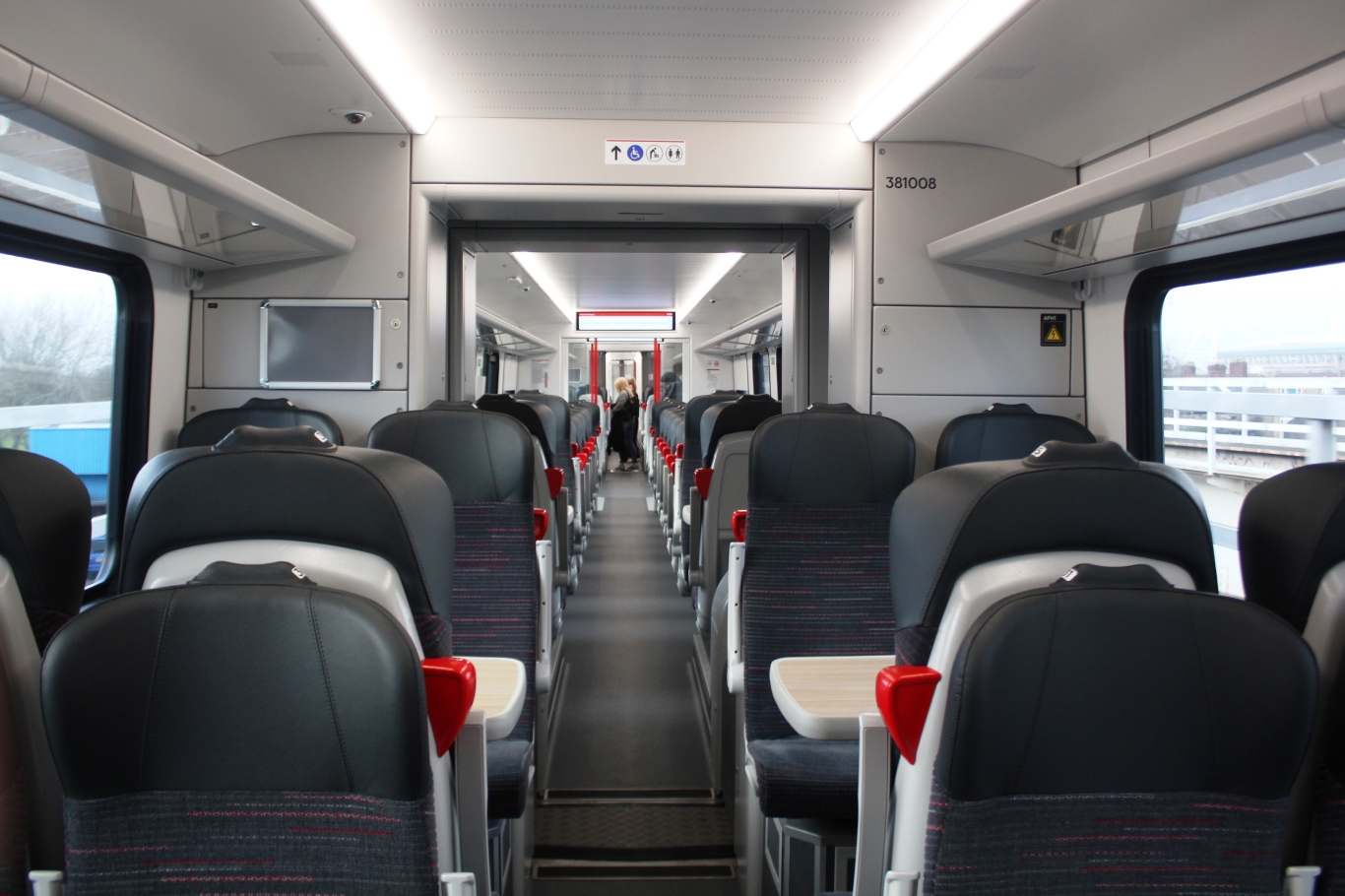
- Class 231 interior
- In service: 18 January 2023 – present
- Manufacturer: Stadler Rail
- Assembly: Stadler Bussnang AG
- Built at: Szolnok, Hungary (bodyshells); Bussnang, Switzerland (final assembly)
- Family name: FLIRT
- Replaced: Class 170; Class 769; Class 153; Class 150
- Constructed: 2021–2022
- Number built: 11
- Number in service: 11
- Formation: 4 cars per unit: (Note: The Power Pack is technically a fifth vehicle, but as it contains no passenger accommodation it is excluded from the count of passenger cars.); DMS-TS-PP-TSW-DMS
- Fleet numbers: 231001–231011
- Capacity: 170 seats, plus 36 tip-up & 180 standees
- Owners: SMBC Leasing and Equitix
- Operator: Transport for Wales Rail
- Depot: Canton (Cardiff)

Specifications
- Car body construction: Aluminium
- Train length: 80.7 m (264 ft 9 in)
- Width: Passenger vehicles: 2.720 m (8 ft 11.1 in); Power Pack: 2.822 m (9 ft 3.1 in)
- Height: 3.915 m (12 ft 10.1 in)
- Floor height: 960 mm (3 ft 2 in)
- Doors: Double-leaf sliding plug, each 1.300 m (4 ft 3.2 in) wide (total 6 per side)
- Wheel diameter: Powered: 870 mm (34 in); Unpowered: 760 mm (30 in)
- Wheelbase: Bogies: 2.700 m (8 ft 10.3 in)
- Maximum speed: 90 mph (145 km/h)
- Weight: 154.3 tonnes (151.9 long tons; 170.1 short tons) (4-car set)
- Traction system: IGBT
- Prime mover: 4 × Deutz 16-litre V8 turbo-diesel
- Power output: 1,500 kW (2,000 hp) at wheel
- Tractive effort: Starting: 160 kN (36,000 lbf)
- Acceleration: 0.9 m/s^{2} (2.0 mph/s)
- UIC classification: Bo′2′2′2′2′Bo′
- Safety systems: AWS; TPWS; (plus provision for ETCS)
- Multiple working: Within class (max. 3 units)
- Track gauge: 4 ft 8 1/2 in (1,435 mm) standard gauge

Notes/references
- Sourced from unless otherwise noted.

The British Rail Class 231 is a class of eleven diesel-electric multiple units of the FLIRT family, which were built for Transport for Wales by Swiss rolling stock manufacturer Stadler Rail. The first units entered service on 18 January 2023. The entire class is due to be converted into bi-mode multiple units.

== History ==
The previous Wales & Borders rail franchise operator, KeolisAmey Wales ordered the new trains. Although KeolisAmey was removed as the franchise operator and replaced by an operator of last resort Transport for Wales Rail, owned by the Welsh Government, the scheduled full fleet replacement continued.

The units began testing in Switzerland in July 2021 and in November 2021 the first two units were delivered to Cardiff Canton depot.

== Operators ==
=== Transport for Wales ===
The Class 231 units are currently used for services on the Rhymney line and the Vale of Glamorgan Line. They mostly operate between Rhymney/Bargoed and Barry Island from Mondays to Saturdays, and between Rhymney/Caerphilly and Barry Island on Sundays.

Sometimes they operate on other valleys lines as well such as the Merthyr/Aberdare Lines, the City Line and the Treherbert Line.

It is expected that they will operate the following services from around late 2025 or early 2026:

- Maesteg to/from Ebbw Vale Town via Cardiff
- Newport to/from Ebbw Vale Town
- Cardiff Central to/from Cheltenham Spa.

The official revenue launch of the Class 231 took place on 29 March 2023 at Caerphilly.

== Technical details ==
Class 231 units have four passenger vehicles, along with a separate "Power Pack" vehicle at the centre of the unit that contains four diesel generator sets. The diesel generators comply with EU Stage V emissions regulations. All vehicles are linked by unpowered Jacobs bogies, while the outermost bogie at each end of each unit carries the traction motors.

From October 2024, TfW were considering fitting pantographs to these units to allow them to operate as "hybrid" or "bi-mode" (like Class 755s), and had mobilised a project team to support the implementation of the conversion with Stadler. These plans were confirmed in June 2026.

== Fleet details ==
Subclass	Operator	Qty.	Year built	Passenger cars	Unit nos.
231/0	Transport for Wales Rail	11	2021–2022	4	231001–231011

=== Illustration ===
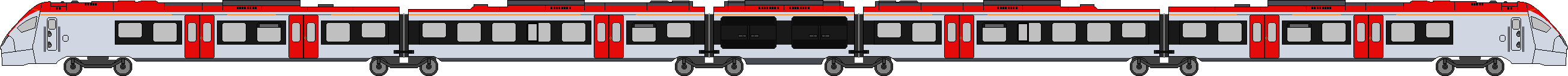
Side-profile illustration of a Class 231 unit (based on concept art)

=== Named units ===
- Unit 231001 is named Sultan. It was suggested by a local school as part of a competition run by TfW, and is named after a statue at Ystrad Mynach of the pit ponies used in the local coal mines.
- Unit 231005 is named Gavin & Stacey. It was suggested by a local primary school that participated in the Christmas Event at Barry Island which is part of the final episode of Gavin and Stacey.

== See also ==
- British Rail Class 745 - An electric multiple unit variant of the Stadler FLIRT UK platform built for Greater Anglia.
- British Rail Class 755 - A bi-mode multiple unit variant of the Stadler FLIRT UK platform built for Greater Anglia.
- British Rail Class 756 - A tri-mode multiple unit variant of the Stadler FLIRT UK platform also built for Transport for Wales Rail.
