= Vale of Glamorgan Line =

Commuter rail line in Wales

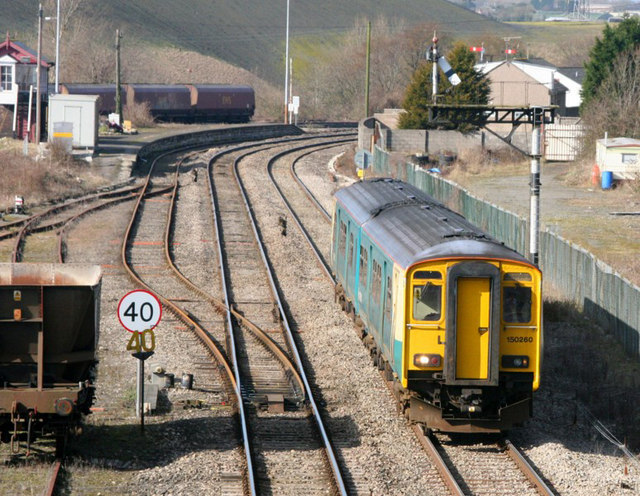
- A Cardiff-bound Arriva Trains Wales Class 150 passing through Aberthaw station, which closed in 1964

Overview
- Owner: Network Rail
- Locale: Cardiff; Bridgend County Borough; Vale of Glamorgan
- Termini: Cardiff Central; Penarth; Barry Island; Bridgend

Service
- Type: Heavy rail
- Operator(s): Transport for Wales
- Rolling stock: Class 150 DMUs; Class 153; Class 231

Technical
- Line length: Cardiff–Bridgend: 27 miles 36 chains (44.2 km); Penarth branch: 1 mile 11 chains (1.8 km); Barry–Barry Island: 54 chains (1,100 m); Total: 29 miles 21 chains (47.1 km)
- Number of tracks: Double-track, except: Bridgend to Bridgend Barry Junction; Barry South Junction to Barry Island; Cogan Junction to Penarth
- Track gauge: 1,435 mm (4 ft 8 1/2 in) standard gauge
Route map
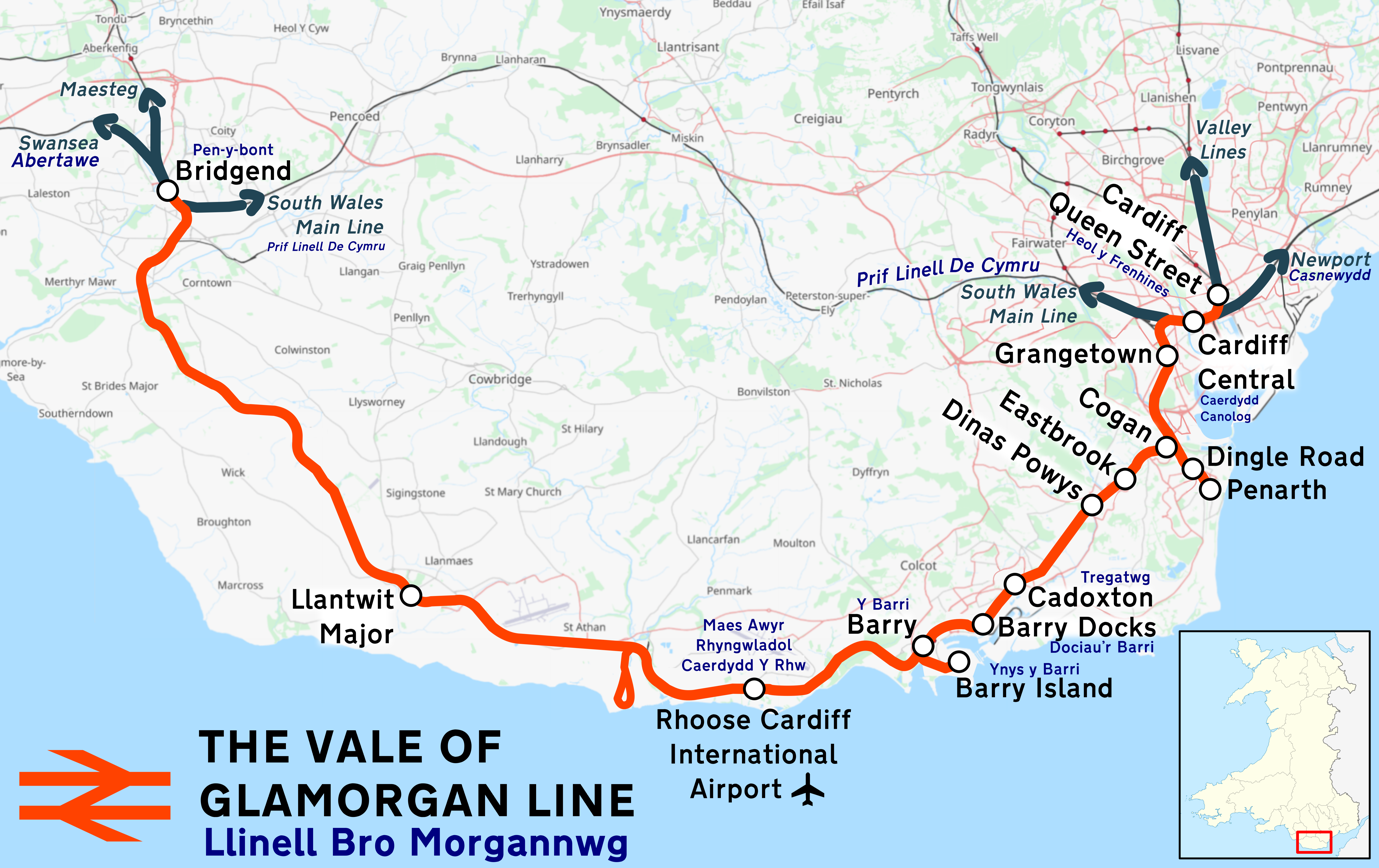
(Click to expand)

The Vale of Glamorgan Line (Welsh: Llinell Bro Morgannwg) is a commuter railway line in Wales, running through the Vale of Glamorgan from Barry to Bridgend, via Rhoose and Llantwit Major.

== Route ==
The Barry branch starts at Cardiff West and runs to Barry Island with a single line branch from Cogan Junction to Penarth. In June 1964, the Vale of Glamorgan line between Barry and Bridgend was closed to passengers by the Beeching Axe, as set out in the report 'The Reshaping of Britain's Railways', but after 41 years, in June 2005, it was reopened to passengers with two new stations at Llantwit Major and Rhoose, and the disused bay platform (now '1A') at Bridgend was reinstated to act as a terminus for the Vale Line. The line itself had been retained for freight traffic to/from the Ford Factory in Bridgend, and to Aberthaw Power Station, as well as to provide a detour for main line trains when the direct Bridgend to Cardiff line was closed.

Network Rail's mileage from Barry Junction zero to Bridgend is 19. Geographically, the Vale of Glamorgan Branch starts at Barry Junction and terminates at Bridgend station. The Barry branch (sic) runs into Vale of Glamorgan territory at the River Ely viaduct 1½ rail miles from the Cardiff West zero. The Penarth branch runs from Cogan Junction to Penarth town, the branch having been closed beyond Penarth to Cadoxton via Biglis Junction in 1968. Following the dramatic rationalisation that was to come about on South Wales railways after the 1960s, a large station board at Barry had announced "Change here for the Vale of Glamorgan Line." No such sign now exists but passengers must be made aware that if they board a Bridgend train at Cardiff, wishing to get to Barry Island, they must change trains at Barry station. Thus if boarding a Barry Island train at Cardiff and wishing to travel to Rhoose (for Cardiff International Airport), Llantwit Major or Bridgend, they must change at Barry station.

== History ==
Originally owned by the Vale of Glamorgan Railway Company and running between Coity Junction, north of Bridgend in the Llynfi valley and to the west of Barry, all traffic over it was operated by the Barry Railway Company, and the line opened from 1885. The whole of the Barry Railway, including Barry Docks, the Vale of Glamorgan branch, the Cadoxton-Trehafod branch and the Cardiff-Barry Island branch (Currently the Barry branch) became a constituent part of the Great Western Railway in 1923, after the railway grouping. Local traffic on the Vale of Glamorgan branch included that from the limestone quarries and the cement works at Aberthaw and Rhoose at the eastern end of the line. Wartime traffic was created from Tremains and Brackla Hill at Bridgend and the RAF base at St. Athan. More recent developments were the opening of the Aberthaw power stations (Aberthaw "A" in October 1963 (official opening date) and Aberthaw "B" station in 1971) and the Ford engine plant at Bridgend in January 1980. Aberthaw "B" power station was closed in 1995 and demolished by 1998. The Vale of Glamorgan Barry-Bridgend passenger service finished on Saturday 15 June 1964 as part of the Beeching cuts, but passenger trains on the eastern part of the Barry Branch from Cardiff-Barry-Barry Island continued, and the western section continued to be used by through passenger trains between Cardiff and Bridgend when the main line via Pontyclun is closed. This still frequently happens at night or on Sundays and train operators can run freight traffic via this route to retain train crew route knowledge or to avoid delays on the main South Wales line. Due to public demand, the line was successfully reopened to passengers as from 10 June 2005.

From the late 1990s, some trains run between Ford’s plants at Dagenham and Bridgend and merry-go-round coal trains run between Onllwyn and Cwmgwrach (to the west), Tower Colliery (Finished February 2017), Ffos-y-Frân (Merthyr Tydfil), Newport Docks and Avonmouth (to the east), to Aberthaw "B" power station, averaging some 10 trains a day.(These workings were considerably modified by 2016 and the Vale of Neath line to Cwmgwrach was in mothball from N&B Junction, Neath). However, in August 2019, the last merry-go-round coal delivery had been run to Aberthaw "B" power station and the station is to be closed in the spring of 2020. It had also been announced that Ford's Waterton plant is to close in 2020. Rhoose cement works closed by 1987 and has been demolished but a connection is retained to CRH Tarmac's (LaFarge) Aberthaw cement works where wagons had been stored occasionally but after sporadic use, three cement trains per week were started to Westbury and Moorswater from December 2016. Cement tank rail traffic continues in November 2019. There remains a mainline station connection with the heritage operation of the Barry Tourist Railway at Barry Island railway station.

== Reopening to passengers ==
A pressure group called Railfuture produced a booklet "Rails to the Vale" in 1997 in which it was stated that they believe: that a new daily passenger service through the vale could cover its costs – and even generate profits given time

With traffic increasing to Cardiff International Airport, the Local Government transport consortium SWIFT also identified the potential for reopening the Vale of Glamorgan line. The scheme was promoted by the Vale of Glamorgan and Bridgend Borough Councils to the Welsh Assembly Government in August 1999. After agreeing funding, track upgrading and signalling works commenced in June 2004 with: 3.5 miles (5.6 km) of new track laid; 6.5 miles (10.5 km) of track upgraded; 15000 tonnes of ballast used; three new section signals (2 on the up and 1 on the down) were installed together with three distant signals and one repeater signal required by the curved approach to Llantwit Major Station. Final planning permission for the new stations and interchanges at Rhoose, Cardiff International Airport and Llantwit Major was granted in 2004 and from October 2004 the line was closed daily between Bridgend and Aberthaw or Barry for the station construction, with goods traffic passing at night. At Bridgend, the Barry bay was relaid and a new platform face built. Network Rail used three contractors: Mowlem for the permanent way; Carillion for signals and telephones; and Galliford Try for civil engineering, including the platforms. The Vale of Glamorgan Council was responsible for the construction of the interchanges at Rhoose, Cardiff International Airport and Llantwit Major. Network Rail spent £15m and the Vale of Glamorgan Council £2m making a grand total of £17m for the whole project. The daytime closures were shortened from April to enable crew training to commence.

The official opening was performed by Andrew Davies AM, Welsh Assembly Government Minister for Economic Development and Transport, on 10 June 2005. The section of line between Barry and Bridgend reopened for passenger services on 12 June, the first day of that year's Summer timetable, with a pair of Class 143s (143606 and 143624) working 0841 Cardiff-Bridgend via Llantwit Major and 0942 return Bridgend-Cardiff via Llantwit Major. Arriva Trains Wales then ran a number of loco-hauled special services in conjunction with the Barry (waterfront) transport festival.

== Operations ==
The Barry (BRY), Penarth (PTH) and Vale of Glamorgan (VOG) branches are currently operated by Transport for Wales (TfW) as part of the Valley Lines network. TfW replaced the previous franchise, Arriva Trains Wales, in October 2018.

The city, towns and villages served by the stations on the line are listed below.

- Cardiff Central
  - Connections with South Wales Main Line and Valley Lines
- Grangetown
  - Branch line diverges as a single line from Cogan Junction to Penarth
- Cogan
- Eastbrook
- Dinas Powys
- Cadoxton
- Barry Docks
- Barry
  - Barry Branch line diverges as a single line to Barry Island
- Rhoose for Cardiff International Airport
- Llantwit Major
- Bridgend
  - Connections with South Wales Main Line (London to Swansea) and Maesteg Line

== Electrification of the line ==
On 16 July 2012 plans to electrify the line were announced by the Government as part of a £9.4bn package of investment of the railways in England and Wales.

The announcement was made as an extension of the electrification of the South Wales Main Line from Cardiff to Swansea and the electrification of the south Wales Valley Lines at a total cost of £350 million. The investment will require new trains and should result in reduced journeys times and a cheaper to maintain network. Work was expected to start between 2014 and 2019, but was then pushed back to between 2019 and 2024.

As part of Welsh Government's South Wales Metro, this line has seen the Class 231 running to Barry Island, with the Class 756 rolling stock planned to be introduced in 2026. Following this, the Class 231s will replace remaining Class 150s still running to Bridgend.

In the Rail Vision Report released by Western Gateway in February 2025 the electrification of the Vale of Glamorgan Line is still scheduled to take place with the report indicating that a new OBC (outline business case) will have to be created as the scope of the electrification released in the 2012 OBC was for the entirety of the Vale of Glamorgan line but the scheme has now been shortened to the electrification of the line only up until Barry railway station.

== See also ==
- List of railway stations in Cardiff
