= Rail transport in Cardiff =

Railway network centred on Cardiff, Wales

Coordinates: 51.4760°N 3.1800°W

Cardiff is connected by rail to many other major cities in the United Kingdom. The city and its commuter towns in southeast Wales have an urban rail network. Today, there are three train operating companies in Cardiff: Great Western Railway, CrossCountry and Transport for Wales.

== Services to/from Cardiff ==
=== Transport for Wales ===
National

- Cardiff Central – Newport – Hereford – Shrewsbury – Wrexham General – Chester – Rhyl – Llandudno Junction – Holyhead
- Cardiff Central – Newport – Hereford – Shrewsbury – Crewe – Manchester Piccadilly
- Cardiff Central – Bridgend – Port Talbot Parkway – Neath – Swansea – Llanelli – Carmarthen – Milford Haven
- Cardiff Central – Newport – Gloucester – Cheltenham Spa

Regional

- Cardiff Central – Bridgend – Port Talbot Parkway – Neath – Swansea
- Cardiff Central – Rogerstone – Risca and Pontymister – Ebbw Vale Parkway

Local

These services operate on the Valley Lines network – an urban rail network centred on Cardiff that connects it to its commuter towns in South East Wales:

- Cardiff Central – Cardiff Queen Street – Rhiwbina – Coryton
- Cardiff Central – Ninian Park – Fairwater – Radyr
- Cardiff Central – Grangetown – Penarth
- Cardiff Central – Grangetown – Dinas Powys – Barry – Barry Island
- Cardiff Central – Grangetown – Dinas Powys – Barry – Rhoose Cardiff International Airport – Llantwit Major – Bridgend
- Cardiff Queen Street – Cardiff Bay
- Cardiff Central – Pontyclun – Bridgend – Maesteg
- Cardiff Central – Cardiff Queen Street – Caerphilly – Ystrad Mynach – Bargoed – Rhymney
- Cardiff Central – Cardiff Queen Street – Radyr – Pontypridd – Abercynon – Merthyr Tydfil
- Cardiff Central – Cardiff Queen Street – Radyr – Pontypridd – Abercynon – Mountain Ash – Aberdare
- Cardiff Central – Cardiff Queen Street – Radyr – Pontypridd – Tonypandy – Treorchy – Treherbert

=== Great Western Railway ===
National

- Cardiff Central – Newport – Bristol Parkway – Swindon – Reading – London Paddington
- Cardiff Central – Bristol Temple Meads – Bath Spa – Southampton Central – Portsmouth Harbour
- Cardiff Central – Bristol Temple Meads – Weston-super-Mare – Taunton

Regional

- Cardiff Central – Newport – Filton Abbey Wood – Bristol Temple Meads
- Cardiff Central – Bridgend – Port Talbot Parkway – Neath – Swansea
  - Daily/Summer Weekend extensions to Carmarthen and Pembroke Dock respectively

=== CrossCountry ===
National

- Cardiff Central – Newport – Gloucester – Birmingham New Street – Derby – Nottingham

== Stations in Cardiff ==
All 20 railway stations in Cardiff are owned by Network Rail and managed by Transport for Wales which also operates all train services at these stations, with the exception of Cardiff Central which is also served by CrossCountry and Great Western Railway. The stations form part of Cardiff's commuter rail network, colloquially known as the Valley Lines.

Cardiff Central and Cardiff Queen Street are the main hubs of the city and are the two busiest stations in Wales.

Cardiff Central is one of the United Kingdom's major railway stations, providing connections to Newport, Bristol, Bath, Reading, London, Southampton, Portsmouth, Gloucester, Cheltenham, Birmingham and Nottingham. It is located in the south of the city centre.

Cardiff Queen Street is the hub of the Valley Lines network, with all lines running through the station. It is located in the east of the city centre.

Station	Area	Station Code	Platforms	13/14 Entry/Exit (millions)	Year opened	Lines	Image
Birchgrove; Llwynbedw	Birchgrove	BCG	1	0.034	1929	Coryton Line	
Cardiff Bay; Bae Caerdydd	Butetown; Cardiff Bay	CDB	2	1.019	1841	Butetown Branch Line	
Cardiff Central; Caerdydd Canolog	Cardiff city centre	CDF	8	11.74	1850	Cardiff City Line; Coryton Line, Ebbw Valley Railway; Maesteg Line, Merthyr Line; Rhondda Line; Rhymney Line; South Wales Main Line; Vale of Glamorgan Line	
Cardiff Queen Street; Caerdydd Heol Y Frenhines	Cardiff city centre Adamsdown	CDQ	5	2.463	1840	Butetown Line; Coryton Line; Merthyr Line; Rhondda Line; Rhymney Line	
Cathays; Cathays	Cathays; Cardiff University	CYS	2	0.807	1983	Merthyr Line; Rhondda Line	
Coryton; Coryton	Coryton; Pantmawr; Whitchurch	COY	1	0.266	1911	Coryton Line	
Danescourt; Danescourt	Danescourt; Llandaff North	DCT	2	0.086	1987	City Line	
Fairwater; Tyllgoed	Fairwater	FRW	2	0.051	1987	City Line	
Grangetown; Grangetown	Grangetown; Leckwith	GTN	2	0.180	1882	Vale of Glamorgan Line	
Heath High Level; Lefel Uchaf y Mynydd Bychan	Heath; Cyncoed	HHL	2	0.311	1915	Rhymney Line	
Heath Low Level; Lefel Isel y Mynydd Bychan	Heath; Cyncoed	HLL	1	0.054	1911	Coryton Line	
Lisvane and Thornhill; Llys-faen	Lisvane; Thornhill	LVT	2	0.176	1871	Rhymney Line	
Llandaf; Llandaf	Llandaff North; Gabalfa; Whitchurch	LLN	2	0.441	1840	Merthyr Line; Rhondda Line	
Llanishen; Llanishen	Llanishen	LLS	2	0.221	1871	Rhymney Line	
Ninian Park; Parc Ninian	Leckwith; Ninian Park; Canton	NNP	2	0.100	1987	City Line	
Radyr; Radyr	Radyr; Morganstown	RDR	3	0.469	1863	Merthyr Line; Rhondda Line; City Line	
Rhiwbina; Rhiwbina	Rhiwbina	RHI	1	0.046	1911	Coryton Line	
Ty Glas; Tŷ Glas	Llanishen; Heath	TGS	1	0.131	1987	Coryton Line	
Waun-Gron Park; Parc Waun-Gron	Fairwater; Canton	WNG	2	0.055	1987	City Line	
Whitchurch; Yr Eglwys Newydd	Whitchurch	WHT	1	0.011	1911	Coryton Line	

== Railway lines ==
The rail network within and around Cardiff

These are the main rail lines that serve Cardiff. Most of the lines are Cardiff commuter lines that form the city's urban rail network.

=== South Wales Main Line ===
The South Wales Main Line is a branch of the Great Western Main Line from London Paddington. It diverges from the main line near Swindon, first passing through Bristol Parkway and continuing through the Severn Tunnel to Cardiff Central via Newport. The line continues from the city towards West Wales. The line between London and Cardiff has been electrified.

=== Butetown Line ===
The Butetown Line is a short line running from Cardiff Queen Street to Cardiff Bay. Rail services call only at those stations with a frequency of every 12 minutes.

=== Cardiff City Line ===
The Cardiff City Line is entirely within Cardiff running to its western suburbs. The line terminates at Radyr, after calling at Ninian Park, Waun-Gron Park, Fairwater and Danescourt. Rail services run to Cardiff Central and Queen Street every 30 minutes, and usually continue on the Coryton Line.

=== Coryton Line ===
The Coryton Line is entirely within Cardiff running to its northern suburbs. The line terminates at Coryton, after calling at stations in Heath, Ty Glas, Birchgrove, Rhiwbina and Whitchurch. Rail services run to Cardiff Central and Queen Street every 30 minutes, and usually continue on the Radyr Line.

=== Ebbw Valley Railway ===
The Ebbw Valley Railway was re-opened to passenger rail services in February 2008. The line provides an hourly service between Cardiff Central and Ebbw Vale Town. The line follows the South Wales Main Line eastbound out of Cardiff before diverging north and calling at Rogerstone, Risca and Pontymister, Crosskeys, Newbridge, Llanhilleth and Ebbw Vale Parkway.

=== Maesteg Line ===
The Maesteg Line runs from Cardiff to Maesteg in Bridgend County Borough. The line follows the South Wales Main Line through the Vale of Glamorgan until Bridgend, calling at minor stations which are not served by high speed services. The line then diverges northwards through Sarn and Tondu. Services run every hour to and from Cardiff, often extending to Cheltenham Spa.

=== Merthyr Line ===
The Merthyr Line runs northward out of Cardiff, calling at stations in the suburbs of Cathays, Llandaff and Radyr, where it connects with the City Line. It continues into Rhondda Cynon Taff, through Taffs Well, Treforest and Pontypridd. Frequencies on this stretch of the line are usually every 10 minutes.

After calling at Abercynon, the line splits into two branches; one to Merthyr Tydfil via Merthyr Vale and another to Aberdare via Mountain Ash. Frequencies are every 30 minutes on both branches and often link up with Vale of Glamorgan Line services to Barry Island or Bridgend via Rhoose Cardiff International Airport.

=== Rhondda Line ===
The Rhondda Line is a line that runs north from Cardiff through the Rhondda Valley to Treherbert. The line is shared with the Merthyr Line until Pontypridd. From there, the line diverges through Porth, Tonypandy and Treorchy amongst others.

Services run every 30 minutes and often continue through Cardiff onto the Vale of Glamorgan Line to Penarth or Barry Island.

=== Rhymney Line ===
The Rhymney Line is another line that runs northwards from Cardiff and calls at stations in the city suburbs of Heath, Llanishen and Lisvane before continuing to Caerphilly and places such as Ystrad Mynach, Hengoed and Bargoed.

Services on this stretch of line run every 15 minutes. Every hour, trains continue on the rest of the line to Rhymney. Trains often continue through Cardiff onto the Vale of Glamorgan Line to Penarth.

=== Vale of Glamorgan Line ===
The Vale of Glamorgan Line is a line that runs from Cardiff through the largely rural county of the Vale of Glamorgan to Bridgend. The line comprises three branches. Trains call at Grangetown in Cardiff before continuing on the main line to stations in Dinas Powys and Barry, or diverging onto a branch serving Penarth. After Barry, services can either continue again to Rhoose Cardiff International Airport, Llantwit Major and Bridgend or diverge to Barry Island.

Frequencies to Penarth or to Barry Island are every 15 minutes, and to Bridgend via Cardiff Airport are every hour. Train services often continue after Cardiff Queen Street on the Merthyr, Rhondda or Rhymney Lines.

== Main destinations ==
There are direct services from Cardiff Central to the following destinations, with the average scheduled journey time:

National

Destination	Time from Central	Operator
Bath Spa	65 mins	Great Western Railway
Birmingham New Street	120 mins	CrossCountry
Bristol Parkway	41 mins	Great Western Railway
Bristol Temple Meads	48 mins	Great Western Railway
Derby	174 mins	CrossCountry
Gloucester	59 mins	CrossCountry; Transport for Wales
Holyhead	301 mins	Transport for Wales
London Paddington	100-110 mins	Great Western Railway
Manchester Piccadilly	205 mins	Transport for Wales
Milford Haven	160 mins	Transport for Wales
Nottingham	200 mins	CrossCountry
Portsmouth Harbour	211 mins	Great Western Railway
Shrewsbury	121 mins	Transport for Wales
Southampton Central	156 mins	Great Western Railway
Taunton	122 mins	Great Western Railway
Wrexham General	161 mins	Transport for Wales

Regional/Local

Destination	Time from Central	Operator
Aberdare	63 mins	Transport for Wales
Rhymney	60 mins	Transport for Wales
Barry	24 mins	Transport for Wales
Bridgend	22-59 mins	Great Western Railway; Transport for Wales
Coryton	19 mins	Transport for Wales
Ebbw Vale	56 mins	Transport for Wales
Maesteg	54 mins	Transport for Wales
Merthyr Tydfil	62 mins	Transport for Wales
Newport	13-15 mins	CrossCountry; Great Western Railway; Transport for Wales
Penarth	16 mins	Transport for Wales
Pontypridd	30 mins	Transport for Wales
Radyr	26 mins	Transport for Wales
Tredegar	84 mins	Transport for Wales
Treherbert	66 mins	Transport for Wales

== Train operators ==
Current train operators

Operator	Image	Stock operated	Route(s)
CrossCountry	CrossCountry	Class 170 Turbostar; Class 220 Voyager; Class 221 Voyager	Cardiff Central – Nottingham via Gloucester and Birmingham; Cardiff Central – Edinburgh via Birmingham and York
Great Western Railway	First Great Western	Class 800 IET; Class 158 Express Sprinter	London – Paddington via South Wales Main Line, Bristol Parkway and Reading; Cardiff Central – Portsmouth Harbour via Bristol Temple Meads, Bath, Salisbury and Southampton; Cardiff Central – Taunton via Bristol Temple Meads and Weston-Super-Mare
Transport for Wales	Transport for Wales	Class 67 and Mark 4 Class 158 Express Sprinter; Class 153 Super Sprinter; Class 150 Sprinter; Class 197; Class 231 FLIRT; Class 756 FLIRT	Cardiff Central – Holyhead via Shrewewsbury, Wrexham & Chester; West Wales – Manchester Piccadilly via Shrewewsbury & Crewe; Maesteg – Cheltenham Spa via Gloucester; South Wales Main Line to Swansea, Carmarthen, Tenby, Pembroke Dock, Milford Haven; Valley Lines; Cardiff Bay Line

Former train operators

Operator	Years	Image
Arriva Trains Wales	2003–2018	Arriva Trains Wales
Central Trains	1997–2007	Central Trains
Valley Lines	1995–2001	Valley Lines

Former train operators

Operator	Years	Image
Virgin CrossCountry	1997–2007	Virgin Trains
Wales & Borders	2001–2003	Wales & Borders
Wales & West	1997–2001	
Wessex Trains	2001–2006	Wessex Trains

== Transport connections ==
The Cardiff Waterbus towards Cardiff Bay stops at Taff Mead Embankment, near Central Station.

Taxi ranks are located outside Central Station, as is cycle parking which is also available at many other city stations.

Cardiff Airport connects with the Cardiff rail network at Rhoose Cardiff International Airport station, from which free shuttle buses run to the departures terminal.

== Future plans ==
The South Wales Metro System is a proposed major overhaul of the transport systems in South East Wales, including integration of heavy rail and development of light rail and bus-based public transport services around the hub of Cardiff Central.

The disused railway station in the St. Fagans area, in the west of the city, could be reopened to bolster transport links for a major Cardiff tourist attraction, under a proposal in March 2010 by former First Minister Rhodri Morgan AM and Cardiff West MP Kevin Brennan, follow predictions that visitor numbers to the National History Museum could top one million a year by 2017. By 2012, further submissions will be made to try to secure £8.7m of funding towards the project.

Network Rail is currently proposing adding an extra two platforms to both Cardiff Central and Cardiff Queen Street station, and installing a light rail metro system in the city.

== See also ==
- Transport in Cardiff
- Transport in Wales
