= List of railway stations in Cardiff =

This is a list of railway stations in Cardiff, the capital of Wales. It only includes passenger heavy rail stations with timetabled services.

== Rail operators ==
All 20 stations in Cardiff are owned by Network Rail and managed by Transport for Wales which also operates all train services at these stations, with the exception of Cardiff Central which is also served by CrossCountry and Great Western Railway.

== Stations ==
The stations form part of Cardiff's commuter rail network, colloquially known as Valley Lines, with Cardiff Queen Street and Cardiff Central being the main hubs of the city. Cardiff Central is also one of the United Kingdom's major railway stations, providing connections to Newport, Bristol, Bath, London, Southampton, Portsmouth, Gloucester, Cheltenham, Birmingham and Nottingham. Cardiff Central continues to serve as a major interchange on the British rail network, with 1,042,297 changes at the station in 08/09. Its passenger usage also increased by around 1.5 million to 11.3 million.

Station	Area	Station Code	Platforms	2013/14 Entry/Exit (thousands)	Year opened	Lines
Birchgrove; Llwynbedw	Birchgrove	BCG	1	34	1929	Coryton Line
Cardiff Bay; Bae Caerdydd	Butetown; Cardiff Bay	CDB	2	1,019	1841	Butetown Branch Line
Cardiff Central; Caerdydd Canolog	Cardiff city centre	CDF	8	11,740	1850	Cardiff City Line; Coryton Line; Ebbw Valley Railway; Maesteg Line; Merthyr Line; Rhondda Line; Rhymney Line; South Wales Main Line; Vale of Glamorgan Line
Cardiff Queen Street; Caerdydd Heol Y Frenhines	Cardiff city centre Adamsdown	CDQ	5	2,463	1840	Butetown Line; Coryton Line; Merthyr Line; Rhondda Line; Rhymney Line
Cathays; Cathays	Cathays; Cardiff University	CYS	2	807	1983	Merthyr Line; Rhondda Line
Coryton; Coryton	Coryton; Pantmawr; Whitchurch	COY	1	266	1911	Coryton Line
Danescourt; Danescourt	Danescourt; Llandaff North	DCT	2	86	1987	City Line
Fairwater; Tyllgoed	Fairwater	FRW	2	51	1987	City Line
Grangetown; Grangetown	Grangetown; Leckwith	GTN	2	180	1882	Vale of Glamorgan Line
Heath High Level; Lefel Uchaf y Mynydd Bychan	Heath; Cyncoed	HHL	2	311	1915	Rhymney Line
Heath Low Level; Lefel Isel y Mynydd Bychan	Heath; Cyncoed	HLL	1	54	1911	Coryton Line
Lisvane and Thornhill; Llys-faen	Lisvane; Thornhill	LVT	2	176	1871	Rhymney Line
Llandaf; Llandaf	Llandaff North; Whitchurch	LLN	2	441	1840	Merthyr Line; Rhondda Line
Llanishen; Llanishen	Llanishen	LLS	2	221	1871	Rhymney Line
Ninian Park; Parc Ninian	Leckwith; Ninian Park; Canton	NNP	2	100	1987	City Line
Radyr; Radyr	Radyr; Morganstown	RDR	3	469	1863	Merthyr Line; Rhondda Line; City Line
Rhiwbina; Rhiwbina	Rhiwbina	RHI	1	46	1911	Coryton Line
Ty Glas; Tŷ Glas	Llanishen; Heath	TGS	1	131	1987	Coryton Line
Waun-Gron Park; Parc Waun-Gron	Fairwater; Canton	WNG	2	55	1987	City Line
Whitchurch; Yr Eglwys Newydd	Whitchurch	WHT	1	11	1911	Coryton Line

== See also ==
- Commuter rail in the United Kingdom
- List of proposed railway stations in Wales - Cardiff area
- List of railway stations in Wales
- Transport in Cardiff
- Transport in Wales
