= Fairwater, Cardiff =

District and community in Cardiff, Wales

Coordinates: 51°29′24″N 3°14′36″W

Fairwater: Welsh: Y Tyllgoed
- Community
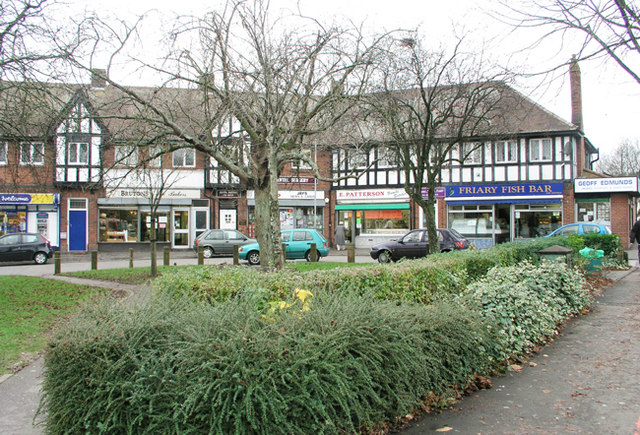
- Shopping area on Fairwater Green

- Location within Cardiff
- Principal area: Cardiff
- Country: Wales
- Sovereign state: United Kingdom
- Police: South Wales
- Fire: South Wales
- Ambulance: Welsh
- List of places UK Wales Cardiff Map of the community

Fairwater (Welsh: Y Tyllgoed) is a district and community in the west of Cardiff, capital of Wales. It is located a few miles from Culverhouse Cross which connects Cardiff to the M4 motorway. The population taken at the 2011 census was 12,981.

== Etymologies ==
The original Welsh name Tyllgoed derives from "tyll" meaning "to hole" or "to burrow" and "coed" meaning "woods" or "trees". Tyllgoed is a name common to a number of streams in Wales that burrow through woods and it is likely this name would have originally applied to the stream that still runs through Fairwater today.

The similarity of the first element to the Welsh word "tywyll" meaning "dark" led some later writers to derive the name as "dark woods". However, this derivation is now considered a folk etymology, especially given that the name is first recorded under the spellings Tull Coit and Tollcoit in the land of Ystrad Ager, in the 12th century Book of Llandaff. The entry states that the area was given to Llandaff Cathedral during the time of its fourteenth Bishop, Berthguin, in the early 8th century. The English name Fairwater may ultimately derive from the Ecclesiastical Latin in this entry, as the term bella aqua (literally "fair water") is recorded in its marginalia. In later centuries, the area became the benefice of one of Llandaff's prebends, named as the "Prebend of Fairwell", or the "Prebend of Farewell" in the cathedral's own documents. Even today, one of the cathedral's historic canons' stalls is still named "Fairwater".

== Amenities and landmarks ==
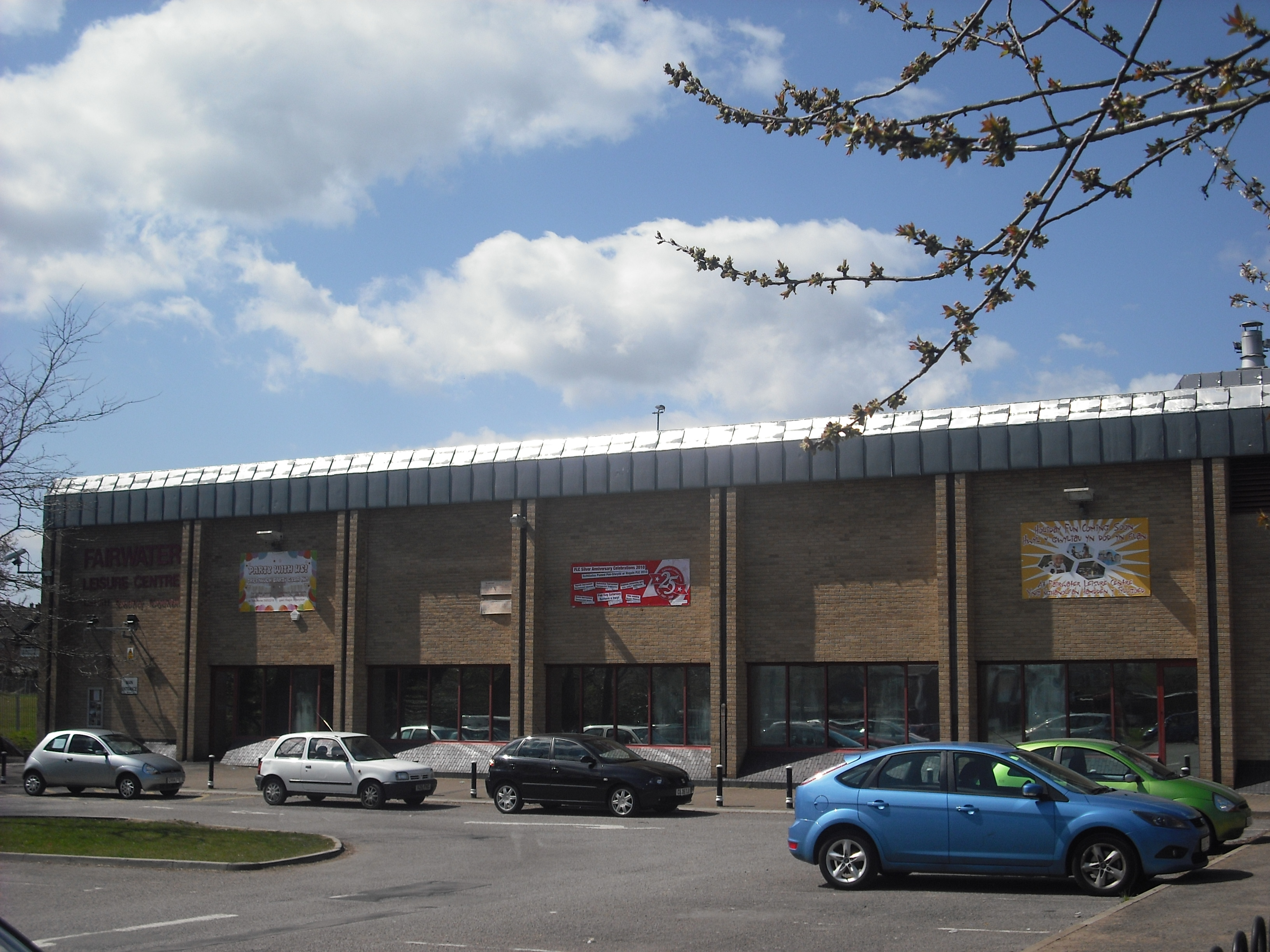
Fairwater Leisure Centre

This leafy district is divided between the mainly privately owned 1930s semi-detached housing developments at the southern end, and more 1950s public housing stock towards the northern end closer to neighbouring Pentrebane. It includes Fairwater Park (known locally as "the Dell"), Fairwater Leisure Centre, a skatepark and numerous playing fields.

Fairwater has two secondary schools. The larger of the two, with over a thousand pupils, is the Welsh-medium Ysgol Gyfun Gymraeg Plasmawr. The other is Cantonian High School, which has nearly 700 pupils.

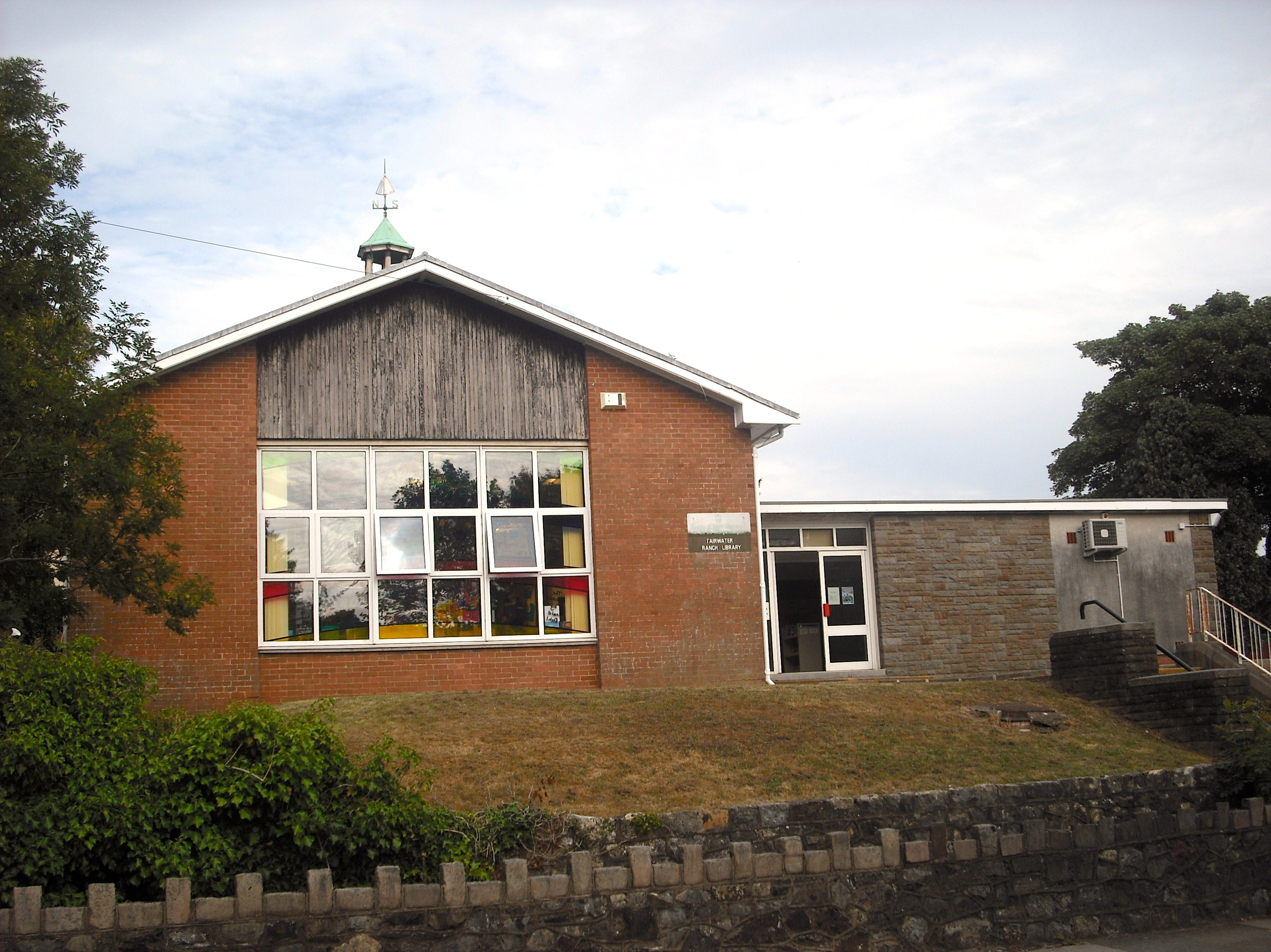
Fairwater Library

The building in which Plasmawr stands was originally opened in 1959 as Waterhall Secondary Modern School. Pupils at the school included Martyn Woodroffe an Olympic swimming Silver Medalist in 1968 Summer Olympics in Mexico. It is on the grounds of old Cantonian lower school, but in recent times has had many new developments built on the site. Peter Lea Primary and Fairwater Primary schools are in the area. Cantonian has produced several Welsh international football (soccer) players. In recent times Ryan Green (once Wales' youngest international), Jermaine Easter and Joe Ledley and, a little further back, John Toshack. Famous former pupils also include the model and Gary Lineker's wife Danielle Bux and director of the film Human Traffic, Justin Kerrigan.

Fairwater Brook was a childhood haunt of Roald Dahl, who lived in Radyr and studied in nearby Llandaff.

Fairwater Park, known locally as "The Dell" is the site of one of Britain's first artificial ski slopes, built in 1969.

Fairwater Green is a local area of shops, supposedly named for the area of grass nearby.

Fairwater Library opened in 1960, is a small branch library with a small book collection, public access computers and study space is open five days a week.

Ty Bronna is a listed Grade II building on St Fagan's Road, built between 1903 and 1906. It is the only listed building in Wales designed by C. F. A. Voysey.

== Electoral ward ==
Fairwater is both an electoral ward, and a community of the City of Cardiff. There is no community council for the area. The electoral ward of Fairwater falls within the parliamentary constituency of Cardiff West. It is bounded by Creigiau & St. Fagans to the west; Llandaff to the east; Canton to the southeast; Ely to the south; and Radyr to the north. Previously represented by the Labour Party it has since May 2008 been represented on Cardiff Council by Plaid Cymru councillors.

== Transport ==
Fairwater is well served by public transport with three railway stations - Fairwater in the heart of the area, Danescourt in the north and Waun-Gron Park in the south. All 3 stations are on the Cardiff City Line with services northbound to Radyr and southbound to Cardiff Central via Ninian Park.

Fairwater has bus services provided by Cardiff Bus operating bus service 61 through the area to Pentrebane and the infrequent 32 bus service through Fairwater to St Fagans.

The main road running through the east of the area is Western Avenue (A48) linking it to Ely Bridge, Ely, Canton and the city centre to the south and Gabalfa, eastern districts and the M4 J30 Cardiff East to the north. St Fagans Road is a country road leading west out of Fairwater to St. Fagans, Ely, Culverhouse Cross and M4 J33 Cardiff West

== Notable people from Fairwater ==
- John Toshack football player, former Welsh football manager, attended Cantonian High School.
- Patti Flynn jazz singer, author and founder of Black History Wales lived in Fairwater in later life.
- Terry Holmes Wales and British Lions international rugby union player
- Joe Ledley Wales football (soccer) international, who attended Cantonian High School.
- Martyn Woodroffe Olympic swimming silver medalist at the Mexico 1968 Summer Olympics
- Justin Kerrigan, Welsh film maker who wrote and directed Human Traffic, attended Cantonian High School.
- Neil McEvoy political party leader, founder of the Propel Party. Also a Cardiff councillor for Fairwater.
