= Ninian Park railway station =

Railway station in Cardiff, Wales

Ninian Park Welsh: Parc Ninian
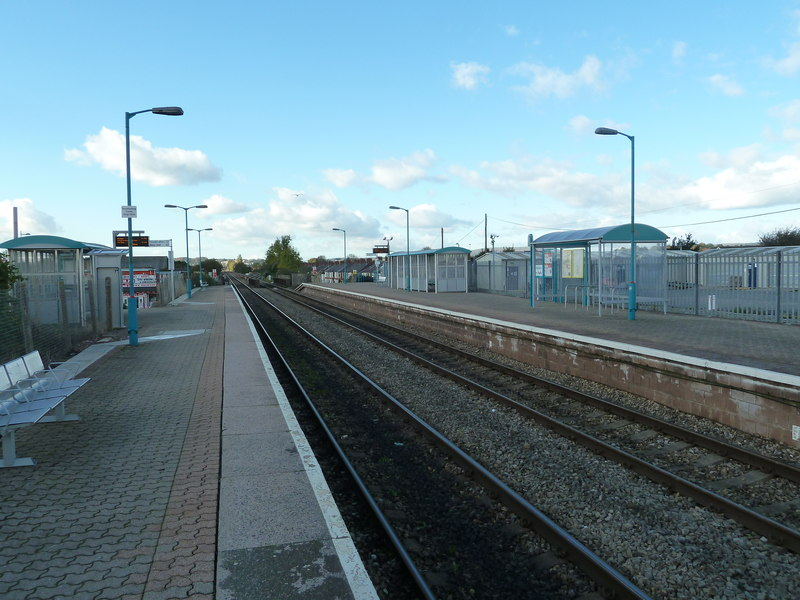

General information
- Location: Leckwith, Cardiff; Wales
- Coordinates: 51°28′35″N 3°12′04″W
- Grid reference: ST166759
- Manager: Transport for Wales
- Platforms: 2

Other information
- Station code: NNP
- Classification: DfT category F2

Key dates
- 1912: opened
- 1939: closed
- after 1945: reopened for special trains
- 1987: regular services restored

Passengers
- 2020/21: ▼22,410
- 2021/22: ▲57,758
- 2022/23: ▲73,586
- 2023/24: ▲0.105 million
- 2024/25: ▲0.156 million
Location
Notes
- Passenger statistics from the Office of Rail and Road

Ninian Park railway station serves the Leckwith and South Canton areas of Cardiff, just outside Cardiff city centre.

The station is 1 mile (1.6 km) west of Cardiff Central. It was fully opened to regular passenger service in 1987 when the City Line reopened to passenger services . As the station was built for main line special trains it has the longest platforms on the line at 154 metres for both Up and Down platforms, which can accommodating up to seven coaches, rather than four coaches as at the other three stations (Danescourt railway station, Fairwater railway station and Waun-gron Park railway station) which opened at the same time, with platforms of 84 metres for both Up and Down. The station is near the former Cardiff City F.C. stadium and is next to the South Wales Main Line, but trains on this route do not stop. Cardiff Canton Traction Maintenance Depot is adjacent to the station.

== History ==
The original halt at Ninian Park was opened on 2 November 1912 by the Great Western Railway It was used mainly for football specials but occasional other use until it was closed on 10 September 1939. It was subsequently reopened after 1945 and continued to be used periodically for football specials. On 5 October 1987 the station was reopened for regular services when a regular passenger service was introduced to the Cardiff City Line.

== Stadium ==
Cardiff City Stadium is within five minutes' walk of the station, over the road from the station's namesake Ninian Park Stadium.

== Services ==
Trains run every half-hour in each direction Mondays - Saturday daytimes, eastbound to Coryton via Cardiff Central and westbound to Radyr (where connections are available for stations further north). This drops to hourly during the evenings. There is no Sunday service.

From December 2015 a limited number of mainline trains (Maesteg Line services) call at Ninian Park, rejoining the mainline at Leckwith Junction to the west of the station. This route is also occasionally used as a diversionary route for GWR services. Additionally, Vale of Glamorgan Line trains terminate here when Cardiff Central is unavailable due to engineering works.

Preceding station	National Rail	Following station
Cardiff Central	Transport for Wales; Cardiff City Line	Waun-gron Park
Cardiff Central	Transport for Wales; Maesteg / Cardiff Central – Cheltenham Spa limited service	Pontyclun
Cardiff Central	Transport for Wales; South Wales Main Line limited service	Pontyclun

== See also ==
- List of railway stations in Cardiff
- Rail transport in Cardiff
