= Waun-gron Park railway station =

Railway station in Cardiff, Wales

Waun-gron Park Welsh: Parc Waun-gron
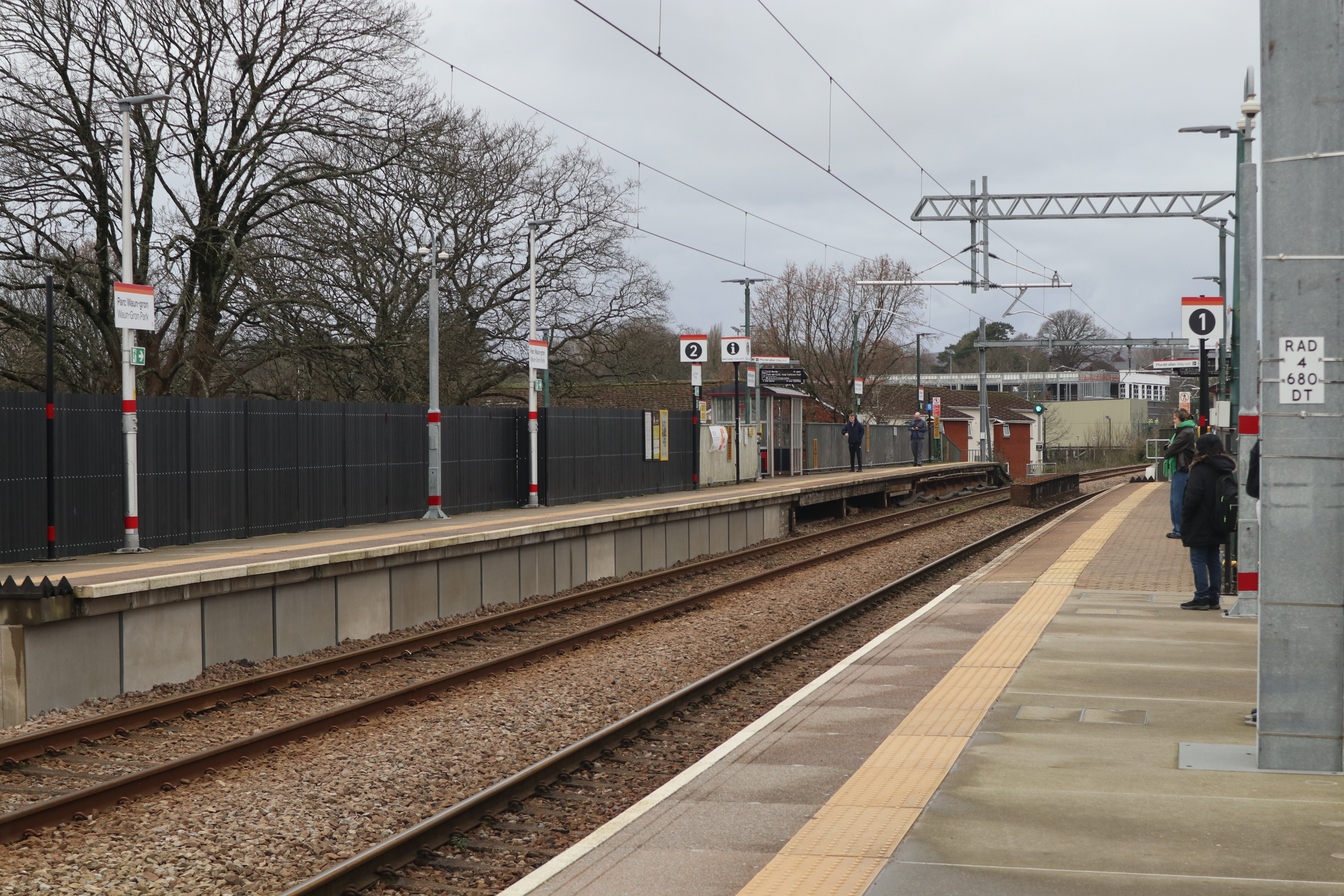

General information
- Location: Fairwater, Cardiff; Wales
- Coordinates: 51°29′18″N 3°13′47″W
- Grid reference: ST147772
- Managed by: Transport for Wales
- Platforms: 2

Other information
- Station code: WNG
- Classification: DfT category F2

History
- Opened: 1987

Passengers
- 2020/21: ▼7,896
- 2021/22: ▲35,524
- 2022/23: ▲52,768
- 2023/24: ▲66,070
- 2024/25: ▲0.116 million
Location
Notes
- Passenger statistics from the Office of Rail and Road

Waun-gron Park railway station serves the Fairwater area of Cardiff, Wales. Passenger services are currently operated by Transport for Wales.

The station was opened in 1987 when a passenger service was introduced to the City Line, though the line itself opened in 1859 and was originally goods only. The station has an unusual staggered platform arrangement: one platform straddles the bridge over the roadway.

Waun-gron Park is the nearest station to the large suburb of Ely which is 10 minutes' walk from the station along Western Avenue and over Ely Bridge.

== Services ==
The Monday to Friday off-peak service is two trains per hour each way. Eastbound to Cardiff Central, Cardiff Queen Street, and then Coryton, and westbound to Radyr.

Journey times from Waun-gron Park are eight minutes to Cardiff Central, 11 minutes to Radyr and 28 minutes to Coryton.

There is no Sunday service, although some trains running to destinations such as Merthyr Tydfil, Aberdare and Treherbert from Cardiff Central sometimes pass Waun-gron Park on the City Line when the usual line for these services through Cardiff Queen Street is closed for engineering work.

Preceding station	National Rail	Following station
Ninian Park	Transport for Wales; Cardiff City Line	Fairwater

== See also ==
- List of railway stations in Cardiff
- Rail transport in Cardiff
