= Bishop Hannon High School =

Defunct Roman Catholic school in Cardiff

Bishop Hannon High School was a Roman Catholic comprehensive school on Beechley Drive, Pentrebane, Cardiff, Wales.

The school was built in the 1960s on a 17-acre site on the edge of what was then the new housing estates of Fairwater. Fifty pupils started in September 1965, before the school was completed in January 1966. The school was designed to take 600 pupils.

Notable alumni of the school include Cardiff, Wales and British Lions rugby player Terry Holmes, Musician Pino Palladino and the Conservative politician Simon Hoare.

By the early 1980s the school had 670 pupils.

The school was closed in 1987 and its pupils transferred to other Roman Catholic schools in the city.
