= Pentrebane =

District of Cardiff, Wales

Coordinates: 51°29′37″N 3°15′11″W

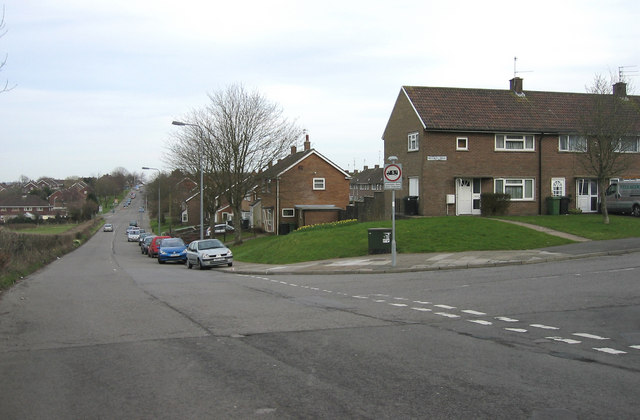
Pentrebane Road, Pentrebane

Pentrebane (Welsh: Pentre-Baen) is a district in the west of Cardiff, capital of Wales. It is part of the Fairwater community.

== Description ==
Pentrebane was built in the 1960s on agricultural land to the northwest of Fairwater. The newer estate sits on the top of the hill overlooking Fairwater and Llandaff, and on the cusp of St. Fagans and the Vale of Glamorgan. To the north of the suburb lies the route of the former Llantrisant and Taff Vale Junction Railway and is served by Fairwater railway station.

There are three primary schools near each other: Holy Family R.C. Primary, Pentrebane Primary and Ysgol Coed Y Gof. A Roman Catholic secondary school, Bishop Hannon was built in Pentrebane in the 1960s but demolished around 1987 to make way for housing (on what is now called Bell Fields).

== Governance ==
Pentrebance falls within the Fairwater electoral ward for elections to Cardiff Council.

== Notable people ==
The Wales footballer Ryan Giggs grew up living with his grandparents in Pentrebane.
