= Llandaf railway station =

Railway station in Cardiff, Wales

Llandaf
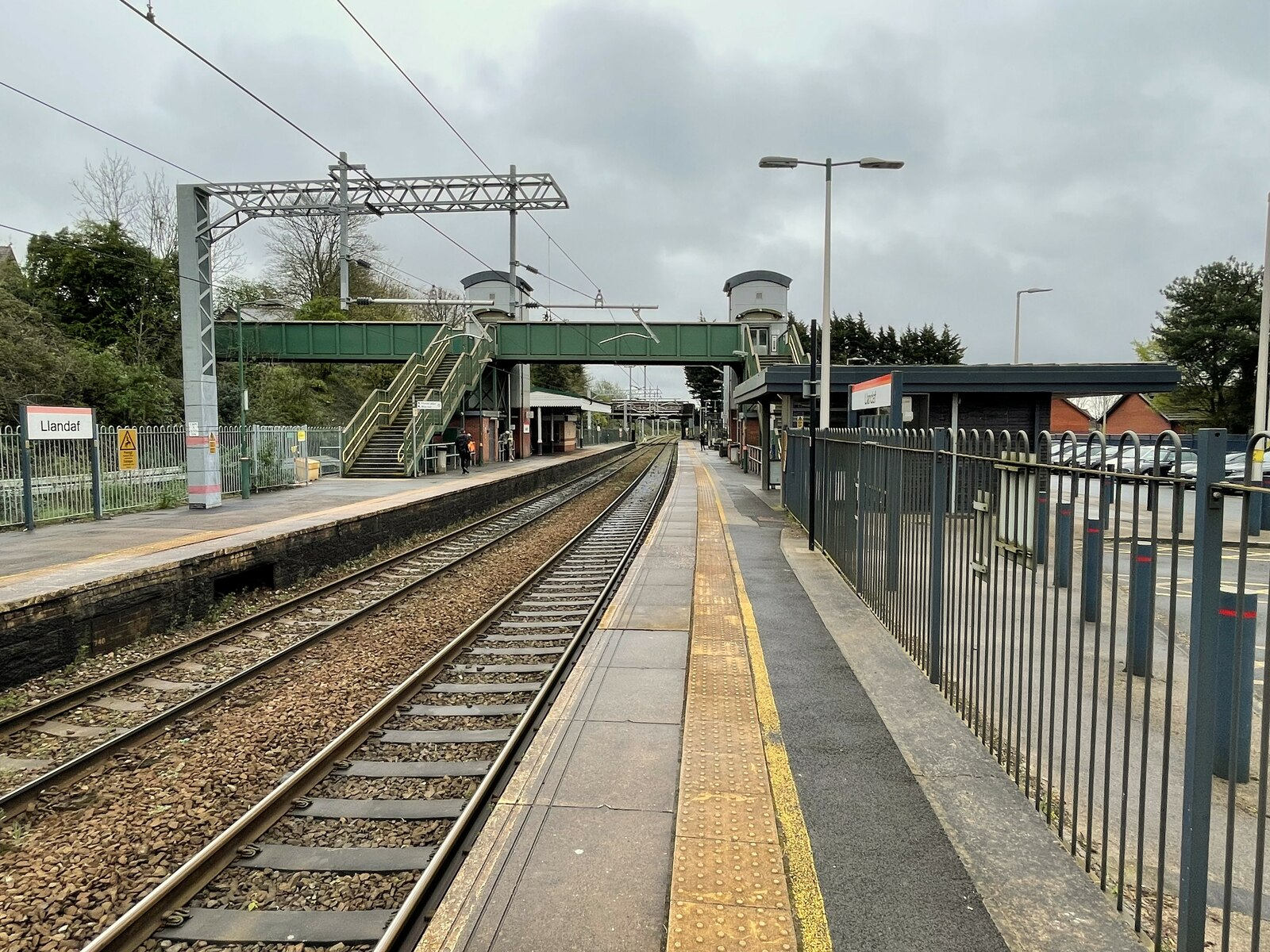

General information
- Location: Llandaff North, Cardiff; Wales
- Coordinates: 51°30′31″N 3°13′45″W
- Grid reference: ST147795
- Managed by: Transport for Wales
- Platforms: 2

Other information
- Station code: LLN
- Classification: DfT category E

Key dates
- 9 October 1840: Opened as Llandaff
- by 1910: Renamed Llandaff for Whitchurch
- 12 May 1980: Renamed Llandaf

Passengers
- 2020/21: ▼81,824
- 2021/22: ▲0.262 million
- 2022/23: ▲0.317 million
- 2023/24: ▲0.355 million
- 2024/25: ▲0.431 million
Location
Notes
- Passenger statistics from the Office of Rail and Road

Llandaf railway station is in Llandaff North, Cardiff, Wales. It serves the areas of Llandaff North and Whitchurch.

== History ==
The Taff Vale Railway opened the station in 1840, only ten years after the first stations for locomotive-drawn trains had been opened on the Liverpool and Manchester Railway. Originally named Llandaff, the station had been renamed Llandaff for Whitchurch by 1910, and on 12 May 1980 it was again renamed Llandaf.

In 2015 work started on replacing the old footbridge with one that offers step-free access to all platforms. This was funded by Network Rail and the Department of Transport Access for all Scheme. A new ticket office opened in November 2017 to replace the old station building (on platform 2) which is open six days a week.

Further improvements planned in connection with the proposed South Wales Metro network included new waiting shelters, improved bike storage, refurbishment of the existing car park, extra lighting and CCTV.

== Services ==
The station has a frequent Monday to Saturday service, and a more limited Sunday service, throughout the year. Under the timetable reforms of Arriva Trains Wales in 2006, the station benefited from the introduction of a Monday to Saturday service with six trains per hour in each direction. Under June 2024 timetable changes, four southbound trains per hour run to Cardiff Central and two to Cardiff Bay, while all northbound services run to Pontypridd with two continuing to Treherbert, two to Merthyr Tydfil and two terminating at Pontypridd.

The station is popular with commuters between Llandaf and Cathays, Cardiff Queen Street, Cardiff Central and (from June 2024) Cardiff Bay. There have been issues with overcrowding, with trains especially crowded in rush hours.

Preceding station	National Rail	Following station
Cathays	Transport for Wales Rail; Merthyr Line	Radyr
Cathays	Transport for Wales Rail; Rhondda Line	Radyr

== See also ==
- List of railway stations in Cardiff
- Rail transport in Cardiff
