= Fairwater railway station =

Railway station in Cardiff, Wales

Fairwater Welsh: Y Tyllgoed
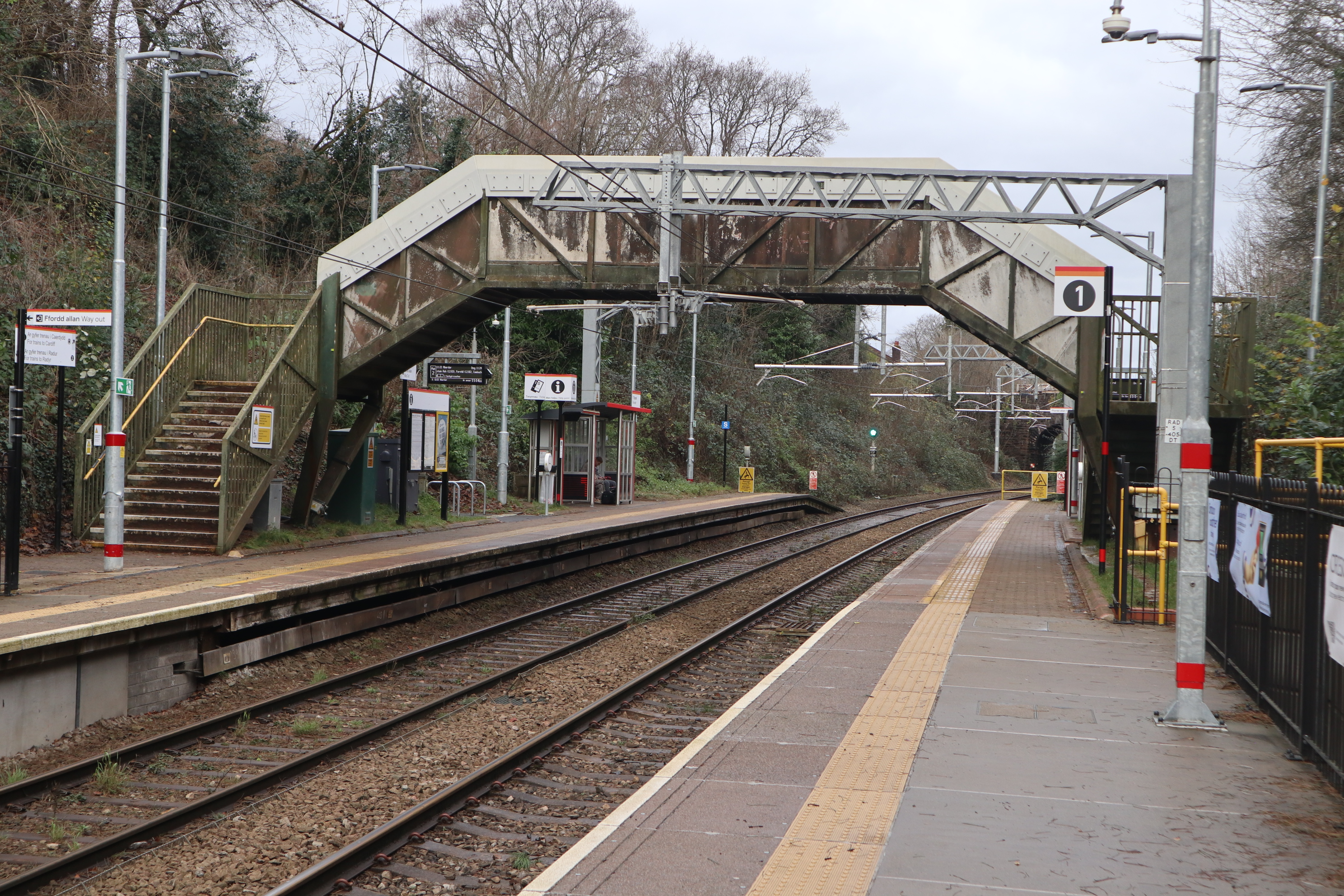

General information
- Location: Fairwater, Cardiff; Wales
- Coordinates: 51°29′38″N 3°14′02″W
- Grid reference: ST144779
- Managed by: Transport for Wales
- Platforms: 2

Other information
- Station code: FRW
- Classification: DfT category F2

History
- Opened: 1987

Passengers
- 2020/21: ▼12,222
- 2021/22: ▲40,106
- 2022/23: ▲53,388
- 2023/24: ▲64,542
- 2024/25: ▲0.106 million
Location
Notes
- Passenger statistics from the Office of Rail and Road

Fairwater railway station is a railway station serving the Fairwater area of Cardiff, Wales. Passenger services are currently operated by Transport for Wales.

The station was opened in 1987 when a passenger service was introduced to the City Line. The line on which it is situated on was originally goods only and was opened by the Taff Vale Railway in 1859 to serve the docks at Penarth.

== Services ==
On Monday to Saturdays, two trains per hour in each direction serve Fairwater. Southbound services run towards Cardiff Central and continue to Coryton; northbound trains run to Radyr. There is no Sunday service. The station is unstaffed.

Preceding station	National Rail	Following station
Waun-gron Park	Transport for Wales; Cardiff City Line	Danescourt

== See also ==
- List of railway stations in Cardiff
- Rail transport in Cardiff
