= Llandaff North =

District and community of Cardiff, Wales

Coordinates: 51.502°N 3.226°W

- Community
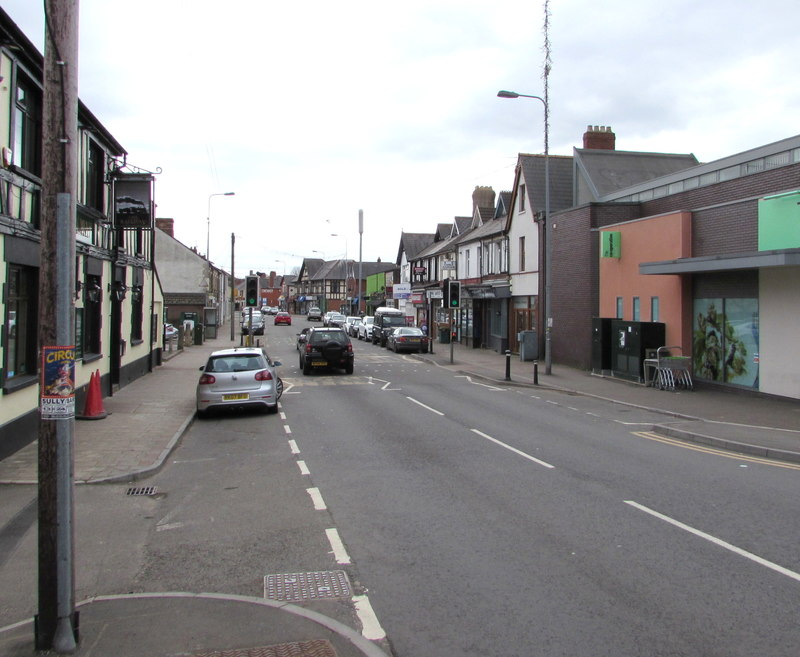
- Station Road

- Location within Cardiff
- Principal area: Cardiff
- Country: Wales
- Sovereign state: United Kingdom
- Police: South Wales
- Fire: South Wales
- Ambulance: Welsh
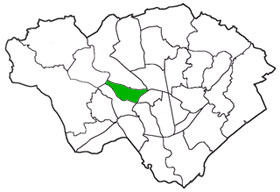
- List of places UK Wales Cardiff

Llandaff North (Welsh: Ystum Taf) is a district, community and coterminous electoral ward in the north of Cardiff, the capital city of Wales.

== Description ==
It is located in the north of Cardiff and can be considered a two-part ward, each containing about half the population; a northern section of mainly middle class housing, and a southern section commonly known as the Gabalfa housing estate which consists of public sector and former public sector housing stock. When the Community Charge (or Poll Tax) was introduced in 1990 the Gabalfa housing estate and also parts of the Mynachdy housing estate were placed into the new Llandaff North Electoral Ward, and the boundaries of the Gabalfa Electoral Ward were moved and redrawn to create a now separate ward to the south east of the new Llandaff North ward. This new Gabalfa ward still includes the Gabalfa Interchange and also some parts of Mynachdy, but no longer includes any of the Gabalfa housing estate. Llandaff North is located directly north of Llandaff but is an electoral ward which falls within the wider parliamentary constituency of Cardiff North. This constituency is known as a key marginal and is one of a handful within the United Kingdom which is decisive in a British General Election. Being mainly middle-class and "swing voters" the residents of Llandaff North are of some interest to national politicians.

Llandaff North is quite a small and quiet residential area which is served by a number of village shops, including cafes, a pharmacy and an artisan bakery. The south-western boundary of Llandaff North is formed by the River Taff which also separates Llandaff North from Llandaff. These two areas are linked by a road bridge which spans this river, where Llandaff Rowing Club is located, and which also provides a view of Llandaff Cathedral. The Welsh name, Ystum Taf, means "bend in the River Taff".

Llandaff North is also home to Hailey Park along the River Taff, with large playing fields, tennis courts and two children's playgrounds. The land that became Hailey Park was originally donated by Claude Hailey.

== History ==
Llandaff North, along with Llandaff, was incorporated into Cardiff in 1922.
Population (June 1999) = 8,250 (Cardiff Research Centre Estimate)
Population (mid-2007) = 7,778 (Cardiff Research Centre Estimate, based on Office for National Statistics figures)
Population (2011) = 8,344 (United Kingdom Census)

== Schools ==
Hawthorn Junior School and Hawthorn Infant School were amalgamated in June 2009 on the Infant school site to form Hawthorn Primary School, with large investment into new buildings and facilities. In 2016 Hawthorn Primary School was one of the most over-subscribed schools in Cardiff.

Cardiff Steiner School is an independent school that is part of the Steiner Waldorf education movement, with pupils from 3 to 18. It opened in 2013 in the former Hawthorn Junior School building.

Ysgol Gyfun Gymraeg Glantaf is a state secondary school based on the outskirts of Llandaff North. It is a Welsh-medium comprehensive school of non-denominational religion which serves some children from Llandaff North and from across south Wales.

Whitchurch High School is a state secondary school based in the Whitchurch area of Cardiff. It is an English-medium comprehensive school of non-denominational religion which serves the majority of state educated children in Llandaff North.

The Cathedral School is a preparatory and secondary school based in the Llandaff area of Cardiff. It is an independent boarding and day school which has strong links with Llandaff Cathedral. Parents in Llandaff North wanting to educate their children privately (but locally) send their children to this school.

== Facilities ==
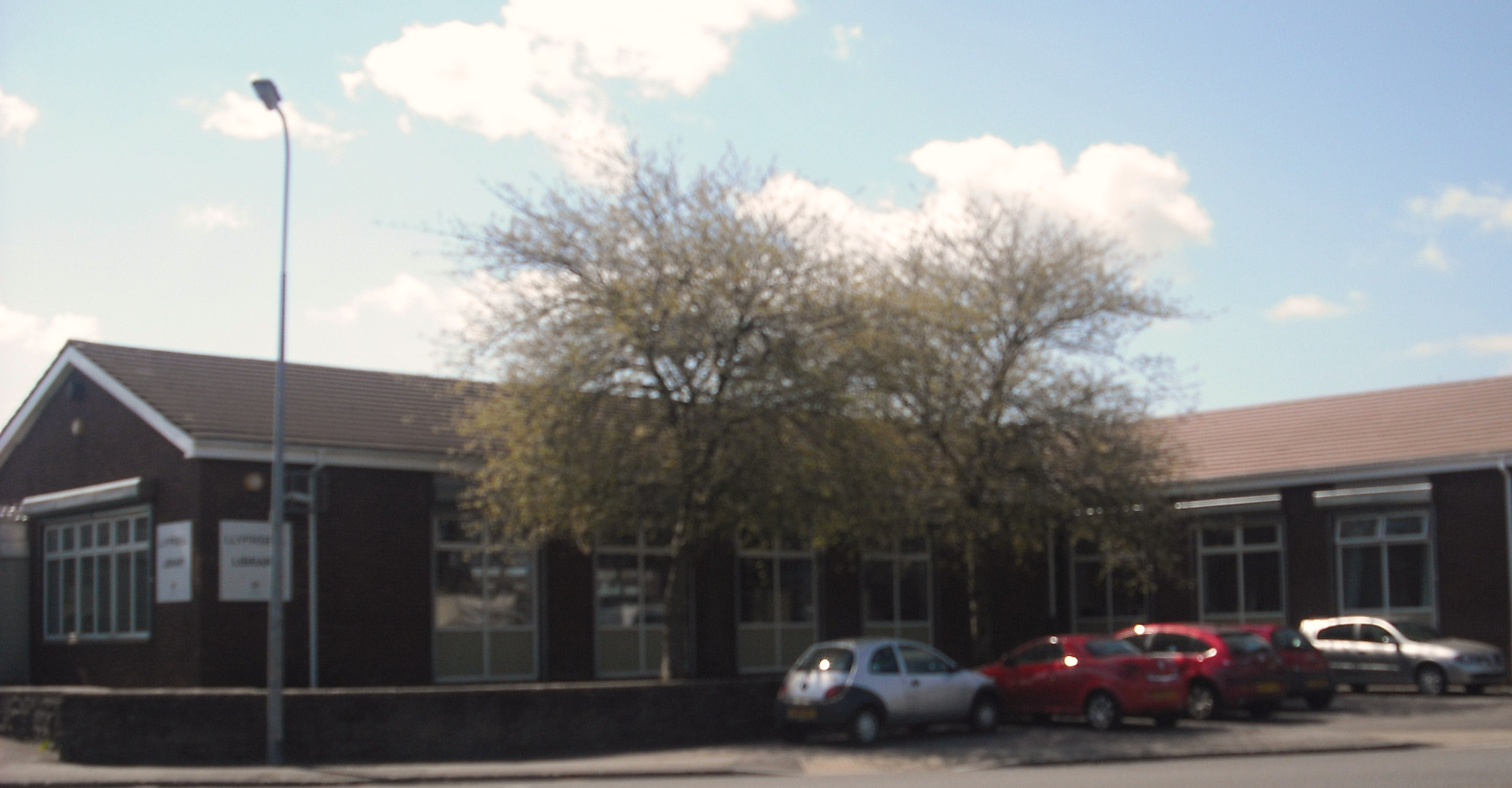
Llandaff North Library

Llandaff North Medical Centre is a modern purpose built surgery constructed in 1997. Llandaff North Community Centre is centre for people to arrange meetings and mostly used for Old Aged Pensioner's Bingo. Hawthorn Junior School was closed in 2009 and Hawthorn Infant School has now incorporated the juniors section with large investment into new buildings and facilities. Llandaff North Library is located on Gabalfa Avenue.

== Electoral ward ==
Llandaff North is both an electoral ward, and a community of the City of Cardiff. There is no community council for the area.

The electoral ward of Llandaff North falls within the parliamentary constituency of Cardiff North. It is bounded by the wards of Radyr & Morganstown to the northwest; Whitchurch & Tongwynlais to the north; Heath to the northeast; Gabalfa to the east; and Llandaff to the south.

== Transport ==
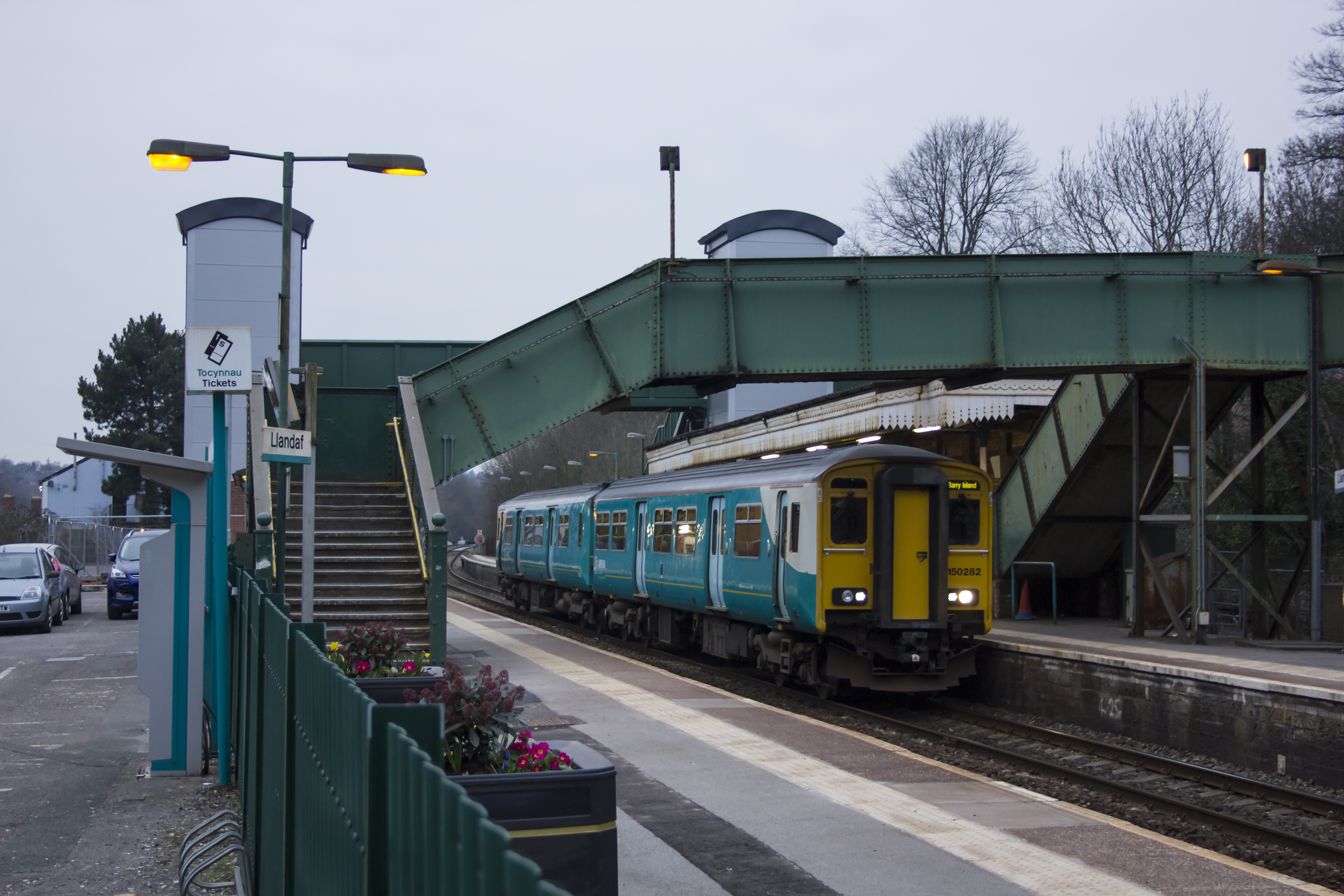
Llandaf railway station is in Llandaff North

Llandaf railway station serves the area with services northbound to Treherbert and Merthyr Tydfil via Radyr and Pontypridd. Southbound services operate to Cardiff Central via Cardiff Queen Street.

Cardiff Bus services 24 (Llandaff-Pontcanna-Central Station) and 25 (Whitchurch-Birchgrove-Gabalfa-Cathays-Central Station) run frequently through the area.

The A4054 road follows Station Road and Bridge Road, leading north to Whitchurch and the M4 motorway, and south to Llandaff and the city centre.

== Sports clubs ==
- Llandaff North RFC
- Llandaff Rowing Club – A sports rowing club based on the Llandaff bank of the River Taff, which uses the stretch of the river that forms the southern boundary of Llandaff North.
