= Danescourt =

Suburb of Cardiff, Wales

Coordinates: 51.504°N 3.242°W

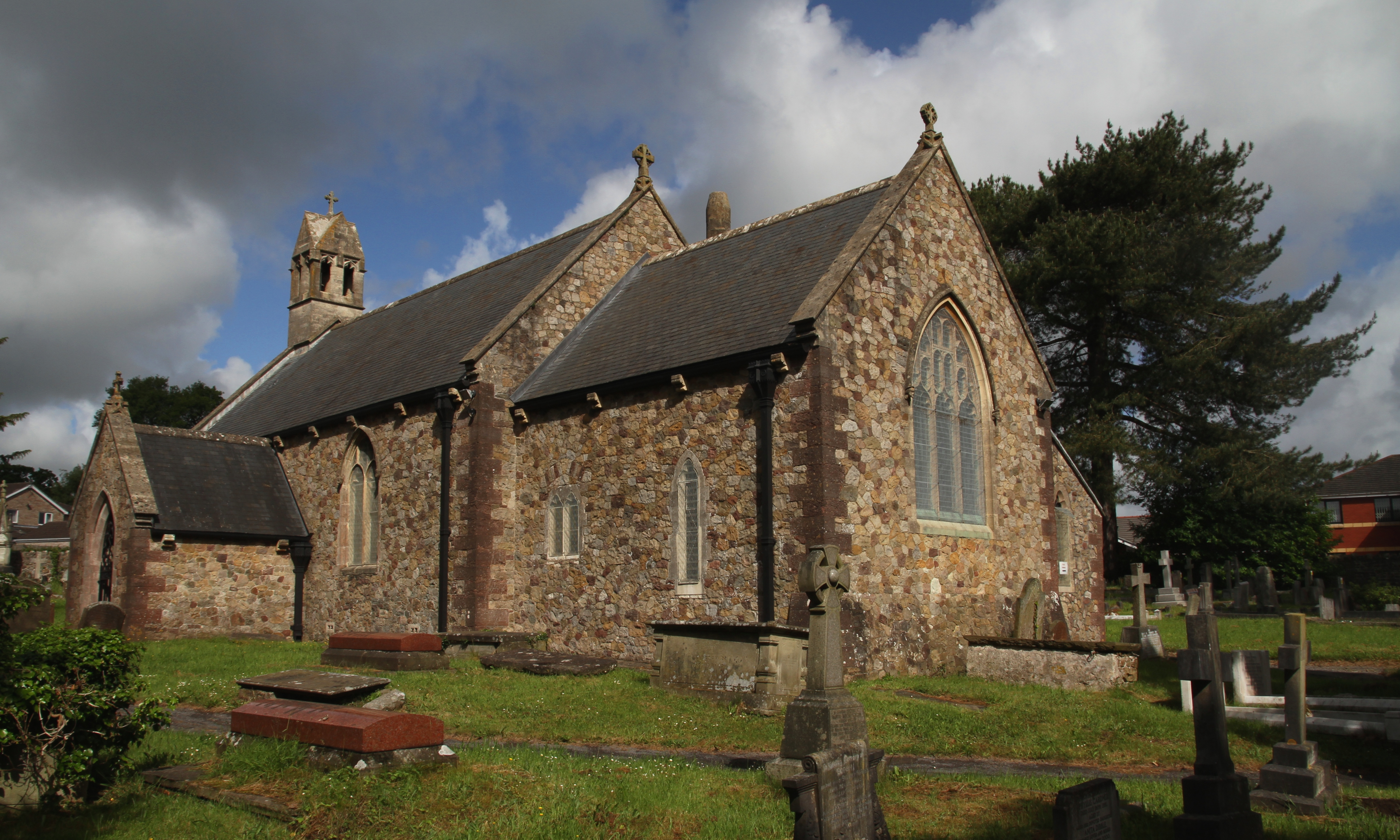
- St John the Baptist parish church

- Location within Cardiff
- OS grid reference: ST1379
- Principal area: Cardiff
- Preserved county: Cardiff
- Country: Wales
- Sovereign state: United Kingdom
- Post town: Cardiff
- Postcode district: CF5
- Dialling code: 029
- Police: South Wales
- Fire: South Wales
- Ambulance: Welsh
- UK Parliament: Cardiff West
- Senedd Cymru – Welsh Parliament: Cardiff West
- Website: Danescourt Community Association

Danescourt is an outer suburb of western Cardiff, just over 3 miles (5 km) northwest of Cardiff city centre. Danescourt is part of the Llandaff Community.

== History ==
Danescourt is built around Radyr's Church in Wales parish church of St John the Baptist and the site of Radyr's former 14th century manor house. The toponym "Danescourt" was devised when the housing estate was built in the 1970s. It is a portmanteau from the names of two homesteads that predate the suburb: Radyr Court Farm and Danesbrook House.

St John the Baptist parish church, beside Radyr Chain, is nearly 800 years old, but was much altered by a Victorian restoration in the 19th century. Radyr Court farmhouse is now the Radyr Court Inn public house.

The Taff Vale Railway built the railway through Danescourt in the 19th century. It became part of the Great Western Railway in the 1923 grouping. British Railways opened Danescourt railway station as part of the Cardiff City Line in 1987.

== Amenities ==
As well as trains, Danescourt is served by several bus routes through the area operated by Cardiff Bus and Stagecoach South Wales.

Danescourt has a primary school. Next to St John's parish church and the Radyr Court Inn is a shopping centre that includes a Co-operative store, a newsagent with a Post Office, a nursery for children and Forte School of Music. Close to the shopping centre there are a dentist's surgery, a GP's practice, a pharmacy and a women's hairdressers.

Danescourt Christian Fellowship (DCF Church) meets in various locations in Danescourt and Fairwater.

Danescourt is in Llandaff ward, which has two seats on Cardiff Council.

The area around Timothy Rees Close forms the "Llandaff Five" statistical area, which the 2011 Census identified as the least deprived area of Wales.
