= Danescourt railway station =

Railway station in Cardiff, Wales

Danescourt
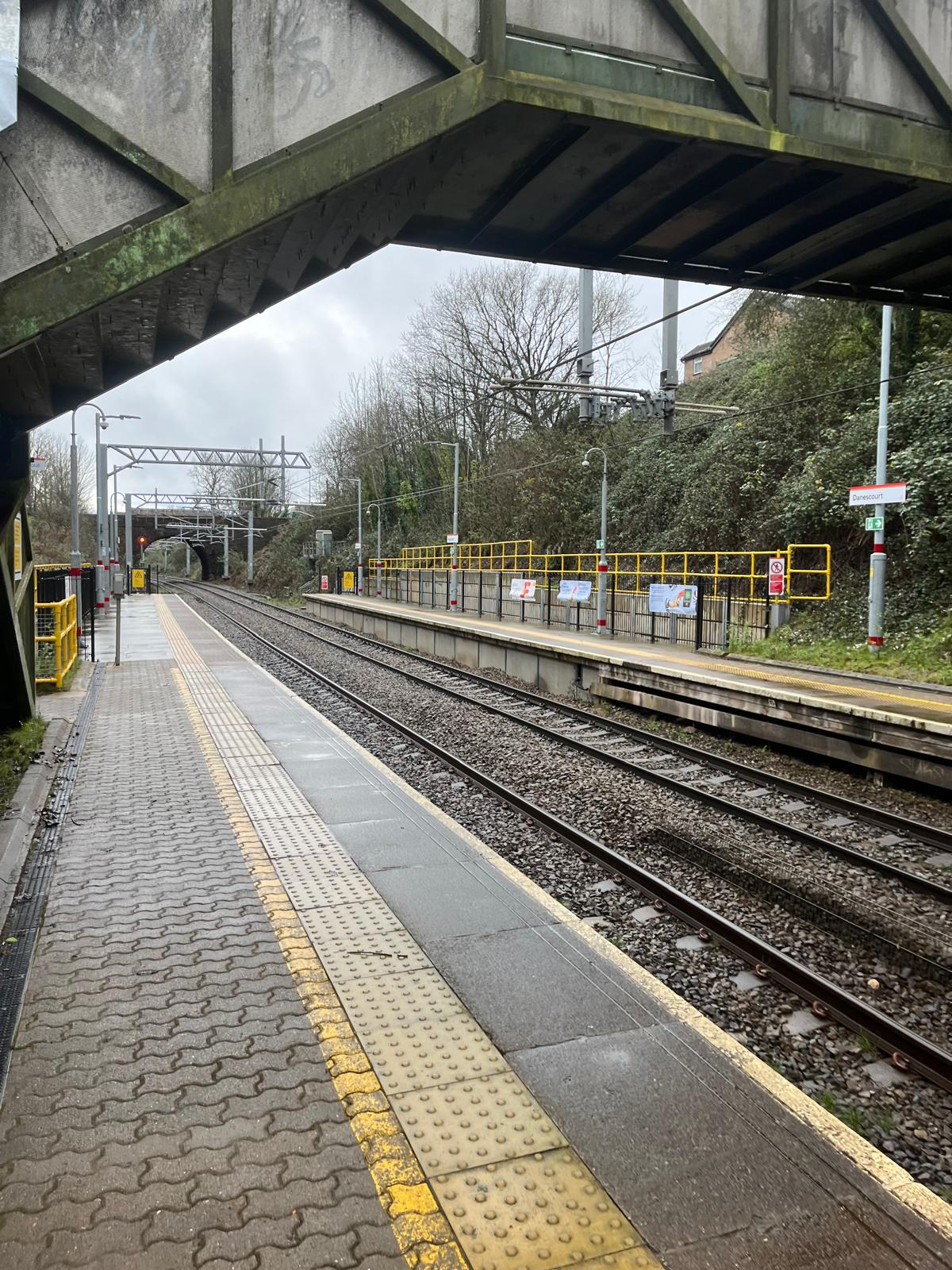
- The station in December 2024 following extension.

General information
- Location: Danescourt, Cardiff; Wales
- Coordinates: 51°30′02″N 3°14′02″W
- Grid reference: ST144786
- Manager: Transport for Wales
- Platforms: 2

Other information
- Station code: DCT
- Classification: DfT category F2

History
- Opened: 1987

Passengers
- 2020/21: ▼7,402
- 2021/22: ▲31,796
- 2022/23: ▲39,874
- 2023/24: ▲52,492
- 2024/25: ▲83,824
Location
Notes
- Passenger statistics from the Office of Rail and Road

Danescourt railway station is a railway station serving the Danescourt suburb of Cardiff, Wales.

== History ==
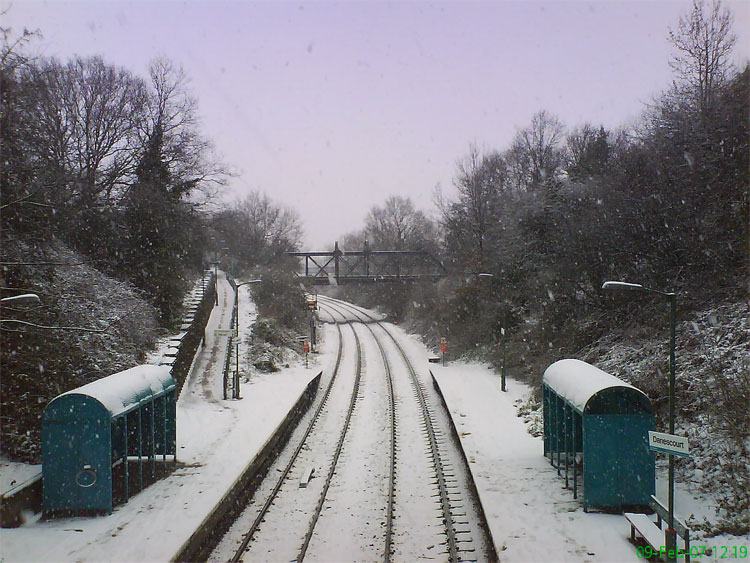
The station seen after snowfall in 2007

The station is situated on the Cardiff City Line 3 miles (5 km) north of Cardiff Central. The City Line was freight only from its opening (in 1859) until 1987, when British Rail introduced a passenger service between Cardiff Central and Radyr.

The station is currently operated by Transport for Wales using Class 150 Sprinters and, recently, Class 756 FLIRTs following the electrification of the Cardiff City Line and other lines in the South Wales Metro completed in April 2024. Both of these classes are expected to be cascaded by the Class 398 tram-trains which are expected to enter service in late 2025.

== Facilities ==
Both of the station's two platforms are accessible for disabled passengers via ramps. The Cardiff Central-bound platform is accessible via a ramp from Llantrisant Road, whilst the Radyr-bound platform is accessible via a residential road (Beale Close) off the main road (Danescourt Way). A footbridge links the two platforms. The station has capacity for 4 car trains following platform extensions in 2023 and 2024.

== Services ==
Before 2 June 2024, the Cardiff City Line operated a 2 train per hour service from Radyr to Coryton via Cardiff Central, excluding Sundays of which there was no service. Following this date, Transport for Wales now operates a 4 train per hour service and Monday-Saturday and a 2 train per hour service on Sundays:

The typical Monday-Saturday off-peak service is:

- Two trains per hour in each direction: Eastbound to Merthyr Tydfil via Cardiff Central and Cardiff Queen Street, and Westbound to Aberdare via Radyr, which is the next station along.

The typical Sunday service is:

- One train per hour in each direction: Eastbound to Cardiff Central and Westbound to Aberdare.

| Preceding station | National Rail | Following station |
|---|---|---|
| Fairwater | Transport for Wales; Cardiff City Line | Radyr |

== See also ==
- List of railway stations in Cardiff
- Rail transport in Cardiff
