= Cardiff City Line =

Commuter railway line in Cardiff, Wales

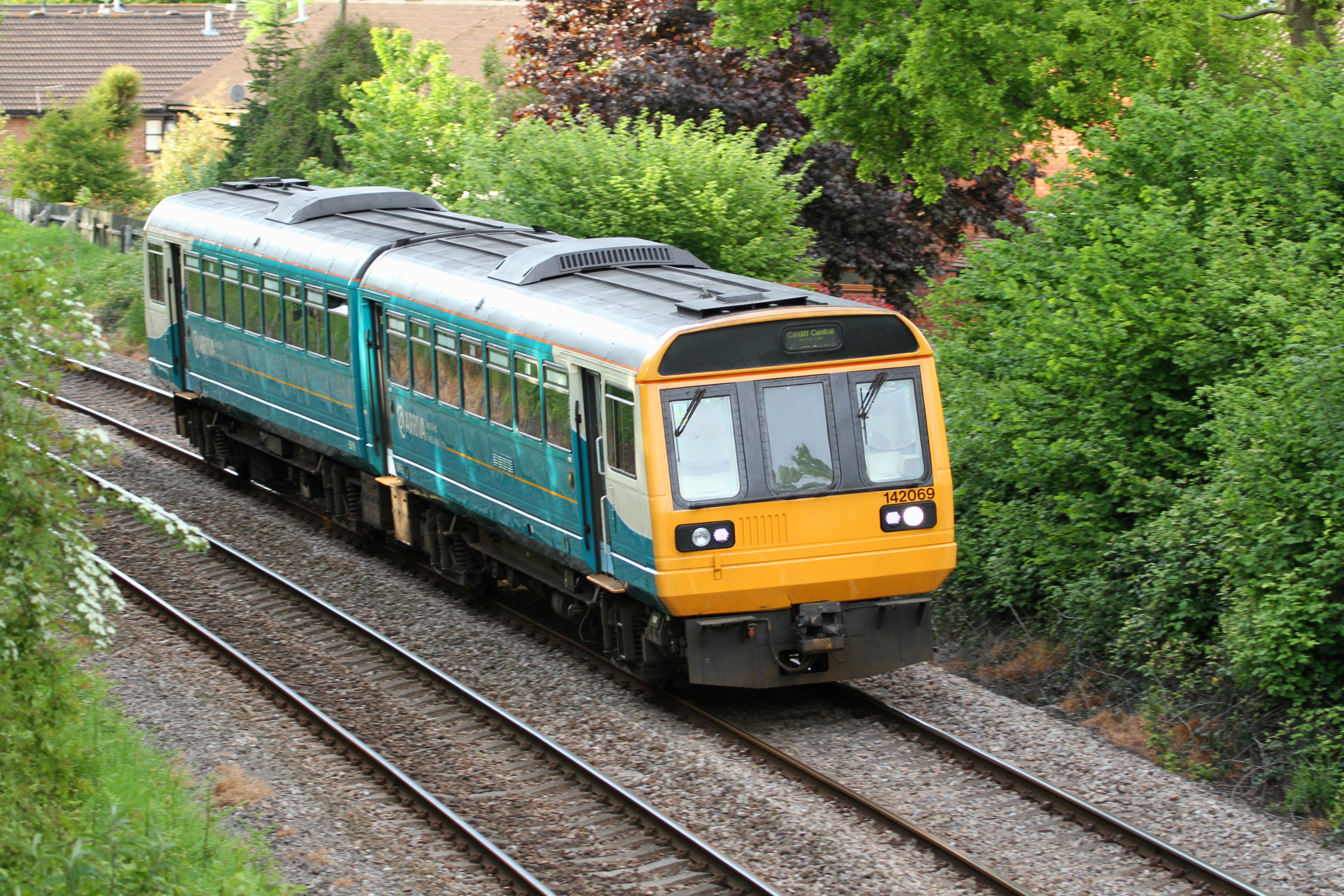
- A Class 142 train approaches Danescourt en route to Coryton

Overview
- Owner: Network Rail and Transport for Wales
- Locale: Cardiff
- Termini: Cardiff Central; Radyr
- Stations: 4

Service
- Type: Suburban rail
- System: National Rail
- Operator: Transport for Wales Rail
- Rolling stock: Class 150 DMUs; Class 231; Class 756

History
- Opened: 1987

Technical
- Line length: 4 miles 66 chains (7.8 km)
- Number of tracks: double track throughout
- Track gauge: 4 ft 8 1/2 in (1,435 mm) standard gauge
- Electrification: 25 kV 50 hz AC OLE (Discontinuous)
Route map
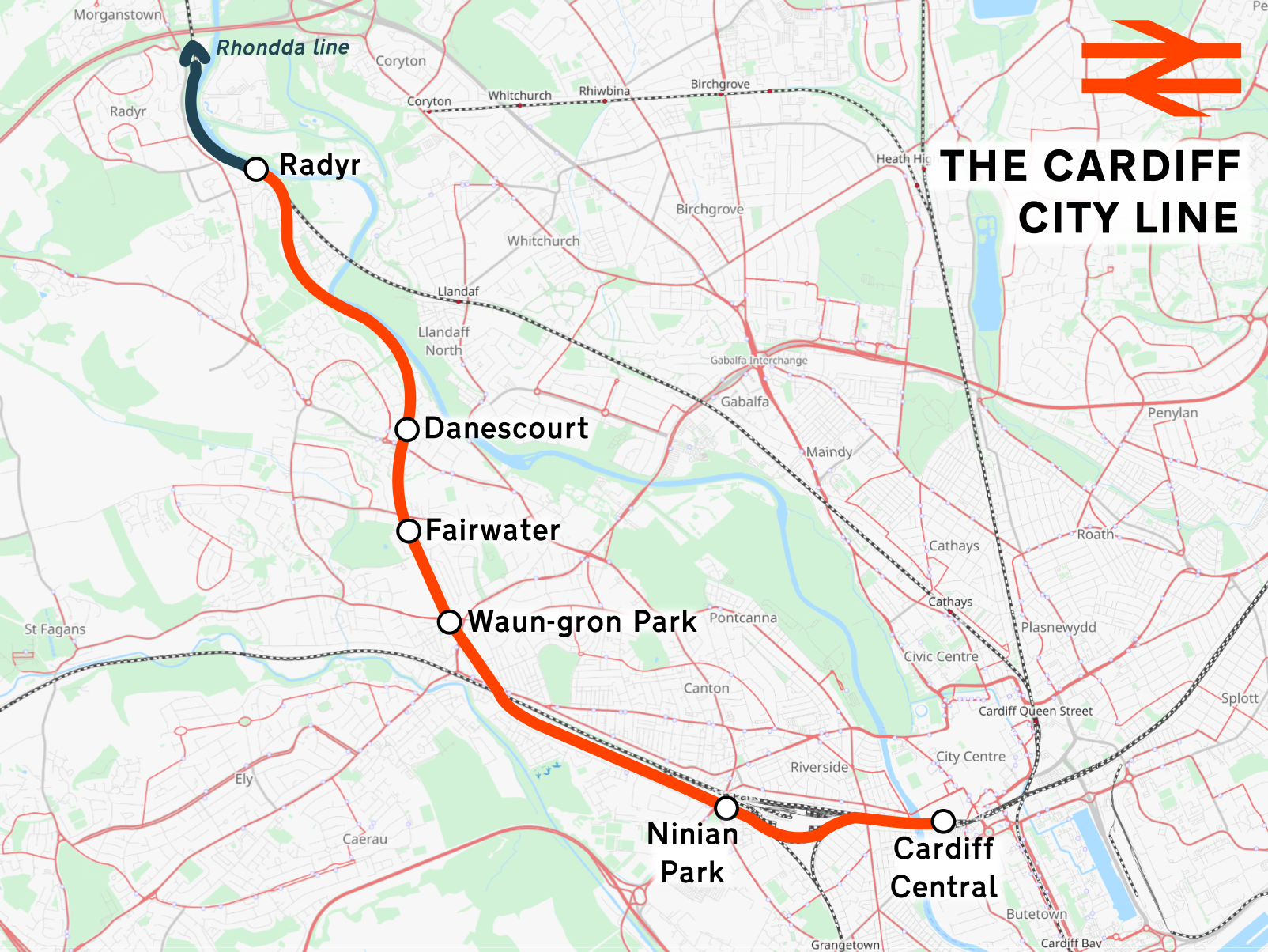
(Click to expand)

The Cardiff City Line is a suburban rail line in Cardiff that runs between Radyr and Cardiff Central via Fairwater.

== History ==
The line was opened by the Taff Vale Railway in 1859, as part of its route from Radyr to the docks at Penarth. Subsequent construction by the TVR added links to Cardiff Central and to the Penarth Extension Railway by 1878. Originally the line was freight-only, but over the years saw regular use for empty passenger trains thanks to its links with the depot at Cardiff Canton TMD and also for football specials to Ninian Park stadium and periodic engineering diversions.

The first regular passenger service was introduced to the line on 5 October 1987, when three new stations were opened at Waun-gron Park, Fairwater and Danescourt, and regular service was introduced to the previously existing Ninian Park station. The new service was introduced by British Rail in co-operation with the Mid Glamorgan and South Glamorgan County Councils.

== Services ==
Trains run every 30 minutes from Monday to Saturday, reducing to hourly services in the evenings. Since June 2024, these services have operated as loop services: trains from Merthyr Tydfil to Aberdare travel via Llandaf and Cardiff Queen Street before continuing from Cardiff Central via Ninian Park and Radyr to Aberdare. June 2024 also saw the introduction of an hourly Sunday service with Aberdare services starting at Cardiff Central.

Pre June 2024 city line services ran from Radyr to Coryton but these have been replaced by a Coryton to Penarth service.

Transport for Wales currently operates the line as part of the former Valley Lines network. TfW succeeded the previous franchisee Arriva Trains Wales in October 2018. Some freight services also use the line.

The line is also used as a diversionary route for trains serving Merthyr Tydfil, Aberdare and Treherbert when the line between Cardiff Queen Street and Radyr is closed for engineering work. In the past there were shuttle trains on the line to serve Pontypridd and beyond with one stop at Ninian Park.

== Trains ==
TfW operates the line with diesel multiple units of classes 150, 231 and bi-mode multiple units of class 756.

== Electrification ==
On 16 July 2012 the Department for Transport announced plans to electrify the line. This will require new electric multiple unit trains and should reduce journey times, operating costs and maintenance costs. Work was expected to start between 2014 and 2019, but was pushed back to between 2019 and 2024.

The announcement was made as an extension of the electrification of the South Wales Main Line from Cardiff Central to Swansea and the electrification of the south Wales Valley Lines at a total cost of £350 million. This in turn is part of a £9.4 billion investment in railways in England and Wales.

However, these plans have since been replaced by Welsh Government's South Wales Metro. This line has been partially taken over, and is now being electrified.

== See also ==
- List of railway stations in Cardiff
