= Leckwith =

Coordinates: 51.46°N 3.21°W

Leckwith: Welsh: Lecwydd
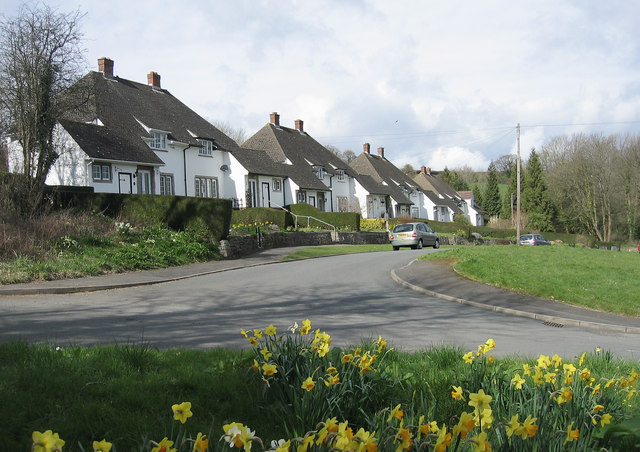
- The Green, Leckwith

- Location within the Vale of Glamorgan
- Principal area: Vale of Glamorgan
- Preserved county: South Glamorgan
- Country: Wales
- Sovereign state: United Kingdom
- Post town: CARDIFF
- Postcode district: CF11
- Dialling code: +44-29
- Police: South Wales
- Fire: South Wales
- Ambulance: Welsh
- UK Parliament: Vale of Glamorgan
- Senedd Cymru – Welsh Parliament: Vale of Glamorgan

Leckwith (Welsh: Lecwydd) is a small village in the Vale of Glamorgan, just west of Cardiff. Historically, the parish of Leckwith also included land on the east side of the river Ely that is now part of Cardiff itself. This area is also commonly known as Leckwith.

== Etymology ==
The name Leckwith is an anglicisation of the Welsh Lecwydd, with the common replacement of Welsh <-dd> by English <-th> (as in Gruffudd>Griffith). Lecwydd probably derives from the personal name Helygwydd (possibly the name of a local holy man or Welsh saint). The change from <-gw-> to <-cw-> may be compared to that in the personal name Tecwyn (<Tegwyn).

Since at least the nineteenth century Lecwydd sometimes appears in Welsh as Llechwydd or Llechwedd. These forms have been linked to the common Welsh noun llechwedd (hillside, slope), which has been taken to refer to Leckwith Woods, which rise up steeply from the river Ely. Linguistically, however, there is no relationship between Lecwydd and llechwedd, and the connection is probably a result of folk etymology. This explanation of the name Lecwydd is still sometimes seen, however.

== Landmarks ==
The old stone triple-arched Leckwith Bridge crosses the River Ely to the east. It is Grade II* listed and dates from before 1536. The historic church of St. James, rebuilt in the nineteenth century, like several others around Cardiff, was abandoned and fell into ruin in the second half of the twentieth century.

== Politics ==
Leckwith is part of the Michaelston-le-Pit and Leckwith community together with the neighbouring village of Michaelston-le-Pit. The two villages elect a community council.
