= Radyr railway station =

Railway station in Cardiff, Wales

Radyr Welsh: Radur
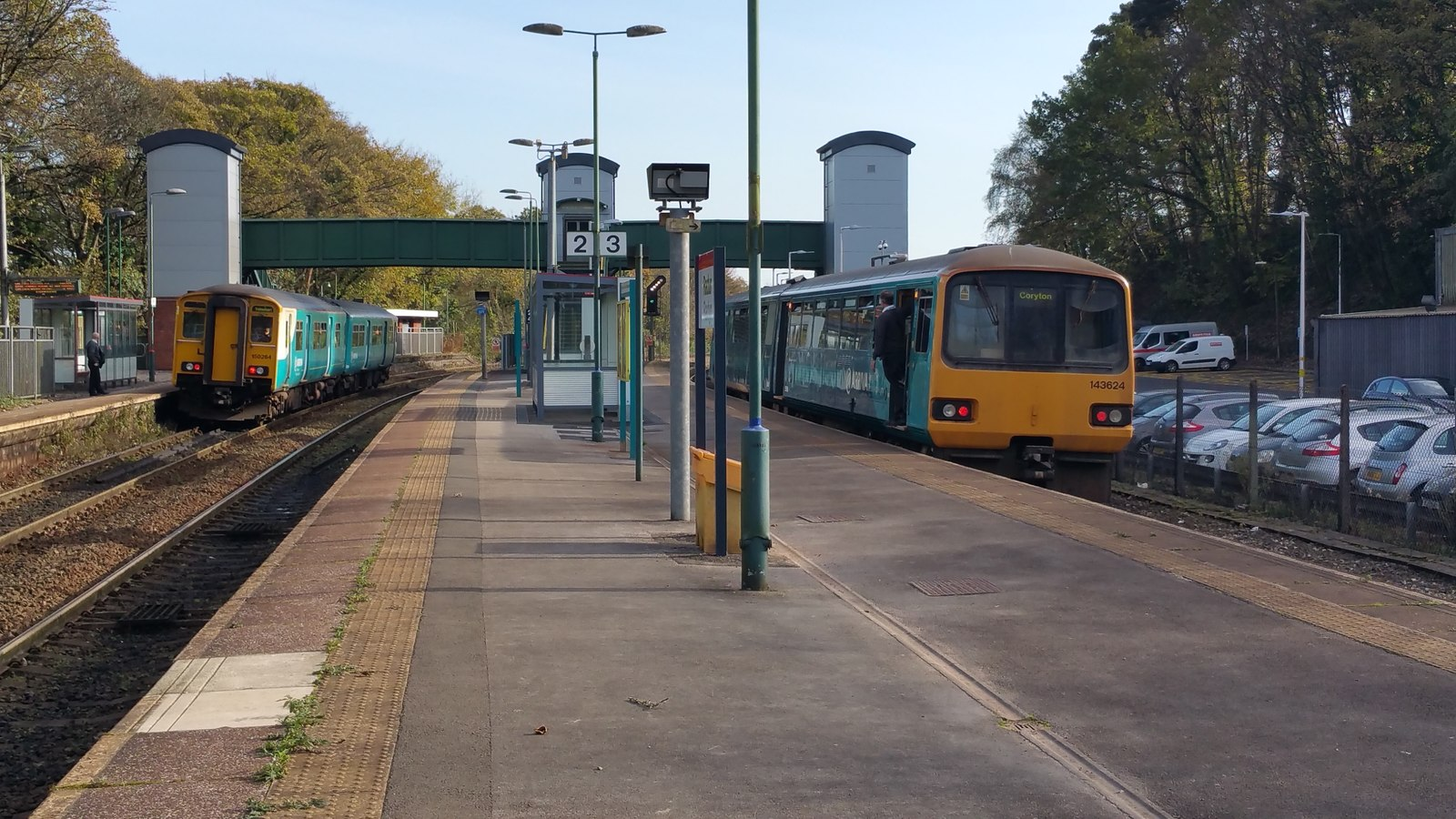

General information
- Location: Radyr, Cardiff; Wales
- Coordinates: 51°30′59.74″N 03°14′57″W
- Grid reference: ST134804
- Manager: Transport for Wales
- Platforms: 3

Other information
- Station code: RDR
- Classification: DfT category E

History
- Opened: June 1883

Passengers
- 2020/21: ▼71,560
- Interchange: ▼4,140
- 2021/22: ▲0.245 million
- Interchange: ▲16,121
- 2022/23: ▲0.332 million
- Interchange: ▲19,865
- 2023/24: ▲0.372 million
- Interchange: ▲21,397
- 2024/25: ▲0.450 million
- Interchange: ▲67,009
Location
Notes
- Passenger statistics from the Office of Rail and Road

Radyr railway station is a railway station serving the Radyr area of Cardiff, South Wales. It is at the foot of the hill at the eastern edge of the village, alongside the River Taff and adjacent to the Taff Trail. The station is on the Merthyr Line, and is also the northern terminus of the City Line.

== History ==
Radyr was originally a major railway junction and the location of sidings forming a marshalling yard for freight trains used in the industries in the Glamorgan valleys. It was first opened by the Taff Vale Railway in June 1883, and was originally named Penarth Junction. At one time there were four running lines through the station, up and down passenger and up and down goods on the Taff Vale main line to the valleys northwards and via Llandaff to Cardiff and the docks to the south east. Immediately south of the station, the Cardiff City line diverged southwards and reached the east side of Cardiff via Waterhall Junction, en route to the harbour at Penarth. The marshalling yard was south of the station in the fork between the running lines.

Following the down-turn in coal traffic; the marshalling yard closed (in 1993) and the sidings were greatly rationalised, becoming a permanent way depot. The platforms were also rationalised, from five to two, one up and one down.

== Redevelopment ==
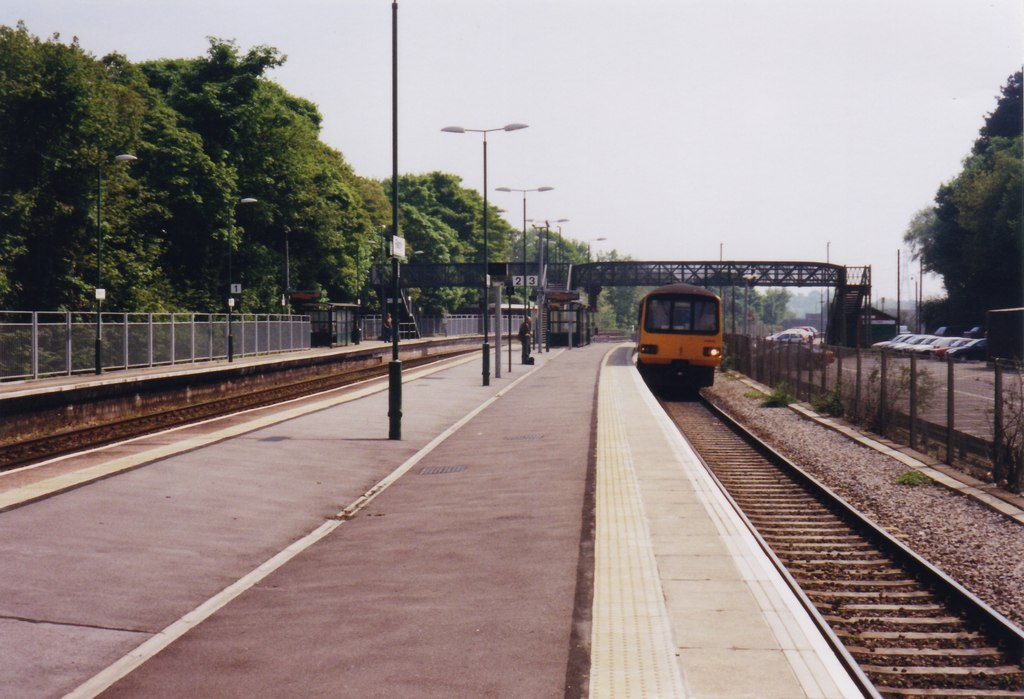
Radyr railway station in May 2000

In 1987 passenger services were introduced on the City Line by British Rail. This made Radyr a bottleneck, as the terminating trains coming from that line occupied the down platform and delays along the line to the Valleys were inevitable. It also allowed diversions for through trains which was beneficial.

Redesigned as a commuter station in 1998, major renovations took place, resulting in the two freight lines being replaced by a third platform, eliminating the problem of congestion. Also, a new ticket office was built and modern shelters replaced the old waiting area. These renovations coincided with the upgrades along the Taff Main Line, where most of the track was replaced between Cardiff and Pontypridd, and the old-fashioned semaphore signals were replaced with modern, colour light signals worked from a new panel box here (this supervises the Rhondda Line all the way to Treherbert).

These renovations allowed the last of the old sidings to be removed, redeveloped for parking and as a housing development.

== Present ==
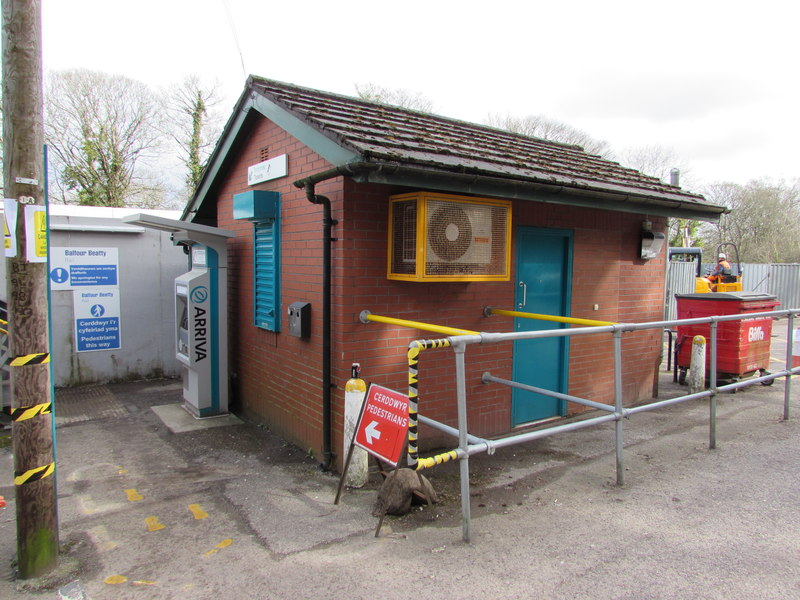
Ticket office and machine (2015)

Today the station, operated by Transport for Wales, has three platforms. Radyr has eight northbound services per hour, with a half hourly service to each of Treherbert, Aberdare, Pontypridd and Merthyr Tydfil. There are six southbound services per hour to Cardiff Central and another two southbound services to Cardiff Bay, two heading along the City Line that continue to Cardiff Central and six going via Cathays, with four terminating at Cardiff Central and two terminating at Cardiff Bay. Platform 1 is used for Cardiff Central and Cardiff Bay services via Cathays, platform 2 is used for those to City Line services and platform 3 for Pontypridd, Aberdare, Merthyr Tydfil and Treherbert services.

Extensive upgrading and modernisation works were completed in late 2017 by Network Rail as part of the Metro project which included improved access to all platforms by a new footbridge. A larger car park has also been provided to supplement the original which provides much better facilities including good lighting. Wheelchair access is now provided to all platforms via lifts.

The ticket office is staffed in peak morning hours. Travel time into Cardiff Central is 15 minutes on all lines.

In July 2007, members of the Radyr Comprehensive Green Flag Committee formally adopted the station and now frequently check that the station is clean and that all amenities are working. This link ties in with a community response to ensure that railway crime is stamped out.

== Services ==
In Monday-Saturday daytimes, there are usually eight trains an hour from Cardiff Central to destinations including Pontypridd, Treherbert, Merthyr Tydfil and Aberdare. There are eight trains an hour to Cardiff Central (two via Ninian Park) with some trains continuing beyond Cardiff to Barry Island, Bridgend (via the Vale of Glamorgan line) and Coryton (via the City line).

A reduced service operates on Sundays, with no trains on the City line.

After the June 2024 timetable change, there are eight trains an hour from Cardiff Central to destinations including Pontypridd, Treherbert, Merthyr Tydfil and Aberdare. The trains that runs from Aberdare will travel to Cardiff Central via the City Line. Two trains per hour from Pontypridd will continue to Cardiff Bay. The rest of the trains continue to Cardiff Central. On Sundays, there are four trains per hour, with one train service continues via the city Line.

Trains no longer run to/from Coryton after the June 2024 timetable change. Barry Island, Bridgend services no longer run to/from Merthyr and Aberdare as they now run services to/from Rhymney and Bargoed.

Preceding station	National Rail	Following station
Danescourt	Transport for Wales; City Line	Taffs Well
Llandaf	Transport for Wales; Merthyr line	Taffs Well
Llandaf	Transport for Wales; Rhondda line	Taffs Well

== See also ==
- List of railway stations in Cardiff
