= Cardiff Central railway station =

Principal grade II listed railway station in Cardiff, Wales

Cardiff Central Welsh: Caerdydd Canolog
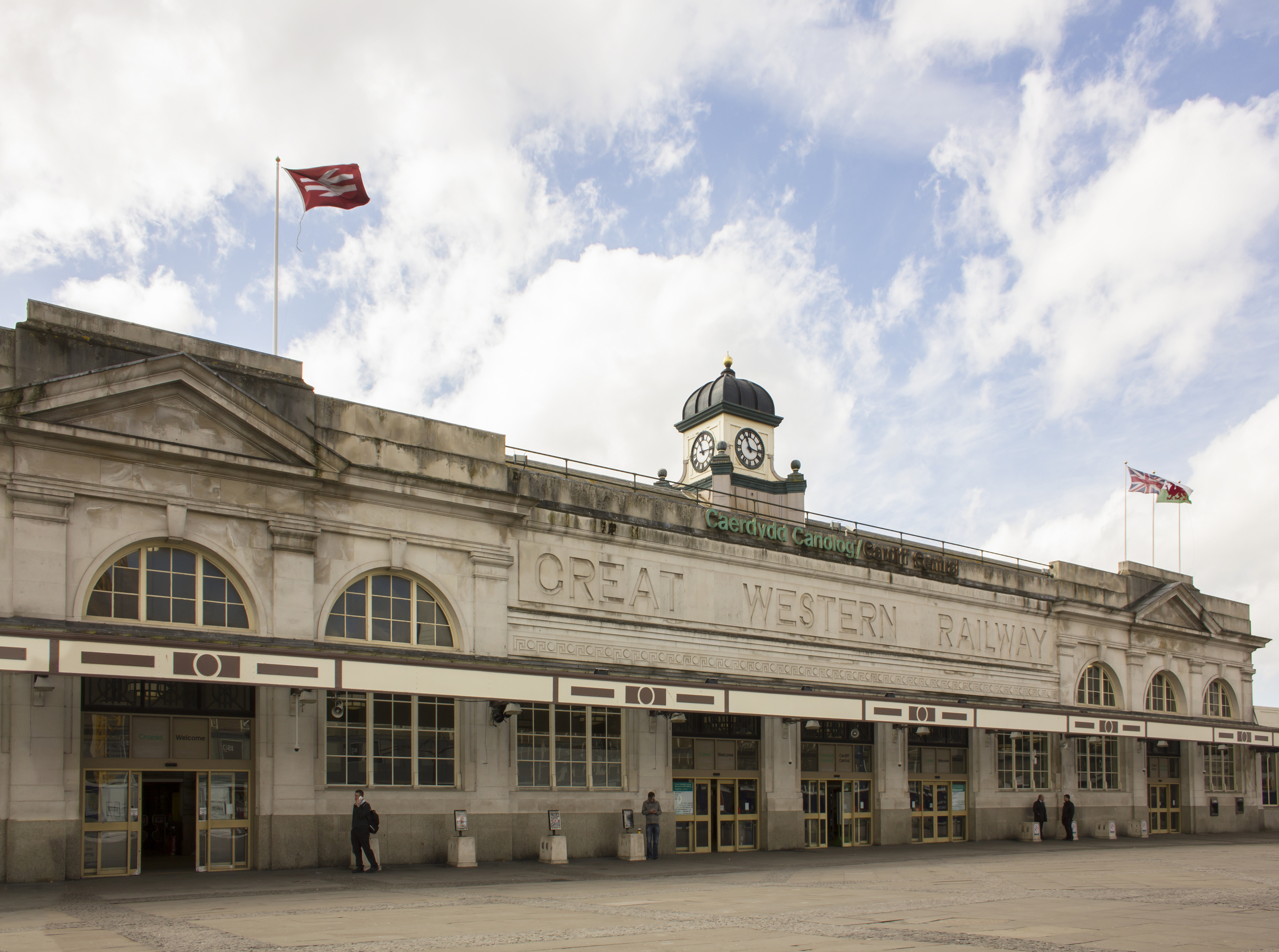
- The 1930s frontage of the station's northern entrance

General information
- Location: Cardiff, City and County of Cardiff, Wales
- Coordinates: 51.4755°N 3.1780°W
- Grid reference: ST181758
- Owner: Network Rail
- Manager: Transport for Wales
- Platforms: 8 (numbered 0-4 and 6-8)

Other information
- Station code: CDF
- Classification: DfT category A

Key dates
- 19 June 1850: Opened as Cardiff
- 1896: Enlarged
- 1924: Renamed Cardiff General
- 1931–34: Rebuilt
- 1940: Merged with Cardiff Riverside station
- 1964: Riverside platforms closed
- 1973: Renamed Cardiff Central
- 2015–17: Enlarged

Passengers
- 2021/22: ▲7.463 million
- Interchange: ▲0.782 million
- 2022/23: ▲10.185 million
- Interchange: ▲1.132 million
- 2023/24: ▲11.499 million
- Interchange: ▲1.388 million
- 2024/25: ▲12.514 million
- Interchange: ▲1.779 million
- 2025/26: ▲12.902 million
- Interchange: ▼1.766 million
Location
Notes
- Passenger statistics from the Office of Rail and Road

Cardiff Central (Welsh: Caerdydd Canolog) is a principal railway station on the South Wales Main Line, which serves the city of Cardiff, the capital of Wales. It lies 144 miles 77 chains (233 km) down the line from London Paddington via Bristol Parkway or 170 miles 30 chains (274 km) when measured via Stroud. It is one of the city's two urban railway hubs, along with Cardiff Queen Street. Opened in 1850 as Cardiff station, it was renamed Cardiff General in 1924 and then Cardiff Central in 1973.

The station is sited at Central Square, in Cardiff city centre. The Grade II listed building is managed by Transport for Wales, and is both the largest and busiest station in Wales. Cardiff Central is one of twenty railway stations in the city and one of two in the city centre, serving as a hub for the Valleys & Cardiff Local Routes. It is an interchange for services between South Wales, West Wales and North Wales, as well as other major British cities.

== History ==
=== Early history ===
In the early 1840s, the South Wales Railway was trying to find a suitable site for a railway station, but the area that is now Cardiff Central was prone to flooding. It was Isambard Kingdom Brunel's solution to divert the River Taff to the west, creating a larger and safer site for the station. The initial part of the South Wales Railway between Chepstow and Swansea through Cardiff was opened on 18 June 1850, with all trains operated by the Great Western Railway (GWR) under a lease agreement. Through services from Cardiff to London Paddington began on 19 July 1852, when the Chepstow Railway Bridge was opened, completing the connection between the South Wales Railway and the Great Western Railway. The South Wales Railway was absorbed into the GWR in 1863.

The South Wales Railway had originally been built as a broad-gauge railway but, on the weekend of 11–12 May 1872, the entire South Wales system was converted to standard gauge.

Cardiff to London trains originally ran via the circuitous route via Gloucester and took an average of five hours. This was reduced to around four hours from 1886, when the Severn Tunnel was opened creating a shorter route via Bristol Temple Meads and Bath Spa. In 1903, another short cut, the Badminton railway line was opened, bypassing Bath and Bristol, and this reduced the Cardiff-London journey times by another hour. By the 1930s, the fastest Cardiff-London trains took around 2 hours 40 minutes; this remained fairly static until 1961, when the diesel Blue Pullman service reduced the fastest journey time to 2 hours 7 minutes. In October 1976, the InterCity 125 trains were introduced, reducing the fastest journey times to 1 hour 53 minutes.

The original Cardiff station, as it was then known, had four through tracks running through the site, and consisted of two through platforms each with its own bay platform. During the 1890s, the station underwent considerable expansion; in 1896, a flying junction was constructed connecting the station to nearby Cardiff Queen Street and extra platforms were added to accommodate the new Taff Vale services, bringing the total number up to six.

The station was renamed Cardiff General in July 1924 and then Cardiff Central by British Rail in May 1973.

=== 1930s rebuild ===
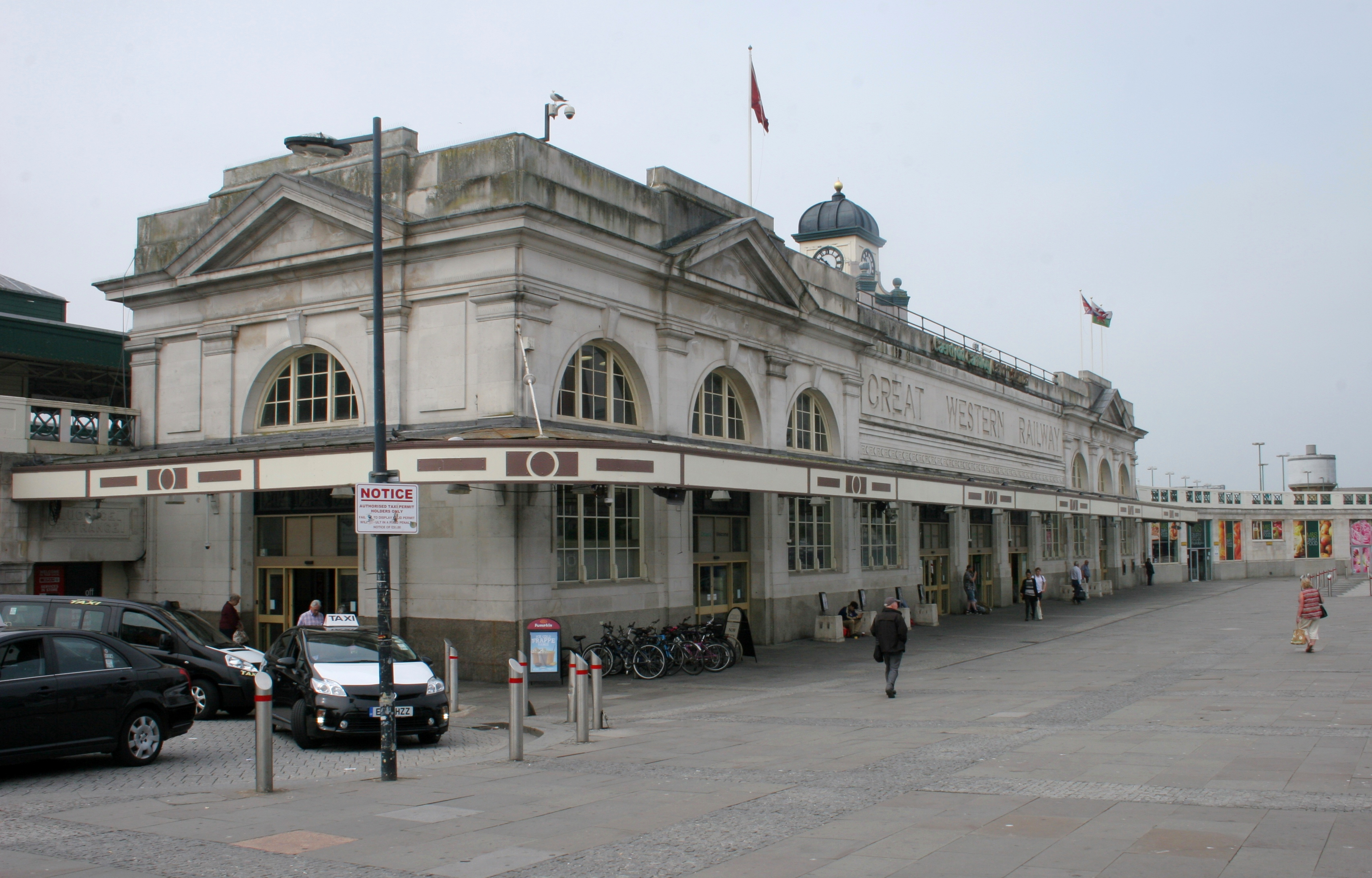
Exterior of main building

Between 1931 and 1934, the station underwent a major rebuild, designed by the GWR's architects department under their chief architect Percy Emerson Culverhouse. The centrepiece of this was a new Art Deco entrance building, faced in Portland stone, containing a booking hall and concourse with noted light fittings, all topped by a clock cupola. The current Art Deco lamps in the booking hall are replicas of the originals, installed in 1999, having been funded by the Railway Heritage Trust. A GWR war memorial is located at the eastern end of the concourse.

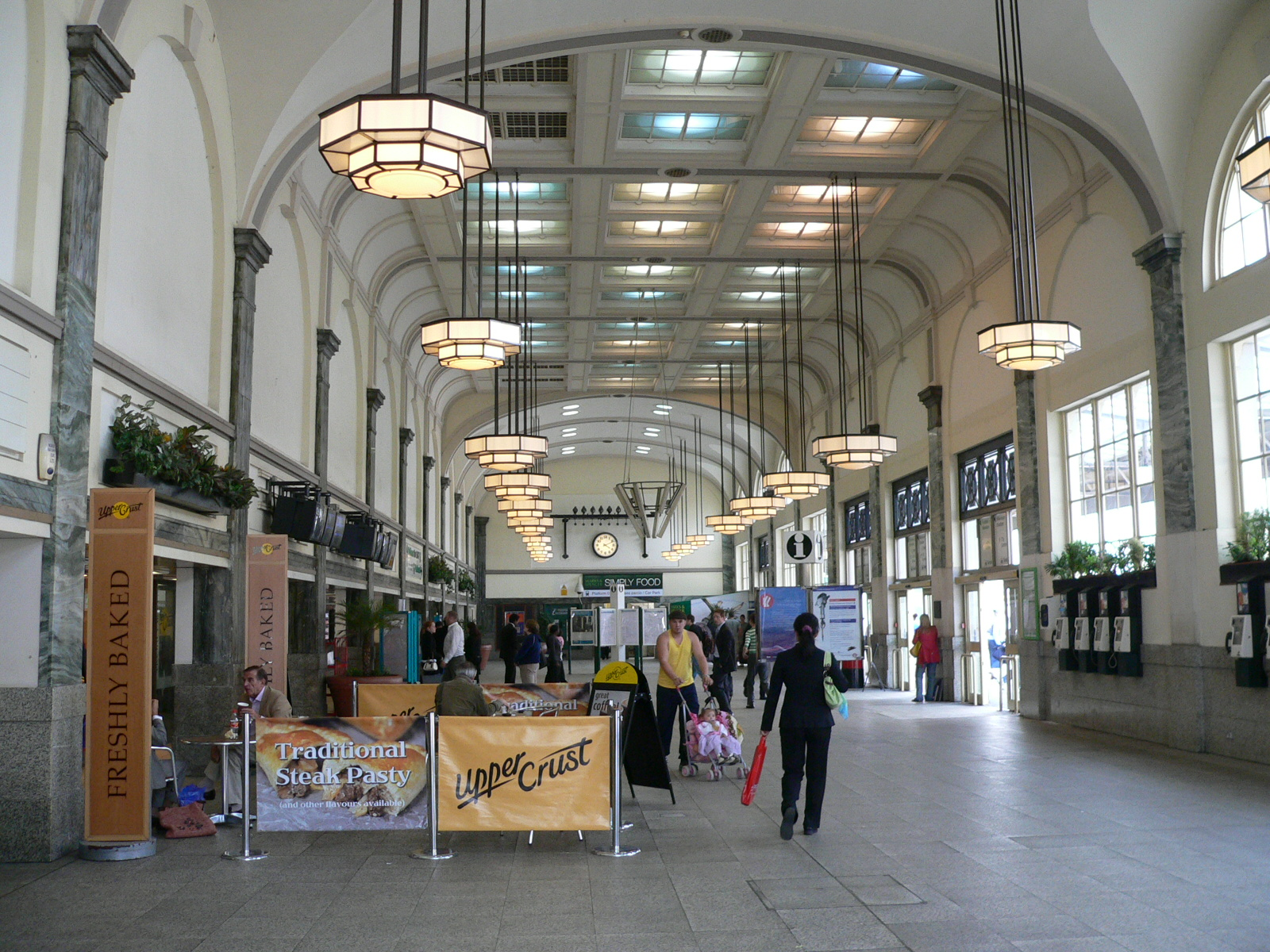
The interior of the concourse

The Great Western Railway has its full name carved on to the façade (larger than the name of the station). The rebuild also saw a number of other improvements including the lengthening of the platforms, the widening of the Taff River railway bridge to allow the approach lines to the station to be quadrupled, and the installation of colour-light signalling. The rebuild of the station cost the GWR £820,000 (equivalent to £50,740,000 in 2025), and was formally opened by the Minister of Transport Oliver Stanley on 26 February 1934.

In July 1934, the GWR began a pioneering diesel railcar service with a buffet between Cardiff General and Birmingham Snow Hill, which had only two stops at Newport and Gloucester. This was the first long-distance diesel express service in Britain, covering the 117.5 miles (189.1 km) between Cardiff and Birmingham in 2 hours 20 minutes. It proved so successful that larger railcars, with more seating and no buffet, had to be introduced to cope with demand; even this had to be augmented by a normal locomotive-hauled service. During the Second World War, two such trains ran to and from Cardiff daily. At this time, this was a three-car train consisting of a standard carriage sandwiched between two railcars, with a stop at Stratford-upon-Avon.

As a result of representations by the GWR, a nearby working-class district, Temperance Town, was cleared during the late 1930s in order to improve the outlook of the rebuilt station.

In 1992, the station, its buildings and platforms became Grade II listed.

=== Cardiff Riverside ===
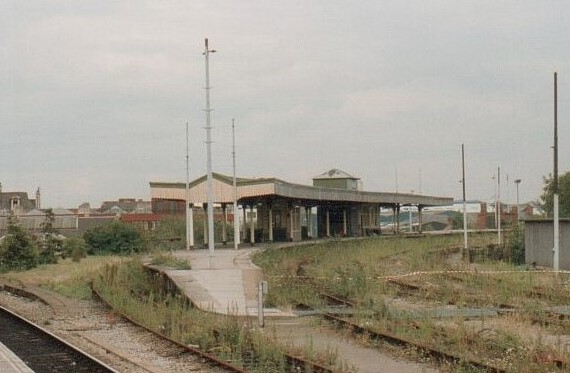
Cardiff Riverside station in 1993, shortly before its demolition

On 14 August 1893, the GWR opened the adjacent Cardiff Riverside, which had two platforms located to the south of and adjacent to the main Cardiff station, which curved away to the south on the Cardiff Riverside Branch, and ran to its terminus at Clarence Road about 1 mile (1.6 km) to the south. Riverside station was rebuilt as an island platform with two platform faces in the early 1930s, at the same time as Cardiff General was being rebuilt. On 28 October 1940, Riverside was formally incorporated into Cardiff General, with its platforms being designated 8 and 9. The Riverside platforms were closed for passenger use on 16 March 1964, but they continued to be used for parcels and newspaper traffic for a number of years after. They were demolished in 1994, after becoming disused.

=== 21st century developments ===
==== Electrification ====
In June 2010, Network Rail began its £5 billion Great Western electrification project, which promised the construction of overhead line equipment, station improvements, and resignalling along parts of the Great Western Main Line and the South Wales Main Line. The changes would see the retirement of InterCity 125 trains on London services and the introduction of Hitachi-designed electric multiple units, under a side project named the Intercity Express Programme.

Plans to install overhead equipment as far as Swansea were withdrawn in 2017, when the Department for Transport announced it would no longer fund the Cardiff-Swansea project, ordering Class 800 bi-mode trains instead which switch to diesel when departing Cardiff for west Wales.

Electrification to Cardiff was to be completed by 2018 but, later that year, Network Rail announced that completion would be delayed a further year.

The first electric services began at Cardiff Central on 5 January 2020, starting with a single five-car Class 800 unit forming the 08:50 to Paddington. Trains were initially unable to operate on electric power through the Severn Tunnel, due to difficult operating conditions in the 133-year-old tunnel, but the service was fully electrified by June 2020.

==== Station improvements ====
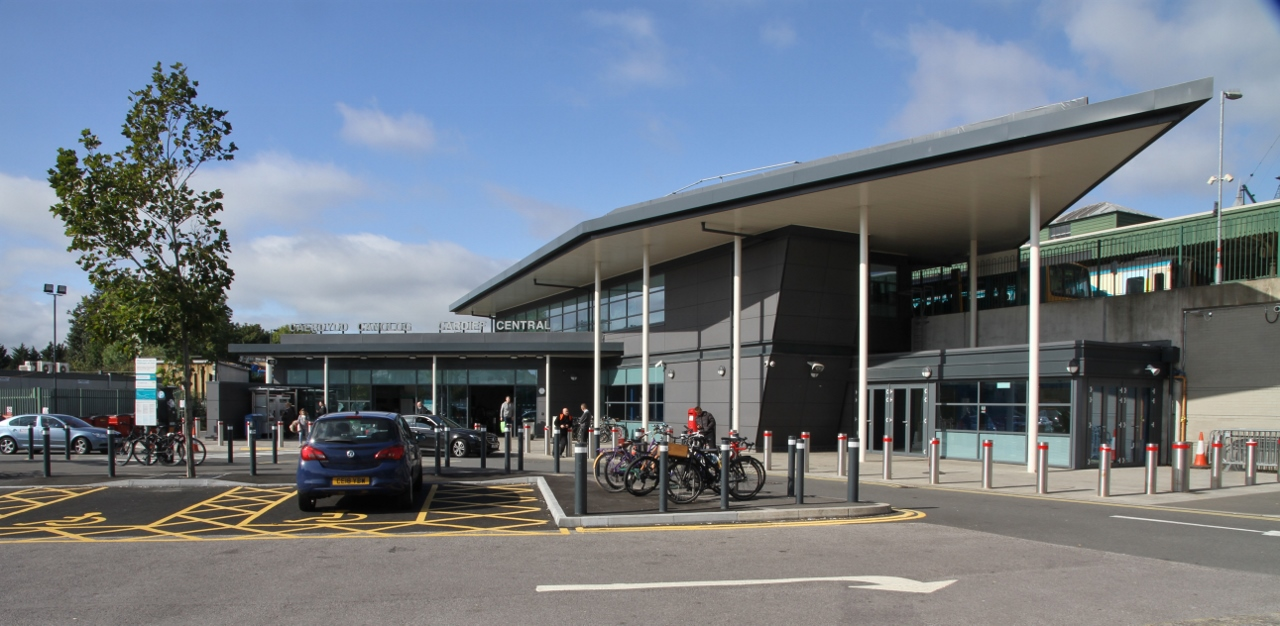
The new southern entrance and booking hall, opened in 2015

In 2011, it was announced that Cardiff Central would be enhanced with a new platform (number 8) and a new two-storey southern entrance and booking hall. This was part of a £200m regeneration scheme to boost train capacity in Cardiff and the surrounding areas. With work planned to start from June 2014, the Welsh Government committed £7m for the overall programme.

The old Grade II listed Water Tower, sited next to platform 0 and the River Taff, was repainted in 2012 in the original brown and beige colours of the Great Western Railway.

The new entrance, on the south side of the station, was opened in September 2015 and the new platform 8 on the south side of the station opened in January 2017; this allowed the number of trains on the busy Central to Queen Street corridor to be increased from 12 to 16 per hour. This coincided with a resignalling scheme in the station, which saw all of the platforms signalled to become bi-directional, in order to increase the flexibility of operations.

==== Central Square ====
A major redevelopment scheme of Central Square began in 2015, in front of the main station entrance which Network Rail part-owned. 500,000 square feet (46,000 m^{2}) of new office space was planned for the area formerly occupied by Cardiff Central bus station. The landscaping, designed to create a positive impression to visitors exiting the railway station, would include a major pedestrianised route between the railway station and the Millennium Stadium.

==== Future proposals ====
An artist's impression of the proposed station upgrade

In 2015, plans were unveiled to substantially redevelop the station in order to cope with the expected rise in passenger numbers, which are projected to rise from the current 13 million to 32 million by 2043. The proposed redevelopment would see an enlarged glass-fronted concourse, which would leave the current 1930s façade intact.

In July 2019, it was announced that significant upgrades would take place at Cardiff Central in a £38m improvement project, which also proposed a £20m West Wales Parkway north of Swansea in order to reduce journey times between Cardiff and West Wales. Design work had already begun on a £113m upgrade by 2020, which was expected to be funded by £40m from the Cardiff Capital Region group of local authorities, £15m from Transport for Wales and from the UK's Department for Transport. It wzs envisaged that work would begin in 2022, but that would depend upon the design and development exercise.

In September 2024, it was proposed that the station would gain an additional two platforms as part of Cardiff Crossrail, a project planned to cross the city west-to-east via Cardiff Bay. The first phase of this project would see Central station connected to the Butetown branch line, with tram-trains running to Cardiff Bay. The two new platforms would be built in the southern car park. Construction of the main phase of works started in July 2026 and is expected to be completed in 2029.

== Layout ==
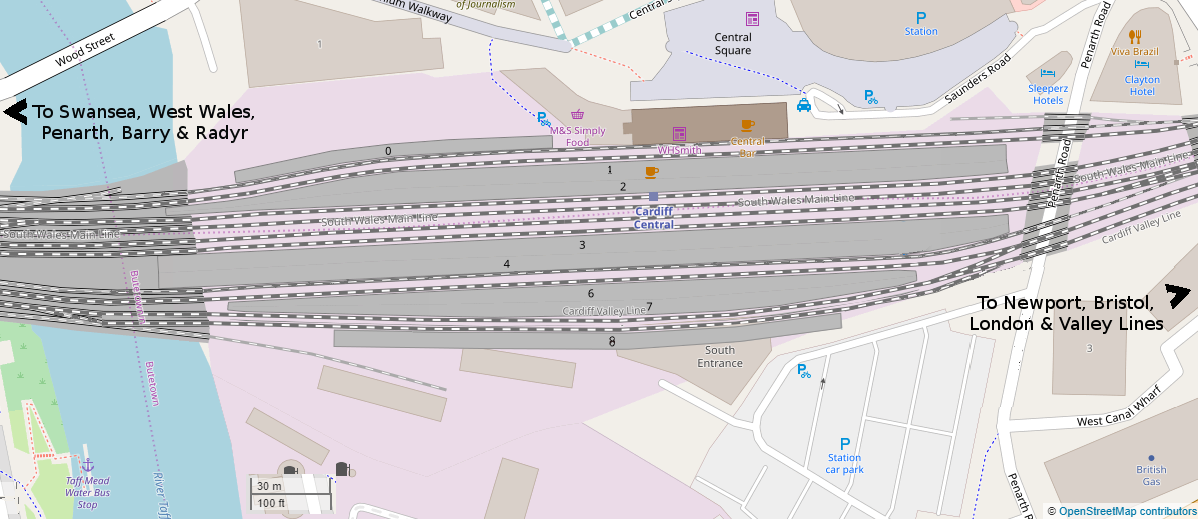
Layout plan of Cardiff Central

There are two entrances to the station:

- the northern main entrance leads to the main concourse and is on Central Square. The Millennium Stadium lies a short distance to the north-west.
- the southern entrance is at the rear of the station on Tresillian Way, accessed from Penarth Road, where the station car park is found.

The railway lines are above the station concourses. Two subways, one each at the eastern and western side of the station, run parallel under the tracks linking the two main entrances, from which the platforms are accessed by stairs and lifts. The exception is platform 0, which is accessed from the main concourse near the Marks and Spencer shop.

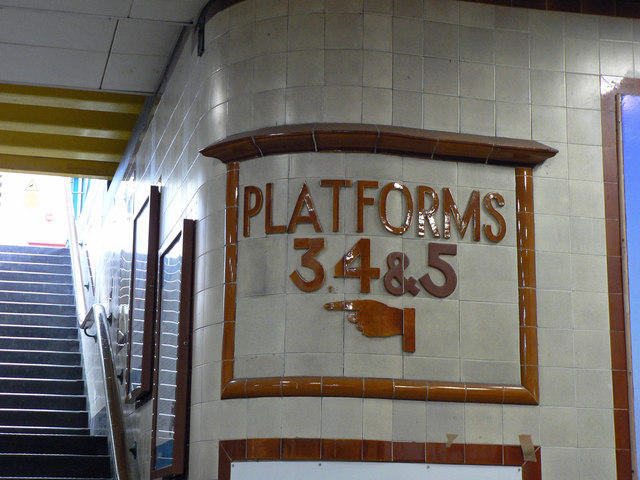
1930s signage to platforms, indicating the now non-existent platform 5

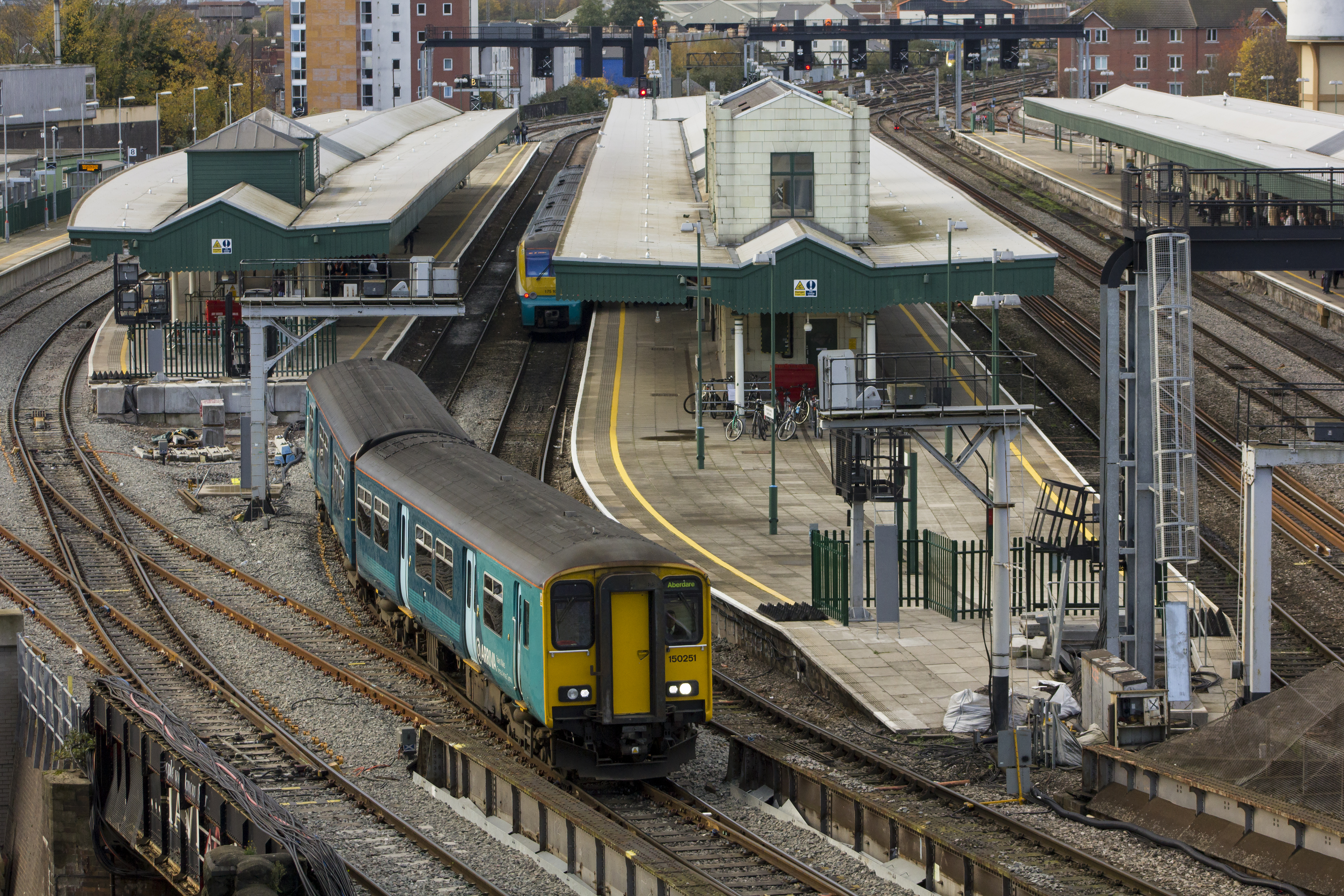
Platforms 8–2, seen from the east

The station has eight platforms, numbered: 0, 1a/b, 2a/b, 3a/b, 4a/b, 6a/b, 7a/b and 8. There is no longer a platform 5, despite signage; this was a west-facing bay platform situated between 3 and 4, which was removed in the 1960s. (Note: Potential reinstatement of this platform is mentioned on page 10 of Network Rail's route plan for the Valley Lines.) Platform 0, a short through platform at the north of the station, was created in 1999.

The station has ten tracks running through it. All but two have an adjacent platform and the remaining two are through lines, for goods trains and other non-stopping traffic.

Platforms 3 and 4 are divided into 'A' and 'B' sections and are capable of holding two local trains or a nine-car Class 800 train. Other platforms can be used by more than one train, but are not sectioned.

Platforms 6 to 8, at the south side of the station, are used by Valley Lines trains between Cardiff Queen Street, the north of the city, the Valleys and the Vale of Glamorgan.

Platforms 0 to 4 are typically used by longer-distance regional and national services operated by Transport for Wales, Great Western Railway and CrossCountry.

To the west of the station lies Canton Traction Maintenance Depot, operated by Transport for Wales Rail, as well as the junction splitting trains to Penarth and the Vale of Glamorgan, Swansea and Valley line services via Ninian Park and Radyr. To the east lies Cardiff Queen Street (for Cardiff local and Valley Line services) and the main line towards Newport, Bristol and London Paddington.

== Facilities ==
The majority of facilities are on the main concourse, including ticket desks and machines, cash machines, an information desk, departure and arrival screens, public telephones, a newsagent, and food shops. The station has the only first class waiting room in Wales. Outside, a pay and display car park provides 248 spaces.

Additional ticket barriers were installed in the main entrance of the station in November 2019, as part of plans to reduce congestion at the station at peak times. A study found that the station can see over 40,000 people use the station on major event days in the city. The work was funded by Transport for Wales, which also aimed to refurbish toilets, install more ticket machines, phone charging points and build bicycle storage in 2020. Cardiff Central's customer numbers are forecast to top 34 million users annually by 2043.

In January 2020, Transport for Wales installed a dedicated passenger assistance meeting point in the ticket hall of the station. It stated that it would provide a comfortable and identifiable location for those needing assistance to wait while their booked assistance is prepared, for example, the preparation of boarding aids.

British Transport Police maintains a presence at Cardiff Central.

== Services ==
Map of the south-east Wales rail network

Three train operating companies run the following services in trains per hour/day (tph/tpd):

Transport for Wales:

- Local commuter services on the Valleys & Cardiff Local Routes, the local urban rail network.
- Regional services predominantly within South Wales and West Wales to destinations including: Newport, Swansea, Ebbw Vale Town, Carmarthen, Milford Haven, Pembroke Dock, Maesteg and Cheltenham Spa via Chepstow, typically on an hourly or two-hourly frequency.
- 1 tph to Manchester Piccadilly, via Hereford, Shrewsbury and Crewe
- 1 tp2h to Holyhead, via Shrewsbury, Wrexham General, Chester and the North Wales Coast Line; of which:
  - 2 tpd on weekdays are premium services to Holyhead, known as the Premier Service
- Irregular boat trains to and from Fishguard Harbour, connecting with the Stena Line ferry to Rosslare Harbour in Ireland.

Great Western Railway:

- 2 tph to London Paddington, via Newport, Bristol Parkway, Swindon and Reading; of which:
- 1 tph to Swansea; of which:
  - 1 tp2h continues to Carmarthen
- 1 tph to Portsmouth Harbour, via Bristol Temple Meads
- 1 tph to Taunton, via Bristol Temple Meads; of which:
  - most continue to Exeter St Davids, Plymouth or Penzance.

CrossCountry:

- 1 tph to Nottingham, via Gloucester, Birmingham New Street and Derby
- 2 tpd to Birmingham New Street
- 1 tpd to Edinburgh Waverley.

Preceding station	National Rail	Following station
Cardiff Queen Street	Transport for Wales Rail; City Line	Ninian Park
Cardiff Queen Street	Transport for Wales Rail; Rhondda Line	Terminus
Cardiff Queen Street	Transport for Wales Rail; Rhymney Line or Merthyr Line	Grangetown
Cardiff Queen Street	Transport for Wales Rail; Vale Line	Grangetown
Pye Corner	Transport for Wales Rail; Ebbw Valley Railway	Terminus
Newport	Transport for Wales Rail; Maesteg Line	Pontyclun
Newport	Transport for Wales Rail; Welsh Marches Line	Terminus
Newport	Transport for Wales Rail; South Wales Main Line	Bridgend
Terminus	Transport for Wales Rail; Swanline	Bridgend
Newport	CrossCountry; Cardiff Central–Birmingham–Derby–Nottingham	Terminus
Newport	Great Western Railway; London Paddington–Swansea	Terminus or Bridgend
Newport	Great Western Railway; Portsmouth Harbour–Cardiff Central	Terminus
Newport	Great Western Railway; Penzance–Taunton–Cardiff Central	Terminus
	Future services	
Newport	Lumo; London–Carmarthen	Gowerton

== Incidents ==
On 4 May 1998, eleven wagons of a freight train, which was carrying iron ore from Port Talbot, derailed just east of the station. It caused substantial damage to the track, as well as blocking the main line into the station, resulting in disruption to services for several days. No-one was injured in the incident.

To the east of the platforms, the Valley Lines tracks rise up and cross over the South Wales Main Line using a bridge. Railway services were severely disrupted in August 2012, when the retaining wall between the tracks partially collapsed, spilling five tonnes of earth. The South Wales Main Line was swiftly reopened, but all services between Central and Queen Street were cancelled, with a replacement bus service operating. It was expected that repairs could take two weeks. There were worries that the bronze medal match in the 2012 Summer Olympics men's football competition, held at the nearby Millennium Stadium, could be disrupted, but most fans were due to arrive by the main line rather than the Valley Lines. There had been severe congestion at the station earlier in the month, due to another Olympic match.

In December 2016, a serious accident was narrowly averted by the alertness of a driver. During the Cardiff Area Resignalling Scheme, a set of points had been left in an unsafe condition and were undetectable by the signalling system. The Rail Accident Investigation Branch report into the incident revealed that lessons learned following the Clapham Junction rail crash in December 1988 appeared to have been forgotten. Excessive working hours and a lack of detailed planning were cited as contributory factors.

== See also ==
- List of railway stations in Wales
- Transport in Wales
- Commuter rail in the United Kingdom
- Rail transport in Cardiff
