= Energlyn & Churchill Park railway station =

Railway station in Caerphilly, Wales

Energlyn & Churchill Park Welsh: Eneu'r-glyn a Pharc Churchill
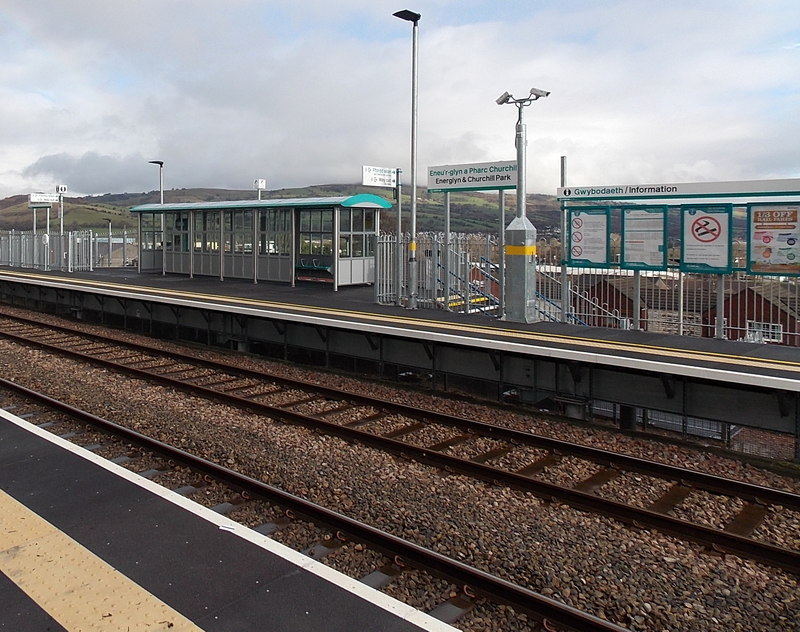

General information
- Location: Energlyn, Caerphilly; Wales
- Coordinates: 51.5838°N 3.2287°W
- Grid reference: ST149879
- Manager: Transport for Wales
- Platforms: 2

Other information
- Station code: ECP

Key dates
- 8 December 2013: Opened

Passengers
- 2021/22: ▲44,102
- 2022/23: ▲65,858
- 2023/24: ▲79,022
- 2024/25: ▲80,900
- 2025/26: ▼57,306
Location
Notes
- Passenger statistics from the Office of Rail and Road

Energlyn & Churchill Park railway station (Welsh: Eneu'r-glyn a Pharc Churchill) is a railway station in Caerphilly, Wales, on the Rhymney Line. The northbound platform is in the Energlyn suburb of Caerphilly, whilst the southbound platform is in Churchill Park. The station is between Llanbradach and Aber.

The first services from the station ran on 8 December 2013. The station was formally opened on 16 December 2013 by Edwina Hart, the Welsh Government Transport Minister.

== History ==
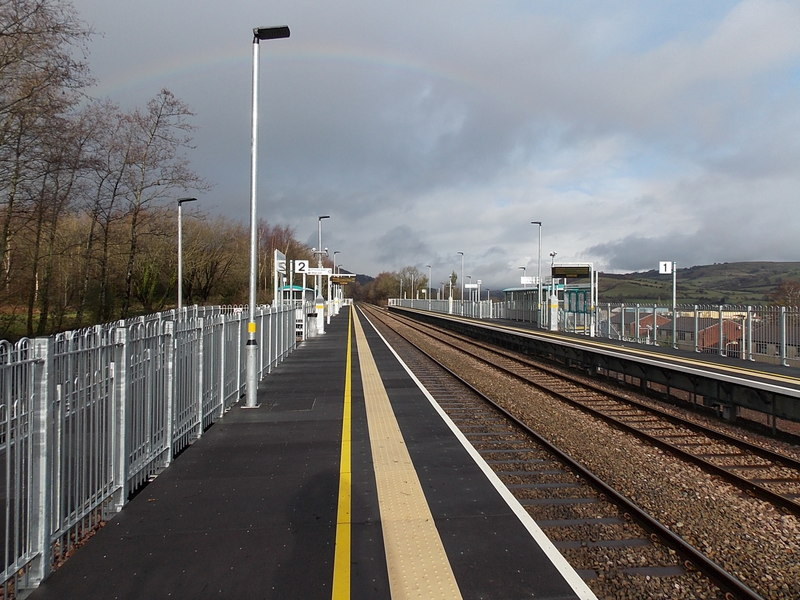
Platforms 1 (right) on the Churchill Park side and 2 (left) on the Energlyn side

The provision of a station on the Rhymney Line at Energlyn was raised in January 2001 when Sue Essex AM was reported to have instructed that £16 million should be set aside for works to improve capacity on the line, including a new station. The failure of Railtrack delayed the project, which was next mentioned in Network Rail's Wales Route Utilisation Strategy for Control Period 4 (2009-2014). The station was identified as a longer-term option to be undertaken beyond the Control Period as part of the Sewta strategy which also involved installing a passing loop at Tir-Phil, allowing an increased service on the Rhymney Line. The station would serve new housing around Energlyn and Churchill Park, as well as Pwllypant, Penyrheol, Abertridwr and Bedwas. The population in the area is large enough to warrant a station but it is thought unlikely that patronage on the Rhymney Line will dramatically increase, as many potential passengers already use neighbouring stations. The initial service provision was four trains an hour to and from Cardiff Queen Street and Cardiff Central.

In December 2008, Sewta submitted a £350 million five-year spending programme to the Welsh Government which included £38.7 million for works on the Rhymney Line, including Energlyn station. Plans for the station were put on hold when the works were not included in the Government's spending plans for 2011-2012, the reason given being the spending cuts imposed by the UK Coalition government. The project was, however, identified as a priority in the Welsh Government’s National Transport Plan in January 2012, with a projected completion date in 2015.

The design for the station was unveiled by Network Rail on 9 February 2012. It comprises two six-car length platforms with step-free access, parking for 17 cars including disabled spaces, a drop-off point, CCTV, waiting shelters, ticket machines, a bicycle storage area, emergency help points and train information displays. The design was developed jointly by the Welsh Assembly Government, Network Rail, Caerphilly County Borough Council, Sewta and Arriva Trains Wales. Provision of the new station was scheduled to cost £5.2 million. From opening to October 2018, it was operated by Arriva Trains Wales. Transport for Wales took over operation from October 2018.

== Construction ==
The station was built by a Colas Rail and Morgan Sindall joint venture.

== Services ==
In the December 2016 timetable, the basic daytime service remains two trains per hour each way, to Caerphilly, Cardiff Central & Penarth southbound and to Bargoed northbound. One per hour of the latter continues to Rhymney. This drops to hourly in the evening and two-hourly on Sundays. Increasing the frequency of services to four per hour in each direction has been proposed, but is not currently possible due to timetabling issues at Bargoed.

In the June 2024 timetable change, the train services will be continuing to Barry Island. The trains that are operating to/from Rhymney will not stop at this station apart from the Monday to Saturday evenings from 8pm and Sundays services. The trains that are operating to/from Bargoed will stop at this station.

Monday to Saturday services:

- 2tph from Bargoed to Barry Island

- 2tph from Barry Island to Bargoed

Sunday services:

- 1tph from Rhymney to Barry Island

- 1tph from Barry Island to Rhymney

Preceding station	National Rail	Following station
Aber	Transport for Wales; Rhymney Line	Llanbradach
