= Friars Point House =

Country house on Barry Island

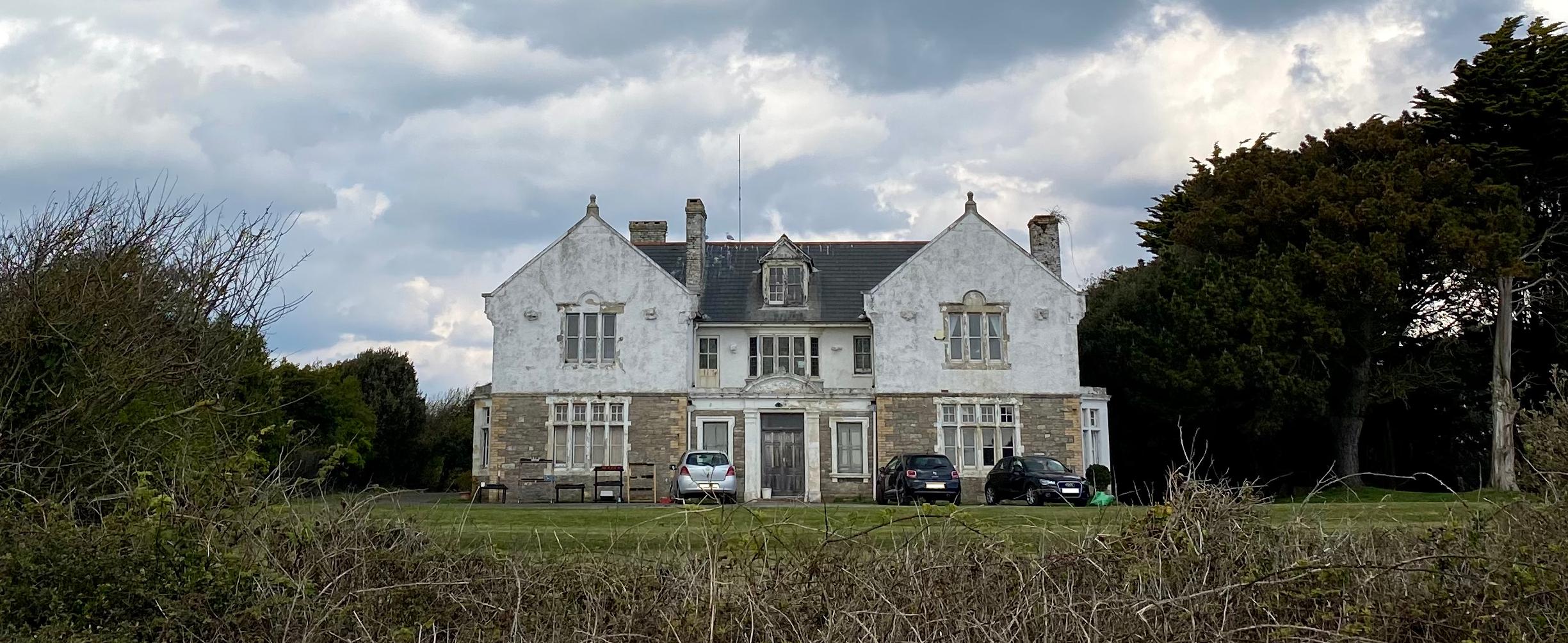
- Friars Point House in 2021

General information
- Type: Country house
- Architectural style: Jacobethan
- Location: Barry Island, in the Vale of Glamorgan, Wales
- Completed: 1858
- Client: Francis Crawshay

Listed Building – Grade II
- Official name: Friars Point House
- Designated: 30 July 1991; 34 years ago
- Reference no.: 13455

Friars Point House (initially known as The Marine Hotel and later The Pier Hotel) is a Grade-II listed, 19th-century country house on Barry Island, in the Vale of Glamorgan, Wales.

== History ==
The house was built in 1858 by Francis Crawshay (1811–1878), ironmaster and son of William Crawshay II, for use as The Marine Hotel. Crawshay had bought Barry Island in 1856 with the intention of capitalising on the growing Victorian trend of the seaside resort. To do this, he arranged ferries from the mainland to the island, where "the more select Victorian visitor" could stay at the hotel. In 1873, the island was bought by J. Traherne, a coal magnate, who planned to integrate the expansion of Barry as a seaside resort with industrial development, proposing a new dock to satisfy the demands of the Welsh mineral trade. To meet his foreseen growth in visitors to the island, Traherne enlarged the hotel and built a steel pier off Friars Point (51.38615°N 3.27891°W) to facilitate day-trippers visiting Barry by pleasure craft; he also renamed it as The Pier Hotel. However, Traherne's plans for the expansion of Barry were halted following a short industrial depression in the 1870s, and in 1877 the island was sold to the Windsor Estate.

In 1894, the life tenant of the Windsor Estate, Lord Windsor (created Earl of Plymouth in 1905) embarked on a process of converting the hotel for use as a private residence and renamed it to Friars Point House. Owing to the Windsor Estate's interests in the industrial development of Penarth, all such rival development in Barry was stopped. For a time, Lord Windsor also prohibited visitors from the island in order to reserve the headlands for partridge and rabbit shooting. In around 1900, William Graham (1861–1932), an industrialist, remodelled the house, making extensive Art Nouveau alterations to the interior. In 1911, Graham made alterations to the grounds, and in 1912, he took up residence with his family. In 1928, a fire broke out in the library which caused some damage to a wall but was put out before any serious damage occurred. Sir William Graham (knighted in 1922) died at the house in April 1932. In July, the house with 13½-acres of land was offered for sale for £7,500, and in October the contents of the house were auctioned.

In 1937, the property was purchased by Western Enterprises Ltd., a property development firm. In 1939, a proposal by the firm was approved to convert the property into a holiday camp, which would include "the erection of 200 chalets in the grounds, the construction of tennis courts, putting greens, clock golf, children's playground and a swimming pool" which would converge on the house, with the house itself being used for dining and other recreation. It appears that no such development took place.

In the 1980s, it was reported that the house had been vacant for many years, but that it had been occasionally used as a set for television programmes and films. By 1987, the property was owned by the local council ("the finest council house in the borough") and leased to Frederick Wright, the chief shareholder of Majestic Holidays Ltd., the firm which had bought the then-derelict Butlin's Barry Island holiday camp earlier in the year. Throughout the rest of the 20th-century, various plans of development were proposed for the property, none of which came to fruition. In 1991 the property was designated as a Grade-II listed building.

As of 2008 and as recently as 2013, the property is owned by Mark Roberts, a businessman noted for his extensive purchase of manorial lordships in attempts to claim land. In 2008, he claimed that such a lordship was connected to Friars Point House and that this entitled him to part of the Friars Point coastline.

== Architecture ==
Friars Point House was built in 1858 by Francis Crawshay for use as a hotel. Following J. Traherne's acquisition in 1873, the hotel was enlarged. Under the ownership of the Windsor Estate and direction of Lord Windsor, Traherne's enlargements were demolished, and in around 1900 William Graham was employed to remodel the house for use as a private residence. Graham made improvements to the grounds in 1911. Cadw gives Graham's remodelling as being in "Arts and Crafts Jacobethan style", and the projecting stones either side of the main first storey windows as being "possibly re-used medieval corbels". The house is built of stone with rendering to the upper-half and yellow brick quoins to the ground floor. The interior, also subject to Graham's remodelling, features wainscoting throughout; the full-height wainscoting in the Dining Room is in the Art Nouveau style. The house was designated as a Grade-II listed building on 30 July 1991 as a "good, locally important example of a small country house of the period retaining a well-preserved interior". The entrance gates and gatehouse to the property were designated as Grade-II listed on the same date as being "of group value with Friars Point House and [each other]".
