= Llanbradach railway station =

Railway station in South Wales

Llanbradach
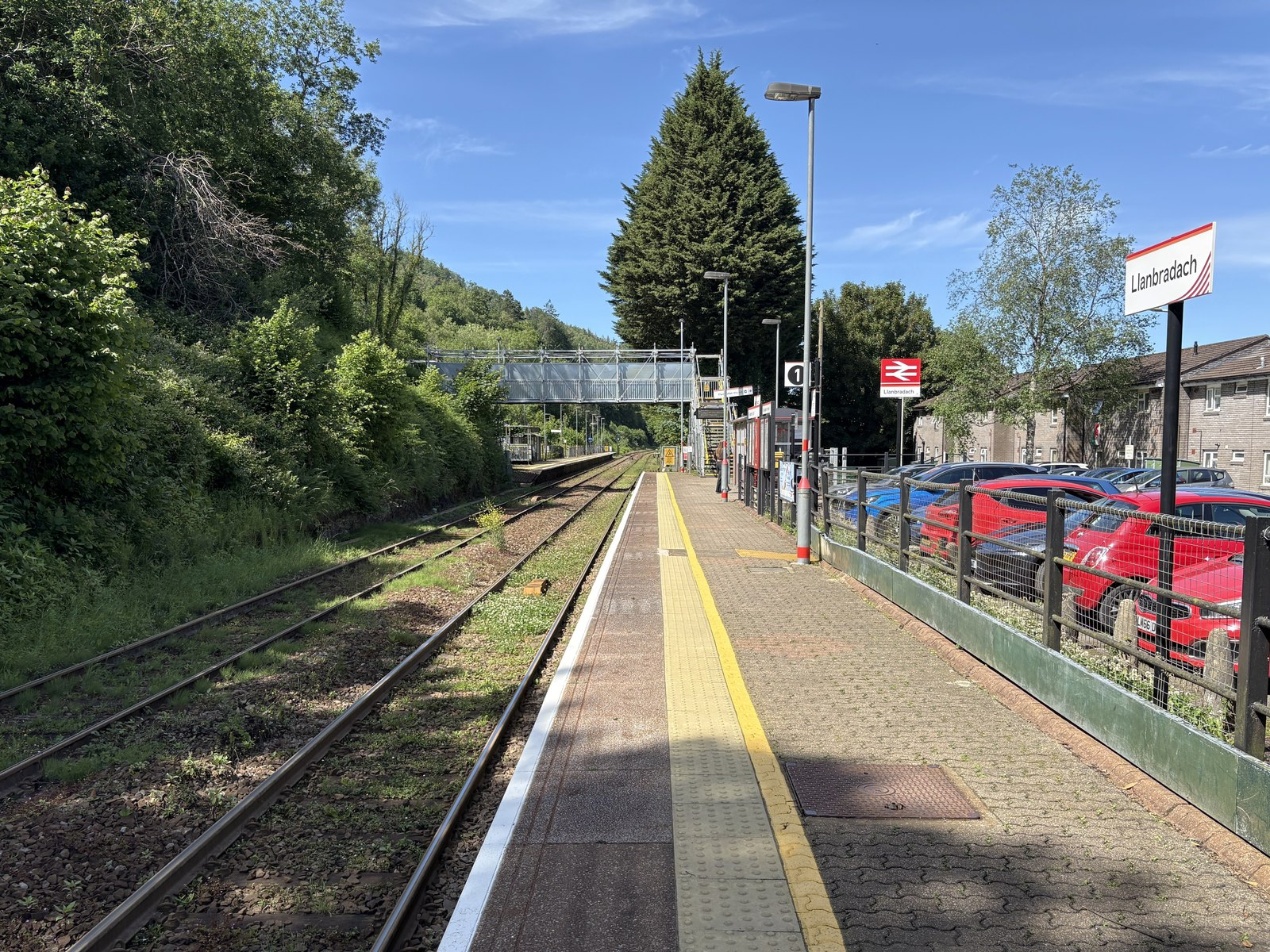

General information
- Location: Llanbradach, Caerphilly; Wales
- Coordinates: 51°36′11″N 3°13′59″W
- Grid reference: ST146900
- Manager: Transport for Wales
- Platforms: 2

Other information
- Station code: LNB
- Classification: DfT category F2

History
- Opened: 1893

Passengers
- 2021/22: ▲39,982
- 2022/23: ▲49,924
- 2023/24: ▲59,034
- 2024/25: ▲69,198
- 2025/26: ▼53,124
Location
Notes
- Passenger statistics from the Office of Rail and Road

Llanbradach railway station is a railway station serving the village of Llanbradach, south Wales. It is a stop on the Rhymney Line of the Valley Lines network.

== History ==
The railway line through here opened in 1858. Llanbradach station was opened on 1 March 1893 by the Rhymney Railway, replacing Pwllypant (Bradshaw's spelling) a short way to the south.

== Services ==
The Monday to Saturday daytime service pattern is four trains an hour southbound to Cardiff Central: three continue to Barry Island and one to Bridgend. Northbound four trains an hour run to Bargoed with two of those continuing to Rhymney. The frequency decreases in the evening.

On Sundays, the service pattern is one train an hour southbound to Cardiff Central and Barry Island, and one an hour northbound to Rhymney.

Preceding station	National Rail	Following station
Aber or Energlyn & Churchill Park	Transport for Wales; Rhymney Line	Ystrad Mynach
