= Abertridwr =

Abertridwr (Welsh pronunciation) may refer to:

- Abertridwr, Powys, Wales
- Abertridwr, Caerphilly, Wales
  - Abertridwr railway station
