= Welsh Open (darts) =

Tournament information
- Venue: Ebbw Vale (1974–1985); Butlin's Barry Island (1986); Pontins (1987–current); Pontins Sand Bay (2024–)
- Location: Prestatyn; Kewstoke
- Country: Wales
- Established: 1974
- Organisation(s): WDF
- Format: Legs
- Prize fund: £5,040 (Men's); £2,170 (Women's); £200 (Boys); £75 (Girls)
- Month(s) Played: August

Current champion(s)
- Mitchell Lawrie (men's); Kirsi Viinikainen (women's); Mitchell Lawrie (boys); Paige Pauling (girls)

The Welsh Open is a darts tournament organised by the World Darts Federation and previously affiliated with the British Darts Organisation which has been staged annually since 1974. From 1987 to 2023 the event was staged at the Pontins holiday camp in Prestatyn, North Wales. In 2024 and 2025 the event was held at Pontins Sand Bay in Kewstoke, Weston-super-Mare. This is due to the reconstruction of the facility in Wales, meaning the competition was moved to England.

The singles tournaments are sponsored by Red Dragon Darts and Pontins sponsor the other events.

The men's tournament has been held since 1974, while the women's competition was introduced in 1990. The first winners of the tournament was David Jones and Sandra Greatbatch from Wales.

In 2008, in order to popularise international tournaments organised by the British Darts Organisation, the initiative established the BDO International Grand Prix Series, which brings together the most important World Darts Federation tournaments held in United Kingdom. The tournament was televised in the United Kingdom for the first time that year on Setanta Sports.

The youngest winner of the tournament is Mitchell Lawrie, who won it in 2025 at just 14 years old.

== List of tournaments ==
=== Men's ===
Year	Champion	Av.	Score	Runner-Up	Av.	Prize Money			Venue
Year	Champion	Av.	Score	Runner-Up	Av.	Total	Ch.	R.-Up	Venue
1974	(Wales) David Jones	n/a	beat	(England) Cliff Inglis	n/a	n/a	n/a	n/a	(Wales) Ebbw Vale
1975	(Wales) Leighton Rees	n/a	beat	(Wales) Phil Obbard	n/a	n/a	n/a	n/a	(Wales) Ebbw Vale
1976	(Wales) Alan Evans	n/a	beat	(Scotland) Rab Smith	n/a	n/a	n/a	n/a	(Wales) Ebbw Vale
1977	(England) Eric Bristow	n/a	beat	(England) John Lowe	n/a	n/a	n/a	n/a	(Wales) Ebbw Vale
1978	(England) Tony Brown	n/a	beat	(England) Cliff Lazarenko	n/a	n/a	n/a	n/a	(Wales) Ebbw Vale
1979	(England) Eric Bristow (2)	n/a	beat	(Australia) Terry O'Dea	n/a	n/a	n/a	n/a	(Wales) Ebbw Vale
1980	(Wales) Ceri Morgan	n/a	2 – 0	(Wales) Wayne Lock	n/a	n/a	n/a	n/a	(Wales) Diamond Theatre Club, Caerphilly
1981	(England) Eric Bristow (3)	n/a	beat	(Wales) Ceri Morgan	n/a	n/a	n/a	n/a	(Wales) Ebbw Vale
1982	(England) John Lowe	n/a	beat	(Northern Ireland) Steve Brennan	n/a	n/a	n/a	n/a	(Wales) Ebbw Vale
1983	(England) Dave Whitcombe	n/a	beat	(England) Paul Reynolds	n/a	n/a	n/a	n/a	(Wales) Ebbw Vale
1984	(England) Eric Bristow (4)	n/a	beat	(Scotland) Jocky Wilson	n/a	n/a	n/a	n/a	(Wales) Ebbw Vale
1985	(England) David Lee	n/a	beat	(Northern Ireland) Steve Brennan	n/a	n/a	n/a	n/a	(Wales) Ebbw Vale
1986	(England) Cliff Lazarenko	n/a	beat	(England) Bob Anderson	n/a	n/a	n/a	n/a	(Wales) Butlin's Barry Island, Barry Island
1987	(Scotland) Peter Masson	n/a	beat	(Wales) Chris Johns	n/a	n/a	n/a	n/a	(Wales) Pontins, Prestatyn
1988	(England) Steve Gittins	n/a	beat	(England) Paul Reynolds	n/a	n/a	n/a	n/a	(Wales) Pontins, Prestatyn
1989	(England) Chris Dalton	n/a	beat	(England) Paul Reynolds	n/a	n/a	n/a	n/a	(Wales) Pontins, Prestatyn
1990	(England) Kevin Kenny	n/a	beat	(England) Alan Warriner	n/a	n/a	n/a	n/a	(Wales) Pontins, Prestatyn
1991	(England) Ronnie Baxter	n/a	2 – 1	(Wales) Marshall James	n/a	n/a	n/a	n/a	(Wales) Pontins, Prestatyn
1992	(England) Dennis Priestley	n/a	2 – 1	(England) Alan Warriner	n/a	n/a	n/a	n/a	(Wales) Pontins, Prestatyn
1993	(England) Ronnie Baxter (2)	n/a	beat	(England) Dave Askew	n/a	n/a	n/a	n/a	(Wales) Pontins, Prestatyn
1994	(Wales) Richie Burnett	n/a	beat	(England) Andy Jenkins	n/a	n/a	n/a	n/a	(Wales) Pontins, Prestatyn
1995	(Wales) Richie Burnett (2)	90.42	2 – 1	(England) Martin Adams	89.82	n/a	n/a	n/a	(Wales) Pontins, Prestatyn
1996	(England) Nicky Turner	n/a	beat	(Scotland) Alan Brown	n/a	n/a	n/a	n/a	(Wales) Pontins, Prestatyn
1997	(Wales) Marshall James	86.19	2 – 1	(England) Ian Roe	82.98	n/a	n/a	n/a	(Wales) Pontins, Prestatyn
1998	(Wales) Steve Alker	n/a	2 – 0	(England) Colin Monk	n/a	£2,640	£1,200	£500	(Wales) Pontins, Prestatyn
1999	(England) Andy Smith	n/a	beat	(England) Ronnie Baxter	n/a	n/a	n/a	n/a	(Wales) Pontins, Prestatyn
2000	(England) John Walton	n/a	beat	(England) Peter Allen	n/a	n/a	n/a	n/a	(Wales) Pontins, Prestatyn
2001	(Scotland) Gary Anderson	n/a	2 – 0	(England) John Walton	n/a	n/a	n/a	n/a	(Wales) Pontins, Prestatyn
2002	(England) Andy Fordham	n/a	2 – 0	(England) Ian Jones	n/a	n/a	n/a	n/a	(Wales) Pontins, Prestatyn
2003	(England) Ian Brand	85.62	2 – 0	(Wales) Ritchie Davies	82.26	n/a	n/a	n/a	(Wales) Pontins, Prestatyn
2004	(Wales) Tony Ridler	83.28	2 – 1	(England) Tony West	81.21	n/a	n/a	n/a	(Wales) Pontins, Prestatyn
2005	(Denmark) Per Laursen	82.68	2 – 0	(Netherlands) Kees Slokkers	73.08	n/a	n/a	n/a	(Wales) Pontins, Prestatyn
2006	(Netherlands) Michael van Gerwen	104.49	2 – 0	(Scotland) Gary Anderson	95.25	n/a	n/a	n/a	(Wales) Pontins, Prestatyn
2007	(Wales) Mark Webster	97.29	2 – 0	(England) Scott Waites	82.11	n/a	n/a	n/a	(Wales) Pontins, Prestatyn
2008	(Scotland) Gary Anderson (2)	n/a	4 – 0	(Wales) Mark Webster	n/a	n/a	n/a	n/a	(Wales) Pontins, Prestatyn
2009	(Scotland) Ross Montgomery	n/a	3 – 0	(Scotland) Mark Barilli	n/a	n/a	n/a	n/a	(Wales) Pontins, Prestatyn
2010	(England) Paul Jennings	n/a	2 – 1	(Netherlands) Toon Greebe	n/a	n/a	n/a	n/a	(Wales) Pontins, Prestatyn
2011	(Scotland) Ross Montgomery (2)	n/a	2 – 1	(Wales) Martin Phillips	n/a	n/a	n/a	n/a	(Wales) Pontins, Prestatyn
2012	(Wales) Tony Bradley	n/a	6 – 5	(England) Tony O'Shea	n/a	n/a	n/a	n/a	(Wales) Pontins, Prestatyn
2013	(England) Stephen Bunting	n/a	6 – 5	(England) Robbie Green	n/a	n/a	n/a	n/a	(Wales) Pontins, Prestatyn
2014	(England) Martin Adams	n/a	6 – 2	(England) Gary Robson	n/a	n/a	n/a	n/a	(Wales) Pontins, Prestatyn
2015	(England) Glen Durrant	n/a	6 – 1	(England) Scott Waites	n/a	n/a	n/a	n/a	(Wales) Pontins, Prestatyn
2016	(England) Scott Mitchell	98.06	6 – 5	(England) Glen Durrant	96.21	n/a	n/a	n/a	(Wales) Pontins, Prestatyn
2017	(England) Glen Durrant (2)	93.81	6 – 4	(England) Scott Waites	90.30	n/a	n/a	n/a	(Wales) Pontins, Prestatyn
2018	(Wales) Michael Warburton	n/a	6 – 3	(England) Andy Hamilton	n/a	n/a	n/a	n/a	(Wales) Pontins, Prestatyn
2019	(Netherlands) Martijn Kleermaker	n/a	6 – 5	(Wales) Jim Williams	n/a	n/a	n/a	n/a	(Wales) Pontins, Prestatyn
2021	Cameron Menzies	91.09	6 – 0	James Hurrell	75.36	£16,080	£4,000	£2,000	(Wales) Pontins, Prestatyn
2022	Luke Littler	93.71	6 – 2	Wes Newton	89.93	£12,140	£3,000	£1,500	(Wales) Pontins, Prestatyn
2023	Martyn Turner	76.50	5 – 3	(England) Cliff Prior	71.86	£9,000	£3,000	£1,200	(Wales) Pontins, Prestatyn
2024	(Scotland) Andy Davidson	90.24	5 – 1	Matthew Edgar	81.06	£5,040	£1,500	£700	(England) Pontins Sand Bay, North Somerset

=== Women's ===
Year	Champion	Av.	Score	Runner-Up	Av.	Prize Money			Venue
Year	Champion	Av.	Score	Runner-Up	Av.	Total	Ch.	R.-Up	Venue
1990	(Wales) Sandra Greatbatch	n/a	beat	(England) Sharon Colclough	n/a	n/a	n/a	n/a	Pontins, Prestatyn
1991	(England) Jane Stubbs	n/a	beat	(England) Elsie Halligan	n/a	n/a	n/a	n/a	Pontins, Prestatyn
1992	(England) Sue Edwards	n/a	beat	(England) Sharon Colclough	n/a	n/a	n/a	n/a	Pontins, Prestatyn
1993	(England) Deta Hedman	n/a	beat	(Wales) Sandra Greatbatch	n/a	n/a	n/a	n/a	Pontins, Prestatyn
1994	(England) Deta Hedman (2)	n/a	beat	(Wales) Sandra Greatbatch	n/a	n/a	n/a	n/a	Pontins, Prestatyn
1995	(Wales) Sandra Greatbatch (2)	n/a	beat	(England) Deta Hedman	n/a	n/a	n/a	n/a	Pontins, Prestatyn
1996	(Scotland) Anne Kirk	n/a	beat	(England) Crissy Manley	n/a	n/a	n/a	n/a	Pontins, Prestatyn
1997	(England) Trina Gulliver	n/a	beat	(England) Mandy Solomons	n/a	n/a	n/a	n/a	Pontins, Prestatyn
1998	(Netherlands) Francis Hoenselaar	n/a	beat	(England) Trina Gulliver	n/a	n/a	n/a	n/a	Pontins, Prestatyn
1999	(Scotland) Anne Kirk (2)	n/a	beat	(England) Sarah Hall	n/a	n/a	n/a	n/a	Pontins, Prestatyn
2000	(England) Crissy Manley	n/a	beat	(England) Apylee Jones	n/a	n/a	n/a	n/a	Pontins, Prestatyn
2001	(Sweden) Carina Ekberg	n/a	beat	(Wales) Sandra Greatbatch	n/a	n/a	n/a	n/a	Pontins, Prestatyn
2002	(England) Trina Gulliver (2)	n/a	beat	(England) Sarah Hall	n/a	n/a	n/a	n/a	Pontins, Prestatyn
2003	(England) Trina Gulliver (3)	n/a	beat	(Scotland) Louise Hepburn	n/a	n/a	n/a	n/a	Pontins, Prestatyn
2004	(England) Trina Gulliver (4)	n/a	beat	(Wales) Jan Robbins	n/a	n/a	n/a	n/a	Pontins, Prestatyn
2005	(England) Trina Gulliver (5)	n/a	beat	(England) Lisa Ashton	n/a	n/a	n/a	n/a	Pontins, Prestatyn
2006	(England) Trina Gulliver (6)	n/a	beat	(Wales) Julie Gore	n/a	n/a	n/a	n/a	Pontins, Prestatyn
2007	(England) Trina Gulliver (7)	n/a	beat	(Netherlands) Francis Hoenselaar	n/a	n/a	n/a	n/a	Pontins, Prestatyn
2008	(Russia) Anastasia Dobromyslova	n/a	3 – 0	(England) Louise Carroll	n/a	n/a	n/a	n/a	Pontins, Prestatyn
2009	(Wales) Julie Gore	n/a	3 – 0	(England) Trina Gulliver	n/a	n/a	n/a	n/a	Pontins, Prestatyn
2010	(England) Trina Gulliver (8)	n/a	4 – 3	(Netherlands) Karin ten Kate	n/a	n/a	n/a	n/a	Pontins, Prestatyn
2011	(England) Deta Hedman (3)	(n/a	4 – 1	(England) Karen Lawman	n/a	£6,120	£2,000	£1,000	Pontins, Prestatyn
2012	(England) Deta Hedman (4)	n/a	4 – 3	(Russia) Anastasia Dobromyslova	n/a	£6,120	£2,000	£1,000	Pontins, Prestatyn
2013	(Netherlands) Aileen de Graaf	n/a	5 – 1	(Wales) Julie Gore	n/a	£6,120	£2,000	£1,000	Pontins, Prestatyn
2014	(Russia) Anastasia Dobromyslova (2)	n/a	5 – 2	(England) Deta Hedman	n/a	£6,120	£2,000	£1,000	Pontins, Prestatyn
2015	(England) Lisa Ashton	n/a	5 – 4	(England) Lorraine Winstanley	n/a	£6,120	£2,000	£1,000	Pontins, Prestatyn
2016	(England) Deta Hedman (5)	n/a	5 – 4	(Netherlands) Sharon Prins	n/a	£6,540	£2,000	£1,000	Pontins, Prestatyn
2017	(England) Lorraine Winstanley	83.52	5 – 4	(England) Lisa Ashton	81.66	£6,540	£2,000	£1,000	Pontins, Prestatyn
2018	(England) Deta Hedman (6)	n/a	5 – 2	(Russia) Anastasia Dobromyslova	n/a	£6,540	£2,000	£1,000	Pontins, Prestatyn
2019	Beau Greaves	n/a	5 – 3	(England) Lisa Ashton	n/a	£6,540	£2,000	£1,000	Pontins, Prestatyn
2021	Kirsty Hutchinson	73.70	5 – 4	Beau Greaves	77.96	£7,040	£2,000	£1,000	Pontins, Prestatyn
2022	Beau Greaves (2)	93.53	5 – 4	Fallon Sherrock	92.44	£5,320	£1,500	£750	Pontins, Prestatyn
2023	Beau Greaves (3)	77.45	5 – 3	Rhian O'Sullivan	79.90	£2,600	£1,000	£400	Pontins, Prestatyn
2024	Beau Greaves (4)	72.31	5 – 4	Rhian O'Sullivan	74.48	£2,600	£1,000	£400	

=== Boys ===
Year	Champion	Av.	Score	Runner-Up	Av.	Prize Money			Venue
Year	Champion	Av.	Score	Runner-Up	Av.	Total	Ch.	R.-Up	Venue
2012	(England) Conor Mayes	n/a	beat	(Wales) Isaac Weaver	n/a	–	–	–	Pontins, Prestatyn
2019	(England) James Beeton	n/a	beat	(England) Maison Wilson	n/a	–	–	–	Pontins, Prestatyn
2021	(England) Luke Littler	96.97	4 – 0	(England) Cayden Smith	74.00	–	–	–	Pontins, Prestatyn
2022	(England) Luke Littler (2)	83.50	4 – 0	(England) Cayden Smith	56.74	–	–	–	Pontins, Prestatyn
2023	Thomas Banks	74.22	3 – 0	(Wales) Fabian Topper	57.35	£200	£100	£50	Pontins, Prestatyn
2024	(England) Jack Nankervis	80.39	4 – 3	(England) Jenson Walker	84.29	£200	£100	£50	

=== Girls ===
Year	Champion	Av.	Score	Runner-Up	Av.	Prize Money			Venue
Year	Champion	Av.	Score	Runner-Up	Av.	Total	Ch.	R.-Up	Venue
2012	(England) Josie Paterson	n/a	beat	(Scotland) Cody Hepburn	n/a	–	–	–	Pontins, Prestatyn
2019	(England) Beau Greaves	n/a	beat	(Wales) Tamzin Parr	n/a	–	–	–	Pontins, Prestatyn
2021	(England) Eleanor Cairns	58.21	4 – 1	(England) Ella Williams	51.34	–	–	–	Pontins, Prestatyn
2022	Paige Pauling	66.63	4 – 2	(England) Amy Evans	60.95	–	–	–	Pontins, Prestatyn
2023	Paige Pauling (2)	73.12	4 – 2	Sophie McKinlay	69.37	£200	£100	£50	Pontins, Prestatyn
