= Abertridwr railway station =

Disused railway station in Abertridwr, Caerphilly

Coordinates: 51.59468°N 3.27122°W

Abertridwr
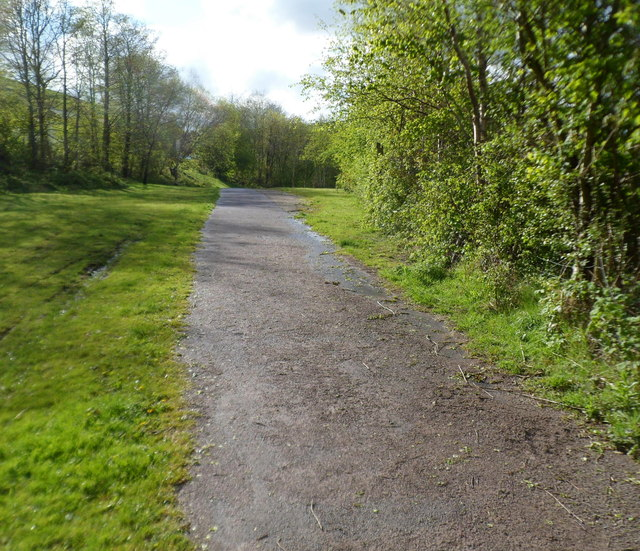
- The site of the station in 2012

General information
- Location: Abertridwr, Caerphilly; Wales
- Platforms: 2

Other information
- Status: Disused

History
- Original company: Rhymney Railway
- Pre-grouping: Great Western Railway

Key dates
- 1 February 1894: Opened as Aber
- 26 June 1899: Renamed
- 15 June 1964: Closed
Location

Abertridwr railway station was a station which served Abertridwr, in the Welsh county of Glamorgan. It was served by trains on the line from Caerphilly to Senghenydd. The nearest station to Abertridwr is now Aber.

== History ==
Opened as Aber by the Rhymney Railway it became part of the Great Western Railway during the Grouping of 1923. The line then passed on to the Western Region of British Railways on nationalisation in 1948. It was then closed by the British Railways Board.

== The site today ==
The old platform can be seen in the ground.

== Sources ==
- Butt, R. V. J. (October 1995). The Directory of Railway Stations: details every public and private passenger station, halt, platform and stopping place, past and present (1st ed.). Sparkford: Patrick Stephens Ltd. ISBN 978-1-85260-508-7. OCLC 60251199. OL 11956311M.
- Jowett, A. (2000). Jowett's Nationalised Railway Atlas. Atlantic Publishing. ISBN 0-906899-99-0.
- Michell, Vic (2009). Rhymney and New Tredegar Lines. Middleton Press. ISBN 978-0-906008-48-5.

Preceding station	Disused railways	Following station
Windsor Colliery Halt	Great Western Railway; Rhymney Railway	Penyrheol Halt
