= Welsh Open =

Welsh Open may refer to:

- Welsh Open (darts)
- Welsh Open (snooker)
- Wales Open - golf tournament held at the Celtic Manor Resort, Newport
