= Aber railway station =

Railway station in Caerphilly, Wales

Aber
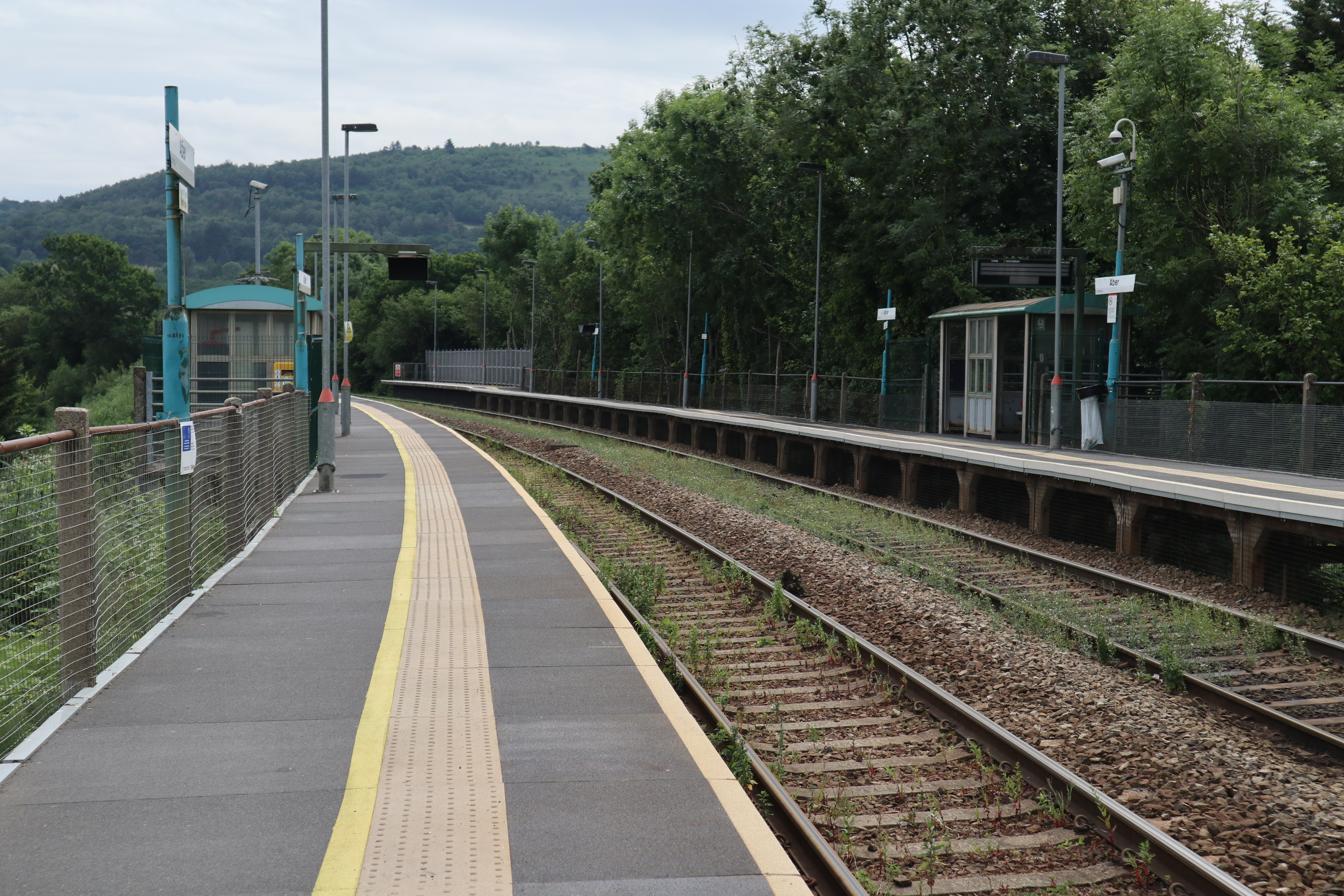
- The station in June 2023

General information
- Location: Trecenydd, Caerphilly, Wales
- Coordinates: 51.5749°N 3.2299°W
- Grid reference: ST148869
- Manager: Transport for Wales
- Platforms: 2

Other information
- Station code: ABE
- Classification: DfT category F2

History
- Opened: April 1908 (as Beddau Halt)

Key dates
- 17 September 1926: Renamed Aber Junction Halt
- 6 May 1968: Renamed Aber Halt
- c. 1969: Renamed Aber

Passengers
- 2021/22: ▲73,642
- 2022/23: ▲0.104 million
- 2023/24: ▲0.137 million
- 2024/25: ▲0.145 million
- 2025/26: ▼97,790
Location
Notes
- Passenger statistics from the Office of Rail and Road

Aber railway station serves the Bondfield Park and Trecenydd areas of the town of Caerphilly, in south Wales. It is a stop on the Rhymney Line, 8 miles 70 chains (14.3 km) from Cardiff (Bute East Dock), near Cardiff Bay, on the Valley Lines network, and is between Caerphilly and Energlyn & Churchill Park. The station is managed by Transport for Wales Rail, who operate all services.

== History ==
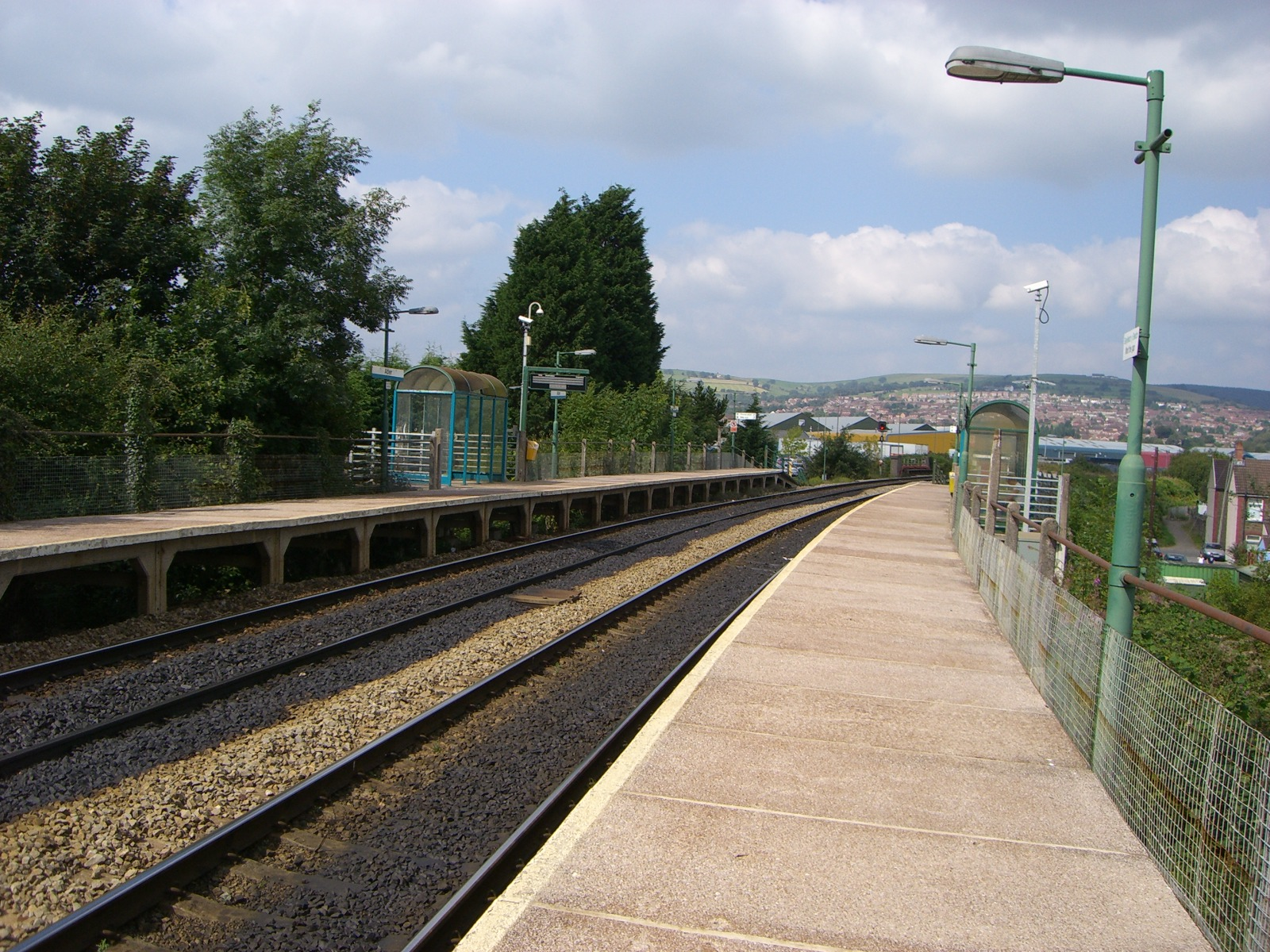
The station seen in 2007

Opened on 1 April 1908 by the Rhymney Railway as Beddau Halt, it was renamed Aber Junction Halt on 17 September 1926. It was renamed Aber Halt on 6 May 1968, then Aber sometime in 1968 or 1969.

A different station also called Beddau Halt existed on the Llantrisant and Taff Vale Junction Railway.

The Junction suffix refers to the fact that until the early 1980s, there were two junctions near here:

- one to the south, between the current line via Caerphilly (which opened in 1871) and the original route down the Big Hill via Penrhos Junction to Walnut Tree Junction near Taffs Well on the Taff Vale Railway route from Cardiff to Merthyr Tydfil
- the other to the north for the branch line to Senghenydd.

The Senghenydd branch passenger service ended in June 1964 as a result of the Beeching Axe, but it remained in use for colliery traffic until 1977, whilst the Taffs Well route closed in June 1982; both have since been dismantled.

The station was temporarily closed for six weeks in 2022 for resurfacing of the platforms, following safety concerns.

The line through the station was electrified in late 2025.

== Facilities ==
The station previously had an independently-run ticket office, one of 21 stations in the country as of 2018. It closed during Covid-19, then reopened (this time run by Transport for Wales staff). However, the ticket office has been permanently closed since 2023.

The station has a car park, ticket machines, shelters, help points and live departure screens.

== Passenger volume ==
Passenger volume at Aber
	2004–05	2005–06	2006–07	2007–08	2008–09	2009–10	2010–11	2011–12	2012–13	2013–14	2014–15	2015–16	2016–17	2017–18	2018–19	2019–20	2020–21	2021–22	2022–23	2023–24	2024–25
Entries and exits	134,191	136,549	169,463	183,136	192,180	192,788	202,486	203,432	209,622	219,868	212,546	214,996	227,270	251,108	245,218	228,480	15,712	73,642	103,976	136,896	145,234

The statistics cover twelve month periods that start in April.

== Services ==
Transport for Wales operates the following general off-peak service, in trains per hour (tph):

- 3 tph to Barry Island
- 1 tph to Bridgend
- 2 tph to Bargoed
- 2 tph to Rhymney.

Preceding station	National Rail	Following station
Caerphilly	Transport for Wales; Rhymney Line	Energlyn & Churchill Park or Llanbradach
	Historical railways	
Caerphilly; Station and line open	Great Western Railway; Rhymney Line	Pwll-y-Pant; Station closed; Line open
	Disused railways	
Penyrheol Halt; Line and station closed	Great Western Railway; Senghenydd Branch	Terminus

== Bibliography ==
- Butt, R.V.J. (1995). The Directory of Railway Stations. Patrick Stephens Ltd. ISBN 1-85260-508-1.
- Marshall, Geoff; Pipe, Vicki (2018). The Railway Adventures: Places, Trains, People and Stations. September Publishing. ISBN 978-1910463871.
- Quick, Michael (2023). Railway Passenger Stations in Great Britain: A Chronology (PDF) (5th ed.). London: Railway and Canal Historical Society.
