= Barry Pier railway station =

Disused railway station in Barry Island, Wales

Coordinates: 51.3933°N 3.2618°W

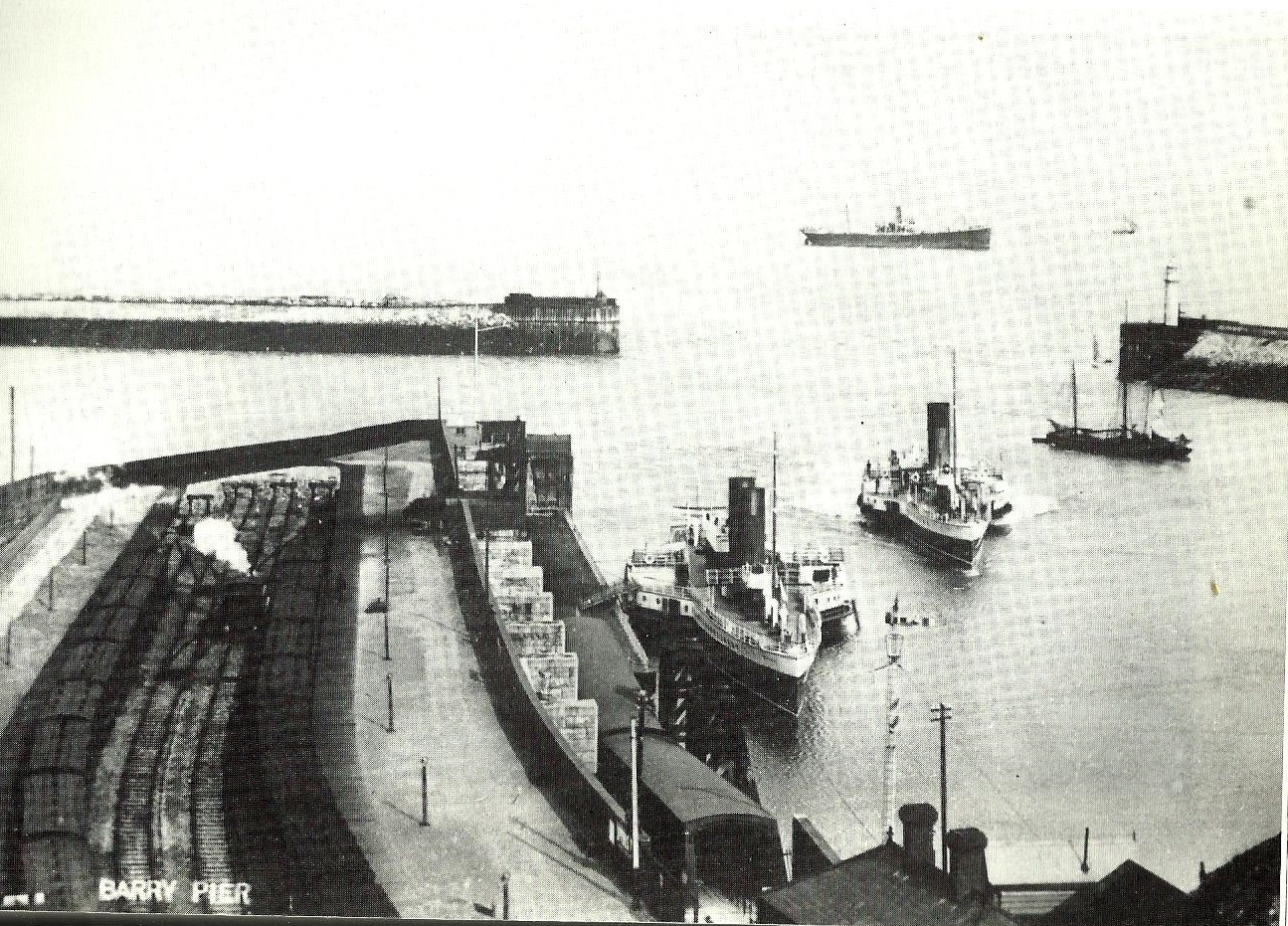
Barry Pier (c. 1908)

Barry Pier railway station was a railway station in Barry Island, in Wales. It was the terminus of the Barry Island branch line, was authorised in 1896 and opened on 27 June 1899 when the line was extended from Barry Island railway station. There was a 280-yard (260 m) tunnel connecting the two railway stations which descended at a gradient of 1 in 80 (1.25%). The last steamer Balmoral called at the floating pontoon located beside the station in October 1971 and the last train (a special excursion) in April 1973, but Barry Pier station was not officially closed until 5 July 1976.

The tunnel is now bricked up at both ends but the west end has an access door to the partly used section of the tunnel for a rifle range and a metalled access lane from the Barry Island road system to the tunnel portal is laid on most of the former inclined trackbed falling towards the tunnel portal.

Preceding station	Disused railways	Following station
Barry Island; Line closed, station open	Barry Railway; Barry-Barry Pier	Terminus
