= Windsor Colliery Halt railway station =

Disused railway station in Abertridwr, Caerphilly

Windsor Colliery Halt

General information
- Location: Abertridwr, Glamorgan; Wales
- Coordinates: 51.600960°N 3.274642°W
- Platforms: 1

Other information
- Status: Disused

History
- Original company: Great Western Railway

Key dates
- 6 September 1943: Opened
- 15 June 1964: Closed
Location

Windsor Colliery Halt railway station served Windsor Colliery in the village of Abertridwr, in the historic county of Glamorgan, Wales, from 1943 to 1964 on the Senghenydd branch of the Rhymney Railway.

== History ==
The station was opened on 6 September 1943 by the Great Western Railway, although the agreement for the station was made on 4 October of the same year. It closed on 15 June 1964.

Preceding station	Disused railways	Following station
Senghenydd; Line and station closed	Great Western Railway; Rhymney Railway	Abertridwr; Line and station closed
