= Barry Tourist Railway =

Former visitor attraction in South Wales

Coordinates: 51°23′31″N 3°16′31″W

Barry Tourist Railway (formerly Barry Island Railway)
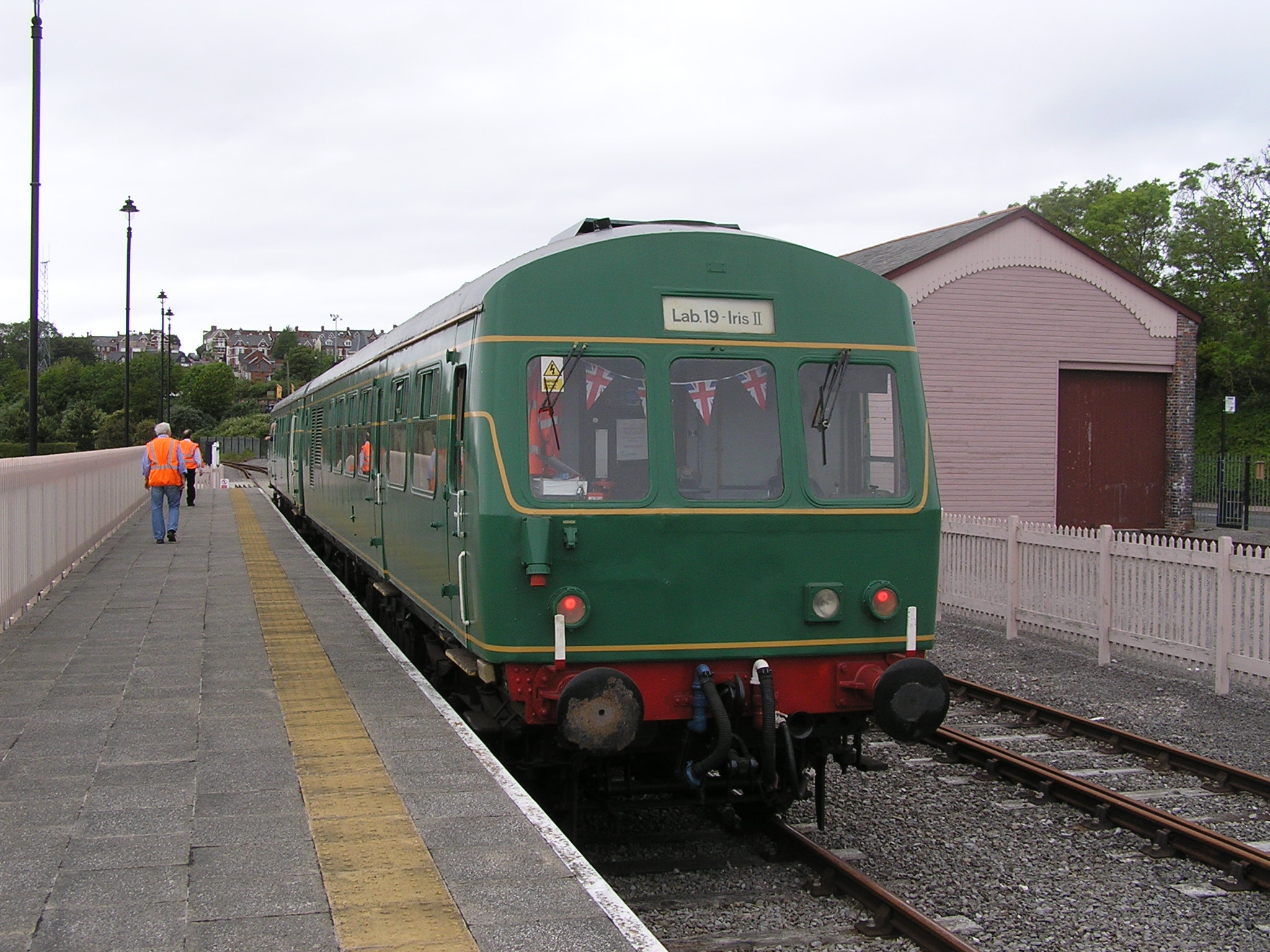
- Barry Tourist Railway
- Locale: Barry, Vale of Glamorgan, South Wales
- Terminus: Barry Island Railway Station

Commercial operations
- Name: Barry Island Branch
- Built by: Barry Railway Company
- Original gauge: 4 ft 8 1/2 in (1,435 mm) standard gauge

Preserved operations
- Operated by: 1997–2008 – Vale of Glamorgan Railway Company; 2009–2022 – Cambrian Transport
- Stations: 5
- Length: 2.4 kilometres (1.5 mi) + 0.8 kilometres (0.50 mi) branch
- Preserved gauge: 4 ft 8 1/2 in (1,435 mm) standard gauge

Commercial history
- Opened: 1885
- Closed: Pier station 5 July 1976

Preservation history
- 1994: Vale of Glamorgan Railway Company (VGR) formed
- 1996: Butetown Historic Railway Society officially becomes the VGR
- Jun 1997: New base opened at Plymouth Road
- Apr 1998: First operations commenced
- 2002: First operations across the Causeway
- 2005: New high level line to Woodham Halt opened
- Sep 2005: Marketing name changed to Barry Island Railway
- Aug 2007: Extension to Gladstone Bridge complete
- Mar 2008: First passenger train to Gladstone Bridge
- Nov 2008: VoGC ceases VoGRC lease, chooses new operator (Cambrian Transport) by sealed bid process
- Jan 2009: December 2009 Cambrian Transport lease starts
- Aug 2015: Railway gets first owned operational steam locomotive, Susan
- 2022: Railway ceases operating trains and Transport for Wales takes over land

Website
- barrytouristrailway.co.uk

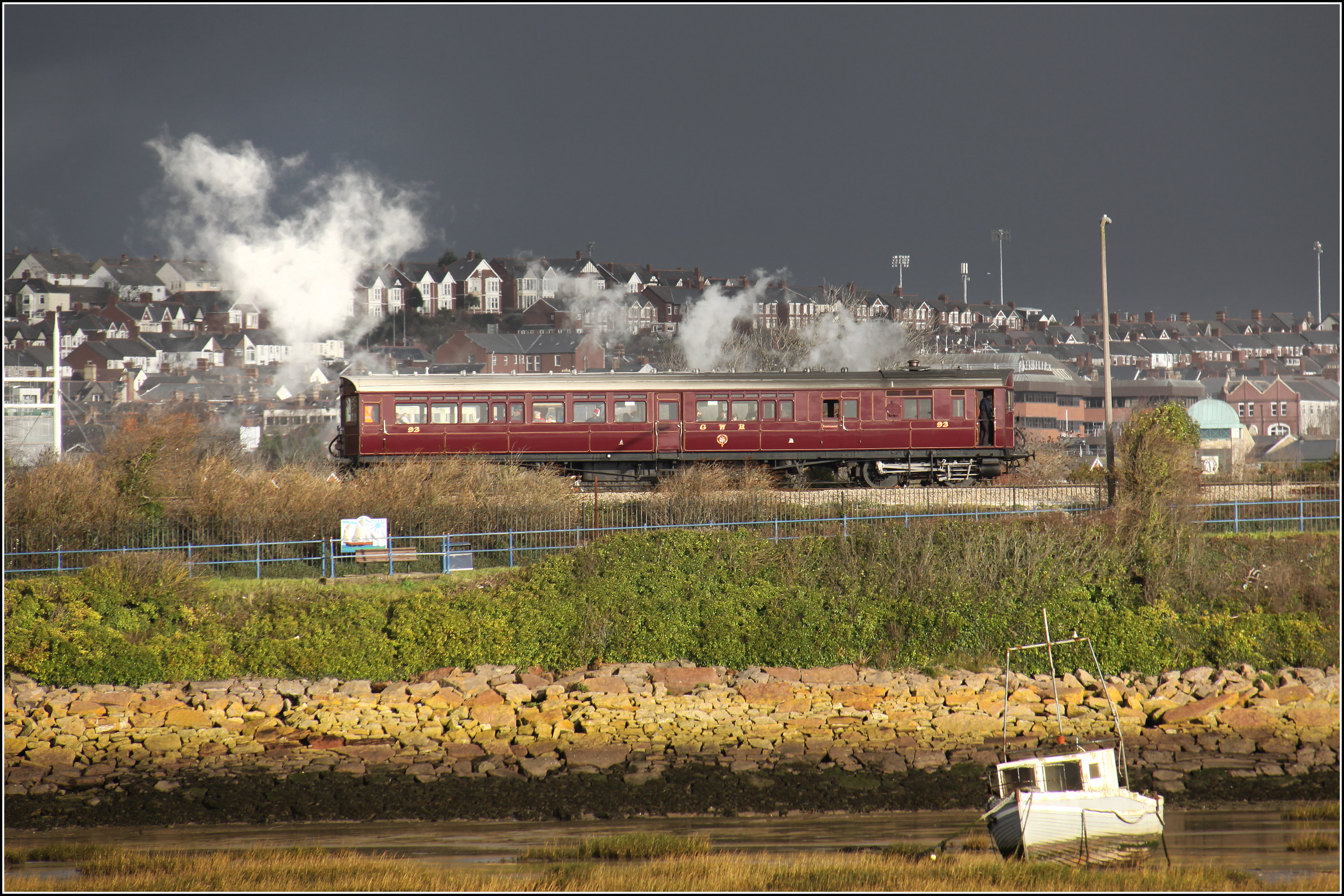
GWR steam rail motor at Barry Tourist Railway

The Barry Tourist Railway (formerly the Barry Island Railway) was a railway developed to attract visitors to Barry in the Vale of Glamorgan, South Wales. It was a key element of the Barry Rail Centre which also includes engineering and training facilities.

An unusual aspect of the railway was that, for several hundred yards across the Causeway from Barry to Barry Island, the trackbed ran directly alongside the Network Rail track, which used the original up line, while the Barry Tourist Railway used the down line. This continued from Barry, crossing the Causeway and the 149-yard (136 m) Barry Island viaduct, after which the two lines diverged into separate platforms at Barry Island. The railway did not consider itself a line but rather a network, as it operated two different routes. This is illustrated in the map below, with Network Rail shown in red, and the tourist railway shown in blue.

In November 2008, the landowner the Vale of Glamorgan Council, undertook a commercial tender exercise, which terminated the lease of previous operator the Vale of Glamorgan Railway in favour of a private operator, Cambrian Transport, under a 20-year-long lease. Operations commenced in December 2009 and a full year's programme of services operated during 2010. Details were shown on the Council website. Services were operated by IRIS II DMU (Class 101 twin-set), Class 26 No. 26 038, Class 73s 73 118 & 73 133 with a former Gatwick Express coaching stock set in push-pull mode, Class 20 20 228, Class 08 08 503, 0-6-0 Pannier Tank locomotive No. 9466, Great Western Steam Rail Motor No.93, Metropolitan Tank No.1, Hunslet 0-6-0T Jessie and an 8F tender loco.

== History ==
In 1979, the Butetown Historic Railway Society was formed in Cardiff, running a service along a short section of the Taff Vale Railway line from Cardiff Bute Road railway station northwards towards Queen St Station. As plans for the redevelopment of parts of Cardiff by the Cardiff Bay Development Corporation became clearer, the site was required for other purposes, and the railway was asked to leave. The Vale of Glamorgan Council bought Barry Island railway station and the newly-formed Vale of Glamorgan Railway Company was offered a lease of it, with financial aid from the Welsh Development Agency.

The project was supported by the Welsh Development Agency, with funding also being obtained from the European Regional Development Fund. These funds, together with some funding from the Vale of Glamorgan Railway Company, enabled Barry Island station to be refurbished by 1996. Further funds were awarded by the Welsh National Assembly in 2002, which were used to reinstate the line over the causeway between Barry Island and the mainland, and subsequently to extend the line to Gladstone Road Bridge. Trains were run from the station to the low level Hood Road Goods Shed and a new high level platform at Woodham Halt, later extended to Gladstone Bridge. In 1999, the railway attracted 8,500 visitors, and this had risen to 13,000 by 2004. The council supported the project with an annual grant of £65,000.

From mid-2006, the Vale of Glamorgan Council began to consider how the range of heritage and commercial activities associated with the railway project could be expanded, and the annual cost to the council of supporting the project could be reduced. By December 2007 they had identified some solutions. The Heritage Skills Training Centre and some adjacent track would be leased to a group called BRECO, who proposed to run a training facility covering restoration, railways and heritage, which would enable participants to gain NVQ qualifications. The BRECO group would also lease some office space and the storage area at Hood Road goods shed. There was a proposal by the Vale of Glamorgan Railway Company, acting on behalf of themselves, the Traditional Traction/D9521 Group and Barry Railcar Project, to lease the wheel drop shed and mess building at Barry Rail Depot, but the council decided that their business case was not sufficiently robust for this to proceed. The council also decided to put the operation of the railway out to tender, but to allow the existing operation to continue through 2008 while the tendering process was being undertaken.

The closing date for tenders was 26 September 2008. Of the six parties who were initially interested, only three submitted tenders. The successful tender was from Cambrian Transport Limited, a commercial company led by John Buxton, who was also responsible for creating the BRECO group. Their plans included extending the tracks to the Docks Office, and creating a Welsh National Railway Museum, utilising the Plymouth Road goods shed. They envisaged investing around £1 million in the project over the first eight years, and had an experienced management team. Furthermore, they were not expecting the council to fund any of their operation. A bid from Newco, run by Mike Thompson and Graham Lee, both of whom had heritage railway experience, was rejected because they failed to produce the required business plan.

Cambrian Transport had been the Council's railway adviser and contractor since the Barry Railway Project started. The company had been formed in 1995 by John Buxton, who had previously been responsible for managing the South Wales Valley Lines for British Rail. They had expertise in many aspects of railway contracting and consultancy. When they won the contract to operate the railway, the Vale of Glamorgan Railway Company moved all of their rolling stock, including a former National Coal Board saddle tank from Maesteg Colliery called Pamela, to the Garw Valley Railway at Pontycymer.

Cambrian Transport operated the railway at Barry from December 2009. They agreed to lease the operation of the railway for Vale of Glamorgan Council for 20 years from 1 January 2011. The railway at the time included around 2 miles (3.2 km) of track, 14 sidings, the station at Barry Island, a traditional-style shed at Plymnouth Road, the goods shed at Hood Road, the branch connecting to the Waterfront, and the historic shed at Barry dating from 1888, formerly owned by the Barry Railway Company and used as the base for their Barry Rail Centre. It was subsequently known as Barry Main Shed, and was used to store the stock used to run the railway and as the engineering workshop.

It operated the line for around 30 days per year and hosted numerous special events. The largest annual event for the first three years was the "Barry at War" Weekend, which attracted thousands of visitors to the town. In August 2014, Cambrian Transport sponsored a display by the Red Arrows and a fly-past by the Battle of Britain Memorial Flight during the event, bringing more people to Barry Island than in many years.

Santa Special trains were also popular during the Christmas period.

In 2022 the area was taken over by Transport for Wales and much of the rolling stock was moved. The line no longer runs trains.

== Route ==
The Barry Tourist Railway was centred at Barry Island railway station and platforms, which it shared with Transport for Wales (TfW) services. The station was maintained by Cambrian Transport and there was a shop, café and military museum as well as space for event displays and activities. At the west or 'Cardiff' end of the building, is the end of the Network Rail main platform 1 area. Access to the Barry Tourist Railway's used bay platform 4 and part of bay platform 3 (unused and having no track), is at the pier (east) end of the station. An unused section of Platform 1 and also having no track, runs to a point from the east end of the station building towards the Barry Island (or Pier) tunnel. The Barry Island Railway line exits the east end of the station and runs to Plymouth Road where a museum is to be developed. A short canopied platform at the museum building allows visitors to alight and see historic artefacts and exhibits when established whilst a DMU driver changes ends or steam-hauled trains have to run-around. In the past, certain trains ran through Barry Island station and a 280-yard tunnel to Barry Pier to connect with P&A Campbell's paddle steamer sailings in the Bristol Channel. At the moment the tunnel is blocked off and used as a shooting range. The former single track falling at 1 in 80 to the tunnel was lifted after 1976 and the inclined trackbed now serves as a metalled access road to the tunnel. The railway has long-term ambitions to reopen the tunnel and route to Barry Pier.

Heading west from Barry Island station, the Barry Tourist Railway's single line crosses the 149-yard (136 m) Barry Island double-line viaduct shared with Network Rail, before making a tight right-hand curve and splitting into two branches, one dropping down to Hood Road, (the Waterfront) the first section to be opened on a totally new inclined formation, the other heading past the former Barry Railway Co's steam shed and on to Woodham Halt and thence to the new terminus at Gladstone Bridge adjacent to Morrison's supermarket and a retail centre. It was intended to extend the line a further half mile to a site alongside Arriva Trains Wales’ Barry Docks Station, where an interchange was planned and where by 2013, a Park & Ride facility had been provided.

The running line ran near to the site of the former Woodham Brothers scrapyard which by April 2015 was being developed as a new housing complex and by 13 April 2015, a new ASDA superstore had been built and opened, all on the site of what was known in railway terms as 'West Pond' before being completely backfilled. The Waterfront terminus was alongside the old Barry Railway Co's Hood Road goods shed and also conveniently situated near a new Premier Inn and Brewers Fayre establishment opened in 2014 at the south-western end of Barry No.1 dock. The Waterfront platform and terminus were located opposite the old Barry Railway Co's Hydraulic pumphouse and electrical generating building, now a listed structure and as at August 2015, was undergoing extensive internal and external refurbishment and bore vertically lettered identities placed on two sides of its taper square chimney, one face stating PUMPHOUSE and the other TY PWMP, but the correct circumflex above the letter Y was omitted. The former Barry Railway Co's Loco shed at Barry, opened in 1888, stabled 148 engines at the GWR 1922 grouping, all re-numbered by the GWR. By September 1947 and the nationalisation of the railways, Barry shed had a complement of 85 steam locomotives. It closed to steam engines in September 1964. The shed and outbuildings served as an English, Welsh & Scottish Railway wagon repair centre before being taken over by the Vale of Glamorgan Council in the 1990s. It became the main running shed for the tourist railway and was also used to store and repair rolling stock. This site was renamed Barry Main Depot by Cambrian Transport.

Some parts of the line, particularly around the Plymouth Road/Barry Island and Barry Town area, were used for several scenes in the Doctor Who episodes "The Empty Child" and "The Doctor Dances" in January 2005 and more recently for the episode "Flatline" screened in October 2014. Other recent filming includes Being Human, Ar-y-Tracs and "Stella (UK TV series)" – the last two featuring Ruth Jones.

By July 2014, the Network Rail connection to the Barry Tourist Railway infrastructure at Barry was completely remodelled, coincident with the commissioning of the new Network Rail re-signalling project and closure of Barry signal box, the latter being demolished on the weekend of 28–29 March 2015.

== Rolling stock ==
Stock marked with an asterisk (*) was located at the Barry Main Depot. On most running days, guided shed tours were offered by the railway.

Steam locomotives The last locomotives to leave Dai Woodham's scrapyard were the remains of the vast number of locomotives left when the yard closed – and as there were ten of them, were a group often called the Barry Ten. Most of them were subsequently removed for use in heritage railway projects and for restoration elsewhere, with John Buxton acting on behalf of the council to secure homes for eight of them and the final two remaining on the Barry Tourist Railway. They were joined by a third member in 2014, and were publicly viewable on most operating days.

- Sentinel Waggon Works 0-4-0 vertical boilered tank No. 9537 "Susan"* built in 1952. This was operational, having arrived from the South Devon Railway in August 2015. It was used in successful trials of compressed wood and sawdust logs, as the railway looked at ways to become carbon-neutral. While more expensive than coal, fuel consumption was less when burning the logs, making the 'cost per day' roughly equivalent.
- BR 2-10-0 Class 9F No. 92245* built in 1959. One of the two Barry Ten locomotives, its boiler had been used in the restoration of No.92212. It was in a dismantled state, but was due to be re-assembled and displayed as part of an exhibition about the importance of the Barry scrapyard to railway preservation in the UK.

Locomotives undergoing restoration Two locomotives undergoing restoration were located at the Barry New Works Building, adjacent to Woodham Halt. However, the lease on this building was due to end after 2020, so the locomotives were moved to Plymouth Road.

- GWR 2-6-2T 4575 Class No. 5539 built in 1928. Owned by Hugh Shipton and moved to the site in 2014. Under restoration as of 2026.
- GWR Collett 0-6-2T 5600 Class No. 6686 built in 1928. One of the Barry Ten, owned by Barry Tourist Railway Director, John Buxton.

The following were also on site:

Diesel locomotives

- BR 0-6-0DE Class 08 No.08503* – Restoration was nearing completion in 2020.
- BR Class 20 Class 20 No. 20 228* (CFD No. 2004) – Non-operational but under overhaul in 2015. – Owned by Steve Madge).
- English Electric Class 73 electro-diesel No.73118. The locomotive worked on the Channel Tunnel Rail Link, and was adapted to pull Eurostar stock.
- BR Class 73 electro-diesel No.73133, formerly based at Eastleigh Works.

Diesel Multiple Units

- BR Class 101 unit (Iris II)* – Operational and owned by Cambrian Transport. 2-car former departmental testing unit formed of RDS 977963 and RDB 977964. Both coaches were fitted with seats from BR Mark 3 coaches.
- BR Class 101 Driving Trailer Composite Lavatory (DTCL) 6300* – stored, owned by Cambrian Transport – some work carried out to restore this coach as an observation vehicle.

Other rolling stock included:-

- DW139 Great Western Toplight Coach 2360 of 1911
- CDA clay hopper wagon
- HAA Hopper wagon
- Bogie Bolster wagon
- 2 Grampus Wagons
- Covered air-braked wagon (Cov AB)
- Ex LNER Permanent Way Brake Van (Privately owned, under restoration by private owners)

The plan was to acquire further wagons to make up two rakes of wagons – one vacuum-braked and one air-braked set.

== Bibliography ==
- Boyd-Hope, Gary (June 2020). "The Barry Tourist Railway". The Railway Magazine. ISSN 0033-8923.
