= Penyrheol Halt railway station =

Disused railway station in Penyrheol, Caerphilly

Penyrheol Halt

General information
- Location: Penyrheol, Glamorgan; Wales
- Coordinates: 51.5843°N 3.2423°W
- Grid reference: ST140879
- Platforms: 1

Other information
- Status: Disused

History
- Original company: Rhymney Railway
- Pre-grouping: Rhymney Railway
- Post-grouping: Great Western Railway

Key dates
- 1 February 1894: Opened
- 15 June 1964: Closed
Location

Penyrheol Halt railway station served the area of Penyrheol, in the historical county of Glamorgan, Wales, from 1894 to 1964 on the Senghenydd branch of the Rhymney Railway.

== History ==
The station was opened on 1 February 1894 by the Rhymney Railway. It was downgraded to an unstaffed halt in 1930, although this change only appeared in the timetables from 1952. The station closed on 15 June 1964.

Preceding station	Disused railways	Following station
Abertridwr; Line and station closed	Rhymney Railway	Aber; Line closed, station open
