= Butlin's Barry Island =

Holiday camp in Wales, 1966–1996

Barry Island
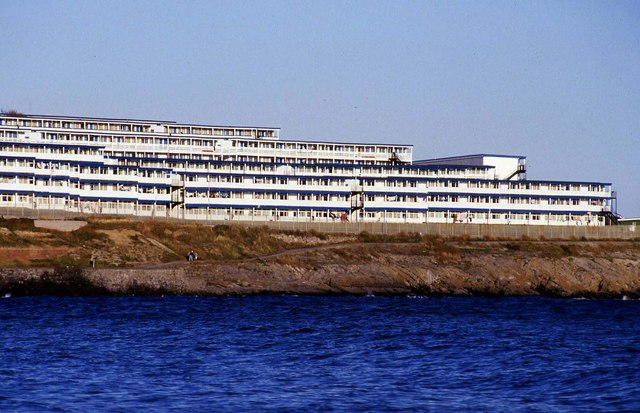

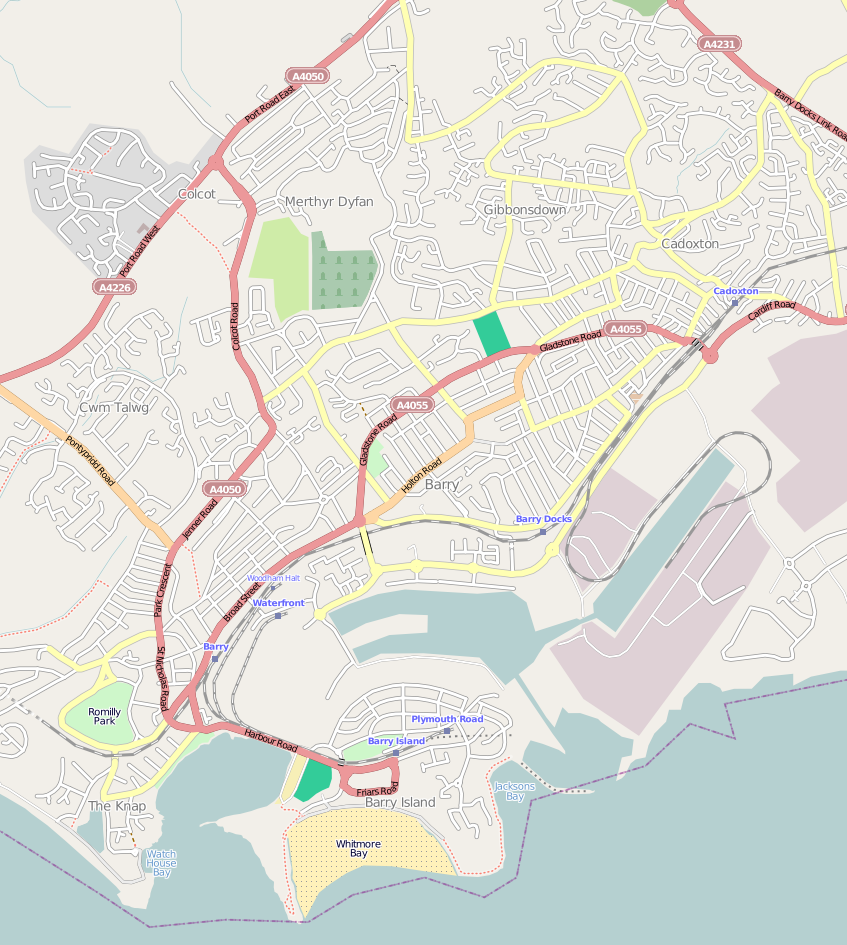
- Location within Barry, Wales
- Location: Barry Island
- Coordinates: 51.390°N 3.268°W
- Subsequent names: Butlins Barry Island (1966–1986); Majestic Barry Island (1987–?); Barry Island Resort (?–1996)
- Established: 18 June 1966
- Closed: 7 November 1996

Barry Island was a Butlin's (and later a Majestic Holidays) holiday camp located on Barry Island in Wales. It opened in 1966 and closed in 1996.

== History ==
Barry Island (Welsh: Ynys y Barri) is a small seaside resort in the Bristol Channel (Môr Hafren) about 9 miles (14 km) south by south west of Cardiff, (Welsh: Caerdydd), south Wales. Until 1896, when a rail link was completed from the mainland, the only access to Barry Island was either by foot across the sand and mud at low tide, or, when the tide was in, by Yellow Funnel Line paddle steamer. Over 150,000 visitors were recorded arriving one August Bank Holiday weekend, mostly by train. Further tourist attractions were developed on the island, and by 1934, the number of visitors to the fairground during the August Bank Holiday week was over 400,000.

== Butlins ==
Billy Butlin's inspiration for his holiday empire came from a less than happy holiday to Barry Island in his youth, when he'd been locked out of his B&B all day by his landlady. He finally decided to build one of the Butlins Holiday Camps at Barry Island.

What was to become the last-built and smallest of the Butlins Holiday Camps came to Barry Island in 1965. Billy Butlin took out a 99-year lease on the headland at Nell's Point in 1966. Building work began there in the winter and the gates opened to campers on 18 June 1966.

Barry Island holiday camp contained all the tried and tested Butlins ingredients: the famous Butlins Redcoats, funfair, early morning wake up with Radio Butlin, dining hall, indoor and outdoor swimming pools, ballroom; boating lake, tennis courts, sports field (for the three legged and egg and spoon races and the donkey derby), table tennis and snooker tables, amusement arcade, medical centre, theatre, arcades of shops and the Pig and Whistle Showbar. A 430-metre (1,410 ft) chairlift system was opened in 1967. There were 800 basic, 'no-frills' chalets, designed to modern 1960s standards, which, on the outside, meant wooden panels and flat roofs.

The camp continued to be enormously successful throughout until the 1980s, but on 29 October 1986, Butlins announced that it would have no place in the company's future and would close after Christmas, and it did so on 31 December 1986.

== Majestic Holidays ==
The camp was sold to Majestic Holidays and re-opened on 23 May 1987 as Majestic Barry Island (later renamed The Barry Island Resort). Majestic Holidays' plans to demolish the camp and rebuild the site did not reach fruition though the camp was given a complete refurbishment, including refurbishing swimming pools. Majestic Holidays continued to use the Redcoats until 1989 but they became the Bluecoats in 1991, following Butlins threat of legal action over the name.

Maintenance had now become such an issue, especially with the chalet's flat roofs and wooden panelling, that a clause was added to the booking conditions limiting refunds to 20% of the cost of the holiday. Following numerous complaints over the camp, the BBC show That's Life! investigated. The report aired in January 1989 and the report said "It's Barry Awful, It's Barry Hell" and the presenter at the end said "If you're off to Barry Island this summer, send us a postcard." They did! By the end of the summer of 1989, That's Life had received 8,000 postcards in praise of the camp, with only about 40 complaints. Majestic Holidays' owner, Rick Wright, sued and Majestic received £500,000 damages.

By 1996, with storm damage causing more maintenance problems, Vale of Glamorgan Council threatened to refuse renewal of Barry Island Resort's entertainments licence, unless work was carried out to improve the now 30-year-old site. Majestic's now trading company, Insurebowls Ltd, continued through the summer, but closed the camp for good on 7 November 1996, although they had originally intended to reopen the following year.

== Closure ==
The holiday camp site was sold for £2.25m to Vale of Glamorgan Council, in October 1997, who demolished the camp and sold it to Bovis Homes for housing development. Now known as Bryn Llongwr, houses were built on the site between 2002 and 2003, with the remaining two original camp buildings and outdoor pool being demolished in early 2005.

On 27 September 2014, the Mayor of The Vale of Glamorgan, Councillor Howard Hamilton, unveiled a blue plaque in the new 'Seafront Garden', part of a £3,000,000 refurbishment of the coastline round Nells Point. The plaque, designed by former AEM, Steuart Kingsley-Inness and paid for by him and former Barry Redcoats, was dedicated to the late Entertainments Manager, John Wilson, it commemorates the Butlins Holiday Camp and its operator, showman and philanthropist Sir William 'Billy' Butlin. Sir Billy's widow, Sheila, Lady Butlin, sent a letter expressing her delight at this tribute to her husband and "one of his favourite camps."

== Film and television appearances ==
Between Butlins' closure and Majestic's reopening the camp was used for filming scenes in the "Shangri-La" holiday camp from the Doctor Who serial Delta and the Bannermen. Filming took place between 24 June – 8 July 1987
