= Senghenydd railway station =

Disused railway station in Senghenydd, Caerphilly

Senghenydd

General information
- Location: Senghenydd, Glamorgan; Wales
- Coordinates: 51.6094°N 3.2808°W
- Grid reference: ST114908
- Platforms: 2

Other information
- Status: Disused

History
- Original company: Rhymney Railway
- Pre-grouping: Rhymney Railway
- Post-grouping: Great Western Railway

Key dates
- 1 February 1894: Opened as Senghenith
- 1 July 1904: Name changed to Senghenydd
- 15 June 1964: Closed
Location

Senghenydd railway station served the town of Senghenydd, in the historic county of Glamorgan, Wales, from 1894 to 1964 on the Senghenydd branch of the Rhymney Railway.

== History ==
The station was opened as Senghenith on 1 February 1894 by the Rhymney Railway, although it was shown as Senghenydd on the opening paper. Its name was changed to Senghenydd on 1 July 1904. It closed on 15 June 1964.

Preceding station	Disused railways	Following station
Terminus	Rhymney Railway	Windsor Colliery Halt; Line and station closed
