= Barry Island =

Barry Island Welsh: Ynys y Barri
- District and seaside resort
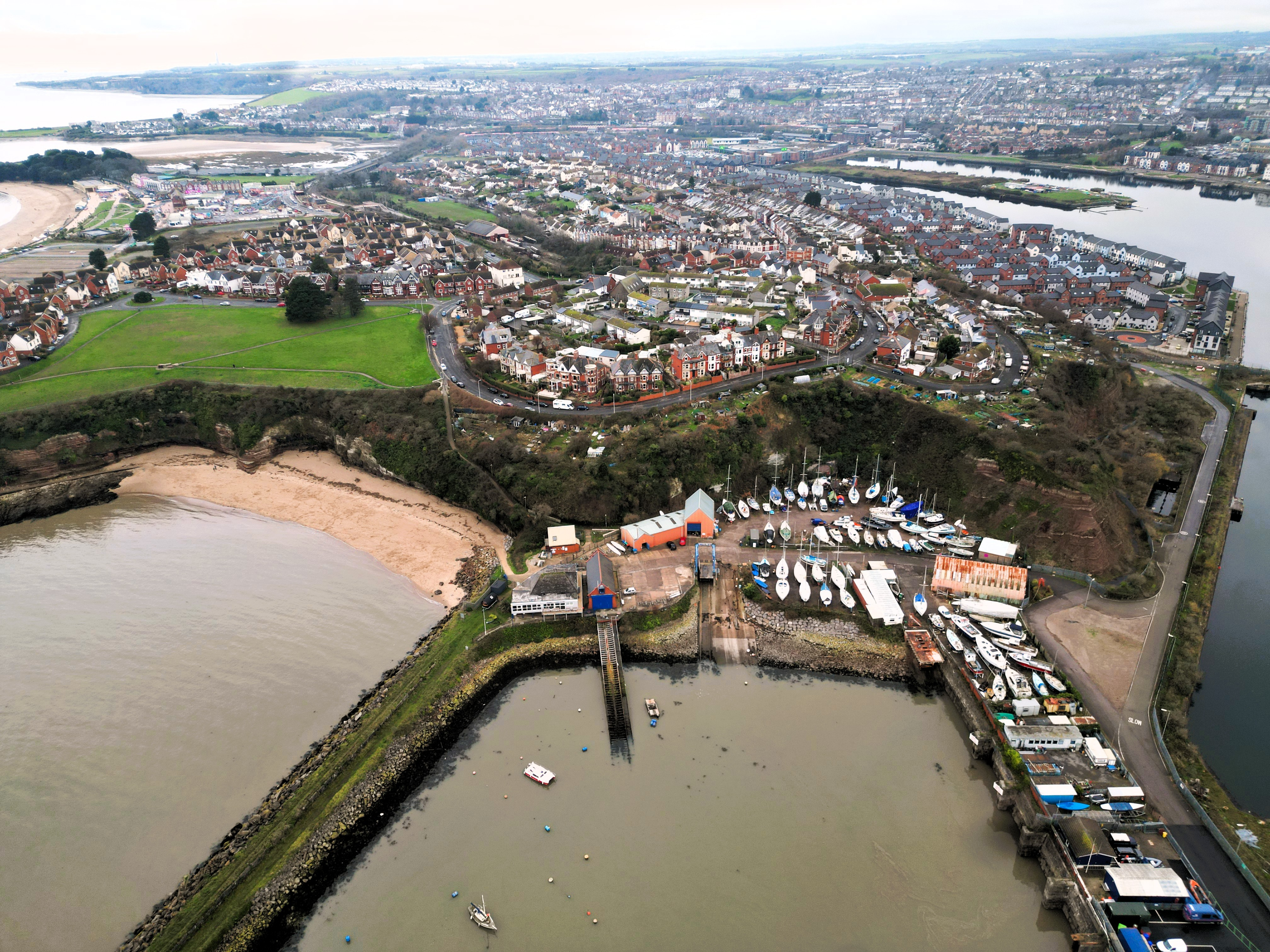
- Aerial view of Barry Island

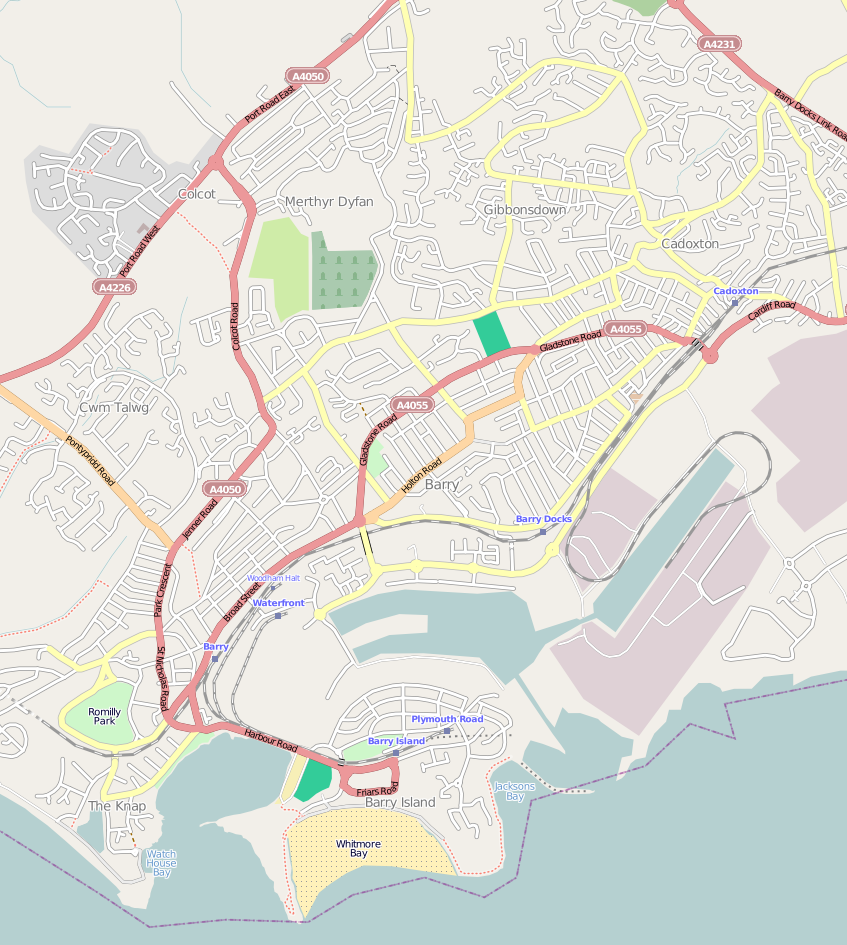
- Location in the Vale of Glamorgan
- Coordinates: 51°23′31.2″N 3°16′29.4″W
- Country: United Kingdom
- Region: Wales
- County borough: Vale of Glamorgan
- Town: Barry
- Historic county: Glamorgan
- Time zone: UTC+0 (GMT)
- Post codes: CF62
- Area code: 01446

Barry Island (Welsh: Ynys y Barri) is a district, peninsula and seaside resort, forming part of the town of Barry in the Vale of Glamorgan, South Wales. It is named after the 6th century Saint Baruc. Barry's stretch of coast, on the Bristol Channel, has the world's second highest tidal range of 15 metres (49 ft), second only to the Bay of Fundy in Nova Scotia, Atlantic Canada.

The peninsula was an island until the 1870s when it was linked to the mainland as the town of Barry expanded. This was partly due to the opening of Barry Docks by the Barry Railway Company. Established by David Davies, the docks now link up the gap which used to isolate Barry Island.

Although Barry Island used to be home to a Butlins Holiday Camp, it is now known more for its beach and Barry Island Pleasure Park. It was used as a setting of the BBC TV shows Gavin & Stacey and Being Human.

== History ==
=== Prehistoric origins ===
The area around Barry Island shows extensive evidence of human occupation. Mesolithic or Middle Stone Age microlith flint tools have been found at Friars Point on Barry Island and near Wenvoe, and Neolithic or New Stone Age polished stone axe-heads were discovered in St. Andrews Major. As the area was heavily wooded and movement would have been restricted, it is likely that people also came to what was to become Wales by boat, apparently from the Iberian Peninsula. They cleared the forests to establish pasture and to cultivate the land.

These neolithic colonists, who integrated with the indigenous people, gradually changed from being hunter-gatherers to settled farmers. They built the long barrows at St Lythans and Tinkinswood, which date to around 6,000 BP, only 3 miles (4.8 km) and 4 miles (6.4 km) to the north of Barry Island, respectively.

In common with the people living all over Great Britain, over the following centuries the local population assimilated immigrants and exchanged ideas of the Bronze Age and Iron Age Celtic cultures. Together with much of South Wales, Barry Island was settled by a Celtic British tribe called the Silures. There have been five Bronze Age burial mounds, or cairns, recorded on Friars Point.

=== Roman and medieval eras ===
Although the Roman occupation saw significant Romano-British settlements at both Barry and Llandough, there is little physical evidence of Roman activity on Barry Island itself. However, the island would flourish as a religious community, following the end of Roman rule.

In the Post-Roman era, the Glamorgan coast became an important centre of early Celtic Christianity. Indeed, the Book of Llandaff defined the ancient diocese of Llandaff as stretching "as far as the island Terthi" (with Terthi being an earlier name for Barry island).

The island is said to have got its current name in the 6th century when Cattwg Ddoeth (Saint Cadoc, an important tutor of many Welsh saints including Illtud) spent seven years living as a hermit on the nearby Ynys Echni (Flat Holm). Upon arrival at Ynys Echni, it was discovered that one of Cattwg's disciples had not brought all the texts that Cattwg required for his stay. Cattwg requested that this disciple travel back to the mainland to fetch them. The disciple, Barrwg drowned on this return journey, and was buried on the island that would become known as Ynys y Barri.

The Vikings launched raids in the area and Barry Island was known to be a raider base in 1087.

=== Gerallt Gymro ===
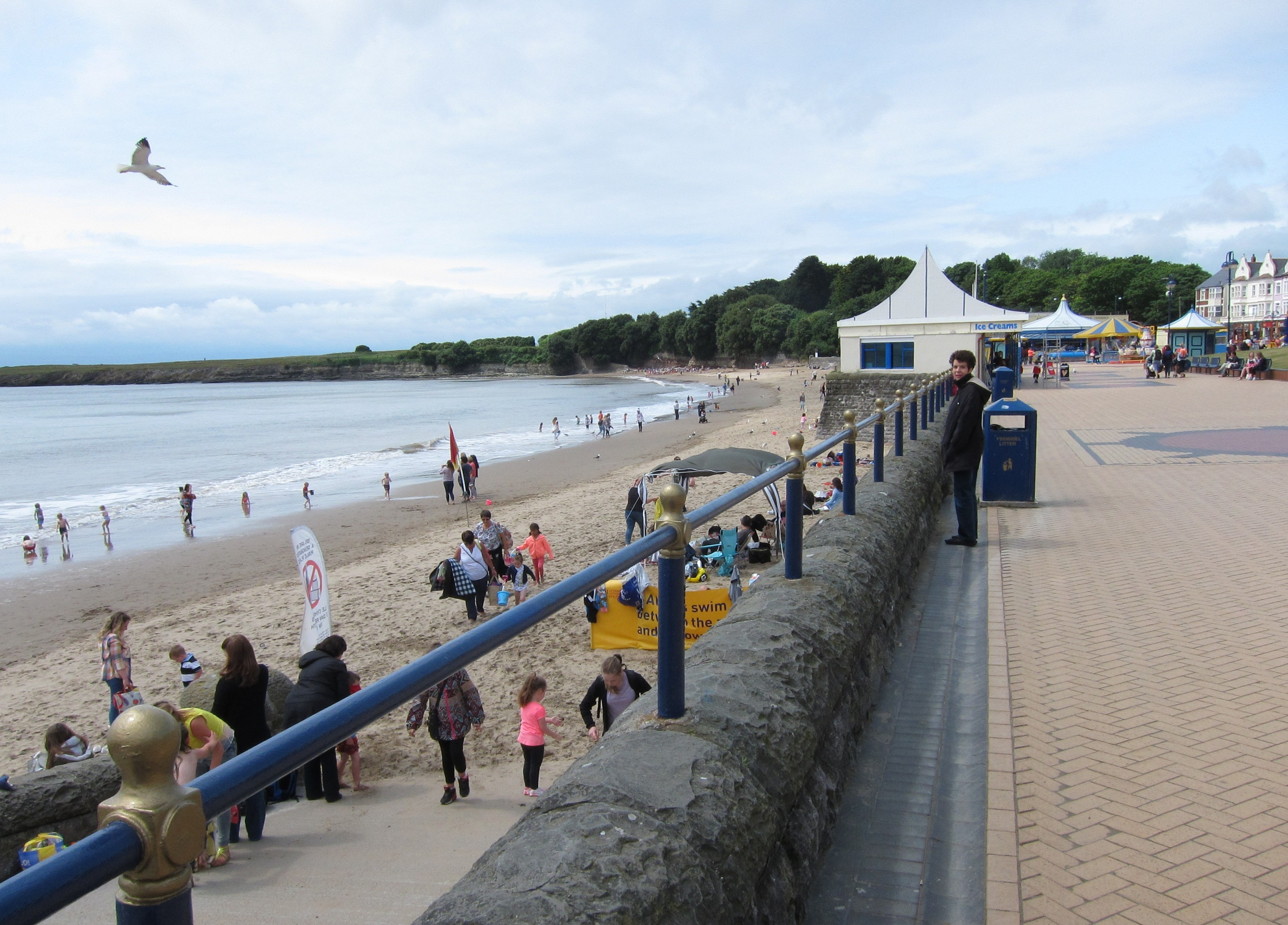
The beach at Whitmore Bay, looking west. Taken 2015.

The Norman/Welsh chronicler Father Gerallt Gymro (c.1146 – c.1223) described the origin of his family name in his The Itinerary of Archbishop Baldwin through Wales (also known as The Journey through Wales). Gerallt Gymro, also known in French: Gerald de Barri, Latin: Giraldus Cambrensis and Gerald of Wales, wrote:

Not far from Caerdyf (sic) is a small island situated near the shore of the Severn, called Barri, from St. Baroc, who formerly lived there, and whose remains are deposited in a chapel overgrown with ivy, having been transferred to a coffin. From hence a noble family, of the maritime parts of South Wales, who owned this island and the adjoining estates, received the name of de Barri.

Going on to describe the island's well, he wrote:

It is remarkable that, in a rock near the entrance of the island, there is a small cavity, to which, if the ear is applied, a noise is heard like that of smiths at work, the blowing of bellows, strokes of hammers, grinding of tools, and roaring of furnaces; and it might easily be imagined that such noises, which are continued at the ebb and flow of the tides, were occasioned by the influx of the sea under the cavities of the rocks.

Local legend explains the phenomenon as the ghost of a local hero called Benedict y Diffoddwr, or in English 'Benedict the Fighter'. It is said that when his ship, the Tam Lyn, was overrun by pirating Spaniards he almost single-handedly fought and killed the entire body of pirates even after they had slaughtered his entire crew. He then managed to sail his ship back to port on his own where he was heralded as a hero. They say after many other voyages during which, it is rumoured, he fought off many other pirates (source unverifiable), he eventually died when he was caught in a great storm on the coast, during which his ship was irreparably damaged and sank to the bottom of the ocean. The locals who believe the legend of Benedict claim that their defender still lingers in the rocky areas on the south coast, protecting the inhabitants from foreign invaders.

The 1908 Everyman edition contains a brief description of Barry Island by the Benedictine monk Hugh Paulinus de Cressy (c. 1605–1674):

Barri Island is situated on the coast of Glamorganshire; and, according to Cressy, took its name from St. Baruc, the hermit, who resided, and was buried there. The Barrys in Ireland, as well as the family of Giraldus, who were lords of it, are said to have derived their names from this island. John Leland, in speaking of this island, says, "The passage into Barrey isle at ful se is a flite shot over, as much as the Tamise is above the bridge. At low water, there is a broken causey to go over, or els over the shalow streamelet of Barrey-brook on the sands. The isle is about a mile in cumpace, and hath very good corne, grasse, and sum wood; the ferme of it worth aio a yere. There ys no dwelling in the isle, but there is in the middle of it a fair little chapel of St Barrok, where much pilgrimage was usid."

Ernest Rhys, the editor, adds in 1908: "The 'fair little chapel' has disappeared, and 'Barry Island' is now, since the construction of the great dock, connected with the mainland, it is covered with houses, and its estimated capital value is now £250,000."

=== Modern times ===
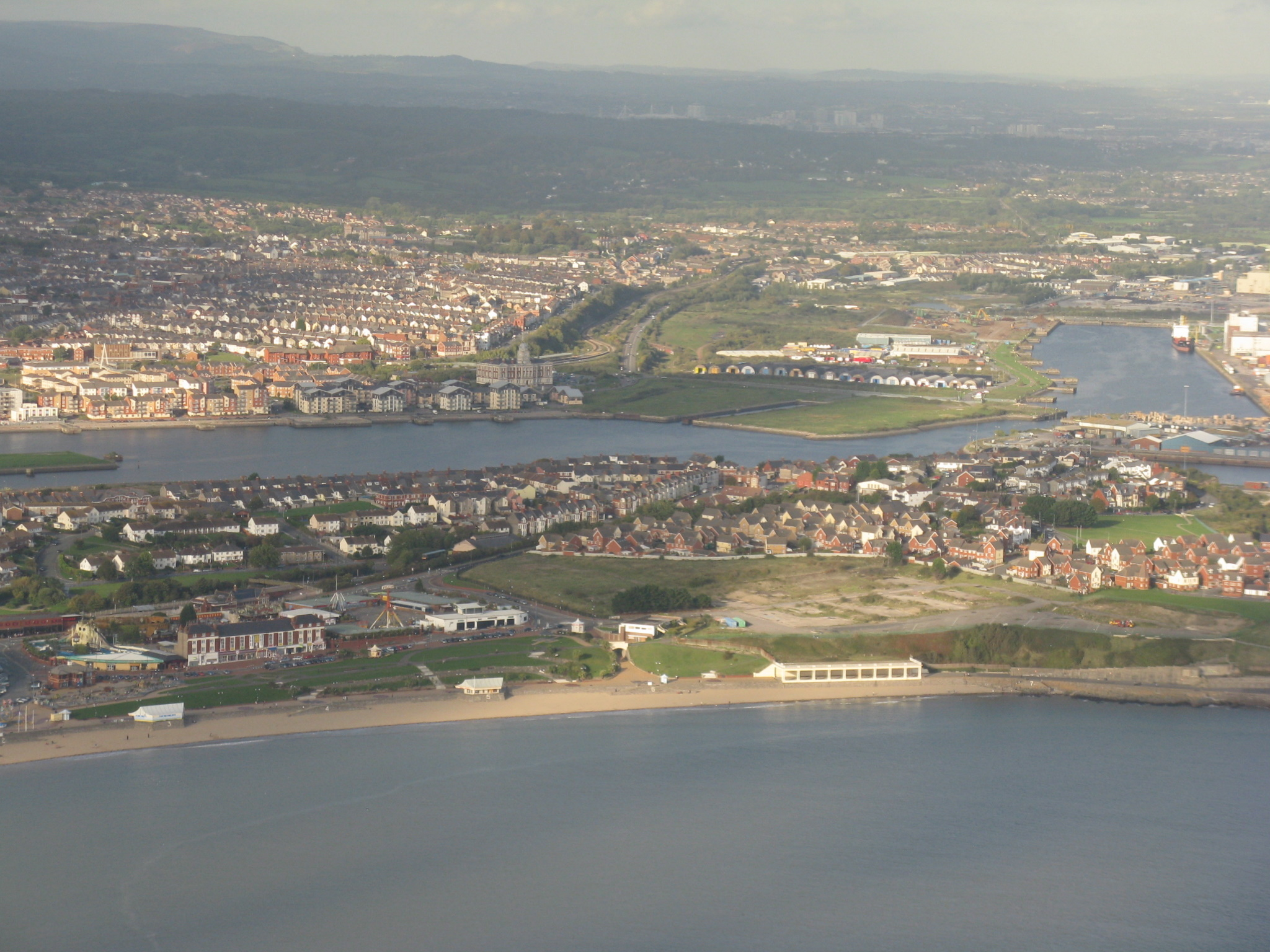
View across the island and docks

Industrial and tourist developments began in the mid-19th century, for example Friars Point House. Until 1896, when a rail link with the mainland via a 250-yard long causeway was completed, the only access to Barry Island had been either on foot across the sand and mud at low tide, or when the tide was in, by ferry from the shore at the Old Harbour. Barry Island railway station is the terminus of Network Rail's Barry Branch and connects with the main line and various Valley lines at Cardiff, about 9 miles (14 km) north, north-east of Barry. Further tourist attractions were developed on the island, and by 1934 the number of visitors to the fairground during the August Bank Holiday week was over 400,000.

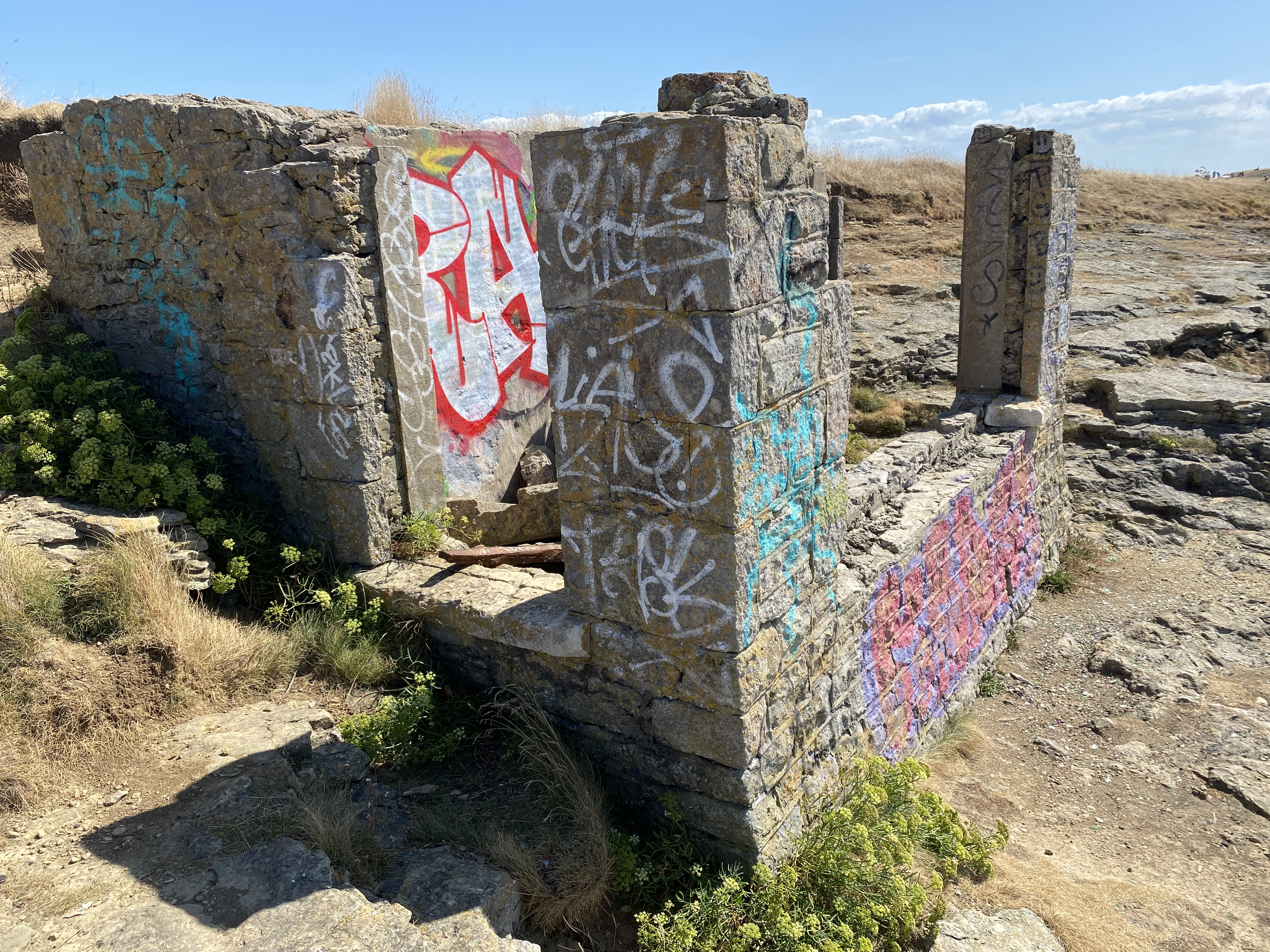
Ruins of a coastal structure covered in graffiti

British champion rollerblader and Barry native Rich Taylor died after a skating accident in a Barry street on 2 August 2004.

On 25 July 2008, Radio 1 featured Barry Island in one of their summer events, broadcasting a special edition of The Scott Mills Show live from the island as part of the show's regular "Barryoke" theme, with songs such as "Smooth Barry", a twist on the song "Smooth Criminal" by Michael Jackson with a tour of Barry Island.

In 2012 the Wales Coast Path opened, containing a minor detour in which the path loops around Barry Island before continuing on westwards towards Llantwit Major.

== Governance ==
Barry Island is part of the Baruc electoral ward, which includes Cold Knap and the southwestern part of Barry. It elects councillors to the Vale of Glamorgan Council and Barry Town Council.

== Holiday camp ==
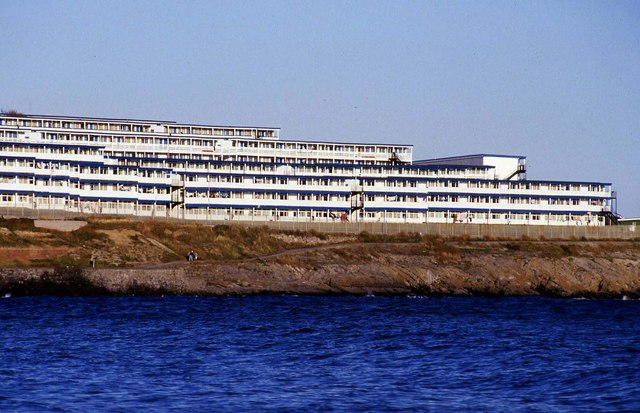
Majestic holiday chalets, demolished 1997 and replaced with housing

Butlins Barry Island was a holiday camp that opened 1966 and closed in 1996, by which time it had been known as The Barry Island Resort for about nine years.

== On film ==
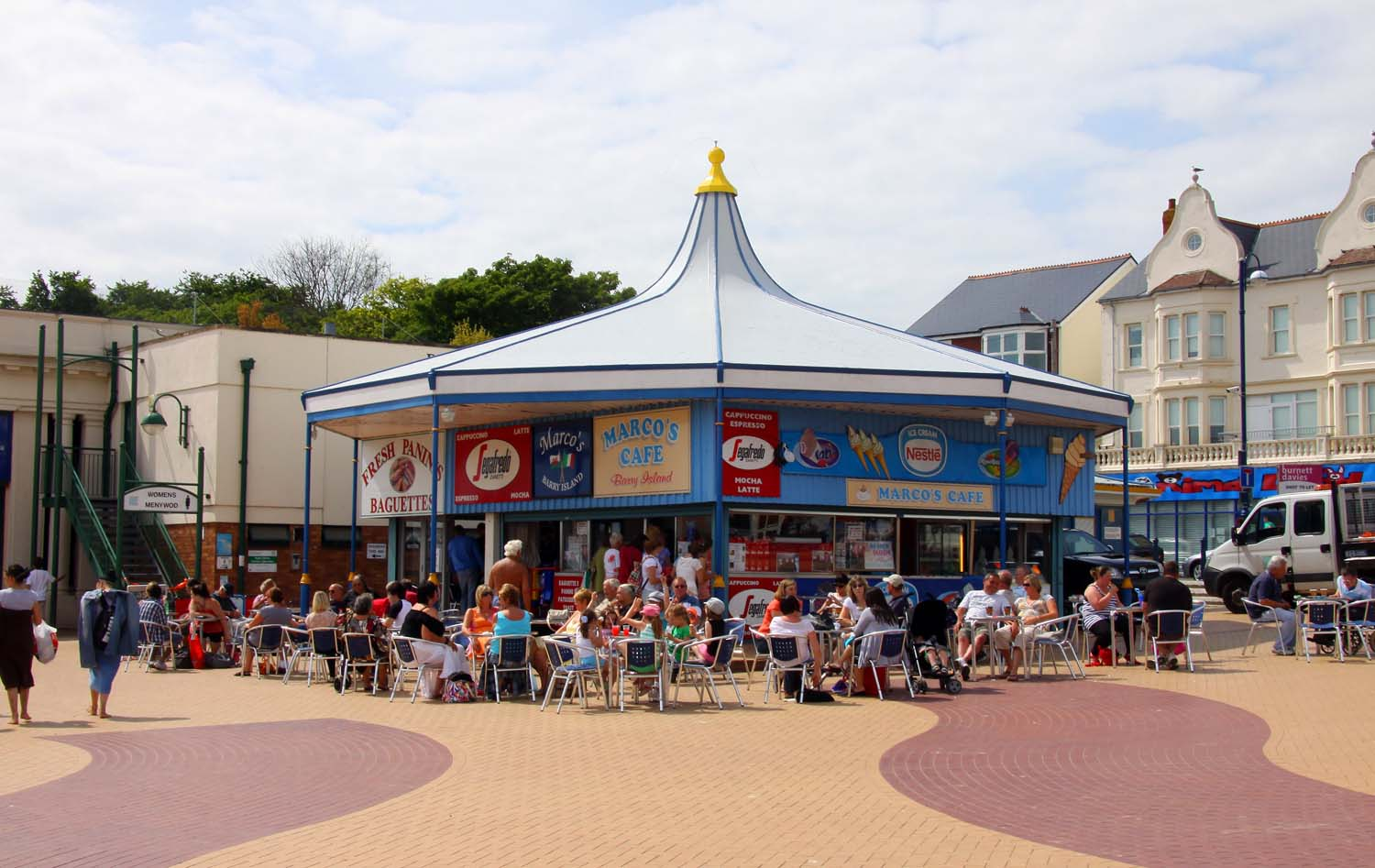
Marco's Cafe, Barry Island, used in Gavin & Stacey

The holiday camp was used to film scenes in the "Shangri-La" holiday camp in the Doctor Who serial Delta and the Bannermen. The island was also a location for Doctor Who in the 2005 series episodes "The Empty Child" and "The Doctor Dances", standing in for a bomb site in 1941 London and the 2014 series episode "Flatline".

The 1987 horror film Bloody New Year filmed its fun fair scenes in the area.

The BBC television series Gavin & Stacey is partly set and filmed on Barry Island; this includes Marco's Café, which is where the character Stacey works.

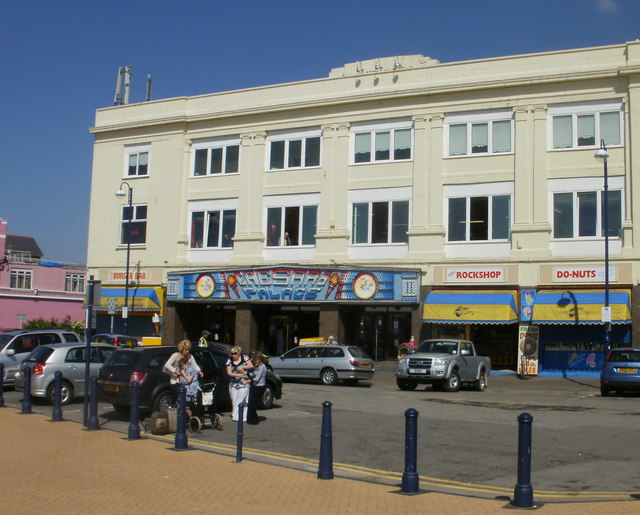
Caesar's Palace

The Island also served as the setting for Pleasure Park on ITV Wales as part of the It's My Shout short film series. Part of the Island including the Pleasure Park was used in the serial The Mad Woman in the Attic, part of the third series of The Sarah Jane Adventures.

The third, fourth and fifth series of the BBC supernatural drama Being Human were set and filmed in Barry (the series being originally set in Bristol until the central characters had to relocate after the second series), and were aired in early 2011, 2012 and 2013 respectively.

The film Submarine was partly filmed in Barry.

"Warship Class" from the 2008 debut album by Silvery is set in Woodham Brothers scrapyard and mentions Barry Island.

Filming for the BBC television comedy Gavin and Stacey: The Finale began in Barry Island in summer 2024. The episode was aired on Christmas Day 2024.
