= Barry Island railway station =

Railway station in Vale of Glamorgan, Wales

Barry Island Welsh: Ynys y Barri
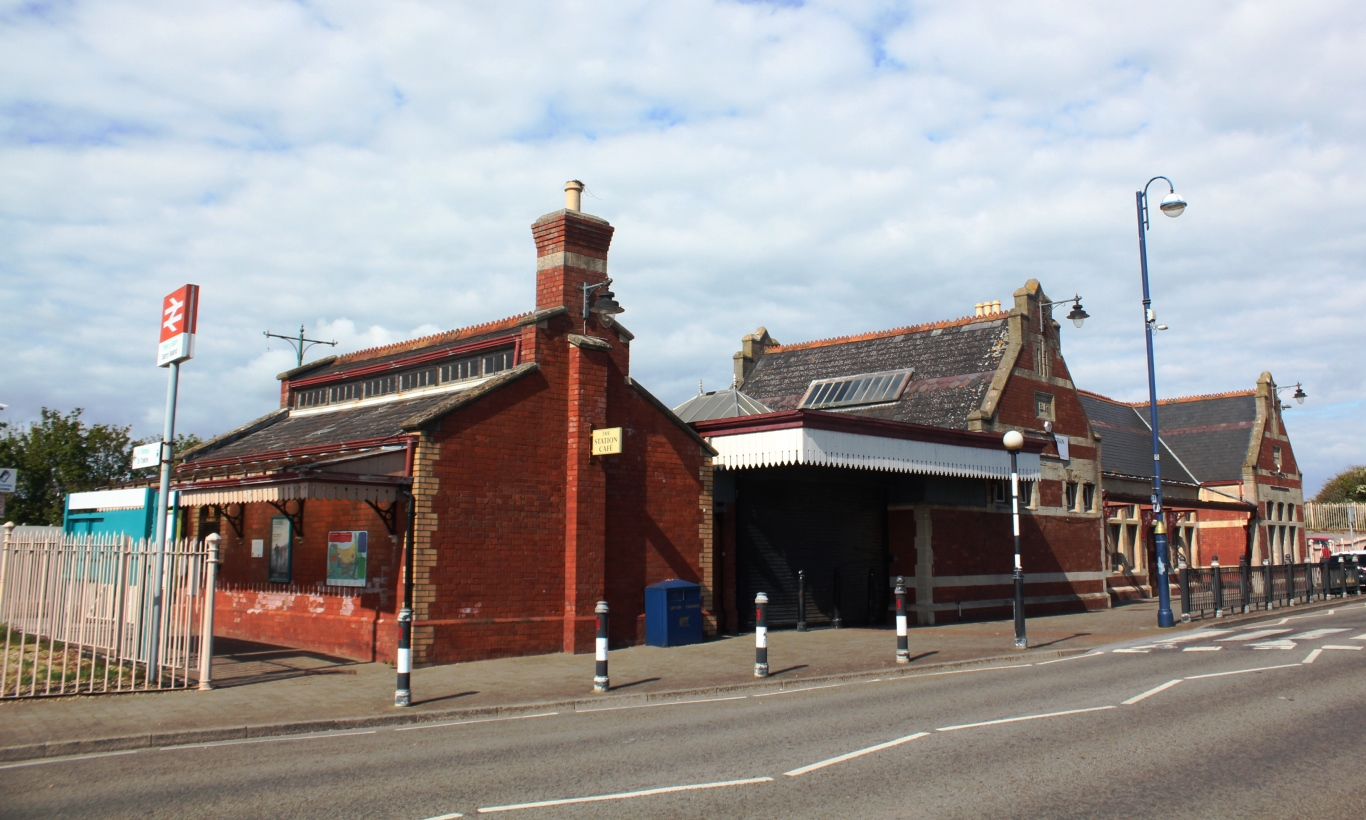

General information
- Location: Barry Island, Vale of Glamorgan; Wales
- Coordinates: 51°23′33″N 3°16′25″W
- Grid reference: ST114666
- Managed by: Transport for Wales
- Platforms: 1

Other information
- Station code: BYI
- Classification: DfT category F1

History
- Opened: 3 August 1896

Passengers
- 2020/21: ▼0.110 million
- 2021/22: ▲0.304 million
- 2022/23: ▲0.368 million
- 2023/24: ▲0.382 million
- 2024/25: ▲0.446 million
Location
Notes
- Passenger statistics from the Office of Rail and Road

Barry Island railway station is a railway station, 9 1/4 miles (14.9 km) south-west of Cardiff Central, serving Barry Island (Welsh: Ynys y Barri) in South Wales. The station has been the terminus – and only remaining active station at the end of the Barry branch of the Cardiff Central to Barry Island line since the closure of Barry Pier station in 1976, the last passenger working through Barry Island tunnel to the Pier station being an enthusiasts' special in 1973. Previous to that year, only a few revenue-earning workings to meet up with the former P&A Campbell's paddle-steamer trips to Weston-super-Mare or other Somerset/Devon havens, were made following May 1964.

Passenger services, operated by Transport for Wales as part of the Valley Lines network, currently use the first half of platform 1.

== History ==
=== Opening ===
In 1896 the railway line was extended along the newly built raised road causeway from Barry Station onto the island to provide a service to the newly opened and developing Barry Island Pleasure Park day tripper leisure facilities. The Barry Island station opened in time for the August Bank holiday 1896. The new rail line also crossed to the Island at road level and consequently a level crossing was needed where the line crossed Plymouth Road. When premises on Station Approach Road (formerly Roman Well Road) were being renovated in the late 1990s, traces of the original track were discovered in the basement.

To give improved passenger access to the P & A Campbell's White Funnel steamers that plied the Bristol Channel in 1899, the line was continued past Barry Island station through a 280-yard double-line tunnel to the new Barry Pier railway station.

=== Peak years ===
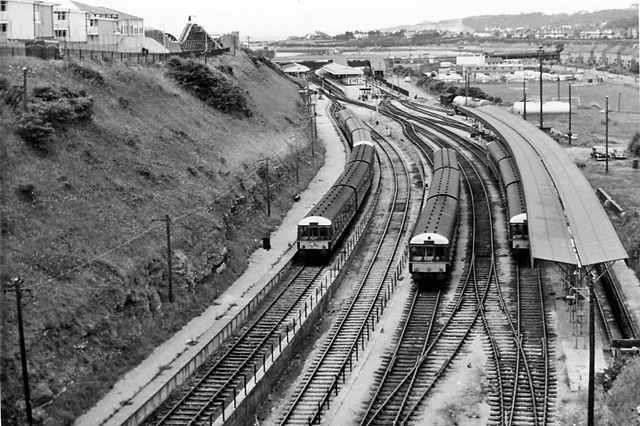
Diesel railcar depot and terminus looking towards the station in 1966.

The peak years for passenger numbers at Barry Island were in the 1920s and 1930s. From 1924 on most peak-time August Bank Holiday Mondays between 80,000 and 100,000 visitors arrived at the Island and mostly by train.

After the 1926 General Strike, reports in the local and national press described the scenes over the 1927 August Bank Holiday weekend at Barry Island as 'organised chaos' . It was estimated that in excess of 120,000 arrived at the island with packed trains arriving and leaving Barry Island Station at five-minute intervals. In excess of 75 special excursion trains, each carrying an estimated 500-600 passengers arrived from Cardiff's Riverside Station during that morning and early afternoon.

A report in the local press on one Bank Holiday Monday, when an estimated crowd of over 150,000 arrived at the Island, described the scene as follows - "When it was time for visitors to leave the Island a queue started to form just before 6 pm and by 9.30 pm was still over a quarter of a mile long, it snaked around the fairground with people waiting to board their trains. Excursionists from the Midlands and places other than Cardiff and the Valleys using one entrance and boarding their non-stop return trains and "Locals" having to wait for a space to return to Cardiff."

In 1927 the GWR decided to issue special day return tickets from Cardiff General (Riverside) at one shilling each (5 new pence) and sold over 82,000 tickets. Demand during the morning was so great that temporary ticket booths had to be set up at the Riverside concourse to cope with the high level of sales. Additional trains and rolling stock were quickly laid on, over and above the planned timetable, to transport the additional visitors to Barry Island. By 12 noon, the station ticket office totally ran out of tickets and were forced to use hand amended tickets that had been dated for the following day.

=== Decline ===
Traffic levels started to fall in the 1950s and 1960s with the spread of greater car ownership in the UK, especially after the Severn Bridge opened in 1966. A further sudden drop occurred between 1968 and 1970 with the closure of the former Taff Vale Railway branch line between Penarth and Cadoxton, Biglis Junction in 1968, the former of which had served through traffic to Cadoxton from Cardiff via Penarth. In its final period of passenger use, the line south of Penarth was operated using a single car DMU from Penarth to Cadoxton only. The through route at Penarth station had been permanently blocked by buffer stops between the Cardiff end of the station and Cadoxton end whence the line at Biglis junction merged with the direct Cardiff via Dinas Powys main line to Barry Island. The wholesale closure of rural rail links all over the country accelerated the switch to private car use by holidaymakers.

=== Station layout ===
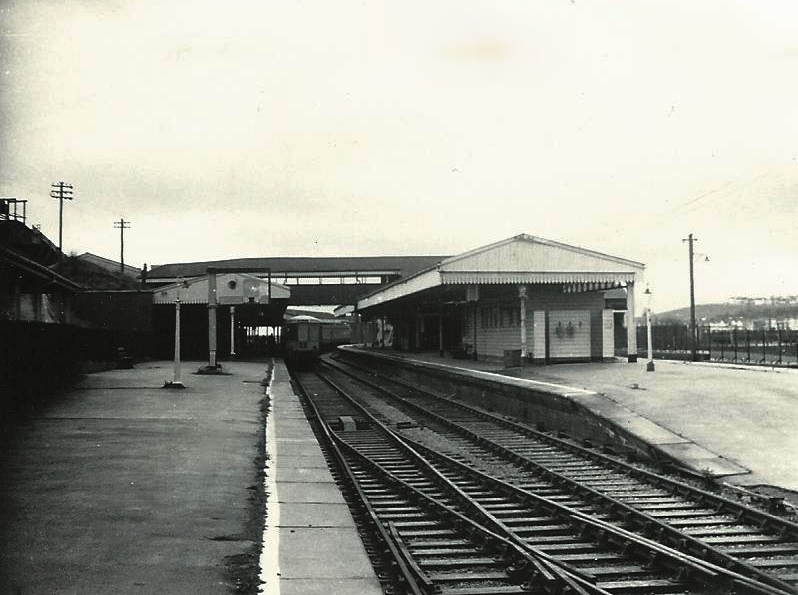
Platforms 2 and 3 in 1967

In its heyday (prior to the early 1960s), the station had four operational platforms - one long main platform on the 'up' side divided into 2 sections (numbered 1 & 2, with 2 served by a dead end spur off the through line to Barry Pier) and an island platform on the 'down' side (numbered 3 & 4). There were also several carriage sidings at the east end of the station opposite platform 2, with a signal box at each end of the station to control the layout. The 'East' ’box was closed in 1964 and replaced by two groundframes, "A" and "B", "A" being housed in a ground-level cabin, and bearing single-line token apparatus for any workings over the single tunnel line to Barry Pier but with the former 'West' ’box taking over responsibility for the passenger service to & from the station. The branch from Barry was built as double track, but was singled in 1969. The line between Barry Island station and Barry Pier through the tunnel had been singled to the tunnel's half-way point in 1929 at which point it doubled and then quadrupled into the station platform area at the Pier terminus.

The remaining signal box at the station was damaged by fire in 1976 and was out of service for repairs for more than a year - this coincided with the final closure of the Pier branch and the abolition of platform 2, leaving only 3 platforms in use. The two faces of the island platform were thereafter (especially from 1982 onward - when the carriage sidings and Pier branch were finally lifted) only used during the summer for excursion traffic, with the ’box normally "switched out" and all trains using platform 1. This method of operation continued right up until the ’box was permanently abolished in March 1998, though main line connections to the tracks serving platforms 3 & 4 had been disconnected for some years by this time. Following the closure of the ’box, half of the redundant track through platform 3 was lifted, platform 4 track abandoned and platform 1 track was curtailed at a buffer stop halfway along the platform. Platform 4 track was absorbed into the Barry Tourist Railway's infrastructure and east of the footbridge, all former BR permanent way was eventually removed but with extended track from platform 4 to the BTR Plymouth Rd shed, platform, headshunt and run-around loop for the Tourist Railway's use. The remaining bi-directional single line to and from Barry was henceforth operated using ‘One Train Working’ regulations from Barry Station signal box (since abolished - the branch is now controlled from Wales Railway Operations Centre (WROC) at Canton, Cardiff, whilst the defunct island platform had its footbridge steps to platforms 3 & 4 removed. Platform 4 was subsequently handed over to the Vale of Glamorgan heritage project (see below). In 2012, the station footbridge giving right of way to the public was replaced by a state-of-the-art structure with disabled access facilities but which offers no access to any of the platforms.

=== Vale of Glamorgan Railway ===
The Heritage Vale of Glamorgan Railway Company moved their operations to Barry Island station in 1997 from Cardiff Butetown railway station, now Cardiff Bay railway station when the Cardiff Bay Development Corporation indicated that they had no use for a heritage steam railway in their plans. The heritage railway started operating heritage trains from Barry Island's platform 4, running across the causeway alongside the Network Rail line, before continuing on to a purpose-built single track incline to the new Waterfront terminus at Hood Road at No.1 dock quay level. By 2007, the company had extended their line from a junction on the Barry end of the Causeway to a new halt at Gladstone Bridge alongside Morrisons supermarket, the final intention being to further extend ½ mile to a new terminus alongside the Network Rail Barry Docks station, making their end-to-end main track length two miles.

Following financial cutbacks brought about by the global credit crunch, the Vale of Glamorgan Council withdrew annual grant support for the heritage railway and placed the facilities up for tender. The heritage railway subsequently failed to secure the new lease and were forced to withdraw from Barry Island station in December 2008.

Private transport operator Cambrian Transport subsequently took over the lease in December 2009 and they now run the heritage line as the Barry Tourist Railway which as at January 2018, terminates at Gladstone Bridge halt.

== Services ==
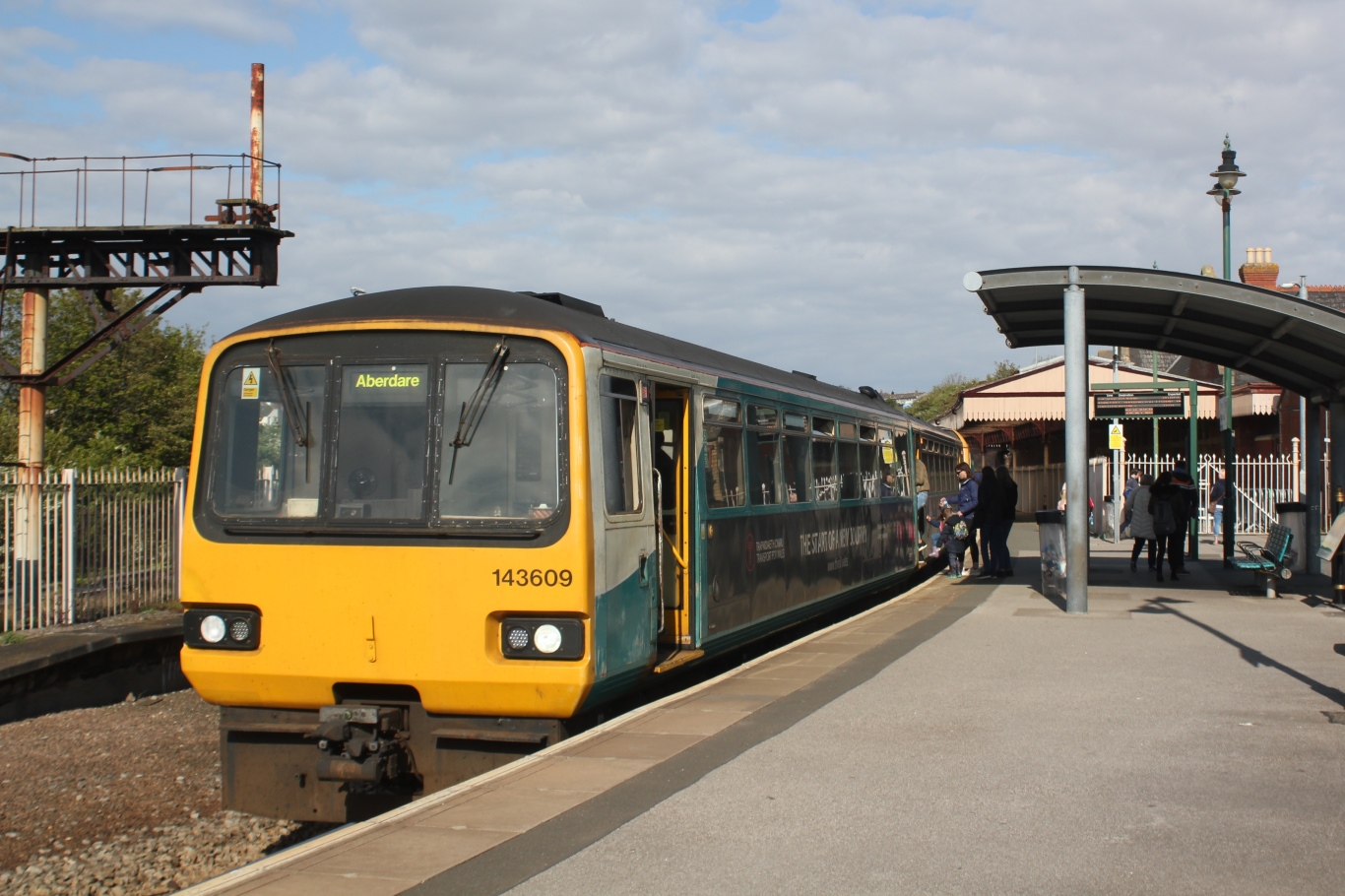
TfW Class 143 with a train to Aberdare

On Mondays-Saturdays, services run all day and serves Rhymney, Bargoed, Ystrad Mynach, and Caerphilly, all running via Cardiff Central/Cardiff Queen Street with 3 trains per hour. The train journey from Barry Island (BYI) to Rhymney (RHY) usually takes about 1 hour and 50 minutes.

On Sundays, the service to Cardiff Central/Queen Street runs approximately half-hourly all day and serves Rhymney, Bargoed, Ystrad Mynach, and Caerphilly. The train journey from Cardiff Queen Street to Barry Island Station typically takes 36 minutes.

The timetable has been changed since June 2024 as part of the South Wales Metro. Trains no longer operate from Barry Island to Merthyr Tydfil and Aberdare. They now operate to Rhymney, Bargoed and Caerphilly.

On Mondays to Saturdays, during daytime hours, three trains per hour operate to Rhymney and Bargoed. Every hour, two trains terminate at Bargoed and one train terminates at Rhymney. The services will be dropped to 2 train per hour in the evening and then hourly from around 8pm.

On Sunday, trains operate half hourly all day and operate to Caerphilly and Rhymney. every hour, one train terminates at Caerphilly and the other train terminates at Rhymney.

Preceding station	National Rail	Following station
Barry	Transport for Wales; Vale Line	Terminus
Preceding station	Heritage railways	Following station
Woodham Halt towards Gladstone Bridge	Barry Tourist Railway Main Line	Plymouth Road Terminus
Waterfront Terminus	Barry Tourist Railway Branch Line	Plymouth Road Terminus
Disused railways
Barry; Line and station open	Barry Railway; Barry-Barry Pier	Barry Pier; Line and station closed

== Media ==
The station appeared in Gavin & Stacey in its own right when Stacey was seen returning to Barry Island from Billericay and in Stella (British TV series) as Pontyberry. Other local stations including Pontypridd railway station also appeared as Pontyberry in the series.

== See also ==
- Barry Island Pleasure Park
