= Meggitt (surname) =

Meggitt is an originally English surname closely related to Meggett. In England, the surname can be traced back to the name Meggot, a female personal name from Old English, which itself is a diminutive of Megg, which is a shortening of Margaret. It may also be related to Scottish locational names from Megget.

Notable people with this surname include:

- Frank Meggitt (1901–1945), Welsh cricketer
- Justin Meggitt, professor of religious studies at Cambridge University
- Margaret Sara Meggitt (1866–1920), British activist
- Mervyn Meggitt (1924–2004), Australian anthropologist
- William Meggitt (1894–1927), British military aviator
