= Meggitt (disambiguation) =

Meggitt is a British engineering business specialising in aerospace equipment.

Meggitt may also refer to:

- Meggitt (surname), a British surname
- Meggitt's algorithm, a mathematical calculation algorithm
