= Llanbradach =

Village in Wales

Coordinates: 51.6032°N 3.2296°W

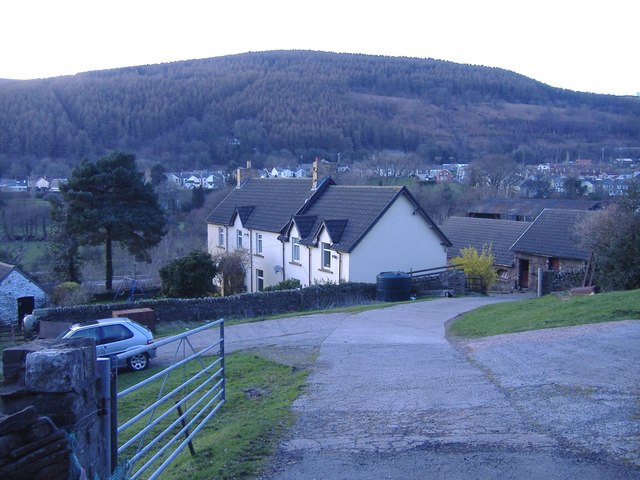

- Location within Caerphilly
- Population: 4,774 (2016)
- OS grid reference: ST149905
- Civil parish: Llanbradach and Pwllypant
- Principal area: Caerphilly
- Preserved county: Gwent
- Country: Wales
- Sovereign state: United Kingdom
- Police: Gwent
- Fire: South Wales
- Ambulance: Welsh

Llanbradach is a village in the county borough of Caerphilly, South Wales. It lies within the historic boundaries of Glamorgan, less than three miles (five kilometres) north of the town of Caerphilly. It is part of the community of Llanbradach and Pwll-y-Pant.

It is mostly residential, and contains three pubs, a primary school, a small local shopping area, a recreation ground, a library, two doctor's surgeries, and a youth centre. Being a traditional long and narrow South Wales Valleys village, its potential for expansion is restricted by the river on its eastern side and the hillside to the west.

The village is served by Llanbradach railway station on the former Rhymney Railway line. The village is twinned with the village of Ploubezre in Brittany.

Llanbradach was used in 2011 as the filming site for funeral home scenes in the comedy-drama Stella.

== Toponymy ==
Ordinarily, "Llan" means church or parish, but in this case the name may come from "Nant Bradach", which means "the banks of river Bradach" ("Bradach" is an Irish word meaning robbing or pilfering). Alternatively, the Welsh word "brad" (treachery or deceit) could have been coupled with the Irish "-ach" suffix (stream or river), creating "a treacherous stream" – possibly one that is prone to sudden, destructive floods. The name is thought to have come into being around 1597. It is usually taken to be a hybrid Welsh and Irish name, Nant-Bradach as above, which would indicate a period long before 1597 (when the Llanbradach Fawr farm and house are mentioned), when the Irish ravaged the Glamorgan coast and the Holms, leaving names around (Rheliw'r Gwyddyl). The flood happened because they built on a floodplain.

== History ==
=== Coal industry ===
Llanbradach Colliery was opened in the 1890s, and reached peak production in the 1930s, but was shut down in 1961. A number of old mine buildings are still visible to the rear of the village.

=== Llanbradach Viaduct ===
The Barry Railway opened its main line from Cadoxton South to Trehafod in the Rhondda valley by 1888, but such was the demand for coal for shipment from Barry docks that they constructed another branch (the Penrhos branch) from Tynycaeau to join the Rhymney Railway at Penrhos, west of Caerphilly and it was opened on 1 August 1901. Demand for coal export increased still further, so the Barry Railway constructed an extension to run from a new Penrhos Lower Junction to join the Brecon & Merthyr Railway at Barry Junction (later Duffryn Isaf Junction) opposite Llanbradach, and that opened on 2 January 1905. That extension circumvented the south-west of Caerphilly, and crossed the Rhymney Valley by means of the Llanbradach or Pwll-y-pant viaduct. The construction of this viaduct, north of Energlyn, was thus crucial to the establishment of the busy coal port at Barry, which dealt with nearly 4000 ships a year at its peak.

The line extension was short-lived: it closed on 4 August 1926 and was decommissioned. It was removed to be sold for scrap by 1938. The Penrhos and Penyrheol viaducts within the extension were removed by 1937. The brick support piers of the Llanbradach viaduct were demolished and their remains left in heaps across the valley for decades; eventually they were removed as part of the modernisation of highways in the area. All that remains of the viaduct is a single brick arch towards the western end of where it ran. A short part of the trackbed can still be seen near Energlyn. The rest of the trackbed was incorporated into the A468 Caerphilly bypass road, south-west of Caerphilly. The line carried on southwards from Penrhos through Ty Rhiw, and on to the Walnut Tree Viaduct, of similar construction, which itself was largely dismantled in 1969. There were no formal passenger stations along this stretch but it did see some summer passenger excursion traffic to Barry Island as late as 1961.

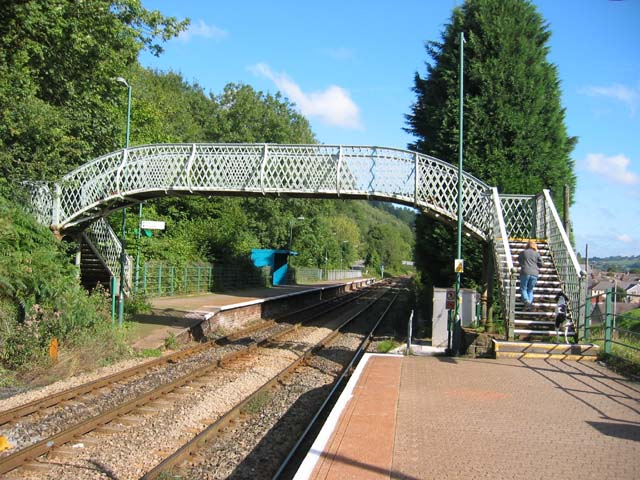
Llanbradach railway station

All that remains of the Walnut Tree viaduct are an abutment, an angled pillar and the Taff Bank pier. The last of these was used in 1977 for the display of messages of goodwill for the Silver Jubilee of Queen Elizabeth. Most of the remaining trackbed north of Walnut Tree Taff's Well is now incorporated into the Taff Trail. The remaining Cadoxton Junction–Trehafod Junction (latterly Trefforest Junction) route, former Barry Railway's main line, also closed as a result of the Tynycaeau incident in 1963.

=== Workmen's Welfare Hall and Institute ===
The original Llanbradach Workmen's Institute, a miners' institute built in the 1900s, was constructed of timber and corrugated iron, and previously fulfilled the functions of village hall, school and a place for religious gatherings. A committee was set up in 1910 to organise the replacement of the old structure with a modern stone building. The new building was opened in 1913, and among the amenities available to the workmen were a snooker room, a small cinema, and a reading room and library.

The hall remained in use until at least the early 1980s (albeit in a declining state). It housed the village library, a billiards room, possibly a boxing gym and theatrical productions by the local Coed-Y-Brain school. It was demolished at some point around the turn of the 21st century and the site is now a car park.

== Governance ==
At the most local level, Llanbradach elects eight community councillors to serve on Llanbradach and Pwll-y-pant Community Council.

Llanbradach was an electoral ward to Mid Glamorgan County Council from 1989 until the council's dissolution in 1996. It subsequently became a ward for Caerphilly County Borough Council, electing two county councillors.

== Sports ==
A football club, Llanbradach AFC, was founded in 1986. Until its collapse in 2015, the senior team played in the South Wales Alliance leagues. The team reassembled in 2017 and are play in the Taff-Ely and Rhymney Valley League Division One. The club also trains local boys and girls from under 6 years of age and upwards.

Rugby union, netball, bowls, and hockey are other popular sports in the locality.

== Notable residents ==
- Rodger Gifford (born 1948), former FA Premier League and FIFA football referee
- Neil Jones, founding member of the band Amen Corner
