= Radyr =

Suburb of Cardiff, Wales

Coordinates: 51.51°N 3.26°W

Radyr: Welsh: Radur
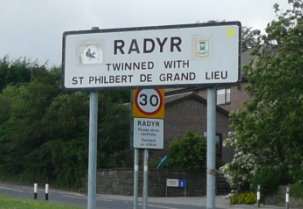
- Radyr street sign

- Location within Cardiff
- OS grid reference: ST1380
- Community: Radyr and Morganstown
- Principal area: Cardiff
- Preserved county: Cardiff
- Country: Wales
- Sovereign state: United Kingdom
- Post town: Cardiff
- Postcode district: CF15
- Dialling code: 029
- Police: South Wales
- Fire: South Wales
- Ambulance: Welsh
- UK Parliament: Cardiff West
- Senedd Cymru – Welsh Parliament: Cardiff West

Radyr (Welsh: Radur; Welsh pronunciation: [ˈradɪr]) is an outer suburb of Cardiff, about 4 miles (6.4 km) northwest of Cardiff city centre. Radyr is part of Radyr and Morganstown Community, for which the 2011 Census recorded a population of 6,417.

Morganstown is north of Radyr, on the other side of the M4 Motorway. Neighbouring communities are Whitchurch to the east on the opposite bank of the River Taff, Pentyrch to the west with St Fagans and Llandaff to the south.

== History ==
=== Stone Age until the Norman Conquest ===
Evidence of Stone Age occupation of the Lesser Garth Cave near Morganstown was discovered in 1912 and included worked flints. In 1916 excavation of a mound of 30 metres (100 ft) in Radyr Woods revealed charcoal and Iron Age pottery. Radyr developed after the Norman invasion of Wales at the start of the 12th century and formed part of the Welsh Lordship or cantref of Miskin under the Lordship of Glamorgan created by the Norman King, William Rufus, in 1093.

=== Origin of the name ===
Hints about the derivation of the name Radyr can be found in Lifris's writings Life of St Cadog, written between 1081 and 1104 but relating to the earlier period around AD 530, which mentions a croft or tref on the site called Aradur Hen. Lifris also tells the story of Tylyway, a hermit who was held to have lived on the banks of the Taff. Tylyway's cell is the most likely origin of the name Radyr; from the Welsh yr adur, meaning "the chantry", although Arudur Hen is also possible.

=== Norman occupation and Middle Ages ===
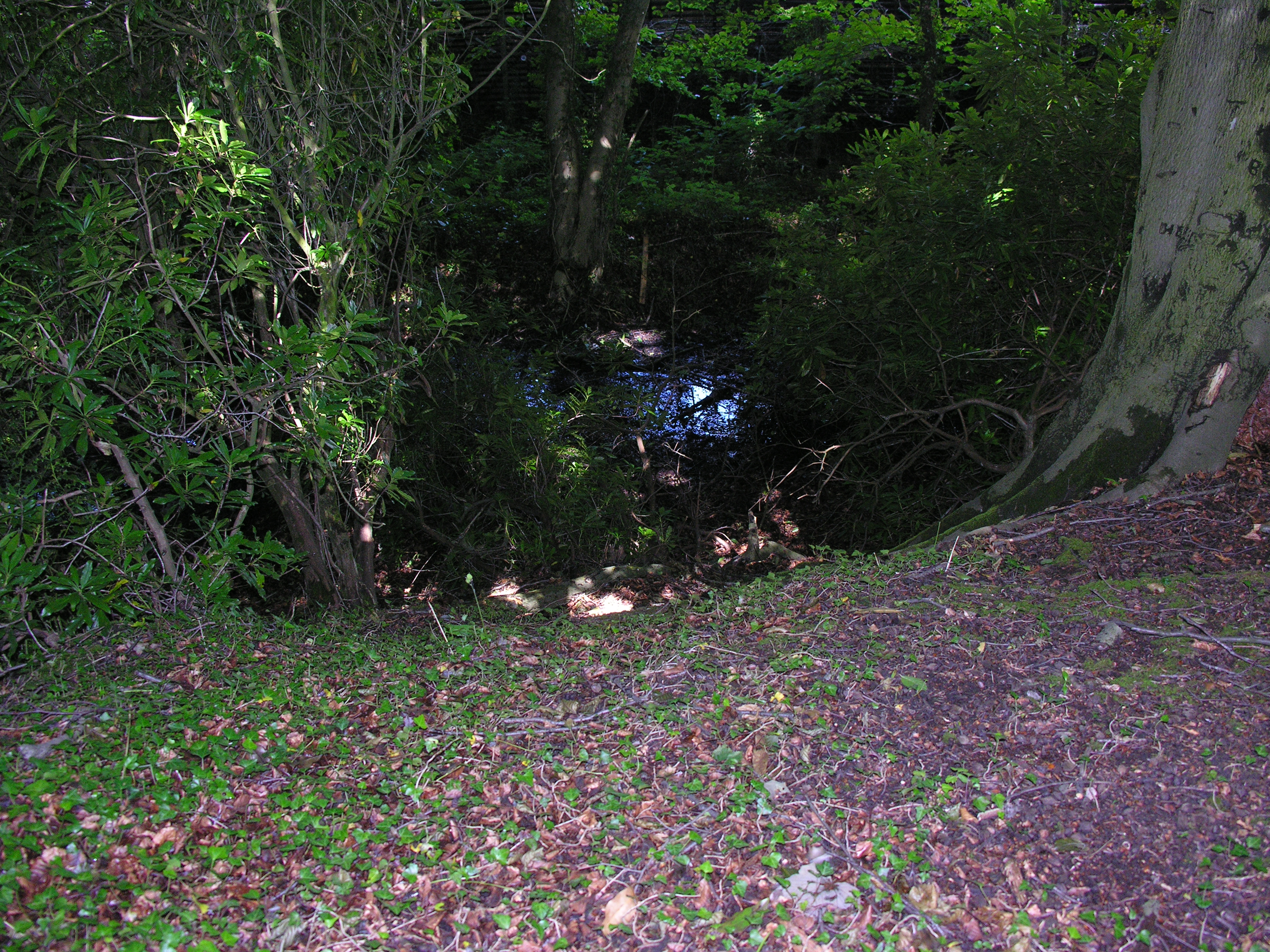
Radyr motte and moat viewed from top

The Norman motte in the "mound field" is a flat-topped mound 30 metres (100 ft) in diameter at the base and 3.8 metres (12 ft) high, surrounded by a ditch 7 metres (23 ft) wide. An adjoining bailey to east of the motte could indicate the boundary between Norman and Welsh land. The motte was surrounded by a timber palisade around a wooden keep and formed part of a defensive line with similar mottes at Thornhill and Whitchurch. The early settlement that became Radyr developed around the Norman church and manor house in what is now Danescourt. Surveys in 1307 describe an agricultural hamlet surrounded by arable fields. The 14th century Welsh Lord of Radyr, Cynwrig ap Hywel, followed by his descendants, farmed the area until it was devastated by the Black Death and by battles between the Marcher Lords in 14th and 15th centuries when the whole area was laid waste.

=== Mathew family ===
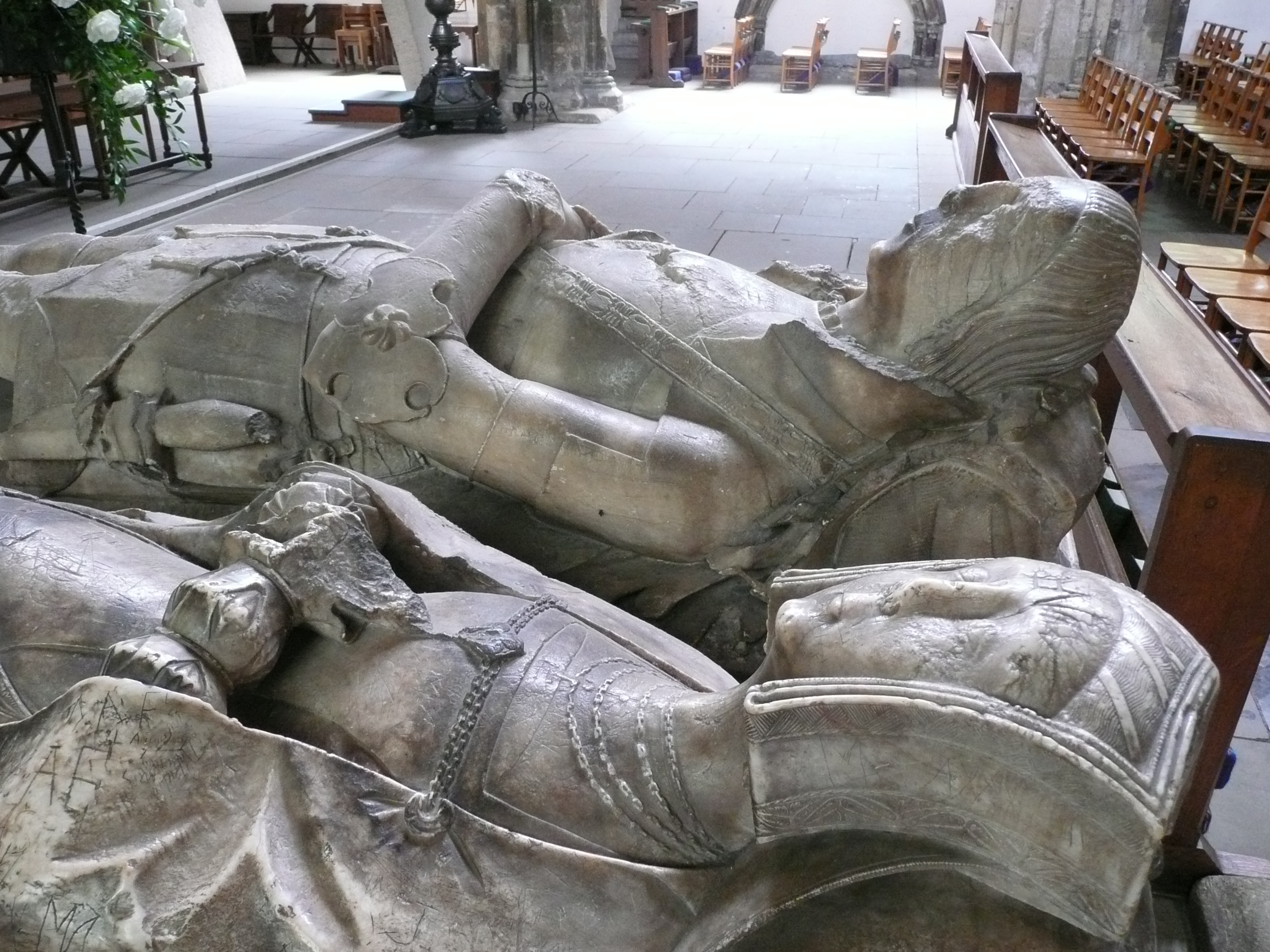
Effigies of Sir William Mathew (died 1528) and his wife. The latest of three surviving Mathew family effigies at Llandaff Cathedral

In 1469 Thomas Mathew (died 1469), the third or fourth son of Sir David Mathew (died 1484) of Llandaf, inherited the land by marriage to Catherine, heiress of Radyr, and built Radyr Court, a manor house on the site of what is now the Radyr Court Inn in Danescourt. The house was used as a court. Although it was destroyed by a fire in the 19th century, the three large dungeons survived and can still be seen at the Inn. On Thomas' death, his lands passed to his eldest son David and then to his younger son William Mathew (died 1528), who was knighted by King Henry VII at the Battle of Bosworth in 1485. Sir William accompanied Henry VIII to the Field of the Cloth of Gold in 1520. His successor was his eldest son Sir George Mathew, who became MP for Glamorganshire and in 1545 Sheriff of Glamorgan.

Sir George created a deer park that ranged far north of Radyr. Tenant farmers there were evicted, and the loss of rental income contributed to the decline in the family's fortunes. He had 24 children, eight of whom were illegitimate. Many were daughters, and Sir George needed large sums of money for their dowries. On his death Sir George's lands passed to his eldest son William, who also became an MP and invested in the Pentyrch ironworks. This was an astute move as feudalism was giving way to early industrialisation. William's descendants inherited a diminishing fortune. Captain George Mathew, the last of the family to live in Radyr, married Elizabeth Poyntz, and the couple left Radyr to live on her estates at Thurles in County Tipperary, Ireland in 1625.

=== Stuart period ===
Radyr's new owner was a wealthy landowner, Sir Edward Lewis, who was knighted by James I. Sir Edward owned St Fagans Castle and its surrounding lands, scene of the Battle of St Fagans in the English Civil War. The Lewis fortune passed to Elizabeth Lewis, who married Other Windsor, 3rd Earl of Plymouth, the principal landowner in Cardiff, Penarth and Barry.

A survey in 1766 shows that the Plymouth family owned the freeholds of most of Radyr. It continues to do so today. Plymouth Estates sold 22 acres (9 ha) of residential land in Radyr in 2007.

=== Development from the 18th century ===
Many residents of Radyr worked in the Melingriffith Tin Plate Works, on the other side of the River Taff in Whitchurch. The works opened in 1749 and closed in 1957.

Samuel Lewis' 1849 Topographical Dictionary of Wales says of Radyr:

"A parish, in the poorlaw union of Cardiff, hundred of Kibbor, county of Glamorgan, in South Wales, 3½ miles (N. W. by W.) from Cardiff; containing 279 inhabitants. This parish probably derives its name, signifying "a cataract," from the rushing waters of the river Tâf, by which it is bounded on the north-east. It was formerly comprehended within the hundred of Miskin, but has been recently separated therefrom. It comprises about eleven hundred acres of arable and pasture land, inclosed and in a profitable state of cultivation: the surface is in some parts elevated, and in others flat, but nowhere subject to inundation; the soil is a strong brown earth, favourable to the production of good crops of grain of all kinds, potatoes, and hay. The substratum is partly a hard brown stone, and partly limestone of very good quality. Radyr Court, formerly the seat of the family of Matthew, ancestors of the late Lord Llandaf, has been partially taken down, and the remainder has been modernised, and converted into a farmhouse. The turnpike-road leading from Cardiff to Llantrissent passes a little to the south of the parish; and the Tâf-Vale railway runs through it, nearly parallel with the river, which is crossed by the line in this vicinity. Some of the inhabitants are employed at the iron-works in the parish of Pentyrch.

The living is a vicarage, endowed with £200 royal bounty; patron and impropriator, the representative of the late Earl of Plymouth, who is lord of the manor: the tithes have been commuted for £113. 9s. 0d, of which a sum of £38. 9s. 0d is payable to the impropriator, and a sum of £75 to the vicar. The church, dedicated to St. John the Baptist, is a neat plain edifice, with a curious turret at the west end. There is a place of worship for Calvinistic Methodists; a Sunday school for gratuitous instruction is held in it, and another at Radyr Court. In the parish is a spring of very cold water, called Y Pistyll Goleu, "the bright water-spout," issuing from the side of a hill, under a considerable depth of earth over a limestone rock: it has by some writers been termed mineral, but it is not known to possess any other properties than that of its extreme coldness, which renders it efficacious in curing sprains and weakness of the sinews."

Until the mid 19th century Radyr was a collection of small farms, crofts and cottages, but after Radyr railway station opened in 1863, the population rose from 400 to more than 600 in 20 years. The Taff Vale Railway and its successor, the Great Western Railway, brought significant employment to Radyr. Junction Terrace (the first street in Radyr) was built to house the railway workers. It was the start of strong demand for housing in Radyr that transformed the hamlet. The Barry Railway's Walnut Tree Viaduct, built in 1901, dominated the village for some 70 years.

=== Wartime ===
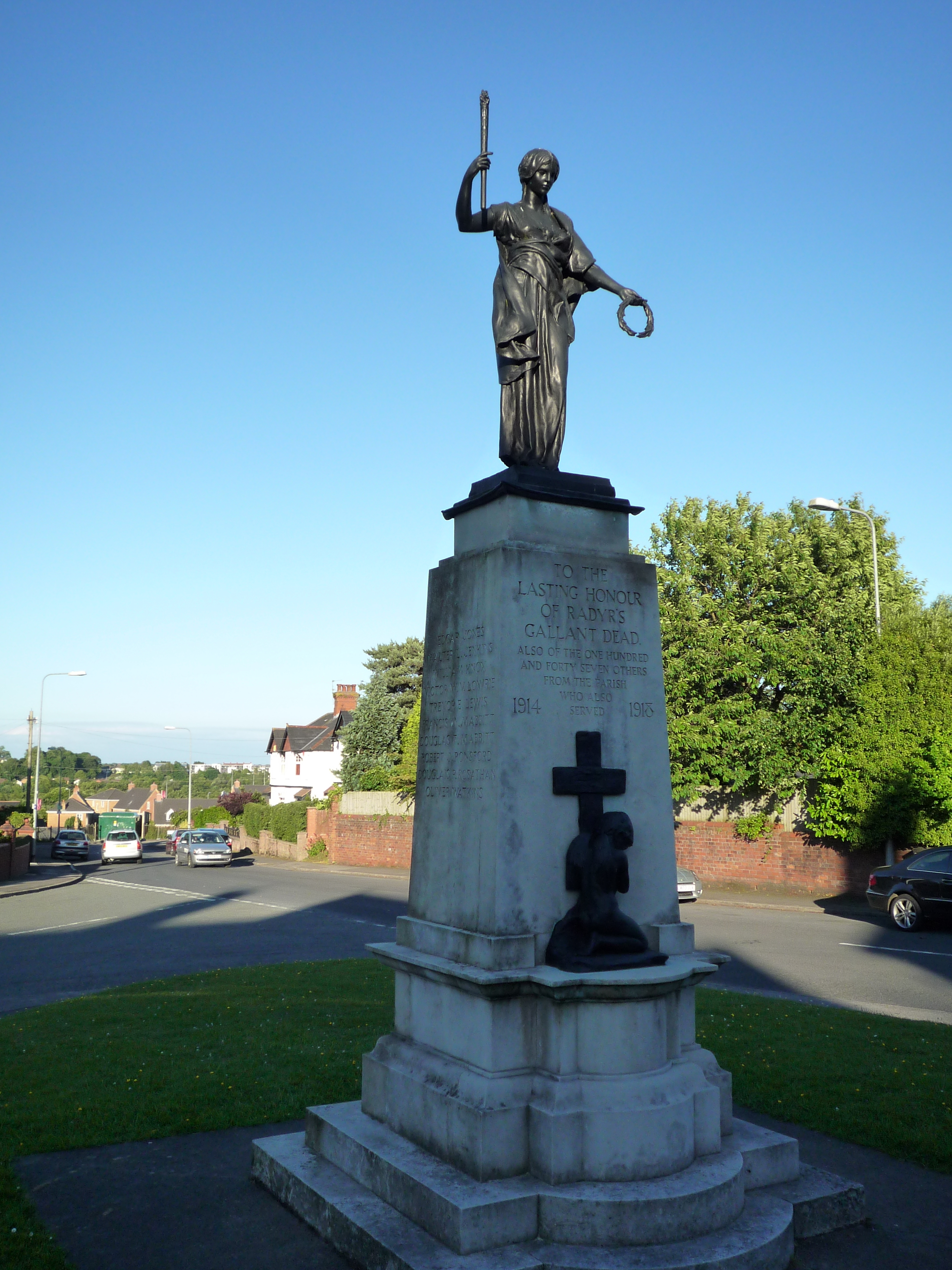
Radyr War memorial

In the First World War the community raised funds for a "Radyr bed" at the nearby Welsh Metropolitan Military Hospital in Whitchurch and established a "Citizen Guard" made up of those too old or too young to enlist. Losses suffered by the village are recorded on the War Memorial in Heol Isaf.

In the Second World War thousands of children were evacuated from metropolitan areas such as London, Birmingham and Liverpool. One evacuee from Woolwich, Patricia Armstrong aged nine, was knocked down by a passenger train and killed on a Saturday afternoon in May 1943 while using the Gelynis foot crossing at Morganstown. She was lodged with a family in Morganstown. As air raids on Cardiff increased, even younger children from Radyr were evacuated to boarding schools at Rhoose and Bridgend.

=== Post-war history ===
An extensive housebuilding programme started in the 1960s, and Radyr's population grew rapidly — particularly children. In 1964 Radyr Primary School had 135 pupils on its roll. This number more than trebled in the next decade. A new development, the Danescourt estate, was built on land surrounding Radyr Court and St John the Baptist parish church, and the land was officially incorporated as a suburb of Cardiff in 1974. Danybryn Woods, near the development, was retained as the entire forest is protected by a tree preservation order and is home to many species of plants and wildlife. Radyr railway station was renovated in 1998 and the tracks through the station were renewed, reducing journey times to Cardiff city centre.

In 2017 construction started on the first phase of a new Cardiff suburb of 7,000 houses, named Plasdwr, on countryside along the Llantrisant Road between Radyr and St Fagans.

== Governance ==
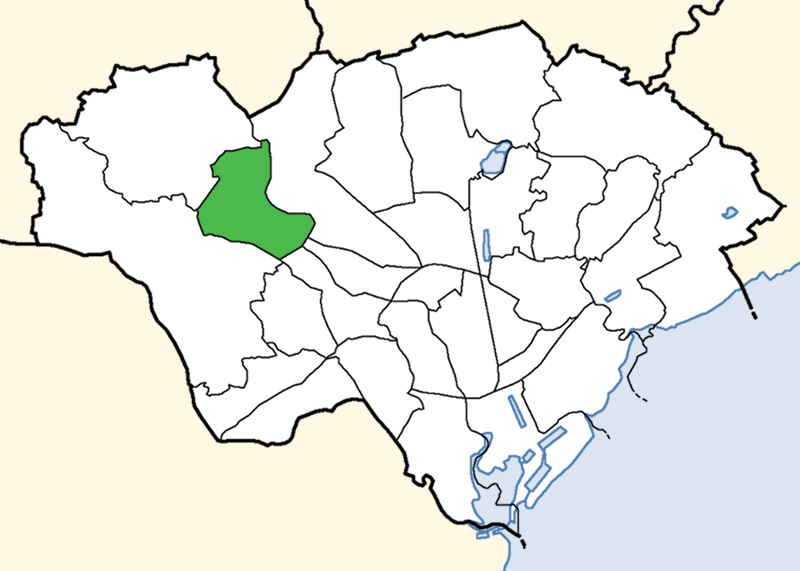
Radyr and Morganstown electoral ward in Cardiff

=== UK Parliament and Senedd ===
Radyr is in the Cardiff West parliamentary constituency and the Cardiff West Senedd constituency.

=== Cardiff Council ===
Radyr electoral ward (often known as Radyr and Morganstown) has one seat on Cardiff Council and had an electorate of 4,368 (1 May 2008). The ward elected a Conservative, Roderick McKerlich, in the election of May 2008 and he was re-elected in 2012 and 2017. Cllr McKerlich is a member of the Council's Environmental Scrutiny Committee.

=== Community Council ===
Radyr and Morganstown Community Council is funded by an addition to the Council Tax bill paid by local residents. The Community Council is run by 11 elected councillors from three wards in the parish – Radyr North (4 seats), Radyr South (3 seats) and Morganstown (4 seats) - subsequently increased to 12 councillors (4:4:4).

== Geography ==
=== Geological structure ===
The surrounding soils are mostly a strong, brown, dry earth, well adapted for arable farming and the growing of grains of all kinds that contributed to the area being a mostly farming community until the modern era. Soils were further enriched over the millennia by alluvial deposits from the River Taff. The bedrock under the whole area is predominantly sandstone, dating from both the Devonian period (Old Red Sandstone) and the Triassic (New Red Sandstone) laid down in arid conditions. These may subsequently have been ground down by the Taff valley glacier during the last ice age around 18,000 years ago. Radyr Stone is a Triassic breccia used widely for decorative work in the Cardiff area, including Llandaff Cathedral, Cardiff Docks and in the bridges of the Taff Vale Railway.

=== Radyr Weir ===
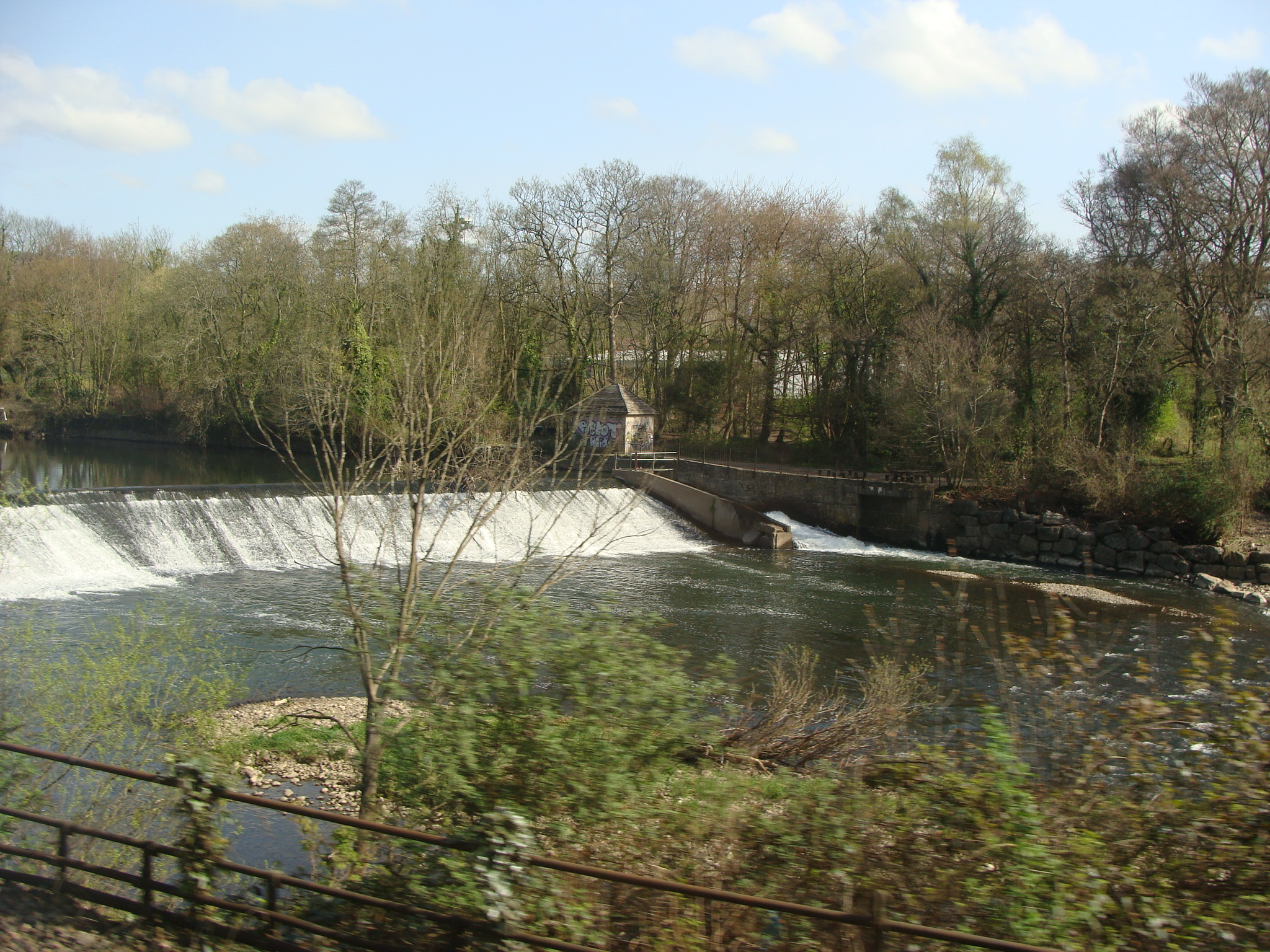
Radyr Weir

The River Taff at this point runs roughly south through Taff's Well, past Radyr and through Llandaff.

Radyr Weir was built in 1774 to divert water into a leat to the Melingriffith Tin Plate Works. The weir is the third obstacle to migratory salmon and sea trout — the others being Llandaff Weir and Blackweir, both of which also have fish passes. Since the early 1980s, the salmon and sea trout stocks in the Taff have been recovering from nearly 200 years of industrial pollution and exploitation. In 1993 the National Rivers Authority monitored over 500 salmon and 700 sea trout returning to the river to spawn.

From 1749, iron from Pentyrch was initially transported to the works using pack-horses, then tub boats were used on the Taff passing onto the feeder via a lock at Radyr Weir. Parts of this lock can still be seen beside the feeder sluice. In 1815 the tub boats were discontinued and a tramway built along the Taff. There is a public picnic site by the Radyr weir.

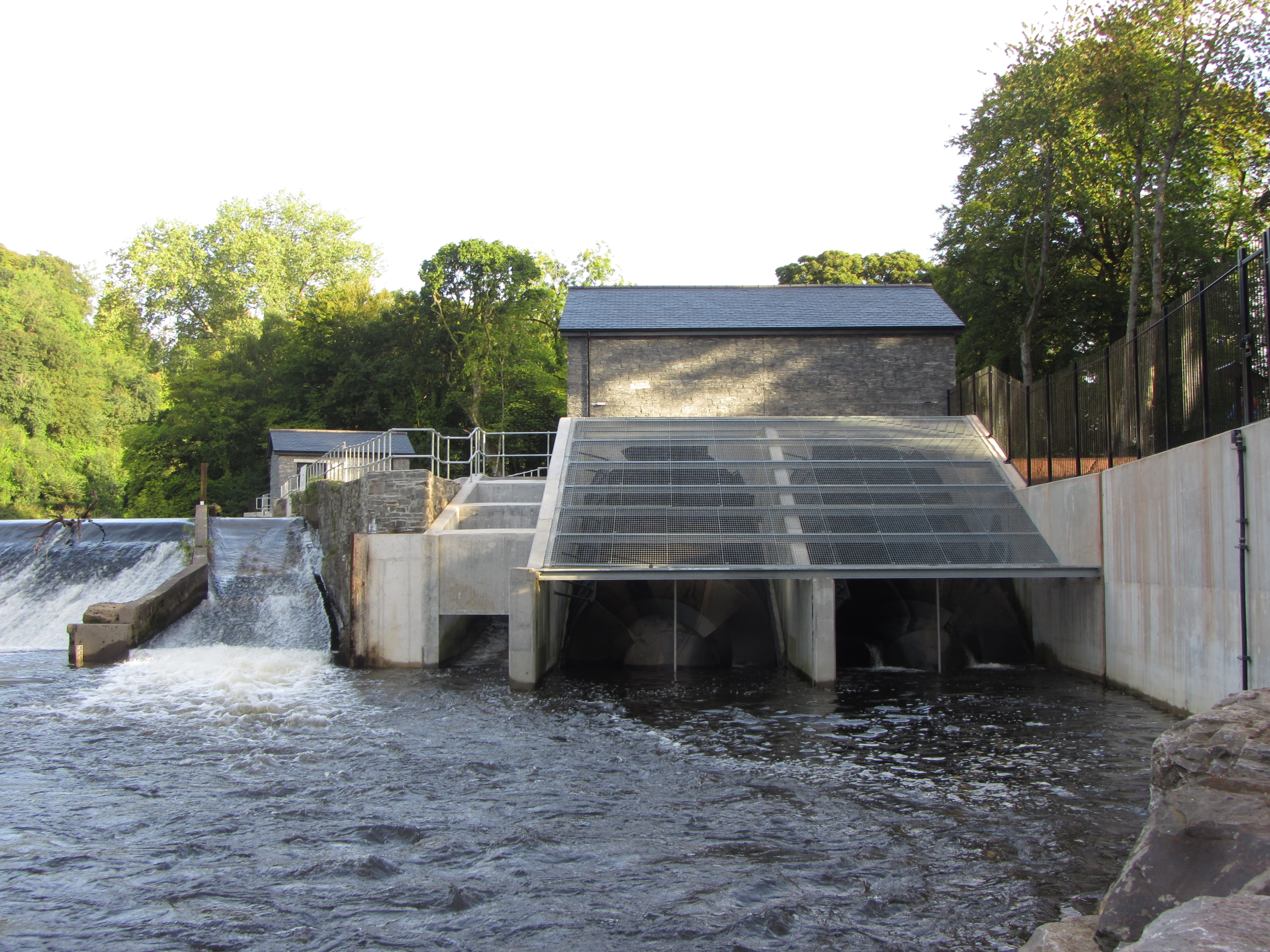
Screw turbines

A hydro-electric scheme was built in 2016 on Radyr Weir to generate renewable energy. The Radyr Weir scheme channels more than 500 million cubic metres of water per year through two screw turbines and is expected to generate 400 kW — enough energy to power three of the city’s leisure centres — which will save 700 tonnes of CO_{2} annually.

The River Taff through Radyr is flanked on both sides by an undeveloped greenway that passes uninterrupted through northern Cardiff all the way to Cardiff Castle in the centre of the city, before the river enters Cardiff Bay.

=== Radyr Woods Nature Area ===
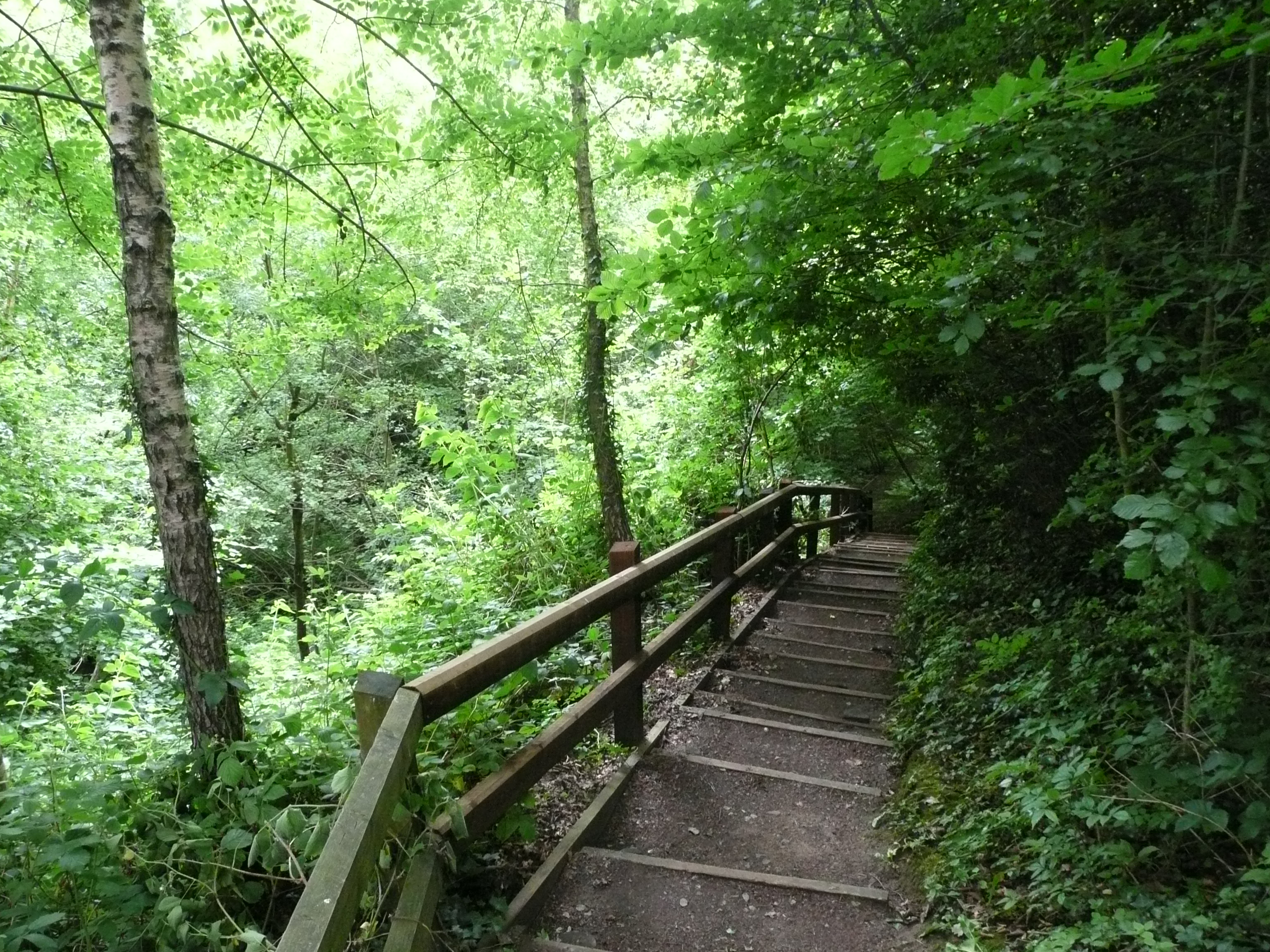
Radyr Woods boardwalk

Radyr Woods is a Site of Importance for Nature Conservation (SINC), under the name Radyr Community Woodlands, covering 15.6 acres (6 ha), and the adjoining Hermit Woods is the smallest Local Nature Reserve (LNR) in Wales, at 1.47 acres (1 ha)). The Community Woodlands have a network of footpaths and boardwalks and includes evidence of Iron Age settlements and remains of an early cooking hearth. Originally part of the Tudor deer park owned by the Mathew family and later Radyr Quarry, the area is owned by Cardiff Council and Plymouth Estates, and managed by the Radyr community council with the support of Cardiff Council's Parks Service.

Radyr Woods provides habitats for a wide range of species. It also has a number of natural springs that feed a duck pond and a kingfisher pond. Recent housing developments between the reserve and the railway line have added complementary public open space with picnic areas and a children's play area. Since 1986 all maintenance and development of the reserve has been carried out by a volunteer group known as The Friends of Radyr Woods.

=== Radyr hawkweed ===
Radyr hawkweed is the common name of Hieracium radyrense, a very rare endemic member of the aster, daisy, or sunflower family. It is a microspecies, so far only identified at Radyr. It was first identified in 1907 at the quarry, was described as a variety in 1948 and then as a separate species in 1955. It has rarely been seen and regular surveys between 1998 and 2004 indicate that today only a single population of about 25 plants survives in the wild.

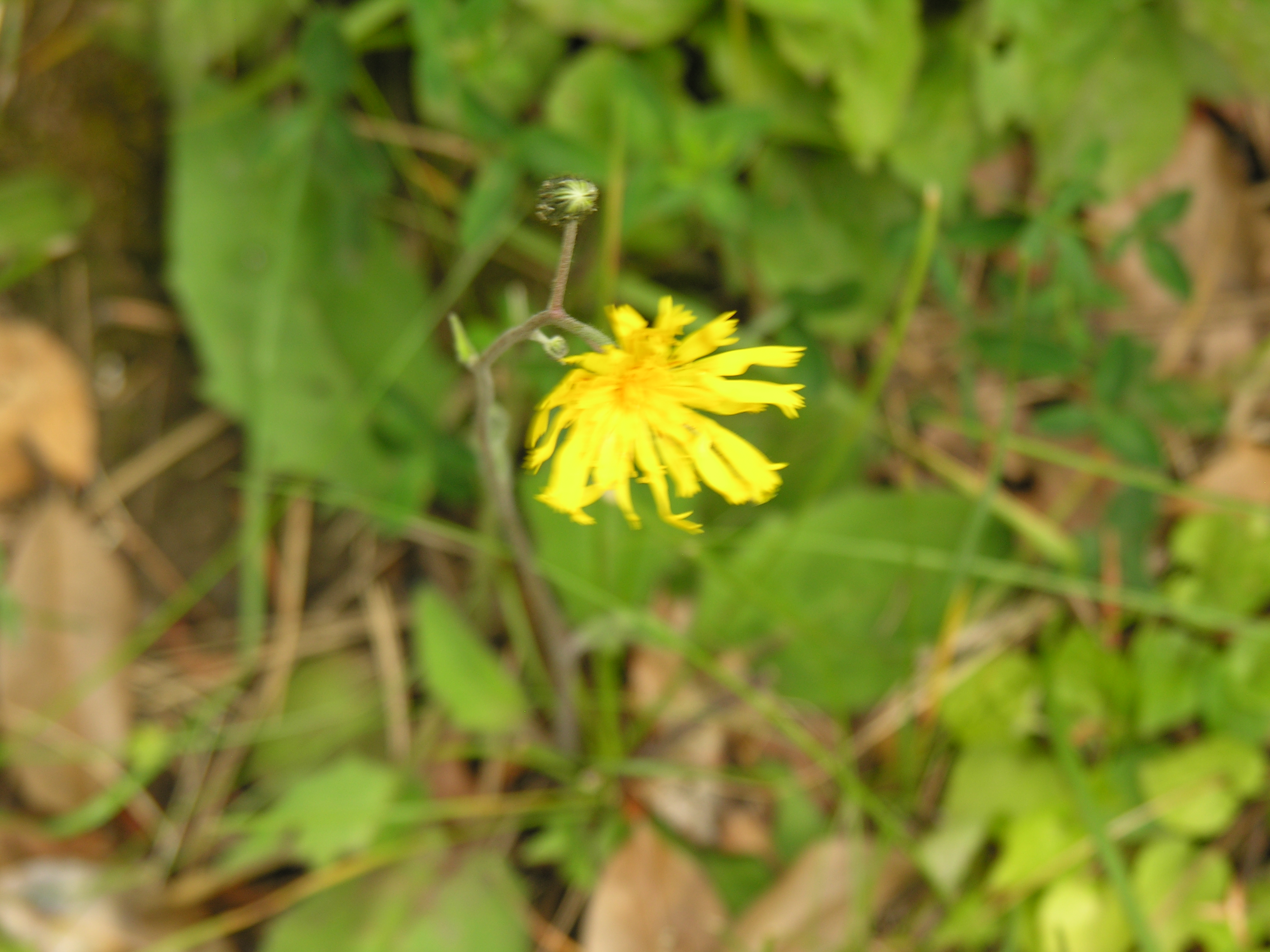
Radyr hawkweed

In the first survey of 1998, only nine plants were identified in one single Radyr garden, where it traditionally grew on grassy banks and lawns, often in shade. It was no longer found at the original locality of Radyr Quarry where examples were last seen in 1985. At Bridgend, six possible plants of the Radyr genus were found on an old garden wall, but confirmation of identification is still awaited.

Neither the species nor the sites have any current legal protection, and it could be under significant threat of survival in the long term from inappropriate gardening or care. Seed samples of the Radyr hawkweed have been provided to the Millennium Seed Bank, the international conservation project coordinated by the Royal Botanic Gardens, Kew, and plants are being carefully cultivated. The plant normally flowers between May and early July and Radyr residents are urged by botanists to be on the look out for further examples of the endangered species while walking in the area.

== Demography ==
Year	Population of Radyr	Change
1801	196	–
1811	106	-46%
1821	128	21%
1831	227	77%
1841	279	23%
1851	417	50%
1881	519	24%
1891	610	18%
1901	816	34%
1911	1,238	52%
1921	1,634	32%
1931	1,586	-3%
1951	1,568	-1%
1961	1,690	8%
2001	4,658	176%
2009	6,000	29% *
source: Vision of Britain except *, which is estimated by the Office for National Statistics. Historical populations are calculated with the modern boundaries

The 2001 census showed that the suburb had a total population of 4,658, of whom 2,268 were male and 2,390 were female. The average age was 39.7 years. 68.27% of [adult] residents are married, with 20.81% having never married. 73.97% declared their religion as Christianity. 23.97% stated no religion and 0.9% stated Muslim. 96.02% stated their ethnicity as white, 1.76% as Asian, 1.03% as mixed race, 1.01% as Chinese, and 0.2% as Black. 15.5% are Welsh language speakers.

== Landmark buildings and local attractions ==
Danybryn Cheshire Home was once a private house owned by Sir Lewis Lougher MP. It later had two wings added to accommodate the residents, who are physically disabled young people. The Thatch, the only thatched cottage in Radyr, was built for the Mathias family in 1936. St John the Baptist parish church is nearly 800 years old, but underwent a Victorian restoration in the 19th century.

The Taff Trail cycle path passes through Radyr via Radyr Weir. Other notable buildings include The Old Church Rooms and Radyr War Memorial. Gelynis Farmhouse is a Grade II* listed building. In nearby districts are St Fagans National History Museum (formerly the Museum of Welsh Life) and Castell Coch.

== Education ==
The Church Rooms in Park Road were also a primary school until 1896 when the Board School was opened next door. Older pupils had to travel to secondary schools in Penarth by train. The part-time Radyr Library serves the area.

=== Nursery and primary schools ===
Bryn Deri Primary School was opened in 1976 and has included a nursery school since September 1999. Radyr has also a private pre-school, Park Road Nursery, and a Welsh-language nursery called Cylch Meithrin, both of which are based in the Old Church Rooms.

Radyr Primary School in Park Road opened in 1896, and new classrooms were added in 1968 to accommodate the rising population. The school currently has 11 classes and over 300 pupils.

=== Secondary education ===
Radyr Comprehensive School has more than 1,400 pupils from across west Cardiff. It also has a large Sixth Form college with about 300 students, and an active adult education centre. In March 2021, Radyr Comprehensive School was the scene of a major incident where "malicious communication" was phoned through to the school. Armed police attended the scene and all pupils were successfully evacuated from the school.

== Churches ==
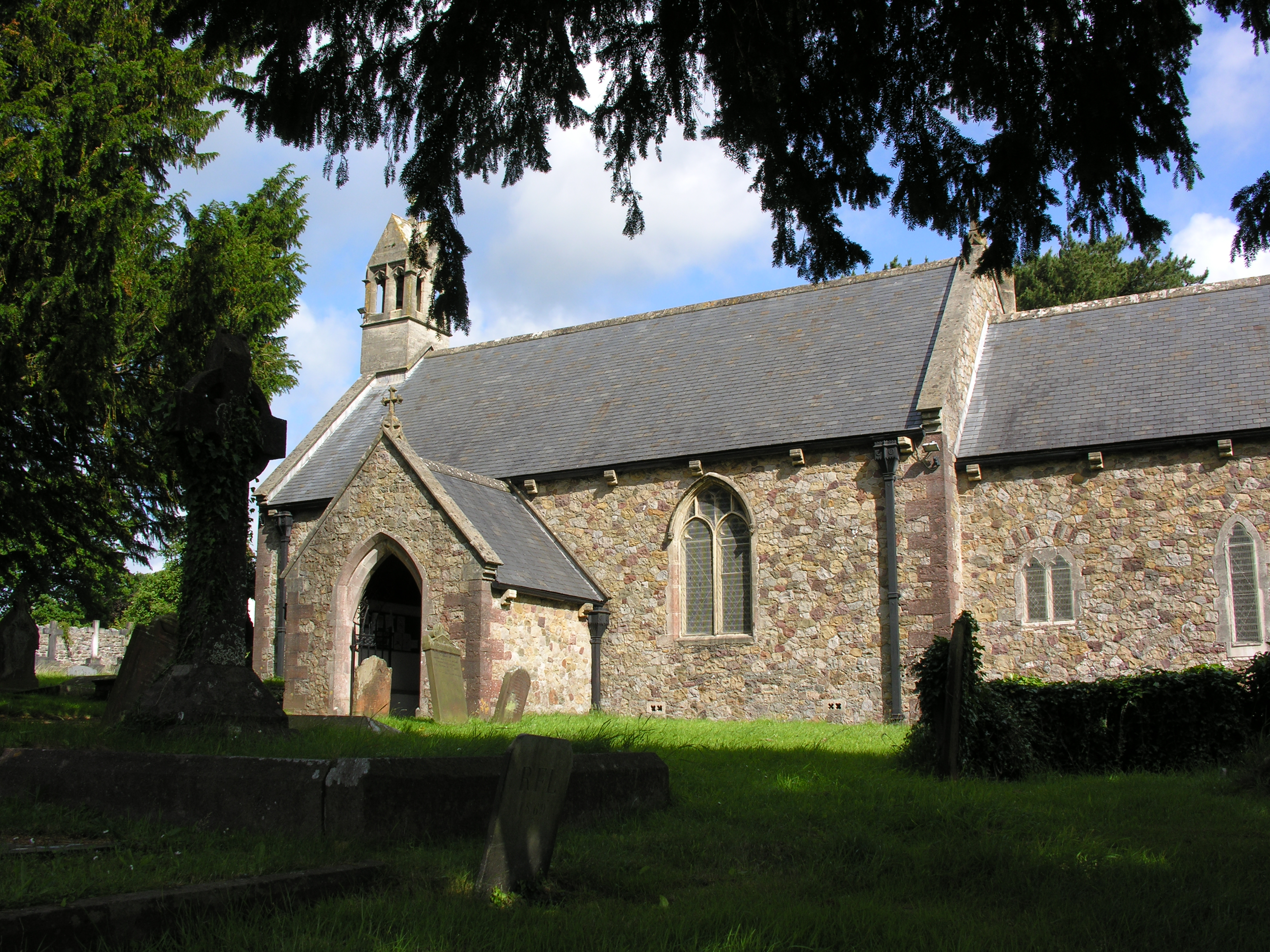
St John the Baptist parish church

The Church in Wales Parish of Radyr is in the Diocese of Llandaff. The parish church of St John the Baptist, beside Radyr Chain, is now surrounded by the Danescourt housing estate. It is nearly 800 years old but was altered in the 19th century. It is a Grade II listed building.

Christ Church, although a larger building than St John's, is the daughter church in Radyr. Designed by the Llandaff diocesan surveyor George Halliday, the nave was ready for use at Easter 1904 and the chancel and tower were completed in November 1910. Also in 1910 John Taylor & Co of Loughborough cast a ring of eight bells for the tower. Lieutenant Colonel Fisher paid for the bells, and each bell is inscribed with the names of members of his family.

Radyr Methodist Church in Windsor Road replaced an earlier Methodist Church in Heol Isaf. Radyr is also served by Radyr Baptist Church, which worships in the Old Church Rooms in Park Road.

== Sport and leisure ==
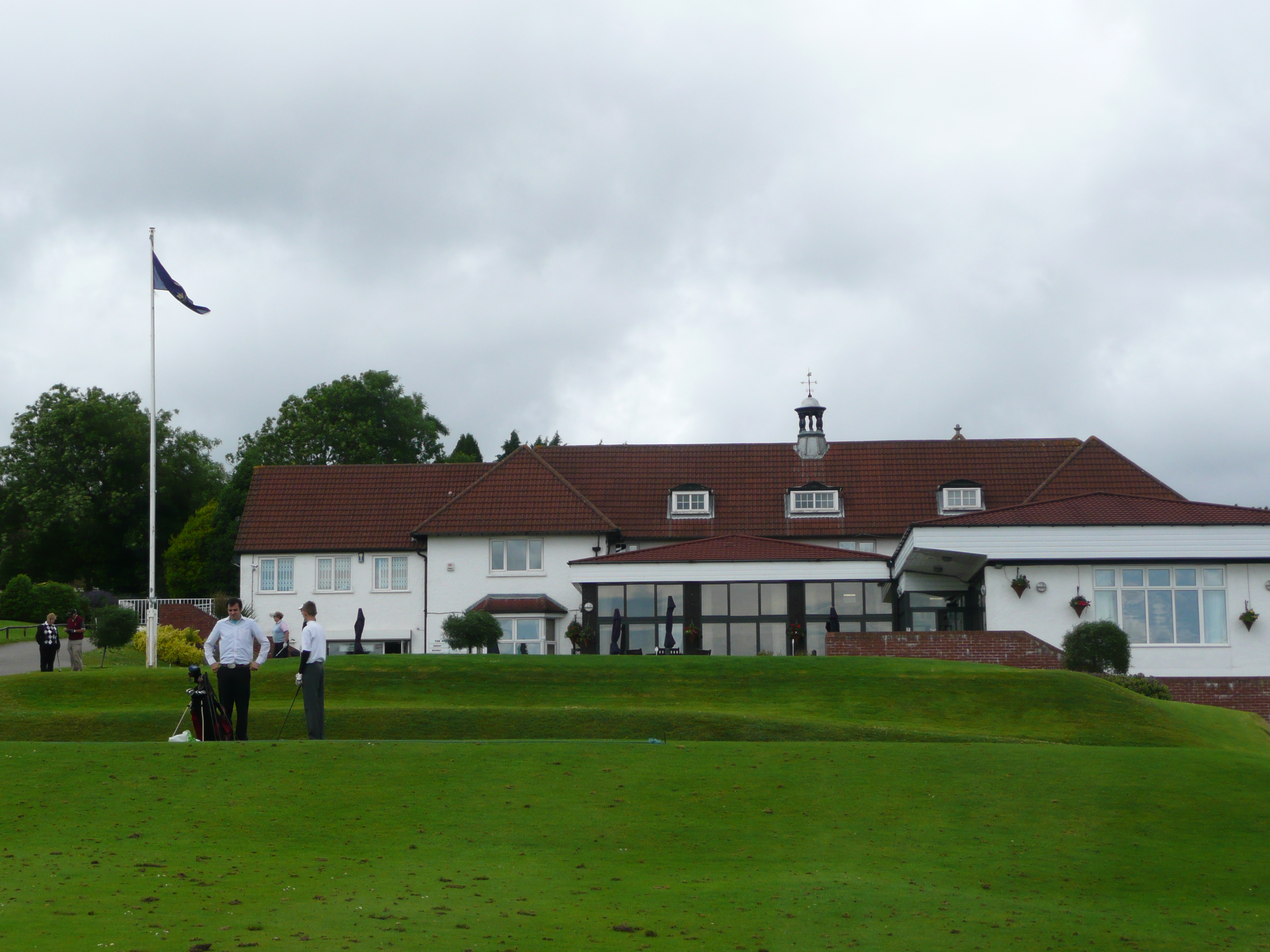
Radyr Golf Club clubhouse

Llandaff North RFC is the closest rugby team to Radyr. Nearby Taffs Well RFC was formed in 1887, and has provided three former Welsh Rugby captains and six Welsh International players during its history.

Radyr Golf Club was founded in 1902 after moving from its original nine-hole course at the Tŷ Mawr in Lisvane. It is a 6,109 yards (5,586 m), par 70 (SSS 70) course for men and 5,510 yards (5,040 m), par 73 (SSS 73) for women, and operates all year round. Laid out by the course designer Harry Colt, the Chairman of the 2010 Ryder Cup recently described Radyr's course as "One of Colt's Little Jewels".

Radyr Lawn Tennis Club was founded in 1914 by 20 Radyr 'Gentlemen', helped by the Earl of Plymouth Estates. Its first location was near the railway station but the courts were badly laid. Again with the help of Plymouth Estates, the club lifted the turf from all three grass courts and relaid it on its current site next to Christ Church on Heol Isaf.

Radyr Cricket Club was founded in 1890 by the Earl of Plymouth, who granted a hundred-year lease for the current riverside ground to the local residents for a nominal sum. The pavilion was destroyed by fire in 1973 while the team were away on tour. Under the leadership of the new Chairman Keith Terry, a huge fund-raising effort was made and a new pavilion opened on the footprint of the old one in 1975. Radyr currently plays in the first division of the South Wales Premier Cricket League.

Cardiff Corinthians Football Club (known locally as the "Corries") has played its home games at the Riverside Football Ground in Radyr since 1974 and competes in the first division of the Welsh Football League.

The main shops in Radyr are in Station Road. One of the buildings on this road, Bryn Melyn, is now a dental surgery but was formerly the village post office.

== Transport ==
=== Rail ===
At the turn of the 20th century Radyr had a busy railway from where coal trains were transferred onto either the Taff Vale Railway to Cardiff Docks, or the Penarth district line to the docks at Penarth, 4 miles (6.4 km) southwest of Cardiff city centre. Also, the Barry Railway Company freight route ran just to the north of Morganstown, over Walnut Tree Viaduct. To the south-east of Radyr was an extensive railway marshalling yard which included another railway bridge over the Taff to provide an alternative route towards Llandaff. The sidings were lifted in preparation for a housing development in the 1970s.

Radyr railway station still handles significant traffic, with over 200 trains calling each weekday and more than 400,000 passenger journeys per year. Radyr is the northern terminus of the Cardiff City Line.

=== Bus ===
Cardiff Bus route 63 and Stagecoach South Wales route 122 operate from Morganstown and Radyr to Cardiff Central bus station via Danescourt, Llandaf and Pontcanna.

=== Road ===
The B4262 road (Heol Isaf) runs through the centre of Radyr and Morganstown, leading north to Taff's Well and the A470 towards Pontypridd, and south to the A4119 (Llantrisant Road), which links Llantrisant with Danescourt, Llandaff and Cardiff city centre.

The M4 corridor around Cardiff was announced in 1971 as a replacement for a northern link road that had been planned since 1947 but never built. The northern "Lisvane and Radyr route" for the M4 was eventually chosen after a number of noisy public enquiries and active objections by residents from both communities. The new motorway was completed and opened on 10 July 1980, and passes east–west between Radyr and Morganstown. Later this section was widened to three lanes in each direction at a cost of over £71 million, being completed in December 2009. Radyr has no direct access to or from the motorway.

== Notable people ==
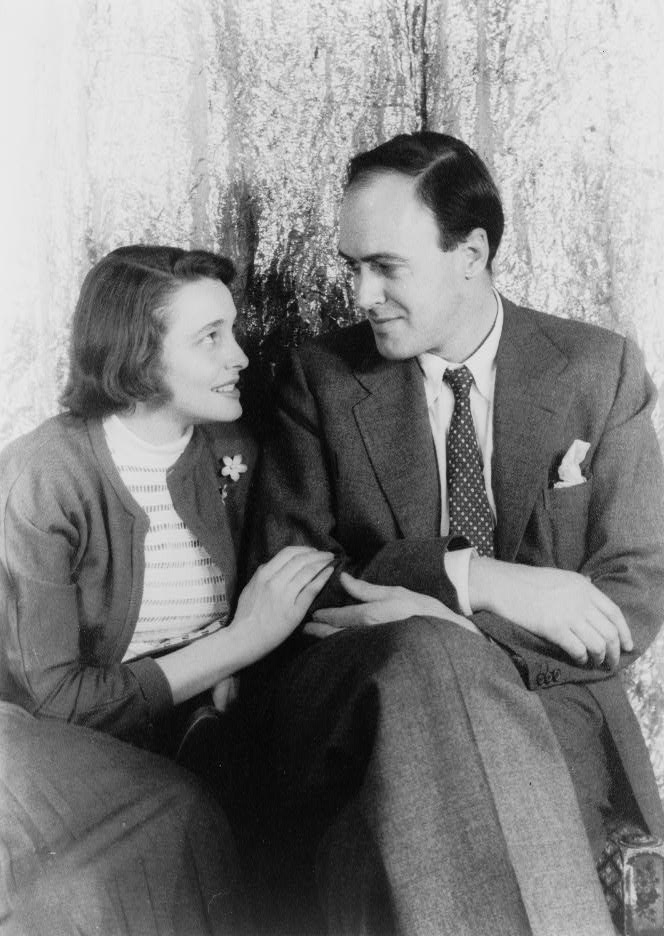
Roald Dahl with Patricia Neal

Several notable people are associated with Radyr. The children's author Roald Dahl (1916–90) lived in the 1920s at a house called Tŷ Mynydd in Radyr (which was demolished in 1967). He called it an "imposing country mansion, surrounded by acres of farm and woodland" in his book Boy: Tales of Childhood. Jimi Mistry (born 1973), who is an Asian-British actor and appeared in EastEnders, The Guru and East Is East, attended Radyr Comprehensive School. Cardiff shipowner and Conservative MP Sir Lewis Lougher (1871-1955) lived at Radyr, initially in Danybryn before moving to Northlands where he died.

Local sportsmen include Harry Corner (1874–1938), an English cricketer who played in the Great Britain team that won a gold medal at the 1900 Summer Olympics, who lived, died and was buried in Radyr. Hugh Johns (1922–2007), who was best known as a football commentator for ITV, retired and died in Radyr. Frank Meggitt (1901–45), a Welsh cricketer, a right-handed batsman and wicket-keeper who played for Glamorgan, also lived in the town after retiring from the sport. The athlete and runner Timothy Benjamin (born 1982) was born and raised in Radyr.

Another notable resident is Sir Martin Evans (born 1941), the Professor of mammalian genetics at Cardiff University who received the Albert Lasker Award for Basic Medical Research in 2001, was knighted in 2003 and was awarded the 2007 Nobel Prize for medicine for his work on stem cells. He is also a Fellow of the Royal Society and a Fellow of the Academy of Medical Sciences.

== Radyr in the media ==
The outdoor scenes in an episode of the TV science fiction series Torchwood, called Small Worlds, were filmed mostly around Radyr Primary School.
