= Plasdŵr =

Planned suburb of Cardiff, Wales

Coordinates: 51°30′17″N 3°15′28″W

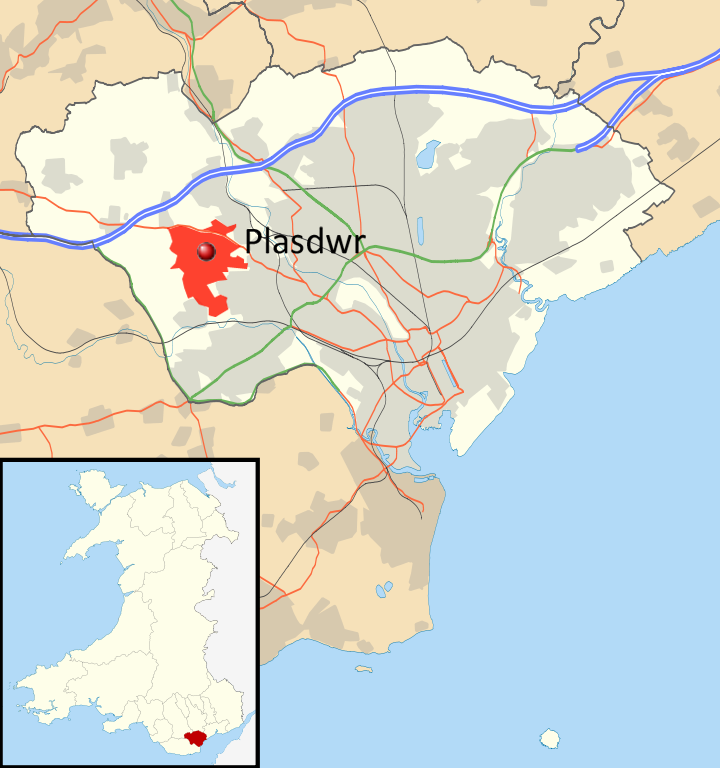
Planned location map of Plasdŵr in Cardiff

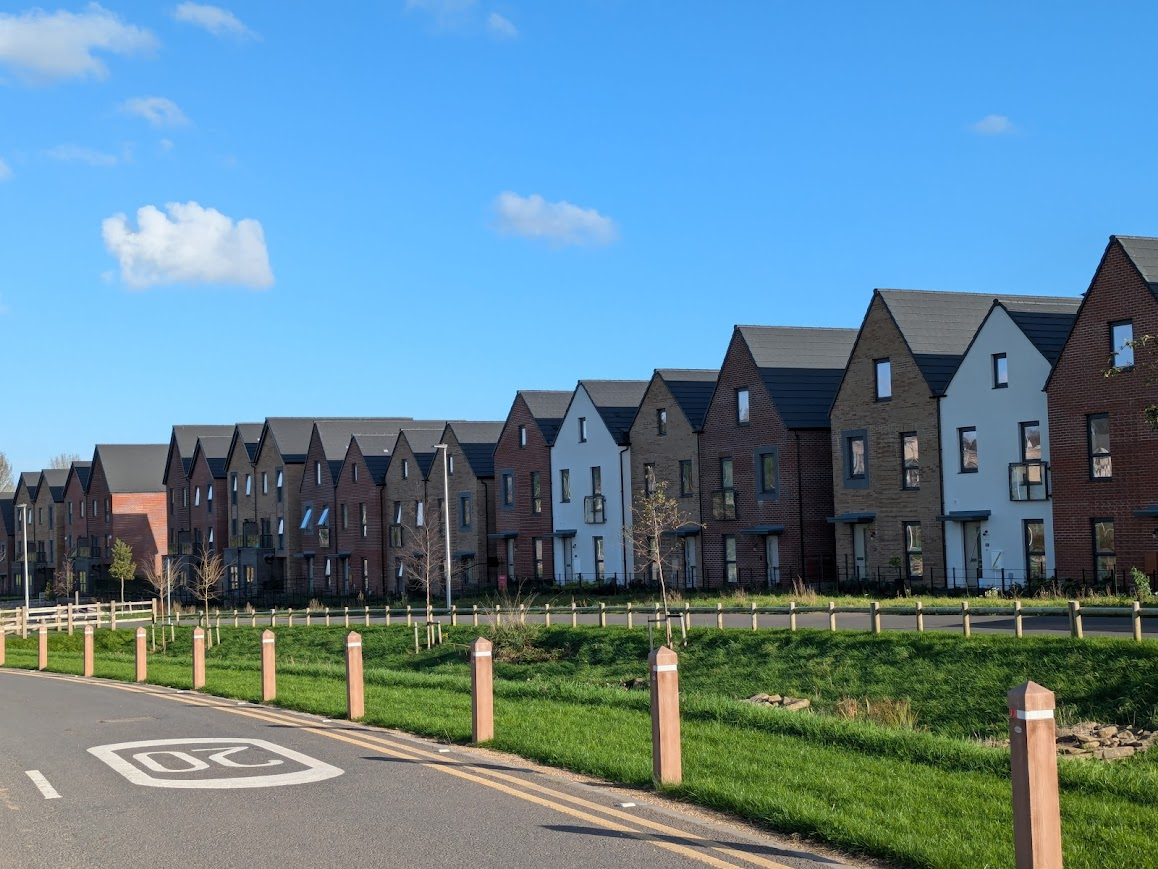
Plasdŵr in 2024

Plasdŵr (Welsh for 'waterhall'; Welsh pronunciation: [plasˈduːr]) is a planned new suburb of approximately 7,000 homes in the north of Cardiff, Wales. Construction by lead developer Redrow Homes started in 2017.

== Background ==
Plans were submitted in December 2014 for "Plasdŵr" (meaning "Waterhall" in English) which was to be created on 360 hectares (900 acres) of countryside owned by the Plymouth Estates between the village of St Fagans and existing Cardiff suburbs of Fairwater, Danescourt and Radyr. An area of what is now part of Fairwater was previously known as Waterhall (and a Waterhall Road still runs between Fairwater and Danescourt).

The plans included approximately 7,000 homes (with a first phase of 920) plus infrastructure including five schools, offices and shops and leisure facilities. The scheme is being marketed by developer Redrow Homes as a "21st century garden city". Planning approval was granted for the first 630 homes in February 2016, after Cardiff Council had approved the city's Local Development Plan (LDP) which envisaged 40,000 new homes being built across Cardiff by 2026. Planning permission was granted for the remainder of the scheme (6,000 homes including health and leisure facilities) in March 2017, the largest planning application ever considered by the local authority.

Redrow has been asked to pay £28 million towards improved transport infrastructure.

== Construction ==
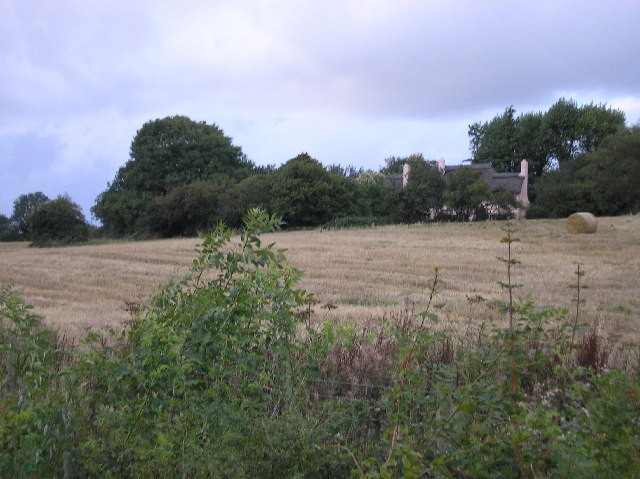
Farmland next to the Llantrisant Road near Radyr, in 2005

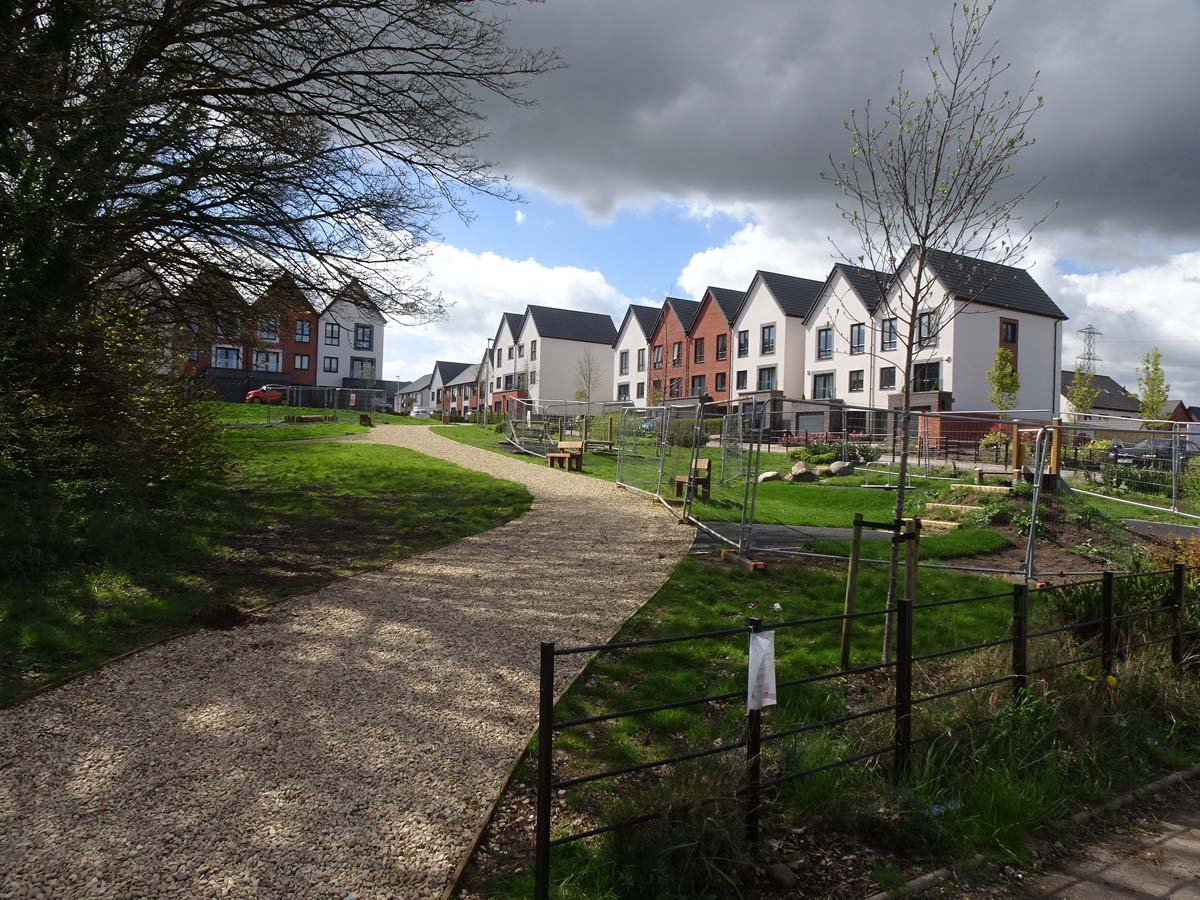
New green space and housing southwest of Llantrisant Road (2023)

Building work started on the first 126 homes on land north of Llantrisant Road at Easter 2017. In January 2018 a 6.5-hectare (16-acre) "show village" was unveiled. Thirty houses had already been sold and occupants had moved into six of them. Completion of the whole scheme is expected to take 20 years.

The last remaining farm in the area, Maes-y-llech Farm adjacent to Llantrisant Road, was subject of legal action in 2018 by the Earl of Plymouth to evict the tenant farmers from the land. They protested by painting 'sad face' emojis on their hay bales.

A new primary school was planned, with both an English language and a Welsh language entry route, though with the English stream being taught in Welsh up to 50% of the time. The proposal attracted criticism both from proponents and opponents of Welsh language medium education. The completion was delayed because of the 2020 COVID-19 pandemic. The school would have a catchment area including Plasdŵr, Creigiau, St Fagans, Radyr, Morganstown and Fairwater.
