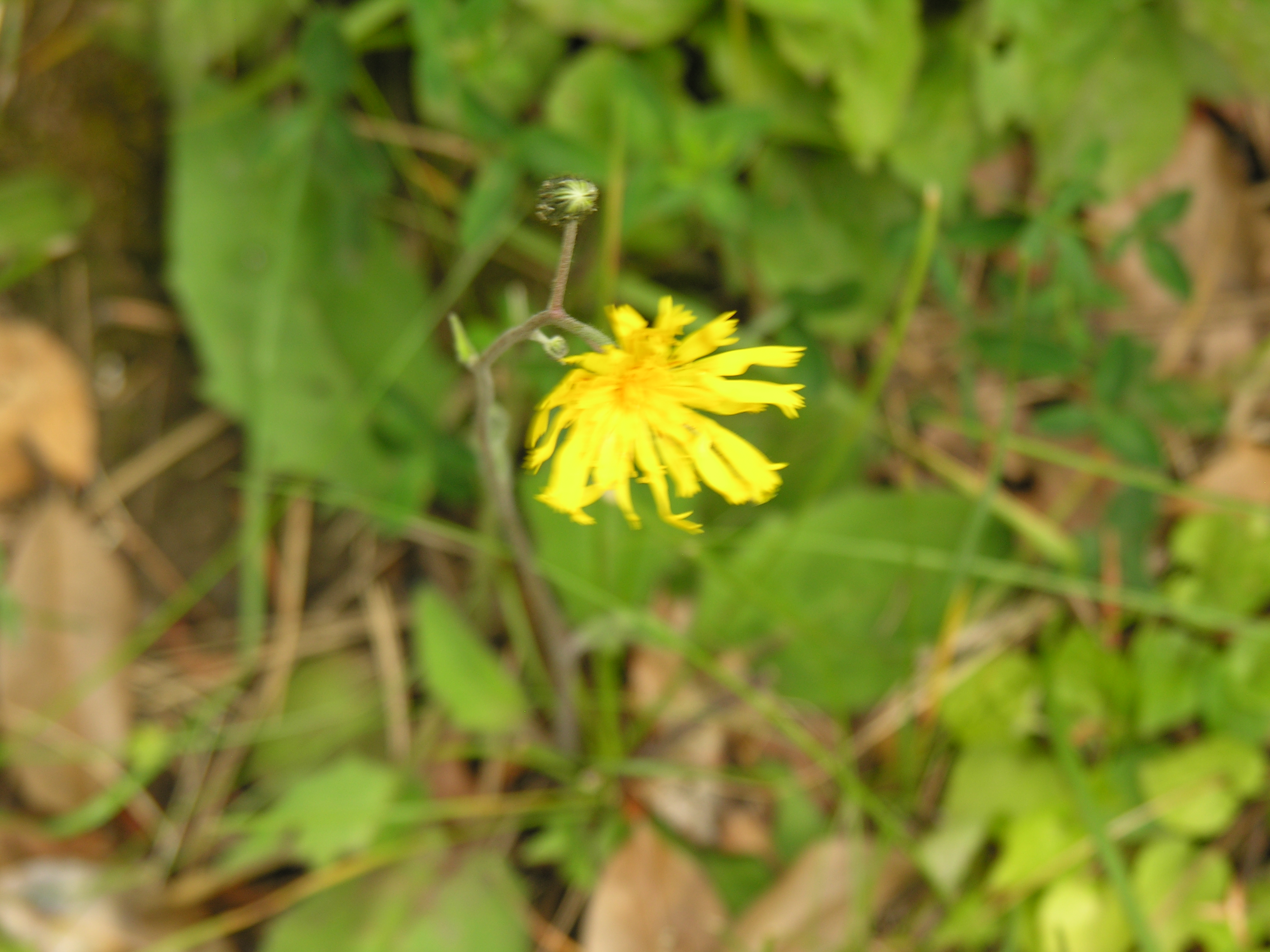

Scientific classification
- Kingdom: Plantae
- Clade: Tracheophytes
- Clade: Angiosperms
- Clade: Eudicots
- Clade: Asterids
- Order: Asterales
- Family: Asteraceae
- Genus: Hieracium
- Species: H. radyrense

Binomial name
- Hieracium radyrense (Pugsley) P.D. Sell & C. West

= Hieracium radyrense =

Species of flowering plant

Hieracium radyrense, the Radyr hawkweed, is a very rare endemic species restricted to Radyr in south Wales, UK. First identified in 1907 it was described as a variety in 1948 and a species in 1955. and belongs to Hieracium section Vulgata. It has rarely been seen and surveys between 1998 and 2004 indicate that only one population of about 25 plants survives.

A polycarpic perennial, Radyr hawkweed flowers from late May to early June or July. Specimens found at Danybryn in Radyr grew on a grassy bank and lawn under the partial shade of trees and shrubs.

== Identification ==
The main features are broadly ovate-lanceolate, acute basal rosette leaves, with diagnostic marked teeth on the rosette leaves and dense stellate hairs on the involucral bracts. With two or three acuminate stem leaves irregularly and sharply toothed, these are laciniate dentate towards the base. The ligules are hairy at the apex.
