= Walnut Tree Viaduct =

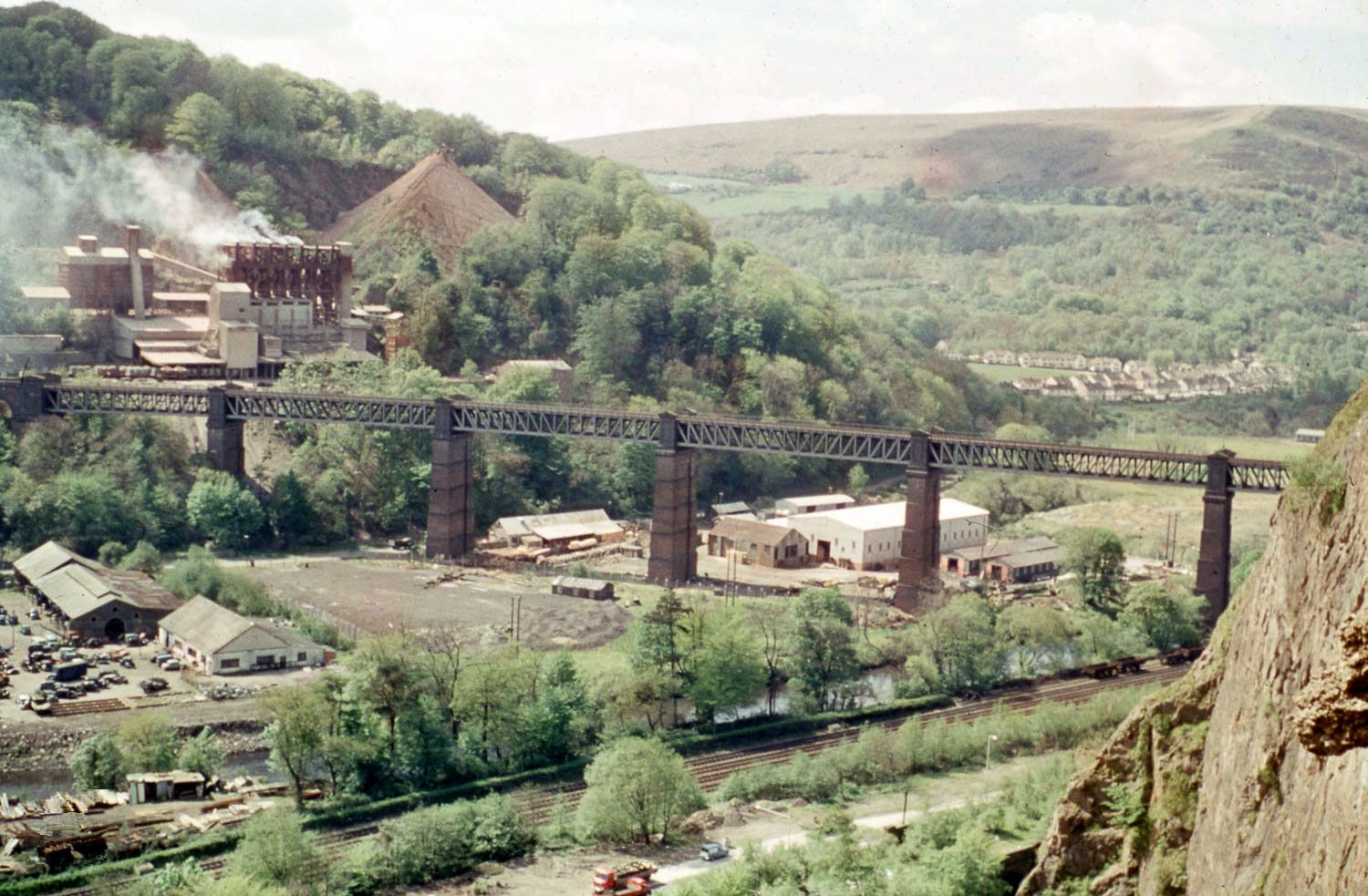
- The Walnut Tree Viaduct prior to demolition in the 1960s
- Coordinates: 51°32′14″N 3°15′42″W
- Carries: Barry Railway
- Crosses: River Taff
- Locale: Taffs Well, Cardiff, South Wales
- Owner: Barry Railway; Great Western Railway; British Railways; Cardiff Council
- Preceded by: Walnut Tree Tunnel 490 yards (450 m)
- Followed by: Penrhos Lower Junction

Characteristics
- Material: Brick columns Steel lattice girders spans
- Total length: 1,548 feet (472 m)
- Height: 120 feet (37 m)
- No. of spans: 7

History
- Architect: Sir James Szlumper
- Designer: Sir James Szlumper
- Engineering design by: Sir James Szlumper
- Construction start: 1901
- Construction end: 1901
- Closed: 1969

Walnut Tree Viaduct was a railway viaduct located above the southern edge of the village of Taffs Well, South Wales. Originally built to carry the Barry Railway across a narrow gorge through which the River Taff, Taff Vale Railway and Cardiff Railway passed, it was deconstructed in 1969, leaving only two of the support columns visible from the A470 road.

== Background ==
During the Industrial Revolution, and the mass-extraction of coal from South Wales, there was a resultant growth in construction of railways into the South Wales Coalfield. The Taff Vale Railway so monopolised the trade of shipping coal to Cardiff Docks, that mine owners were desperate for competitor railway companies to both improve speeds of shipping, provide access to new markets, and hence reduce shipping rates.

The first section of the Taff Vale Railway (TVR) to move iron from Merthyr Tydfil to Cardiff Docks opened in 1840, and included Taffs Well railway station. Following 1858, the Rhymney Railway (RR) had connected with the TVR, south of Taffs Well station at Walnut Tree Junction, a name given to the northern area of Radyr village. Almost two miles further south, Radyr station was situated, followed by Penarth Junction, later renamed Radyr Junction.

However, by 1880 the TVR and RVR were so congested with coal traffic, that a group of coal mine owners, iron makers and industrialists led by David Davies of Ocean Collieries, had all suffered from the capacity and monopoly issues created by two companies:

- Taff Vale Railway: which provided the dominant rail infrastructure. Capacity issues were particularly dominant after Pontypridd railway station, where down loaded trains and up return empty wagons were restricted to a single double track route, which could not be expanded due to the geographic challenges of the valley.
- Cardiff Docks: which having been developed by Lord Bute, were sufficient to serve his coal-exporting needs, but did not have sufficient capacity to cope with new mine developments.

In light of the geographic restrictions of the valley south of Pontypridd, Davies proposed development of a secondary route which terminated at Barry, where a dock infrastructure could be developed without the mud flat or tidal restrictions which gave Cardiff's Tiger Bay its name. This would create a competitive edge to the development, and due to being later developed to a more easily accessible docks, a resultant efficiency advantage over Cardiff.

The Barry Dock and Railway Bill was introduced in the 1883 Parliamentary session but was defeated by opposition, particularly from the Bute Docks and Taff Vale Railway. The Bill was introduced again the following year and the Barry Dock and Railway Company Act was passed on 14 August 1884 for the construction of a dock between Barry and Barry Island. The name was changed to the Barry Railway Company by an Act of 5 August 1891.

== Llanbradach branch ==
By 1889 the main line of the BRC connected Barry Docks to Hafod Junction, on the Taff Vale line, south-east of Trehafod railway station, within the Rhondda Valley. However, Davis also wanted access to the Rhymney Valley and the industrial hub of Dowlais at Merthyr Tydfil, so proposed a direct branch line to Llanbradach from Tynycaeau Junction on the Cadoxton-Trehafod main line.

Having already engineered the main line of the BRC, Chief Engineer Sir James Szlumper proposed that the new Llanbradach branch run from the BRC main line at Tynycaeau Junction near St Fagans, direct to the a junction with the Brecon and Merthyr Railway (BMR) at Llanbradach first known as Barry Junction (BMR) and later, Duffryn Isaf Junction. There would be no stations, allowing the freight trains to run unimpeded at full speed, but taking into account gradients and stopping for pinning down wagon brakes as necessary but hence maximising traffic revenue.

After passing through the Lesser Garth hill via the Walnut Tree Tunnel (490 yards (450 m)), a siding served Dolomite Quarry, before the line curved right to reach the viaduct which bridged the River Taff valley via the congested geographical squeeze-point just north of Radyr, known as Walnut Tree. The height and form of the viaduct at this point not only needed to cope with the congested valley bottom, crossing the River Taff, but also at its north-eastern end, curve onto a shelf of rock on the eastern hillside followed by a deep cutting for ¼ mile. The railway then climbed the eastern hillside to finally route north-east to reach the Rhymney Railway via Penrhos Lower Junction, allowing access to Caerphilly.

The BRC Llanbradach extension continued along the eastern side of the Taff valley, to then span the RR and the TVR via the Penrhos Viaduct, and then the Penyrheol Viaduct. Finally the line circumvented the west side of the town of Caerphilly, and crossed the Rhymney valley north of Energlyn by means of the Llanbradach Viaduct, near Pwll-y-pant, constructed to ease the gradient onto the BMR junction south of Maesycwmmer. The section from Penrhos lower Junction to the Brecon & Merthyr Junction was known as the B&M Extension.

The line from Tynycaeau Junction to Penrhos Junction was officially named the Penrhos Branch by the GWR and Successor BR Western Region and given the Engineer's Line reference PRS. The former Barry Railway's Cadoxton-Trehafod main line was given the ELR, CTD. These abbreviations still hold for remaining structures and land remaining from BR days and now in the care of the Historic Railways Estate/Highways England.

== Construction ==
Facing similar problems to those that Chief Engineer Charles Liddell with the Taff Vale Extension of the Newport, Abergavenny and Hereford Railway (NA&HR) had at the Crumlin Viaduct in spanning the Ebbw River, Szlumper surveyed the earlier structure and came to the same conclusions:

- That the necessary height, created both a structural problem and a wind problem, as the valley funnelled and hence increased wind speed.
- That a lack of suitable local resources meant that shipping in materials was the only option.
- That a stone structure would result in an unstable and high-maintenance bridge, the thick structure of which would create additional compressed wind flow around the rail tracks, resulting in a possible safety hazard for passengers and train crew.

His recommendation therefore like Liddell to the board of the BRC was for steel lattice girders spans, set atop brick-built supporting columns. The final structure, which took less than 12 months to build, opened in 1901. At its maximum 120 feet (37 m) high, the seven spans created a structure of 1,548 feet (472 m) long, which curved slightly at its western end to enable the line to bend onto the rock shelf.

== Closure and demolition ==
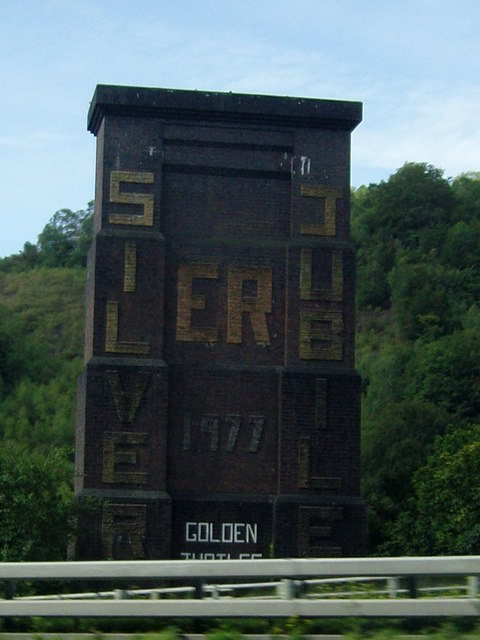
Residual brick support of the Walnut Tree Viaduct, decorated in honour of the Queen's Silver Jubilee, 1977

The Llanbradach branch (or B&M Extension) enjoyed a short but productive life north of Penrhos Lower Junction as it was de-commissioned by the later owning Great Western Railway in the early 1930s, with all three viaducts on that section removed and sold for scrap by the end of 1937. Today, all that remains is a single brick arch towards the western end of where the Llanbradach Viaduct was sited. A short section of track bed remains near Energlyn, while the rest of the trackbed was incorporated into the A468 road Caerphilly bypass.

Later renamed the 'Penrhos Branch' by the GWR, post-nationalisation it came under the control of British Railways. On 31 March 1963, a fire destroyed Tynycaeau Junction signal box and BR decided not to rebuild it, and hence the Penrhos Branch section from the Walnut Tree tunnel southwards to Tynycaeau Junction was maintained as its original double track but given 'long siding' status and as Steetley Dolomite workings had always necessitated a run-round by the steam locomotive, which could not be performed at the Walnut Tree West rail connection due to the permanent way layout, the loco' had to travel 'light engine' for a round trip of 7¼ miles by running to Tynycaeau Junction and crossing over from down to up line near the former junction with the Cadoxton-Wenvoe-Pontypridd line. With the signal box out of action at Tynycaeau, the crossover was modified to sprung points from down to up line. Eventually even that section was curtailed and sleeper stops placed on both lines at the Walnut Tree tunnel north portal. The double track south of Walnut Tree tunnel had been lifted by August 1965. The remaining branch was later worked as a single-track long siding from Penrhos to the Steetley Dolomite limestone quarry, just south of the viaduct, the permanent way layout having been modified. The last train to the quarry ran over the viaduct in 1967. The remaining permanent way to Penrhos yard and Junction was not lifted until the decommissioning of the whole line in 1969. By the late 1990s the tunnel was gated and by the year 2000 the quarry had breached the tunnel lining, leaving a 50 yards (46 m) air gap in its structure.

After Welsh Office and Cardiff Council approved the dual carriageway improvement to the A470 road, British Railways agreed to close the remaining line, with two of the Walnut Tree Viaduct brick pillars in direct alignment of the road improvement. After dominating the southern end of Taffs Well for nearly 70 years, contractors started demolition of the Walnut Tree Viaduct in 1969. Delayed by the need to demolish all but one of the piers and one pillar by hand due to the congested valley bottom, by 1974 they had finished their work.

== Today ==
Only the Walnut Tree tunnel abutment, an angled pillar and Taff Bank pier remain, all visible from the village and the A470. The Taff Bank pier was used in 1977 for displaying a message commemorating the Silver Jubilee of Elizabeth II, with the wording still visible today. Parts of the remaining track bed are now incorporated into the Taff Trail.
