= Redrow plc =

1974–2024 British housebuilder

- Company type: Public
- Traded as: LSE: RDW; FTSE 250 component
- Industry: Housebuilding
- Founded: 1974
- Headquarters: St David's Park, Ewloe, Flintshire, Wales
- Key people: Richard Akers, (Chairman); Matthew Pratt, (Group Chief Executive)
- Revenue: ▼£2,127 million (2023)
- Operating income: ▼£399 million (2023)
- Net income: ▼£298 million (2023)
- Number of employees: 2,270 (2023)
- Website: www.redrow.co.uk

Redrow plc was one of the largest British housebuilders with a network of 12 operational divisions across the UK. It was based in Flintshire, Wales and employed 2,300 people. In October 2024, its merger with Barratt Developments was finalised and it became Barratt Redrow.

The company was established in 1974 by Steve Morgan with an initial focus on civil engineering; it was not until 1982 that the business made its entry into the housebuilding sector. Redrow expanded rapidly during the mid 1980s, both geographically and in terms of business activity; by the end of the decade, it was selling in excess of 1,000 houses per year. The firm completed multiple acquisitions in the late 1980s and early 1990s, including buying Costain Homes from the Costain Group, increasing its housing ales to 2,000 per year. During 1994, having recovered from the early 1990s recession, the company was floated on the London Stock Exchange, after which Steve Morgan opted to gradually reduce his ownership stake in the business and depart the company in 2000.

The 2000s proved to be particularly turbulent for Redrow; while record profits were recorded in 2005, as the Great Recession took hold, sales roughly halved and the company incurred losses during the latter part of the decade. During 2009, Steve Morgan opted to return to Redrow, and even endeavoured to take full ownership of the company in 2012, though this ambition was unfulfilled. In the mid-2010s, the firm achieved record profits once again and recorded its 100,000th customer on 18 October 2018. One year later, Steve Morgan retired for the second time from Redrow. During the COVID-19 pandemic in the United Kingdom of the early 2000s, the company temporarily closed most of its sites and sales dipped by up to one-third.

On 7 February 2024, Barratt Developments made an agreed offer to acquire the company for £2.5 billion, which met with shareholder approval; the Competition and Markets Authority (CMA) opened an investigation into the proposed acquisition. On 22 August 2024, Barratt officially took ownership of Redrow shares; both firms continued to operate independently until final CMA approval was granted on 7 October 2024, when the firm became Barratt Redrow plc.

== History ==
=== Early years ===
Steve Morgan had been working as a site agent for Wellington Civil Engineering when, in 1974, the parent company decided it was to be closed. Morgan offered to take over the contract, borrowed £5,000 from his father, and completed the contract at a profit. Further work was carried out for Wellington and, still aged only 21, Morgan registered his new company – Redrow. Redrow gradually expanded through small civil engineering work and, with Simon Macbryde, formed a separate building company; these were later merged to leave Macbryde with 17 percent of the enlarged company. Geographically, Redrow moved from its north Wales base into Cheshire and in the early 1980s made significant construction acquisitions in Manchester and the Wirral.

During 1982, Redrow opted to start constructing houses. By 1985, its activities in this sector had grown sufficiently to separate it out from the construction business. A small acquisition in Kent provided the base for a south-east housing operation; a Midlands-centric housing subsidiary was formed in 1986. During 1987, Redrow bought Whelmar Lancashire, one of the five housing subsidiaries then being sold by Christian Salvesen. By that point, Redrow was selling over 1,000 houses per year. Further expansion took Redrow into the south-west, south Wales and Yorkshire; however, Redrow had pulled out of the vulnerable south-east market just ahead of the 1989 property collapse. Redrow returned to the south-east in 1993 as the housing recession neared its end, buying Costain Homes from the troubled Costain Group; this took Redrow's housing sales up to 2,000 per year.

The construction business was sold on, resulting in Redrow becoming purely a development business. During 1994, the company was floated on the London Stock Exchange. Initially, Steve Morgan held 59 per cent of the company's shares; however, he opted to reduce his stake to 33 per cent in exchange for £95 million in 1997. Redrow grew steadily through the rest of the decade, reaching sales of 3,000 per year. In 2000, Steve Morgan announced his intention to leave the company, retaining only a 14 percent stake in the company; Paul Pedley, who had joined Redrow as finance director in 1995, took over as managing director.

=== 2000s ===
In 2005, Redrow recorded a record profit of £141 million, a seven per cent rise over the previous year. During 2006, Redrow saw its 50,000th customer.

As a result of the outbreak of the Great Recession, Redrow was subjected to extremely difficult trading conditions during the late 2000s, including a halving of house sales in the latter part of 2008; in early 2009, the firm made efforts to reduce its debt burden to below £255 million by the mid point of the year. In March 2009, Steve Morgan returned to Redrow as executive chairman, having increased his shareholding to just under 30 percent.

In October 2009, Redrow announced the worst fiscal results in its history, which included a 53 per cent drop in revenue and a pre-tax loss of £140.8 million.

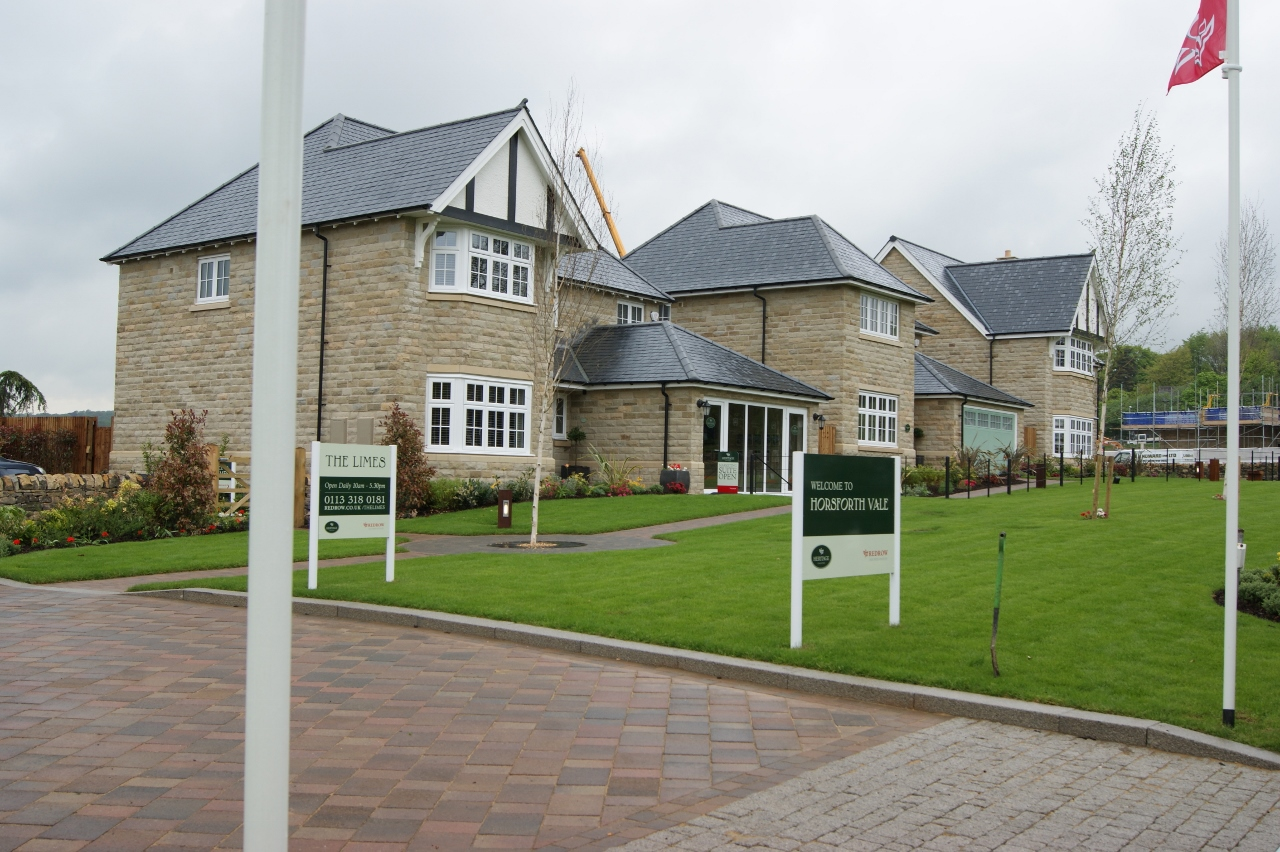
A Redrow development in Horsforth, West Yorkshire

=== 2010s ===
During 2010, Redrow launched its Heritage Collection followed by the Regent Collection and more modern Abode Collection. One year later, the company sold off its Scottish activities to Springfield Properties in exchange for £49 million.

During 2012, Steve Morgan endeavoured to take over ownership of Redrow, although no conclusive offer was ever issued. That same year, the company's recorded that profits had doubled over the previous year. On 30 June 2014, John Tutte became Redrow's chief executive.

In early 2016, the firm achieved a record profit of £104 million during the last six months of 2015 in spite of a downturn in the inner London market. In February 2017, Redrow acquired Radleigh Homes in Derby, an established company which delivered 200 new homes in 2016. It was later re-branded as Redrow Homes (East Midlands). During September 2017, it was announced that Morgan would "ease back" to a non-executive chairman role with Redrow. That same year, Redrow announced that pre-tax profits had risen by 26 per cent to £315 million while revenues were up 20 per vent at £1.66 billion; it also withdrew from its effort to take over rival firm Bovis Homes.

On 18 October 2018, Redrow announced its 100,000th customer and released statistics on the number of direct jobs it had created (36,000), including 2,000 trainees, and a further 200,000 indirect employees. On 7 November 2018, it was announced that Steve Morgan would retire from the company in March 2019 with John Tutte taking over as executive chairman and Matthew Pratt as chief operating officer. One year later, Tutte himself announced his retirement, resulting in Matthew Pratt taking over as group chief executive.

=== 2020s ===
Like most housebuilders, Redrow temporarily closed most of its sites during the COVID-19 pandemic in the United Kingdom during early 2020. The site closures pushed house sales down by a third. In a trading update, Redrow said it had completed 4,032 homes up to 28 June 2020 in comparison to 6,443 in 2019. Turnover was expected to be £1.34bn against £2.11bn in 2019.

In June 2020, following a review of its divisions, Redrow opted to scale-back its London operations to focus on its Colindale Gardens development and announced it would continue to target future growth on the higher returning regional businesses and the Heritage product. That same year, Redrow partnered with Liverpool John Moores University to offer a degree in Construction Management to outside applications. Previously, the degree had only been open to Redrow employees; over 800 applications were received.

During September 2021, Richard Akers became Redrow's non‐executive chairman. That same year, the company announced a new Southern division to expand the company's reach to Surrey and Sussex, which was opened in May 2022.

In November 2021, it joined the UNFCCC Race to Zero and signed up to the Science Based Targets initiative (SBTi), supporting efforts to limit global warming to 1.5°C. In 2022, Redrow was included in the FT-Statista annual climate leaders list of companies achieving the greatest reductions in their Scope 1 and 2 greenhouse gas emissions intensity over a five-year period (2015-20). The company was also admitted to the FTSE4Good Index, for demonstrating strong Environmental, Social and Governance (ESG) practices.

During October 2022, Redrow became one of the first house builders to implement the New Homes Quality Board's new code of practice, an independent not-for-profit organisation that has been set up to offer better protection and increased transparency for customers. In January 2023, Redrow became the first large housebuilder to introduce air source heat pumps in all its upcoming developments as the firm moves away from traditional gas boilers. Underfloor heating would be provided as standard in its detached homes. The move to air source heat pumps will have the biggest impact to date on the efficiency of Redrow homes as it moves towards all-electric power systems in line with its commitment to achieving net zero carbon by 2050.

During December 2023, Redrow developed and launched a new mobile app, helping homeowners find their new home; the app is the first and only one of its type on iOS and Android.

On 7 February 2024, Barratt Developments made an agreed offer to acquire the company for £2.5 billion; on the same date, both firms had confirmed reduced revenue and profit. The merged businesses would create a house builder turning over £7.45bn and delivering over 22,600 homes per year. Subject to regulatory and shareholder approval, the deal was expected to be completed in late 2024, and would see around 800 jobs lost (a 10% reduction in total employees) and nine offices close. In March 2024, the Competition and Markets Authority (CMA) opened an investigation into the proposed acquisition, assessing if it might "result in a substantial lessening of competition within any market or markets in the United Kingdom for goods or services." In May 2024, the proposed merger was approved by shareholders, but remained subject to CMA clearance. In August 2024, the CMA said the proposed merger only raised competition concerns in relation to developments around north Shropshire. Barratt and Redrow could make submissions to address the CMA's concerns to avoid the deal being subject to an in-depth phase two review. On 22 August 2024, Barratt officially took ownership of Redrow shares; both firms continue to operate independently until final CMA approval is granted. On 7 October 2024, after the CMA investigation was closed, the company became Barratt Redrow plc.

In February 2024, Barratt and Redrow were among eight UK house-builders targeted by the CMA in an investigation into suspected breaches of competition law. The CMA said it had evidence that firms shared commercially sensitive information with competitors, influencing the build-out of sites and the prices of new homes. In January 2025, the CMA said it was conducting further investigations into suspected anti-competitive conduct by house-builders; after Barratt acquired Redrow, the number of companies under investigation reduced from eight to seven.

== Flagship developments ==
The company's flagship developments include:

- Woodford Garden Village: the first garden village for over 100 years in North West England being built on over 500 acres of brownfield land, previously used for aircraft manufacturing.
- Ebbsfleet Green, Kent: 950 new homes, along with a village centre, park, sports pitches, a hotel and a pub, and a primary school. This development forms part of plans for a garden city at Ebbsfleet, with up to 15,000 new homes, based predominately on brownfield land, or former quarries. This development, is also part of the NHS Healthy New Towns network.
- Plasdwr: Redrow is developing around 2,000 homes in Plasdwr, north west Cardiff. The £2 billion Cardiff 'garden village' will comprise four different zones, each with a central square and a primary school.
- Colindale Gardens: a £1 billion mixed use development in north west London, which will have more than 2,900 homes. At 47 acres in total, the regeneration utilised a tower block and adjacent land from the Peel Centre, formerly part of the Hendon Police College.
- Ledsham Garden Village: A 105-hectare site in South Wirral will become a sustainable new community of up to 2,000 homes. It will create employment, education and leisure opportunities and green open spaces.
- Amington Garden Village, Tamworth: This 60-hectare former golf course site will feature up to 1,100 new homes and a package of community investment worth £14 million, including funding towards the cost of building a new primary school, a new community woodland and extending the Hodge Lane Local Nature Reserve.

The company has commissioned research by two academics, Stefan Kruczkowski and Laura B. Alvarez, in order to develop eight principles of creating better places.
