= Radyr Hydro Scheme =

Hydroelectric power station in Cardiff

Coordinates: 51.5194°N 3.2538°W

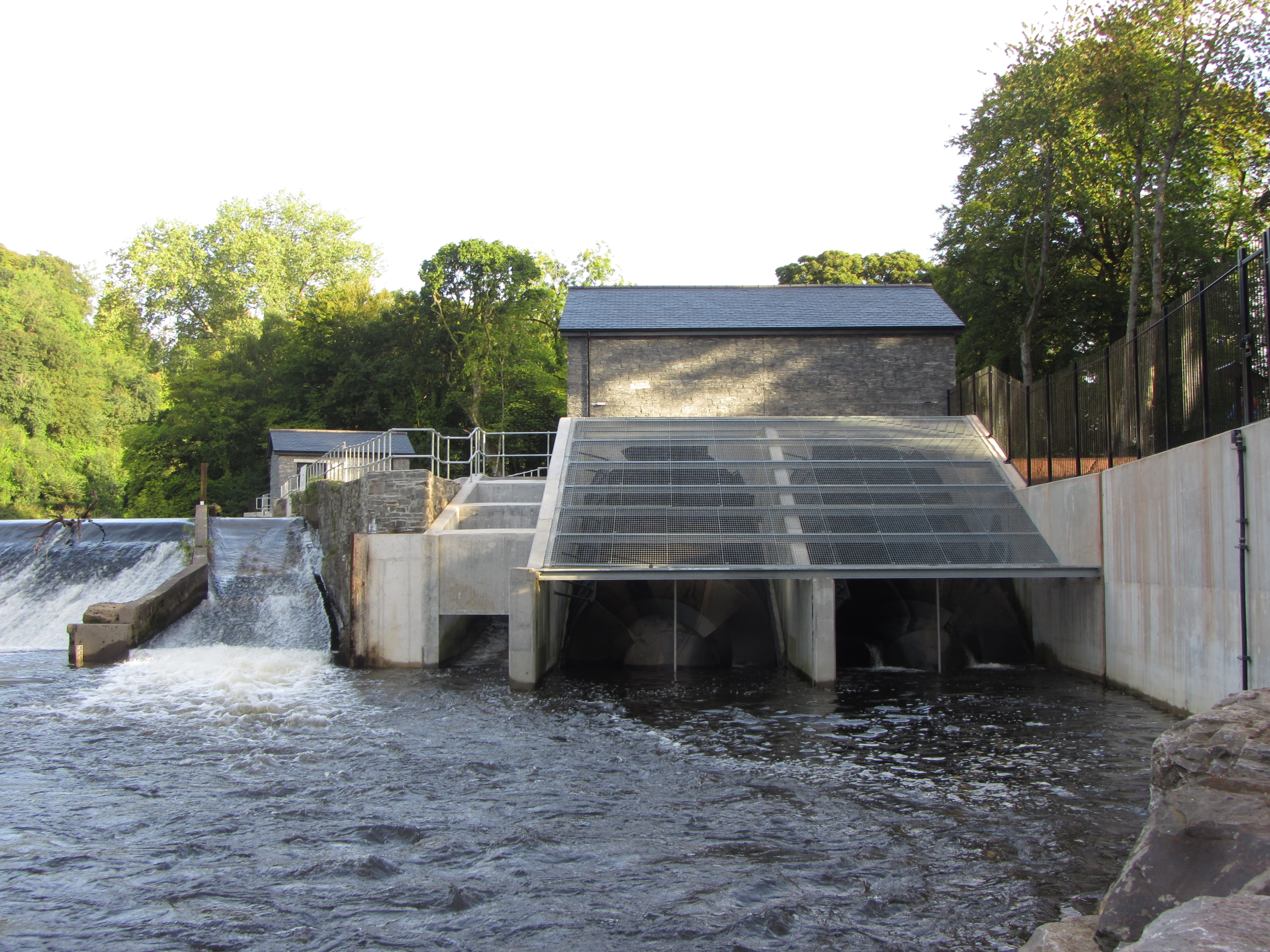

Radyr Hydro Scheme is a 400kW small-scale hydroelectric station located in Radyr, Cardiff, Wales.

The scheme makes use of the roughly 3.5m height difference created by Radyr Weir to push water through two 4-metre-wide (13 ft), 10-metre-long (33 ft) Archimedes screw turbines.

The scheme was constructed in 2015 by Dawnus, being designed by Renewables First and operated by Cardiff Council.

During construction a temporary fish ladder was installed as construction work was likely to coincide with the peak of the upstream migration of salmon.

Cardiff Council built the scheme to supply renewable electricity to 550 homes as part of a commitment to lower carbon emissions and help Cardiff become a "one planet city" by 2050.
