= Rodger Gifford =

Welsh football referee

- Full name: Rodger Gifford
- Born: 12 April 1948 (age 78); Llanbradach, Mid Glamorgan, Wales
- Other occupation: National Referees' Officer

Domestic
Years	League	Role
1976-1984	Football League	Linesman
1984-1992	Football League	Referee
1992-1996	Premier League	Referee

International
Years	League	Role
1986-1995	FIFA and UEFA listed	Referee

Rodger Gifford (born 12 April 1948) is a Welsh former football referee in the English Football League, Premier League, and member of the Welsh FIFA List. During his time on the List he was based in Llanbradach in Mid Glamorgan. He currently works for the Football Association of Wales.

== Career ==
Gifford became a Football League linesman in 1976 at the age of twenty eight. However, it was another eight seasons before he progressed to the Referees List. Nevertheless, he did referee almost the whole of one (old) Football League First Division game long before that, on 15 September 1979, when fellow Welshman Clive Thomas had to go off injured after only two minutes of the 0–0 draw between Bristol City and Stoke City, and Gifford took over, having been the appointed senior linesman.^{†}

Thomas retired in 1984 and, as he left the List, Gifford was one of the new intake. Within two years, he was officiating in Europe, as he took charge of the friendly fixture between Northern Ireland and Denmark at Windsor Park, Belfast, on 23 March 1986, which ended 1-1.

Domestically, he was involved in a notable incident in a match at the City Ground on 3 March 1990, when Manchester City goalkeeper Andy Dibble had the ball in his right hand waiting to clear upfield. Nottingham Forest winger Gary Crosby headed it out of his grasp and kicked the ball into the goal. Gifford ruled that this was fair (correctly following guidelines for the Laws of that era), and it proved to be the only goal of the game.^{‡} A few days later, he took charge of the most senior European tie of his career, as R.F.C. Liégeois played Werder Bremen in a UEFA Cup quarter-final first leg.

Later in the year, he was involved in a European match where a streaker ran across the pitch, despite conditions of "intense cold". This was during the European Cup Winners Cup second round first leg tie between Fram Reykjavík of Iceland and FC Barcelona on 23 October 1990, which the Catalan side won 2–1 with ten men, due to the dismissal of Fernando Muñoz in the 53rd minute.

He took charge of one of the decisive games of the 1991–92 season when Manchester United visited Anfield on 26 April 1992, needing to win to keep alive their hopes of winning the League title. However, Liverpool beat them 2–0, and thereby confirmed Leeds United as the last of the "old" First Division champions.

He was included as one of the referees for the new Premier League which started the following season (1992–93), his first match in the competition being the 2–1 win over Middlesbrough by Southampton at The Dell on 29 August 1992. He retained his position in the top league for the next three seasons before returning to the Football League.

Whilst still officiating in the Premier League on 1 February 1995, he issued the fastest ever red card (at that time) when Blackburn goalkeeper Tim Flowers was dismissed after 72 seconds of the match, for a foul on Brian Deane of Leeds United during the 1–1 draw at Ewood Park. After the match, a fan attempted to attack Gifford.

He refereed his most senior domestic Cup tie in his final season, as Birmingham City defeated Norwich City 2–1 in a Coca-Cola Cup quarter-final replay on 24 January 1996.

He has since become a referees' assessor, a UEFA Referee Observer, and the National Referees Officer for the Welsh FA. At the end of 2006, in response to an impending shortage of assistant referees at Cymru Alliance League level, he circulated a letter informing leagues of the initiation of an FA of Wales referee recruitment drive.

In February 2022 he was charged by the FA with misconduct following the Bristol Rovers v Crawley Town match in League Two on 4 September 2021, at which he was the Match Observer, for abusive and/or insulting and/or improper language, aggravated by a reference to nationality. He admitted the offence and was suspended for eight weeks, fined £200 and ordered to undertake an education programme. In May 2024, he was found guilty of the same offences related to post-match comments following the Newport County AFC v Barnet FC FA Cup match on 2 December 2023 where he was working as the PGMOL referee observer, and suspended from all football and football-related activity for five months, fined £400 and ordered to attend a mandatory face-to-face education programme.
