= Margaret Sara Meggitt =

British political activist and suffragette (1866–1920)

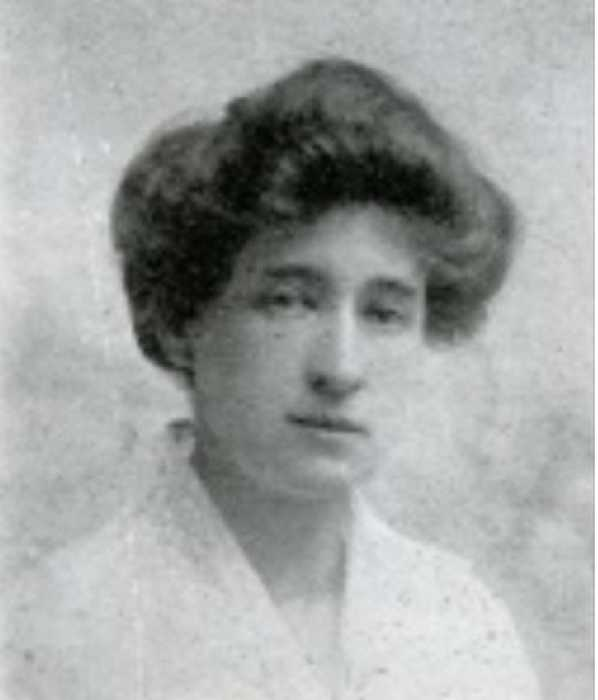
- Born: 1866; Grantham, England
- Died: 21 March 1920 (aged 53–54); Newport, Wales
- Occupations: Educator, Suffragist
- Spouse: George Meggitt

Margaret Sara Meggitt (1866 – 21 March 1920) was a British political activist and suffragette in Newport during the period of World War I. She founded the Newport branch of the National Federation of Women Workers and was the first woman to sit on the Newport Trades and Labour Council.

== Early life ==
She was born in Grantham, Lincolnshire in 1866. She qualified as a teacher before marrying George Meggitt. They moved to Newport in 1907 when her husband became manager of a glue factory.

== Political activity ==
Meggitt was involved in the Suffragette movement in Mansfield and continued her association after moving to Newport, holding meetings in her home at The Cliff, Eveswell, Newport. She joined the Independent Labour Party and worked to help the poor and gave advice and assistance to "women in distress" who called at her home. She frequently wrote letters to the local press, often dealing with women's issues such as war widows' pensions.

Her son, William Meggitt, won the Military Cross while serving with the RAF during World War I.

== Death ==
She died on 21 March 1920 following a serious asthma attack.

== See also ==
- List of suffragists and suffragettes
