= Frank Meggitt =

Welsh cricketer

Frank Meggitt (17 February 1901 – 9 October 1945) was a Welsh cricketer. He was a right-handed batsman and wicket-keeper who played for Glamorgan. He was born in Barry and died in Radyr.

As well as playing cricket, Meggitt also played hockey, winning a Blue at Cambridge University, and representing the Welsh national side, and held a low golf handicap. A club cricketer for Barry Cricket Club, he made his first and only County Championship appearance against Nottinghamshire. However, Meggitt scored a duck in the first innings and just four runs in the second – and lost his place in the lineup.
