= Meggett =

Meggett can refer to:

- Meggett, South Carolina, U.S.
- Dave Meggett (born 1966), American football player
- Davin Meggett (born 1990), American football player
- Emily Meggett (1932–2023), American Geechee-Gullah community leader, chef, and author
