= A468 road =

Road in Wales

A468

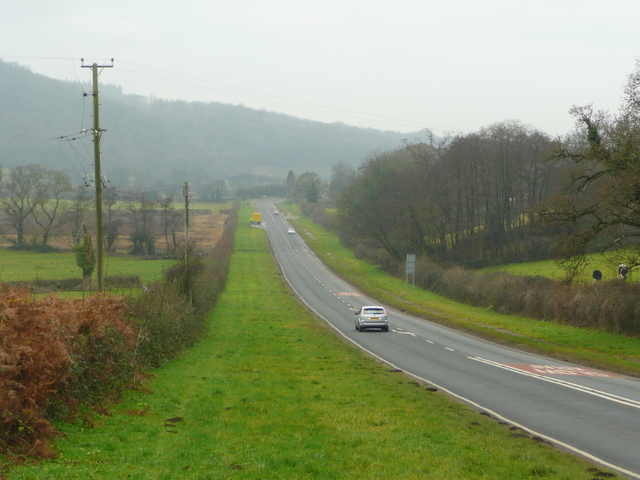

Route information
- Length: 11.9 mi (19.2 km)

Major junctions
- east end: A467 Bassaleg; 51.5759°N 3.0435°W

- A469 A4054

- west end: A470 Nantgarw; 51.5595°N 3.2683°W

Location
- Country: United Kingdom
- Constituent country: Wales
- Primary destinations: Newport, Wales

Road network
- Roads in the United Kingdom; Motorways; A and B road zones
← A467	→ A469

The A468 is a principal road from Newport to Nantgarw. The current route begins at the A467 in Bassaleg then passes through Rhiwderin, Machen, Trethomas, Bedwas and Caerphilly, terminating on the A470.

== History ==
Originally the A468 began at the Handpost Pub at the junction with the former A467 (reclassified to B4240) and proceeded west along Bassaleg Road, passing under a pair of stone arch bridges carrying the Ebbw Valley Railway and the Brecon and Merthyr Railway before reaching the current starting point.
