= Tynycwm Halt railway station =

Disused railway station in Risca, Caerphilly

Tynycwm Halt

General information
- Location: Risca, Monmouthshire; Wales
- Coordinates: 51.6029°N 3.0831°W
- Grid reference: ST250898
- Platforms: 1

Other information
- Status: Disused

History
- Original company: Great Western Railway

Key dates
- 17 April 1935: Opened
- 30 April 1962: Closed
Location

Tynycwm Halt railway station served the town of Risca, Monmouthshire, Wales, from 1935 to 1962 on the Monmouthshire Railway.

== History ==
The station was opened on 17 April 1935 by the Great Western Railway. It closed on 30 April 1962.

Preceding station	Disused railways	Following station
Risca; Line and station open	Great Western Railway; Monmouthshire Railway	Rogerstone; Line and station open
