= Ebbw Vale Parkway railway station =

Railway station in Blaenau Gwent, Wales

Ebbw Vale Parkway Welsh: Parcffordd Glyn Ebwy
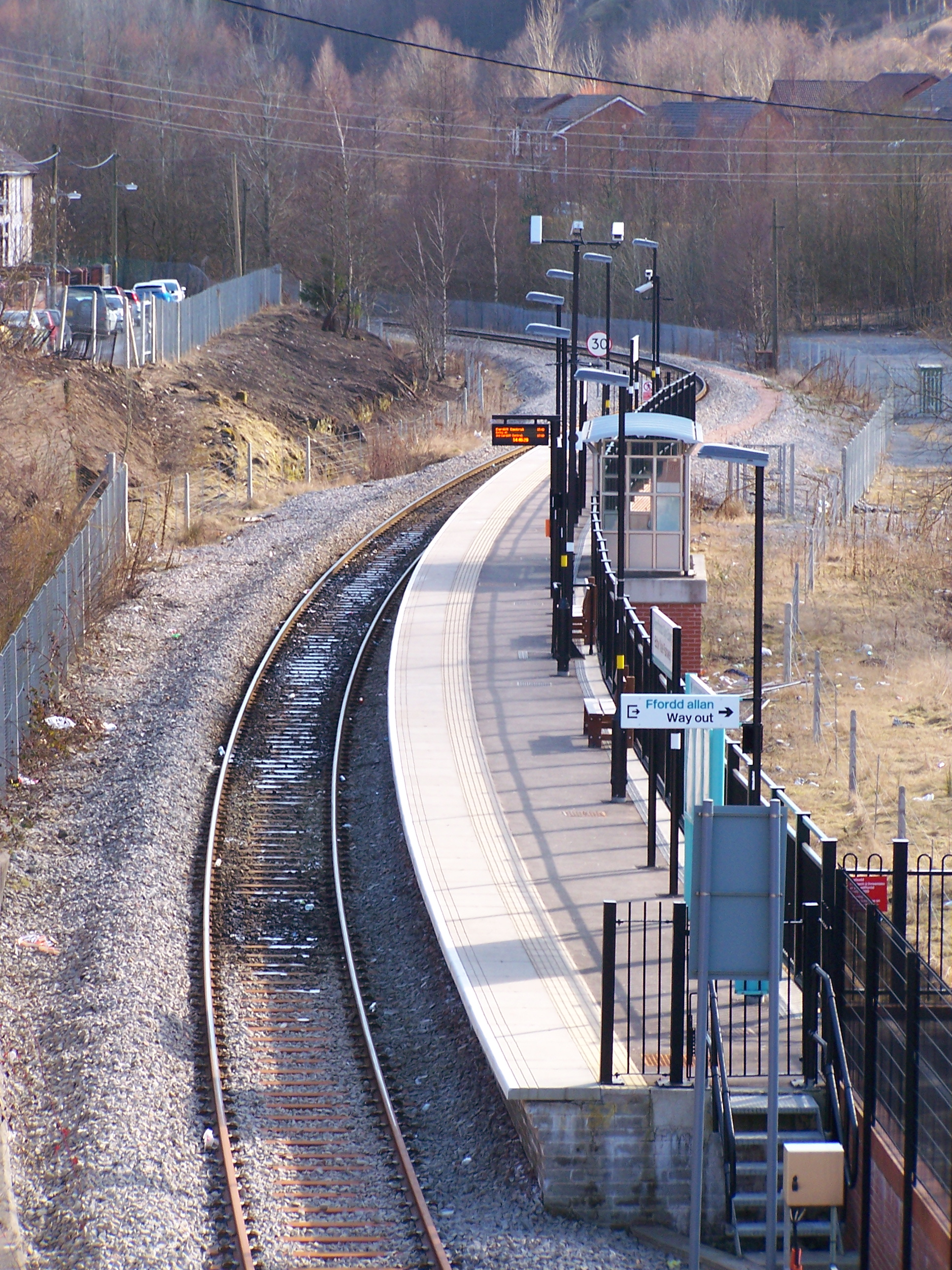

General information
- Location: Ebbw Vale, Blaenau Gwent; Wales
- Coordinates: 51°45′24″N 3°11′46″W
- Grid reference: SO175070
- Owner: Network Rail
- Manager: Transport for Wales
- Platforms: 1

Other information
- Station code: EBV
- Classification: DfT category F1

History
- Original company: Network Rail

Key dates
- August 1852: Opened as Victoria (Blaenau Gwent)
- 30 April 1962: Closed
- 6 February 2008: Reopened as Ebbw Vale Parkway

Passengers
- 2021/22: ▲24,918
- 2022/23: ▲30,452
- 2023/24: ▼28,534
- 2024/25: ▲40,736
- 2025/26: ▲42,798
Location
Notes
- Passenger statistics from the Office of Rail and Road

Ebbw Vale Parkway railway station (Welsh: Gorsaf reilffordd Parcffordd Glyn Ebwy) is a station on the Ebbw Valley Railway in Wales. The station opened on 6 February 2008 when services to and from Cardiff Central commenced after 46 years of being a freight-only line. A northwards extension of the line to a new terminus at Ebbw Vale Town opened on 17 May 2015, which accounts for the drop in usage in 2015–16. A direct service to Newport was expected to commence in 2018 following double-tracking and re-signalling works between Aberbeeg and Crosskeys, but this has now been pushed back to 2021.

The station has been built on the site of the former Victoria station in the Victoria area of the Ebbw Vale conurbation. It consists of a single platform adjacent to Glan Ebbw Terrace, close to the A4046 Station Road.

== Services ==
Today, the current service is two trains per hour consisting of one to Cardiff Central and one to Newport, both calling at Llanhilleth, Newbridge, Crosskeys, Risca, Rogerstone and Pye Corner. The journey times to Cardiff is approximately fifty minutes. Occasional services continue beyond Cardiff to Swansea, Bridgend or Maesteg.

Services are usually operated by Class 150 or 153 Sprinter units.

Demand for travel to and from the station was seriously under-estimated by the promoters of the line's reopening, even though the service provided was to Cardiff only and not to Newport as well, as originally assumed. For example, in 2008–09, usage at the station was forecast to be 50,000, for journeys on the lines to Cardiff and to Newport, but was actually about 250,000, for journeys on the line to Cardiff only. Part of the reason for the demand under-forecast was the requirement that no demand from regeneration of the former steelworks area should be assumed.

Preceding station	National Rail	Following station
Ebbw Vale Town	Transport for Wales; Ebbw Vale Town – Cardiff Central	Llanhilleth

== Bus interchange ==
The station is a thirty eight minute walk (1.8 miles) from Ebbw Vale bus station (known as Inner Bypass), which is the terminus for a number of Stagecoach South Wales services to Cardiff, Abergavenny, Brynmawr, Tredegar, and other nearby villages.

The station is closest served by the bus stop at Waunlwyd on the A4046. There are bus connections from here to nearby communities such as Cwm, the Garden Festival Shopping site, Ysbyty Aneurin Bevan and Ebbw Vale Town itself.

== Peter Law plaque ==
A plaque at the railway station commemorates local MP and Assembly Member Peter Law, who died in 2006, in honour of his work to re-open the line.
