= Abercarn railway station =

Railway station in Abercarn, Wales

Coordinates: 51.6503°N 3.1377°W

Abercarn

General information
- Location: Abercarn, Caerphilly; Wales
- Grid reference: ST213951
- Platforms: 2

Other information
- Status: Disused

History
- Original company: Monmouthshire Railway and Canal Company
- Pre-grouping: Great Western Railway
- Post-grouping: Great Western Railway

Key dates
- 21 December 1850: Opened
- 7 December 1959: Closed to goods
- 30 April 1962: Closed to passengers
Location

Abercarn railway station served the town of Abercarn, in the county of Monmouthshire.

== History ==
The Monmouthshire Railway and Canal Company opened Abercarn railway station on 21 December 1850. The station was resited following a deviation of the line in c.1867. It became part of the Great Western Railway on 1 August 1880 when the Monmouthshire Railway was taken over, having been leased to the Great Western from 1 August 1875.

In 1948 the station became part of the Western Region of British Railways upon nationalisation. The British Transport Commission closed it to passengers on 30 April 1962, after it had previously been closed to goods traffic on 7 December 1959.

Preceding station	Historical railways	Following station
Celynen South Halt; Line open, station closed	Great Western Railway; Monmouthshire Railway and Canal Company	Chapel Bridge; Line open, station closed

== The site today ==
Trains on the reopened Ebbw Valley Railway pass the site between Cross Keys and Newbridge stations. Abercarn no longer has a station, although the site was one of those considered at the project's planning stage.
