= Bassaleg Junction railway station =

Disused railway station in Bassaleg, Newport, Wales

Bassaleg Junction
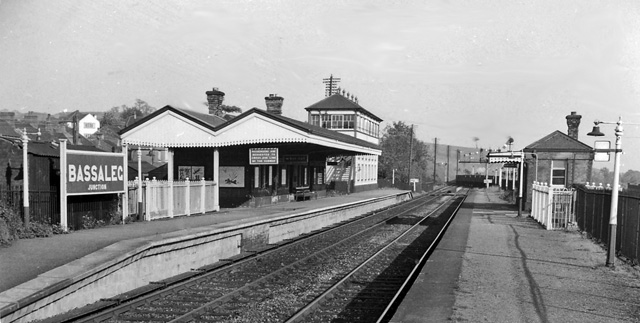
- Station in 1962.

General information
- Location: Bassaleg, Newport; Wales
- Coordinates: 51.579°N 3.038°W
- Grid reference: ST281872
- Platforms: 2

Other information
- Status: Disused

History
- Original company: Monmouthshire Railway and Canal Company
- Pre-grouping: Great Western Railway
- Post-grouping: Great Western Railway

Key dates
- 21 December 1850: Opens
- 1 September 1898: Closed to goods
- 1 January 1917: Closed
- 1 March 1919: Reopened
- 30 April 1962: Closed
Location

Bassaleg Junction was a railway station which served the village of Bassaleg, Monmouthshire.

== History ==
The station was opened by the Monmouthshire Railway and Canal Company on 21/23 December 1850. It appeared in timetables as "Rhymney Junction" before changing to "Bassaleg Junction" in 1858. At times, the station was sometimes referred to in Bradshaw as "Rhymney Junction for Bassaleg and Machen" and at times spelt as "Bassalleg". The line was worked by the Great Western Railway from 1 August 1875 and it later took over the Monmouthshire Railway with effect from 1 August 1880. The station closed to goods traffic on 1 September 1898.

The station closed as a wartime measure between 1 January 1917 and 1 March 1919. It closed on 30 April 1962, leaving the line to remain open for goods traffic.

Preceding station	Historical railways	Following station
Rogerstone; Line and station open	Great Western Railway; Monmouthshire Railway and Canal	Newport Dock Street; Line partly open, station closed
Bassaleg; Line and station closed	Brecon and Merthyr Tydfil Junction Railway; Rumney Railway	Newport Dock Street; Line partly open, station closed
Rogerstone; Line and station open	Monmouthshire Railway and Canal Company	Newport Courtybella; Line partly open, station closed

== Present day ==
Trains on the Ebbw Valley Railway pass along the old line, which was upgraded to deal with the new traffic after its use as a freight line for defunct Ebbw Vale steel works for several years. The site has housed four large self-built houses since around 1989. The old lantern room, used by railway workers to lunch, has recently been renovated by the current owners of the house on whose land it sits. The building has been painted the old Great Western Railway colours (light stone and dark stone) and a historic replica railway sign reading 'Pye Corner' is visible from the road, named after the street address and road junction.

A station named Pye Corner opened close to the site of Bassaleg Junction in 2014.
