= Cwmcarn railway station =

Disused railway station in Cwmcarn, Monmouthshire

Cwmcarn
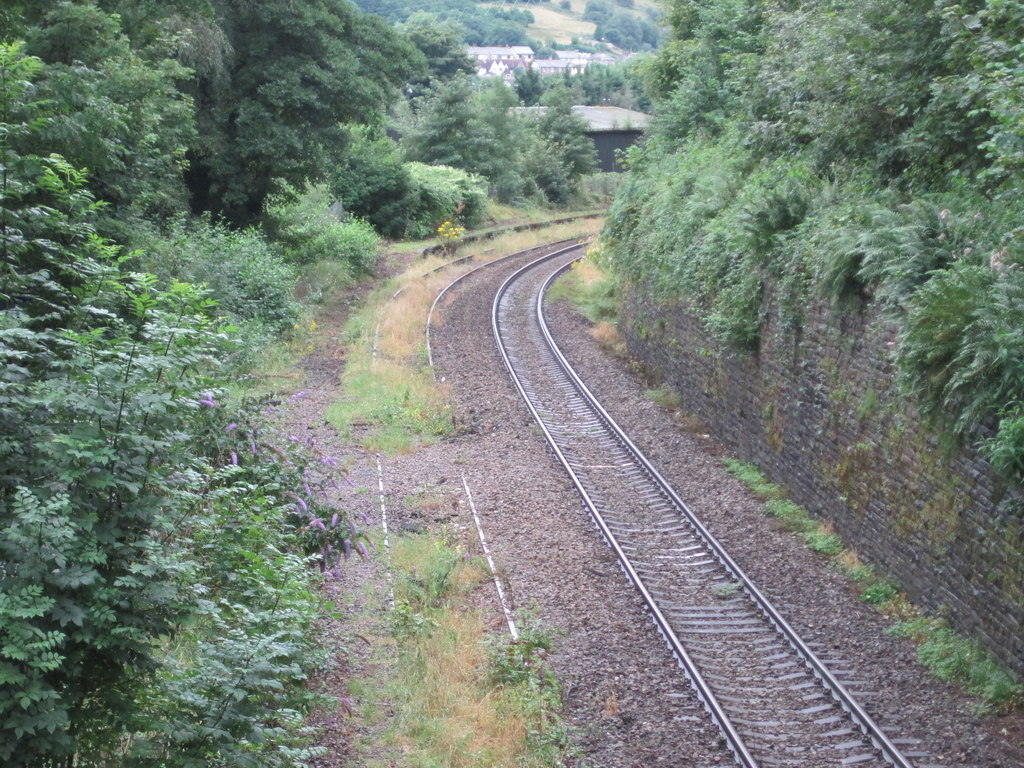

General information
- Location: Cwmcarn, Monmouthshire; Wales
- Coordinates: 51.6356°N 3.1347°W
- Grid reference: ST215935
- Platforms: 2

Other information
- Status: Disused

History
- Original company: Monmouthshire Railway and Canal Company
- Pre-grouping: Monmouthshire Railway and Canal Company; Great Western Railway

Key dates
- May 1855: Opened as Chapel Bridge
- 1 July 1876: Closed
- 2 March 1925: Reopened as Cwmcarn
- 30 April 1962: Closed permanently
Location

Cwmcarn railway station served the village of Cwmcarn, Monmouthshire from 1855 to 1962 on the Ebbw Valley Railway. Passenger services through site resumed in 2008 using a single line although there are plans to restore the double track.

== History ==
The station opened in May 1855 by the Monmouthshire Railway and Canal Company. It closed on 1 July 1876, but reopened as Cwmcarn on 2 March 1925, before closing permanently on 30 April 1962.

Preceding station	Disused railways	Following station
Abercarn; Line open, station closed	Monmouthshire Railway and Canal Company; Ebbw Valley Railway	Crosskeys
