= Llanhilleth railway station =

Railway station in Blaenau Gwent, Wales

Llanhilleth Welsh: Llanhiledd
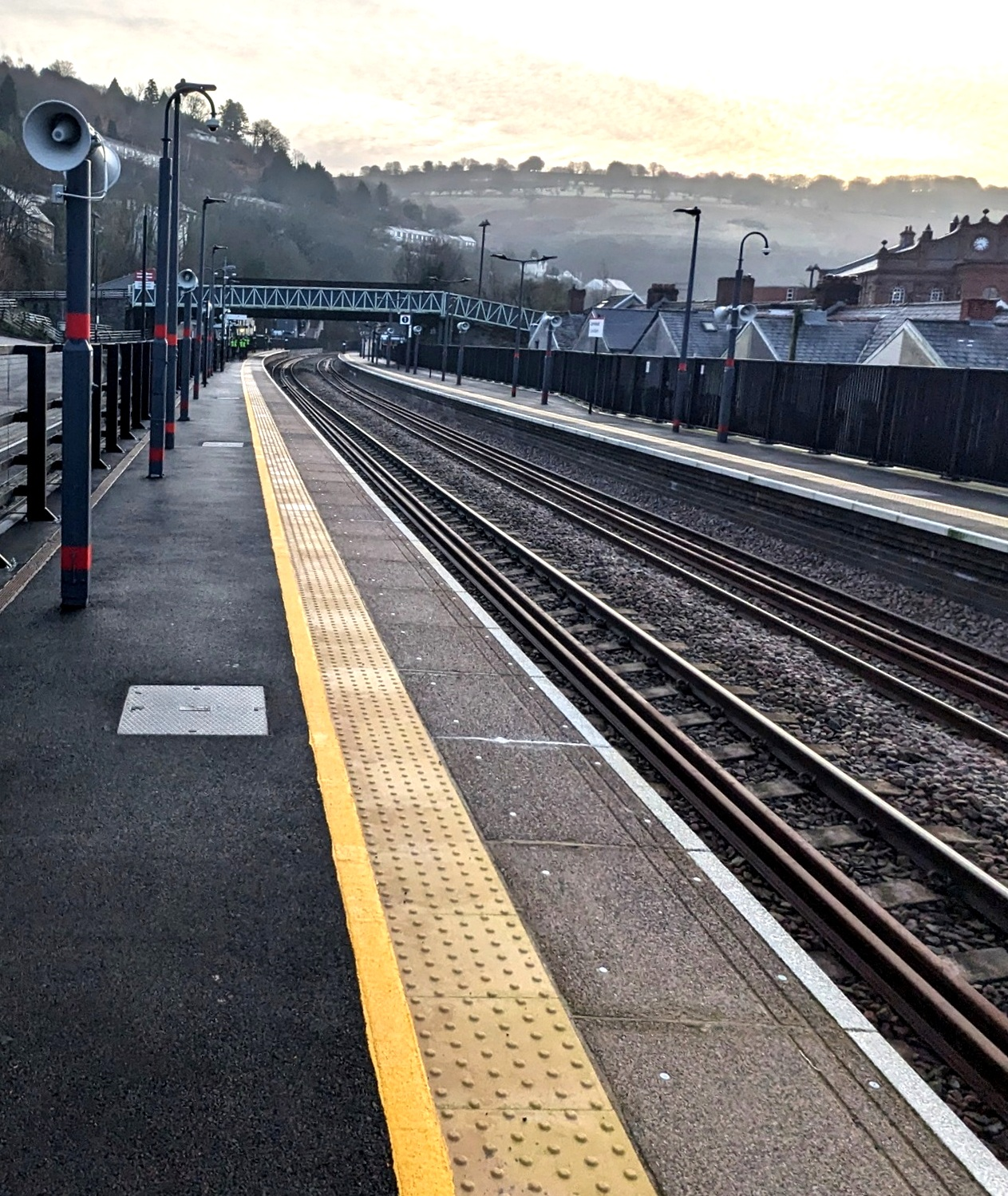
- The station in 2024

General information
- Location: Llanhilleth, Blaenau Gwent; Wales
- Coordinates: 51°42′1.22″N 3°8′13.32″W
- Grid reference: SO216007
- Owner: Network Rail
- Manager: Transport for Wales
- Platforms: 2

Other information
- Station code: LTH
- Classification: DfT category F2

History
- Original company: Great Western Railway
- Pre-grouping: Great Western Railway
- Post-grouping: Great Western Railway

Key dates
- 1 October 1901: Station opened
- 30 April 1962: Closed
- 27 April 2008: Reopened

Passengers
- 2020/21: ▼11,884
- 2021/22: ▲53,112
- 2022/23: ▲66,510
- 2023/24: ▼63,068
- 2024/25: ▲94,018
Location
Notes
- Passenger statistics from the Office of Rail and Road

Llanhilleth railway station (Welsh: Llanhiledd) is a railway station on the Ebbw Valley Railway and serves the village of Llanhilleth, Wales.

== History ==
=== Original station ===
The original Llanhilleth railway station was opened by the Great Western Railway on 1 October 1901, but it was closed on 30 April 1962

=== Station reopened ===
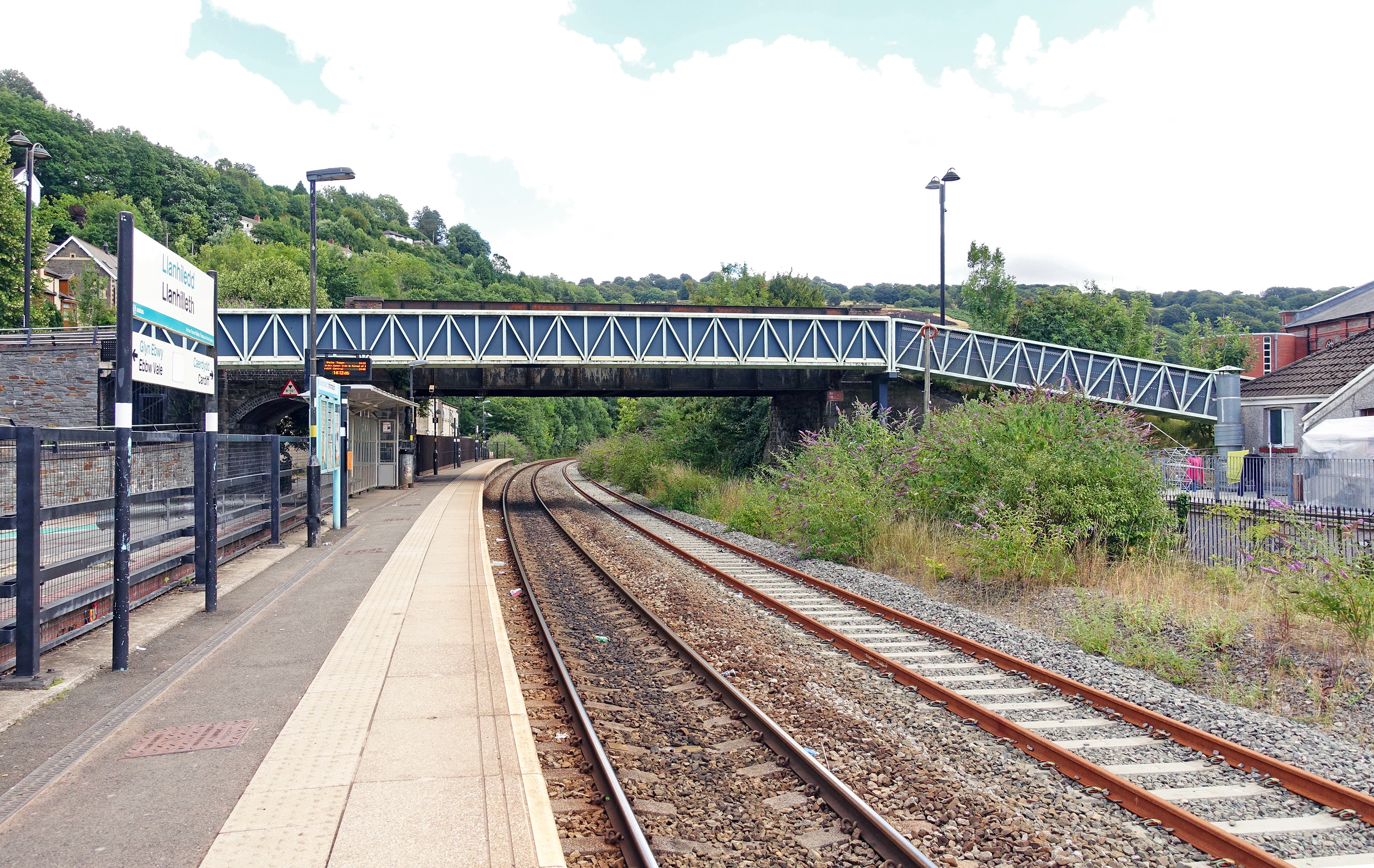
The station in 2018

The station reopened on 27 April 2008, nearly three months after services between Cardiff Central and Ebbw Vale Parkway railway station commenced.

The present station is situated slightly to the East of the old one, to the rear of properties on Commercial Road, and opposite Railway Street, near the former station location. Access to the station and car park is provided off Commercial Road. The station opened with a single platform to serve both directions, a second one has since been added. The Ebbw Vale line received upgrades since reopening, with the branch extended to Ebbw Vale Town, and with an additional station opened at Pye Corner.

=== Second platform added ===
To accommodate an hourly train from Ebbw Vale Town to Newport a passing loop and second platform have been built at Newbridge and Llanhilleth, opening on 4 December 2023.

== Services ==
The normal service on Monday to Saturday is two trains per hour in each direction; these terminate at Ebbw Vale Town northbound and Cardiff Central or Newport. On Sundays, the Newport service is extended to Cardiff Central, and the direct service to Cardiff avoiding Newport does not run.

Preceding station	National Rail	Following station
Ebbw Vale Parkway	Transport for Wales; Cardiff Central - Ebbw Vale Town	Newbridge
