= Rail linc =

Welsh bus transport brand name

Rail Linc
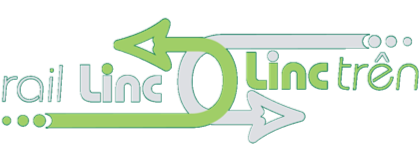
- Commenced operation: 2008
- Alliance: South East Wales Transport Alliance
- Routes: 905
- Stations: Rhoose Cardiff International Airport railway station
- Operator: Adventure Travel
- Website: https://www.cardiff-airport.com/by-bus/

rail linc (Welsh: linc trên) is a brand name applied to routes formerly operating under the now-defunct South East Wales Transport Alliance- but now operating under Adventure Travel.

== History ==
In a number of cases, the services were set up sometime after rail services to the villages were axed as part of Dr Beeching's rationalisation of the British Rail network; however some services provide a link to villages that never had a railway station.

When the South East Wales Transport Alliance stood down, control of routes passed over to councils to manage and put out to tender. Vale of Glamorgan Borough Council manage the 905, with all others having since been withdrawn

== Rail Linc routes ==
=== Route 901 ===
The 901 was previously numbered the RL5 but was brought under the 'Rail Linc' brand as what we know today - the 901. The service was originally operated by Clarkes Coaches, but ceased operation in 2011. The 901 was then operated by VR Travel of Merthyr Tydfil up until 2013 where it sold to Adventure Travel.

The 901 was put under review by Caerphilly County Borough Council as part of their budget cuts in 2020. As of September 2021, it ran hourly between Blackwood and Ystrad Mynach railway station.

The 901 was withdrawn after operation on the 22nd of July 2023.

=== Route 902 ===
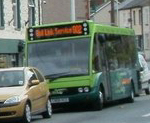
Rail Linc 902 seen in Maerdy

The 902 was previously a route that ran between Maerdy and Ystrad Rhondda railway station, and provided by Thomas of Rhondda. The service was operated using a dedicated Optare Solo. The route ceased in 2012 due to low ridership.

=== Route 903 ===
The 903 was previously a route than ran between Rhigos and Aberdare railway station, and provided by Clarkes Coaches. The service was operated using a dedicated Optare Solo. The route ceased in 2011 due to Clarkes Coaches ceasing trading.

The 903 was also previously a route that ran between Rogerstone railway station and Newport railway station and provided by Stagecoach South Wales. The service was operated using a dedicated Optare Solo. The 903 was again withdrawn in 2013 due to low ridership.

=== Route 904 ===
The 904 was previously a route that ran between Caerau and Maesteg railway station, and provided by Llynfi Coaches. The service was operated using a dedicated Optare Solo. The route ceased in 2011 due to low ridership.

=== Route 905 ===
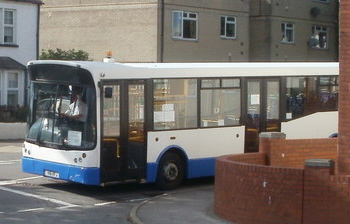
Rail Linc 905 seen in Rhoose

The 905 is the only surviving route of the rail linc name. The service runs between Cardiff Airport and Rhoose Cardiff International Airport railway station, and provided by Adventure Travel. The service was previously operated by Crossgates Coaches, but passed to NAT Group when Crossgates Coaches ceased trading in 2013.

=== Route 906 ===
The 906 was previously a route that ran between Rassau and Ebbw Vale Parkway railway station and provided by Clarkes Coaches. The service was operated using a dedicated Optare Solo. The route ceased in 2011 due to Clarkes Coaches ceasing trading.

=== Route 907 ===
The 907 was previously a route that ran between Rogerstone railway station and Newport railway station and provided by Newport Bus. The service was operated using a dedicated Optare Solo for some of the time that the route was in operation. The route ceased in mid-2010 due to low ridership.

The route was then brought back as the new 903 in 2012, operated by Stagecoach South Wales. See the 'Route 903' section for more information on this.

=== Route 908 ===
The 908 was previously a route than ran between Abertillery and Llanhilleth railway station and provided by Henleys Buses. The route ceased in 2009 due to low ridership.
