= Crosskeys railway station =

Railway station in Caerphilly, Wales

Crosskeys
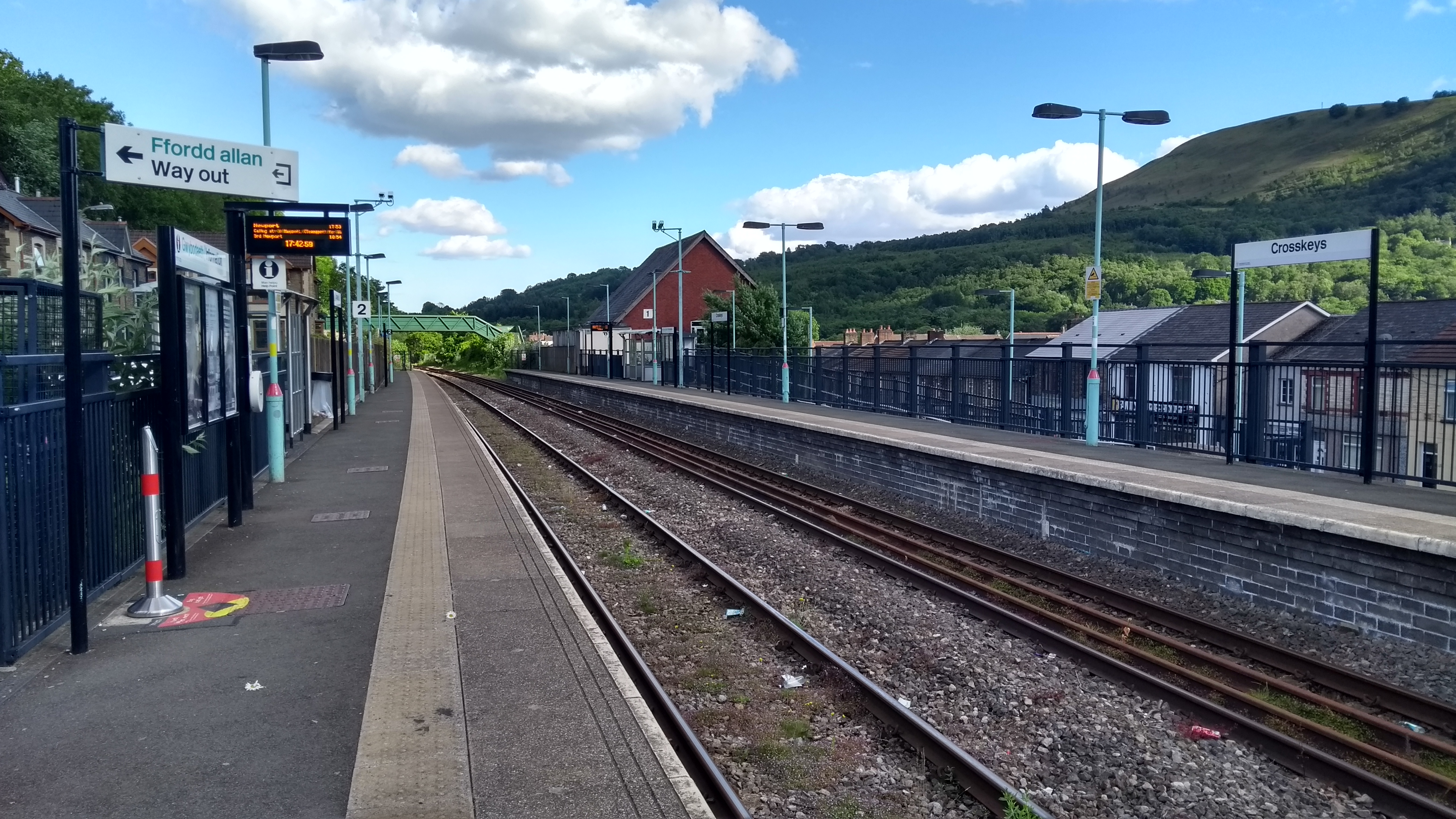

General information
- Location: Crosskeys, Caerphilly; Wales
- Coordinates: 51°37′15″N 3°07′33″W
- Grid reference: ST221919
- Owner: Network Rail
- Manager: Transport for Wales
- Platforms: 2

Other information
- Station code: CKY
- Classification: DfT category F2

History
- Original company: Monmouthshire Railway and Canal Company
- Pre-grouping: Great Western Railway
- Post-grouping: Great Western Railway

Key dates
- December 1850: Line opened
- June 1851: Crossing used as station
- About August 1851: Station opened as Cross Keys
- 30 April 1962: Station closed to passengers
- 7 June 2008: Station reopened to passengers as Crosskeys

Passengers
- 2020/21: ▼12,474
- 2021/22: ▲53,018
- 2022/23: ▲72,072
- 2023/24: ▼63,340
- 2024/25: ▲91,558
Location
Notes
- Passenger statistics from the Office of Rail and Road

Crosskeys railway station is a station serving the village of Crosskeys in the Caerphilly County Borough in Wales. It is on the Ebbw Valley Railway.

The station is situated behind houses on Risca Road and Carlton Terrace. The access to the station is via a one-way system off High Street exiting via Carlton Terrace.

Crosskeys is a two-platform station and there is no car park. The station provides good access to the village and Crosskeys College.

The station marks the end of the double-track passing loop between Risca and Crosskeys; upon leaving Crosskeys trains enter the single track which extends to the railhead in Ebbw Vale Town.

== History ==
The line through the station site opened on 23 December 1850, at this time there was no station, it was not mentioned in the newspaper report of the line opening nor in the first published timetable. By June 1851 trains were ordered to stop at the level crossing here as soon as booking arrangements were complete. This was not uncommon practice in the early days of railways when trains could be boarded at designated stopping-places, passengers clambering aboard from the lineside having purchased tickets from a nearby inn. There was a station on the site by August 1851 as from then it appeared in the timetable, at this time there were two trains each day in each direction, terminating at Newport Courtybella and Blaina. (Note: According to Quick (2023) citing material in the minutes of Monmouthshire Railway and Canal Company the station was not ordered until January 1863 and opened sometime after then.)

The station re-opened on 7 June 2008, four months after services recommenced on the line.

The station name formerly used by the railways was spelt as two words, the Ordnance Survey using the spelling as one word Crosskeys and the re-opened station has taken this spelling as well.

== Services ==
On Mondays to Saturdays, there are two trains an hour between Cardiff Central or Newport and Ebbw Vale Town in each direction. On Sundays, the Cardiff to Ebbw Vale service runs via Newport every two hours.

Preceding station	National Rail	Following station
Risca and Pontymister	Transport for Wales; Cardiff / Newport - Ebbw Vale Town	Newbridge
	Historical railways	
Risca; Line open, station closed	Great Western Railway; Monmouthshire Railway and Canal Company	Cwmcarn; Line open, station closed

== Bibliography ==
- Biddle, Gordon (1997). "stations, passenger". In Simmons, Jack; Biddle, Gordon (eds.). The Oxford Companion to British Railway History From 1603 to the 1990s (1st ed.). Oxford: Oxford University Press. pp. 473–475. ISBN 0-19-211697-5.
- Bradshaw, George (2011) [December 1895]. Bradshaw's Rail Times for Great Britain and Ireland December 1895: A Reprint of the Classic Timetable Complete with Period Advertisements and Shipping Connections to All Parts. Midhurst: Middleton Press. ISBN 978-1-908174-11-6. OCLC 832579861.
- Quick, Michael (2023) [2001]. Railway passenger stations in Great Britain: a chronology (PDF). version 5.05. Railway & Canal Historical Society.
