= Pontymister =

Coordinates: 51°36′N 3°06′W

Pontymister (Welsh:Pont-y-meistr) is a small village in Caerphilly county borough in Wales.

== Location ==
Pontymister is attached to its neighbour, the town of Risca.

== History ==
Originally a farm called Tŷ Isaf, the village came about as a need for housing for the local steel mill and chemical works workforces. Most houses were built in 1920–1925.

From the late 1800s there were a number of heavy industries, (steel and chemical), based alongside the River Ebbw. The name Pontymister is said to have come about as the staff were paid from an office built alongside the bridge that connected Tŷ Isaf to Ochrwyth. The bridge became known as the master's bridge, Pont-y-Meistr.

Pontymister steelworks was famous for being the graveyard for steam trains. Many were brought there in the early 1960s for their scrap value. Some were saved and moved on to Barry Docks.

== Amenities ==
The Cistercian Way waymarked long distance footpath passes through Pontymister.

The village is served by Risca and Pontymister railway station which has direct train services to Cardiff Central and Ebbw Vale Parkway.
