= Patrick Killian =

UK-based artist (born 1974)

- Born: Patrick John Killian; October 26, 1974 (age 51); South Wales, UK
- Education: Carmarthenshire college of Art, Wales, UK
- Website: www.killianart.com

Patrick John Killian (born October 26, 1974) is a UK-based artist known for his paintings in combat sports niche.

== Background ==
Born in 1974 in South Wales, UK; Killian grew up in Cwmcarn, a small village in the valleys of Wales. He attended Crosskeys college of Art & Design before gaining a Diploma in Illustration with distinction at Carmarthenshire college of Art.

== Career ==
Killian started a career in the art world as a creator of portraits of notable figures. His diversity in the art world ranges from pop icons to sporting legends as well as private commissions from the rich and famous.

Killian is notable for his work in combat sports as his paintings capture the intensity, focus and determination of the fighters. The portraits are sought after by notable art collectors in the boxing and MMA world as his portraits document important stages and career changing moments in his subjects.

Killian was commissioned by the Atlantic City Boxing Hall of Fame to produce a series of paintings to present to each of the inductees in Atlantic City. He also produced cover Art for the official programme. He was announced as the official Artist to the Atlantic City Boxing Hall of Fame in June 2019.

Killian has exhibited several of his works at various events across the UK, United States and beyond.

In 2021 Pat Killian became the official Artist to the Fighters Only brand - including bespoke artwork for its International Magazine and The Fighters Only World Mixed Martial Arts Awards.

In October 2022, Killian was commissioned by the World Boxing Organization (WBO) to produce an iconic painting of World Heavyweight Champion Oleksandr Usyk and present it at the Convention in Puerto Rico. His work of Katie Taylor vs. Amanda Serrano was used on the Convention's programme cover.

In December 2022, Killian painted live at the 14th Fighters Only World MMA Awards at the Sahara Las Vegas, presenting winners with Bespoke Original works.

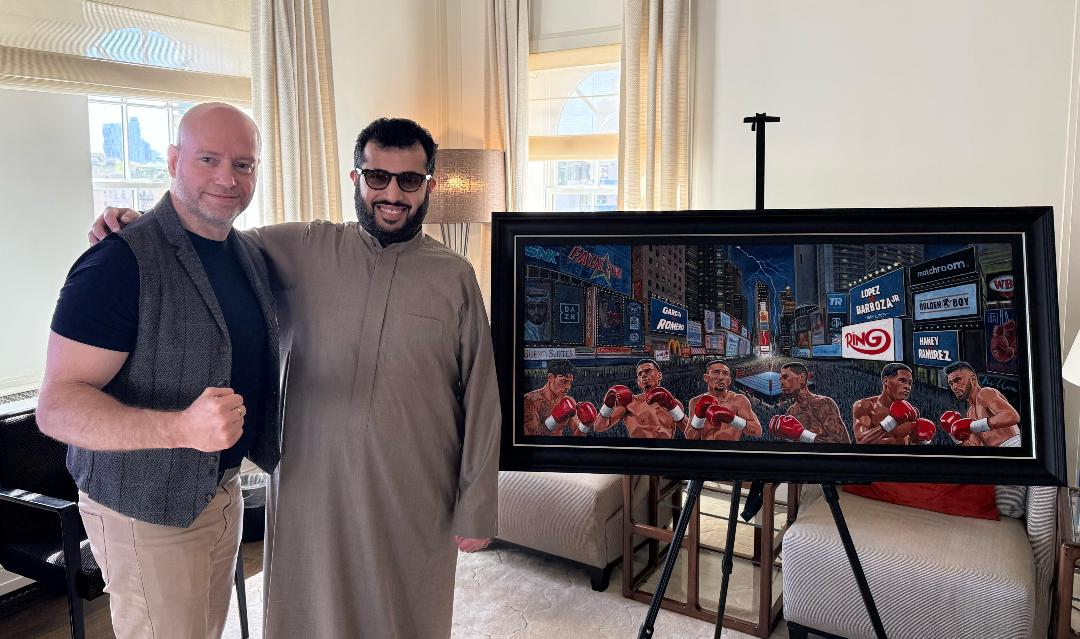
Patrick J. Killian with Turki Al Sheikh

Also in December 2022, Killian was commissioned by the World Boxing Association (WBA) to produce a special 100 year painting to commemorate its centennial year. Painting live at the Caribe Royale Hotel WBA Convention. Killian was awarded by the WBA President Gilberto Mendoza for his contribution to Art in Boxing during the presentation evening in Orlando, Florida.

In April 2025, Turki Al Sheik acquired Killian's latest painting of Fatal Fury in Times Square, featuring all six fighters: Ryan Garcia, Rolando Romero, Teofimo Lopez, Arnold Barboza, Devin Haney and Jose Ramirez amidst the Times Square sky line.

== See also ==
- combat sports
