= Risca =

Coordinates: 51.608°N 3.091°W

Risca: Welsh: Rhisga
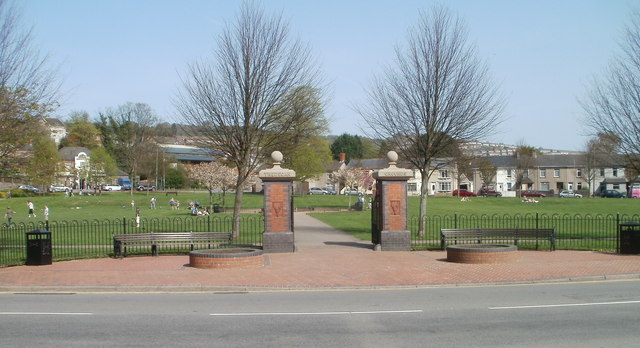
- A view of the Tredegar Park gates, Risca

- Location within Caerphilly
- Population: 11,228
- Language: English; Cymraeg (Welsh)
- OS grid reference: ST245905
- Principal area: Caerphilly
- Country: Wales
- Sovereign state: United Kingdom
- Post town: NEWPORT
- Postcode district: NP11
- Dialling code: 01633
- Police: Gwent
- Fire: South Wales
- Ambulance: Welsh
- UK Parliament: Newport West and Islwyn
- Senedd Cymru – Welsh Parliament: Casnewydd Islwyn

Risca (Welsh: Rhisga) is a town in the Caerphilly County Borough and within the historic boundaries of Monmouthshire in south-east Wales. It has a population of 11,228.

The town lies at the south-eastern edge of the South Wales Coalfield and has been shaped by mining, together with other heavy industries, for many centuries.

Risca is home to Ty-Sign, a large housing estate built in the early 1960s as a satellite village for the then new Llanwern steelworks.

Risca has a rural aspect and is surrounded to the east and west by several extensively wooded hills, including Mynydd Machen (1,188 ft; 362 m) and Twmbarlwm (1,375 ft; 419 m), which attract tourists for the hillwalking and mountain bikers to Cwmcarn Forest Drive.

Risca has a railway station on the Ebbw Valley Railway, reopened in February 2008.

== History ==
There is evidence of human habitation in the Risca area going back thousands of years, such as the Silures hillfort on nearby Twmbarlwm; however, the area was rural and sparsely populated until the nineteenth century. As local industries expanded and transport links improved with the building of the canal and railways, the population rapidly increased.

Several arguments have been put forward for the derivation of the name Risca/Rhisga including that it comes from the Welsh yr is cae, meaning "the lower field", or yr hesg cae, meaning "field or rushes", or rhisgl, meaning oak bark.

The earliest known official use of the name Risca for the place was in 1476 when two men from Risca were charged at the Newport Assizes, although there are also ecclesiastical documents going as far back as 1146 which include mentions of a man called Kadmore de Risca.

From 1540, Risca is found regularly in land transactions involving the Tredegar estates and in 1747 John Wesley recorded a visit in his diary.

Rapid population increase started around 1820 with the opening of the mines.

Year	Population
1851	2,044
1861	2,744
1871	3,400
1891	7,783
1906	11,200
1911	14,149
1921	16,745
1931	16,605
1951	15,130
1961	13,955
1971	15,835
1991	11,543
2001	11,455
2011	11,693
2021	11,228

Note: Until the 1990s, these figures include the population of the nearby villages of Crosskeys and Pontymister but since the reorganisation of wards only include the population of Risca East and Risca West wards.

=== Industrial heritage ===
From the early nineteenth century, the area around Risca was dominated by coal mining and transport systems to access the mines, although there is also evidence that lead and coal were being extracted much earlier.

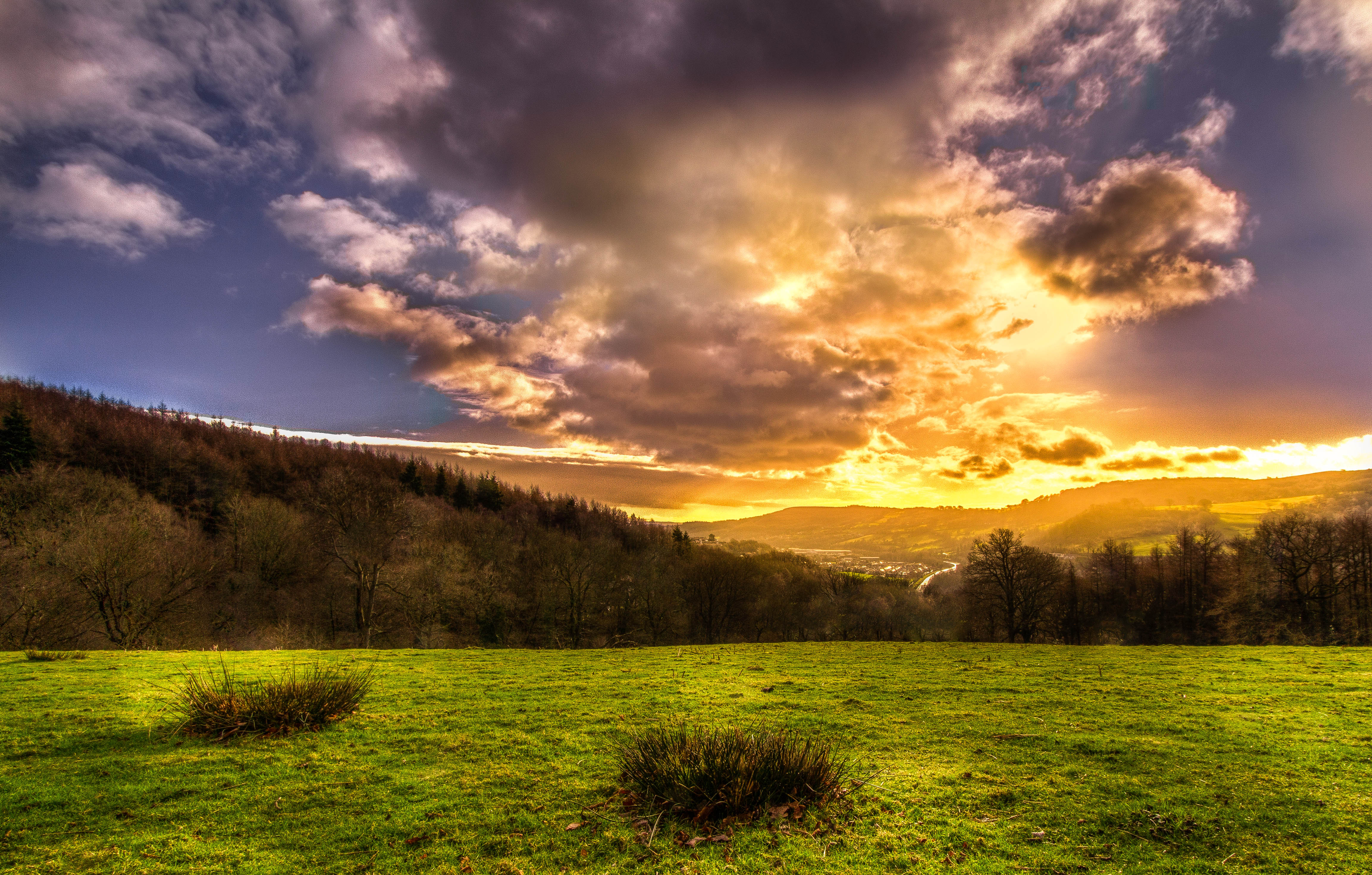
View over Risca

The first large-scale mine was the Black Vein Colliery, which was located near to the boundary between Risca and what is now Cross Keys and closed in 1921. The New Risca Colliery, which was between what is now Wattsville and Cross Keys, operated until 1967.

The Black Vein coal seam was very explosive and the mines working it experienced a series of serious mine accidents. In 1846, 35 miners were killed in an explosion at the Black Vein Colliery, and in 1860 more than 140 miners were killed at the same mine. In 1860, an explosion at the New Risca colliery, which was working the same seam of coal, killed 120 men.

Brickworks, quarries and copper, tin and iron works also developed in and around Risca through the nineteenth century.

Risca was served by the Monmouthshire Railway and Canal Company lines to the north from Tredegar (via the Sirhowy Railway) and Ebbw Vale towards Newport to the south, including passenger facilities at the original Risca railway station.

=== Twentieth century ===
The dominance of coal in the local economy meant that mine closures in the 1930s and 1940s caused severe unemployment in Risca. Some charitable relief was sent by the Mayor of Oxford's Mining Distress Committee. In 1931, this included - with the help of a grant from the Educational Settlements Association - the founding of the Educational Settlement at Oxford House, Risca. The first wardens of the settlement were a couple, Mr and Mrs Wills. David Wills was a UK pioneer of psychiatric social work, a holder of a William Straight Fellowship at the New York School of Social Work at Columbia University. Oxford House, Risca was founded at Hillside, moving in 1937 to The Grove. Oxford House is now an adult education centre operated by Caerphilly Borough Council.

By the end of the 1970s, most of the local coalmines had closed and the majority of the population were working in other industries.

The town is now part of the Cardiff Capital Region which has a combined population of 1,543,293.

== Governance ==
In the UK Parliament, Risca is part of the constituency of Newport West and Islwyn, a Labour Party stronghold represented since the 2024 general election by Ruth Jones. Don Touhig previously represented the constituency following a by-election in 1995, but did not stand for re-election in 2010. The seat and its predecessor was formerly represented for 25 years by the former Labour leader Neil Kinnock.

In the Senedd, Risca is part of the constituency of Islwyn, represented since 2003 by Labour's Irene James. At the first Assembly elections in 1999 Brian Hancock, Plaid Cymru, won the seat in a major upset and one of 17 seats in the National Assembly of Wales for Plaid Cymru. The constituency falls within the electoral region of South Wales East, whose four AMs are Conservatives Mohammad Asghar and William Graham, Plaid Cymru's Jocelyn Davies, and Liberal Democrat Veronica German.

== Notable landmarks and buildings ==
Twmbarlwm has the remains of an Iron Age hill fort near its summit, and this is believed to have been built by the Silures, the Celtic tribe that inhabited the area before and during Roman times.

The Welsh Oak, a pub on the outskirts of Pontymister, was the meeting place for the Chartists before they marched on Newport during the Newport Rising of 1839.

The local Church in Wales church is dedicated to St. Mary the Virgin . The St Mary and St Mercurius Coptic Orthodox Church in St Mary Street is a grade II listed building and is the first Coptic Orthodox Church in Wales. It was a former Wesleyan Methodist church, founded in 1837, rebuilt on the same site in 1852 and was dedicated to St John. The architect is unknown. The church was designed to seat 600 people. It was later known as "Trinity Methodist Church".

The park 'Tredegar Grounds' was donated to the people of Risca in 1897 by Godfrey Morgan, 1st Viscount Tredegar, to commemorate Queen Victoria’s Diamond Jubilee and in return the 'Jubilee' statue was erected by public subscription 'in recognition of Lord Tredegar's generosity to the neighbourhood.' A small bronze statuette of Samson, a bearded figure dressed in a loincloth, stands on a circular stone plinth on a square stepped base.

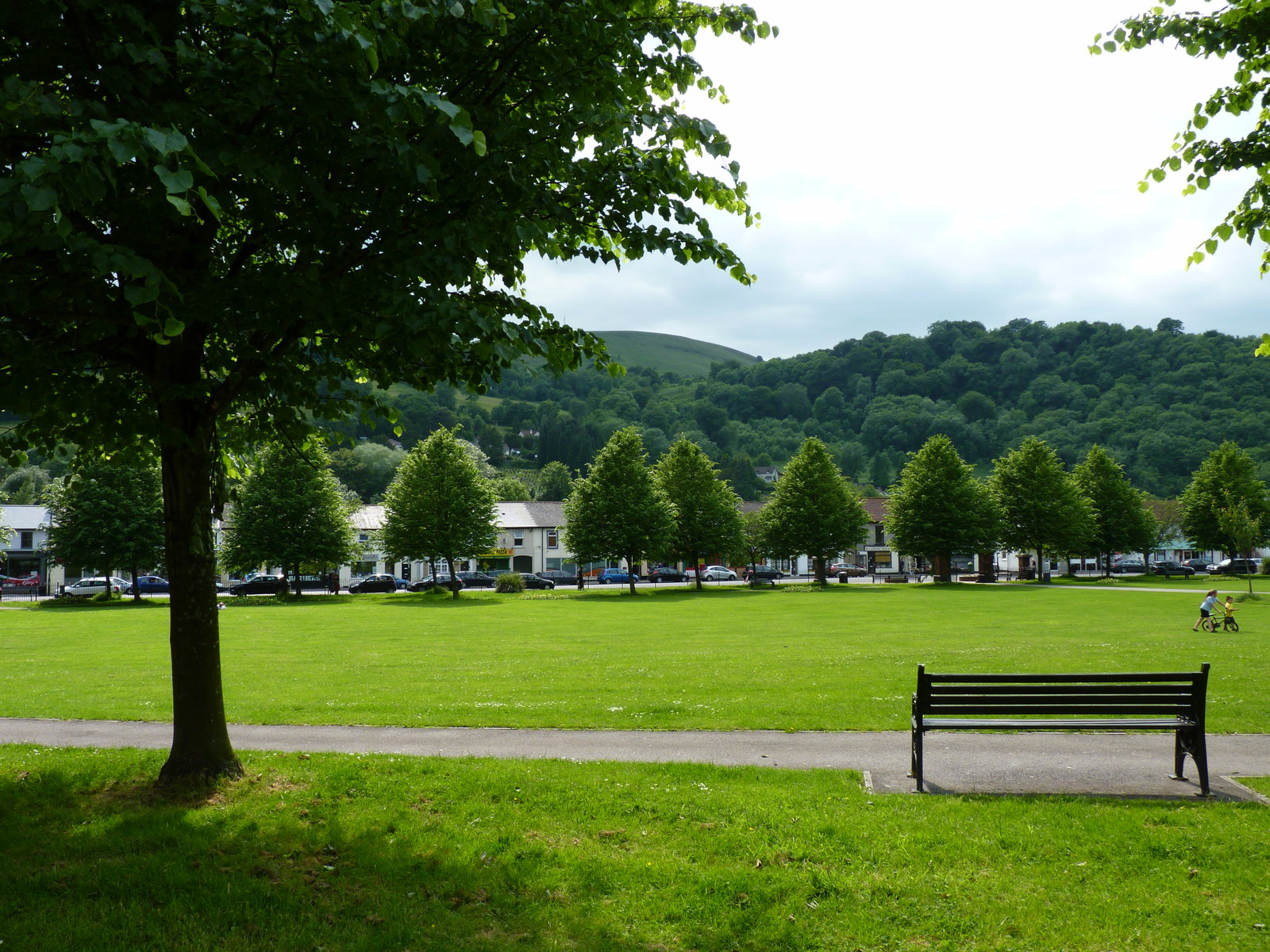
A view through Tredegar Park towards the main street of Risca

Risca and Pontymister railway station is served by trains between Ebbw Vale Town and either Cardiff Central or Newport. The Monmouthshire Canal passes through the town.

== Education and culture ==
The town currently has four schools: Risca Primary School, Ty-Sign Primary School, Ty Isaf Infants School and Risca Community Comprehensive School. Risca Community Comprehensive School is the only secondary school in Risca and was opened by Elizabeth II in 1977. It is located on the same site as the town's leisure centre and has approximately 1000 pupils.

Risca also has an award-winning male voice choir. Founded in 1970, Risca Male Choir won the award at the 2024 National Eisteddfod of Wales in Pontypridd and is conducted by Matthew Harrison.

== Sport and leisure ==
Risca United F.C. play in the Cymru South and are managed by Simon Berry. The club used to play their home games at Ty-Isaf Park.

Risca RFC (The Cuckoos) play in the Welsh Rugby Union Division 1 East, at Stores Field, Risca. An active mini-rugby & junior section with age groups from 6 to 16, provide a steady stream of players, some of them having progressed to the early stages of professional rugby with the Newport Gwent Dragons.

There are some extensive mountain bike trails on the wooded hills just to the north of the town, at Cwmcarn, which are receiving increasing popularity.

== Notable people ==
See Category:People from Risca

- Sprint athlete Jamie Baulch was raised in Risca before going on to compete for his country at the Olympic Games, Commonwealth Games and various other Championships.
- Harold Edwards (rugby league) (1909–1993), Welsh rugby league footballer
