= Waun-Lwyd =

Village in Blaenau Gwent, Wales

Coordinates: 51.7558°N 3.1933°W

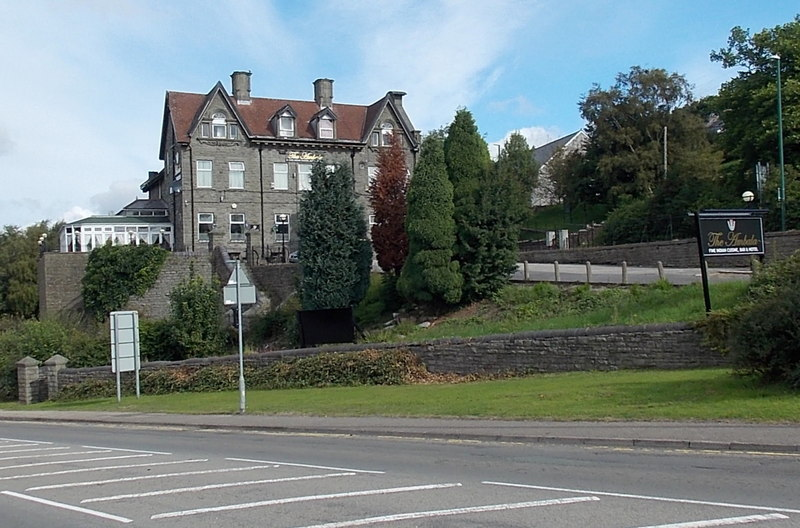
- The former Park Hotel on Station Road, Waunlwyd

- Location within Blaenau Gwent
- Population: 1,556 (2011)
- OS grid reference: SO177069
- Community: Cwm
- Principal area: Blaenau Gwent
- Preserved county: Blaenau Gwent
- Country: Wales
- Sovereign state: United Kingdom
- Post town: EBBW VALE
- Postcode district: NP23
- Dialling code: 01495
- Police: Gwent
- Fire: South Wales
- Ambulance: Welsh
- UK Parliament: Blaenau Gwent and Rhymney
- Senedd Cymru – Welsh Parliament: Blaenau Gwent

Waun-Lwyd or Waunlwyd is a village in the Ebbw Valley in Blaenau Gwent. It belongs in the community of Cwm.

It is located 1.67 miles (2.69 km) south of Ebbw Vale and 14.5 miles (23.3 km) north of Newport. The A4046 runs through the village. The population of the community is 1,556.

== History ==
The Gwent Heritage voluntary group have extensively documented the history of the village as far back as its initial mining establishment. The Cwm and Waunlwyd branch of the group meets regularly to contribute to the collection of material about the region.

The River Ebbw flows past the west of the village. To the east is Mynydd Carn-y-cefn (550m).

== Village today ==
Facilities in Waun-Lwyd include a public phone box, the Caersalem United Reformed Church (since 2018 a Baptist church), an Off Licence shop, a hair and beauty store, and a Smiling Valley Chinese restaurant. Waunlwyd Methodist Chapel is a noted post medieval chapel building but its location has been unclear since 2002.

The town had an NHS Wales branch surgery until closure in 2014.

Until 2013 Waunlwyd Primary School was based in the village, and was redeveloped in 2009, but has since closed.

11% of the population can communicate in Welsh. 72% of the resident population was born in Wales, while 20.8% were born in England. The village is considerably less ethnically diverse than the UK average, with a 99% white population versus 89% nationally. 62.3% of residents were employed either full, part time, or self-employed.

It has a local football team, Waunlwyd F.C. established in 2023. The nearest rugby side is R.T.B. Ebbw Vale RFC.

The village is near to Festival Park, the home of the 1992 Ebbw Vale Garden Festival and now a shopping centre. Owners GWM Capital purchased the site in 2019 and state they are redeveloping the site to become an activity and retail hub.

== Transport ==
The village is a 9-minute walk, and 9 miles (14 km) from Ebbw Vale Parkway railway station.

It is served by the A4046 Park View Street bus stop, which is on the route to and from Ebbw Vale.

List of destinations
| Operator | Number | Origin | Stop | Destination | Journey time | Frequency |
|---|---|---|---|---|---|---|
| Stagecoach South Wales | E3 | Ebbw Vale bus station | Park View Street, Waunlwyd | Brynmawr via Cwm | 43 minutes | Hourly |
| Stagecoach South Wales | E3 | Brynmawr via Cwm | Park View Street, Waunlwyd | Ebbw Vale bus station | 24 minutes | Hourly |
| Stagecoach South Wales | 62 | Ebbw Vale bus station | Park View Street, Waunlwyd | Cwmbran bus station | 41 minutes | Daily |
| Stagecoach South Wales | 62 | Cwmbran bus station | Park View Street, Waunlwyd | Ebbw Vale bus station | 45 minutes | Daily |
| Stagecoach South Wales | 98 | Ebbw Vale bus station | Park View Street, Waunlwyd | Abertillery | 16 minutes | Twice daily |
| Stagecoach South Wales | 98 | Abertillery | Park View Street, Waunlwyd | Ebbw Vale bus station | 24 minutes | Daily |

== Governance ==
The Cwm & Waunlwyd electoral ward serves the village. The ward is represented by Councillor Derrick Bevan on Blaenau Gwent County Borough Council.

The area is represented in the Senedd by Alun Davies (Labour) and the Member of Parliament is Nick Smith (Labour).
