= Risca railway station =

Former railway station in Wales

General information
- Location: Risca; Wales
- Coordinates: 51.6089°N 3.0998°W
- Grid reference: ST239905
- Platforms: 4

Other information
- Status: Disused

History
- Original company: Monmouthshire Railway and Canal Company
- Pre-grouping: Monmouthshire Railway and Canal Company
- Post-grouping: Great Western Railway

Key dates
- 23 December 1850: Opened
- 30 April 1962: Closed
- 6 February 2008: Reopened as Risca and Pontymister
Location

Risca railway station was a station on the Monmouthshire Railway and Canal Company Western Valley line, later the Great Western Railway. It was located at Station Place, just south of the junction where the line split left towards Nine Mile Point (and eventually Tredegar) and right towards Ebbw Vale. It served the town of Risca.

== History ==
The Monmouthshire Railway and Canal Company (MRCC) had been running the canals and horse-drawn carriages on their tram-roads which went through Risca from 1795. After 1802 the MRCC built a tramway from Nine Mile Point, west of Risca, to Newport, and an associated company, the Sirhowy Tramroad, connected there from Tredegar.

The first steam locomotive passenger train ran on the MRCC Western Valley line on Monday 23 December 1850, with service running twice in each direction (to Ebbw Vale and to Newport) each weekday.

The station was expanded to 4 through lines and platforms in June 1910 as traffic grew.

Passenger services on the line ended in 1962.

Goods services from Tredegar Junction to Risca Junction closed on 4 May 1970.

== Viaduct ==
Risca Long Bridge was a fine masonry viaduct with thirty-two arches that was built in 1805 to carry the tramroad across the Ebbw Valley flood plain. It was constructed from red pennant sandstone by the engineer of the Sirhowy Tramroad, John Hodgkinson. The bridge was redundant by 1859 and was demolished in 1902. Local houses have been built from its stone and the east abutment is the only remaining fragment. The viaduct was 48 ft high (14.6m) and had 32 arches. It was designed so that housing could be constructed below the arches.

== Present day ==
A new station named Risca and Pontymister was opened on 6 February 2008 as part of the reopened Ebbw Valley Railway. It is located roughly ½ mile south east of the original Risca railway station.

Station Road, Station Place and the Railway Tavern are clues to the site which remain to this day. The station house and goods shed buildings remain adjacent to the line.

== Route ==
Preceding station	Disused railways	Following station
Ebbw Vale	Monmouthshire Railway and Canal Company; Ebbw Valley Railway	Tynycwm Halt
Nine Mile Point	Monmouthshire Railway and Canal Company to Sirhowy Railway	Tynycwm Halt
