= Graham Powell =

Wales international rugby union player

- Born: 17 November 1932 Waun-Lwyd, Wales
- Died: 21 December 2012 (aged 80) Beckenham, England
- School: Ebbw Vale Grammar School
- University: University of Bristol
- Occupation: Oil executive

Rugby union career
- Position: Centre
International career
Years	Team	Apps	(Points)
1957	Wales	2	(0)

Graham Powell (17 November 1932 — 21 December 2012) was a Welsh international rugby union player.

Powell was born in Waun-Lwyd and attended Ebbw Vale Grammar School. He was a good enough footballer in his youth to make Welsh Schools trials and also competed in athletics, earning Victor ludorum honours at the University of Bristol.

An England Universities representative, Powell won two Wales caps 1957 Five Nations, appearing in matches against Ireland at home and France in Paris. He came into the team after Wales had lost their opening two fixtures and formed a new centre combination with Cyril Davies, to become the first Ebbw Vale player to be capped for Wales.

Powell, who worked in the oil industry, became captain of Eddw Vale in the 1957/58 season and led the combined Abertillery & Ebbw Vale team that won a tour match against the visiting 1957–58 Wallabies side at Abertillery.

== See also ==
- List of Wales national rugby union players
