= Newbridge railway station (Wales) =

Railway station in Caerphilly, Wales

Newbridge Welsh: Trecelyn
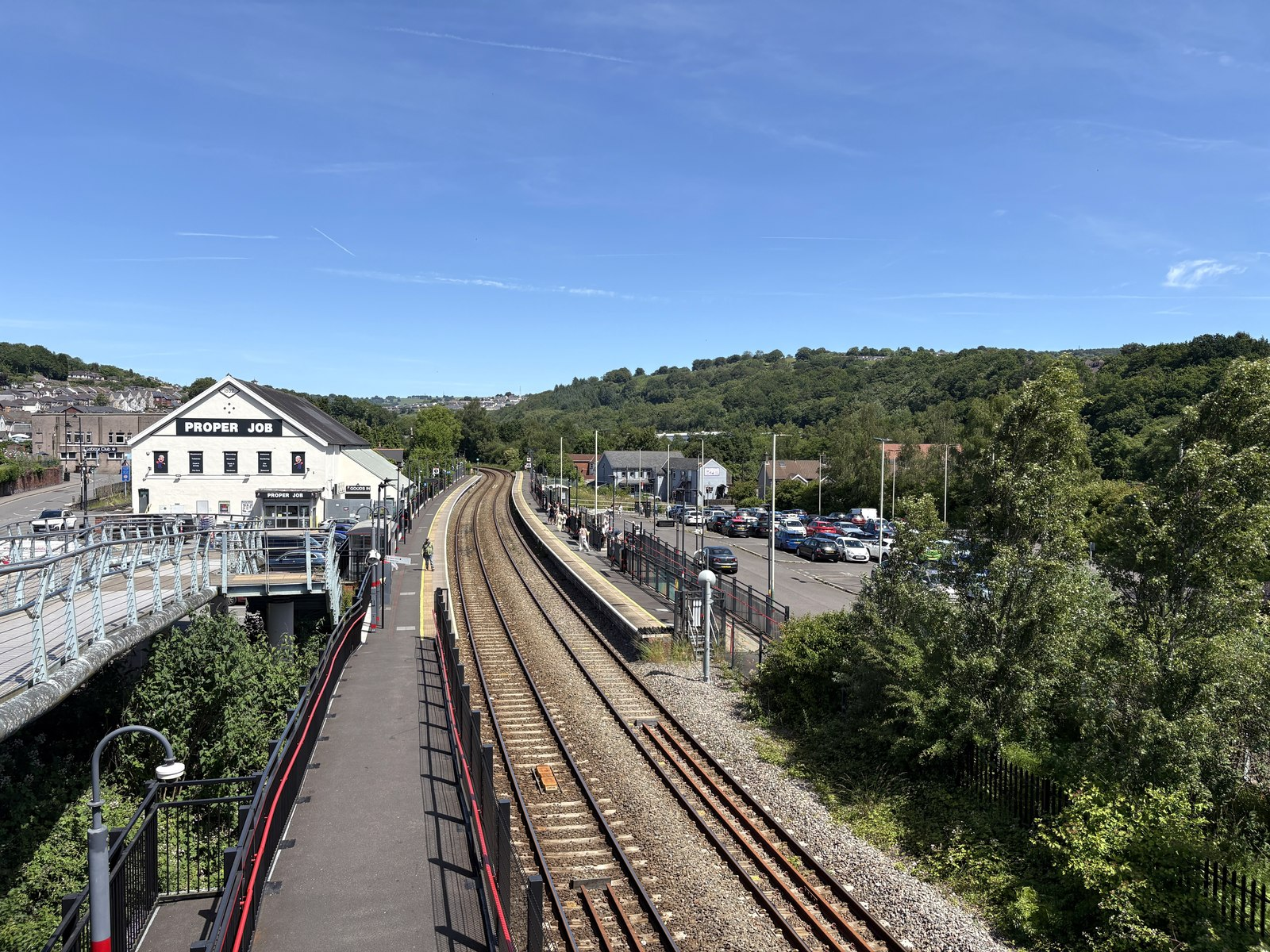
- Newbridge railway station in June 2026

General information
- Location: Newbridge, Caerphilly; Wales
- Coordinates: 51°39′56.91″N 3°8′34.13″W
- Grid reference: ST210969
- Owner: Network Rail
- Manager: Transport for Wales
- Platforms: 2

Other information
- Station code: NBE
- Classification: DfT category F2

Key dates
- 23 December 1850: Opened
- 30 April 1962: Closed to passengers
- 7 April 1969: Closed to goods
- 6 February 2008: Reopened

Passengers
- 2020/21: ▼36,694
- 2021/22: ▲85,036
- 2022/23: ▲0.109 million
- 2023/24: ▼0.106 million
- 2024/25: ▲0.153 million
Location
Notes
- Passenger statistics from the Office of Rail and Road

Newbridge railway station (Welsh: Trecelyn) is on the Ebbw Valley Railway and serves the towns of Newbridge and Blackwood in south east Wales. The current station is on the site of the former station and coal yard in the town centre opposite the former Co-op Food store and existing council car park. The station car park and access to platform 2 is off a signalised junction on Bridge Street, with pedestrian access to platform 1 via Celynen Road.

== History ==
=== Original station ===
The original station was opened by the Monmouthshire Railway and Canal Company on 23 December 1850, and closed to passengers on 30 April 1962 and to goods on 7 April 1969. It had 2 platforms.

=== Station reopened ===
The station and line reopened on 6 February 2008 when services between Cardiff Central and Ebbw Vale Parkway railway station commenced. In February 2009 Caerphilly County Borough Council started construction on a footbridge to link the station with the Comprehensive School, Leisure Centre and the town centre.

=== Second platform added ===
To accommodate an hourly train from Ebbw Vale Town to Newport a passing loop and second platform have been built at Newbridge and Llanhilleth, opening on 4 December 2023.

== Services ==
A half-hourly service operates in both directions on weekdays (southbound destinations alternate between Cardiff and Newport) and Saturdays with a two-hourly Sunday service.

| Preceding station | National Rail | Following station |
|---|---|---|
| Llanhilleth | Transport for Wales; Cardiff Central - Ebbw Vale Town | Crosskeys |
| | Historical railways | |
| Crumlin Low Level; Line open, station closed | Great Western Railway; Monmouthshire Railway and Canal Company | Celynen South Halt; Line open, station closed |
