= Crosskeys College =

Further education college in Wales

Coordinates: 51°37′6″N 3°7′23″W

Coleg Gwent - Crosskeys (generally known as Crosskeys College) is the largest campus of Coleg Gwent. It is located next to Risca Road in Crosskeys, near Newport in Wales. The college was previously a technical college and a coal mining college. However, since the demise of heavy industry in the area over the past decades, the college has now become the leading further education establishment in the area.

Many of the secondary schools in the area are without a sixth-form and so they feed Crosskeys college with students. The majority of students in Crosskeys are studying AS & A2 levels, of which there are over 30 to choose from. There are also BTECs, National Diplomas, GNVQs and GCSEs that are available to study. It boasts a 100% pass rate on the vast majority of its courses.

The main feeder schools for post-GCSE leavers are:

- Newbridge Comprehensive School
- Blackwood Comprehensive School
- Pontllanfraith Comprehensive School
- Oakdale Comprehensive School
- Risca Community Comprehensive School

There are however a number of students from Abertillery Comprehensive School, as well as a large, growing number of students from the Ebbw Vale and Newport secondary schools, this includes Caerleon.
