= Harold Edwards (rugby league) =

Wales international rugby league footballer

Personal information
- Full name: Harold George Edwards
- Born: 7 September 1909 Risca, Caerphilly County Borough, Wales
- Died: 1993 (aged 83–84)

Playing information
- Position: Prop
Club
Years	Team	Pld	T	G	FG	P
1933–37	Wigan	144	8			24
1937–40	Bradford Northern
	Total	144	8	0	0	24
Representative
Years	Team	Pld	T	G	FG	P
1935–38	Wales	2

Harold Edwards (7 September 1909 – 1993), also known by the nickname of "The Welsh Bull", was a Welsh professional rugby league footballer who played in the 1930s and 1940s. He played at representative level for Wales, and at club level for Wigan and Bradford Northern, as a prop.

== Background ==
Harold Edwards as born in Risca, Wales, and he died aged c. 83–84.

== Playing career ==
=== International honours ===
Edwards won 2 caps for Wales in 1935–1938 while at Wigan, and Bradford Northern.

=== Championship final appearances ===
Edwards played at prop in Wigan's 15–3 victory over Salford in the Championship Final during the 1933–34 season at Wilderspool Stadium, Warrington on Saturday 28 April 1934.

=== Notable tour matches ===
Edwards played at prop in Wigan's 30–27 victory over France at Central Park, Wigan, on Saturday 10 March 1934.
