= Mynydd Carn-y-cefn =

Coordinates: 51.7691°N 3.1794°W

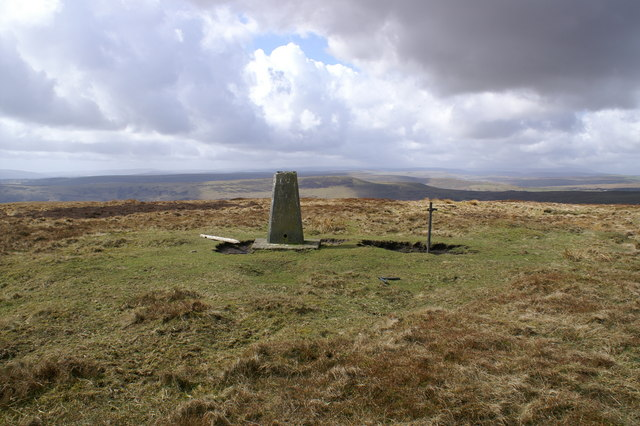
Mynydd Carn-y-cefn. Summit trigpoint looking west

Mynydd Carn-y-cefn (grid reference SO1808) is the name given to the broad ridge of high ground between the Ebbw Vale and the valley of the Ebbw Fach in the Valleys region of South Wales. It lies within the county borough of Blaenau Gwent, formerly Monmouthshire.

The broad-topped ridge runs NNW-SSE and achieves a summit height of 550 metres (1,800 ft) at a point crowned by a trig point at OS grid ref SO 187084 between Ebbw Vale and Blaina. It is a Marilyn with a prominence of 176 metres.

== Geology ==
The entire hill is composed of sandstones and mudstones dating from the Carboniferous Period. There are also numerous coal seams within the sequence, most of which have been worked. The upper part of the hill including the summit plateau is formed from the Pennant Sandstone, a rock assigned to the Carboniferous Upper Coal Measures. The flanks of the hill owe their steepness in part to the action of glacial ice during the succession of ice ages.

There are also 3 other hills surrounding Mynydd Carn-y-Cefn which are Coity Mountain and Mulfran. You can also see Pen y Fan from the summit. There are numerous landslips on the flanks of the ridge, notably above Blaina.

== Access ==
A minor public road runs along the western edge of the plateau. Most of the ridge has been mapped as open country under the CRoW Act thus giving a right of access to walkers. There are a number of public footpaths and other public rights of way across and along the ridge.
