= Ebbw Vale bus station =

Bus terminus and interchange in Ebbw Vale, Wales

Ebbw Vale bus station Gorsaf bws Glyn Ebwy
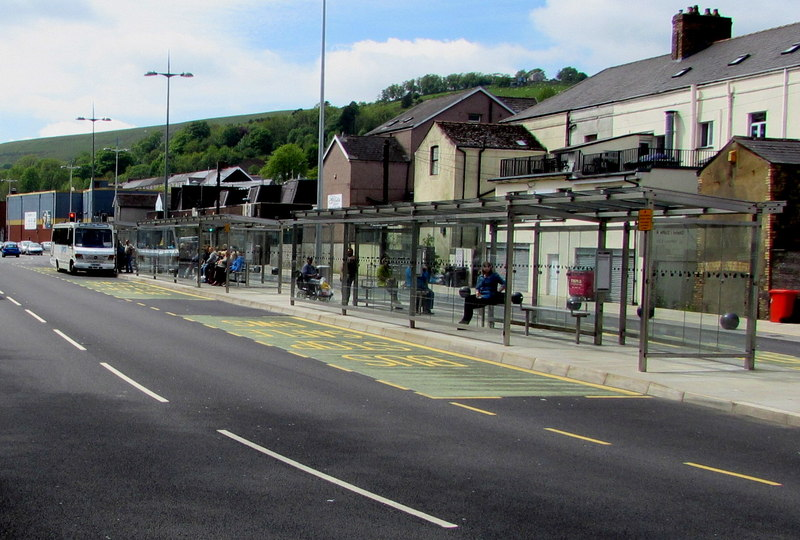
- Ebbw Vale bus station stands

General information
- Location: Inner Bypass; Ebbw Vale; NP23 6HL; Blaenau Gwent; Wales
- Coordinates: 51.77993°N 3.20675°W
- System: Bus station
- Owner: Blaenau Gwent Council
- Operator: Blaenau Gwent Council
- Bus routes: 8
- Bus stands: 6
- Bus operators: Stagecoach in South Wales; Phil Anslow Travel
- Connections: Ebbw Vale Town railway station

Construction
- Structure type: Shelter
- Parking: None
- Cycle facilities: Racks
- Accessible: Level boarding

Other information
- Station code: blgapmt
- Website: traveline.info stagecoachbus.com
Location

Ebbw Vale bus station (Welsh: Gorsaf bws Glyn Ebwy), also known as Inner Bypass, is a bus terminus located in the town centre of Ebbw Vale, South Wales.

== Background ==
Ebbw Vale is a town at the head of the Ebbw Valley, 2.5 miles (4.0 km) from the south of the Brecon Beacons National Park. As such the town is the northern terminus of services through the valley towards Cardiff, Caerphilly, and Cwmbran, as well as having services to Tredegar and Abergavenny.

The bus interchange is approximately 0.279 miles (0.449 km) from Ebbw Vale Town railway station which provides services to Cardiff Central railway station and Newport railway station.

In 2019 residents in the nearby area complained at cuts to bus services by operator Stagecoach South Wales which had left them "like prisoners in their own village". The town of Cwm has been reduced to one bus each hour on weekdays, and no services on Sunday. The town's evening services are already subsidised by Blaenau Gwent County Borough Council who state they are unable to further subsidise services to towns on the route.

== Layout ==
The sits on an island in the centre of the A4046 through the town, and faces the line of retail businesses along the road. As such it is referred to on maps as "Inner Bypass" station.

The station has six bus stands, identified as numbers 1-5.

== Destinations ==
Ebbw Vale is the terminus for a number of Stagecoach services, and serves as an interchange for travellers headed to Tredegar and Abergavenny.

List of destinations
Operator	Number	Origin	Stand	Destination	Journey time	Frequency
Stagecoach South Wales	E2	Ebbw Vale	Stop 1	Mountain Air Gate	9 minutes	Every 20 minutes
Stagecoach South Wales	E2	Mountain Air Gate	Stop 6	Ebbw Vale	9 minutes	Every 20 minutes
Stagecoach South Wales	E3	Ebbw Vale	Stop 2	Brynmawr via Cwm	63 minutes	Hourly
Stagecoach South Wales	E3	Brynmawr	Stop 2	Ebbw Vale via Cwm	63 minutes	Hourly
Stagecoach South Wales	E4	Ebbw Vale	Stop 5	Garn Lydan	14 minutes	Every 30 minutes
Stagecoach South Wales	E4	Garn Lydan	Stop 2	Ebbw Vale	15 minutes	Every 30 minutes
Stagecoach South Wales	X4	Ebbw Vale	Stop 6	Cardiff via Tredegar and Ashvale	97 minutes	Every 30 minutes
Stagecoach South Wales	X4	Cardiff via Tredegar and Ashvale	Stop 3	Ebbw Vale	96 minutes	Every 30 minutes
Phil Anslow Coaches	E11	Ebbw Vale	Stop 3	Tredegar	25 minutes	Hourly
Phil Anslow Coaches	E11	Tredegar	Stop 3	Ebbw Vale	25 minutes	Hourly
Stagecoach South Wales	X4	Abergavenny	Stop 3	Ebbw Vale via Brynmawr	72 minutes	Every 2 hours
Stagecoach South Wales	X4	Ebbw Vale	Stop 3	Abergavenny via Brynmawr	72 minutes	Every 2 hours
Stagecoach South Wales	97	Peacehaven Court, Tredegar	Stop 4	Ebbw Vale	15 minutes	Two daily
Stagecoach South Wales	97	Ebbw Vale	Stop 2	Peacehaven Court, Tredegar	15 minutes	Two daily

== Railway station ==
Ebbw Vale Town railway station provides rail transport to destinations on the Ebbw Valley railway line, which include Cardiff Central, Newport, and infrequent services to Bridgend.

The station is an eight-minute walk from the bus station. The town has a large number of car parking facilities near to the station.

== See also ==
- List of bus stations in Wales
- Transport in Wales
