= Rogerstone railway station =

Railway station in Newport, Wales

Rogerstone Welsh: Tŷ Du
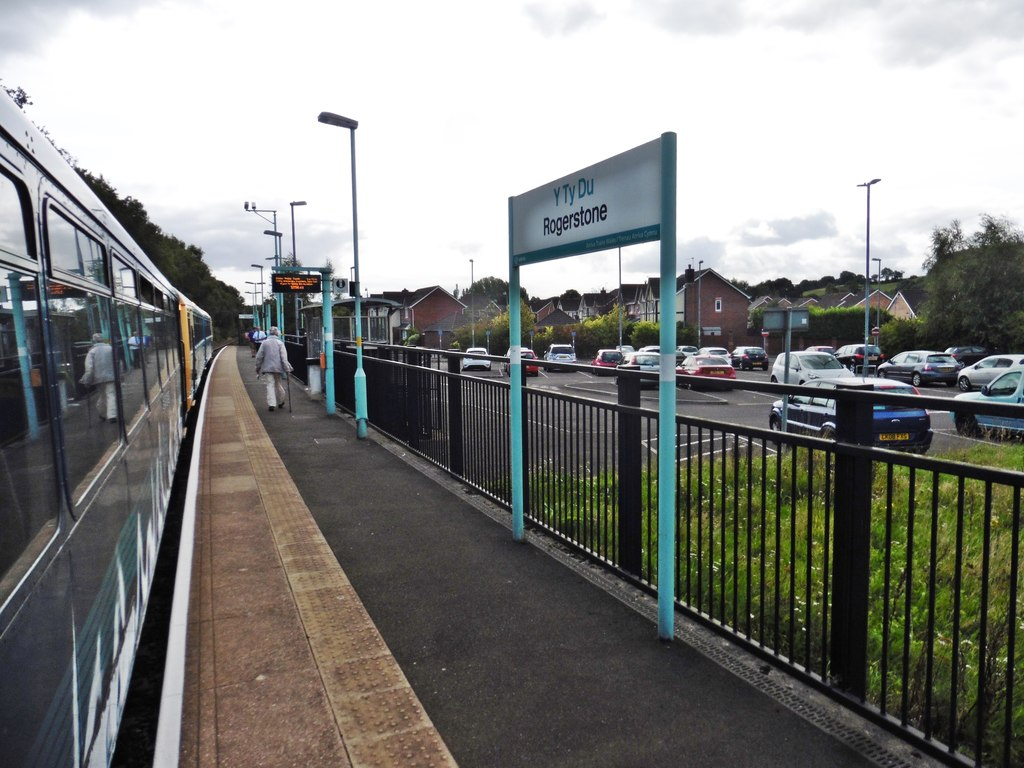

General information
- Location: Rogerstone, Newport; Wales
- Coordinates: 51.596°N 3.067°W
- Grid reference: ST262890
- Owner: Network Rail
- Manager: Transport for Wales
- Platforms: 1

Other information
- Station code: ROR
- Classification: DfT category F2

Key dates
- August 1851: Opened as Tydee
- 1898: renamed Rogerstone
- 30 April 1962: Closed
- 6 February 2008: Reopened as Rogerstone

Passengers
- 2020/21: ▼14,924
- 2021/22: ▲55,242
- 2022/23: ▲70,426
- 2023/24: ▼62,568
- 2024/25: ▲87,268
Location
Notes
- Passenger statistics from the Office of Rail and Road

Rogerstone railway station (Welsh: Tŷ-du) is a station on the Ebbw Valley Railway in the community of Rogerstone in Newport, south Wales. The station is situated ½ mile north of the original station on the site of former rail sidings. The station is within the Afon Village housing development. Access to the single-platform station and associated car park is off Lily Way.

The station opened on 6 February 2008 when services between Cardiff Central and Ebbw Vale Parkway commenced, with trains being operated by Arriva Trains Wales. On 17 May 2015, a new northern terminus was opened at Ebbw Vale Town railway station. In 2018, Transport for Wales took over running of the services. On 13 December 2021, a direct service to Newport railway station was added, suspended in January 2022 because of staff shortages caused by the COVID-19 pandemic and reinstated in May 2022.

== Services ==
On Mondays to Saturdays, there are two trains per hour between Cardiff Central or Newport and Ebbw Vale Town. On Sundays, the Cardiff to Ebbw Vale service runs via Newport every two hours.

The journey time to Newport is 14 minutes, Cardiff Central is 25 to 30 minutes, and it is around 35 minutes to Ebbw Vale.

A subsidised rail linc bus operated between the station and Newport city centre via Celtic Springs, Cleppa Park, Tredegar Park and the Royal Gwent Hospital, from the reopening of the Ebbw Valley Railway, but was withdrawn in May 2008 due to low usage. In November 2011, the Welsh Government announced that it would be reinstated on a trial basis for a year.

Preceding station	National Rail	Following station
Risca and Pontymister	Transport for Wales; Ebbw Vale Town - Cardiff / Newport	Pye Corner

== See also ==
- Railway stations in Newport
