= Risca Community Comprehensive School =

Coordinates: 51.6062°N 3.0710°W

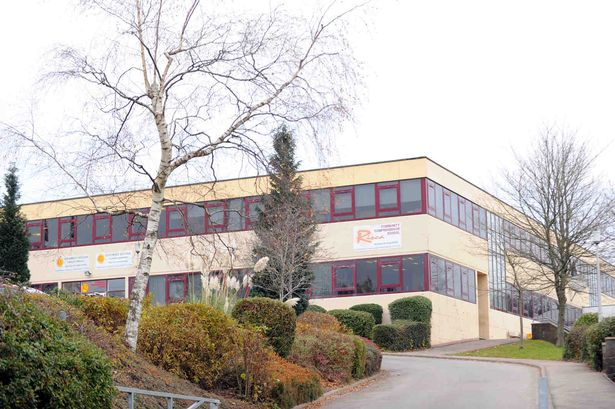
- Risca Community comprehensive school
- Caerphilly; Wales

Information
- Motto: 'Your community, your school...making the difference'
- Local authority: Caerphilly County Borough Council
- Headteacher: Martin Hulland
- Age: 11 to 16
- Colours: Maroon, grey/black
- Website: https://sites.google.com/riscacom.net/rccs-virtual-school/home

Risca Community Comprehensive School is a community comprehensive school located in the town of Risca near Newport on the eastern side of the Caerphilly County Borough, South Wales. The school was opened by Queen Elizabeth II in 1977. There are approximately 900 pupils at the school aged from 11 to 16 (School years 7–11).
