= Crosskeys =

Crosskeys: Welsh: Pont-y-cymer
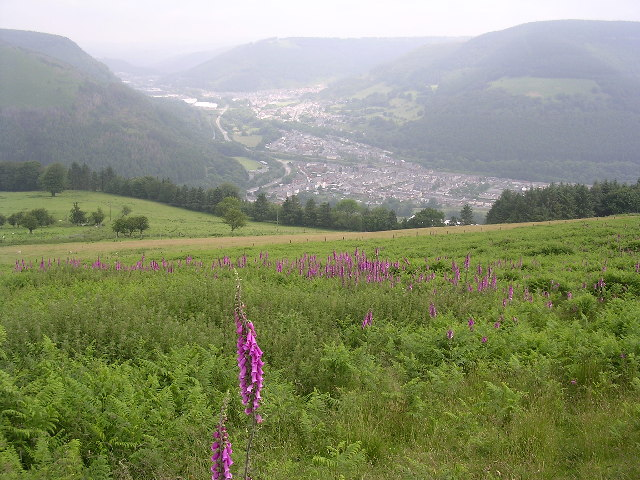

- Location within Caerphilly
- Population: 3,265 (2011))
- OS grid reference: ST225915
- Principal area: Caerphilly
- Preserved county: Gwent
- Country: Wales
- Sovereign state: United Kingdom
- Post town: NEWPORT
- Postcode district: NP11
- Dialling code: 01495 27
- Police: Gwent
- Fire: South Wales
- Ambulance: Welsh
- UK Parliament: Newport West and Islwyn
- Senedd Cymru – Welsh Parliament: Islwyn
- List of places UK Wales Caerphilly 51.6169°N 3.1207°W Map of the community

Crosskeys (Welsh: Pont-y-cymer) is a village, community and an electoral ward in Caerphilly county borough in Wales.

== Etymology ==
The village was originally named Pont-y-cymer and this remains the official Welsh name for the village. The name means bridge at the confluence of rivers, and suggests the area was known as a place to bridge the confluence of the Ebbw and the Sirhowy rivers, long before its urban development in the nineteenth century.

The English name is taken from the Cross Keys Inn (Renamed as the Cross Keys Hotel). (Since renamed as 'The Solar Strand') The English name appears as Crosskeys on Ordnance Survey maps, and the railway station also uses this spelling. However, many local organisations use the two-word spelling, as does Cross Keys RFC.

== History ==
Crosskeys is a South Wales Valleys community, within the historic boundaries of Monmouthshire, once part of the coal mining community of the South Wales coalfield and originally developed as part of Risca from the 1830s to serve the local mines - first the Black Vein and later the New Risca pits, both of which had large explosions during the later part of the 19th century.

The village has a railway station on the Ebbw Vale Line.

The junction between the main Ebbw Vale and Tredegar roads is called Pennyless Corner as it was a meeting place for unemployed men during the great depression of the 1920s.

== Amenities ==
It is now a quiet area complete with a residents' society. It has a large park in the lower part and listed buildings in neighbouring Pontywaun, which is normally considered as part of Crosskeys.

Local children attend Waunfawr Primary School which celebrated its 125th anniversary in 2023. Many of the secondary school pupils attended nearby Cwmcarn High School, until it closed in 2018. It is also home to Coleg Gwent's Crosskeys Campus.

Additionally, it has a local rugby union team, Cross Keys RFC, and consequently many different age-banded teams such as youth and mini rugby.

Crosskeys is close to the Cwmcarn Forest Drive which has extensive mountain-biking trails. There is a large local park toward the lower part of the village. The park is home to the local cricket club, again with age-banded youth teams as well as the men's team. There is also a park and a multiple-sports facility.

Sirhowy Valley Country Park is also easily accessible from Crosskeys. It is a base for walking or cycling with access to Flatwoods Meadows Local Nature Reserve. There are also mountain bike trails, a traditional working hill farm that is open to school visits, and a small farm trail. Nearby Craig Coch is an ancient mixed woodland.
