= Risca and Pontymister railway station =

Railway station in Caerphilly, Wales

Risca and Pontymister Welsh: Rhisga a Phont-y-meistr
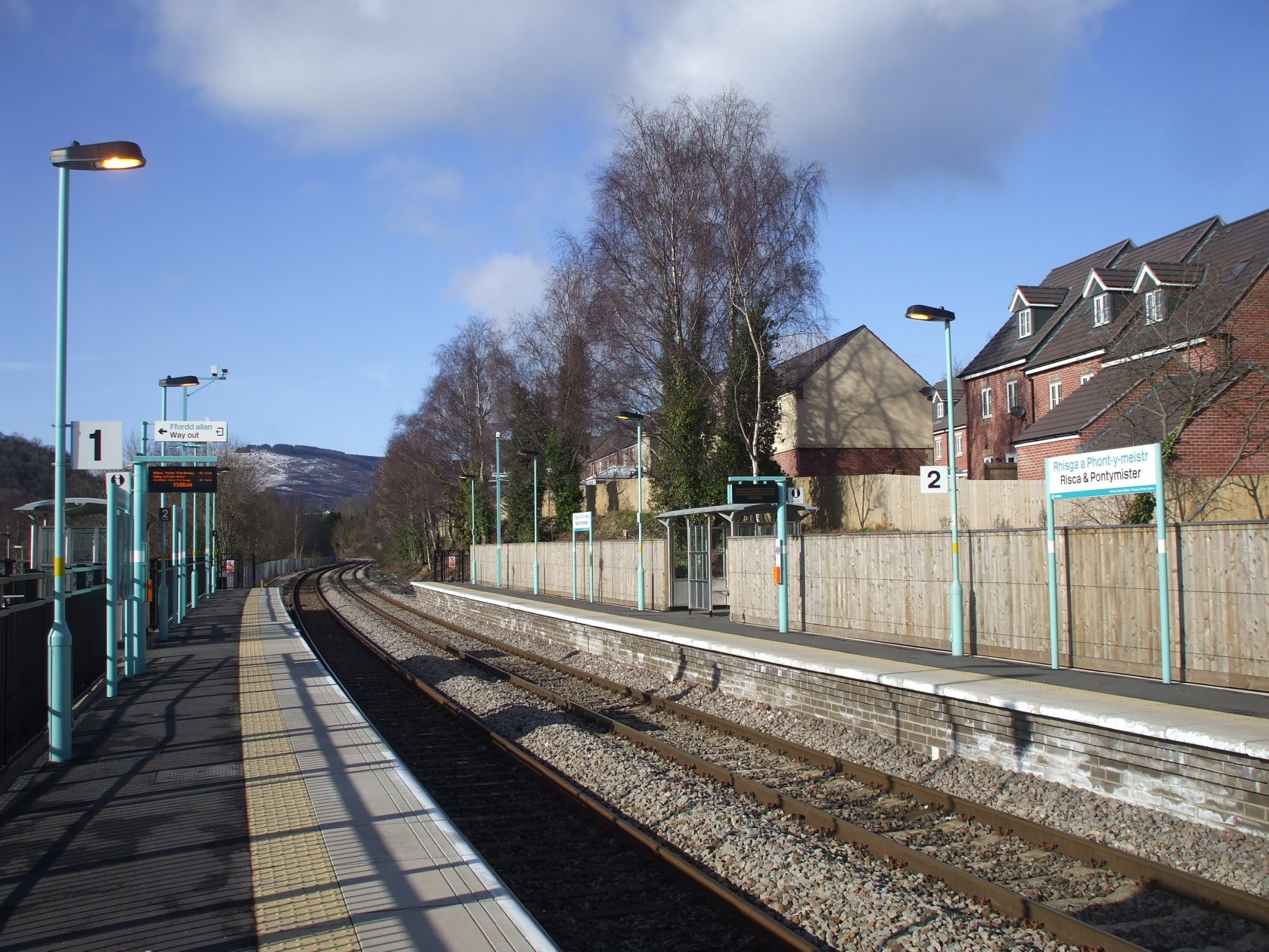

General information
- Location: Pontymister, Caerphilly; Wales
- Coordinates: 51.60554°N 3.09304°W
- Grid reference: ST245902
- Owner: Network Rail
- Manager: Transport for Wales
- Platforms: 2

Other information
- Station code: RCA
- Classification: DfT category F2

Key dates
- 23 December 1850: Opened as Risca
- 30 April 1962: Closed
- 6 February 2008: Reopened as Risca and Pontymister

Passengers
- 2020/21: ▼16,906
- 2021/22: ▲55,560
- 2022/23: ▲72,414
- 2023/24: ▼67,702
- 2024/25: ▲95,416
Location
Notes
- Passenger statistics from the Office of Rail and Road

Risca and Pontymister railway station (Welsh: Rhisga a Phont-y-meistr) is a station on the Ebbw Valley Railway in south-east Wales. It serves the village of Pontymister and the town of Risca. It is located roughly ½ mile south of the original Risca railway station.

The station is located near Ty Isaf School and Mill Street on a site of former railway sidings. The station has two platforms and a park and ride car park. Vehicular access to the station is off Maryland Road, with passenger access off Mill Street.

== Services ==
On Mondays to Saturdays, there are two trains per hour between Cardiff Central or Newport and Ebbw Vale Town. On Sundays, the Cardiff to Ebbw Vale service runs via Newport every two hours.

Preceding station	National Rail	Following station
Crosskeys	Transport for Wales; Cardiff / Newport - Ebbw Vale Town	Rogerstone

== History ==
The first steam locomotive passenger train ran on the Monmouthshire Railway and Canal Company Western Valley line on Monday 23 December 1850, with service running twice in each direction (to Ebbw Vale and to Newport) each weekday.

The MRCC had been running the canals and horse-drawn carriages on their tram-roads which went through Risca from 1795.

Passenger services on the original line ended in 1962.
