= Pye Corner railway station =

Railway station in Newport, Wales

Pye Corner
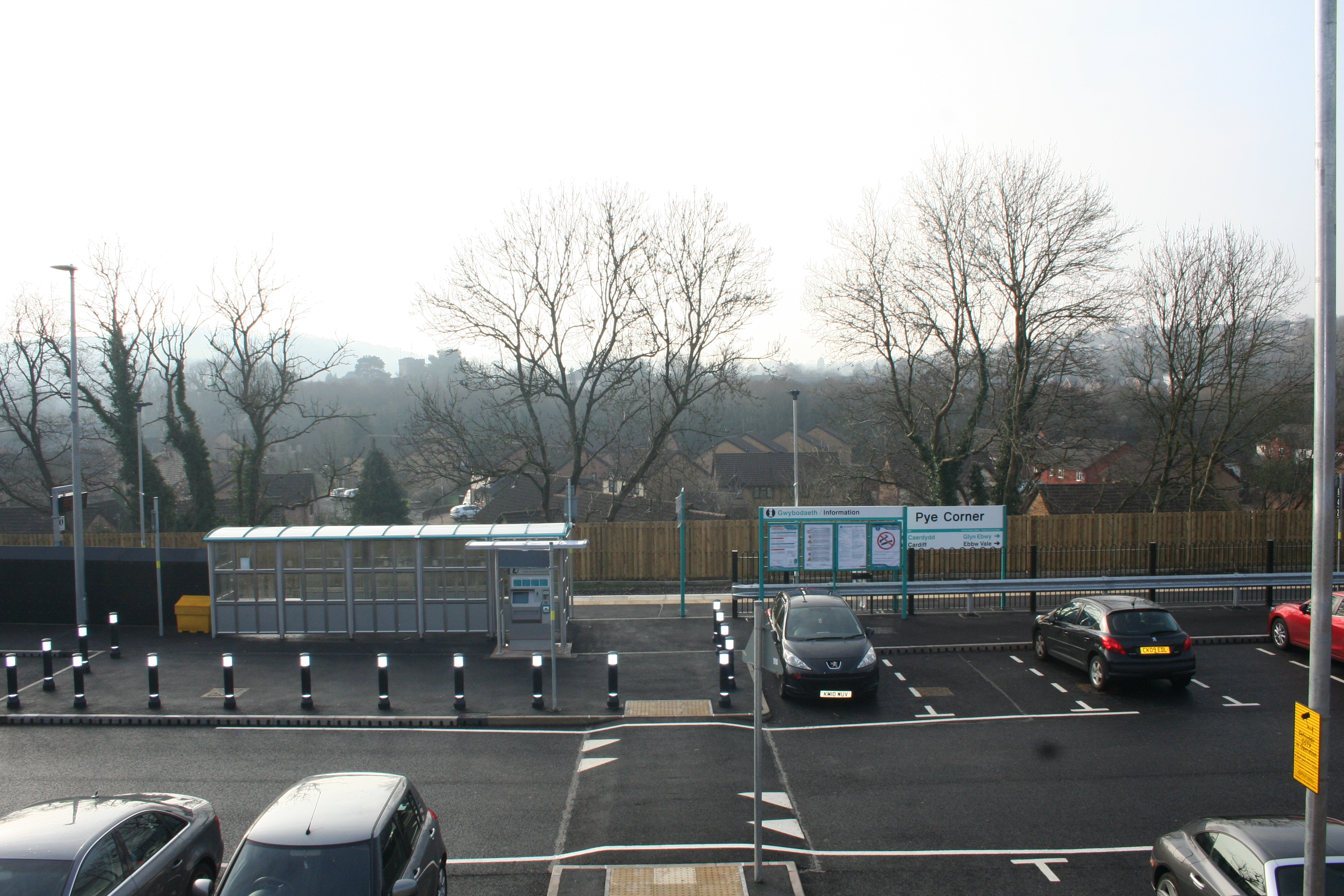

General information
- Location: Bassaleg, Newport; Wales
- Coordinates: 51.5813°N 3.04125°W
- Grid reference: ST281872
- Owner: Network Rail
- Manager: Transport for Wales
- Platforms: 1

Other information
- Station code: PYE

Key dates
- 14 December 2014: Opened

Passengers
- 2020/21: ▼16,454
- 2021/22: ▲73,110
- 2022/23: ▲0.100 million
- 2023/24: ▼91,730
- 2024/25: ▲0.125 million
Location
Notes
- Passenger statistics from the Office of Rail and Road

Pye Corner railway station is a station serving a residential area in the west of Newport, Wales, between the suburbs of Bassaleg and High Cross. It opened on 14 December 2014.

== History ==
=== Proposal ===
A report published by the South East Wales Transport Alliance (Sewta) in 2006 envisaged the extension of services on the Ebbw Valley Railway to Newport and the addition of new stations at Cwm and Pye Corner. It was forecast that 135,000 journeys would be made to and from Pye Corner which had a catchment population of 19,040 within 2 kilometres (1.2 mi) and 4,312 within 800 metres (870 yd). Provision of the station was set as a priority in Sewta's Regional Transport Plan published in 2008 and the aspiration was reflected in Network Rail's Wales Route Utilisation Strategy published in November 2008. Land for the station was safeguarded in Newport City Council's Unitary Development Plan.

In March 2012, proposals for a single-platform station, situated to the east of the line and accessed from a new road junction on Western Valley Road opposite High Cross Lane, were put out to consultation. The plans included provision for a second platform to be provided at a later date. In March 2013, the Secretary of State for Transport, Patrick McLoughlin, announced that Pye Corner was a "front-runner" in terms of funding for new stations, along with Ilkeston and Lea Bridge. The grant of £2.5m was confirmed in May 2013, to which the Welsh Government would add a further £1m.

The station's location is close to the former Bassaleg Junction station.

=== Construction ===
In February 2014, a planning application for the station was passed by Newport City Council, with planners recommending the construction of a screen or fence to protect the privacy of properties adjacent to the station which back on to the line. The first train to arrive at the station on the opening day of 14 December 2014 was the 09:15 from Ebbw Vale.

== Services ==
On Mondays to Saturdays, there are two trains per hour between Cardiff Central or Newport and Ebbw Vale Town. On Sundays, the Cardiff to Ebbw Vale service runs via Newport every two hours.

Preceding station	National Rail	Following station
Rogerstone	Transport for Wales; Ebbw Vale Town – Cardiff Central	Cardiff Central
Rogerstone	Transport for Wales; Ebbw Vale Town – Newport	Newport

== See also ==
- Railway stations in Newport
