= Ebbw Valley Railway =

Commuter railway line in Cardiff, Wales

Ebbw Valley Railway Rheilffordd Cwm Ebwy
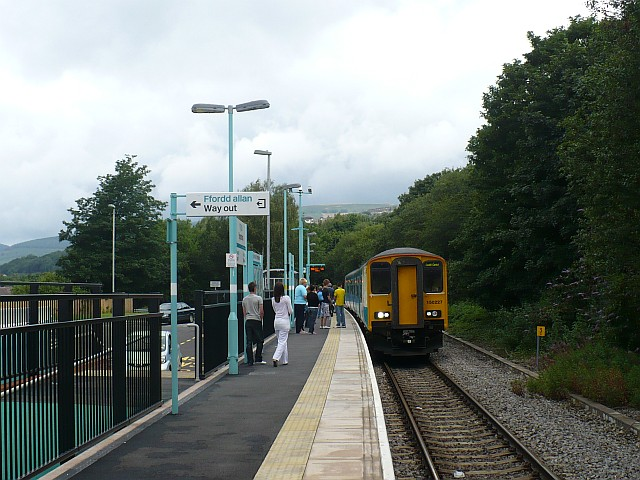
- Rogerstone railway station

Overview
- Status: Operational
- Owner: Network Rail
- Locale: Ebbw Valley, South Wales
- Termini: 51°46′55″N 3°12′22″W; 51°34′12″N 3°00′27″W
- Stations: 8

Service
- Type: Heavy rail
- System: National Rail
- Operator: Transport for Wales Rail
- Rolling stock: Class 197 DMUs

History
- Opened: 21 December 1850
- Closed: 30 April 1962
- Reopened: 6 February 2008

Technical
- Line length: 19 miles 57 chains (31.7 km)
- Number of tracks: Single track (Double track from Risca and Pontymister to Aberbeeg)
- Track gauge: 4 ft 8 1/2 in (1,435 mm) standard gauge
- Highest elevation: 820 feet (250 m)
Route map
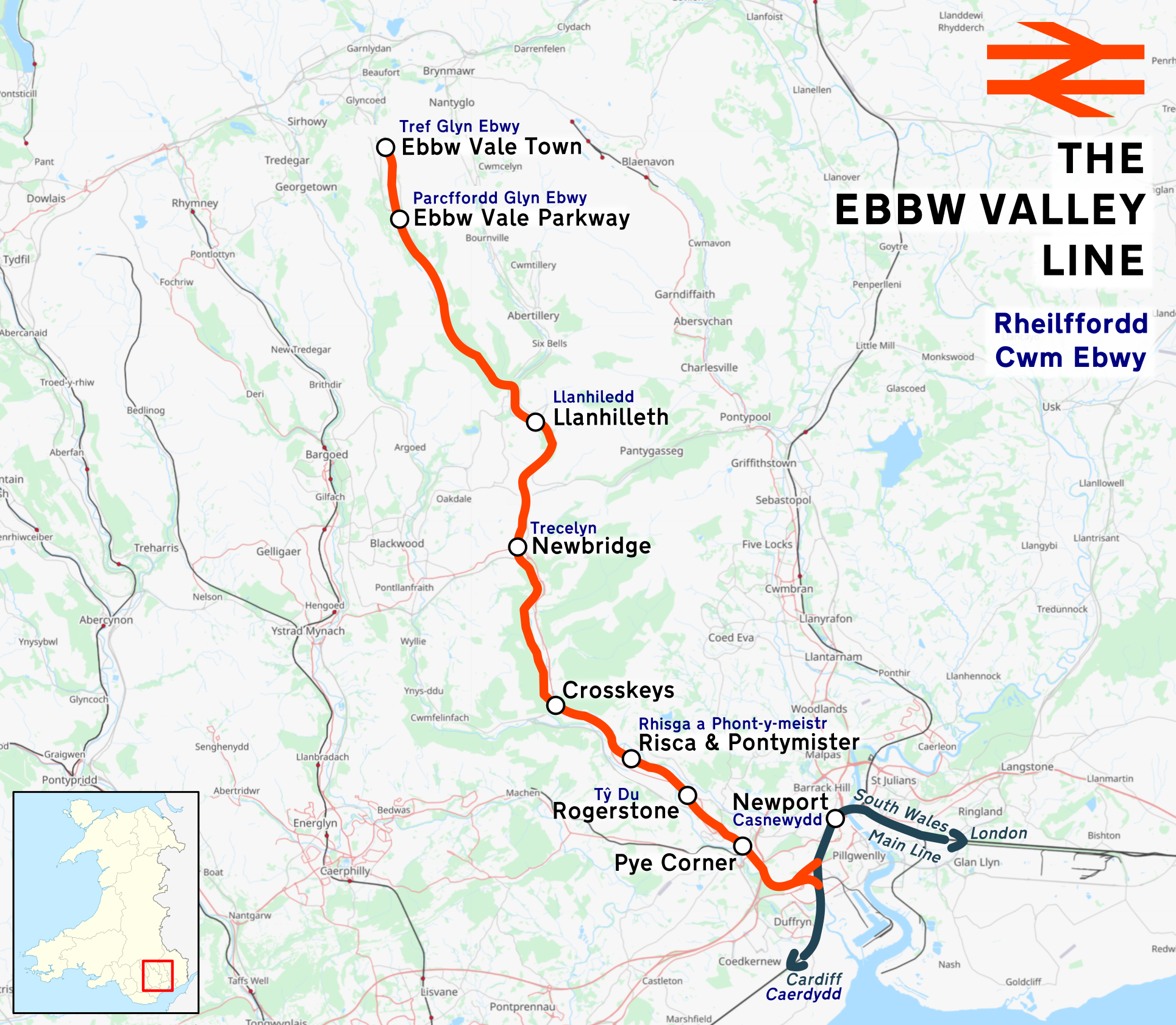
(Click to expand)

The Ebbw Valley Railway (Welsh: Rheilffordd Cwm Ebwy) is a branch line of the South Wales Main Line in South Wales. Transport for Wales Rail provides an hourly passenger service each way between Ebbw Vale Town and Cardiff Central, and an hourly service each way between Ebbw Vale Town and Newport.

The line was opened by the Monmouthshire Railway and Canal Company and the Great Western Railway (GWR) operated a passenger service from the 1850s between Newport and Ebbw Vale. The line became part of British Railways Western Region in 1948, following the nationalisation of the railways. Passenger services were withdrawn in 1962. However, the route continued to be used to carry freight to and from the Corus steelworks in Ebbw Vale, until its closure in 2002. Proposals to reopen the existing freight railway line to passenger services were first mooted in 1998. The Welsh Assembly Government announced their commitment to the project in 2002, as part of a package of measures to help the former steel communities.

Passenger services were restored to the line in February 2008, after a 46 years gap, using Class 150 diesel multiple units. Predominantly single track north of Newport, but with an extended 10 mile passing loop between Risca and Aberbeeg, the Ebbw Valley Railway runs 19 miles (31 km) along the Ebbw River valley from Ebbw Vale, before joining the South Wales Main Line at a triangular group of junctions in Newport – the line splitting at Park Junction with the eastbound section joining at Gaer Junction and the westbound section joining at Ebbw Junction. The line's stations and services are managed by Transport for Wales Rail.

== Current service ==
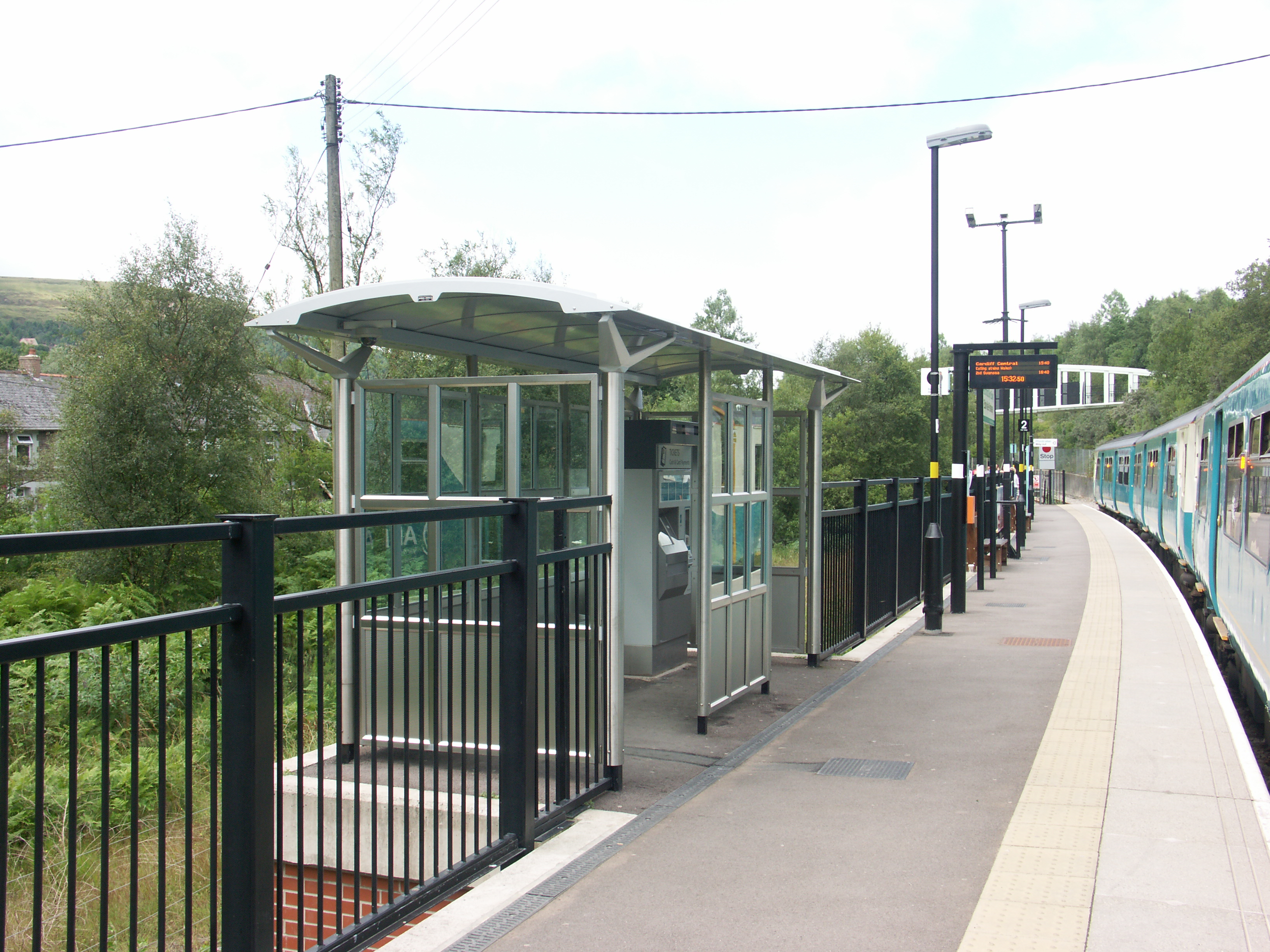
Sheltered waiting area with self-service ticket machine at Ebbw Vale Parkway

The Ebbw Valley Railway currently provides a half-hourly (two hourly Sundays) passenger service between Ebbw Vale Town and Pye Corner, where half of all services will continue to Cardiff Central, and half will continue to Newport during the day. Journey duration between Ebbw Vale Town and Cardiff Central is 60 minutes. Intermediate stations (their approximate journey times from Ebbw Vale Town are shown in brackets) are Ebbw Vale Parkway (3 minutes), Llanhilleth (11), Newbridge (17), Crosskeys (25), Risca and Pontymister (32), Rogerstone (34) and Pye Corner (38). A dedicated feeder bus services link the line to Abertillery town centre from Llanhilleth.

Actual passenger numbers greatly exceed forecasts. In 2002, passenger journeys were forecast at 22,000 per month. Whereas by 2008, 44,000 journeys had been made on the service each month; also exceeding the monthly target of 33,000 set for 2012. In August 2008 Trish Law, Assembly Member for Blaenau Gwent, said she had received "many complaints of standing-room only and grossly overcrowded trains". Arriva Trains Wales provided extra carriages at busy times, Saturdays and holidays, to cope with the demand. Passenger journeys had exceeded 55,000 per month by May 2009, and by October 2009, over one million passenger journeys had been made on the line in the 20 months since its opening, comfortably exceeding the fourth-year target of 453,000.

Network Rail owns and manages the track and signalling; stations and services are operated by the existing train operating company, Transport for Wales; and the local authorities each own and operate the station car parks in their areas. Each station has at least one Passenger Help Point and all stations and car parks have CCTV. All stations on the branch are unstaffed, and at first lacked any ticket issuing facilities; but in late 2009 a Scheidt & Bachmann Ticket XPress self-service ticket machine was installed at each station.

== History ==
=== Background ===
The line has its origins in the tramways and waggonways constructed to serve the various iron works in the upper Ebbw Valley to enable them to receive raw materials and dispatch products. Developments included:

- Rassa Railroad: a tramway built in 1794 to connect the Sirhowy Ironworks to the Beaufort Ironworks, and connected them to several limestone quarries at Trevil.
- Llanhiledd Tramroad: from Crumlin (low level) north to Ebbw Vale.
- Sirhowy Tramroad: a 4-foot-2-inch (1.27 m) plateway which opened in 1805 and ran from ironworks at Tredegar and Sirhowy to the Monmouthshire Canal. By 1805, a 24-mile (39 km) stretch of tramline had been laid to transport coal and iron ore to Newport Docks, laid jointly by Tredegar Iron and Coal Company and the Monmouthshire Canal Company. Initially the trains were pulled by teams of horses; however, in 1829 Chief Engineer Thomas Ellis was authorised to purchase a steam locomotive from the Stephenson Company. Built at Tredegar Works, it made its maiden trip on 17 December 1829. Due to its success, conversion to standard gauge was delayed until 1860 but, after reopening in 1865, it found that the traffic had been lost to its competitors. The line was worked by the London and North Western Railway from 1 July 1875 and taken over by the railway company the following year.
- Blaenavon Tramroad: a 3-foot-4-inch (1.02 m) edge-railway opened in 1795–1796 which linked the Blaenavon Ironworks with the Monmouthshire Canal at Pontnewydd. It was rebuilt in 1829 as a 4-foot-2-inch (1.27 m) gauge plateway.

The Monmouthshire Railway and Canal Company was incorporated on 31 July 1845 and, having acquired the Blaenavon Tramroad in the same year, it rebuilt and extended the line, which re-opened from Pontypool to Blaenavon (North) on 2 October 1854. Two short and steep branches to Cwmfrwdoer and Cwmnantddu were opened in 1870, with a third to Abersychan and Talywain in 1879. A 99-year lease of the line was granted to the Great Western Railway from 1 August 1875 and the railway company acquired the line on 1 August 1880.

=== Operations ===
The first passenger service on the line began on 21 December 1850, between Newport Courtybella and Blaina. The line was extended south to Newport Dock Street on 4 April 1852, and the northern extension from Aberbeeg to Ebbw Vale opened on 19 April 1852. Journeys between Ebbw Vale and Newport normally required passengers to change at Aberbeeg, although some services were direct. It was a branch line of the Great Western Railway (GWR), until the nationalisation of the railways under the Transport Act 1947, when the line became part of the Western Region of British Railways on 1 January 1948. The line closed to passenger traffic on 30 April 1962, prior to the Beeching Axe, with the mineral branches following on 7 April 1969 and the Talywain branch on 3 May 1980.

Freight services to and from the steelworks at Ebbw Vale continued until the site closed on 5 July 2002. The final freight service to run from the Corus steelworks in Ebbw Vale in 2003 removed scrap metal from site.

== Revival ==
=== Proposals ===
Peter Law, the former Assembly Member (AM) for Blaenau Gwent, had been calling for passenger services between Ebbw Vale and Newport to resume on the line since the 1980s, while he was still a councillor. An initial feasibility study of the proposal was carried out for Blaenau Gwent council by infrastructure project management company Capita Symonds in 1998. Stations at Ebbw Vale, Cwm, Aberbeeg, Abercarn, Risca and Maesglas were suggested, and the plans included running some trains to Cardiff Central via a new station at Celtic Lakes on the South Wales Main Line. Law made fighting for the line's re-opening one of his major election promises during the National Assembly for Wales election campaign in 1999. A plaque at Ebbw Vale Parkway commemorates Law, who died in 2006, and his work to re-open the line. It was unveiled by Jocelyn Davies AM on 10 December 2007, four days before the Ebbw Valley Railway's planned official re-opening.

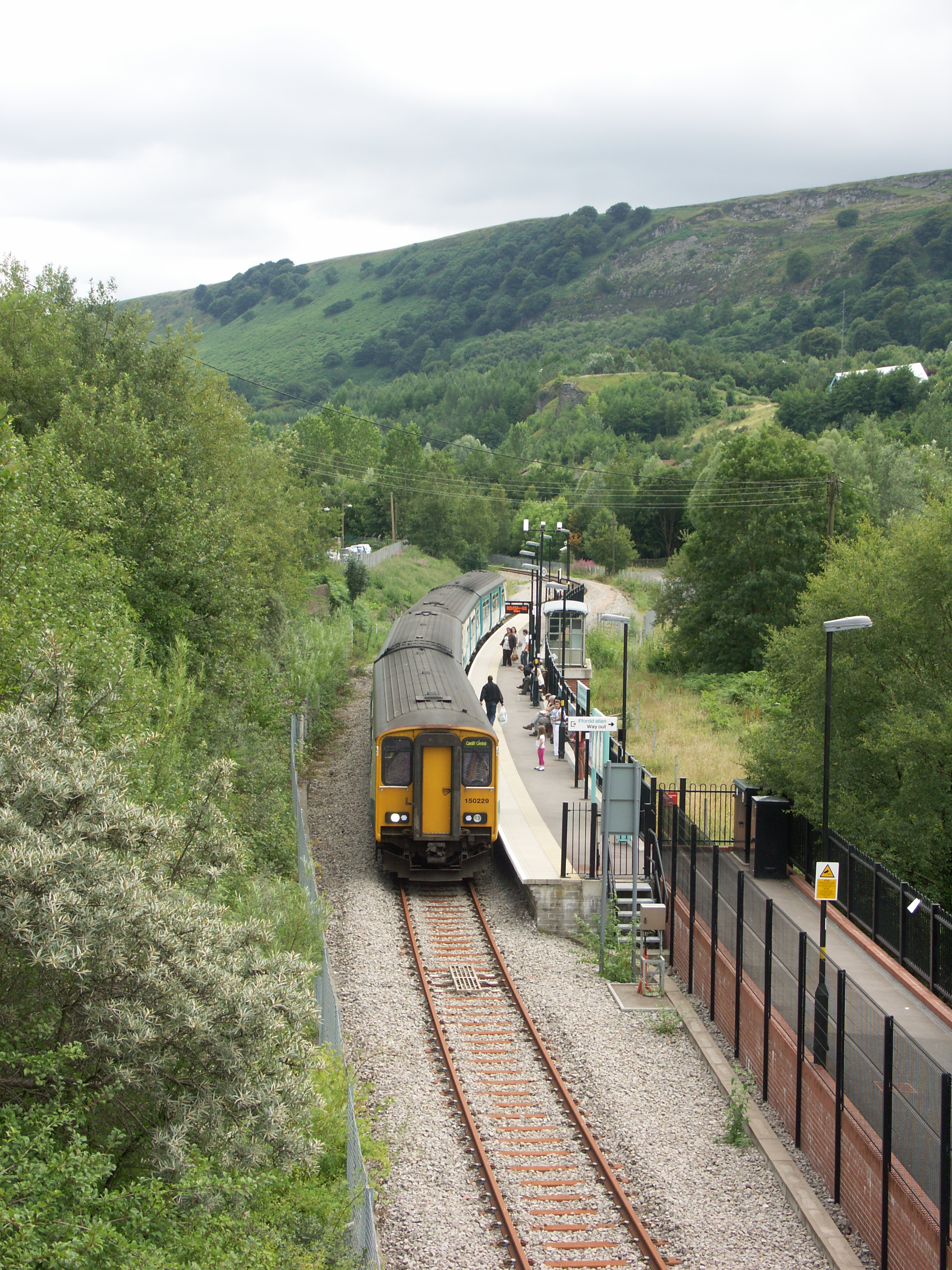
Ebbw Vale Parkway railway station

In February 2001 the Rail Development Society Wales, a passengers' campaign group now campaigning as Railfuture Cymru/Wales, called for the rail link between Ebbw Vale and Newport to be reopened to help with the regeneration of what it called "already a socially deprived area". The plea followed Corus Group's announcement that it would close its Ebbw Vale steelworks operation. British Steel Corporation had employed 14,500 people at their main steel mills in Ebbw Vale in the 1960s. The mills closed completely during the 1980s. Only a finishing plant employing 780 people remained on the site in 2001. First Minister Rhodri Morgan announced to the Welsh Assembly on 30 January 2002 that the rail link between Ebbw Vale and Cardiff would be reopened. Morgan said it would be part of a "package of measures to offset hundreds of steel job losses at the Corus plant". At the time, the Assembly Government's financial commitment was estimated at £7 million over two years, the project cost was estimated at £15 million and the line forecast to open in 2004.

Proposals for the Ebbw Valley line, forecast to cost £27.2 million, were unveiled to the public in January 2003. The scheme was to provide an hourly service to Cardiff beginning in 2005, followed by an hourly service to Newport beginning in 2009. The display included artists' impressions of the six new stations, envisaged to be built at Ebbw Vale Parkway Victoria, Llanhilleth, Newbridge, Crosskeys, Risca and Rogerstone. Proposed stations at Crumlin and Ebbw Vale Centre were shown in the Rail Atlas Great Britain and Ireland 11th edition, published 2007. The project was forecast to cost £28,583,544 in October 2003.

Electrification by 2019 was announced in the Department for Transport's High Level Output Specification of 2012.

=== Revival works programme ===
Work to restore the passenger service to the line took place between 2006 and 2008. The scheme was part of the response to the closure of Corus' Ebbw Vale steelworks in 2002, and the resulting economic downturn in one of Wales' most deprived areas. The project was led by Blaenau Gwent County Borough Council and supported by Caerphilly County Borough Council, Newport City Council, the Welsh Assembly Government and Network Rail. Capita Symonds project managed the scheme and the project contractor was Amey Rail, a subsidiary of Amey plc.

A start of main works event was held in Crumlin on 28 September 2006 and was attended by Welsh Assembly Members Andrew Davies (then Welsh Assembly Minister for Enterprise, Innovation and Networks), Irene James and Trish Law, the leaders of Blaenau Gwent and Caerphilly County Borough Councils, local councillors, officers and project stakeholders. The event marked the start of major works on the scheme with a demonstration of a new rail ballast cleaner. The works upgraded the existing track to passenger standard, and included new colour light signalling, level crossing renewal and the reinstatement of 3 miles (5 km) of double track, providing a point where trains could pass each other. Six new stations and eight new 97 metres (318 ft) long platforms were constructed. Services were originally expected to begin in the summer of 2007.

A report to Blaenau Gwent council in March 2008 showed that on completion, the project was more than £8.4 million over the original budget. Funding came from three sources. The European Regional Development Fund's Objective One structural funds provided £7.5 million through the Welsh European Funding Office, Corus Steelworks Regeneration Fund £7 million and the Welsh Assembly Government provided the balance. By January 2010, the total project cost, including the line extension to Ebbw Vale Town, had risen to an estimated £32.6 million.

The restoration scheme was named Welsh Project of the Year by the Royal Institution of Chartered Surveyors in 2009. The railway had been shortlisted in the community benefit category, along with the Royal Society for the Protection of Birds' Newport Wetlands Reserve and Swansea's Canolfan Gorseinon Centre.

=== Restoration of passenger service ===
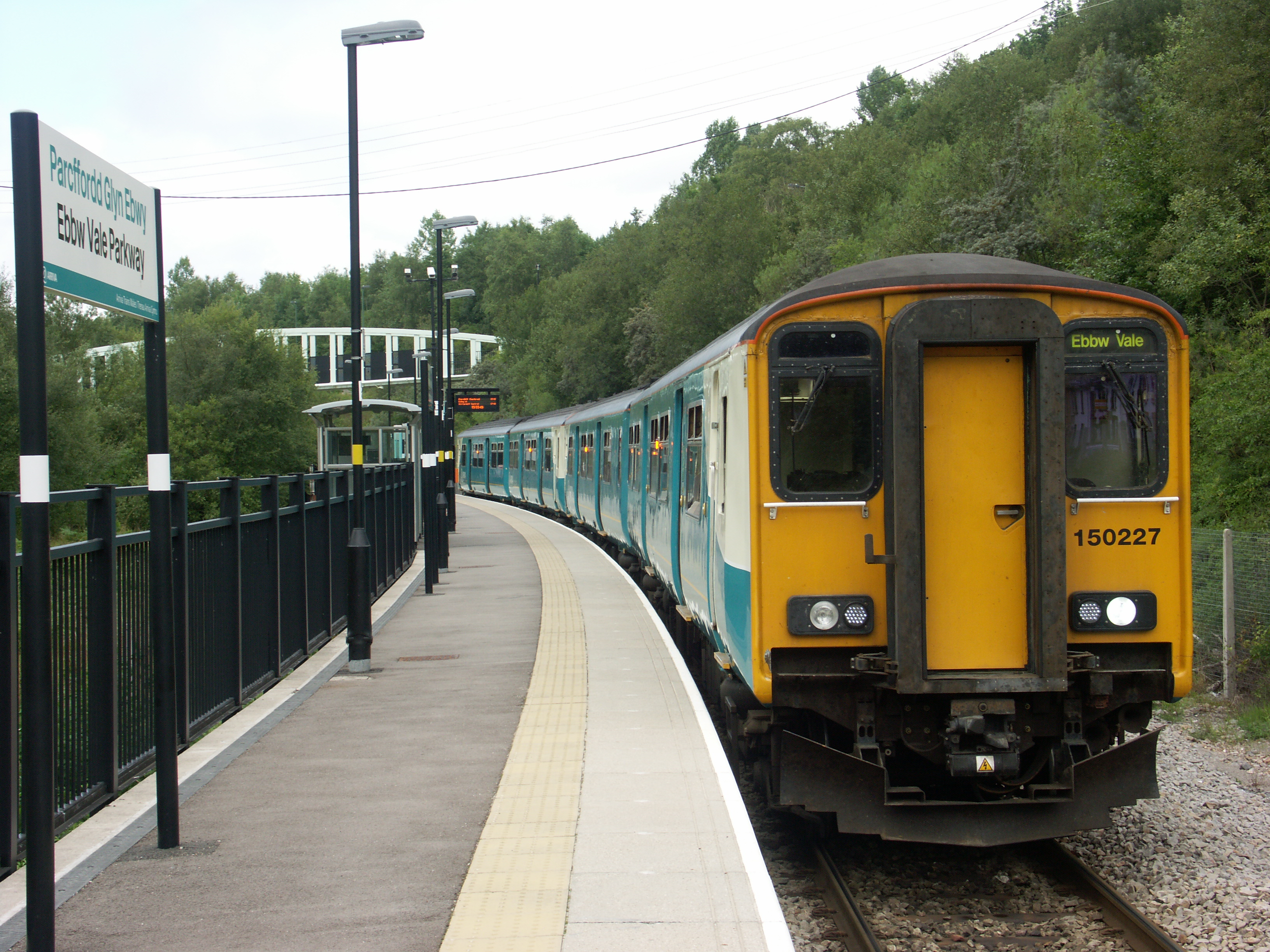
Arriva Trains Wales Class 150 DMU at Ebbw Vale Parkway

Passenger train services, using Class 150 diesel multiple units, were restored to the line after a gap of 46 years, on 6 February 2008; between a new station at Ebbw Vale Parkway (close to the site of the original Victoria station) and Cardiff Central. The first train of the restored service left Cardiff Central for Ebbw Vale Parkway at 06:35 on Wednesday 6 February 2008. The first train to run in the opposite direction left five minutes later, packed with dignitaries for the official opening. Deputy First Minister Ieuan Wyn Jones opened the line along with Blaenau Gwent County Borough Council's former Labour leader Hedley McCarthy. The first train from Ebbw Vale Parkway was waved off by local residents, who welcomed the link as a positive contribution to the valley's long term regeneration.

Celebrations had been due to take place on 14 December 2007 to mark the line's official opening. Arrangements included school choirs, brass bands, and plaques unveiled at each station by officials and dignitaries travelling the route between Rogerstone to Ebbw Vale. The ceremonies were cancelled two days before the scheduled reopening, as the project had not been finished on time due to "safety and engineering issues". Network Rail had confirmed in November that the new track had been tested successfully. After a final inspection on 16 December 2007 confirmed outstanding issues had been resolved, the track was handed over to Network Rail by Blaenau Gwent council. Network Rail and Arriva Trains Wales then arranged route familiarisation training for train drivers before the new service could be introduced. Driver training began on 18 December 2007.

Environmental issues delayed construction of two of the line's new stations. Colonies of slowworms, which have protected species status in the United Kingdom, were discovered near the tracks at the sites of Llanhilleth and Crosskeys stations. The lizards had to be moved to a safer place. Llanhilleth and Crosskeys stations opened on 27 April 2008 and 7 June 2008 respectively. Built at a cost of £3.5 million, Pye Corner station opened on 14 December 2014.

A feasibility study and further design work for a new station at Ebbw Vale Town was commissioned by the Welsh Assembly Government. The station on the former Corus steelworks site, which closed in 2002, is a mile north of the line's initial terminus, Ebbw Vale Parkway, and was forecast to cost £6.5 million. It was opened on 17 May 2015.

From 12 December 2019, a small number of services on the line started to be operated by TfW Rail's newly acquired Class 170 DMUs, and the units replaced the 150s as the line's primary traction and rolling stock from 16 December 2019.

Regular passenger services between Newport and Park Junction were restored from 13 December 2021, though services before 2024 only ran between Newport and Crosskeys, and not to and from Ebbw Vale. The service was set to be extended to Ebbw Vale Town in December 2023. Owing to a lack of suitable rolling stock, introduction of the new service was delayed, eventually commencing on 29 January 2024.

== Route ==
The Ebbw Valley Railway is a branch line of the Great Western Main Line. Predominantly single track, but with an 10 miles (16 km) double track section between Risca and Aberbeeg, the line runs 19 miles (31 km) between Ebbw Vale Town station, in the northeast of the mountainous South Wales valleys, and the South Wales Main Line. The track runs mainly south and southeast, following the deep-sided Ebbw River valley. The line is heavily curved along most of its route and has gradients of up to 1 in 65. Before the project to restore passenger services began, these conditions caused a maximum line speed on the line for freight services of 35 miles per hour (56 km/h). Extensive track re-canting has enabled the maximum line speed to be increased to 50 miles per hour (80 km/h).

The station at Ebbw Vale Town was opened on 17 May 2015, and became the new northern terminus of the line. Prior to this, the town was served by the Parkway station to the South.

Ebbw Vale Parkway station is 2 miles (3.2 km) south of Ebbw Vale town centre and provides car parking and cycle storage. Buses pick up and set down in the station car park. From Ebbw Vale Parkway the line is single track, facing south-southeast for the 5 miles (8 km) to the next stop at Llanhilleth. It runs past the villages of Cwm, where a new station is proposed, and Aberbeeg, which had proposals for a station included in an early plan. Proposals to reconstruct the spur running from Aberbeeg to Abertillery are being considered.

The line winds south from Llanhilleth for 2 3/4 miles (4.5 km), past the village of Crumlin, to the next station at Newbridge, at the eastern end of Newbridge town centre. Newbridge station provides Park and Ride car park and bus interchange facilities. To enable the additional service between Ebbw Vale and Newport to begin dual track would need to be laid and second platforms constructed at Llanhilleth and Newbridge stations, allowing trains to pass each other.

The line to Crosskeys, 3 1/4 miles (5.2 km) south of Newbridge, passes the village of Abercarn, another site that had proposals for a station included in an early plan. At Crosskeys the line changes direction from south to southeast for its remaining 7 miles (11 km) to the South Wales Main Line, continuing to follow the Ebbw Valley, past the confluence of the Ebbw River and the Sirhowy River. Crosskeys station has two platforms, one for northbound services and one for southbound. It is the only station on the Ebbw Valley Railway with no car parking facility, although public car parking is available nearby. The track is doubled from Crosskeys to Risca, providing a passing loop for 3 miles (4.8 km).

Risca and Pontymister station, 2 miles (3 km) southeast of Crosskeys, is in central Risca; the village of Pontymister is immediately to its southeast. It has two platforms, cycle lockers, a pick up/set down area near the northbound platform and a 94-space car park.

Rogerstone station is 1 1/4 miles (2 km) southeast of Risca and Pontymister station, and 3 3/4 miles (6 km) northwest of the South Wales Main Line. The station has one platform: the line reverts to single track after having passed Risca. Near the platform is a pick up/set down lay-by. Rogerstone station's car park has 64 spaces.

Pye Corner is the last southbound halt on the Ebbw Valley Railway. It is a single platform station, about 1 1/2 miles (2 1/2 km) southeast of Rogerstone station. Parking is provided for 62 cars and includes electric charging points.

The Ebbw Valley Railway meets the Great Western's South Wales Main Line branch, which runs on the coastal plain between the cities of Cardiff and Newport, at a triangular junction about 1 1/2 miles (2.4 km) southwest of Newport station. The line splits at Park Junction in the west; one section passes through Gaer Tunnel to form a north-facing connection with the main line at Gaer Junction, allowing trains to travel to Newport. The other section meets the main line at the south-facing Ebbw Junction and allows trains to reach Cardiff Central station, 10 miles (16 km) to the southwest.

== Proposed additional services ==
A second hourly service to Newport was long proposed for the line. A South East Wales Transport Alliance (Sewta) report in 2006 noted that additional infrastructure work would be required to enable the service to become half-hourly (one train running to Cardiff and another to Newport). An additional seven miles (11 km) of double track would be needed between Aberbeeg Junction and Crosskeys and additional platforms at Newbridge and Llanhilleth stations would be required. According to Network Rail, the points system at Gaer junction would need to be replaced before the line could be linked from Rogerstone station to Newport station. Major resignalling works would also need to be carried out. Passenger trains travel faster than freight trains, so the signals need to be further apart. The Welsh Assembly Government announced in July 2009 that the relevant works to enable direct trains between Ebbw Vale and Newport would be complete by 2011. Work on the track at Gaer Junction, Newport – connecting the Ebbw Valley Railway to Newport – had been scheduled for completion by October 2010, but no decision on the link will now be made before March 2011.

Rebuilding the branch to Abertillery, to replace the shuttle bus service, has been planned. The proposal for a new station and track (which would need to be re-laid for 1 3/4 miles (3 km) between Aberbeeg and Abertillery), is not included in the Welsh Assembly Government's National Transport Plan.

Network Rail will be carrying out further track improvement work in 2016–17 (to double the line between Aberbeeg and Crosskeys, as mentioned above, and to raise the line speed) and hopes to complete the project in 2018. This will allow the introduction of a regular service to Newport and Abergavenny in addition to the current one to and from Cardiff. On 19 March 2021, the Welsh Government announced that it would spend £70 million on adding passenger services to Newport. Services between Newport and Crosskeys began operating on 13 December 2021, but suspended in March 2023. Services are set to be resumed from December 2023, running to Ebbw Vale Town.

In September 2020 Network Rail replaced a bridge in Crumlin that carried the railway over the River Ebbw. The new structure, made of concrete and steel, cost £5 million and will allow for two tracks in preparation for future doubling of the line and increases in service.

== Passenger volume ==
Station usage
Station name	2007–08	2008–09	2009–10	2010–11	2011–12	2012–13	2013–14	2014–15	2015–16	2016–17	2017–18	2018–19	2019–20	2020–21	2021–22	2022–23
Ebbw Vale Town									167,642	232,206	244,590	244,294	227,126	47,324	148,194	199,616
Ebbw Vale Parkway	52,419	252,414	233,946	246,718	246,102	254,956	263,538	253,904	101,634	57,108	53,218	38,834	44,100	7,654	24,918	30,452
Llanhilleth	10	40,946	66,684	75,342	76,000	76,308	77,800	77,912	80,090	87,736	84,284	78,566	75,226	11,884	53,112	66,510
Newbridge	20,573	115,676	120,678	132,092	130,970	133,672	134,154	132,440	127,100	135,866	134,570	130,206	128,288	36,694	85,036	108,588
Crosskeys	8	67,334	103,734	107,674	117,362	117,012	119,362	113,926	118,742	118,604	122,656	110,526	99,846	12,474	53,018	72,072
Risca and Pontymister	21,792	101,594	99,964	107,330	103,770	100,236	108,734	107,786	100,960	111,344	99,326	92,144	87,082	16,906	55,560	72,414
Rogerstone	10,760	71,030	92,230	101,446	98,556	101,366	115,110	105,938	85,658	90,088	90,610	81,522	85,112	14,924	55,242	70,426
Pye Corner								15,052	63,332	81,342	96,698	106,156	111,858	16,454	73,110	100,236
The annual passenger usage is based on sales of tickets in stated financial years from Office of Rail and Road estimates of station usage. The statistics are for passengers arriving and departing from each station and cover twelve-month periods that start in April. Methodology may vary year on year. Usage from the periods 2019-20 and especially 2020-21 onwards have been affected by the Covid-19 pandemic

== See also ==
- Commuter rail in the United Kingdom
- Passenger rail terminology
