= Ebbw Vale Town railway station =

Railway station in Blaenau Gwent, Wales

Ebbw Vale Town Welsh: Tref Glyn Ebwy
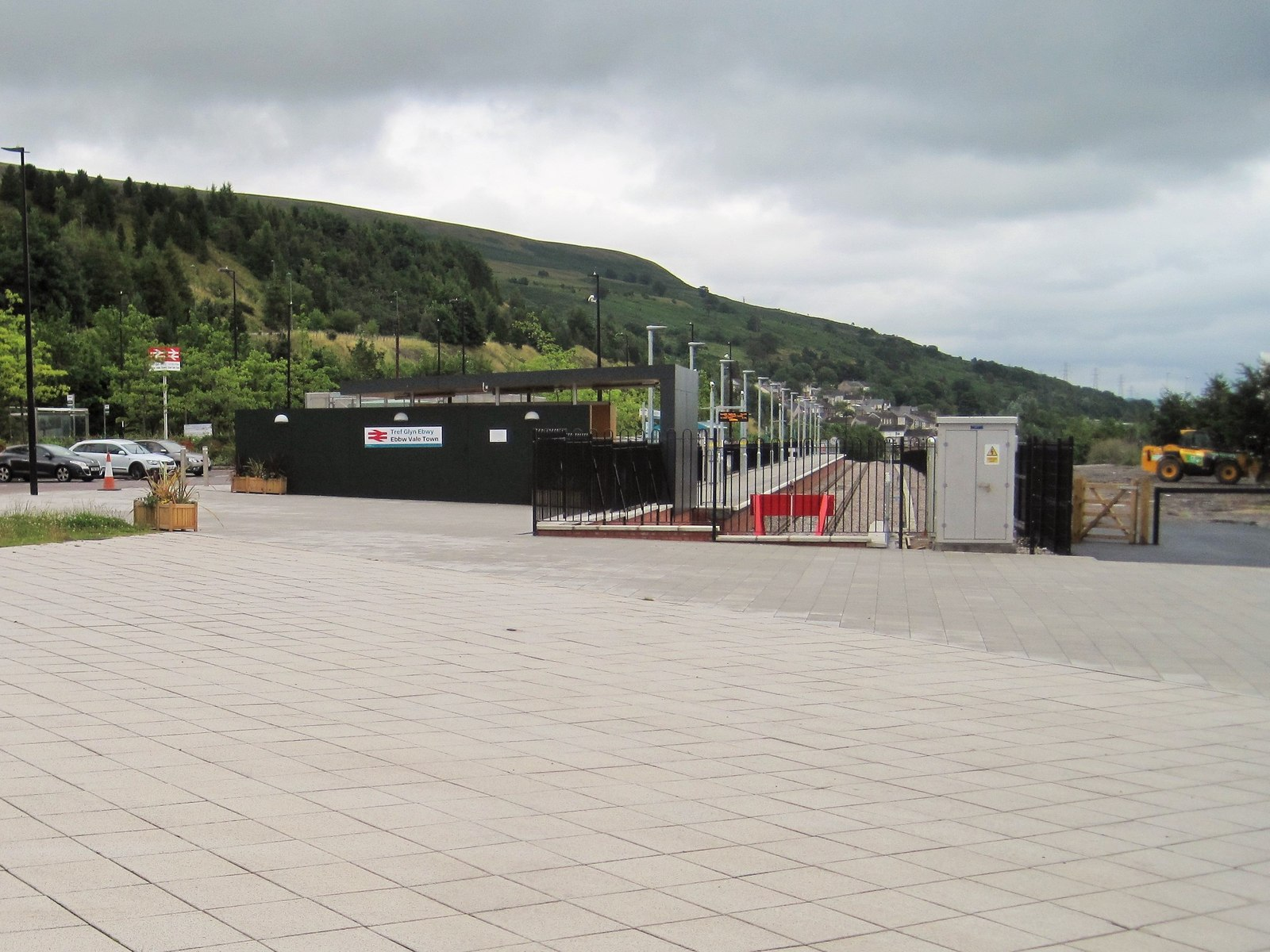

General information
- Location: Ebbw Vale, Blaenau Gwent; Wales
- Coordinates: 51.776°N 3.202°W
- Grid reference: SO168099
- Owner: Network Rail
- Manager: Transport for Wales
- Platforms: 1

Other information
- Station code: EBB

Key dates
- 17 May 2015: Opened

Passengers
- 2020/21: ▼47,324
- 2021/22: ▲0.148 million
- 2022/23: ▲0.200 million
- 2023/24: ▼0.189 million
- 2024/25: ▲0.249 million
Location
Notes
- Passenger statistics from the Office of Rail and Road

Ebbw Vale Town railway station (Welsh: Gorsaf rheilffordd Tref Glyn Ebwy) serves the town centre of Ebbw Vale in Blaenau Gwent, Wales, serving as the terminus of the Ebbw Valley Railway.

== History ==
The origins of the Ebbw Valley Railway can be traced to the wooden tramways and waggonways which served the various coal mines and steel works in the upper Ebbw Valley, to enable them to receive raw materials and dispatch products. Developments around Ebbw Vale itself were most associated with the Beaufort Ironworks Tramway, which opened in 1798 between the ironworks as far as Crumlin. On 23 December 1850, the Monmouthshire Railway and Canal Company introduced a regular passenger service between Newport Courtybella and Blaina. Services were extended to Ebbw Vale on 19 April 1852 after improvement works had been carried out to the 9.5 miles (15.3 km) section between Aberbeeg and Ebbw Vale. Originally developed as a single-platform station, by 1923 at the time of railway grouping Ebbw Vale (Low Level) railway station boasted a staff of 44.

Ebbw Vale (High Level) railway station was opened by the London and North Western Railway on 2 September 1867. To distinguish the two Ebbw Vale stations, British Railways added the suffix "High Level" (the L&NWR station) on 23 May 1949 and "Low Level" (the GWR station) on 19 July 1950. High Level closed to passengers on 5 February 1951, while Low Level closed to passengers on 30 April 1962. Closure of the Low Level line to goods traffic came on 1 December 1969.

== Development ==
In the 2008 Network Rail Route Utilisation Strategy, the link between Ebbw Vale and Newport was identified for implementation in the period 2009–2018. In May 2013, the Welsh Government announced that the Ebbw Vale line would be extended from the existing terminus at Ebbw Vale Parkway to the new station at Ebbw Vale Town. A total of £11.5 million was agreed to fund the station, line extension and associated landscaping for the surrounding area. Two weeks later, funding was also agreed for Pye Corner railway station, also along the line.

=== Opening ===
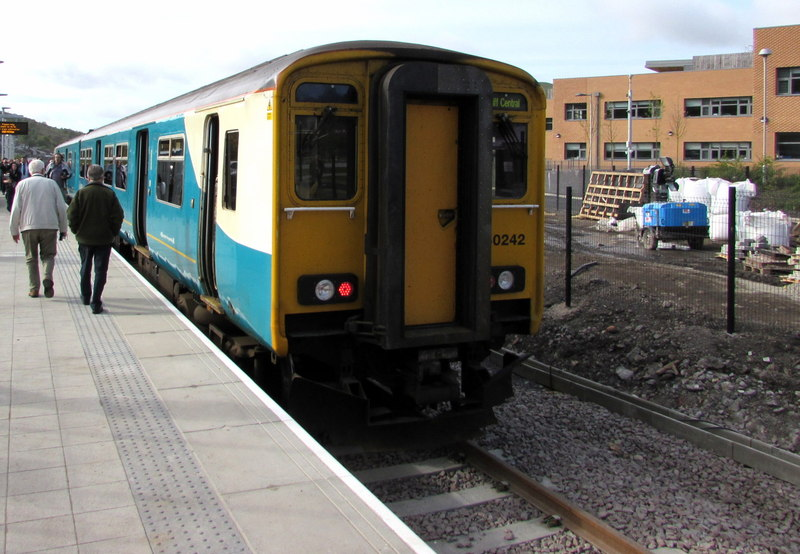
First train at Ebbw Vale Town

The Ebbw Vale Town Station extension opened 17 May 2015. Upon opening, Monday-Saturday, there was an hourly service between here and Cardiff Central, and a two-hourly service that additionally called at Newport.

=== Stage two ===
Under the proposals of stage two of the project, a half-hourly service would be introduced, and a two-platform station would be built as the northern terminus of the line, close to the old British Steel General Office Site part of "the Works" development. This can only be enabled through additional passing loops and track infrastructure being provisioned by 2018 in the Newport and Crosskeys to Llanhilleth area. Funding for the project will mainly come from the Welsh Government, and many other stakeholders.

== Services ==
As of 15 December 2024 there is an hourly service between here and Maesteg, and an hourly service between here and Newport, forming a half hourly service between Ebbw Vale Town and Pye Corner. There is an irregular service on Sundays, with 7 trains a day operating between here and Cardiff Central via Newport, and 1 train per day between here and Maesteg on weekdays and Cardiff Central; that does not serve Newport.

Preceding station	National Rail	Following station
Terminus	Transport for Wales; Ebbw Vale Town - Maesteg	Ebbw Vale Parkway

== Bus station ==
The station is an eight-minute walk from the Ebbw Vale bus station (also known as Inner Bypass), which is the terminus for a number of Stagecoach South Wales services to Cardiff, Abergavenny, Brynmawr, Tredegar, and other nearby villages.
