= Caerleon railway station =

Disused railway station in Wales

Coordinates: 51°36′50.9″N 2°57′30.9″W

Caerleon
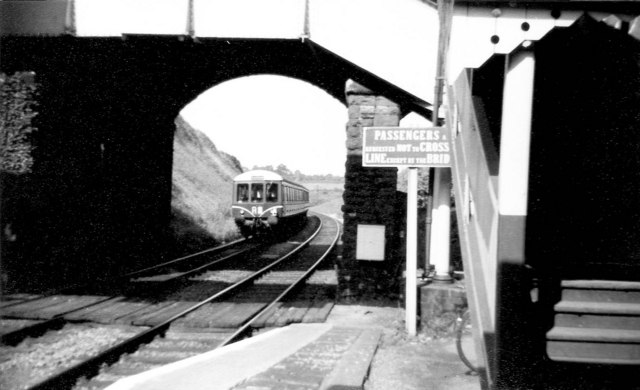
- Station in 1959.

General information
- Location: Caerleon, Newport; Wales
- Grid reference: ST337910
- Platforms: 2

Other information
- Status: Disused

History
- Original company: Pontypool, Caerleon and Newport Railway
- Pre-grouping: Great Western Railway
- Post-grouping: Great Western Railway

Key dates
- 21 December 1874: Opened
- 30 April 1962: Closed to passengers
- 29 November 1965: Closed to all traffic
Location

Caerleon railway station is a former station serving Caerleon on the east side of the city of Newport, Wales and a proposed future station as part of the South Wales Metro.

== History ==
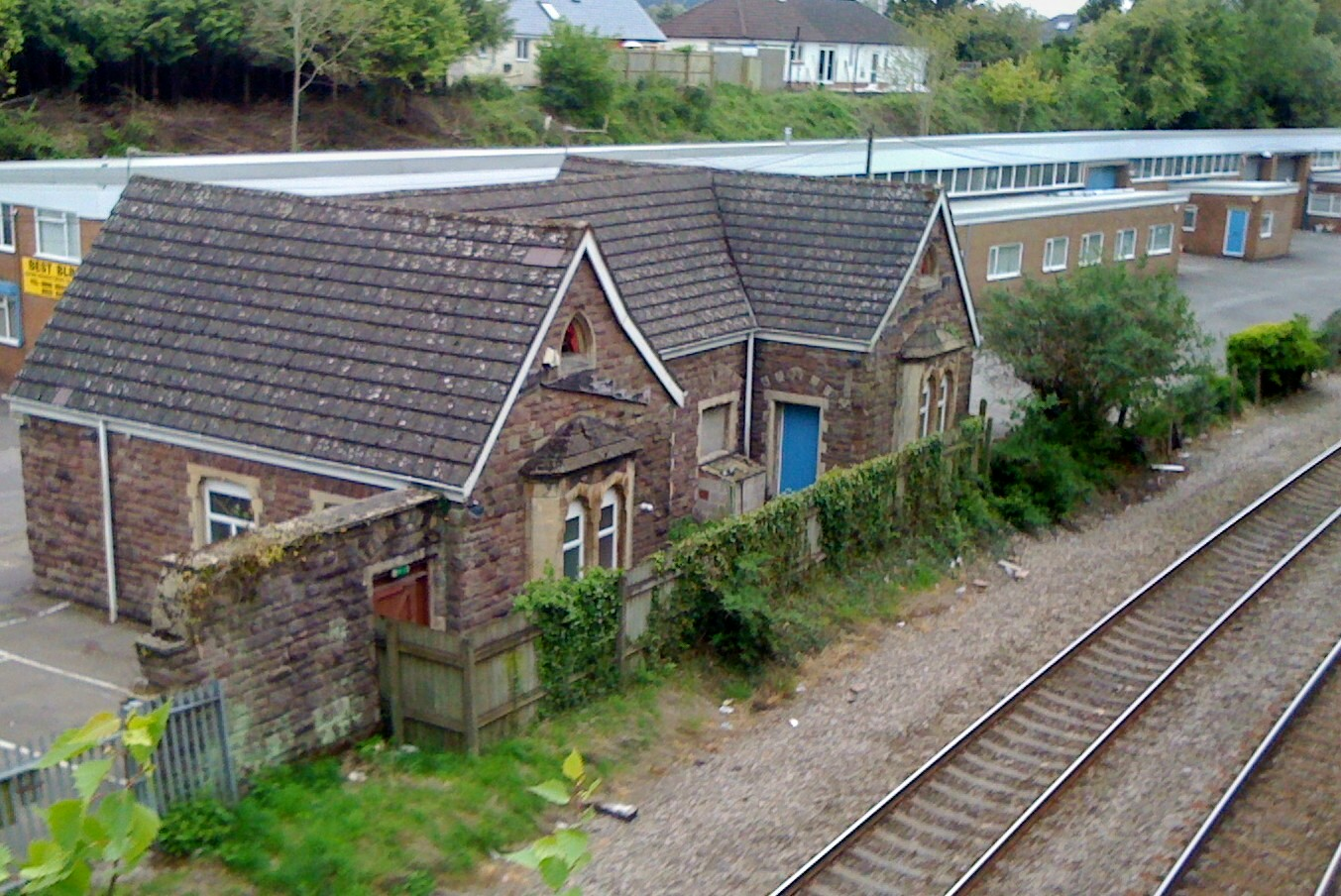
Station buildings in Caerleon awaiting platform rebuilding and station re-opening on the Welsh Marches Line

The station was opened by the Pontypool, Caerleon and Newport Railway on 21 December 1874. This came after the absorption of the Pontypool company by the Great Western Railway. The station closed to passengers on 30 April 1962 and to all traffic on 29 November 1965.

The site is now mixed use business premises including a gym, MOT centre and Veterinary Clinic.

== Proposed reopening ==
The Newport City Council unitary development plan and Sewta rail strategy in 2006 set out plans for the station to be re-opened. Assessments by Capita Symonds in 2010 evaluated the cost of the project as £14.1m, and highlighted it would be of particular importance given the popular restaurant and pub environment in the town, as well as the 70,000 yearly visitors to the Roman tourist attractions nearby. Caerleon is particularly suited to public transport improvements as it has long had poor air quality. It has been subject to a Newport City Council air quality management area study since January 2018 due to the low standard of air quality in the town centre.

The Welsh Government has commissioned Arup to review the Caerleon Station Grip 3 Report land around the site has been safeguarded by Newport City Council for future reopening but in the near term the station has been neglected in favour of other reopenings predominantly in the Cardiff area.

Nevertheless, Newport City Council has discussed preliminary matters such as the provision of approximately half a hectare for car parking, subject to exact provision being agreed with Welsh Government.

The rail operator Transport for Wales announced in 2018 that Caerleon is a target for reopening as part of the South Wales Metro project. It would join similar proposed facilities at Magor, Cardiff Parkway, and Llanwern.

Proposals to reopen Caerleon station were strengthened following the decision by First Minister Mark Drakeford in 2019 to reject the M4 relief road, which now allows up to £1.4bn to be allocated through the Welsh Government's borrowing facility for improving infrastructure in and around the south east Wales M4.

== Services ==
Preceding station	Historical railways	Following station
Ponthir; Line open, station closed	Great Western Railway; Pontypool, Caerleon and Newport Railway	Newport High Street; Line and station open
	Future services	
Cwmbran; Line and station open	Transport for Wales; Welsh Marches Line	Newport; Line and station open

== See also ==
- Railway stations in Newport
- South Wales Metro
- Transport for Wales
- Proposed railway stations in Wales
