= Newport West Central railway station =

Proposed railway station in Wales

Coordinates: 51°34′17″N 3°00′32″W

Newport West Central

General information
- Location: Maesglas, Newport; Wales
- Grid reference: ST300863
Location

Newport West Central railway station is a proposed station on the Ebbw Valley Railway in the city of Newport, Wales.

== History ==
The station is proposed in SEWTA's Rail Strategy to serve the Monmouthshire Bank redevelopment area. The site for the station is on Bideford Road, adjacent to the Harlech Retail Park. Access to the Monmouthshire Bank redevelopment area will be via the original Western Valley Line bridge over the South Wales Main Line.

The station received attention from the Welsh Government in 2011 following queries made by South Wales East AM Jocelyn Davies, but has in recent years been neglected in favour of station reopenings in the Cardiff area.

== Recent developments ==
Following the decision by First Minister Mark Drakeford in 2019 to reject the M4 relief road proposal, up to £1.4bn is available through the Welsh Government's borrowing facility for improving infrastructure in and around the south east Wales M4. Reopenings in Newport have as a result been again debated.

Preceding station	Future services	Following station
Cardiff Central	Transport for Wales; South Wales Main Line	Newport

== See also ==
- South Wales Metro
- Transport for Wales
- Proposed railway stations in Wales
