= Magor railway station =

Former railway station in Wales

Coordinates: 51.578010°N 2.831002°W

Magor
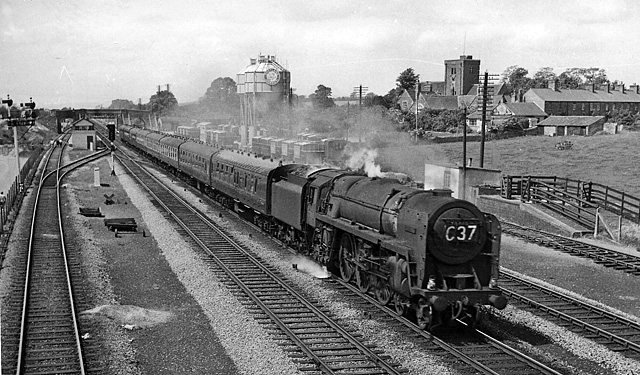

General information
- Location: Magor, Monmouthshire; Wales
- Platforms: 4

Other information
- Status: Disused

History
- Original company: South Wales Railway
- Pre-grouping: Great Western Railway

Key dates
- 16 June 1850: Opened (Chepstow to Swansea)
- 2 November 1964: Closed
Location

Magor railway station is a former station serving Magor, Monmouthshire, east of the city of Newport and west of Caldicot. It was opened as a broad gauge line with the South Wales Railway in 1850 and closed to passengers in 1964. The line was quadrupled in 1941.

== Campaign for reopening ==
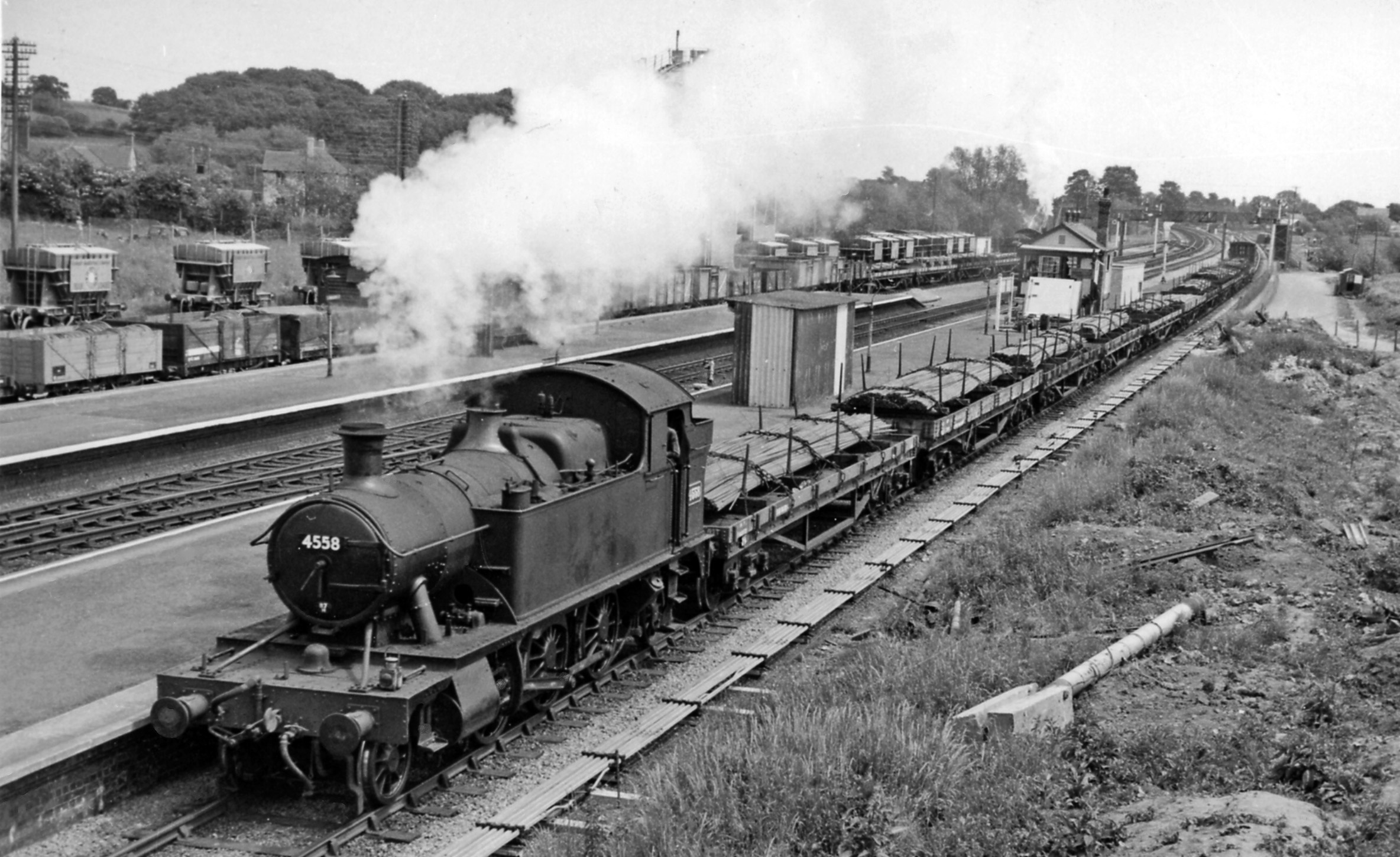
Magor station in 1961

The Sewta rail strategy plan and Monmouthshire County Council plans have considered reopening the station, but the decision has been made to redevelop Severn Tunnel Junction railway station in preference.

In July 2013 the Magor Action Group on Rail (MAGOR) was formed to campaign for a station to be re-opened to serve the communities of Magor and Undy after a local man Luke Dearden appealed in the local argus to rail planners to rethink a previously rejected plan This was despite the earlier Sewta plans to develop Severn Tunnel Junction, as a number of factors have changed since then.

The population of Magor and Undy has grown significantly (as has train use), is the largest group of users that currently use Severn Tunnel Junction railway station and are within 10–15 minutes walking or cycling distance of the preferred new site. Monmouthshire County Council has agreed to take forward work on a business case.

In November 2016, Monmouthshire council made an application to the Department of Transport for £5.2 million towards the opening the station but was not successful. The total cost was expected to be £7 million with the Welsh Government providing the remaining funds.

In June 2019, residents of Magor submitted a business case to the Welsh Government to reopen the station as part of the South Wales Metro scheme following the cancellation of the M4 relief road. The proposal involves a 'walkway' station which would not provide car parking, instead focussing on active travel and walkability for the village's 6,000 residents.

== Services ==
Preceding station	Historical railways	Following station
Undy Halt; Line open, station closed	Great Western Railway; South Wales Railway	Llanwern; Line open, station closed
	Future services	
Llanwern; Line open, station closed	Transport for Wales; South Wales Main Line	Severn Tunnel Junction; Line and station open

== See also ==
- Railway stations in Newport
- South Wales Metro
- Transport for Wales
- Proposed railway stations in Wales
