= Railway stations in Newport =

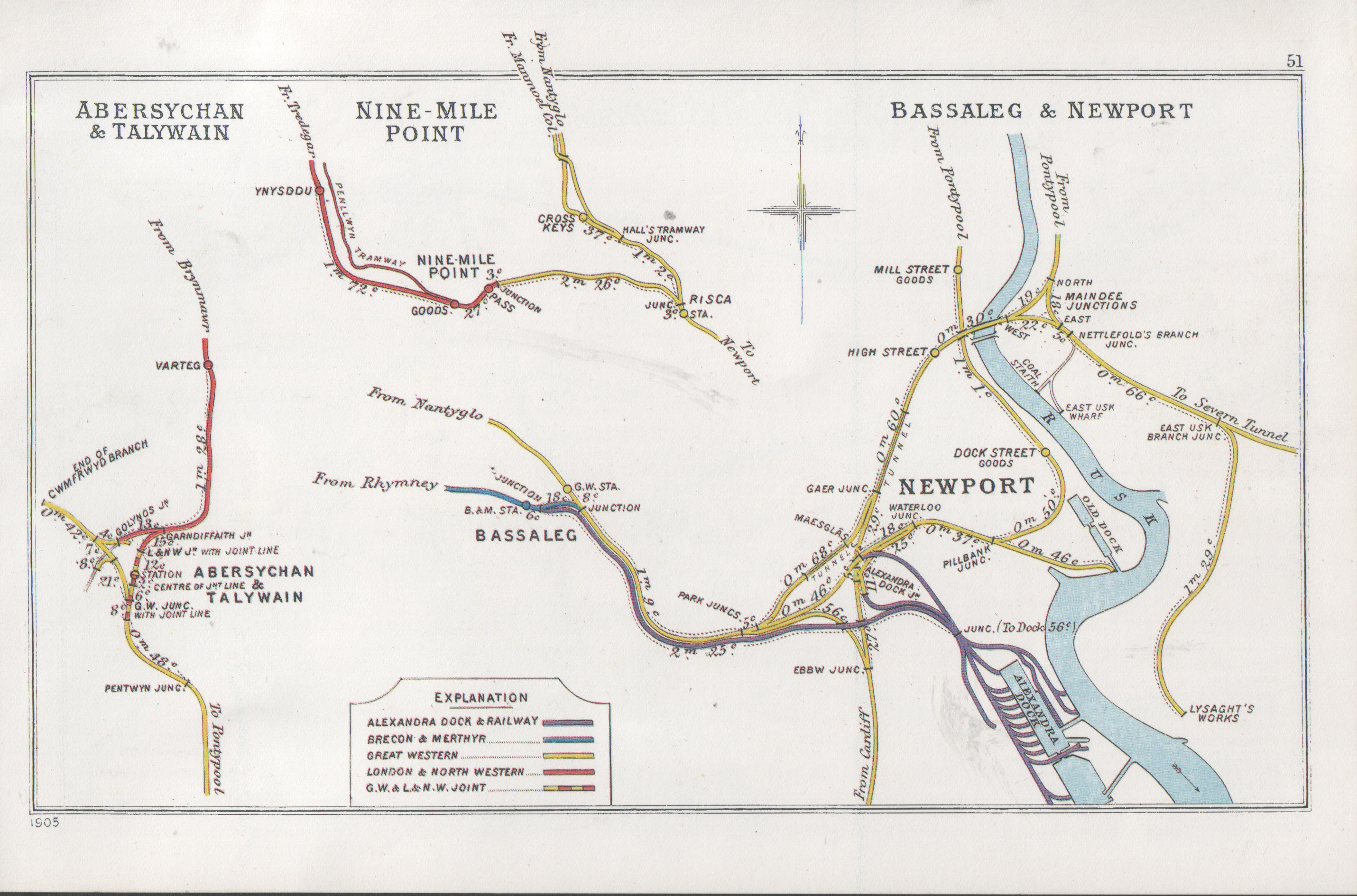
Railway Clearing House map from 1905

There have been many railway stations in Newport, due to its importance as a port for the industrial Monmouthshire and Glamorganshire valleys. The only stations in use at the moment are Newport in the city centre and in the Western valley Pye Corner and Rogerstone.

== History ==
- 19 June 1850 Newport High Street was opened by the South Wales Railway.
- 21/23 December 1850 A temporary terminus station was opened at Courtybella on the Monmouthshire Railway and Canal Company's Western Valley line.
- 1 July 1852 The Monmouthshire Railway and Canal Company opened a temporary station at Marshes Turnpike Gate on Barrack Hill as the southern terminus of its Eastern Valley line from Pontypool.
- 4 August 1852 Newport Dock Street was opened by the Monmouthshire Railway on its Western Valley line.
- 9 March 1853 Newport Mill Street opened to replace the Barrack Hill terminus.
- May 1855 the Eastern Valley line was connected to the Western Valley line at Dock Street.
- 1 August 1863 Amalgamation of the South Wales Railway and the Great Western Railway amalgamated.
- 17 September 1874 Pontypool, Caerleon and Newport Railway opened from Pontypool South Junction to Maindee Junctions for goods trains.
- 21 December 1874 Passenger trains on the Pontypool, Caerleon and Newport Railway run to High Street station.
- April 1878 Connection made from Llantarnam Junction on the Pontypool, Caerleon and Newport Railway to Cwmbran Junction on Eastern Valley line. Eastern Valley trains divert, via Caerleon, to Newport High Street.
- 1 January 1879 Park Junction to Gaer Junction opened allowing the Western Valley line access to use High Street station.
- 1 August 1880 Monmouthshire Railway and Canal Company and Great Western Railway amalgamated. Mill Street and Dock Street passenger stations closed.
- 28 November 1966 Newport Mill Street yard closed.

== Former suburban stations ==
The following list of stations are all within the present city boundary, although all have subsequently closed:

- Bassaleg Junction (1850-1962)
- Bassaleg (1865-1962)
- Caerleon (1874-1962)
- Llanwern (1850-1960)
- Marshes Turnpike Gate (1852-1853)
- Marshfield (1850-1959)
- Newport Courtybella (1850-1852)
- Newport Mill Street (1853-1880)
- Newport Dock Street (1852-1880)
- Rhiwderin (1865-1954)

== The future ==
There are plans to operate services to Newport station on the newly reopened Ebbw Valley Railway and re-open more former stations on the line as part of a wider transport strategy for the city. Currently services operate between Ebbw Vale Town and Cardiff Central.

The Newport Unitary Development Plan lists the following policies in part 4 under "Public Transport":

Railways

T1 The railway system will be safeguarded and developed by:

1. The provision of new stations at Caerleon, Coedkernew (Newport West), Rogerstone, Bassaleg (Pye Corner), Maesglas (Newport West Central) and Llanwern;
2. the protection of disused railway lines from development;
3. Protecting and encouraging rail access to industrial development;
4. Promoting the re-opening of the Western Valley line to passenger traffic;
5. Supporting improved rail links to Newport Docks and river wharves;
6. Promoting the upgrading of the South Wales Main Line and through services to the continent;
7. Supporting applications for government grant for new rail facilities.
