= Newport West railway station =

Proposed railway station in Newport, Wales

Newport West

General information
- Location: Newport; Wales
- Coordinates: 51.563°N 3.007°W
- Grid reference: ST3028885409
- Platforms: 2
Location

Newport West railway station is a proposed station to serve the western suburbs of the city of Newport, Wales.

== History ==
The Newport City Council unitary development plan sets aside an area in Coedkernew adjacent to the Great Western Main Line for the station. As of May 2008 three parcels of land have been acquired by the urban regeneration company Newport Unlimited at the site of the station. The Network Rail Route Utilisation Strategy published in November 2008 confirms the SEWTA aspiration for a station in Coedkernew.

== Recent developments ==
The land around the site has been safeguarded by Newport City Council for "the Welsh Government's proposed Coedkernew Rail Station and strategic park-and-ride currently under consideration" but has in recent years been neglected in favour of station reopenings in the Cardiff area.

However following the decision by First Minister Mark Drakeford in 2019 to reject the M4 relief road proposal, up to £1.4bn is available through the Welsh Government's borrowing facility for improving infrastructure in and around the M4. Reopenings in Newport have as a result been again debated. The most recent plan, as of October 2023, envisages the station to be situated adjacent to the Ebbw River in Duffryn.

Preceding station	Future services	Following station
Cardiff East	Transport for Wales; South Wales Main Line	Newport Central

== See also ==
- South Wales Metro
- Transport for Wales
- Proposed railway stations in Wales
