= SWML =

SWML may refer to:

- South Wales Main Line
- South West Main Line
