= Somerton railway station, Newport =

Proposed railway station in Newport, Wales

Somerton

General information
- Location: Newport; Wales
- Coordinates: 51.5851°N 2.9661°W
- Grid reference: ST3316087806
Location

Somerton railway station is a proposed station to serve the Somerton suburb of the city of Newport, Wales.

Following the decision by First Minister Mark Drakeford in 2019 to reject the M4 relief road proposal, up to £1.4bn is available through the Welsh Government's borrowing facility for improving infrastructure in and around the M4 motorway. Reopenings in Newport have as a result been again debated. The most recent plan, as of October 2023, envisages the station to be situated adjacent to the Somerton Road bridge, with access from Fairfax Road.

Preceding station	Future services	Following station
Newport Central	Transport for Wales; South Wales Main Line	Llanwern

== See also ==
- South Wales Metro
- Transport for Wales
- Proposed railway stations in Wales
