= Ely Mill railway station =

Proposed railway station in Wales

Coordinates: 51.4863°N 3.2400°W

Ely Mill

General information
- Location: Cardiff; Wales
- Managed by: Transport for Wales

Ely Mill is a proposed railway station in Cardiff, Wales, which will serve the Ely area of the city. It is planned as part of the South Wales Metro.

The station was on the Welsh Government New Railway Station Prioritisation in 2017.

Proposals were made in 2024 for an extension to improve rail connectivity across the city. The project was part of the UK government's "Restoring Your Railways" fund.

== See also ==
- South Wales Metro
- Transport for Wales
- Proposed railway stations in Wales
- Transport in Cardiff
