= Cardiff Bay railway station =

Railway station in Cardiff, Wales

Cardiff Bay Welsh: Bae Caerdydd
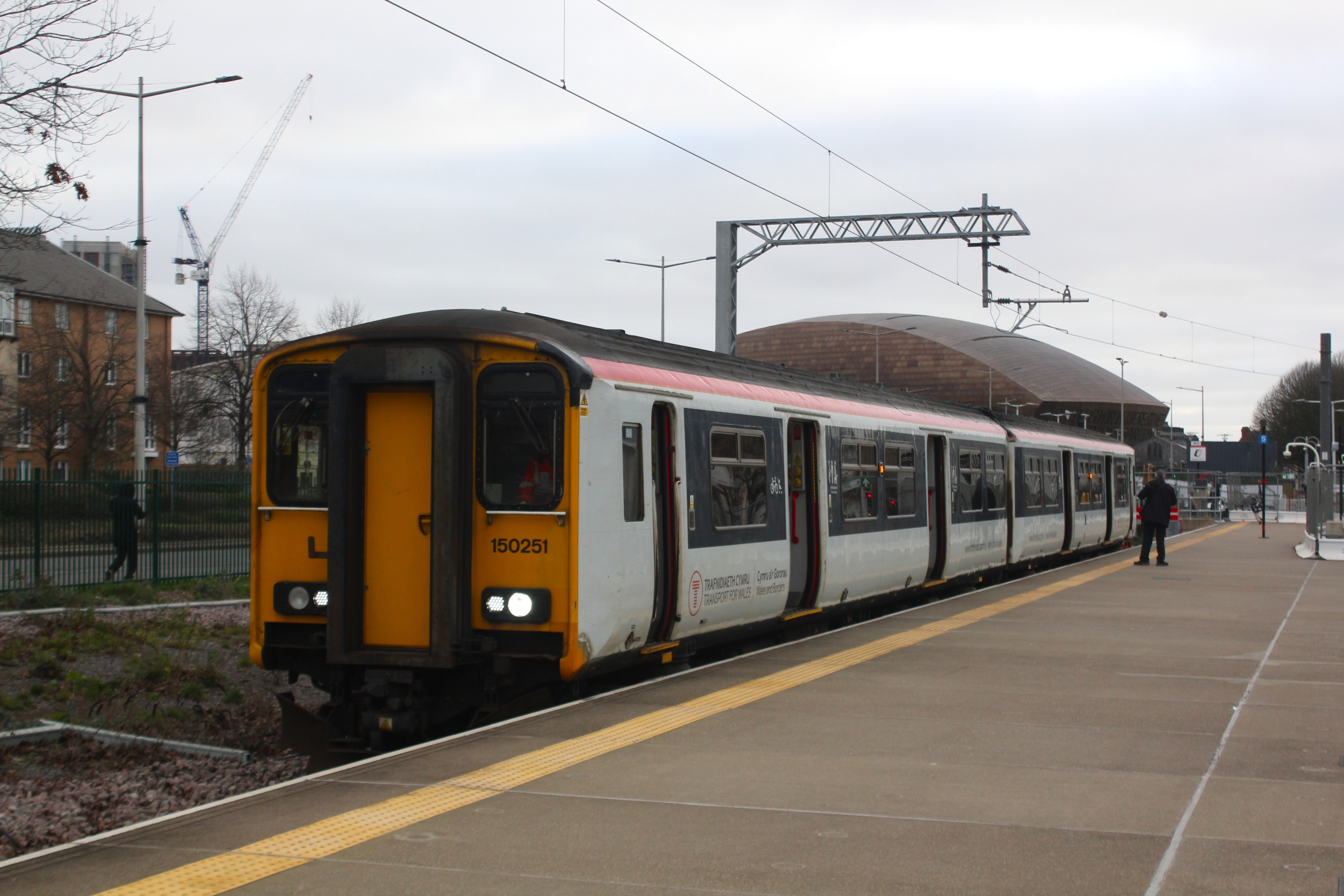
- Class 150 in platform 2 at Cardiff Bay, December 2025

General information
- Location: Cardiff Bay, Cardiff; Wales
- Coordinates: 51°28′02″N 3°09′59″W
- Grid reference: ST190748
- Manager: Transport for Wales
- Platforms: 2, but only 1 is currently in use

Other information
- Station code: CDB
- Classification: DfT category F1

Key dates
- 9 October 1840: Line opened
- December 1844: Station opened as Cardiff Bute Dock
- 1845: Renamed Cardiff Docks
- 1 July 1924: Renamed Cardiff Bute Road
- 26 September 1994: Renamed Cardiff Bay
- 26 May 2025: Platform 2 opened, Platform 1 closed for redevelopment

Passengers
- 2020/21: ▼88,028
- 2021/22: ▲0.315 million
- 2022/23: ▲0.511 million
- 2023/24: ▲0.547 million
- 2024/25: ▲0.756 million
Location
Notes
- Passenger statistics from the Office of Rail and Road

Cardiff Bay railway station (Welsh: Bae Caerdydd), formerly Cardiff Bute Road, is a station serving the Cardiff Bay and Butetown areas of Cardiff, Wales. It is the southern terminus of the Butetown branch line 1 mile (1.5 km) south of Cardiff Queen Street.

Until redevelopment is complete only one platform is in use. Platform 2 opened on 26 May 2025. The pre-existing Platform 1 closed on the same day to be redeveloped. The station building lies on Bute Street, although access to the station is from the nearby Lloyd George Avenue. For various reasons, including it being the origin of the first steam-powered passenger train service in Wales, the 1840s station building is a Grade II* listed building.

Passenger services are provided by Transport for Wales.

== History ==
The line to the docks was opened on 9 October 1840 but the station was not mentioned in Bradshaw's railway timetables until December 1844. It was opened as Cardiff Bute Dock but the name was changed to Cardiff Docks in 1845 by the Taff Vale Railway (engineer: Isambard Kingdom Brunel).

The station building came into use in 1843 and was the head office of the TVR until 1862, when new offices were built at Queen Street. After this it was let to the consulates of the Netherlands, Belgium, Portugal and Brazil, with separate flagpoles provided for each nation.

The station was renamed Cardiff Bute Road by the Great Western Railway on 1 July 1924 and given its present name in 1994.

=== Renovation of station building ===
==== Use as a railway museum ====
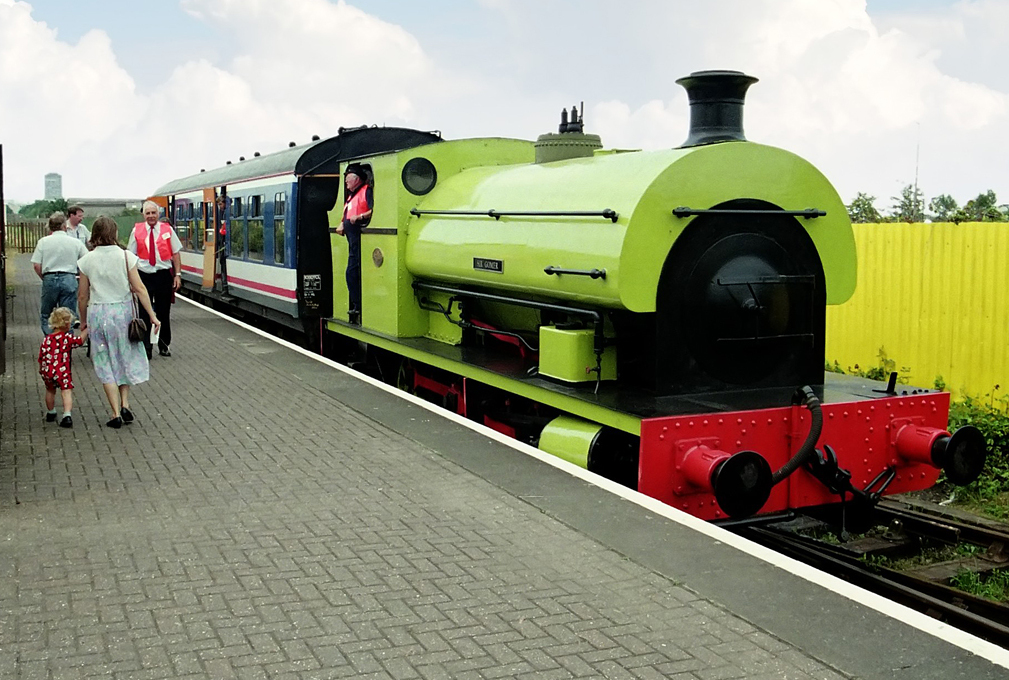
Sir Gomer operating steam train rides along the length of the platform in the early 1990s

The building was restored in the 1980s and served for a time as a railway museum under the auspices of the National Museums and Galleries of Wales and the Butetown Historical Railway Society (which in 1997 relocated its activities to the Vale of Glamorgan Railway). Following this, the station building had become derelict, with train passengers using a temporary shelter.

==== Residential and commercial property ====
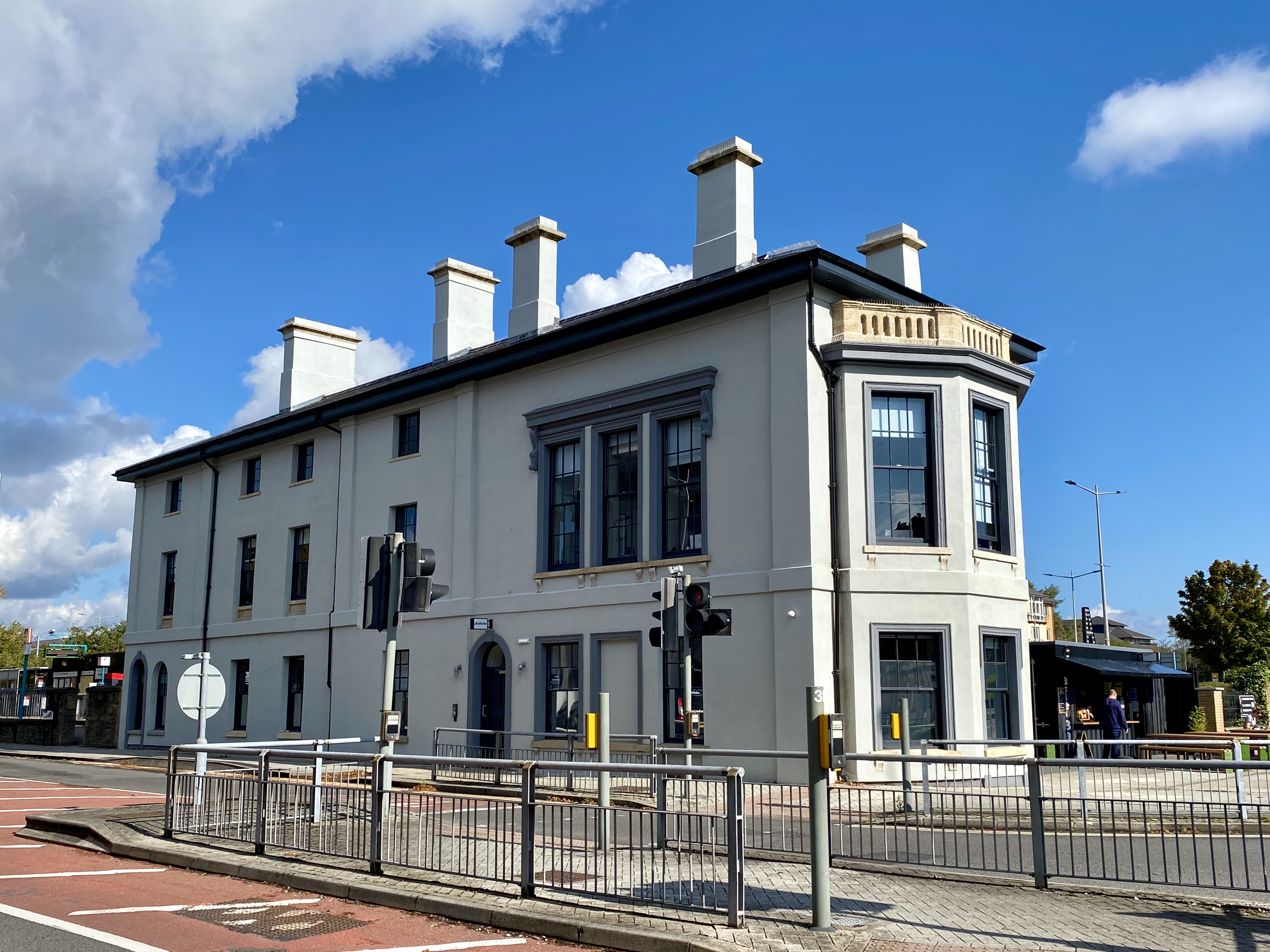
Complete restoration of the former station building (2020)

In August 2017, plans were approved to renovate and convert the derelict 1840s building, and construct a four-storey building alongside it. The new building would house 10 flats, offices and a cafe. The Victorian Society said the Bute Street station was one of the oldest and most significant railway structures in Wales and in the previous year appeared on its list of the 10 most endangered buildings. It said it supported a sensitive restoration scheme but the current proposal would cause a "high degree of harm to the building and its setting". The first stage of the development opened in June 2019.

== Services ==
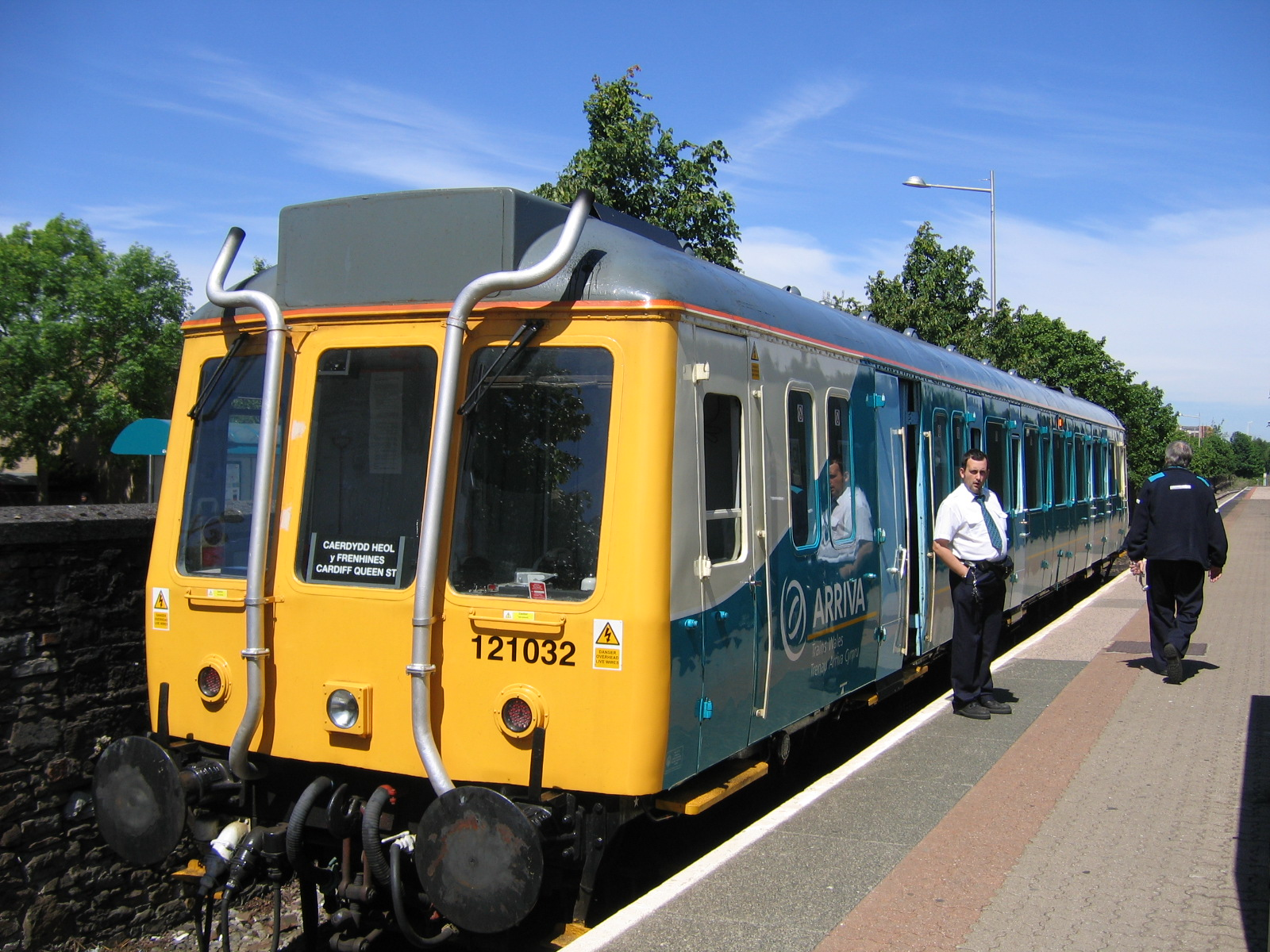
The Class 121 single-unit "bubble car" (May 2007)

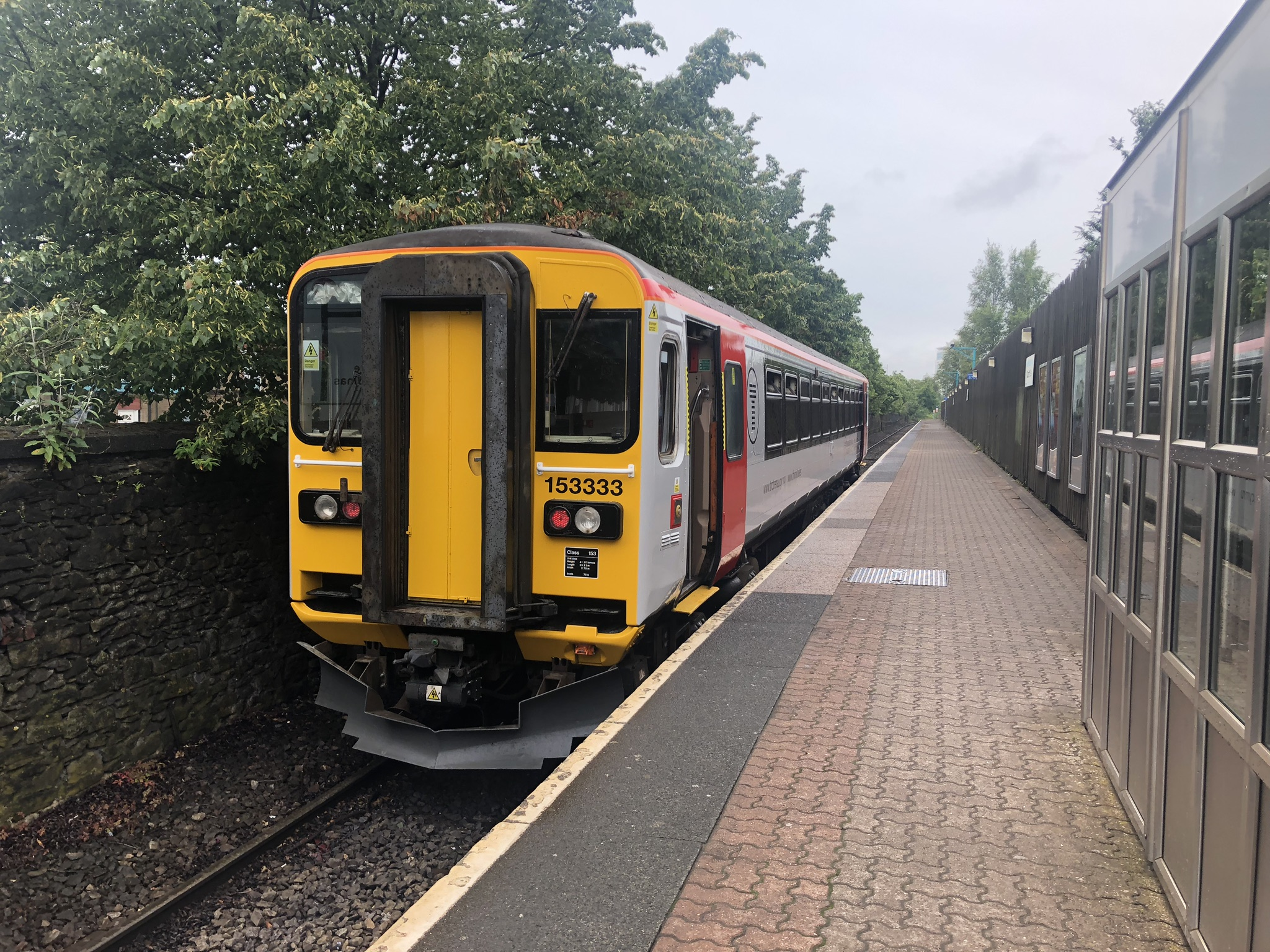
The Class 153 single-unit "super sprinter” (June 2019)

There was a shuttle service between Cardiff Queen Street and Cardiff Bay every 12 minutes Monday to Saturdays (between 0630 and 2330) and every 12 minutes on Sundays (between 1100 and 1630) using Class 153 Sprinters. Some services were operated by a Class 121 "bubble car" until it was withdrawn in June 2013.

Since the June 2024 timetable change, the trains now operates between Cardiff Bay and Pontypridd every 30 minutes and every 30 minutes from between Cardiff Bay and Cardiff Queen Street every Monday to Saturday. Sundays services operates three trains per hour between Cardiff Bay and Cardiff Queen street and one train per hour operate between Cardiff Bay and Pontypridd. These are operated with Class 150 Sprinters.

Preceding station	National Rail	Following station
Cardiff Queen Street	Transport for Wales; Butetown branch line	Terminus
	Future services	
Butetown	Transport for Wales; Butetown branch line	Terminus

== Modernisation ==
In June 2018, the then future Welsh train operating company KeolisAmey Wales announced plans to build a line extension and a terminus station, The Flourish (since renamed back to Cardiff Bay) for the Butetown Branch, along with an intermediate station at Loudoun Square. This station would have completely replaced the existing station, which would have closed.

Plans have since been revised, and in August 2022 it was proposed to construct the two-platform Loudoun Square station further to the north, and to retain Cardiff Bay station in its present location, but to add a second platform. The station will be served by more frequent tram-train vehicles from spring 2024. The line will form part of the South Wales Metro.

In September 2024 it was announced that Cardiff Bay would gain a third platform as part of Cardiff Crossrail, which would link the Butetown branch line with Cardiff Central. Work on Cardiff Crossrail is anticipated to start in Autumn 2025

== See also ==
- Clarence Road railway station
- Rail transport in Cardiff
