= Crwys Road railway station =

Proposed railway station in Wales

Coordinates: 51°29′39″N 3°10′28″W

Crwys Road Welsh: Heol y Crwys

General information
- Location: Roath, Cardiff; Wales
- Managed by: Transport for Wales
- Platforms: 2

Key dates
- April 2023: Approved
Location

Crwys Road is a proposed railway station on the Rhymney line in Cardiff, Wales, serving the Cathays and Roath districts of the city. It is planned as part of the South Wales Metro.

The station was approved in April 2023 with construction to begin later in the year. Both platforms are to have lift and ramp access. Overhead equipment will be installed in preparation for bi-mode trains. The eastern platform will be slightly longer than the western platform and will be over 90m long. The station is expected to be unstaffed.

| Preceding station | National Rail | Following station |
|---|---|---|
| Cardiff Queen Street | Transport for Wales; Rhymney line | Heath High Level |

== See also ==
- South Wales Metro
- Transport for Wales
- Proposed railway stations in Wales
- Transport in Cardiff
