= Butetown railway station =

Proposed railway station in Wales

Butetown Welsh: Tre-biwt
- View, 2026

General information
- Location: Cardiff Bay, Cardiff; Wales
- Coordinates: 51.4729°N 3.1707°W
- Manager: Transport for Wales Rail
- Platforms: 2

Other information
- Station code: BUN

Key dates
- 13 December 2026: Opening (announced)
Location

Butetown (Welsh: Tre-biwt), formerly Loudoun Square, is an under construction station in Cardiff on the Butetown branch line. It is included within the Wales & Borders franchise and will be part of the South Wales Metro.

The station was originally planned to be located next to Loudoun Square, opening by December 2023. In August 2022 it was announced that the station would be located further north opposite Maria Street, would comprise two platforms, and would now open in spring 2024. It would be served by tram-train vehicles. As of November 2026, the station remains under construction.

Preliminary work with vegetation clearance and other associated works began in January 2023, with the bulk of the main works to begin in summer 2023. At the same time, Cardiff Bay railway station began redevelopment. The vegetation works clearance is necessary for both the redoubling of the Cardiff Bay Line and installation of overhead electrical equipment for when tram-trains are introduced.

== Services ==
Preceding station	National Rail	Following station
	Future services	
Cardiff Queen Street	Transport for Wales Rail; Cardiff Bay branch line	Cardiff Bay

== See also ==
- South Wales Metro
- Proposed railway stations in Wales
- Transport in Cardiff
