= Cardiff Parkway railway station =

Proposed railway station in Wales

Coordinates: 51.5208°N 3.0783°W

Cardiff Parkway Parcffordd Caerdydd
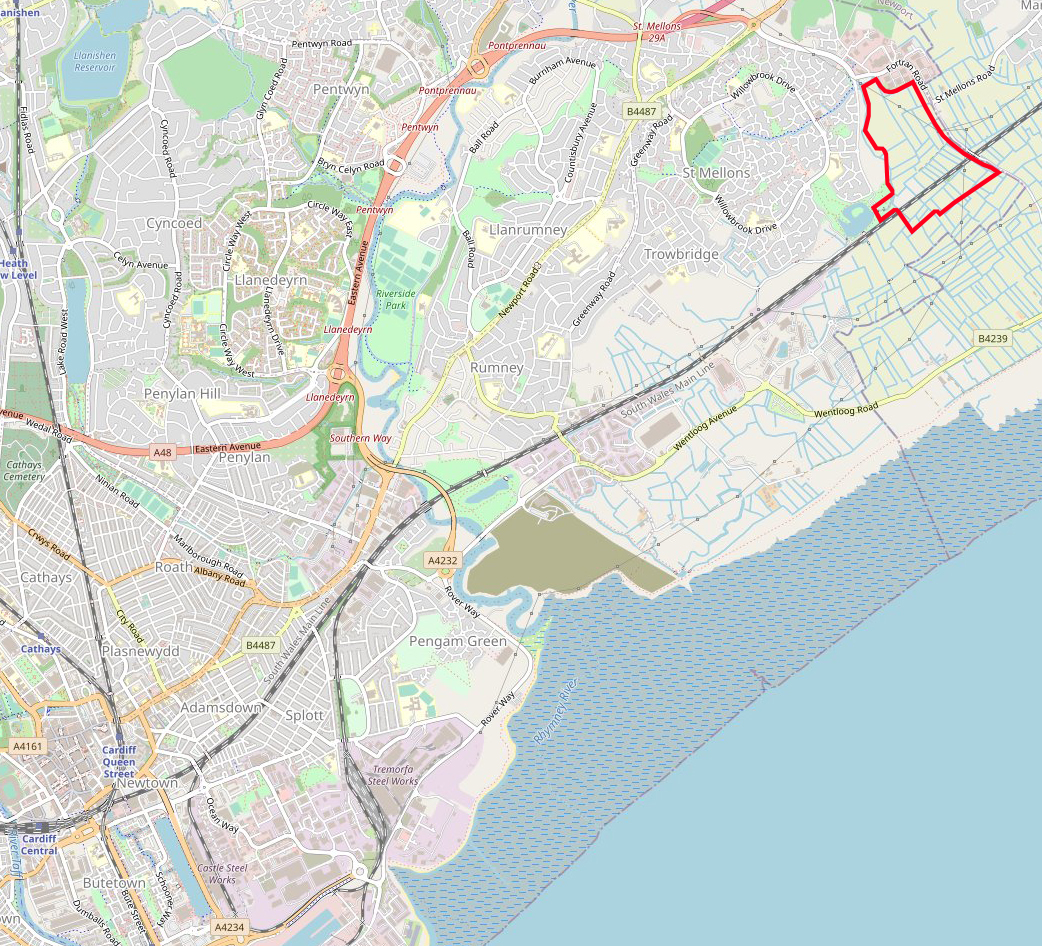
- Proposed site, outlined in red

General information
- Location: St Mellons, Cardiff; Wales
- Owner: Transport for Wales
- Manager: Transport for Wales Rail
- Platforms: 4

Key dates
- TBA: Expected opening
Location

Cardiff Parkway (Welsh: Parcffordd Caerdydd) is a planned railway station in the eastern region of Cardiff, and near to the boundary with the neighbouring city of Newport. The station is privately funded as part of the wider Cardiff Hendre Lakes business development.

== Origins ==
Cardiff Parkway Developments Ltd had applied for a station as part of the New Stations Fund 2, but it was unsuccessful. The station is to serve a new business park and would fit in with the proposed South Wales Metro. The new station is to be located south of the existing St Mellons Business Park in Cardiff.

On 13 July 2017, it was announced that the station would be privately built rather than public and would not need the same system of approval as if it was publicly built. On 19 July 2017, it was announced the station had received funding of £30 million and was due to open in February 2020. The station is expected to cost around £120m and aims to secure 8 services an hour to Cardiff and Newport, as well as mainline services to other parts of the UK, including London and Bristol.

The plans are to skew the two relief lines to the south to allow an island platform to be built in the middle of the four tracks, plus platforms on either side.

If Cardiff Parkway opens it will be the first station on the main line between Cardiff and Newport since Marshfield railway station closed in 1959.

== Construction ==
The station while first proposed in 2012 saw significant plans developed in the mid 2010s. In January 2019, it was announced that the station would open in 2022 with construction starting in 2020.

In November 2019, a four-week period of public engagement into the project was launched. Completion of the station was pushed back to 2023, subject to a planning application due in 2020. In August 2020, a report suggested construction would start the following year, and the station would open in 2024.

In December 2021 a revised timetable was published where planning permission will be sought in February 2022 with a view to construction enabling a 2024 opening.

By January no work had started and 2024 the plans were once again under consideration, by the Welsh Government. A decision had not been published by July 2024.

In January 2025, Welsh first minister Eluned Morgan approved the project, granting planning permission.

Preceding station	National Rail	Following station
	Future services	
Cardiff Central	Transport for Wales; South Wales Main Line	Newport

== See also ==
- South Wales Metro
- Transport for Wales
- Proposed railway stations in Wales
- Transport in Cardiff
