= List of proposed railway stations in Wales =

Below is a contemporary list of all major proposed railway stations in Wales.

Only stations which have been proposed by Transport for Wales and/or Network Rail, or which are state approved but private funded proposals (such as Cardiff Parkway) are shown.

== South East Wales ==
=== Cardiff area ===
- Butetown railway station – 2026
- Cardiff Parkway railway station – by 2028
- Crwys Road railway station – 2026
- Cardiff East railway station – 2028
- Ely Mill railway station – on the Welsh Government New Railway Station Prioritisation (a five station shortlist)
- Gabalfa railway station – by 2028
- Treforest Estate railway station relocation – TBA

=== Newport area ===
- Llanwern railway station - date to be confirmed
- Magor & Undy railway station - proposed reopening of the station that closed in 1964, date to be confirmed
- Newport West railway station - date to be confirmed
- Somerton - date to be confirmed

== South West Wales ==
- St Clears railway station (Carmarthenshire) – proposed reopening of the station that closed in 1964. On the Welsh Government New Railway Station Prioritisation (a five station shortlist)
- West Wales Parkway railway station (Swansea) - proposed, date to be confirmed

== Mid Wales ==
- Carno railway station (Powys) - on the Welsh Government New Railway Station Prioritisation (a five station shortlist)

== North Wales ==
=== Flintshire area ===
- Broughton railway station, Flintshire - on the 2021 Metro Development Plan by Transport for Wales and Future developments plan for the North Wales Metro
- Greenfield railway station, Flintshire (on site of former Holywell Junction railway station) - on the 2021 Metro Development Plan and Future developments plan for the North Wales Metro by Transport for Wales
- Northern Gateway railway station or Deeside Parkway railway station (Deeside) - on the Welsh Government New Railway Station Prioritisation (a five station shortlist)

=== Wrexham area ===
- Wrexham North railway station - on 2021 Metro Development Plan and Future developments plan for the North Wales Metro by Transport for Wales
- Wrexham South railway station - on 2021 Metro Development Plan and Future developments plan for the North Wales Metro by Transport for Wales

== Proposed reopening of Anglesey Central Railway line ==
=== Central Anglesey area ===
- Amlwch railway station - part of the Future developments plan for the North Wales Metro by Transport for Wales
- Gaerwen railway station - part of the Future developments plan for the North Wales Metro by Transport for Wales
- Llangefni railway station - part of an April 2019 New Rail Stations Prioritisation – Stage 2 Assessment Report, by the Welsh Government, likely part of any reopening of ACR.

== See also ==
- List of proposed railway stations in England
- List of proposed railway stations in Scotland
- South Wales Metro
- North Wales Metro
