= Cardiff East railway station =

Proposed railway station in Wales

Cardiff East

General information
- Location: Cardiff; Wales
- Managed by: Transport for Wales

Cardiff East is a proposed railway station in Cardiff, Wales, which will serve the eastern districts of the city. It is planned as part of the South Wales Metro. Construction is scheduled to begin in late 2026.

== See also ==
- South Wales Metro
- Transport for Wales
- Proposed railway stations in Wales
- Transport in Cardiff
