= Llanwern railway station =

Former railway station in Wales

Coordinates: 51.58175°N 2.916967°W

Llanwern

General information
- Location: Llanwern, Newport; Wales
- Platforms: 2

Other information
- Status: Disused

History
- Original company: South Wales Railway
- Pre-grouping: Great Western Railway
- Post-grouping: Great Western Railway

Key dates
- 1850: Opened
- 12 September 1960: Closed to passengers
- 16 April 1961: Closed to all traffic
Location

Llanwern railway station is a former station serving Llanwern on the east side of the city of Newport.

== History ==
It was opened with the South Wales Railway in 1850 and closed to passengers on 12 September 1960 in preparation for the building of Llanwern steelworks. It was closed completely on 16 April 1961.

The Newport City Council unitary development plan and Sewta rail strategy plan both planned for the station to be re-opened at the same time as the main line was re-signalled by 2012. Station reopening was subsequently postponed.

== Recent developments ==
After the closure of the steelworks, and the construction of housing on the site, Llanwern seems likely to be under consideration for some part in a broader Severnside Parkway scheme, to relieve the pressure of commuter traffic and its parking on the village of Rogiet and Severn Tunnel Junction. It would be situated to the north of the Glan Llyn regeneration site, and could have 1,000 car park spaces.

Planning permission has been requested in 2019 by Transport for Wales as part of their preliminary plans for a major events stabling line at the site. The line will be used to situate infrastructure close to demand for major occasions such as Millennium Stadium events in Cardiff, but also serve as a line for testing new Construcciones y Auxiliar de Ferrocarriles trains for Transport for Wales, to be manufactured at the nearby Celtic Springs Business Park factory. The larger scheme, including the railway station and car park, will be submitted in a later application.

Preceding station	Future services	Following station
Somerton	Transport for Wales; South Wales Main Line	Magor & Undy

== See also ==
- Railway stations in Newport
- South Wales Metro
- Transport for Wales
