= Newport railway station =

Railway station in Newport, Wales

Newport Welsh: Casnewydd
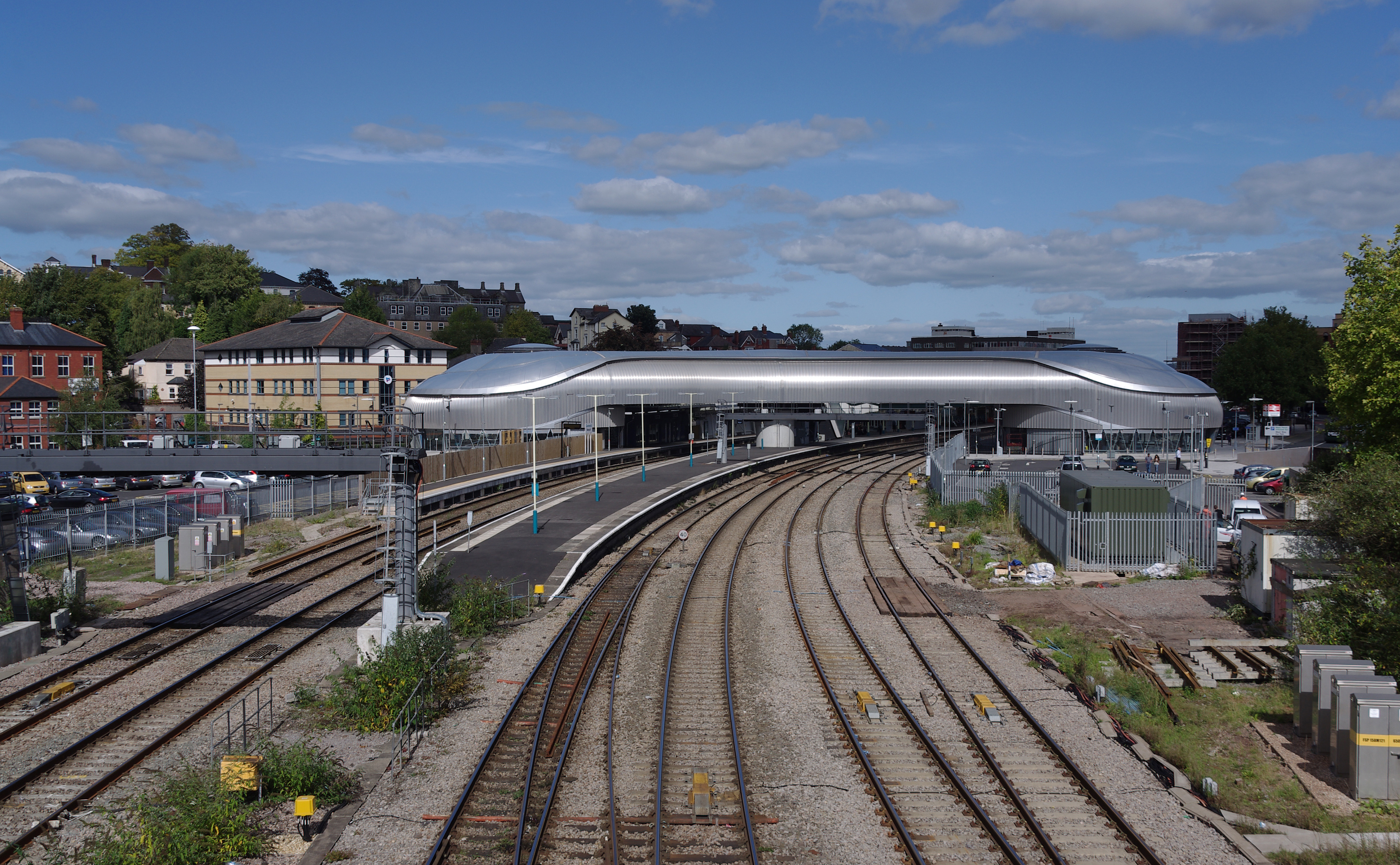
- Newport railway station looking eastbound.

General information
- Location: Newport, Wales; Wales
- Coordinates: 51.5888°N 3.0004°W
- Grid reference: ST 307 882
- Manager: Transport for Wales Rail
- Platforms: 4

Other information
- Station code: NWP
- Classification: DfT category B

Key dates
- 18 June 1850: Opened
- 1880: Enlarged
- 1928: Enlarged
- 2010: Enlarged

Passengers
- 2021/22: ▲1.754 million
- Interchange: ▲0.300 million
- 2022/23: ▲2.340 million
- Interchange: ▲0.478 million
- 2023/24: ▲2.719 million
- Interchange: ▲0.538 million
- 2024/25: ▲2.817 million
- Interchange: ▲0.563 million
- 2025/26: ▲2.863 million
- Interchange: ▲0.607 million
Location
Notes
- Passenger statistics from the Office of Rail and Road

Newport (Welsh: Gorsaf Rheilffordd Casnewydd) is the second-busiest railway station in Wales (after Cardiff Central). It is situated in Newport city centre and is 133 miles 13 chains (214.3 km) from London Paddington measured via Bristol Parkway, and 158 miles 50 chains (255.3 km) via Stroud.

The station was originally opened in 1850 by the South Wales Railway Company and was greatly expanded in 1928. A new station building was built in 2010, with four full-size platforms to facilitate new Great Western Railway 10-car Intercity Express Programme trains.

The station is owned by Network Rail and managed by Transport for Wales Rail. The main station entrance is located on Queensway, connected by Station Approach to the High Street; there is a further entrance adjoined to the National Car Parks site at its rear, reached from Devon Place.

== History ==
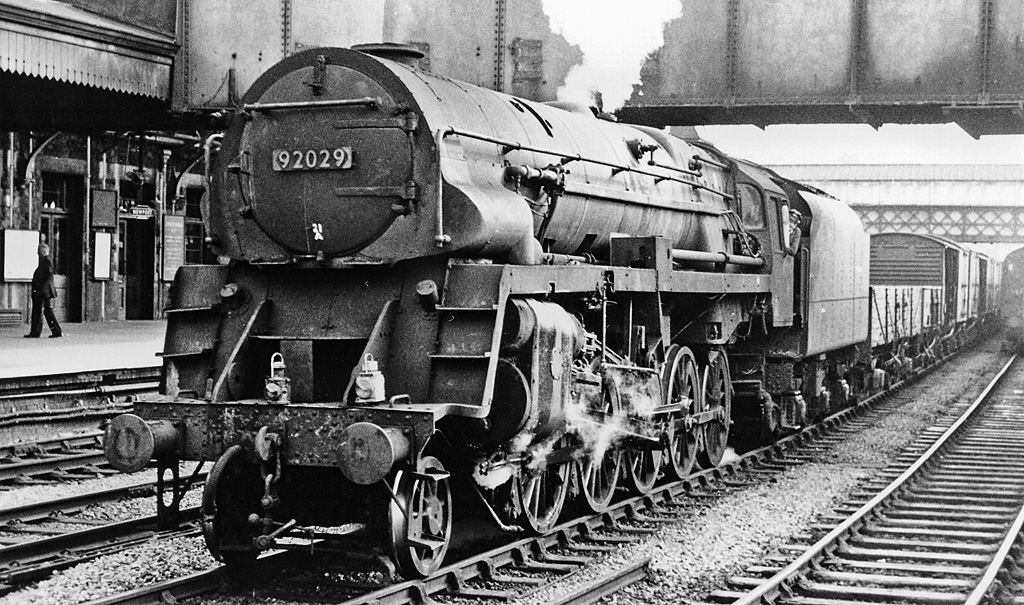
Up freight in 1963

The current station layout consists of four through-platforms numbered 1 to 4 from the south side. The original broad gauge station had only two 200-foot-long (61 m) through platforms and a bay platform at the east end of the down platform. The Hillfield railway tunnels to the west of the station were dug under Stow Hill in the 1840s. On the closure of Dock Street and Mill Street stations to passengers in 1880, High Street station was greatly expanded: The up platform was made into an island - the north face 825 feet (251 m) in length, and the south side 814 feet (248 m). The down platform was extended to 897 feet (273 m), with the west end bay extended to 428 feet (130 m). Two scissors crossovers were provided on these new platforms, effectively dividing them into two. The original down platform became Nos. 1 and 2. The bay became No. 3, the south face of the up platform Nos. 4 and 5 and the north face Nos. 6 and 7. The bay platform was mostly used for Monmouthshire western valleys services, but with the quadrupling of the line in 1912 trains from the bay platform (on the south side) now had to cross the entire station to get to the Gaer Tunnel on the north side. To address this the former loading dock on the north side of the station was made into a passenger platform (No. 8).

April 1961 saw the introduction of colour Multiple-Aspect Signalling and associated modifications to the station layout. The north face of the island platform became the new up platform, with the south face becoming the new down. The platforms were also renumbered in the opposite direction to match the new line designations — No. 8 became No. 1, Nos. 6/7 became 2, Nos. 4/5 became No. 5 and Nos. 1/2 became No. 6. Lines 3 and 4 became the designations for the through non-platform lines. Subsequent removal of the scissors crossovers saw a further combination and renumbering of platforms to the current layout.

=== Name ===
Originally named Newport High Street, the suffix High Street became unnecessary on the closure of Mill Street and Dock Street stations to goods traffic in the 1960s. Printed tickets and National Rail enquiries use the suffix "South Wales" to differentiate this station from its namesake in Essex. In 2007 the Newport Unlimited urban regeneration company proposed the station be renamed Newport City railway station; however, this suggestion was not taken up.

== Accidents and incidents ==
- On 19 August 1938, a passenger train was sent into a siding due to a signalman's error. It crashed through the buffers but the locomotive stopped short of falling into the River Usk.

== Facilities ==
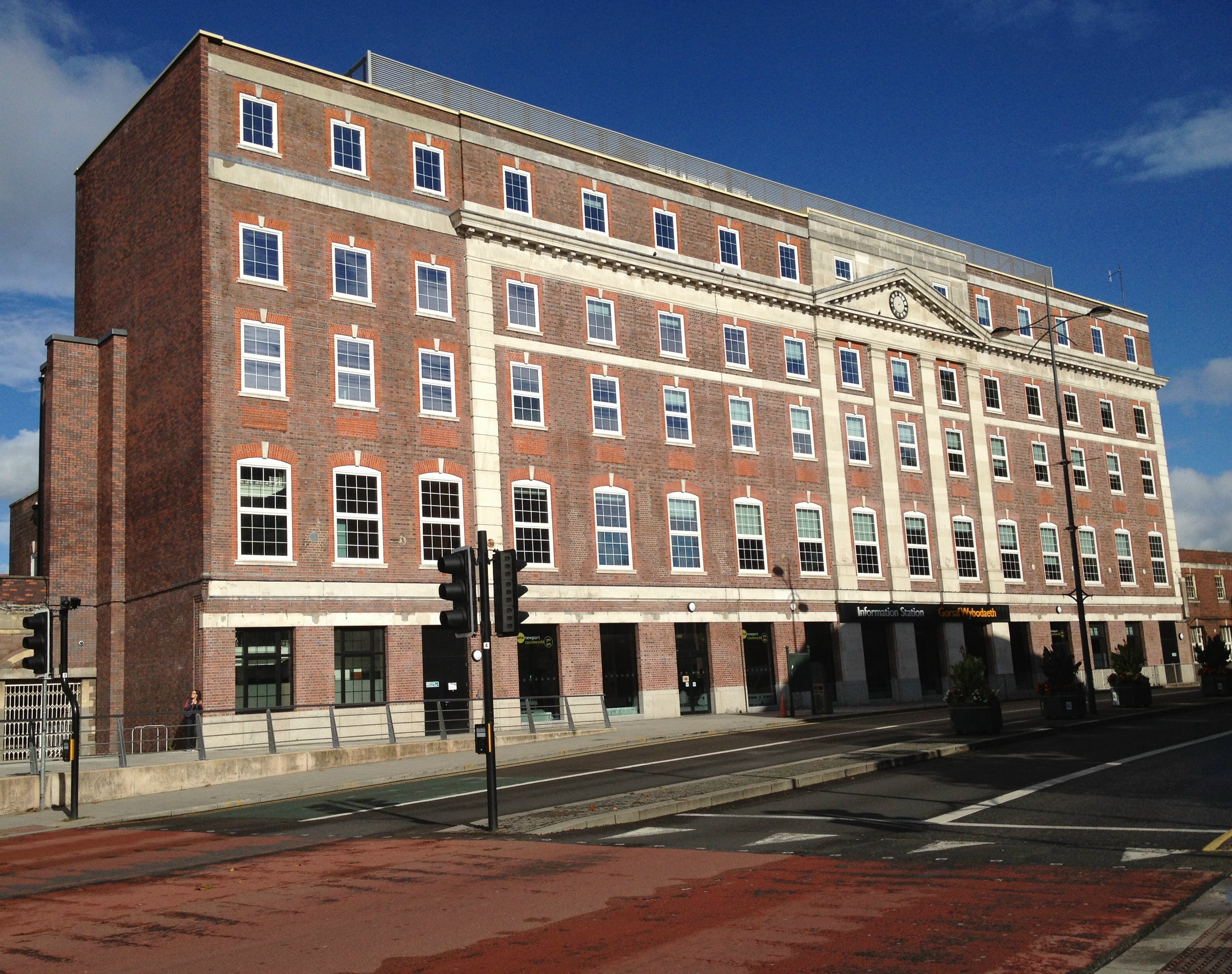
Exterior of the old concourse, converted to offices in 2011

Platform 1 is only mainly used for westbound services to Cardiff Central during peak times. Platform 2 is usually the stopping point for all westbound services to Cardiff Central. Platform 3 is usually the stopping point for eastbound services to London Paddington and Nottingham. Platform 4 is usually the stopping point for eastbound services to Manchester Piccadilly, Holyhead, Portsmouth Harbour, Taunton and Cheltenham Spa and is also used by trains to Ebbw Vale following the full re-opening of the Ebbw Valley Railway.

A British Transport Police station is situated on platform 1 and a branch of WH Smith runs from a kiosk on platform 2. The waiting room and customer toilets are situated between platforms 2 and 3, as was the Upper Crust café (Now closed). Also between platforms 2 and 3 is a customer help desk. The booking hall is situated between the main entrance and platform 1. There are three main windows for tickets for immediate travel and a travel centre which handles enquiries, complaints and issues tickets for future travel. In the booking hall there is also a vending machine and automatic ticket machines. Wheelchair access between platforms is provided via a bridge, accessed by a lift from the platforms. There is a short-stay car park and taxi rank situated to the front and a long-stay car park to the rear which is accessible via a footbridge from all platforms. Since October 2005, automatic ticket barriers have been installed. At the same time, the ticket barriers are being used more often, before used during peak periods and match days, now staffed throughout the day until late in the evening.

=== 2007 development ===
The Welsh Government and Network Rail agreed a £20 million makeover for the station that provided two new concourses, a second pedestrian bridge over the tracks and a user-friendly bus-rail interchange at the station. The plans also included an extended platform 4 capable of accommodating up to twelve-carriage intercity trains and a new multi-storey car park for long-stay travellers. The initial redevelopment of Platform 4 did not allow for disabled access, resulting in station staff using a locally contracted taxi firm at £3 a passenger to move disabled and elderly passengers the half-mile from one side of the station to the other, in a complimentary service provision. The first phase, platform 4 extension, was completed on 2 July 2007, with design works completed by Atkins.

=== 2009 development ===
Planned to enable the station to cope with passenger traffic associated with the 2010 Ryder Cup, a second passenger bridge was built linking the whole station with a lift for all platforms. Network Rail claimed accessibility and safety are at the heart of the new design.

The new bridge is clad in ethylene tetrafluoroethylene (ETFE), the material which protects the Eden Project in Cornwall. The station enhancements were engineered by Atkins Engineers, based in Exeter and Swindon, with design support from Grimshaw Architects and Vector Foiltec working as sub-consultants. The new north and south concourses opened on 13 September 2010.

The development was criticised by RAIL magazine columnist Barry Doe for being at the wrong end of the station, a lack of seating and generally poor design. The station was nominated in 2011 for the Carbuncle Cup, awarded for the ugliest building of the year.

Arriva Trains Wales had expressed concern about a leaking roof, an inadequate customer service area and insufficient ticket gates. Network Rail said the roof was fixed in mid-May 2011, but issues had resumed in 2013. Transport for Wales acquired the management of the station in 2018 and are replacing station infrastructure across the network.

=== Subsequent developments ===
The whole Newport area was re-signalled from 2009 to 2012, providing speed improvements on the relief lines.

The Great Western Main Line from London to Cardiff was electrified as part of the Great Western Main Line electrification scheme. As part of this the former footbridge was removed in 2017. Following the introduction of Hitachi Rail British Rail Class 800/802 trains and the new timetable introduced on 15 December 2019, journey times between Newport and London Paddington were reduced to around 1 hour 30 minutes The power from Bristol Parkway through Newport was switched on on 14 September 2019, with electric running extended to Newport from 15 December, and as far as Cardiff over the Christmas period.

In September 2018, plans were submitted to Newport City Council for a new footbridge between Devon Place and Queensway, to replace the subway used since the closure of the previous footbridge. The bridge opened in April 2023.

The South East Wales Transport Alliance (SEWTA) have proposed an additional service (one in every two hours) to Abergavenny with a re-opened station in Caerleon, two trains per hour between Cwmbran and Abergavenny, and an hourly service to Pontypool and New Inn, subject to line enhancements in Abergavenny.

Transport for Wales have included some of these proposals in their plans for the later stages of their South Wales Metro scheme.

== Services ==
As at February 2019, the station is a calling point for GWR (who provide most of the services), as well as Transport for Wales Rail and CrossCountry.

In December 2022, the ORR approved Grand Union to commence a new service from Paddington to Carmarthen in partnership with Spanish rail operator Renfe, for which a fleet of new bi-mode trains was to be used. The new service, with trains calling at Bristol Parkway, Severn Tunnel Junction, Newport, Cardiff Central, Gowerton and Llanelli en route to Carmarthen, was originally scheduled to commence in December 2024, but is now expected to begin in December 2027. In December 2024, following FirstGroup's acquisition of Grand Union Trains, it was announced the proposed London Paddington to Carmarthen service would be operated by Lumo.

=== Transport for Wales Rail ===
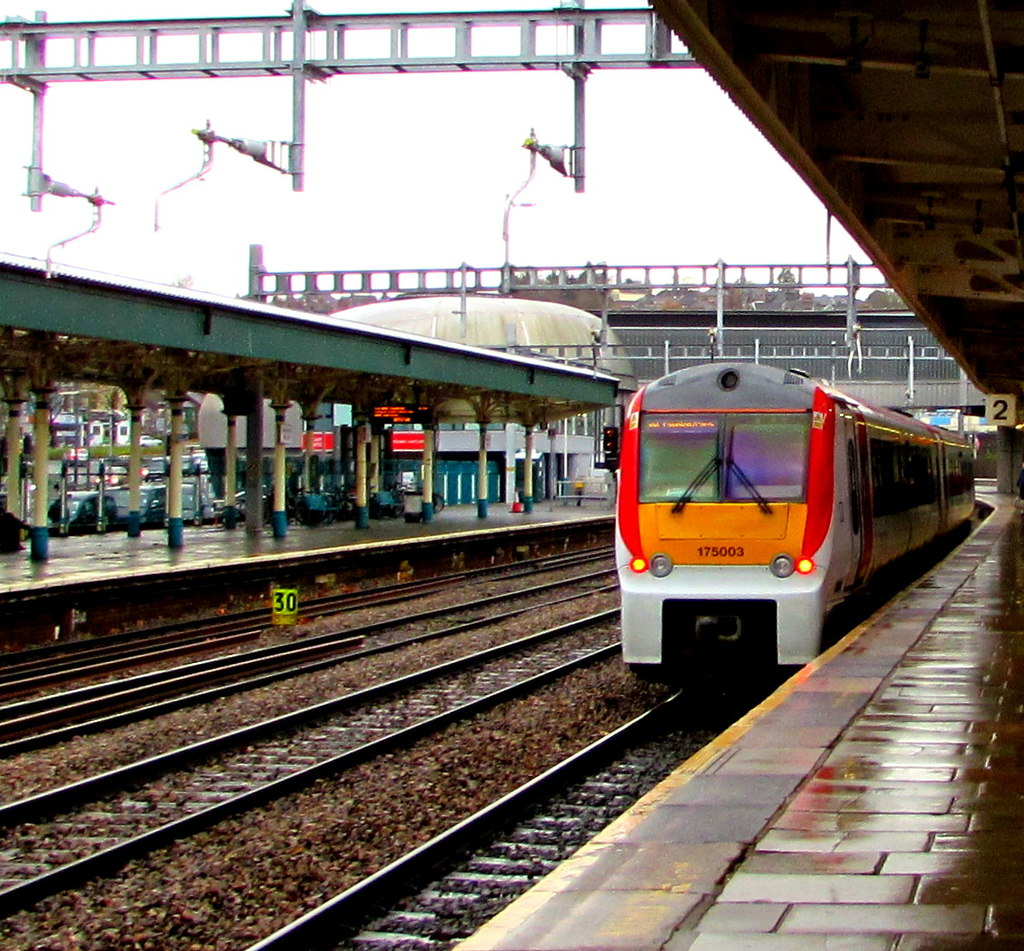
A Transport for Wales Rail service

- 1 train per hour (tph) to Manchester Piccadilly via Hereford, Shrewsbury and Crewe. These services are from Carmarthen, Milford Haven or Cardiff Central, operated by Class 197 Civity units and Class 67 locomotives with Mark 4 carriages.
- 1tph to Carmarthen via Cardiff Central, Bridgend, Port Talbot Parkway, Neath, Swansea, Llanelli and Pembrey and Burry Port. These services are from Manchester Piccadilly. These services are operated by Class 197 Civity units.
- 1tp2h to Holyhead via Hereford, Shrewsbury, Wrexham General, Chester, Llandudno Junction and Bangor. These services are operated by Class 197 Civity units, except for one daily service formed of a Class 67 locomotive with Mark 4 carriages.
- 1tph to Cardiff Central only, from Holyhead or Manchester. These services are operated by Class 197 Civity units and Class 67 locomotives with Mark 4 carriages.
- 1tph to Cheltenham Spa via Severn Tunnel Junction and Gloucester, usually starting from Maesteg but sometimes Cardiff Central. operated by Class 150 Sprinter units, Class 153 Super Sprinter units and Class 158 Express Sprinter units.
- 1tph to Maesteg via Cardiff Central and Bridgend. These services originate from Cheltenham Spa. These are operated by Class 150 Sprinter units, Class 153 Super Sprinter units and Class 158 Express Sprinter units.
- 1tph to Ebbw Vale Town via the Ebbw Valley Railway, operated by Class 150 Sprinter units and Class 153 Super Sprinter units.

In October 2008 the Welsh Government announced the launch of a new faster services between Cardiff and North Wales. The service was first operated by Class 57 locomotives and Mark 2 passenger rolling stock. The Premier Service has premier business-class accommodation. In March 2012 the service was upgraded to Class 67 locomotives and Mark 3 rolling stock, and the Mark 3 sets were in turn replaced by Mark 4 sets.

After securing the Wales & Borders franchise in 2018, Transport for Wales announced that services between Newport and Ebbw Vale would reopen by 2021. On 12 December 2021, the service began to Crosskeys, with the full service to Ebbw Vale Town beginning in February 2024.

=== CrossCountry ===
- 1tph to Nottingham via Gloucester, Cheltenham Spa, Birmingham New Street and Derby. These services are from Cardiff Central, operated by Class 170 Turbostar units.
- 1tph to Cardiff Central. These services are usually from Nottingham or Birmingham New Street.

=== Great Western Railway ===
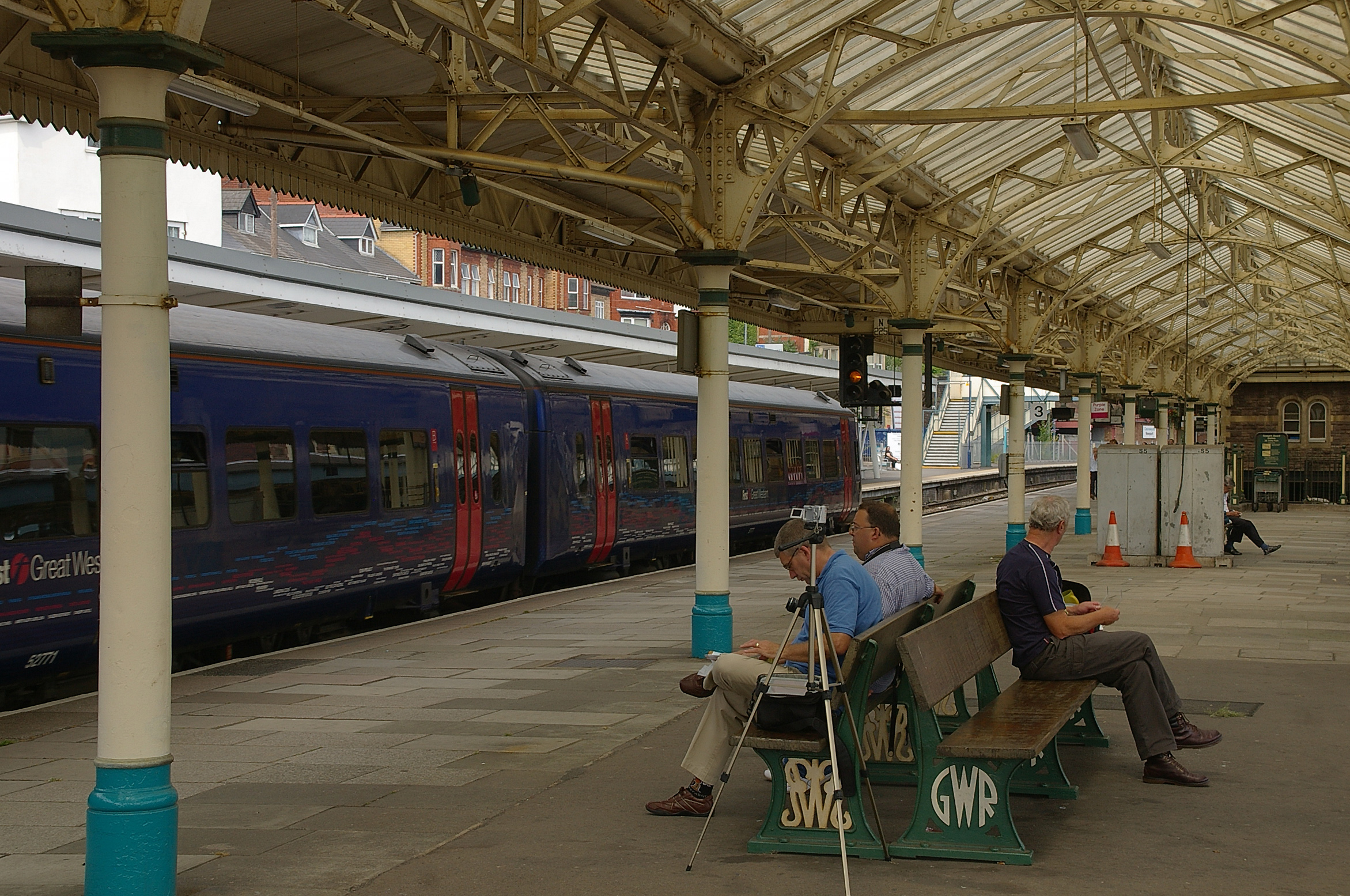
A Class 158 arrives at Newport with a First Great Western service to Portsmouth Harbour with the two different styles of GWR logo on the benches

- 2tph to London Paddington via Bristol Parkway, Swindon, Didcot Parkway and Reading. These services are from Cardiff Central, Swansea or Carmarthen, operated by Class 800s and Class 802s, as well as one daily Class 387, which is the only entirely electric-powered stock to serve the station.
- 1tph to Swansea via Cardiff Central, Bridgend, Port Talbot Parkway, Neath and Swansea. Every two hours, services continue to Llanelli, Pembrey and Burry Port and Carmarthen. Limited services on summer Saturdays only continue further towards Pembroke Dock. These services are from London Paddington, operated by Class 800s and Class 802s.
- 3tph to Cardiff Central only. These services are from London Paddington, Portsmouth Harbour or Taunton. Some Taunton services start back from Plymouth or Penzance. Trains from London and Taunton are operated by Class 800s and Class 802s, and trains from Portsmouth are operated by Class 158s, Class 165s and Class 166s.
- 1tph to Portsmouth Harbour via Bristol Temple Meads, Bath Spa, Westbury, Warminster, Salisbury, Romsey, Southampton Central, Fareham, Cosham, Fratton and Portsmouth & Southsea. These services are from Cardiff Central, operated by Class 158s, Class 165s and Class 166s.
- 1tph to Taunton via Bristol Temple Meads and Weston-super-Mare. Approximately every two hours, services continue onto Plymouth and Penzance via Exeter St. David's. These services are from Cardiff Central, operated by Class 800s and Class 802s, plus limited Class 158s on Sundays.

Preceding station	National Rail	Following station
Cardiff Central	Transport for Wales; Maesteg / Cardiff Central - Cheltenham Spa	Severn Tunnel Junction
Cardiff Central	Transport for Wales; Milford Haven/Carmarthen - Manchester Piccadilly	Cwmbran
Cardiff Central	Transport for Wales; Cardiff - Holyhead	Cwmbran
Pye Corner	Transport for Wales; Ebbw Vale Town - Newport	Terminus
Cardiff Central	CrossCountry; Cardiff Central - Nottingham	Severn Tunnel Junction
Cardiff Central	CrossCountry; Cardiff Central - Nottingham	Chepstow
Cardiff Central	Great Western Railway; Cardiff Central / Swansea - London Paddington	Bristol Parkway
Cardiff Central	Great Western Railway; Cardiff Central - Taunton	Severn Tunnel Junction
Cardiff Central	Great Western Railway; Cardiff Central - Portsmouth Harbour	Filton Abbey Wood
	Future services	
Cardiff Central	Lumo; London - Carmarthen	Severn Tunnel Junction
Cardiff East	Transport for Wales; Maesteg / Cardiff Central - Cheltenham Spa	Somerton
Cardiff East	TBC; Cardiff - Bristol stopping service	Somerton

== Media ==
in 2020, the Rail Delivery Group nominated Newport as one of the Welsh stations as a contender for the World Cup of Stations. However, it did not pass the group stages.

== See also ==
- Railway stations in Newport
- Pontypool, Caerleon and Newport Railway
- Pontypridd, Caerphilly and Newport Railway
- List of railway stations in Wales

== Bibliography ==
- South Wales Main Line - Newport ISBN 1-874103-76-3
