= South Wales Main Line =

Railway from Bristol to Swansea

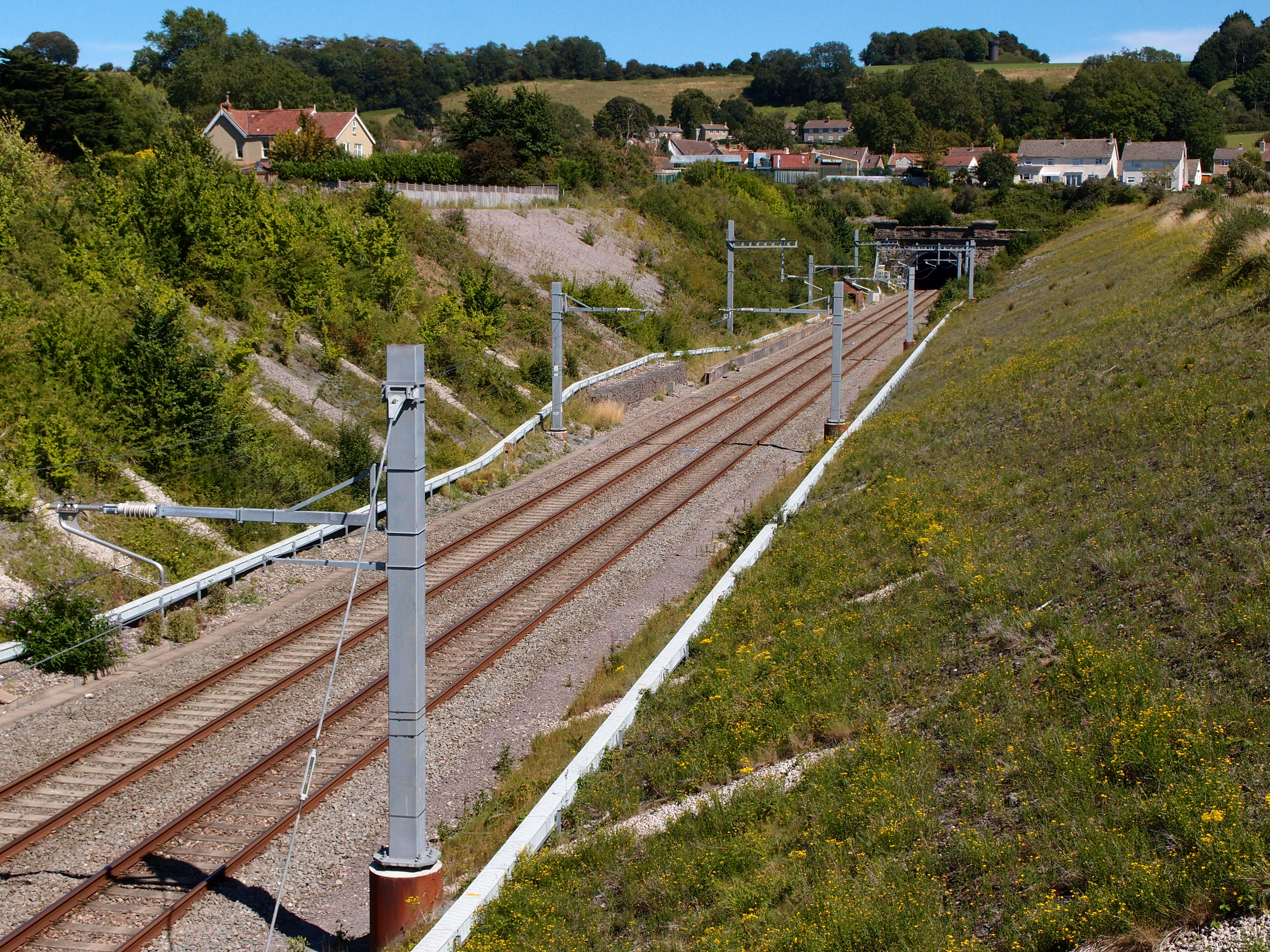
- The entrance to the Chipping Sodbury Tunnel with the newly electrified overhead line equipment

Overview
- Status: Operational
- Owner: Network Rail
- Locale: South Wales; South West England
- Stations: 18

Service
- Type: Heavy rail
- System: National Rail
- Operators: Transport for Wales; CrossCountry; Great Western Railway

History
- Opened: 1850; 176 years ago (Chepstow–Swansea); 1903; 123 years ago (Swindon–Patchway)

Technical
- Line length: 84 miles 30 chains (135.79 km)
- Number of tracks: Mainly double track, though quadruple track from Severn Tunnel Junction via Newport to Cardiff Central.
- Character: Main line
- Track gauge: 4 ft 8 1/2 in (1,435 mm) standard gauge
- Electrification: 25 kV 50 Hz AC OHLE (London Paddington to Cardiff Central)
- Operating speed: Up to 125 mph (201 km/h) in England; Up to 100 mph (161 km/h) in Wales
Route map
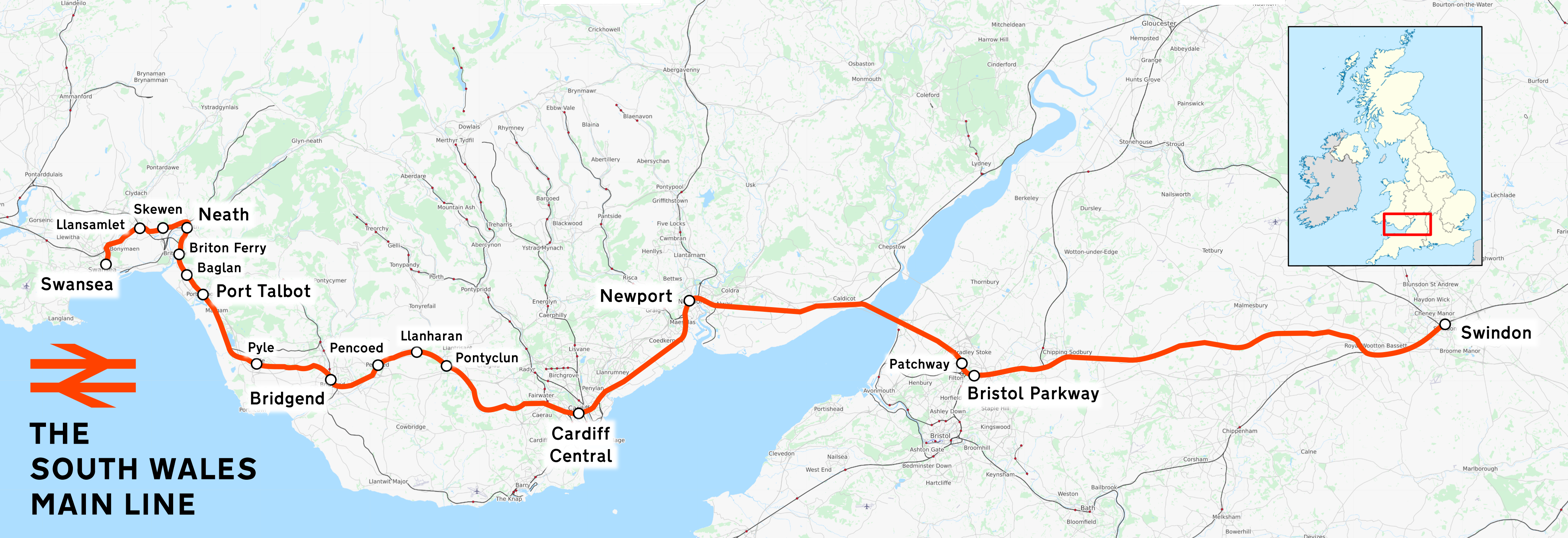
(Click to expand)

The South Wales Main Line (Welsh: Prif Linell De Cymru), originally known as the London, Bristol and South Wales Direct Railway or simply as the Bristol and South Wales Direct Railway, is a branch of the Great Western Main Line in Great Britain. It diverges from the core London-Bristol line at Royal Wootton Bassett beyond Swindon, first calling at Bristol Parkway, after which the line continues through the Severn Tunnel into South Wales.

Much of the South Wales Main Line was built between the 1830s and 1886; originally trains to and from destinations in England ran via Chepstow, Gloucester and Stroud, joining the Great Western Main Line at Swindon. A more direct route was challenging yet desirable, leading to the construction of the line's most prominent civil engineering feature, the Severn Tunnel. Completed in 1886, it permitted a significant reduction in journey times between various destinations, especially after the construction of the Badminton Line in 1903. During the British Rail era, the line was incorporated into the Western Region and steam locomotives were replaced by diesel locomotives, such as the Intercity 125 high speed trainsets. During the 2010s, the line between Swindon and Cardiff Central was electrified using the 25 kV AC overhead system as part of the wider electrification of the Great Western Main Line; this has permitted the operation of electric traction between Cardiff and London for the first time to commence in 2020.

Presently, Great Western Railway operates Hitachi Rail-built Intercity Express trains (Class 800 and 802) on the line between South Wales, London and South West England. CrossCountry provides services from Cardiff to Nottingham via Severn Tunnel Junction and thence the Gloucester to Newport Line via Gloucester and Birmingham. Transport for Wales operates services between South Wales and North Wales via the English Midlands on the line. Operations are mostly managed from the Wales Rail Operating Centre in Cardiff; digital signalling is to be rolled out.

== History ==
The South Wales Railway was built to carry traffic from Gloucester to the strategic port of Milford Haven and capture the lucrative transatlantic maritime trade as well as communication with Ireland. At Gloucester, the South Wales Railway met with the Great Western Railway (GWR) which formed a route between London and South Wales after the opening of Brunel's Chepstow Railway Bridge in 1852. The original route of the GWR left the Bristol-bound Great Western Main Line at Swindon, proceeding via Stroud, Gloucester and Chepstow before rejoining the present line at Severn Tunnel Junction; this circular route gave rise to the nickname 'Great Way Round'.

GWR officials realised that the journey time between the South Wales Main Line and the Great Western Main Line could be significantly shortened by the construction of a tunnel directly underneath the River Severn, which would be faster than the ferry service between Portskewett, Monmouthshire and New Passage, Gloucestershire. During the early 1870s, GWR's chief engineer, Sir John Hawkshaw, developed his design for what would become the Severn Tunnel and the company obtained the Severn Tunnel Railway Act 1872 (35 & 36 Vict. c. liii) on 27 June 1872 that authorised the construction of the tunnel. The tunnel's construction was time consuming and disrupted by water infiltration, yet proceeded nonetheless.

The completed tunnel was opened to regular goods trains during September 1886; the first passenger train followed on 1 December 1886. The opening of a more direct route to and from South Wales led to trains from Swindon to Newport and beyond being thereafter routed via Bath, Bristol and the tunnel.

The route used today was established in 1903 with the building of what is often known as the Badminton Line. This involved the construction of about 33 miles (53 km) of new track, and tunnels at Alderton and Sodbury. The new line left the Bath line beyond Swindon at what is now Royal Wootton Bassett, rejoining the earlier route north of Bristol near Patchway. Not only did this provide a more direct route for traffic to and from South Wales, the gradients were easier for coal trains to negotiate, and it was thought that the line would be a boost to what was, at the time of building, the expanding port of Fishguard. This was the GWR's connection with trans-Atlantic ocean liner departures.

During the British Rail era, the line was incorporated into the Western Region and steam locomotives were replaced by diesel locomotives. Perhaps the most significant change occurred in 1976 in the form of the Intercity 125, a new high speed train fleet that regularly ran at speeds of up to 125 mph (201 km/h) that was first introduced in the Western Region. The Intercity 125 would remain in use into the twenty-first century and marked a considerable improvement in service.

In 2005, the Strategic Rail Authority produced a Route Utilisation Strategy for the Great Western Main Line in 2005 to propose ways of meeting increased traffic levels. Network Rail's 2007 Business Plan included the provision of extra platform capacity at Cardiff Central, Newport and Bristol Parkway, together with resignalling and line speed improvements in South Wales, most of which would be delivered in 2010–2014.

=== Electrification ===
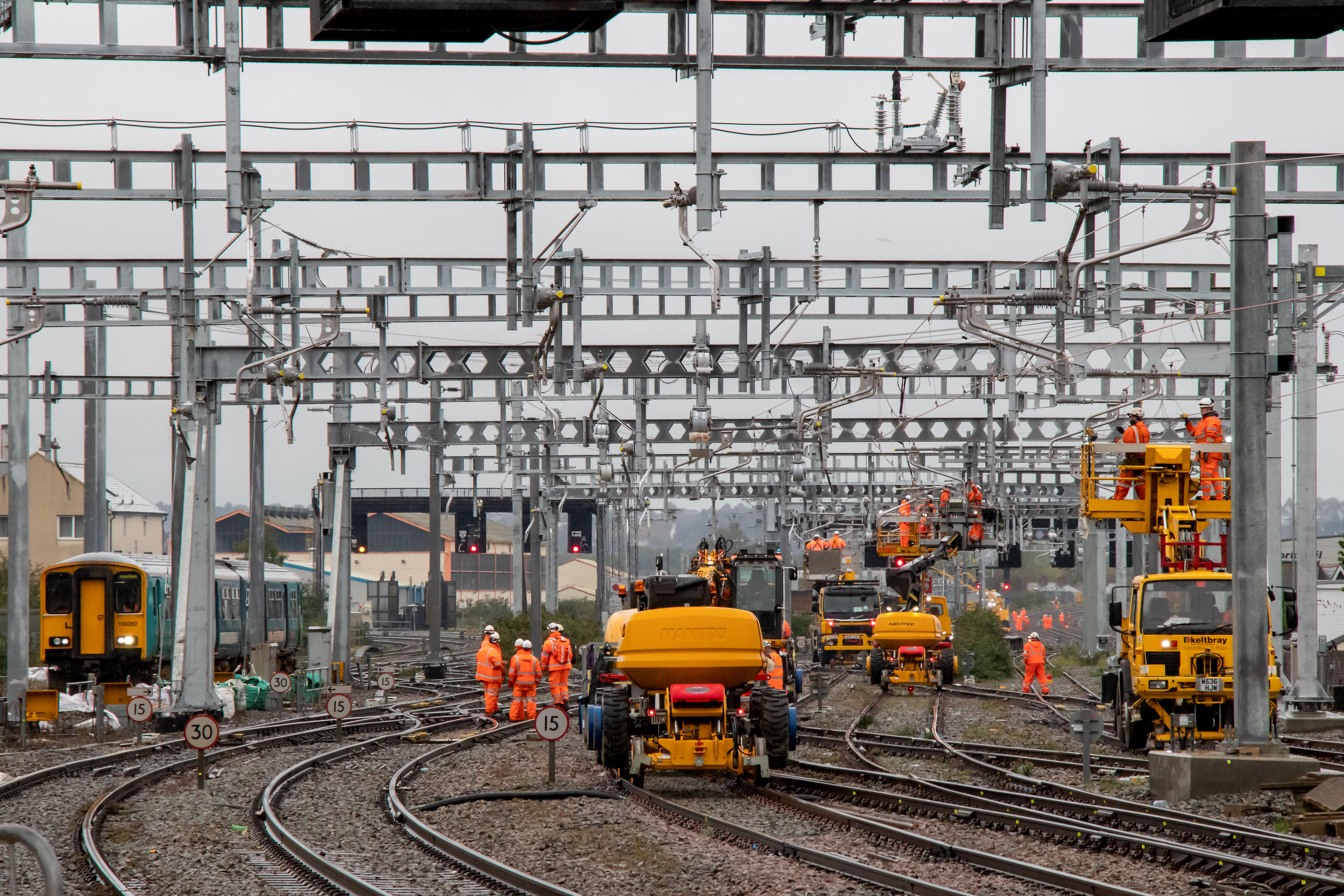
Electrification work at Cardiff Central in October 2019

The South Wales Main Line was one of the last of the major inter-city routes in Great Britain to remain un-electrified. In 2012, the British government announced it would proceed with work to electrify the South Wales Main Line as part of a wider scheme of electrification on the Great Western Main Line. The line from London to Cardiff was fully electrified by Christmas 2019, the first electric trains began operating through the Severn Tunnel in June 2020. The electrification was originally intended to reach Swansea, but this was cancelled in July 2017.

The Hitachi Super Express trains bought for Great Western inter-city services are predominantly electric units, but a portion of the fleet are dual power source electro-diesel bi-mode trains, which enabled services to operate before line electrification is complete. The bi-mode trains will allow inter-city services to continue to operate from London all the way to Carmarthen in the future. The Super Express trains were expected to bring an estimated 15% increase in capacity during the morning peak hours. Electrification cut journey times between Swansea and London by an estimated 20 minutes, although electrification will not extend west of Cardiff to Swansea, Carmarthen or Pembroke Dock, and services on the line to Brighton, Portsmouth Harbour and Taunton will continue to be operated by diesel trains, as the Bristol to Exeter Line and the Wessex Main Line will not be electrified.

In 2026 the Severn Tunnel was closed for 16 days to allow for the replacement of the overhead wiring. The new wiring is a single copper contact wire, and is designed to have a higher resistance to bimetallic corrosion. This is necessary due to the high levels of moisture and saltwater that pass through the Severn Tunnel, which drastically reduced the lifespan of the old electrical equipment.

=== Future proposals ===
There are currently proposals to upgrade the relief lines on the South Wales Main line between Cardiff Central and Severn Tunnel Junction. Although this section of the line has four tracks, the relief lines have a maximum operating speed of only 40 mph (65 km/h) and are primarily used for freight services. The upgrade would allow for additional passenger services, and is part of a broader plan to introduce new stations between Cardiff and Severn Tunnel Junction. These stations, from east to west, are as follows:

- Magor and Undy
- Llanwern
- Somerton
- Newport West
- Cardiff Parkway
- Cardiff East

Cardiff Parkway is part of a separate development and was given planning permission by former Welsh First Minister Eluned Morgan in January 2025. The full business case for the upgrade of the relief lines was submitted by Network Rail in March 2026. There are currently no timelines for the completion of any of the remaining stations, but it is expected that Magor and Undy will be completed first. If built, these stations will likely be served by trains running between Cardiff Central and Cheltenham Spa or Bristol Temple Meads.

== Infrastructure ==
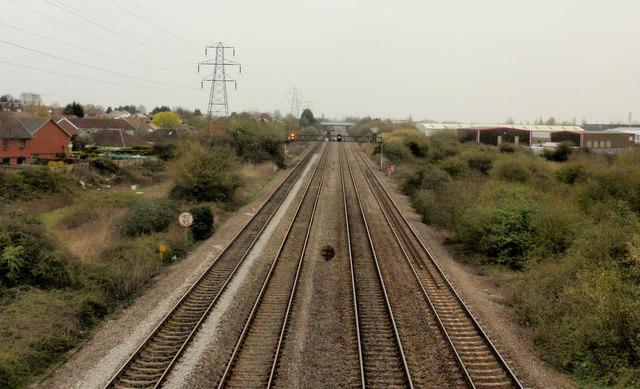
Four track railway approaching Cardiff from Newport, prior to electrification

There are four tracks from Severn Tunnel Junction through Newport to Cardiff Central, with two tracks on the remaining sections. Multiple-aspect signals are controlled from several power signal boxes including Swindon, Bristol and two in Cardiff. Over the August Bank Holiday weekend 2016, control of the signals between Westerleigh Junction and Pilning was switched over to the Thames Valley Signalling Centre. These signals now carry the prefix 'BL'.

The maximum line speed from Wootton Bassett Junction to Coalpit Heath is 125 mph (200 km/h); 90 mph (145 km/h) from Coalpit Heath to Newport; 90 mph (145 km/h) from Newport to east of Bridgend; 75 mph (120 km/h) from east of Bridgend to Swansea Loop North junction (with a small section of 100 mph (160 km/h) track through Pyle station); and 40 mph (65 km/h) from Swansea Loop North Junction to Swansea.

== Associated routes ==
A diversionary route exists if the Severn Tunnel is closed. This takes trains from Severn Tunnel Junction to Gloucester, from where they can rejoin the main line either via the Golden Valley Line to Swindon, or take the Cross-Country Route and reverse at Bristol Parkway.

If the line is closed between Cardiff Central and Bridgend, an alternative route exists along the Vale of Glamorgan Line.

The local service between Swansea and Cardiff is branded Swanline. The urban network within and surrounding Cardiff is referred to as the Valley Lines.

== Communities served ==
Towns and cities served by trains from London

- Swindon
- Bristol
- Newport
- Cardiff
- Bridgend
- Port Talbot
- Neath
- Swansea

Settlements served by local trains only

- Patchway
- Pilning (very limited service)
- Rogiet
- Llanharan
- Pontyclun
- Pencoed
- Pyle
- Baglan
- Briton Ferry
- Skewen
- Llansamlet

== Accidents and incidents ==
- On 7 March 2015, Battle of Britain-class locomotive 34067 Tangmere was hauling a charter train that overran a signal at Wooton Bassett, Wiltshire. The train's operator, West Coast Railway Company was temporarily banned from running trains on the British railway network as a direct consequence of this incident.

== See also ==
- Transport in Wales
- Transport in England
- South Wales Railway
- Great Western Main Line
