= M4 relief road =

Proposed road in Wales

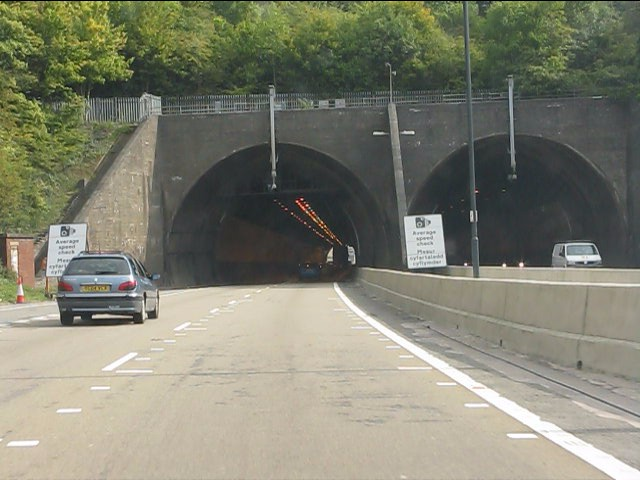
- The Brynglas Tunnels, near Newport, are affected by high peak time congestion
- Location: Newport, Wales
- Proposer: Welsh Government
- Project website: Official website
- Status: Rejected
- Type: Motorway extension
- Cost estimate (low): £1.4 billion
- Stakeholders: DfT; ORR; Traffic Wales; Minister for Transport
- Supporters: CBI; IoD; Carwyn Jones AM (Bridgend); Jayne Bryant AM (Newport West); Brexit Party; UKIP; Welsh Conservatives
- Opponents: Future Generations Commissioner for Wales; Woodland Trust; RSPB; Plaid Cymru; John Griffiths AM (Newport East); Wales Green Party; Lib Dems

The M4 relief road, also known as M4 Corridor around Newport (M4CaN), is a proposed motorway, south of the city of Newport, South Wales, intended to relieve traffic congestion on the M4 motorway.

Originally proposed by the Welsh Office in 1991, it was not pursued by the Conservative Major Government. Following devolution in 1999 the project was again drawn up by Welsh Government economic and transport minister Andrew Davies in 2004 but this was withdrawn in 2009 when the cost estimates had risen by £660m, to a total of £1 billion.

In April 2013, the Conservative-led coalition offered the Welsh Government a £830m interest-payable loan for the construction of the road. In July 2014 Welsh Transport Minister Edwina Hart stated that, despite political opposition, the scheme would go ahead.

Demand for investment grew in 2017 following a manifesto pledge by Theresa May which removed the Severn road tolls. The increased road use led to vehicle use increasing of 20% over the M4 bridge and 7% of traffic at the tunnels, increasing the already considerable congestion in Newport.

First Minister of Wales Carwyn Jones (a supporter of the road) stepped down in 2018, leaving the decision to his successor, Mark Drakeford. Drakeford was required to delay his decision due to the 2019 Newport West by-election purdah.

On 4 June 2019 Drakeford announced that the scheme would not proceed on the basis of escalating costs now at £1.4bn. 2018 estimates had however already shown that the £1.4bn figure would have been far higher once VAT costs and overspending was accounted for. Drakeford further attributed the decision to the global climate crisis and local "environmental impacts" to the Gwent Levels.

In October 2026, following the 2026 Senedd election when Plaid Cymru emerged as the largest party in government, renewed proposals were made for the relief road. On 21 October, the Senedd voted 46-44 in favour of the principle of creating a motorway relief road around Newport.

== Background ==
A second South Wales motorway was first discussed in the late 1980s, sited to the south of Newport running 14 miles (23 km) parallel to the existing M4 motorway from junction 23A at Magor, to junction 29 at Castleton, thus avoiding the need to widen the Brynglas Tunnels. The tunnels can no longer be expanded or relocated due to geological issues in the area, which has meant subsidence to a number of houses above the tunnels since construction took place.

The concept behind the motorway was first based on the M6 Toll motorway, a relief road built to reduce traffic on the M6 motorway around Birmingham.

The existing motorway runs through the Brynglas Tunnels north of Newport city centre. Like many stretches of motorway, it does not conform to current motorway standards: it lacks continuous hard shoulders due to previous widening, has closely spaced junctions and narrows to a restricted two-lane section through the Brynglas Tunnels, where heavy congestion occurs at peak hours.

A 50mph average speed zone and a 44t weight limit is in place between junctions 24 and 28. M4 slip roads at Junction 25 (Caerleon Road) are diverted to reduce traffic through the tunnels. M4 Westbound traffic joining at Junction 25 is diverted via Junction 25A/A4042 (Heidenheim Drive)/A4051 (Malpas Road) to Junction 26. Similarly eastbound traffic wishing to exit at Junction 25 is diverted from Junction 26 via the A4051/A4042/Junction 25A. This adds to congestion on Malpas Road and other local roads near Newport city centre at peak times.

According to the Welsh Government, traffic data shows that the motorway is operating at nearly "double its vehicle capacity" at peak times.

== Proposals ==
=== 1991 proposal ===
An M4 relief road between Magor and Castleton was first proposed by the Welsh Office in 1991, but there was little progress on the scheme in the following years.

Plans for the New M4 were announced on 3 March 2006 as part of a raft of measures to improve road transport in Wales. The road would have cost between £350 million (later rising by £660m to an estimated £1 billion), and financed by a Private Finance Initiative (PFI) with the Welsh Assembly. It was planned to be the United Kingdom's second full toll-paying motorway, after the M6 Toll.

Proposals in 2004 for the road to be tolled were met with scepticism. Several experts suggested that a new toll road would be "a white elephant for 20 hours a day", due to the greatly variable traffic levels through the Brynglas Tunnels. Outside peak hours, the tunnels would still have been the preferable option to taking a toll road for most people. Liberal Democrat spokesperson Jenny Randerson raised concerns about whether a toll would have been necessary on the road, as the Severn Bridge, less than 10 miles (16 km) to the east, also charges a toll to cross it and compared the plan to a "double tax on Wales". The Road Haulage Association said that an additional toll was "almost rubbing salt into the wound".

On 15 July 2009, the Deputy First Minister Ieuan Wyn Jones announced that the plans for the M4 relief were to be dropped and replaced by a package of measures to improve the flow of traffic. In November 2009, Dr. Anthony Beresford of the Business School at Cardiff University called for the decision to cancel the road to be overturned.

=== 2011 proposal ===
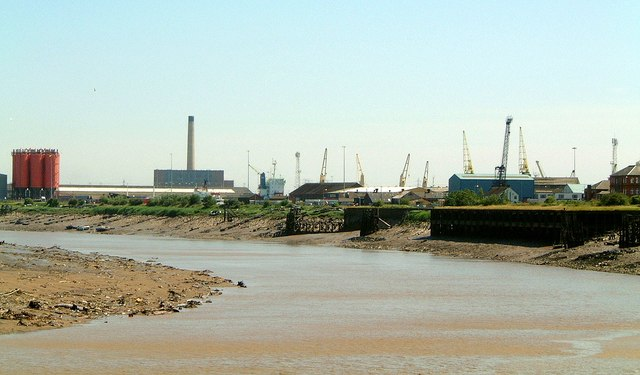
The River Usk at Newport Docks, close to where the new road would cross the river. The distant building with the tall chimney is Uskmouth Power Station.

In December 2011, the Welsh Government entered into discussions with the incoming UK Chancellor of the Exchequer, George Osborne to discuss financial assistance for the road project.

In February 2012 related work started on a dual-carriageway road connecting Newport's southern distributor road to junction 23A of the M4 using part of the proposed route of the M4 relief road and a former access road to the Llanwern steelworks.

A public consultation exercise on options for improving the capacity of the M4 corridor around Newport opened on 5 March 2012. The review was published in August 2014, and a multiple potential routes were presented. However opponents of the road criticised the report for excluding the effects of any potential growth in traffic. The report assumed the new road would see no growth in vehicle use, a finding which is contrary to induced demand studies which show road expansion leads to significant increases in vehicle use. It was also criticised for focussing on the economic impacts over the negative consequences for the environment and public transport use.

On 2 April 2013 it was reported that the Chancellor of the Exchequer George Osborne was likely to give support to the scheme in the Autumn Statement and various newspapers reporting that it would be tolled. The Welsh Government countered, saying that it had no plans for tolling. Osborne also denied any plans for tolling. A consultation on the proposed plan ran from 23 September to 16 December 2013.

In April 2013, the Conservative coalition formalised an agreement with the Welsh Government for a £830m interest-payable loan for the construction of the road at 2011 costs.

=== 2014 ===
On 16 July 2014, Wales Transport Minister Edwina Hart said that the preferred "black route" south of Newport between Junctions 23 and 29, including a new crossing of the River Usk, would go ahead despite political opposition. She said that it would boost the economy, ease traffic congestion and improve road capacity. The scheme would be the largest capital investment programme ever undertaken by the Welsh Government and was hoped that it would be finished by 2022.

In 2017, following a manifesto pledge by Theresa May at the 2017 General Election, Highways England removed road tolls on the Severn Bridges. This decision was assessed as causing an increase in traffic of 20% over the M4 bridge and 7% of traffic at the tunnels, increasing the already considerable congestion in Newport throughout 2018 and 2019.

=== 2018 postponement ===
In January 2018 the Welsh Government announced costs would rise further for the road. This was a result of opposition by Associated British Ports who sought an additional £135m for compensation to improve Newport Docks which would have been affected by the Black Route.

Welsh Government Director of Economic Infrastructure Simon Jones told the Assembly Economy Committee in early 2018 that the road would cost more than the £1.4bn first estimated due to additional VAT payments which would need to be paid by the Welsh Government.

In June 2018 the Department for Transport updated its Appraisal and Modelling Strategy which assesses Investment Decisions financed by the Government. It stated that new research was being commissioned to review how increases in road capacity lead to additional traffic (known as induced demand). It stated that Government agencies need to update assumptions on impact. The 2012 M4 Enquiry's research had assumed zero per cent change to the rate of car use, due to the decision by the Enquiry not to commission any transport growth modelling. The UK Government's own findings state that "induced demand is likely to be higher for capacity improvements in urban areas or on highly congested routes" and that the true scale of increased traffic caused by road expansion is not fully studied in the UK.

First Minister of Wales Carwyn Jones (a supporter of the road) stepped down in 2018, leaving the decision to his successor, Mark Drakeford. Drakeford was required to delay his decision due to the 2019 Newport West by-election purdah.

=== 2019 decision ===
On 4 June 2019 the First Minister of Wales, Mark Drakeford, announced that the scheme would not proceed on the basis of escalating costs now at £1.4bn. 2018 estimates had however already shown that the £1.4bn figure would have been far higher once VAT costs and overspending was accounted for. Drakeford further attributed the decision to the global climate crisis and local "environmental impacts" to the Gwent Levels. The First Minister also stated he had disagreed with the Public Inquiry which believed that the scheme represented value for money.

The Confederation of British Industry described the decision not to proceed as "a dark day for the Welsh economy", but Friends of the Earth welcomed the decision, saying it was "great news for Wales and the planet".

=== 2020 Internal Market Bill ===
In September 2020 there was widespread discussion about the impact of the United Kingdom Internal Market Bill, put forward to transfer powers previously held by the European Union, which would take effect in 2021 after the Transition Period. The bill drew the criticism of some, including the Welsh Government, who argued that it would allow the Westminster Government to push forward with the M4 Relief Road despite Welsh Government opposition. The bill would, for the first time since devolution, allow the use of "parliamentary funds to assist with 'promoting economic development' or 'providing infrastructure'" in the devolved nations. However the BBC reported that while the bill would enable the Government to "finance" such projects, it would not resolve the issue of obtaining planning permission and other hurdles to constructing the road, many of which remain devolved to Welsh Government and the Welsh Local Authorities.

=== 2026 proposals ===
In October 2026, following the 2026 Senedd election when Plaid Cymru emerged as the largest party in government, renewed proposals were made for the relief road. On 21 October, the Senedd voted 46-44 in favour of the principle of creating a motorway relief road around Newport.

== Plan ==
The current M4 would have been diverted at Magor to follow the A4810 Eastern Distributor Road, before diverting away from it across the Caldicot and Wentloog Levels. The first junction would then be located just south of the steelworks site to provide access to the Glan Llyn development site. This would have been followed by a bridge over the River Usk, before another junction over the docks providing a link to the A48 Southern Distributor Road. The remainder of the route would have crossed the levels just south of Duffryn, before an interchange with the current M4 and A48(M) at Castleton.

=== Additional measures ===
As part of improving traffic flow around Newport, the following measures have also been considered:

- Creating a link between the M4, M48 and B4245
- Improvements to Junction 28 Tredegar Park
- Removing the eastern sliproads at Junction 26 Malpas
- Downgrading the current M4 to a trunk road, to lower specifications

The government also expects the South Wales Metro to relieve congestion on the M4.

== Criticisms ==
The Public Enquiry of August 2014 was criticised at the time for excluding the effects of any potential growth in traffic. The report assumed the new road would see no growth in vehicle use, a finding which is contrary to induced demand studies which show road expansion leads to significant increases in vehicle use. It was also criticised for focussing on the economic impacts over the negative consequences for the environment and public transport use.

The initial enquiry was also seen as flawed after omitting compensation payments owed to Associated British Ports and to HM Revenue and Customs for VAT. In January 2018 the Welsh Government announced costs would rise by £135m for compensation to improve Newport Docks which would have been affected by the Black Route. Welsh Government Director of Economic Infrastructure Simon Jones in early 2018 informed the Government that the £1.4bn figure would not be sufficient due to additional VAT payments which would need to be paid.

Friends of the Earth claimed that the road would cause great damage to local wildlife habitats as it was planned to pass through the Caldicot and Wentloog Levels, an area of natural wetlands. They also raised concerns about the large sum of public money that would have been used to fund the project, claiming that it could be better spent improving the local railway network. After the July 2014 announcement that the scheme would go ahead, Gareth Clubb of Friends of the Earth Cymru called the proposal "utterly unnecessary and terribly damaging". The Campaign Against the Levels Motorway (CALM) claimed that the proposed motorway would ruin a historic landscape and increase carbon emissions.

Associated British Ports, who operate Newport Docks, said that the 2014 plans could jeopardise future investment in the area. Matthew Kennerley of ABP said: "We don't think it's a great idea to put the new route through the centre of Wales' most important general cargo port. We believe there is an alternative route...slightly further north...[which] would still have an impact on the port but to a much lesser extent because it would not be bisecting very important quayside areas."
