= South Wales Metro =

Public transport network in south-east Wales

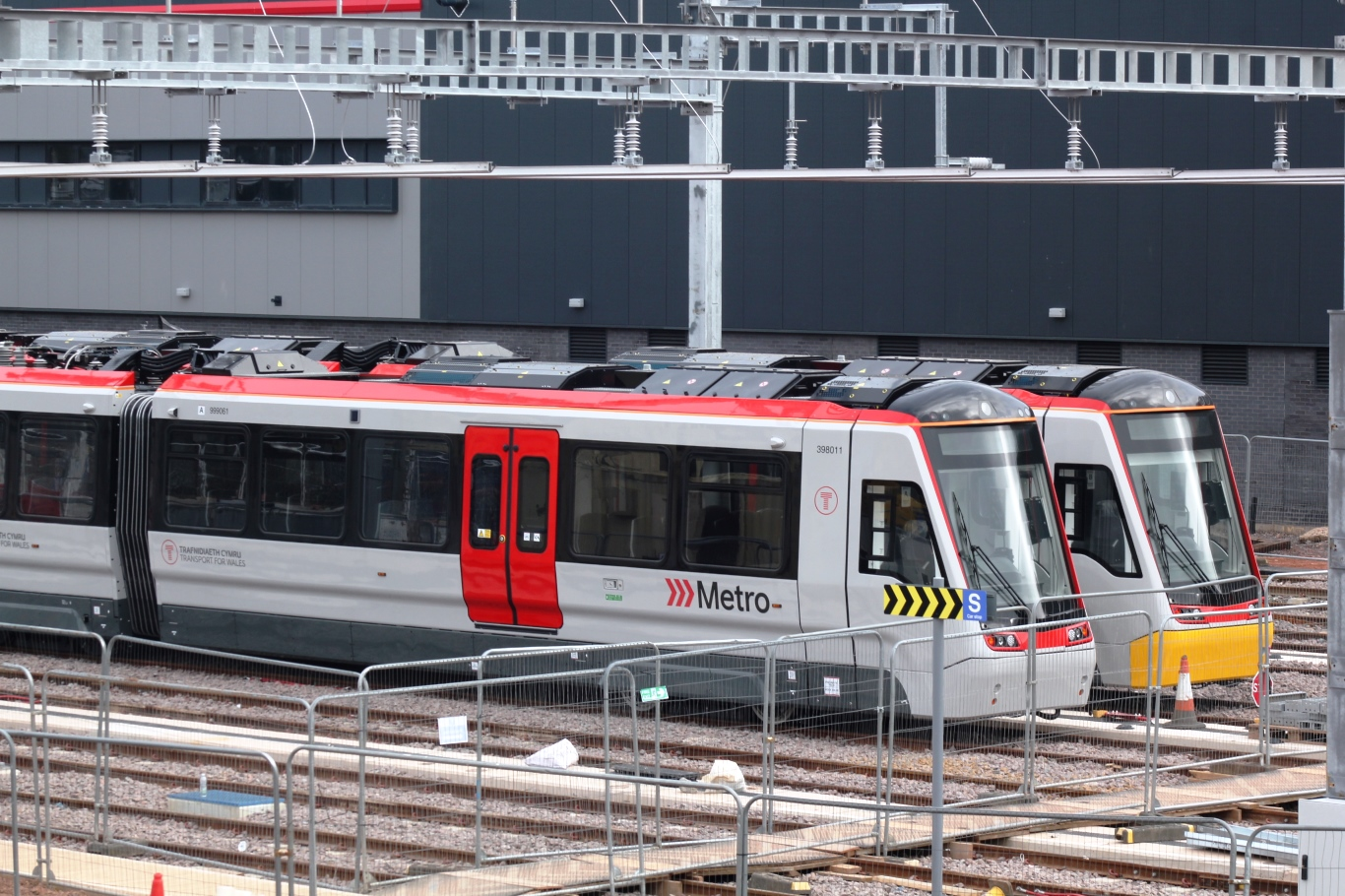
- Class 398 at the Metro Depot and Control Centre in Taffs Well.

Overview
- Native name: Metro De Cymru
- Owner: Transport for Wales; Network Rail (non-CVL railways only)
- Locale: South East Wales
- Transit type: Commuter rail; Rapid transit; Tram-train; Light rail; Bus rapid transit; Bus
- Number of lines: 9
- Number of stations: 94
- Chief executive: James Price
- Headquarters: Pontypridd
- Website: https://tfw.wales/projects/metro/south-wales-metro

Operation
- Operation will start: 2026 to 2027
- Operator: Transport for Wales Rail
- Character: Grade-separated (present); At-grade street running (under construction)
- Number of vehicles: 36 tram-trains

Technical
- System length: 105 miles 10 chains (105.13 mi; 169.2 km)
- No. of tracks: Double track
- Track gauge: 4 ft 8 1/2 in (1,435 mm) standard gauge

The South Wales Metro (Welsh: Metro De Cymru) is an integrated heavy rail, light rail and bus-based public transport services and systems network being developed in South East Wales around the hub of Cardiff Central railway station. The development will also include the electrification of the core Valley Lines and new stations: all nine lines will be electrified.

The first phase was approved for development in October 2013. A new depot was constructed at Taff's Well and new trains were built by Stadler Rail in Switzerland. The first few of the new Stadler trains entered service late 2024, and the first tram-trains are expected to fully enter service, operating to terminuses such as Merthyr Tydfil, Aberdare and Treherbert by late 2026 to early 2027.

The first phase of the South Wales Metro - the electrification of the Core Valley lines - has been completed.

== Background ==
The rail-based transport system in South Wales was heavily cut down following the Beeching report. By the 1970s, Wales kept less than half of the track it had in 1914. There were closures of some lines and many sub-branches, mainly serving the ex-mining communities, and their easy links to ports and resorts on the coast. Since 1987, five of the main closures have been reversed: services were reinstated on Cardiff's City Line that year, the Aberdare Line the following year, the Maesteg Line in 1992, the Vale of Glamorgan Line between Barry and Bridgend in 2005, and the Ebbw Vale Line in 2008.

== Development ==
In February 2011, Cardiff Business Partnership (CBP) and the Institute of Welsh Affairs published a report by Professor Mark Barry of Cardiff University, calling for an investment of £2.5 billion over ten years to connect Cardiff, Newport and the South Wales Valleys. The report concluded that with the stated investment in a regional metro system, by 2025 it would be possible to travel from the Heads of the Valleys to Cardiff or Newport in 40 minutes, by combining electrified heavy rail and light rail systems and boosted by faster rail links to London and Heathrow Airport.

After the Welsh Government, supported by parties including a CBP team led by Mark Barry, lobbied at Westminster for the extension of the Great Western Main Line electrification programme west to Swansea, and north into the South Wales Valleys, Barry developed a more detailed blueprint plan for Cardiff. After internal consultation, this was submitted by CBP to the Welsh Government's Business Minister Edwina Hart in December 2012. The scheme proposed a £200 million investment in a Cardiff Crossrail scheme based on trams, between St Mellons in the east via Cardiff Central, south into Cardiff Bay, north to Coryton, converting a number of Valley Lines heavy rail routes to light rail, and a new route north-west via Ely and Radyr Court to the M4 motorway near Creigiau.

From Autumn 2012, Barry led the private sector Metro Consortium, with the common aim of promoting the South Wales Metro project, which included representatives from Capita, Jones Lang LaSalle, The Urbanists and Steer Davies Gleave. They produced a further interim report, "A Cardiff City Region Metro: transform | regenerate | connect" published in February 2013. Hart then commissioned Barry to lead a more detailed analysis of the potential benefits: The Metro Impact Study of October 2013. This more substantive report concluded that an initial £1 billion investment in an integrated metro transport network for South East Wales could, within 30 years, add 420,000 people to the network, create 7,000 new jobs and invest an additional £4 billion into the regional economy.

In October 2013, after Barry had submitted his report to Hart at the end of summer 2013, the Business Minister endorsed the report. She allocated £62 million for phase one of the scheme to improve bus and rail links, including rail infrastructure improvements, station upgrades, park and ride schemes, bus corridors, and walking and cycling schemes. She also set up a working group to examine detailed proposals for the potential subsequent stages of the Cardiff Capital Region Metro system.

In 2024, Barry documented his recollections of the advocacy and development of the Cardiff Capital Region (or South Wales) Metro from 2010-2024, in his book, How to build a Metro.

== Implementation ==
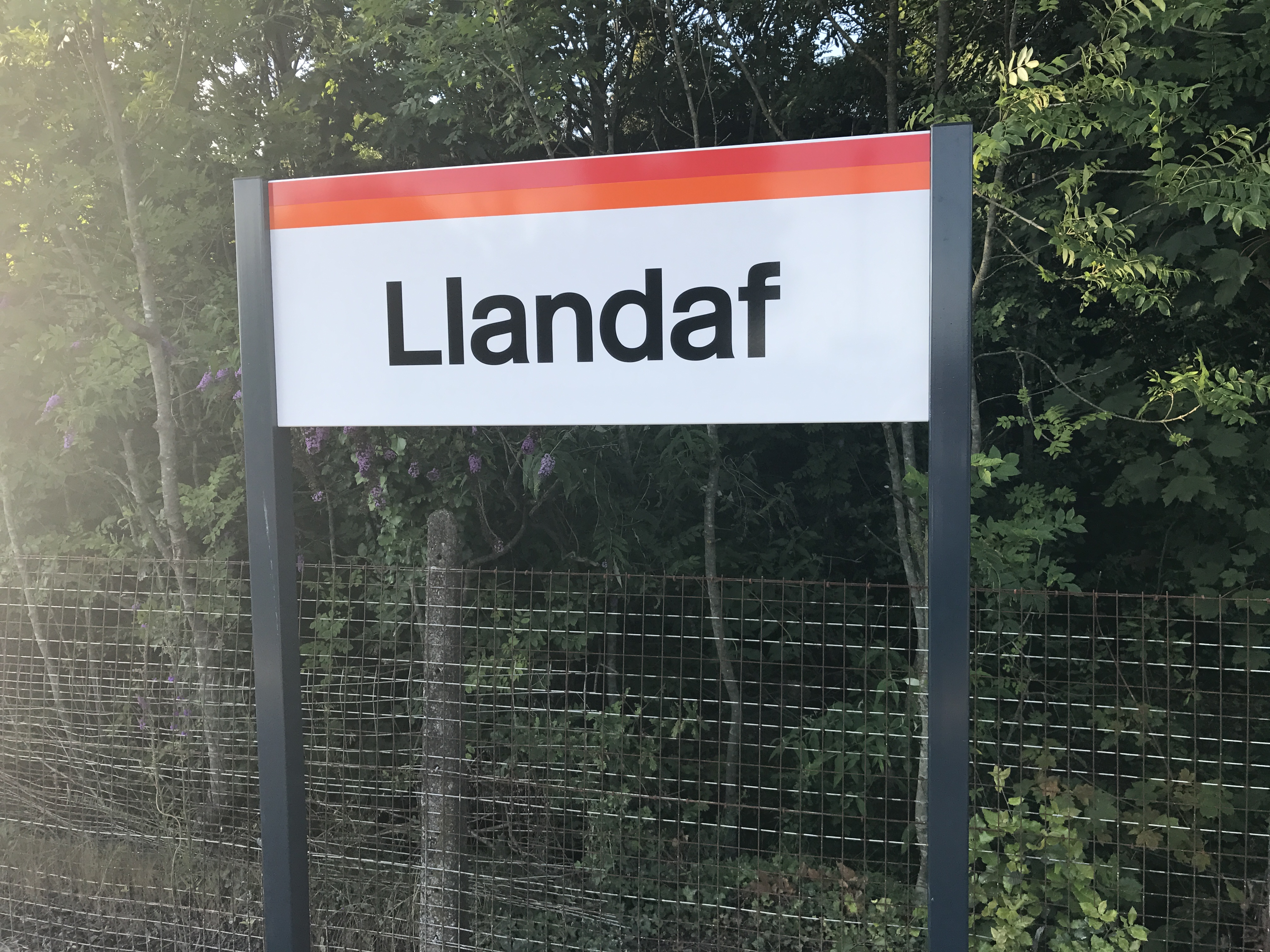
Llandaf station sign with interim Metro branding, July 2017

The then First Minister Carwyn Jones formally launched the South Wales Metro in November 2015, with the Welsh Government setting out its aspirations for the Metro in its November 2015 publication, "Rolling Out Our Metro".

Procurement for the Metro began in July 2016, as part of the procurement process for the next Wales & Borders franchise. This was managed by Transport for Wales. This concluded in May 2018, with the awarding of the franchise to KeolisAmey Wales, trading as Transport for Wales Rail Services, from 14 October 2018.

Details of the £5 billion investment were announced in June 2018. All of Wales' rail services were to be run over 15 years by two European companies jointly.

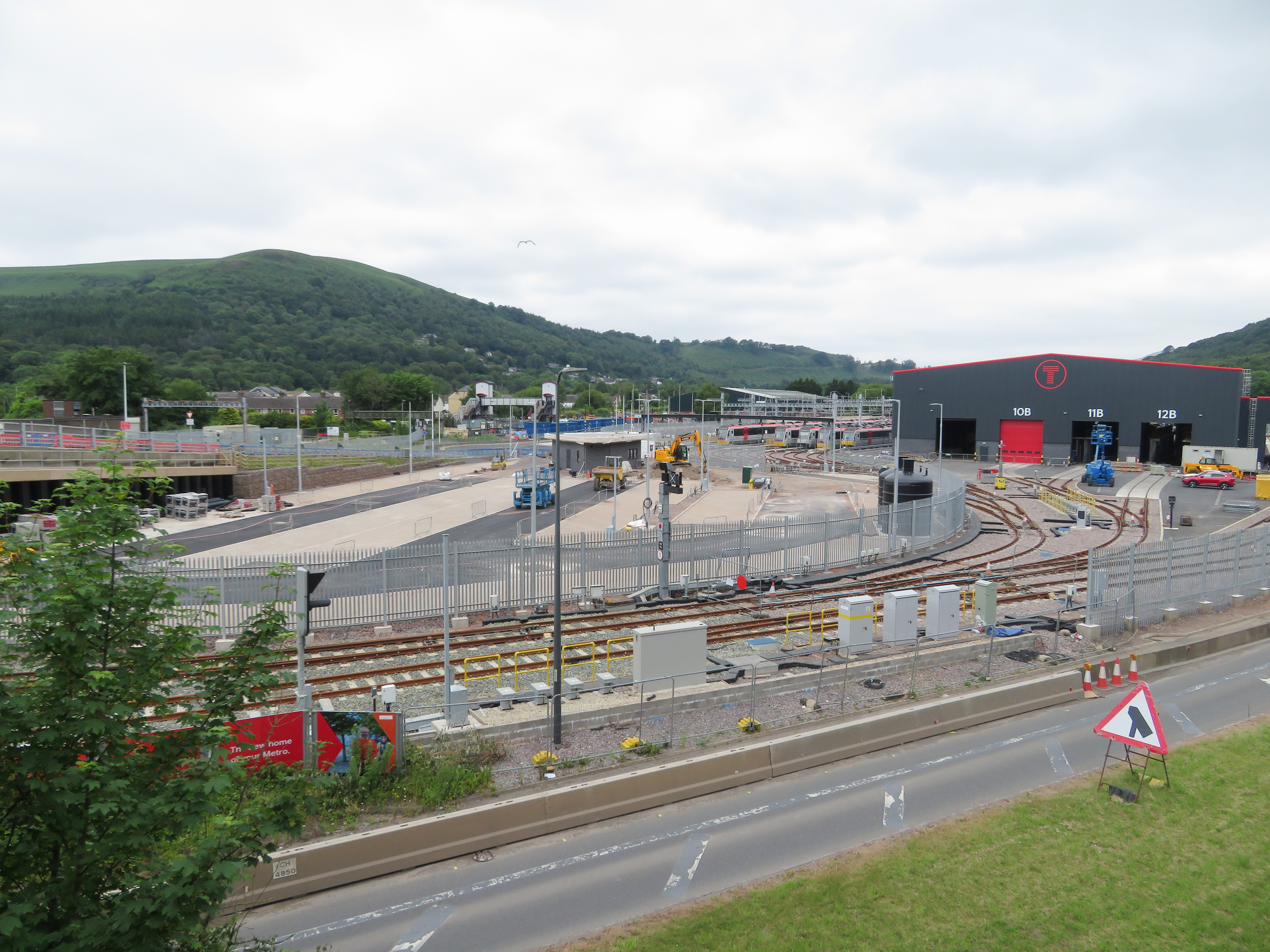
The Metro depot at Taffs Well

In October 2018, £119 million of funding was obtained from the European Union to support the modernisation plans. In January 2019, a new report had proposed several new schemes such as a rail link to Abertillery.

In August 2019, it was announced that work on the project would be delayed due to "unresolved issues", particularly around maintenance cost estimates, which are preventing sale of the freehold land, buildings, and operational assets, by current owner Network Rail to the Welsh Ministers. The deal would require approval from the Office of Rail & Road before contractor KeolisAmey Wales could undertake work including electrification and other improvements. The project faced a deadline of 2022 for some work, as the work would need to meet the deadline for the £159 million in awarded European Regional Development funding, which will not be available after that date due to Brexit.

It was announced that work on the project would start on 3 August 2020, beginning with track improvements on lines to Merthyr Tydfil, Aberdare and Treherbert. These lines would operate as a rail replacement service between 8 pm and 5 am until December 2020, except on Fridays and Saturdays. The phase two works were scheduled to be completed by 2023.

Total cost of South Wales metro part 1 has been cited by the Welsh government as £88.5 million in a brochure on the development.

The total cost of South Wales Metro part 2 is estimated to be £738 million; this includes "electrification of the CVL; double tracking of selected route sections; a direct connection from the Treherbert, Aberdare and Merthyr Tydfil lines to Cardiff Bay; and a new train stabling facility at Taff’s Well". In addition, £800 million will be invested in rolling stock, bring the phase two total to £1.54 billion.

=== New fleet ===
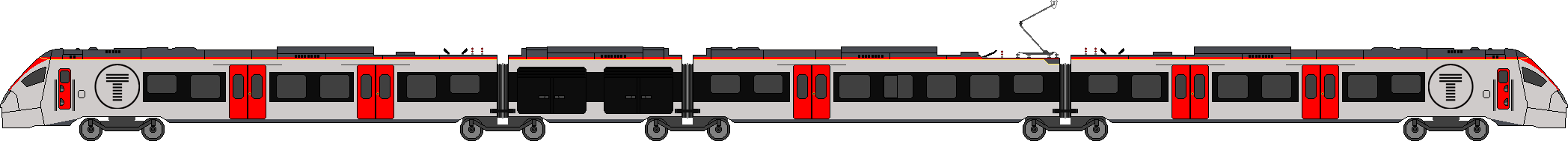
Transport for Wales Class 756 Stadler FLIRT 3 Car Diagram

The fleet operating the South Wales Metro will consist of Stadler Rail's FLIRT and Citylink families. Class 231 bi-mode trainsets and Class 756 tri-mode trainsets will operate on conventional railways, while Class 398 battery-electric tram-trains will operate on both on-street tracks and conventional railways.

By 2021, TfW had taken delivery of two Class 231s. The remaining trainsets were delivered by November 2025, when Charles III opened the South Wales Metro Depot at Taff's Well.

== Proposed network ==
=== Existing rail network ===
- South Wales Main Line from Severn Tunnel Junction west to Newport, Cardiff Central and Bridgend
- Cardiff Central:
  - Valley Lines:
    - Northwest to Coryton
    - North to Pontypridd:
      - Onwards to Treherbert
      - Onwards to Hirwaun
      - Onwards to Merthyr Tydfil
      - Onwards to Aberdare
  - West via Maesteg Line to Maesteg
  - South via Vale of Glamorgan Line to:
    - Penarth
    - Barry Island
    - Bridgend via Rhoose and Llantwit Major
  - East via Ebbw Vale Line to Ebbw Vale Town
  - North-east via Welsh Marches Line to Abergavenny
- Cardiff Queen Street:
  - South via Cardiff Bay branch to Cardiff Bay

=== Current proposals ===
- Cardiff Bay:
  - New intermediate station at Butetown
  - On-street extension to Cardiff Central via Callaghan Square
- Newport:
  - North via Ebbw Vale Line to Ebbw Vale Town
- Valley Lines:
  - New station at Crwys Road
  - New station at Gabalfa
  - Relocated Treforest Estate station
- South Wales Main Line
  - New station at Cardiff East
  - New station at Cardiff Parkway (private proposal)
  - New station at Newport West
  - New station at Somerton
  - New station at Llanwern
  - New station at Magor & Undy

=== Former proposals ===
These routes were planned to be developed as high-speed bus routes or light rail/tram-based services – however, they are not currently part of the Metro plans:

- Cardiff Central:
  - South to:
    - Culverhouse Cross
    - Porth Teigr
- Cardiff:
  - Cross-route east/west from Coryton to Heath, Cardiff Gate, and then south to a new station at St Mellons
  - On street extension to a relocated Cardiff Bay station
- Beddau: connecting:
  - North-east to Pontypridd
  - South-east to Cardiff Central
  - South-west via Llantrisant, Miskin/Pontyclun to Bridgend
- Llantrisant, connecting:
  - North via Porth to Maerdy
- Pontypridd: connecting:
  - North-east via Ystrad Mynach, Pontllanfraith, Newbridge to Pontypool
- Pontllanfraith: new hub, connecting:
  - North to Tredegar
- Hirwaun:
  - Cross-valley route via Merthyr Tydfil, Rhymney, Tredegar to Ebbw Vale
- Newport:
  - North via Ebbw Vale Line to Abertillery
  - West via the former Brecon and Merthyr Tydfil Junction Railway to Treharris, via Pye Corner, Machen, Caerphilly, Ystrad Mynach and Nelson.

== See also ==
- Swansea Bay and West Wales Metro
- North Wales Metro
- Valleys & Cardiff Local Routes
- Cardiff Capital Region
