= South East Wales Transport Alliance =

Regional Transport Consortium for South East Wales

South East Wales Transport Alliance (Sewta) was a consortium established by the 10 local authorities in South East Wales to promote and develop transport strategies and projects in the region. Founded on 1 April 2003, Sewta worked in close liaison with partners representing public transport operators.

A video by the South East Wales Transport Commission; November 2020

Sewta was stood down on 19 September 2014.

== Members ==
The members of Sewta were:

- Blaenau Gwent County Borough Council
- Bridgend County Borough Council
- Caerphilly County Borough Council
- Cardiff County Council
- Merthyr Tydfil County Borough Council
- Monmouthshire County Council
- Newport City Council
- Rhondda Cynon Taf County Borough Council
- Torfaen County Borough Council
- Vale of Glamorgan Council

== Partners ==
The local authorities worked in partnership with:

- Sustrans
- Passenger Focus
- Arriva Trains Wales
- First Great Western
- Network Rail
- Bus Users UK
- Confederation of Passenger Transport

== Role and Aims ==
The main functions of Sewta were to:

- prepare regional transportation strategies, plans and programmes
- apply for external funding to carry out those programmes
- act for the Councils in respect of programme actions resourced through that funding
- respond to consultation documents having a regional dimension
- advise the Councils on transportation issues.

Sewta did not have a responsibility for highway and road safety issues, nor did Sewta own or operate buses and trains.
