= Gilwern Halt railway station =

Former railway station in Wales

Gilwern Halt
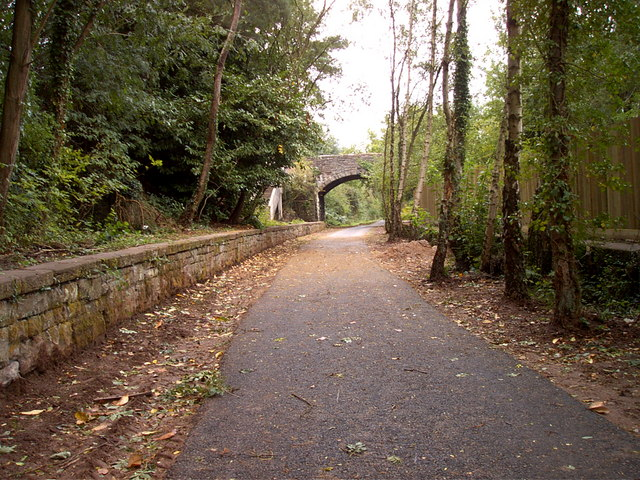
- Station remains in 2006.

General information
- Location: Gilwern, Monmouthshire; Wales
- Coordinates: 51.8189°N 3.0994°W
- Grid reference: SO243139
- Platforms: 2

Other information
- Status: Disused

History
- Original company: Merthyr, Tredegar and Abergavenny Railway
- Pre-grouping: London and North Western Railway
- Post-grouping: London, Midland and Scottish Railway

Key dates
- c. February/March 1863: Opened
- c. 1932-33: Became a halt
- 6 January 1958: Closed
Location

Gilwern Halt railway station was a station on the London and North Western Railway's Heads of the Valleys line near the village of Gilwern in the Welsh county of Brecknockshire.

== History ==
The first section of the Merthyr, Tredegar and Abergavenny Railway from Abergavenny to Brynmawr was opened on 29 September 1862. The line was leased and operated by the London and North Western Railway (L&NWR) which acquired the smaller railway company on 30 June 1866. The L&NWR was itself amalgamated into the London, Midland and Scottish Railway in the 1923 Grouping.

Gilwern first appeared in Bradshaw in April 1863, however the line's engineer, John Gardner, had reported on 27 January 1863 that it was due for completion in three or four weeks and on 6 August he confirmed that it had been open for five months which suggests the actual opening took place in late February or early March. The station was situated in a cutting which was crossed by a road bridge at the western end of the station. It was reached from the east on a 1 in 37 climb from Govilon with the line rising 150 feet (46 m) in less than 2 miles (3.2 km). The station was conveniently situated for Gilwern village which was only 1/2 mile (0.80 km) away. It was also convenient for the Brecknock and Abergavenny Canal and for this reason attracted a good summer passenger traffic as the Sunday schools in the area had afternoon outings to spend by the canal.

It had two curved platforms with the 'Up' platform higher than the 'Down' as a result of the curvature. A timber-built station building was situated on the 'Up' platform while a wooden passenger shelter was provided on the 'Down' platform. Steps led upwards from the 'Down' platform to the road bridge. To the east was Gilwern Stone Quarry which was served by a siding branching off from the Down line. The siding was controlled by a signal box which was in operation from 1890 to c. 1921 when the siding had been removed. In c. 1932-33, the station was downgraded to a railway halt at around the same time as Trevil.

Decline in local industry and the costs of working the line between Abergavenny and Merthyr led to the cessation of passenger services on 4 January 1958. The last public service over the line was an SLS railtour on 5 January 1958 hauled by LNWR 0-8-0 49121 and LNWR Coal Tank No. 58926. Official closure came on 6 January.

Preceding station	Disused railways	Following station
Clydach; Line and station closed	London and North Western Railway; Merthyr, Tredegar and Abergavenny Railway	Govilon; Line and station closed

== Present ==
The platforms have survived and the trackbed through the station is part of National Cycle Route 46.
