= Abergavenny Brecon Road railway station =

Former railway station in Monmouthshire, Wales

Abergavenny (Brecon Road)
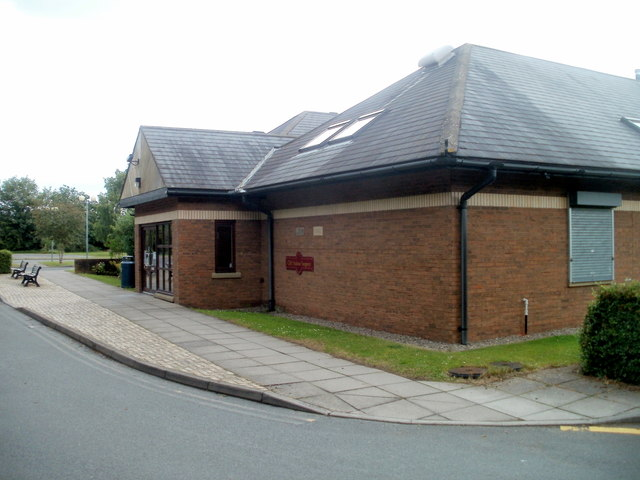
- Station site in 2011.

General information
- Location: Abergavenny, Monmouthshire; Wales
- Coordinates: 51.8256°N 3.0251°W
- Grid reference: SO294146
- Platforms: 2

Other information
- Status: Disused

History
- Original company: Merthyr, Tredegar and Abergavenny Railway
- Pre-grouping: London and North Western Railway
- Post-grouping: London, Midland and Scottish Railway

Key dates
- 1 October 1862: Opened
- 6 January 1958: Closed to passengers
- 5 April 1971: Final closure
Location

Abergavenny (Brecon Road) railway station was a station on the London and North Western Railway's Heads of the Valleys line serving the town of Abergavenny in the Welsh county of Monmouthshire.

== History ==
=== Opening ===
The first section of the Merthyr, Tredegar and Abergavenny Railway from Abergavenny to Brynmawr was opened on 29 September 1862. The line was leased and operated by the London and North Western Railway (L&NWR) which acquired the smaller railway company on 30 June 1866. The L&NWR was itself amalgamated into the London, Midland and Scottish Railway (LMS) in the 1923 Grouping.

Abergavenny (Brecon Road) opened on 1 October 1862. After the ceremonial first train as far as Govilon on 29 September, public services commenced on the first day of the L&NWR's lease of the line.

=== Facilities ===
The station was situated on a steep descent from Govilon, with the line carried on an embankment rising to the hillside south-west of Abergavenny and reaching a gradient of 1 in 34. It was located north-west of the centre of Abergavenny which had a population of c. 9000 during the line's lifetime. Two platforms were provided, with an additional excursion platform on the Up line to the west of the road bridge carrying the line over the Brecon Road. At the east end of the Down platform was a loading dock.

Brecon Road was the location of locomotive sheds, a goods shed and yard, as well as the shed for the District Engineer's coach and engine. The yard had two operational parts: the coal yard, also known as the lower yard, where there were railway barracks used as sleeping accommodation for train crews, and the upper yard with storage and stabling sidings.

Stables, a weighing machine and a pumphouse stood opposite the gasworks on the Down side of the line. The pump, which drew its supply from the River Usk, was powered by steam until c. 1928 from which time electricity was used. A private house was provided near the station as offices for the District Traffic Superintendent until more spacious facilities were built at Brecon in 1867. The building was extended in 1890 as traffic increased. Two signal boxes, No. 1 and No. 2, controlled respectively the upper yard and lower yards as well as engines coming on and off shed. No. 1 was in operation from February 1900 and July 1964 when use of the upper yard ceased. No. 2 box, which was adjacent to the stone three-arched bridge carrying Union Road over the line, marked the point from which the line was truncated westwards in 1958. A private siding served the gasworks from c. 1870 to July 1960, while another siding was provided for the Union Workhouse from 1872 to 1951.

=== Locomotive shed ===
Once it began working the Merthyr line in 1862, the L&NWR found the facilities for servicing locomotives at Abergavenny Junction unsatisfactory and set about providing proper arrangements at Brecon Road station. The site chosen was 300 yards (270 m) from the gasworks on the Up side of the line. By the end of 1867 works were underway on two buildings adjacent to one another: one of eight roads (182 ft × 105 ft (55 m × 32 m)) and one of four roads (165 ft × 80 ft (50 m × 24 m)). In the south-west corner of the site was a 42 feet (13 m) turntable which by 1899 was later relocated nearer the road bridge crossing the neck of the yard and extended to handle ROD 2-8-0s. The turntable lasted until 1953. The shed buildings were extended by Webb in 1896 who enclosed the vacant area to the rear of the four-road building to extend the roads to 290 feet (88 m) in length. Brecon Road shed was used by the Great Western Railway, notably for banking engines working from Abergavenny Monmouth Road to Llanvihangel.

Designated L&NWR shed no. 31 under the charge of a District Locomotive Superintendent, the allocation was around 40 locomotives. In 1919, 37 L&NWR Coal Tanks were allocated here and were frequently used on light passenger trains and, in 1947, nine L&NWR 380 Class designed for the hill-climbing required by the route were allocated. Little modernisation was carried out by the LMS which coded the shed 4D in 1935 and it became part of British Railways on nationalisation in a practically unchanged state. Recoded 86K by the Western Region in 1950, as use declined, the roofing from all but two of the shorter roads was removed. At this time, 16 L&NWR 0-8-0s were allocated here, although this was to change when the withdrawal of freight facilities between Abergavenny and Merthyr left the shed as little more than a stabling point. This took official effect from 22 November 1954 and final closure of the shed came on 4 January 1958.

=== Closure ===
Decline in local industry and the costs of working the line between Abergavenny and Merthyr led to the cessation of passenger services on 4 January 1958. The last public service over the line was an SLS railtour on 5 January 1958 hauled by LNWR 0-8-0 49121 and L&NWR Coal Tank No. 58926. Official closure came on 6 January. The line between Brecon Road goods yard and Abergavenny Junction remained open for goods traffic until 4 April 1971, the last section of the Abergavenny and Merthyr line to close.

Preceding station	Disused railways	Following station
Govilon; Line and station closed	London and North Western Railway; Merthyr, Tredegar and Abergavenny Railway	Abergavenny Junction; Line and station closed

== Present ==
The site of the old station is now a local doctor's surgery. After closure of the line, the station building was offered to let. The site of the locomotive depot has been taken over by modern industrial units.
