= Govilon railway station =

Former railway station in Govilon, Wales

Govilon
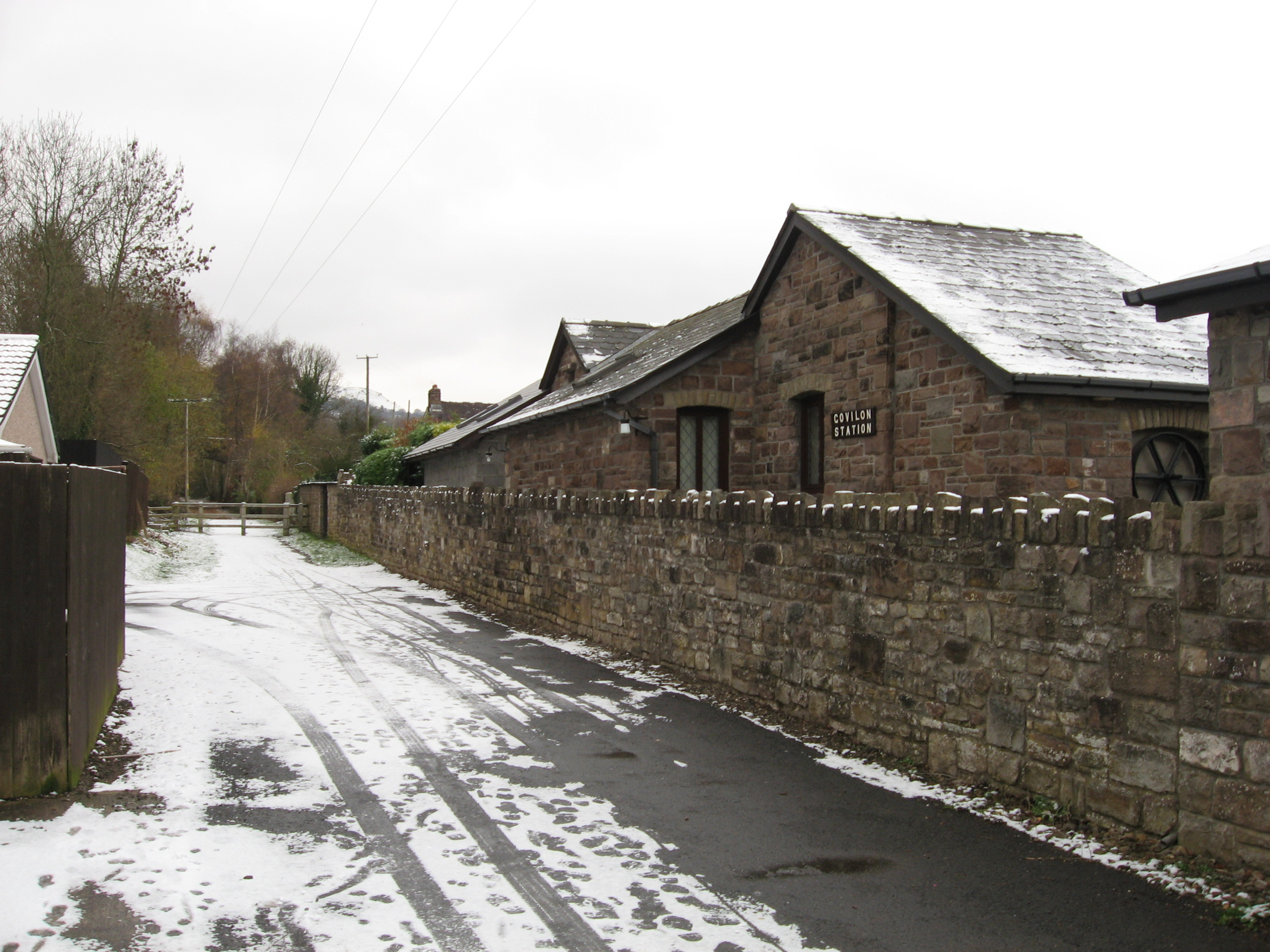
- Station building in 2010.

General information
- Location: Govilon, Monmouthshire; Wales
- Coordinates: 51.8160°N 3.0675°W
- Grid reference: SO265135
- Platforms: 2

Other information
- Status: Disused

History
- Original company: Merthyr, Tredegar and Abergavenny Railway
- Pre-grouping: London and North Western Railway
- Post-grouping: London, Midland and Scottish Railway

Key dates
- 1 October 1862: Opened
- 6 January 1958: Closed
Location

Govilon railway station was a station on the London and North Western Railway's Heads of the Valleys line serving the village of Govilon in the Welsh county of Monmouthshire.

== History ==
The first section of the Merthyr, Tredegar and Abergavenny Railway from Abergavenny to Brynmawr was opened on 29 September 1862. The line was leased and operated by the London and North Western Railway (L&NWR) which acquired the smaller railway company on 30 June 1866. The L&NWR was itself amalgamated into the London, Midland and Scottish Railway in the 1923 Grouping.

Govilon opened on 1 October 1862. The section of line had been ceremonially opened on 29 September 1862 with the first train running as far as Govilon, the only completed station at that time, under the control of the wife of Captain James Hill, the company's vice-chairman. Public services commenced on 1 October, the first day of the L&NWR's lease of the line. The station was situated on a steep 9-mile (14 km) climb from Abergavenny at gradients as severe as 1 in 34. A gradient post showing 1 in 80 / 1 in 34 was installed on one of the station platforms. It was the nearest station to Llanfoist House, the residence of Crawshay Bailey, director of the Merthyr company and moving force behind the line's construction.

A stone-built low-built station building was provided on the Up platform, with a large station house similar in style to the building at Clydach set back behind it. Between the rear of the Up platform and the station house was a single siding which served a small goods yard until after the First World War; another siding to the west of the line served the Wildon Ironworks from 1885 to 1941. Also to the west was a small goods shed and road bridge. A third siding was situated 400 yards (370 m) to the east which led to a wharf on the Monmouth and Brecon Canal until 1953. No. 1 signal box was opened in 1911 near the canal wharf and lasted until c. 1930. No. 2 box was erected at the east end of the Down platform in 1877; it controlled the road crossing to the east of the station.

Decline in local industry and the costs of working the line between Abergavenny and Merthyr led to the cessation of passenger services on 4 January 1958. The last public service over the line was an SLS railtour on 5 January 1958 hauled by LNWR 0-8-0 49121 and LNWR Coal Tank No. 58926. Official closure came on 6 January.

Preceding station	Disused railways	Following station
Gilwern Halt; Line and station closed	London and North Western Railway; Merthyr, Tredegar and Abergavenny Railway	Abergavenny Brecon Road; Line and station closed

== Present ==
The station building, which has survived into private ownership, is the only one to do so of the stone-built structures provided on the lower part of the Abergavenny and Merthyr line. National Cycle Route 46 runs in front of the building.
