= Rhymney Bridge railway station =

Former railway station in Wales

Rhymney Bridge
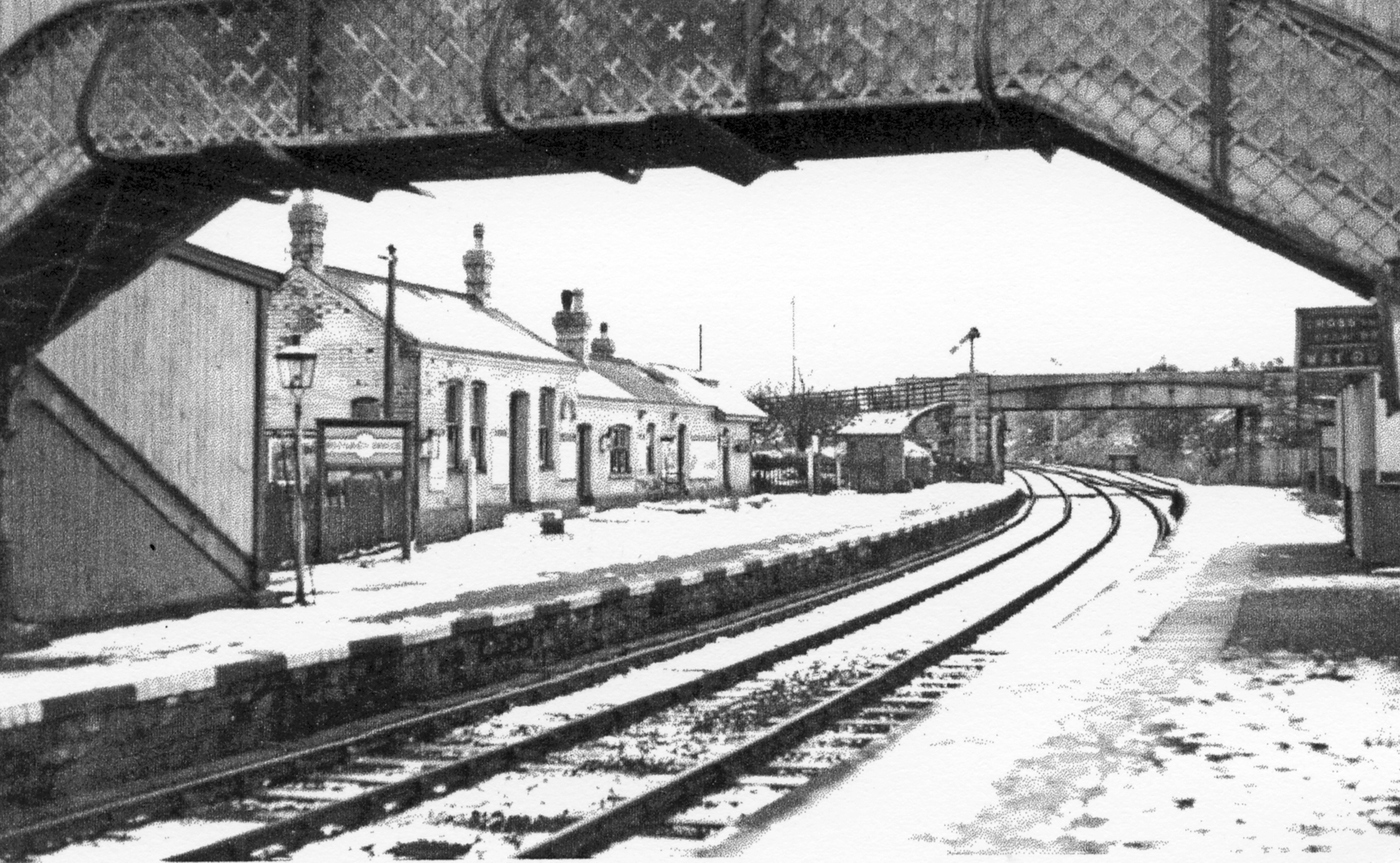
- Rhymney Bridge station, 1951

General information
- Location: Llechryd, Caerphilly; Wales
- Coordinates: 51.7778°N 3.2987°W
- Grid reference: SO104095
- Platforms: 3

Other information
- Status: Disused

History
- Original company: Nantybwch and Rhymney Joint
- Pre-grouping: London and North Western Railway and Rhymney Railway
- Post-grouping: London, Midland and Scottish Railway and Great Western Railway

Key dates
- 2 October 1871: Opened for Rhymney Railway services
- 1 January 1873: Start of L&NWR services
- 21 September 1953: Withdrawal of Rhymney services
- 22 November 1954: Withdrawal of goods facilities
- 6 January 1958: Final closure
Location

Rhymney Bridge railway station was a station on the London and North Western Railway's Heads of the Valleys line serving the village of Llechryd in the Welsh county of Glamorganshire.

== History ==
The first section of the Merthyr, Tredegar and Abergavenny Railway from Abergavenny to Brynmawr was opened on 29 September 1862. The line was leased and operated by the London and North Western Railway (L&NWR) which acquired the smaller railway company on 30 June 1866. On 1 March 1864, the line was extended from Brynmawr to Nantybwch. A further 3-mile (4.8 km) extension to Rhymney Bridge through to Rhymney was jointly constructed by the L&NWR and the Rhymney Railway; the section to Rhymney Bridge was double-track whilst the Rhymney portion was single-track. The joint line came into operation on 5 September 1871 when the junction was opened; the L&NWR had running powers over the Rhymney's line to Cardiff Docks.

The station, which was at first known as Rumney Bridge, opened to Rhymney services on 2 October 1871 and to L&NWR services on 1 January 1873. It took its name from the bridge over the River Rhymney which was situated a short distance to the south-east; the nearest settlement was the village of Llechrhyd. The station had three platform faces and, as with the junction at Nantybwch, the signal box stood in the "V" of an island platform. The two platforms serving the Abergavenny and Merthyr line had no passenger accommodation, although a brick station building stood on the Merthyr platform. This structure has been described as "resembling a peasant's dwelling from the bleak wastes of northern China". Rhymney Bridge itself was situated in a desolate location, with scant protection from the inclement weather provided by a weather-boarded footbridge linking the platforms. The Rhymney branch platform was situated at a lower level to the main line platforms and was skirted by two goods loops which were useful for slow-moving goods trains.

As a result of decline in the local industry and the costs of working the line between Abergavenny and Merthyr, passenger services ended on 4 January 1958. Services on the Rhymney branch had ceased on 23 September 1953 and goods facilities were withdrawn from Rhymney Bridge on 22 November 1954. The last public service over the Merthyr line was an SLS railtour on 5 January 1958 hauled by LNWR 0-8-0 49121 and L&NWR Coal Tank No. 58926. At Rhymney Bridge, a laurel wreath was placed on the smokebox door of No. 58926. Official closure came on 6 January.

Preceding station	Disused railways	Following station
Dowlais Top; Line and station closed	London and North Western Railway; Merthyr, Tredegar and Abergavenny Railway	Nantybwch; Line and station closed
Terminus	London and North Western Railway and Rhymney Railway; Nantybwch and Rhymney Joint Line	Rhymney; Line closed, station open

== Present ==
The site of the station has been lost under the A465 road. The branch to Rhymney has been obliterated by the A469 road.
