= Beaufort railway station (Wales) =

Disused railway station in Beaufort, Blaenau Gwent

Beaufort
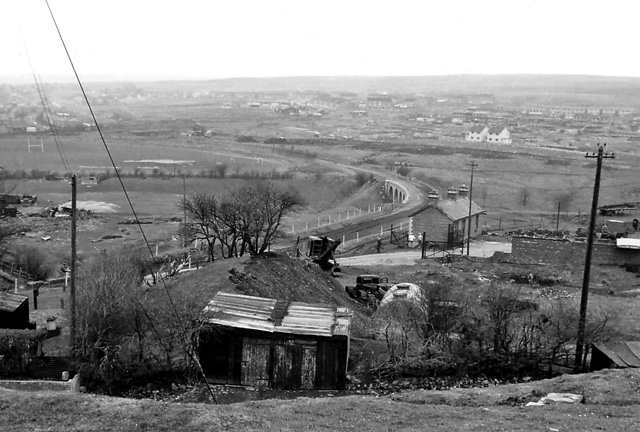
- Station site in 1965.

General information
- Location: Beaufort, Blaenau Gwent; Wales
- Coordinates: 51.7980°N 3.2067°W
- Grid reference: SO168116
- Platforms: 2

Other information
- Status: Disused

History
- Original company: Merthyr, Tredegar and Abergavenny Railway
- Pre-grouping: London and North Western Railway
- Post-grouping: London, Midland and Scottish Railway

Key dates
- 1 March 1864: Opened
- 2 September 1867: Becomes a junction for Ebbw Vale
- 2 April 1951: Ebbw Vale branch closes
- 6 January 1958: Closed to passengers
- 2 November 1959: Closed to goods traffic
Location

Beaufort railway station was a station on the London and North Western Railway's Heads of the Valleys line serving the village of Beaufort in the Welsh county of Brecknockshire.

== History ==
The first section of the Merthyr, Tredegar and Abergavenny Railway from Abergavenny to Brynmawr was opened on 29 September 1862. The line was leased and operated by the London and North Western Railway which acquired the smaller railway company on 30 June 1866. Beaufort station opened on 1 March 1864. It became a junction station on 2 September 1867 with the opening of a branch to Ebbw Vale. The station nameboards read "Change for Ebbw Vale" even though the branch service started at Brynmawr. Beaufort was busy with Ebbw Vale traffic until c. 1925 as there was a daily service to and from Brynamwr of over thirty trains. Ebbw Vale was reached by the 93-yard (85 m) Beaufort Viaduct before reaching Ebbw Vale Junction and the 93-yard (85 m) Rhyd Viaduct. Ebbw Vale station was near the area which is known locally as 'The Crossing', in the town centre.

Beaufort station was situated in a cutting to the west of a road bridge. It stood opposite the Beaufort Ballroom and adjacent to the Beaufort Arms Public House. It had two platforms accessible by flights of steps leading down from the road bridge. The main station building was built of stone, with a timber waiting shelter was provided on the opposite platform. As Beaufort is situated 1,200 feet (370 m) above sea level, harsh winters such as that of 1946-47 could result in the cutting being blocked with snow. The line to Ebbw Vale closed on 2 April 1951. The Abergavenny line was the next to close when passenger services ceased on 4 January 1958. The last passenger service over the line was an SLS railtour on 5 January 1958 hauled by LNWR 0-8-0 49121 and LNWR 0-6-2 tank 58926' Final closure came on 2 November 1959 when coal traffic from Tredegar ceased.

| Preceding station | Disused railways | Following station |
|---|---|---|
| Trevil Halt; Line and station closed | London and North Western Railway; Merthyr, Tredegar and Abergavenny Railway | Brynmawr; Line and station closed |
| Ebbw Vale (High Level); Line and station closed | London and North Western Railway; Merthyr, Tredegar and Abergavenny Railway | Brynmawr; Line and station closed |

== Present ==
The station site has been obliterated following realignment of the junction of the A4047 and B4560 at SO168117. In addition, the cutting which held the station has been infilled to road level.
