= Ebbw Vale (High Level) railway station =

Former railway station in Monmouthshire, Wales

Ebbw Vale (High Level)
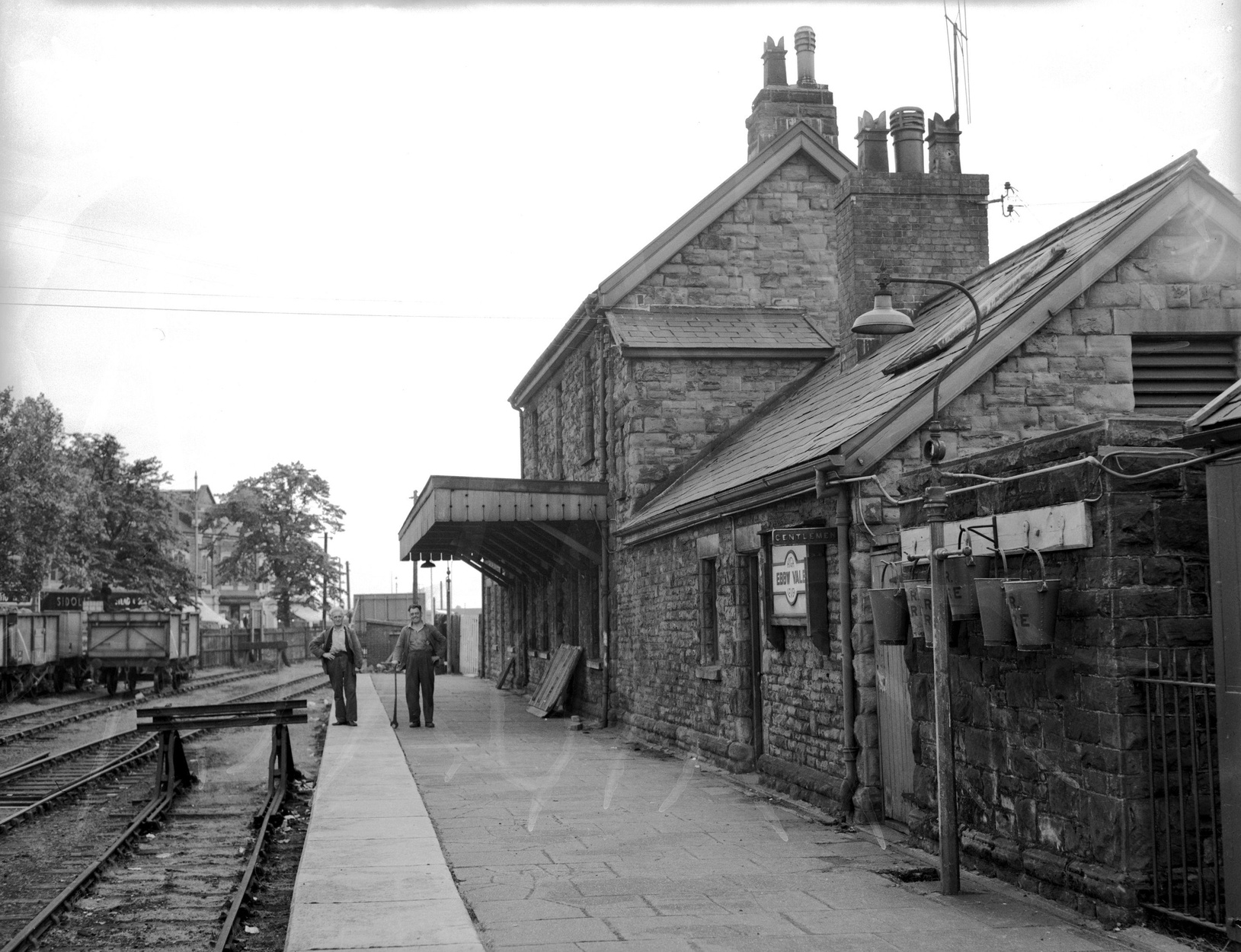
- The station in 1958

General information
- Location: Ebbw Vale, Blaenau Gwent; Wales
- Coordinates: 51.7804°N 3.2076°W
- Grid reference: SO167097
- Platforms: 1

Other information
- Status: Disused

History
- Original company: London and North Western Railway
- Pre-grouping: London and North Western Railway
- Post-grouping: London, Midland and Scottish Railway

Key dates
- 2 September 1867: Opened as Ebbw Vale
- 23 May 1949: Renamed
- 5 February 1951: Closed to passengers
- 2 November 1959: Closed to goods traffic
Location

Ebbw Vale (High Level) railway station was a station on a short branch from the London and North Western Railway's Heads of the Valleys line which served the town of Ebbw Vale in the Welsh county of Monmouthshire.

== History ==
The first section of the Merthyr, Tredegar and Abergavenny Railway from Abergavenny to Brynmawr was opened on 29 September 1862. The line was leased and operated by the London and North Western Railway (L&NWR) which acquired the smaller railway company on 30 June 1866. On 2 September 1867, a branch was opened to Ebbw Vale. The branch service started at Brynmawr and, prior to 1925, there was a daily service of more than thirty trains each way. Ebbw Vale was reached by the 93-yard (85 m) Beaufort Viaduct before reaching Ebbw Vale Junction and the 93-yard (85 m) Rhyd Viaduct. Much of the branch descended towards Ebbw Vale on 1 in 42 gradient. A connection ran north-eastwards to the Ebbw Vale Iron Works. A substantial amount of freight was carried to and from the ironworks.

The station was sandwiched between James Street and Market Street, with the main station building facing the latter. St James Methodist Church was prominent behind the single platform which backed on to James Street. A signal box was at the south end of the station before the point where the line crossed Market Street on the level. The station was near the Great Western Railway's own Ebbw Vale station and there was considerable rivalry between this company and the L&NWR. The L&NWR insisted that the signalman manning the signalbox descend to ring a handbell five minutes before the departure of a train and again once it had left. The station booking office was closed two minutes before the departure of a train which resulted in late would-be passengers having to wait outside a locked gate until the train departed. To distinguish the two Ebbw Vale stations, British Railways added the suffix "High Level" (the L&NWR station) and "Low Level" (the GWR station) on 23 May 1949.

The High Level station suffered from the disadvantage that, although it was more centrally located than the Low Level, services went to Brynmawr and not to Newport where most passengers wished to travel. Passenger services, which at that time consisted of two each way on weekdays and five extra services on Saturdays, were withdrawn from the branch on 5 February 1951, although goods facilities were provided until 2 November 1959. From 22 November 1954, goods services were routed via the Sirhowy Railway and Nantybwch.

| Preceding station | Disused railways | Following station |
|---|---|---|
| Beaufort (LNWR); Line and station closed | London and North Western Railway; Merthyr, Tredegar and Abergavenny Railway | Terminus |

== Present ==
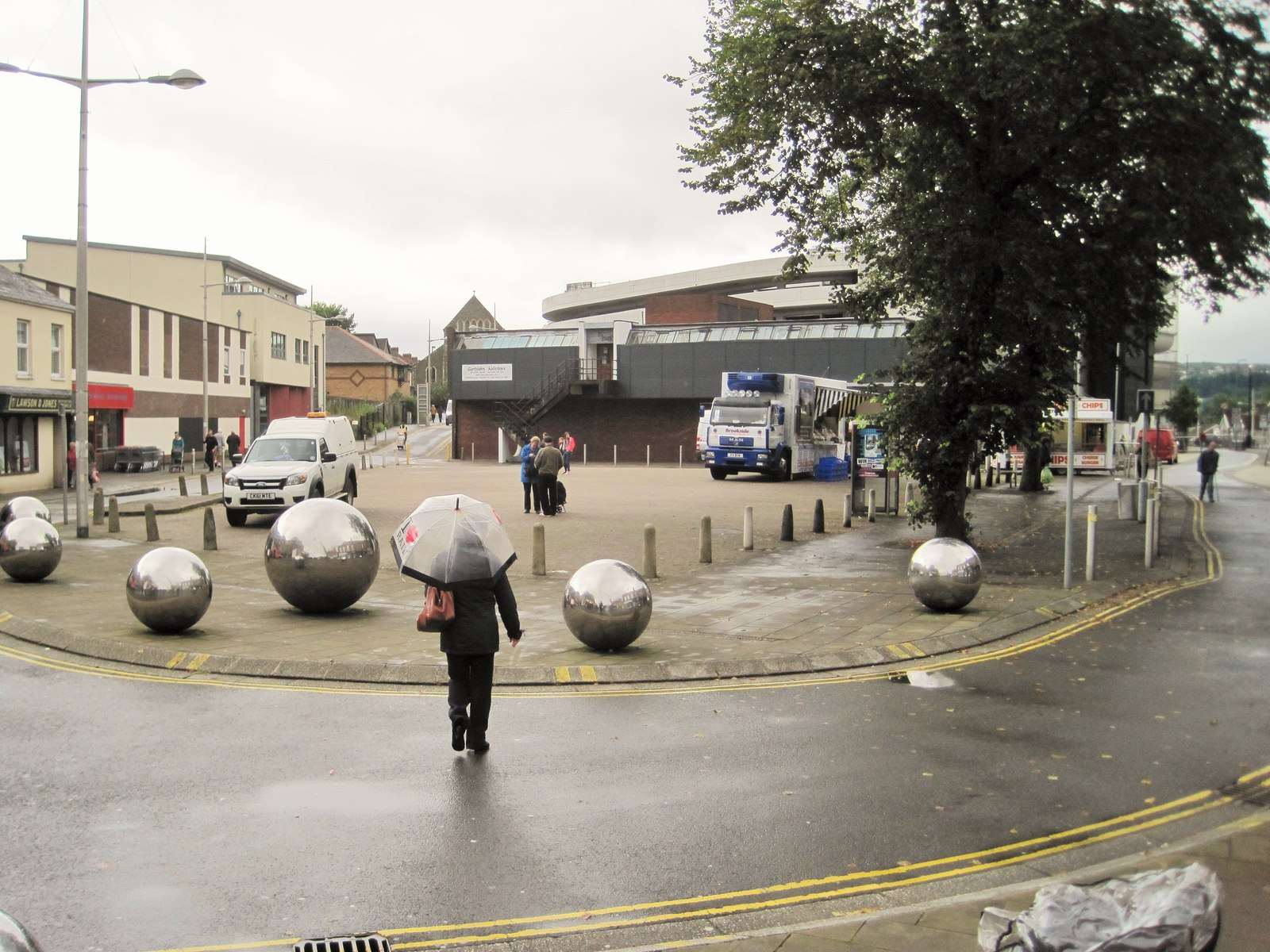
The site of the station in 2015

The station site has been redeveloped as a shopping complex, having previously been a multi-storey car park. The angle of the building to the road follows the former railway alignment. The Ebbw Vale leisure centre has been constructed on the trackbed about 0.5 miles (0.80 km) north of the former terminus.
