= Clydach railway station =

Former railway station in Wales

Clydach
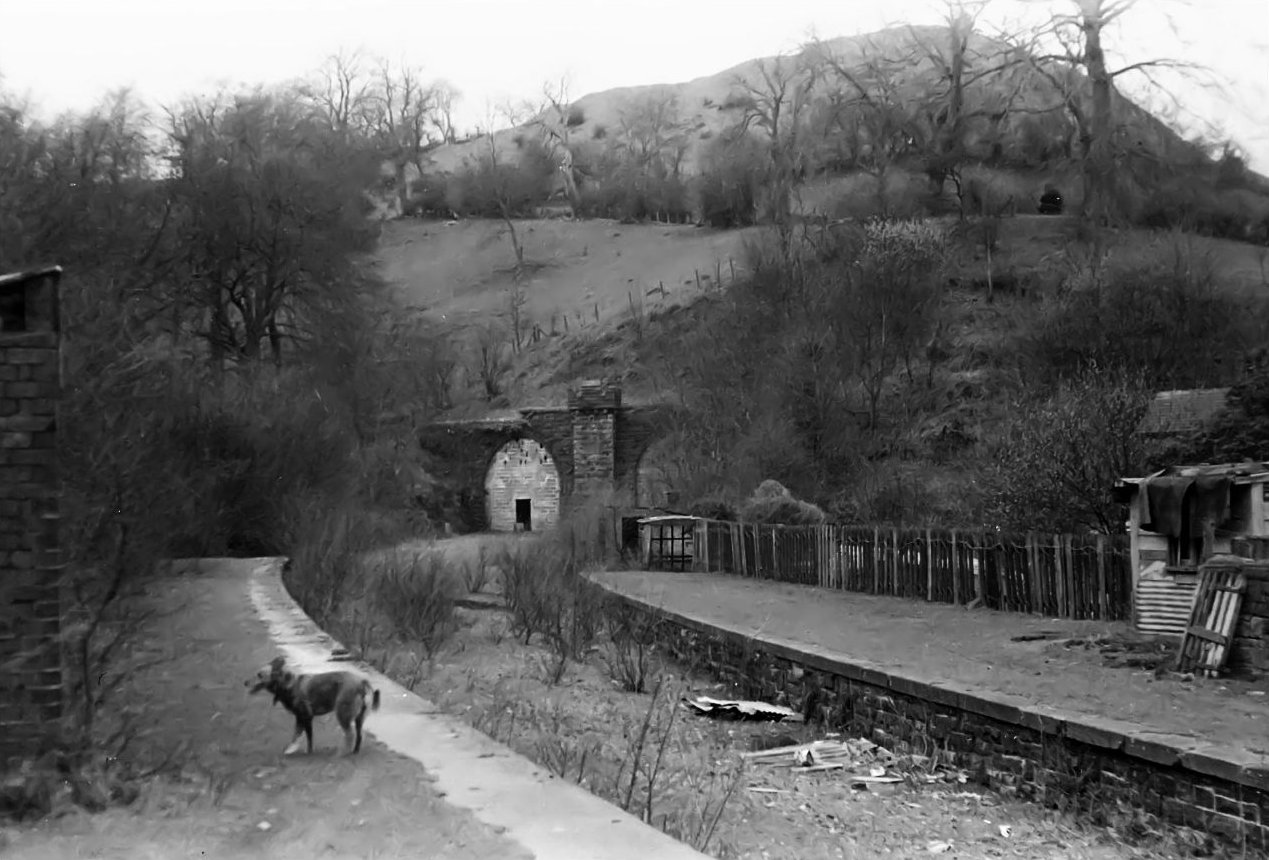
- Station site in 1973.

General information
- Location: Clydach, Monmouthshire; Wales
- Coordinates: 51.8076°N 3.1158°W
- Grid reference: SO231127
- Platforms: 2

Other information
- Status: Disused

History
- Original company: Merthyr, Tredegar and Abergavenny Railway
- Pre-grouping: London and North Western Railway
- Post-grouping: London, Midland and Scottish Railway

Key dates
- 12 December 1863: Opened
- 2 May 1938: Goods facilities withdrawn
- 6 January 1958: Closed
Location

Clydach railway station was a station on the London and North Western Railway's Heads of the Valleys line near the village of Clydach in the Welsh county of Brecknockshire.

== History ==
The first section of the Merthyr, Tredegar and Abergavenny Railway from Abergavenny to Brynmawr was opened on 29 September 1862. The line was leased and operated by the London and North Western Railway (L&NWR) which acquired the smaller railway company on 30 June 1866. The L&NWR was itself amalgamated into the London, Midland and Scottish Railway in the 1923 Grouping.

Clydach opened in December 1863 and first appeared in Bradshaw in January 1864, The station was situated below a quarry-scarred mountainside at the top of which were houses bordered by rock and scree situated ominously near the edge. The station was east of Clydach Viaduct composed of eight semi-circular arches built of old red sandstone with 30-foot (9.1 m) spans on a curve of 10 chains (200 m) radius at a gradient of 1 in 38. The viaduct, which is 312 feet (95 m) long and 75 feet (23 m) high with 13 feet (4.0 m) between the parapets, was designed by Gardner to carry the line over the Clydach Gorge and the Clydach Stream. The distance between the parapets was increased to 26 feet (7.9 m) when the line was doubled in 1877. To the west of the station was the twin-bore Clydach Tunnel (Down 302 yards (276 m); Up 330 yards (300 m)).

The station had two platforms; on the Up platform was a station building of generous proportions constructed of locally sourced limestone. A private siding served the Clydach and Abergavenny Lime and Stone Company which operated a nearby limestone quarry and lime kilns supplying the Clydach Ironworks. The company used its own private owner wagons. The siding trailed off upwards to the north-east at the western end of the viaduct where a weighing machine and office were installed in the fork of the junction. Opposite the weighing machine was a signal box built in 1898. The works closed in c. 1935 after which goods facilities were withdrawn from Clydach on 2 May 1938.

Decline in local industry and the costs of working the line between Abergavenny and Merthyr led to the cessation of passenger services on 4 January 1958. The last public service over the line was an SLS railtour on 5 January 1958 hauled by LNWR 0-8-0 49121 and LNWR Webb Coal Tank No. 58926]. Official closure came on 6 January.

Preceding station	Disused railways	Following station
Gelli Felen Halt; Line and station closed	London and North Western Railway; Merthyr, Tredegar and Abergavenny Railway	Gilwern Halt; Line and station closed

== Present ==
Parts of the platforms and the station house have survived and are divided between two private owners. The trackbed near the station is part of National Cycle Route 46.
