= Nantybwch railway station =

Former railway station in Monmouthshire, Wales

Nantybwch
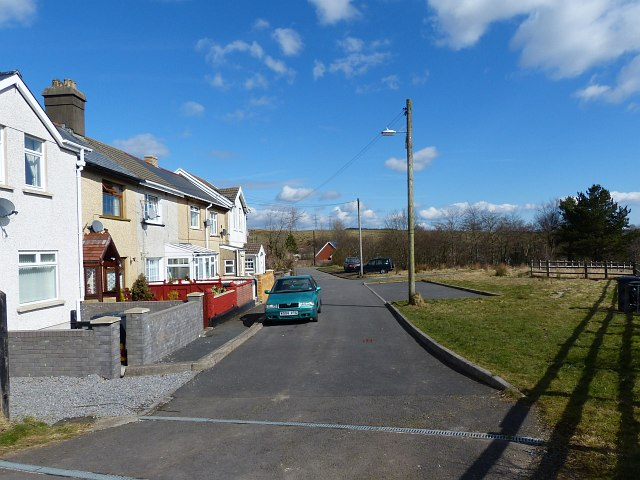
- Railway cottages which stood opposite station site in 2013.

General information
- Location: Nantybwch, Blaenau Gwent; Wales
- Coordinates: 51.7876°N 3.2647°W
- Grid reference: SO128106
- Platforms: 4

Other information
- Status: Disused

History
- Original company: Merthyr, Tredegar and Abergavenny Railway
- Pre-grouping: London and North Western Railway
- Post-grouping: London, Midland and Scottish Railway

Key dates
- 1 March 1864: Opened as Tredegar
- 1 November 1868: Renamed
- 2 November 1868: Becomes a junction station
- 4 January 1958: Withdrawal of Abergavenny and Merthyr services
- 13 June 1960: Final closure
Location

Nantybwch railway station was a station on the London and North Western Railway's Heads of the Valleys line serving the village of Nantybwch in the Welsh county of Monmouthshire.

== The village ==
Nantybwch, or Nant-y-Bwch, is immediately north of Tredegar in the Sirhowy Valley, on the A4048 near its junction with the Heads of the Valleys road. Its most notable feature is the nearby Parc Bryn Bach, a park with a large recreational lake. It is also on Route 467 of the National Cycle Network.

== History ==
The first section of the Merthyr, Tredegar and Abergavenny Railway from Abergavenny to Brynmawr was opened on 29 September 1862. The line was leased and operated by the London and North Western Railway which acquired the smaller railway company on 30 June 1866. On 1 March 1864, the line was extended from Brynmawr to Nantybwch where a station was opened. Initially named Tredegar, it was renamed Nantybwch on 1 November 1868, the day before the public opening of the northward extension from Sirhowy of the Sirhowy Railway which had its own Tredegar station.

The station was reached by the 118 yards (108 m) nine-arch Blaen-y-Cwm viaduct. It was situated to the north of the small settlement from which it took its name and to the north-west of the local school. Road access was via an unmade up lane reached by passing staff cottages adjacent to the line. Situated at 1,165 feet (355 m) above sea level, the station was situated in a desolate and bleak landscape. To the west the three miles to Rhymney Bridge were at a gradient of 1 in 35, whilst to Sirhowy the gradients varied between 1 in 42 and 1 in 37. Single-engine loads between Rhymney and Nantybwch were restricted to 12 loaded wagons only.

Four platform faces were provided: two platforms either side of a curving island platform, a bay platform for Sirhowy services and a platform for Merthyr services. The Merthyr platform was adjacent to the road entrance and the platform building incorporated a ticket office and porters' room. A weather-boarded footbridge linked the platforms which were lit by Sugg's Rochester pattern gaslights. On the island platform was No. 1 signal box which was completed in 1891 and remained in use until 1959. On the Down island platform until 1929 was the Area Traffic Control Office near No. 1 box until it was relocated to Abergavenny. On the Up side was a water column fed from a brick-lined reservoir. Beyond the station to the west was No. 2 box which was stone-built and of Rhymney Railway design; it controlled the goods sidings adjacent to the double track which were used for stabling and running around stock after closure of the line to the west. Colliers' coaches were also stored here for the Sirhowy trains.

As a result of decline in the local industry and the costs of working the line between Abergavenny and Merthyr, passenger and goods services ceased on 4 January 1958. The last passenger service over the line was an SLS railtour on 5 January 1958 hauled by LNWR 0-8-0 49121 and LNWR 0-6-2 tank 58926. Final closure of Nantybwch came on 13 June 1960 with the withdrawal of the Sirhowy services,; the last timetable showing three trains on weekdays from Tredegar. The final day of operations was in fact the previous Saturday 11 June when GWR 5700 No. 3634 worked the last Up train from Tredegar at 4.32pm and the last Down at 4.50pm with No. 8711. The last train was the 6.33pm from Risca to Tredegar which had been extended to Nantybwch and departed from there at 7.52pm. Earlier in the day there had been a rare Saturday excursion special from Brynmawr to Barry Island which called at Nantybwch.

Preceding station	Disused railways	Following station
Rhymney Bridge; Line and station closed	London and North Western Railway; Merthyr, Tredegar and Abergavenny Railway	Trevil Halt; Line and station closed
Terminus	London and North Western Railway; Sirhowy Railway	Sirhowy; Line and station closed

== Present ==
The site of the station has been lost under the A465 road.
