= Trevil Halt railway station =

Disused railway station in Trefil, Blaenau Gwent

Trevil Halt

General information
- Location: Trefil, Blaenau Gwent; Wales
- Coordinates: 51.7962°N 3.2377°W
- Grid reference: SO147115
- Platforms: 2

Other information
- Status: Disused

History
- Original company: Merthyr, Tredegar and Abergavenny Railway
- Pre-grouping: London and North Western Railway
- Post-grouping: London, Midland and Scottish Railway

Key dates
- 1 March 1864: Opened
- c. 1932/3: Becomes a halt
- 6 January 1958: Closed
Location

Trevil Halt railway station was a station on the London and North Western Railway's Heads of the Valleys line serving the village of Trefil in the Welsh county of Monmouthshire.

== History ==
The first section of the Merthyr, Tredegar and Abergavenny Railway from Abergavenny to Brynmawr was opened on 29 September 1862. The line was leased and operated by the London and North Western Railway which acquired the smaller railway company on 30 June 1866. On 1 March 1864, the line was extended from Brynmawr to Nantybwch.

Trevil opened with the extension of the line on 1 March 1864. The village had a long association with tramroads, the Trevil Rail Road having been established in May 1793 and operating from 1797. The Sirhowy Tramroad ran southwards to Sirhowy Ironworks. The Rassa Railroad ran from Trevil limestone quarries to the north-east, under the Merthyr and Abergavenny line, and to the Beaufort Ironworks. Originally, constructed to 3 ft 4 in (1,016 mm), it was converted to 4 ft 2 in (1,270 mm) gauge to link with the Sirhowy Tramroad. The works and five collieries comprising 57.5 miles (92.5 km) of private mineral lines were purchased by Richard Thomas & Co. in 1935.

Trevil station was in an isolated location, situated just to the south of the Castle Inn. It had two platforms, the main brick-built station building and house being situated on the Down platform. No goods yard was provided but parcels were handled and private sidings were provided in connection with the Beaufort Ironworks which ran parallel with the Sirhowy Tramway. These sidings lasted until May 1938. At the same time, the station's signal box was replaced by a frame in the bay window of the station house in order to maintain the block post. A few years earlier, in c. 1932–33, the station had been downgraded to a railway halt.

As a result of decline in the local industry and the costs of working the line between Abergavenny and Merthyr, passenger services ended on 4 January 1958. The last public service over the line was an SLS railtour on 5 January 1958 hauled by LNWR 0-8-0 49121 and LNWR 0-6-2 tank 58926. Official closure came on 6 January.

== Present ==
After closure the track was removed and the platforms demolished. The station building became a private house but the trackbed was used for a new road.

Preceding station	Disused railways	Following station
Nantybwch; Line and station closed	London and North Western Railway; Merthyr, Tredegar and Abergavenny Railway	Beaufort; Line and station closed

== Present ==
The site of the station has been lost under the A465 road.
