= Gelli Felen Halt railway station =

Former railway station in Monmouthshire, Wales

Gelli Felen Halt
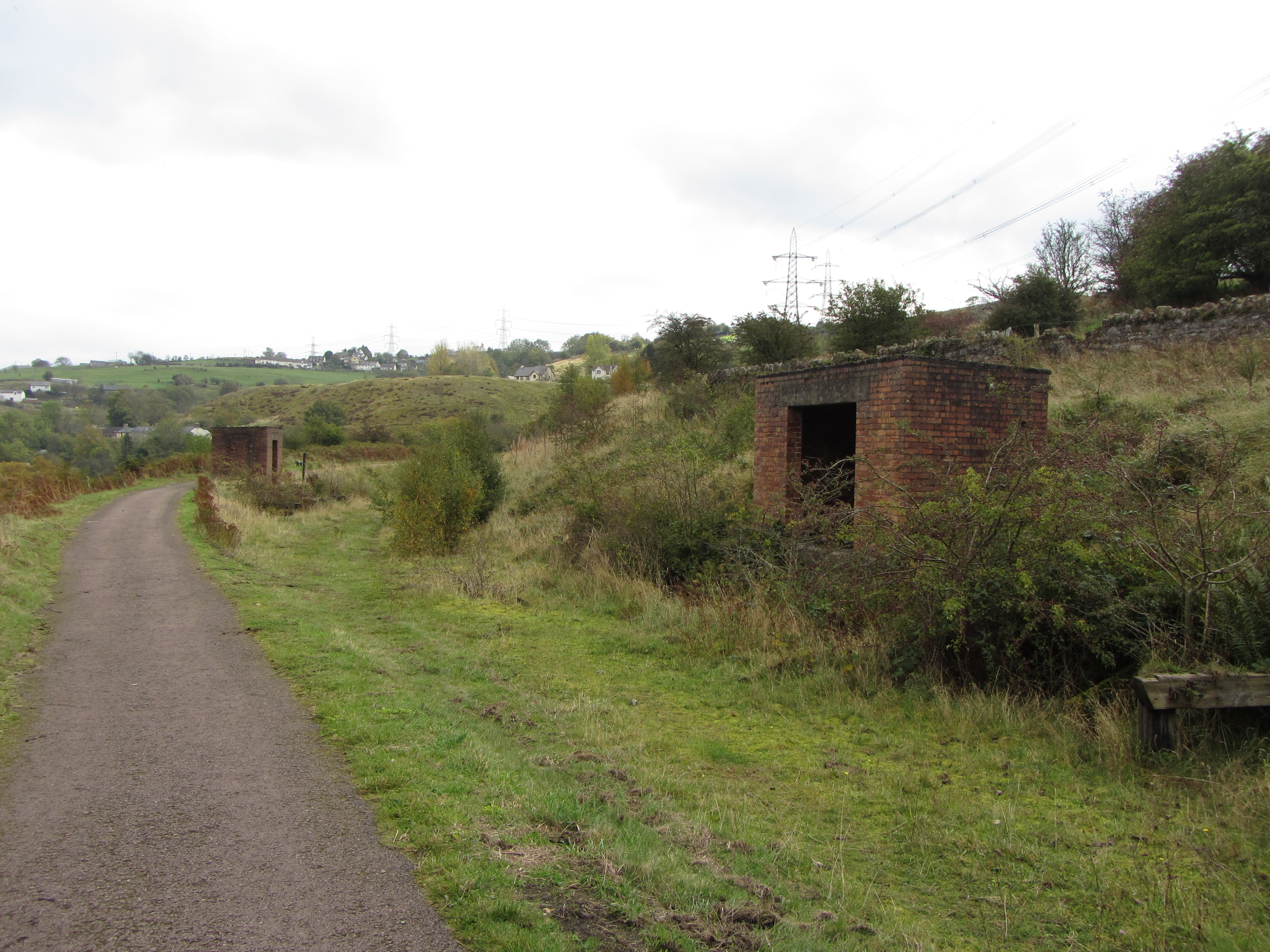
- Station remains in 2011.

General information
- Location: Gellifelin, Monmouthshire; Wales
- Coordinates: 51.8033°N 3.1420°W
- Grid reference: SO213122
- Platforms: 2

Other information
- Status: Disused

History
- Original company: London, Midland and Scottish Railway

Key dates
- 6 September 1933: Opened
- 6 January 1958: Closed
Location

Gelli Felen Halt railway station was a station on the London and North Western Railway's Heads of the Valleys line near the settlement of Gellifelin in the Welsh county of Monmouthshire.

== History ==
The first section of the Merthyr, Tredegar and Abergavenny Railway from Abergavenny to Brynmawr was opened on 29 September 1862. The line was leased and operated by the London and North Western Railway (L&NWR) which acquired the smaller railway company on 30 June 1866. The L&NWR was itself amalgamated into the London, Midland and Scottish Railway (LMS) in the 1923 Grouping.

Gelli Felen Halt was opened by the LMS on 6 September 1933. It was situated to the west of the twin-bore Gelli Felen Tunnel (Down 386 yards (353 m); Up 352 yards (322 m)) from which the station was reached on a sharp left-hand curve where flangeless 0-8-4T locomotives had in the past derailed. At this point the line ran along the sheer rock face of the cutting side which was reinforced with engineering brick. Gelli Felen railway halt was in an isolated location on a 1 in 38 gradient on a sharp curve requiring check rails to prevent derailment. Short staggered platforms were provided with a barrack-like brick huts as passenger shelters. To the west of the station there had been a signal box, crossover and siding but these had gone by 1931; the signal box was opened on the Up side in 1898 and was known as Gellavalln.

As a result of decline in the local industry and the costs of working the line between Abergavenny and Merthyr, passenger services ceased on 4 January 1958. The last public service over the Merthyr line was an SLS railtour on 5 January 1958 hauled by LNWR 0-8-0 49121 and LNWR Coal Tank No. 58926. Official closure came on 6 January.

Preceding station	Disused railways	Following station
Brynmawr; Line and station closed	London, Midland and Scottish Railway; Merthyr, Tredegar and Abergavenny Railway	Clydach; Line and station closed

== Present ==
The platform shelters have survived in an overgrown state and the trackbed through the station is part of National Cycle Route 46.
