= Dowlais Top (LNWR) railway station =

Disused railway station in Dowlais, Merthyr Tydfil

Dowlais Top (LNWR)

General information
- Location: Dowlais, Merthyr Tydfil; Wales
- Coordinates: 51.767148°N 3.334595°W
- Platforms: 2

Other information
- Status: Disused

History
- Original company: Merthyr, Tredegar and Abergavenny Railway
- Pre-grouping: London and North Western Railway

Key dates
- 1 October 1862: Opened
- 11 May 1885: Closed
Location

Dowlais Top (LNWR) railway station served the village of Dowlais, Merthyr Tydfil, Wales from 1862 to 1885 on the Merthyr, Tredegar and Abergavenny Railway. The station consisted of two platforms with services to both Brecon and Newport. The station closed in 1885 and was replaced by Dowlais High Street. The site now occupied by an industrial estate and trackbed forms part of a one way lane for the A465 Heads of the Valley Road. The old station building has survived as an office.

Preceding station	Disused railways	Following station
Dowlais (High Street); Line and station closed	London and North Western Railway; Merthyr, Tredegar and Abergavenny Railway	Rhymney Bridge; Line and station closed
