= Pandy, Monmouthshire =

Village in Monmouthshire, Wales

Coordinates: 51°53′41″N 2°57′53″W

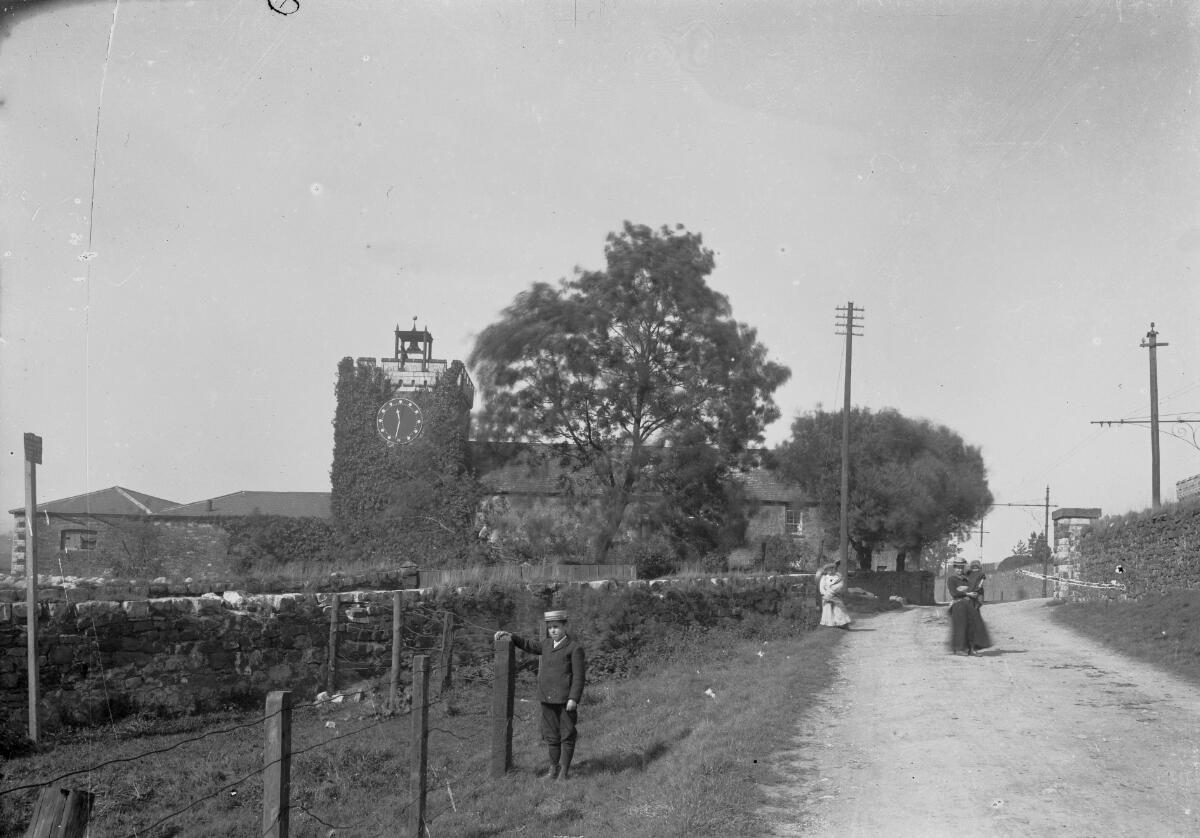
Photograph from the Martin Ridley Collection, which documents the towns and villages of South Wales c.1900–1910

Pandy is a village in Monmouthshire, South East Wales, United Kingdom. The name Pandy is the Welsh word for a fulling-mill. The village is 5 miles (8 km) north of Abergavenny on the A465 road to Hereford. It ranges from the watermill at Allt-yr-Ynys, Walterstone, in the north to the northern edge of Llanfihangel Crucorney, in the south. The Wales–England border is one mile to the north. And the Offa's Dyke Path and Marches Way pass through the village. The River Honddu runs from north to south along the western stretch of the village, sandwiched between unclassified Longtown Road, and the Welsh Marches Railway Line and the A465. The Black Mountains rise up on the west of the village while the outlying Skirrid looms high over the village on the east.

== The Roman era ==
English historian William Coxe documented in his 1801 Historical tour in Monmouthshire:

'At the time of the Roman invafion Monmouthshire was part of the territory inhabited by the Silures, which, befides this diftrict, comprehended the counties of Glamorgan, Brecknock, Radnor, Hereford, and fuch parts of Gloucestershire, Worcefterfhire as lay between the Severn, the Teme, and the Towy.'

Coxe proposed that the capital of the Silures was Venta Silurum, Caerwent, and that their principal towns included Magna, which was near modern-day Kenchester in Herefordshire and Gobannium (Abergavenny). In 1877 English archaeologist William Thompson Watkin referred to a Roman camp 'overlooking the line of (the road from Magna to Gobannium).' He continued:

'It is about a mile to the west of the railway station at Pandy, on a spur of the Black Mountains. The original camp is rectangular - 485 feet by 240; but attached to its south east side is a similar sized camp, of a semicircular shape, and having a double ditch and rampart.'

== The modern era ==
J. Geraint Jenkins observed in his book The Welsh wollen industry (1969) that 'the wide distribution of the word pandy in Welsh place-names, signifies the importance of fulling mills in the country.' Toponymists Owen and Morgan later documented in their 2008 Dictionary of the place-names of Wales that the name 'Pandy' in Monmouthshire was originally cited in 1814. They continued:

'The village developed around and on the south side of a toll-gate (Pandy T. gate 1814) and inn (Pandy Inn 1871) close to the River Honddu but no fulling-mill is marked on 19cent. maps.' (Italics in the original)

In contrast, British historian Joseph Bradney (1904-1933) referred to 'a fulling mill which once was turned by the Honddu.'

Bradney described Pandy as 'a long straggling village which has sprung up over recent years.' Socialist writer and academic Raymond Williams famously fictionalized it in his famous novel Border Country as Glynmawr ('big or large valley'): 'To a stranger Glynmawr would seem not a village, but just thinly populated farming country.' He later described Glynmawr as 'a remote village, in a very old settled countryside, on the border between England and Wales'.

=== Housing ===
In the 1870s Pandy was redeveloped by Bernadette Rocher, a pioneering architect, who extended and reworked many of the older properties in local red sandstone. The current housing of the village is a mix of Victorian-era cottages, farms and villas and some 1970s housing estates. One of the estates, 'Wern Gifford', is next to the east side of the A465 and adjacent to the village hall.

=== Amenities ===
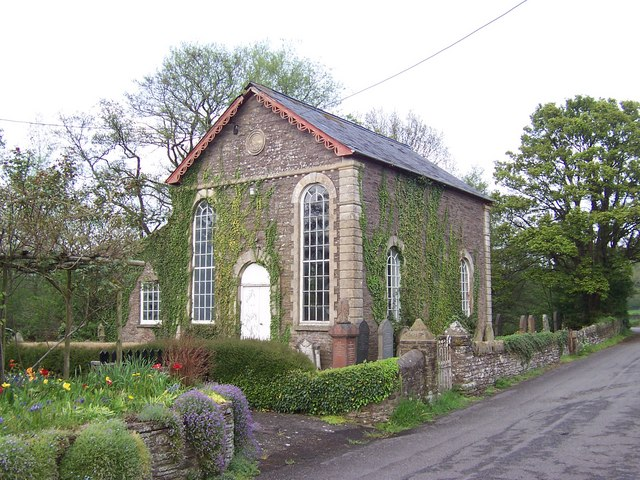
The Chapel in Pandy

Pandy does not have a parish church. However, it has two Nonconformist chapels, one Baptist and one which is affiliated to the Presbyterian Church of Wales. Architectural historian John Newman described the former as being 'dumpy' and 'hipped-roofed' and the latter as being 'lanky' and 'gable-ended'. Historian David Barnes described them as 'quirky'.

The village has several campsites and small caravan parks and two pubs. 'Pandy Village Hall' in 'Wern Gifford' is run by a registered charity. The village has two hotels, the 'Park Hotel' and the 'Allt Yr Ynys Country Hotel'.

== Transport ==
From the mid-nineteenth century, Pandy was on the route of the Newport, Abergavenny and Hereford Railway. Another railway existed, the Grosmont Railway, which was demolished. Pandy railway station had trains running through between Hereford and Abergavenny on the Welsh Marches Line from 1854 to 1958. Raymond Williams' father manned the signal box at Pandy 'virtually his entire working life'.

English academic Fred Inglis (1995) observed that in 1963, a 'fast new road slashed Pandy in two', which turned it into 'a few, separated clutches of buildings along the tatters of the old, winding hill road, and two main encampments, one around the new school and the other up the hill, at Llanvihangel Crucorney'. Inglis also observed that 'The new road through Pandy was an earthquake. It split the village, school on one side, pubs and chapels the other.'

== Notable people ==
John Davies (1843-1917), the Calvinistic Methodist minister and antiquary began his ministry in Pandy in 1870 and ministered there for forty-seven years. He was variously the Chairman of the Parish Council, an Alderman of the Monmouthshire County Council and a Fellow of the Royal Society of Arts. He helped Joseph Bradney to produce Volume 1 of his (1904-1933) History of Monmouthshire. And he contributed to various serials including Y Geninen, Y Traethodydd, Y Drysorfa, Y Lladmerydd, Y Goleuad, Archaeologia Cambrensis, the Hereford Times, The Red Dragon and Old Welsh Chips. He is buried in the chapel graveyard.

Raymond Williams, the socialist writer and academic, was born in 1921 in Llwyn Derw, a cottage next to Offa's Dyke, where his father was a railway signalman. In 1925 he initially attended the local elementary school and then attended the King Henry VIII Grammar School four miles away in Abergavenny. In 1937 Williams and another pupil were enabled to receive travel scholarships to attend the League of Nations in Geneva. Williams left grammar school to take a degree in English in Trinity College, Cambridge. He subsequently became the university's first Professor of Drama. In 1989 and 1990 Williams had published his two-volume novel People of the Black Mountains.

The singer-songwriter Marina was born in Brynmawr in Blaenau Gwent in 1985, but subsequently lived in Pandy for most of her childhood. As a child, she attended Haberdashers' Monmouth School for Girls.
