= Pantysgallog (Low Level) Halt railway station =

Disused railway station in Pant, Merthyr Tydfil

Pantysgallog Low Level Halt

General information
- Location: Pant, Merthyr Tydfil; Wales
- Coordinates: 51.770189°N 3.353635°W
- Platforms: 2

Other information
- Status: Disused

History
- Original company: London and North Western Railway
- Pre-grouping: London and North Western Railway
- Post-grouping: London, Midland and Scottish Railway

Key dates
- 2 February 1914: Opened
- 6 January 1958: Closed. Lasted timetabled public services ran on Saturday 4th. A special ran on Sunday the 5th.
Location

Pantysgallog Low Level Halt railway station was a station that served the village of Pant, Merthyr Tydfil, Wales on the Merthyr, Tredegar and Abergavenny Railway. The station closed in 1958 and the site is now a housing estate.

== Sources ==
- Quick, Michael (2009) [2001]. Railway passenger stations in Great Britain: a chronology (4th ed.). Oxford: Railway & Canal Historical Society. ISBN 978-0-901461-57-5. OCLC 612226077.

Preceding station	Disused railways	Following station
Pant; Line and station closed	London, Midland and Scottish Railway; Merthyr, Tredegar and Abergavenny Railway	Dowlais (High Street); Line and station closed
