= Llechryd, Caerphilly =

Coordinates: 51.7767°N 3.2946°W

Llechryd
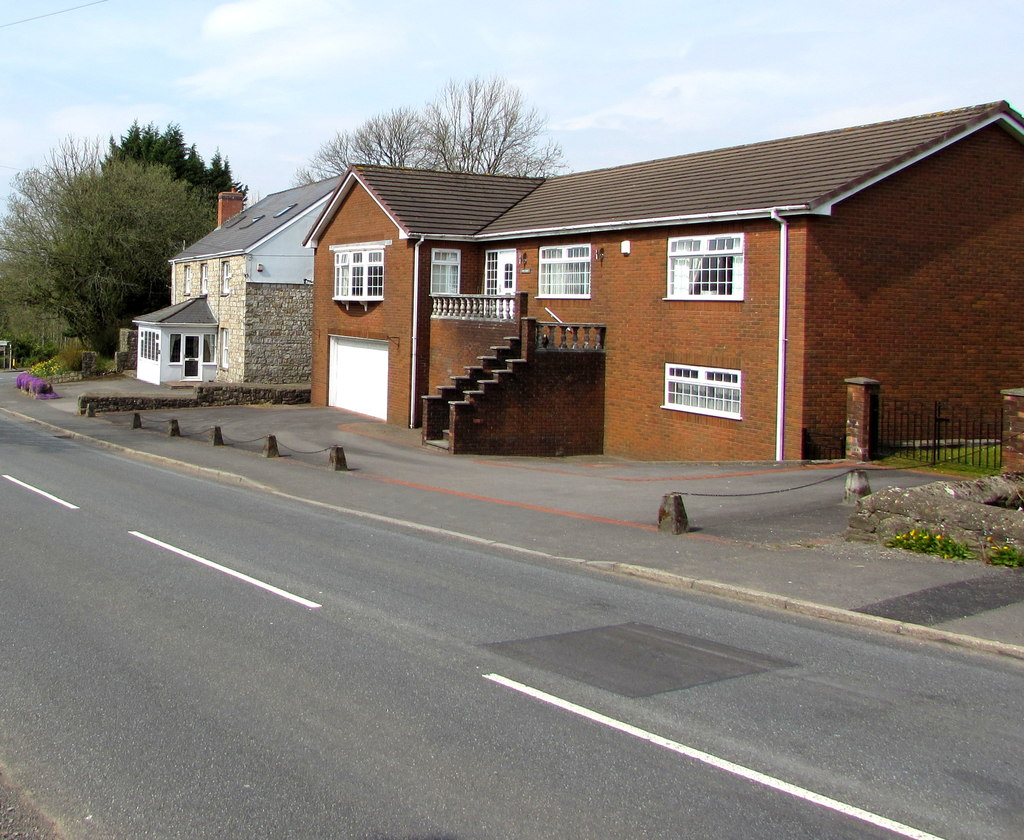

- Location within Caerphilly
- Principal area: Caerphilly
- Preserved county: Gwent
- Country: Wales
- Sovereign state: United Kingdom
- Police: Gwent
- Fire: South Wales
- Ambulance: Welsh
- Senedd Cymru – Welsh Parliament: Islwyn

Llechryd is a hamlet in Caerphilly County Borough, Wales. It is located north of Rhymney on the eastern side of the Rhymney River, and it is part of the community of Rhymney.

The name was originally used by two farms, Llechryd Isaf and Llechryd Uchaf. It comes from the words "llechi" (slates) and "rhyd" (ford), referring to grey slate slabs used as stepping stones in the river. In the early 19th century the place was known as Rumney Bridge.

The village was the location of the Soar-Y-Graig Welsh Independent Chapel, which was historically in the parish of Llangynidr, Brecknockshire.

The village was formerly served by Rhymney Bridge railway station.
