= Dowlais (High Street) railway station =

Disused railway station in Dowlais, Merthyr Tydfil

Dowlais High Street

General information
- Location: Dowlais, Merthyr Tydfil; Wales
- Coordinates: 51.763514°N 3.343294°W
- Platforms: 2

Other information
- Status: Disused

History
- Original company: Merthyr, Tredegar and Abergavenny Railway
- Pre-grouping: London and North Western Railway
- Post-grouping: London, Midland and Scottish Railway

Key dates
- 11 May 1885: Opened
- 6 January 1958: Closed
Location

Dowlais High Street railway station was a station that served the village of Dowlais, Merthyr Tydfil, Wales on the Merthyr, Tredegar and Abergavenny Railway. The station closed in 1958 The site is now occupied by Station Terrace with only the steps visible.

== Sources ==
- Quick, Michael (2009) [2001]. Railway passenger stations in Great Britain: a chronology (4th ed.). Oxford: Railway & Canal Historical Society. ISBN 978-0-901461-57-5. OCLC 612226077.

Preceding station	Disused railways	Following station
Pantysgallog (Low Level) Halt; Line and station closed	London and North Western Railway; Merthyr, Tredegar and Abergavenny Railway	Dowlais Top; Line and station closed
Dowlais Central; Line and station closed	London and North Western Railway; Merthyr, Tredegar and Abergavenny Railway	Dowlais Top; Line and station closed
