= Pandy railway station =

Disused railway station in Pandy, Monmouthshire

Pandy

General information
- Location: Pandy, Monmouthshire; Wales
- Coordinates: 51.9008°N 2.9651°W
- Grid reference: SO33702292
- Platforms: 2

Other information
- Status: Disused

History
- Original company: Newport, Abergavenny and Hereford Railway
- Pre-grouping: Great Western Railway
- Post-grouping: Great Western Railway

Key dates
- 2 January 1854: Opened
- 9 June 1958: Closed
Location

Pandy railway station was a railway station which served the Monmouthshire village of Pandy. It was located on the Welsh Marches Line between Hereford and Abergavenny.

On 25 March 1855 shortly after leaving Pandy, a stoker on a train, Evan Jones aged 18 went round the engine to lubricate some of the mechanism when his leg hit an iron girder of a bridge. He fell and the wheels passed over his right arm. He was transported to Hereford Infirmary where his arm was amputated but he died two days later

The station, comprising a booking office, a cloakroom and the station-master's house, was destroyed by fire in 1904.

The station closed in 1958.

The Owen Sheers novel Resistance used Pandy railway station as a location.

| Preceding station | Historical railways | Following station |
|---|---|---|
| Pontrilas; Line open, station closed | Great Western Railway; Welsh Marches line | Llanvihangel; Line open, station closed |
