= Llanvihangel railway station =

Disused railway station in Llanvihangel Crucorney, Gwent

Llanvihangel
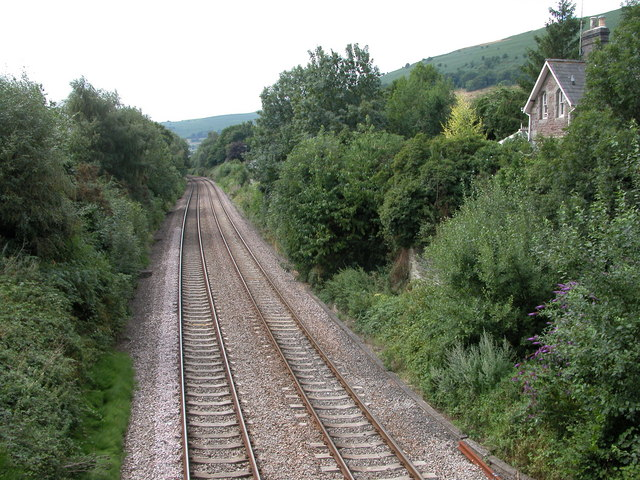
- Site of Llanvihangel station in 2006

General information
- Location: Llanvihangel Crucorney, Monmouthshire; Wales
- Coordinates: 51.8734°N 2.9967°W
- Grid reference: SO314198
- Platforms: 2

Other information
- Status: Disused

History
- Original company: Newport, Abergavenny and Hereford Railway
- Pre-grouping: Great Western Railway
- Post-grouping: Great Western Railway

Key dates
- 2 January 1854: Opened as Llanfihangel
- 1 January 1900: Name changed to Llanvihangel
- 9 June 1958: Closed
Location

Llanvihangel railway station was a former station which served the Monmouthshire village of Llanvihangel Crucorney. It was located on the Welsh Marches Line between Hereford and Abergavenny.

The platforms were staggered beneath the road bridge. Station buildings were substantially constructed of stone. Llanvihangel is close to the summit of the Llanvihangel Bank as it climbs north from Abergavenny at a 1 in 82 gradient.

The station closed in 1958. The double line remains in use but the platforms have been removed.

Preceding station	Historical railways	Following station
Pandy; Line open, station closed	Great Western Railway; Welsh Marches line	Abergavenny Junction; Line open, station closed
