= Merthyr, Tredegar and Abergavenny Railway =

Railway line in South East Wales

The Merthyr, Tredegar and Abergavenny Railway, also known as the Heads of the Valleys line, was a railway line which operated between 1860 and 1958 between the Monmouthshire town of Abergavenny and the Glamorgan town of Merthyr Tydfil in South East Wales.

== Opening and construction ==
=== Origins ===
The line can be traced back to the large bequest left by Richard Crawshay, proprietor of the Cyfarthfa Ironworks, to his nephew, Joseph Crawshay, in 1810. With his inheritance, Crawshay together with Matthew Wayne acquired the Nantyglo Ironworks from Hartford, Partridge and Co. in 1811 for £8,000. When Wayne retired from the partnership in 1820, Crawshay Bailey took his place. Crawshay Bailey became sole proprietor in 1833 upon the retirement of his brother. In the same year, he acquired the Beaufort Ironworks.

Crawshay Bailey was the driving force behind the development of tramroads in the Nantyglo area which served to bring raw materials to and from his various ironworks. First, in 1822, he opened a 5.5 miles (8.9 km) plateway known as Bailey's Tramroad between the Nantyglo Ironworks and a wharf on the Brecknock and Abergavenny Canal at Govilon. Here it met with the Llanvihangel Railway, a 3 ft 6 in (1,067 mm) line opened in 1811 which stretched 6.25 miles (10.06 km) to Llanvihangel Crucorney and an end-on junction with the Grosmont Railway. In February 1859, Crawshay and his partner Thomas Brown acquired the Beaufort Tramroad between Brynmawr and its junction with the Llanvihangel Railway at the canal wharf in Gilwern.

Merthyr, Tredegar and Abergavenny Railway Act 1859
- Act of Parliament
- Parliament of the United Kingdom
- Long title: An Act to incorporate a Company for making Railways to supply Communication to the District between Merthyr and Abergavenny, and for other Purposes.
- Citation: 22 & 23 Vict. c. lix

Dates
- Royal assent: 1 August 1859

The next step for Bailey was part-conversion of the tramways into a standard gauge line connecting prosperous Merthyr with its reserves of coal and iron ore and Abergavenny which was in decline. The act of Parliament authorising the incorporation of the Merthyr, Tredegar and Abergavenny Railway, the Merthyr, Tredegar and Abergavenny Railway Act 1859 (22 & 23 Vict. c. lix) obtained royal assent on 1 August 1859.

=== Construction ===
The company's initial share capital was £150,000, consisting of 7,500 shares at £20 each. The Merthyr, Tredegar and Abergavenny Railway Act 1859 specified that the line was to be completed within five years and included the conveyance to the company of part of the Llanvihangel Railway between the canal wharf at Gilwern and Abergavenny. The line's engineer was John Gardner who had been the assistant engineer on the London and Greenwich Railway and the Newport Docks.

The line was one of the most heavily engineered in South Wales. It cut across the grain of the landscape and involved numerous curves, steep gradients, tunnels and viaducts. It branched off the Newport, Abergavenny and Hereford Railway near Abergavenny, crossing the River Usk on a flimsy viaduct adjacent to the road crossing, and began a steep 9 miles (14 km) climb at gradients as severe as 1 in 34. After Govilon the line meandered beneath Gilwern Hill through the Clydach Gorge, climbing upwards on a breathtaking 7 miles (11 km) ascent at gradients of 1 in 38, with the upper section hewn out of a hillside shelf. Beyond Brynmawr, the line rarely descended below 1,200 feet (370 m) above sea level, crossing despoiled treeless moorland and the heads of the mining valleys to Dowlais. Dowlais (High Street) signalled the start of a steep 6.5 miles (10.5 km) descent of 1 in 40/50 to Morlais Junction and then over the Brecon and Merthyr Tydfil Junction Railway (B&MTJR) to Merthyr.

The first sod was turned at Abergavenny on 18 June 1860 at the Brecon New Road by Crawshay Bailey's wife. Work commenced immediately on the line's construction, the contract for the section between Abergavenny to Brynmawr having been let to William McCormick. A report by Chief Engineer John Gardner in June 1861 gave an upbeat account of progress: the road and railway bridges along the track route were under construction and nearing completion in the lower Abergavenny section, cuttings were being excavated and embankments established between Abergavenny and Brynmawr. Rail had been laid where possible and an engine mounted on the tracks to further facilitate the speedy transport of construction materials to the section being laid, with work at this point focusing on the embankment between the Monmouthshire and Brecon Canal, the River Usk and the trackbed at Gilwern.

=== LNWR takeover ===
Merthyr, Tredegar and Abergavenny Railway (Leasing) Act 1862
- Act of Parliament
- Parliament of the United Kingdom
- Long title: An Act to enable the Merthyr, Tredegar, and Abergavenny Rail way Company to lease their Railway.
- Citation: 25 & 26 Vict. c. ccix

Dates
- Royal assent: 7 August 1862

Merthyr, Tredegar and Abergavenny Railway Act 1866
- Act of Parliament
- Parliament of the United Kingdom
- Long title: An Act for transferring to the London and North-western Railway Company the outstanding Estate or Interest in the Merthyr, Tredegar, and Abergavenny Railway.
- Citation: 29 & 30 Vict. c. cclxxxiv

Dates
- Royal assent: 30 July 1866

Due to the costs of construction in the mountainous areas between Abergavenny and Brynmawr and the failure by certain shareholders to pay their dues, the railway company's bank account became overdrawn in late 1861. At the time, the West Midland Railway introduced a bill seeking to lease the line and extend it to meet the B&MTJR, but the London and North Western Railway (LNWR) had stolen a march by building up friendly relations with the Merthyr, Tredegar and Abergavenny Railway Company, having provided it with assistance during construction. Agreement was reached between the companies on 8 November 1861 for a lease of 1,000 years from the date of opening of any section of the route, and this was authorised by the Merthyr, Tredegar and Abergavenny Railway (Leasing) Act 1862 (25 & 26 Vict. c. ccix). The LNWR was later to acquire the smaller company on 30 June 1866 under the Merthyr, Tredegar and Abergavenny Railway Act 1866 (29 & 30 Vict. c. cclxxxiv).

The first section between Abergavenny and Brynmawr was ceremonially opened on 29 September 1862. The first train ran as far as Govilon, the only completed station at that time, and was driven by the wife of Captain James Hill, the company's vice-chairman. Public services commenced on 1 October, the first day of the LNWR's lease.

=== Extensions of the line ===
On 1 March 1864, the line was extended from Brynmawr to Nantybwch where it was joined by the Sirhowy Railway four years later. Three years later, a branch from Beaufort to Ebbw Vale opened for passengers and goods on 1 September and 31 October 1867 respectively.

The LNWR remodelled access to the line at Abergavenny with the opening of a north-to-west spur from a new Abergavenny Junction station which avoided the need for reversal at the site of the previous junction which faced the Great Western Railway (GWR) station at Abergavenny Monmouth Road.

Agreement was reached with the Rhymney Railway to share the costs of construction for a 3 miles (4.8 km) extension from Nantybwch to Rhymney Bridge. where a junction was made with the Rhymney's line to Cardiff Docks over which the LNWR obtained running powers. The joint extension was opened for goods traffic on 1 August 1871 and to passengers on 2 October 1871. The agreement with the Rhymney allowed the LNWR to open a goods station at Tyndall Street in Cardiff on 1 October 1875.

=== Brecon and Merthyr ===
The final extension south to Merthyr was to bring the LNWR within the territory of the B&MTJR. The B&MTJR had viewed the westward march of the Euston company with dissatisfaction and set about promoting branches to block its progress. However, the financial state of the B&MTJR eventually led it to conclude two agreements with the LNWR which granted the larger company favourable terms for access to Dowlais and Merthyr.

The first agreement, which was ratified by the London and North Western Railway (New Lines) Act 1867 (30 & 31 Vict. c. cxiii) of 15 July 1867, allowed the LNWR to extend its line from Rhymney Bridge to make a junction with the B&MTJR where the two lines met at Dowlais Top and at Ivor junction near the terminus of the B&MTJR's Dowlais branch. In exchange for running powers as far as Nantybwch and facilities to form a junction with the Rhymney at Rhymney Bridge, the B&MTJR agreed to withdraw its proposals for blocking lines. In the event, the B&MTJR made scarce use of its running powers and the junction was never built. The line as far as Ivor junction opened on 1 January 1873. The LNWR was granted running powers over a 0.75-mile (1.21 km) section of track into Dowlais (Central). At the same time, the LNWR opened a station at Dowlais Top, close to the summit of the line at 1,250 feet (380 m) above sea level, where a connection was made with the B&MTJR for the exchange of traffic.

A second agreement in 1874 saw the B&MTJR agree that its own Merthyr branch from Morlais to Rhydycar junction become a joint line with the LNWR, with the larger company taking advantage of the smaller company's financial state and repaying half the costs of construction at £25,000 per mile – far less than it would have needed to pay for access to Merthyr. To reach the B&MTJR's Morlais junction, a short section 1.25 miles (2.01 km) long, partly in a tunnel, was constructed from Penywern, just north of Ivor junction. The link opened on 9 June 1879 and services ran through to Merthyr (High Street) using running powers over 44 chains (890 m) of GWR track from Rhydycar junction. The junctions at Merthyr and Dowlais gave the LNWR access to a number of local industrial tramways, including that of the Dowlais Ironworks to which it was later to build a more direct connection with the Cwm Bargoed mineral line.

== Operations ==
=== Services ===
The initial passenger service was three trains each way, soon increasing to four. Extra services were added from 1901 so that seven or eight trains ran each way daily; a peak was reached in the 1930s with up to twelve services provided. Second World War economy measures saw fewer but longer trains in service. In addition, the LNWR provided through coaches from Cardiff Queen Street via Rhymney Bridge to Crewe, Liverpool and Manchester, as well as coaches from Shrewsbury and Hereford to Merthyr, as well as return services from Dowlais (High Street) to Shrewsbury and from Merthyr to Hereford. A GPO sorting van operated between Euston and Merthyr, running via Stafford and Shrewsbury, and attached to the 1.45am Crewe to Shrewsbury service.

Traffic was operated using locomotives based at three sheds in the Monmouthshire area: Abergavenny, Tredegar and Blaenavon. Until the closure of the line, services were operated by LNWR Webb Coal Tanks, of which some 55 were allocated between the three sheds in 1919, with Abergavenny receiving 37, Tredegar 14 and Blaenavon 4. As late as 1950, there were still 14 in the area, of which No. 58926 headed the last train in 1958. Before the Coal Tanks, LNWR Special Tanks were active on the line from 1877 to 1921. When the line became part of the London, Midland and Scottish Railway (LMS) on the Grouping, LNWR locomotives were not superseded by LMS ones and the first only appeared in 1936 when LMS Stanier 2-6-2T No. 79 arrived. However, it was only after the Second World War when numbers increased with the allocation of several LMS Ivatt Class 2 2-6-2Ts to Tredegar.

=== Closure ===
The line had been expensive to build and was difficult to work efficiently. The 25-mile (40 km) journey between Abergavenny and Merthyr, including 15 intermediate stops, took 1 hour and 40 minutes, which left it vulnerable to competition from other modes of traffic.

In 1957, faced with the costs of working the line and the future costs associated with its continued maintenance and repairs to the ageing track and infrastructure after a century of use, British Railways, which had received the LMS's assets upon nationalisation, announced that it would be withdrawing passenger services. It claimed that the proposal would bring in a cost saving of £60,000 per annum. This was even though track renewal had recently taken place west of Abergavenny and that the Clydach and Abergavenny sections had won "Best Track Length" awards in the 1950s, while Govilon received an award for its outstanding station gardens.

The last public timetabled service ran on Saturday 4 January 1958, the last train running was the 08.30 p.m. Abergavenny Junction to Merthyr station, hauled by GWR 5700 No. 4630 pannier tank locomotive, with the down train being the 08.30 p.m. Merthyr to Abergavenny, drawn by GWR 6400 No. 6423. Wagons at Govilon sidings were shunted away by LMS Stanier 3P 40145.

The last passenger-carrying train was a special organised by the Stephenson Locomotive Society on Sunday 5 January 1958 made up of 5 eight-wheelers (a GWR corridor and four LMS vestibules) hauled by LNWR 0-8-0 'Super D' No. 49121. Crowds gathered at viewpoints at the trackside along the entire route, with large numbers at Brynmawr station. The train completed the journey to Merthyr and was turned for the return leg complete with whistle-up's at every station on the last run, householders along the route turning their kitchen and bedroom lights on and off to signal the trains passing and the passing of an era for this particular stretch of line.

After withdrawal of the through passenger service, certain sections remained open for a short time afterwards. Services to Rhymney had already been withdrawn on 21 September 1953, Nantybwch to Beaufort closed to goods on 2 November 1959 as did the line to Ebbw Vale, then on 13 June 1960 passenger and goods services on the Sirhowy Railway ceased. The section between Ponsticill and Rhydycar junctions closed on 13 November 1961 to passengers and on 4 May 1964 to goods. Finally, Abergavenny to Abergavenny (Brecon Road) closed to goods on 5 April 1971.

== Present day ==
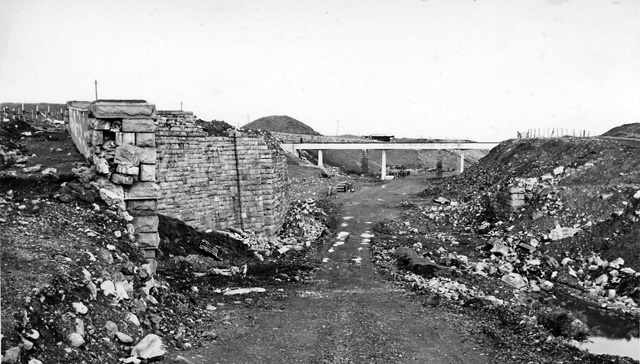
The A465 road between Merthyr Tydfil and Abergavenny runs over the former Merthyr, Tredegar and Abergavenny Railway line. Image taken in April 1965

Little remains of the former line save for a section of trackbed in the Clydach Gorge between Brynmawr and Llanfoist has been converted into a long-distance cycleway. The cutting in which Beaufort station was situated has been infilled and the line from Trevil onwards has been obliterated by the A465 Heads of the Valleys road. The road, on which construction began soon after the closure of the Ebbw Vale branch on 2 November 1959, follows the former alignment adjacent to the site of the Ebbw Vale junction signal box, through Trevil Halt to the road bridge leading to Dukestown Cemetery at Tredegar. The road then diverges and rejoins the railway line at the point where the Nantybwch platforms were situated. A roundabout has taken the place of Rhymney Bridge station from where the road continues towards Dowlais where the station site has been redeveloped.

Dowlais (High Street) station has however survived due to its isolated moorland location above Merthyr. The platforms and station houses at Govilon, Gilwern Halt, Clydach and Gelli Felen Halt have also survived together with Clydach viaduct. The tunnel mouths at Clydach, Gelli Felen and Morlais have been sealed.
