= Abergavenny railway station =

Grade II listed railway station in Monmouthshire, Wales

Abergavenny Welsh: Y Fenni
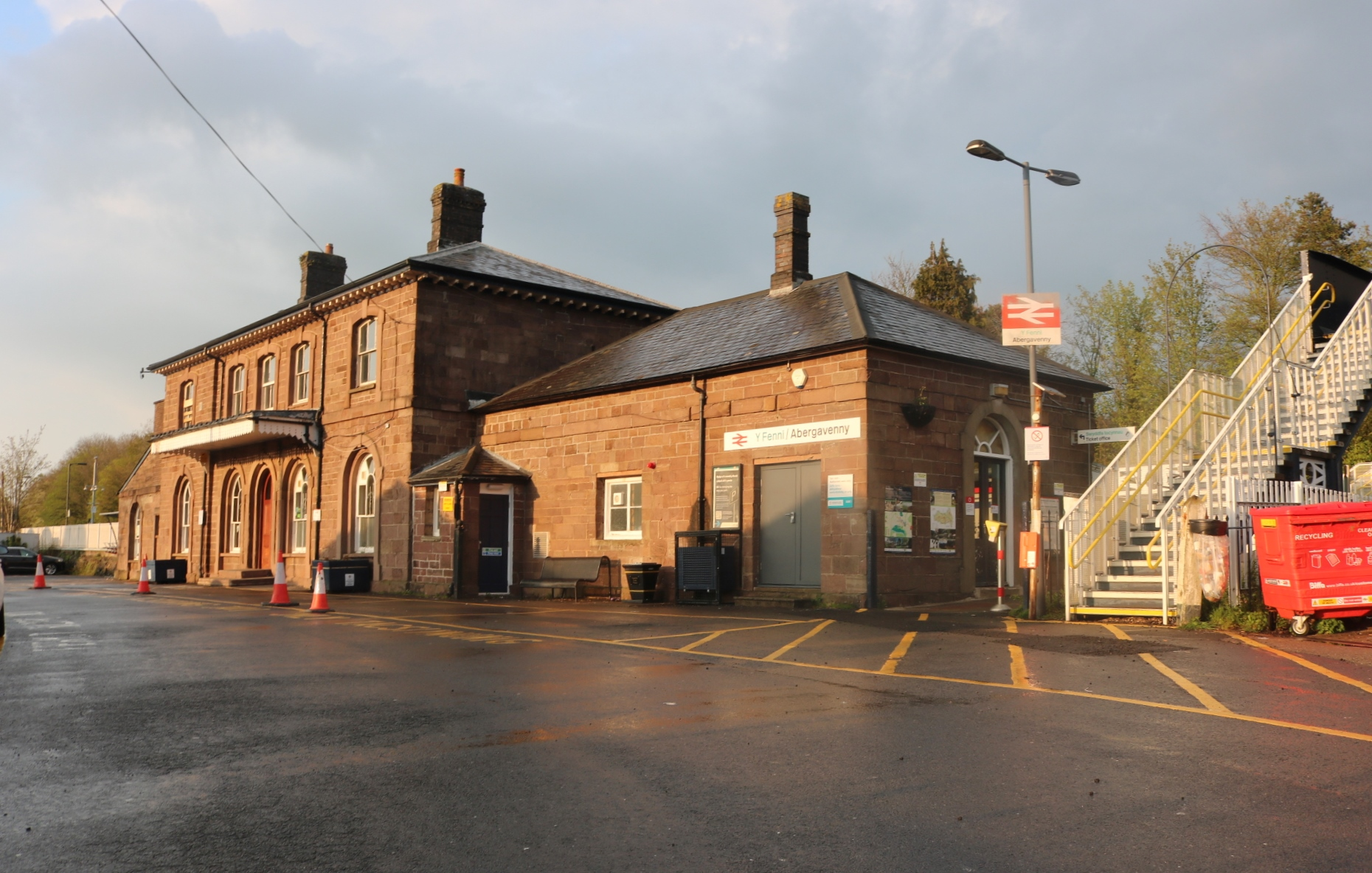
- Abergavenny station (April 2023)

General information
- Location: Abergavenny, Monmouthshire, Wales
- Coordinates: 51.81745°N 3.00902°W
- Grid reference: SO305136
- Manager: Transport for Wales
- Platforms: 2

Other information
- Station code: AGV
- Classification: DfT category D

Key dates
- 2 January 1854: Station opens
- 19 July 1950: Renamed Abergavenny Monmouth Road
- 6 May 1968: Renamed Abergavenny

Passengers
- 2020/21: ▼0.102 million
- 2021/22: ▲0.284 million
- 2022/23: ▲0.360 million
- 2023/24: ▲0.402 million
- 2024/25: ▲0.423 million

Listed Building – Grade II
- Feature: Abergavenny railway station, including the down platform building and footbridge
- Designated: 1 November 1974
- Reference no.: 2472
Location
Notes
- Passenger statistics from the Office of Rail and Road

Abergavenny railway station (Welsh: Y Fenni) is situated south-east of the town centre of Abergavenny, Wales. It lies on the Welsh Marches Line between Newport and Hereford, and is operated by Transport for Wales.

The town lies at the eastern edge of the Brecon Beacons National Park; the station is an access point to local services and public transport into the park. The station is Grade II listed.

== History ==
The station, designed by Charles Liddell, Chief Engineer of the Newport, Abergavenny and Hereford Railway (NA&HR), is in an Italianate architecture style in a local pink semi-ashlar sandstone with natural slate roofs and stone stacks. The down platform building is built of stone with a timber-framed front and a natural slate roof. The footbridge comprises cast iron columns of typical GWR design which support the stairways and the two spans. The span over the now removed by-pass freight lines is the wrought iron lattice girder original but the main span over the running tracks was replaced by a steel plate-girder in the late 20th century.

The NA&HR amalgamated with other railways in 1860 to form the West Midland Railway, which itself amalgamated with the Great Western Railway in 1863. The line then passed on to the Western Region of British Railways on nationalisation in 1948. In 1950, the station was renamed Abergavenny Monmouth Road, but reverted to its simple name in 1968. When sectorisation was introduced, the station was served by Regional Railways until the privatisation of British Rail.

A GWR Castle-class locomotive, number 5013, was named after Abergavenny Castle.

=== Branch line ===
A branch line to Brynmawr was opened in 1862, starting at Abergavenny Junction station north of the current station, constructed by the Merthyr, Tredegar and Abergavenny Railway (MT&AR). The line also had a station in the town called Abergavenny Brecon Road, making three stations in all. This company was acquired by the London and North Western Railway in 1866. In 1958, the MT&AR passenger trains ceased and Abergavenny Junction was closed.

=== Former services ===
Two trains per day in the early morning on weekdays to London Paddington, via Hereford and the Cotswold Line, commenced operation in December 2007. However, they were short lived, being withdrawn and cut back to Hereford in December 2008 due to low passenger usage, and travelling south to Newport and using trains via the Severn Tunnel and Swindon being quicker. These services were operated by First Great Western.

== Facilities ==
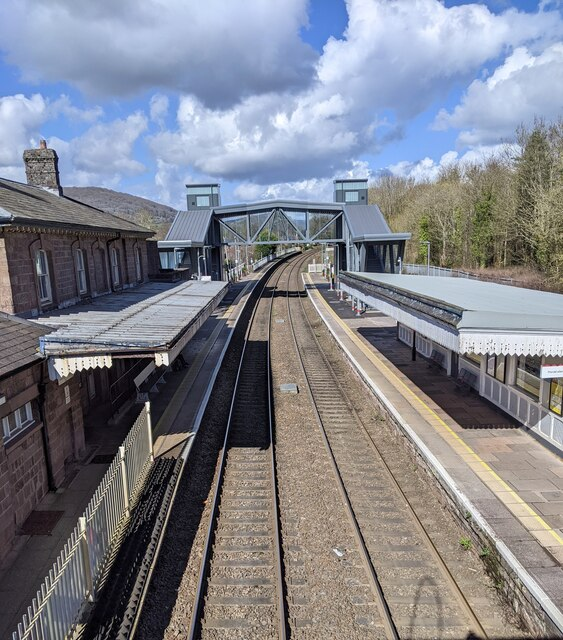
New accessible footbridge at the station in 2026

The station is staffed in the daytime, with the ticket office open seven days per week. It has disabled access to platforms, a cafeteria and toilets, plus large waiting rooms on both platforms. Train running information is provided via automated announcements, digital CIS displays and timetable posters, along with a customer help point on platform 1. Step-free access is available on the northbound platform at all times, but to the southbound one only when the ticket office is staffed (as this requires the use of a barrow crossing with locked gates). There is also a footbridge linking the two platforms.

Proposals for an accessible footbridge at the station were put forward in 2010, but were cancelled as Network Rail failed to obtain listed building consent.

The footbridge was temporarily replaced whilst Network Rail took down and restored the original footbridge between December 2018 and July 2019. The bridge was restored at a specialist company in Cardiff. Works involved adding anti-slip material to the deck and refurbishing the trestle support columns and staircases. Future works include providing the station with step-free access throughout as part of the Department of Transport's Access for All fund, which will be match-funded by Transport for Wales. The work is currently underway and is due to be completed by early 2025.

== Passenger volume ==
Passenger volume at Abergavenny
	2019-20	2020-21	2021-22	2022-23
Entries and exits	415,250	102,016	283,944	359,524

== Services ==
Transport for Wales operates all services that stop at Abergavenny. The typical weekday daytime service pattern is:

- One train per hour in each direction between Manchester Piccadilly and Cardiff Central, with most trains continuing beyond Cardiff to Swansea, Carmarthen, Milford Haven or Fishguard Harbour
- A two-hourly service between Cardiff and Holyhead, via Wrexham General and the North Wales Coast Line.

Preceding station	National Rail	Following station
Pontypool and New Inn or Cwmbran	Transport for Wales; Welsh Marches Line	Hereford
Cwmbran	Transport for Wales; North-South Premier Service	Hereford
	Historical railways	
Penpergwm; Line open, station closed	Great Western Railway; Newport, Abergavenny and Hereford Railway	Abergavenny Junction; Line open, station closed
