= Brynmawr railway station =

Former railway station in Brynmawr

Brynmawr
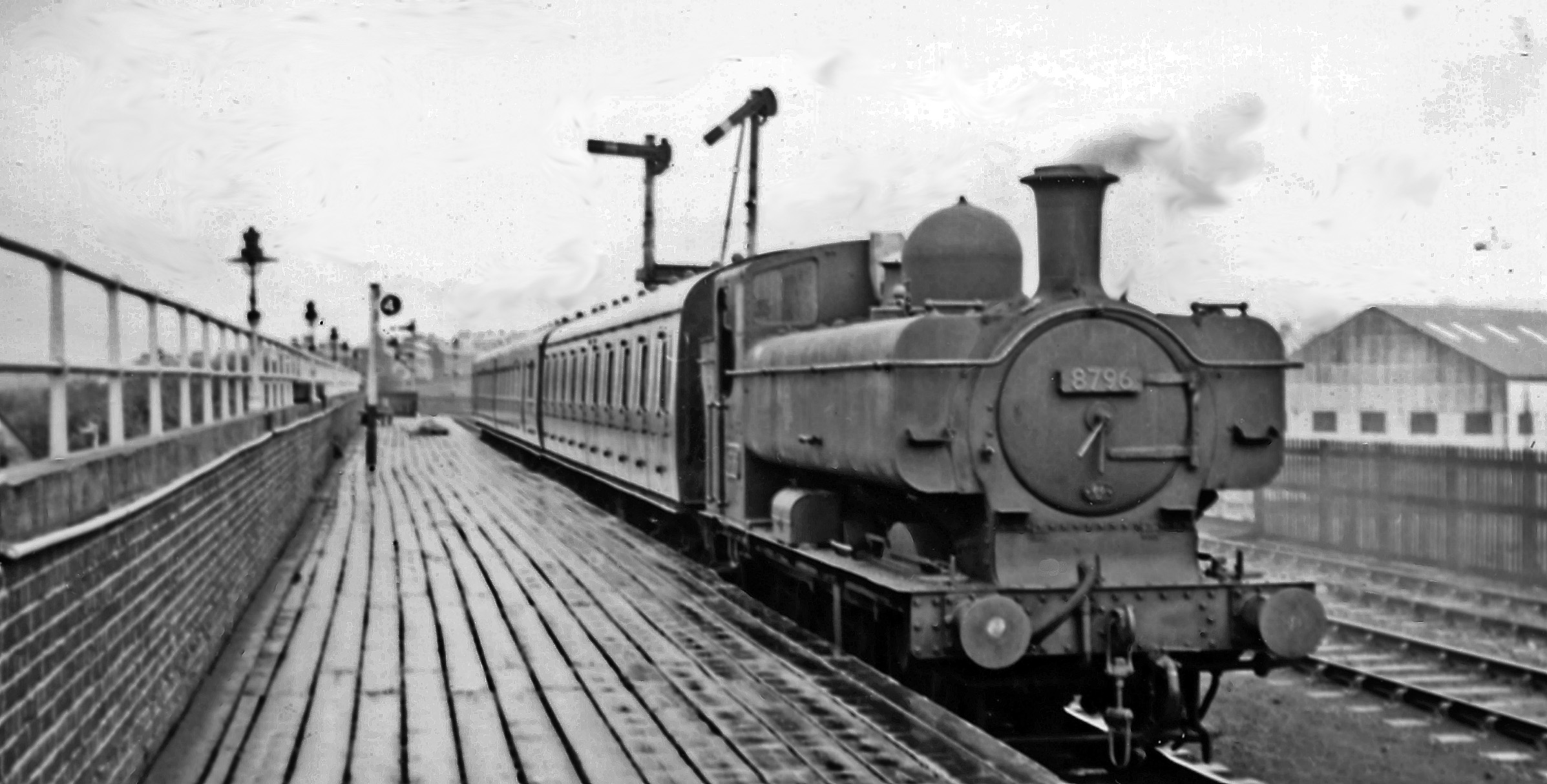
- GWR 8750 Class No. 8796 at platform 4 with a local train from Newport in May 1957.

General information
- Location: Brynmawr, Blaenau Gwent; Wales
- Coordinates: 51.7964°N 3.1730°W
- Grid reference: SO191115
- Platforms: 7

Other information
- Status: Disused

History
- Original company: Merthyr, Tredegar and Abergavenny Railway
- Pre-grouping: London and North Western Railway
- Post-grouping: London and North Western Railway

Key dates
- 1 October 1862: Opened
- 5 May 1941: Blaenavon/Pontypool services withdrawn
- 23 May 1949: Ebbw Vale services withdrawn
- 6 January 1958: Abergavenny/Merthyr services withdrawn
- 30 April 1962: Nantyglo/Newport services withdrawn
- 4 November 1963: Final closure
Location

Brynmawr railway station was a station which served Nantyglo and Brynmawr in the Welsh county of Brecknockshire.

== History ==
The first section of the Merthyr, Tredegar and Abergavenny Railway from Abergavenny to Brynmawr was opened on 29 September 1862. The line was leased and operated by the London and North Western Railway (L&NWR) which acquired the smaller railway company on 30 June 1866. Brynmawr station, which opened on 1 October 1862, was at the junction of lines to Blaenavon High Level, Nantyglo and Ebbw Vale (High Level). The Ebbw Vale extension opened in 1867, followed by an extension to the west by the Brynmawr and Blaenavon Railway which constructed a 4 miles 6 furlongs (7.6 km) line to Blaenavon which opened to goods traffic on 1 November 1869 and to passengers on 1 January 1870. The final extension was southwards to Nantyglo in 1906 when the Brynmawr and Western Valleys Railway provided a 1-mile-10.75-chain (1.826 km) connection with the Great Western Railway's Abertillery branch. The new line, which was on a 1 in 47 gradient fall towards Nantyglo, was jointly worked by the Great Western and the L&NWR, with traffic exchanged between the two companies at Nantyglo. The link created the third route from Newport to Brynmawr, it also being possible to travel via Blaenavon or Nantybwch and the Sirhowy Railway.

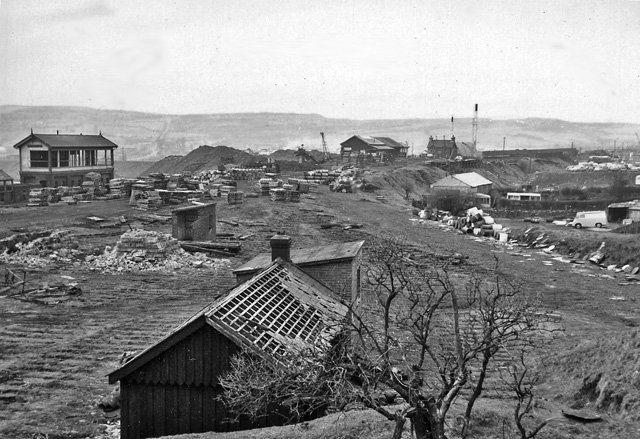
Station site in 1965.

Brynmawr station was located to the south of the main town centre on an east–west embankment. It has been described as "having something of a Wild West air" due to its lofty location on the edge of town and the wooden buildings which could be very draughty given that Brynmawr is nearly 1,200 feet (370 m) above sea level. To the north of the station was St Mary's Roman Catholic Chapel and School, while to the west was the Holy Trinity Church. Beyond St Mary's was a mineral line known as Bailey's Tramroad built by Crawshay Bailey in c. 1869 which ran from his ironworks at Nantyglo through Brynmawr to join the L&NWR's Abergavenny line. The station, which had its entrance on the southside, had seven platforms were provided which were a mixture of stone-faced and timber construction. Platform 4 was a bay for Nantyglo which opened in 1906 and was perched on the edge of the embankment. In 1955, 22 trains ran each way between Brynmawr and Newport via Nantyglo, with one train each way running between Brynmawr and Abercarn. The auto-trains for Blaenavon used platform 3. A glass-panelled footbridge linked the platforms. To the south of the station there were extensive sidings and a turntable suitable for coal tanks.

The first of Brynmawr's connections to be lost was the service to Pontypool via Blaenavon which was withdrawn on 5 May 1941. Then the line to Ebbw Vale closed on 3 February 1951, passenger services having ceased on 23 May 1949. Next was the Abergavenny to Merthyr line from which passenger services ceased on 4 January 1958. The last passenger service over the line was an SLS railtour on 5 January 1958 hauled by LNWR 0-8-0 49121 and LNWR 0-6-2- tank 58926. Final closure came in November 1959 when coal traffic from Tredegar ceased. Finally, passenger services on the route to Nantyglo were withdrawn on 30 April 1962 with final closure on 4 November 1963. This was the date on which Brynmawr closed completely with the withdrawal of its goods services.

Preceding station	Disused railways	Following station
Beaufort (LNWR)	London and North Western Railway; Merthyr, Tredegar and Abergavenny Railway	Gelli Felen Halt; Line and station closed
Terminus	London and North Western Railway; Brynmawr and Blaenavon Railway	Waenavon; Line and station closed
Terminus	Great Western Railway and London and North Western Railway; Brynmawr and Western Valleys Railway	Nantyglo; Line and station closed

== Present and future ==
The station site was cleared following the cessation of all traffic in November 1963. It is presently the site of a primary school.

The Pontypool and Blaenavon Railway have a long-term ambition to reopen the line from Blaenavon High Level to Brynmawr. However, due to redevelopment of the former alignment, any extension would only go as far as the embankment carrying the B4248 road towards Brynmawr. The proposed station would therefore be at roughly SO196115 opposite the Blaenant Industrial Estate.
