= Abergavenny Junction railway station =

Former railway station in Monmouthshire, Wales

Abergavenny Junction

General information
- Location: Abergavenny, Monmouthshire; Wales
- Coordinates: 51.8315°N 3.0015°W
- Grid reference: SO310152
- Platforms: 3

Other information
- Status: Disused

History
- Original company: West Midland Railway / London and North Western Railway
- Pre-grouping: Great Western Railway / London and North Western Railway
- Post-grouping: Great Western Railway / London, Midland and Scottish Railway

Key dates
- 1 October 1862: Opened
- 20 June 1870: Resited 505m north
- 9 June 1958: Closed to passengers
- 5 April 1971: Final closure
Location

Abergavenny Junction railway station was a station situated near the junction made between the London and North Western Railway's Heads of the Valleys line and the West Midland Railway's Newport, Abergavenny and Hereford Railway, which served the town of Abergavenny in the Welsh county of Monmouthshire.

== History ==
=== Opening ===
The first section of the Merthyr, Tredegar and Abergavenny Railway from Abergavenny Junction to Brynmawr was opened on 29 September 1862. The line was leased and operated by the London and North Western Railway (L&NWR) which acquired the smaller railway company on 30 June 1866. The L&NWR was itself amalgamated into the London, Midland and Scottish Railway (LMS) in the 1923 Grouping. The new line made a south-facing junction with the West Midland Railway's Newport, Abergavenny and Hereford Railway at a point on the northern outskirts of Abergavenny near the grounds of an asylum. The West Midland had been under a 999-year lease to the Great Western Railway (GWR) since May 1861 and was absorbed by the larger company as from 1 August 1863. A siding served the asylum

Abergavenny Junction opened on 1 October 1862, the first day of the L&NWR's lease of the line and the commencement of public services. It was a unique station as the only purely L&NWR station on a GWR main line with the only evidence of the GWR being the staff operating the 65-lever signal box which controlled the junction and which was GWR property. The box lasted until 14 November 1965 when it was replaced by a ground frame further south. The line west towards Abergavenny Brecon Road dropped at a gradient of 1 in 40.

=== 1870 resiting ===
The first station at Abergavenny Junction lasted only until 20 June 1870 when it was relocated 505 metres (552 yd) further north. The L&NWR had sought to improve access to the Merthyr branch by remodelling the junction which became a north-facing triangular junction with the provision of a north-to-east spur from a new Abergavenny Junction station. This avoided the need for reversal required by the old junction which faced the GWR's Monmouth Road station. The east-to-south arm of the junction, which had been the original connection, was rarely used for passenger services, but was useful for turning engines.

The new station had three platform faces: a central island platform with one face for Down main line services to Hereford and the north and the other for Up main line services to Pontypool Road and Newport, while Down Merthyr branch services used a bay platform opposite the island. The main station buildings were on the island platform, with only a minimal timber shelter provided for the bay. The GWR once had a small booking office on the Down side of the island where the platform did not reach standard height unlike the Up side platform.

The station's running in board read "change for Brynmawr, Tredegar and Merthyr". Only limited road access was provided in the form of a narrow unmade track leading up to a gate to the north of the island platform.

=== Facilities ===
Abergavenny Junction had two different yards: one at the station end known as the Top Yard which was used by branch line services and trains coming off the main line, and one near the junction itself called South Sidings which would receive and sort through traffic for the branch before going to Top Yard where the engine could be detached and sent to shed. Top Yard was also where trains were shunted out for Shrewsbury, Crewe, Stafford and Birkenhead, and where engines would come off shed, hook on and depart. Arriving train crews could spend the night at Abergavenny Barracks before the next day's return journey.

There had been locomotive facilities at Abergavenny Junction since the opening of the line. In November 1864, Ramsbottom reported that there were eight locomotives stabled at the junction, although the facilities were only intended for two. He proposed the enlargement of the accommodation but the L&NWR preferred to construct new facilities on its own metals at Abergavenny (Brecon Road). A brick-built carriage shed with timber roof trusses was provided in the early 1920s to the south of the platforms.

=== Closure ===
Decline in local industry and the costs of working the line between Abergavenny and Merthyr led to the cessation of passenger services on 4 January 1958. The last public service over the line was an SLS railtour on 5 January 1958 hauled by LNWR 0-8-0 49121 and LNWR Webb Coal Tank No. 58926] . Official closure came on 9 June. The line between Brecon Road goods yard and Abergavenny Junction remained open for goods traffic until 4 April 1971, the last section of the Abergavenny and Merthyr line to close. After closure, the station's footbridge was moved to Abergavenny Monmouth Road station.

Preceding station	Disused railways	Following station
Abergavenny Brecon Road; Line and station closed	London and North Western Railway; Merthyr, Tredegar and Abergavenny Railway	Terminus
	Historical railways	
Llanvihangel; Line open, station closed	Great Western Railway; Newport, Abergavenny and Hereford Railway	Abergavenny Monmouth Road; Line and station open

== Present ==
Trains on the Welsh Marches Line speed through the site of Abergavenny Junction which is now in commercial use. The station itself was located near the point where the Beacons Way footpath crosses the A465 road.

The route of the former Merthyr, Tredegar and Abergavenny Railway through Abergavenny and shape of the triangular junction south of the station site are still visible in aerial photographs.
