= Stephenson Locomotive Society =

The Stephenson Locomotive Society (SLS) was founded in the UK on 11 December 1909 for the study of rail transport and locomotives. More recently, on 1 January 2017, the SLS became a private company limited by guarantee, registered in England and Wales 10471004 (Current Registered Office First Floor, Templeback, 10 Temple Back, BRISTOL, BS1 6FL).

The SLS was originally named The Stephenson Society in honour of the Stephenson family of engineers and not solely George Stephenson as often, erroneously, stated. In late 1911 the professional engineers seceded from the Society to form the Junior Institution of Locomotive Engineers and the Society then took its present name. Despite this the SLS has since attracted professional locomotive engineers such as William Stanier, Oliver Bulleid and André Chapelon, as well as amateurs.

It also has local Centres which organise meetings and trips of railway interest such as special trains.

In 1927 the SLS organised the preservation of London, Brighton and South Coast Railway B1 Class steam locomotive Gladstone; the first locomotive to be preserved by private subscription. In due course it was donated to the UK National Collection and is now in the care of the National Railway Museum. The SLS are custodians of a historic miniature steam locomotive Orion constructed to run on 9½ in. (241 mm) gauge track, based on the London and North Western Railway Webb Compound design. As of February 2013 Orion is on long-term loan and display at the Shildon Locomotion Museum.

On 14 January 1976, British Rail Class 87 electric locomotive 87 001 was officially named "Stephenson" by the president of the society (whose members paid for the nameplates) in a ceremony at Euston station, London. The event had originally been scheduled for 30 December 1975, marking the end of celebrations to commemorate the 150th anniversary of the Stockton and Darlington Railway that year.
