= Bournville (Mon) Halt railway station =

Former railway station in Monmouthshire, Wales

Bournville (Mon)
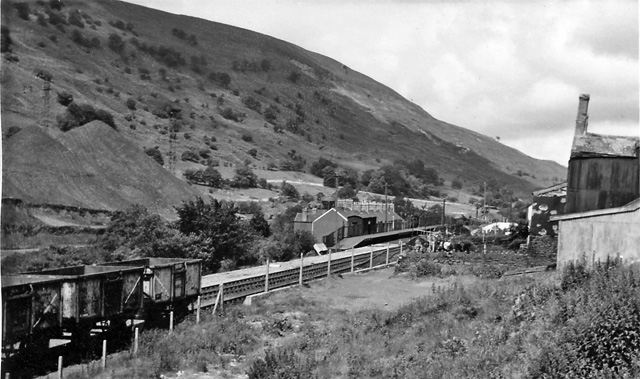
- Station remains in 1966.

General information
- Location: Ty'r-Cecil nr Blaina, Blaenau Gwent; Wales
- Coordinates: 51.7501°N 3.1566°W
- Grid reference: SO202063
- Platforms: 1

Other information
- Status: Disused

History
- Original company: Great Western Railway
- Post-grouping: Great Western Railway

Key dates
- July 1897: Opened as Tylers Arms Platform
- 30 October 1933: Renamed Bournville (Mon)
- 5 October 1942: Became a halt
- 30 April 1962: Closed
- 5 July 1976: Line closed
Location

Bournville (Mon) Halt railway station was a station which served Ty'r-Cecil near Blaina Abertillery in the Welsh county of Monmouthshire.

== History ==
The halt was opened by the Great Western Railway in July 1897 as an untimetabled station known as Tylers Arms Platform for the use of miners. The name was taken from the public house situated just to the north. It was on the Great Western's 6-mile (9.7-kilometre) branch from Aberbeeg to Nantyglo which had first opened as a tramroad in 1824 by the Monmouthshire Railway and Canal Company before being converted to a railway in 1855. It became part of the Great Western Railway in 1880 and remained there at the Grouping of 1923.

The station was situated to the east of South Griffith Colliery and just to the west of a Baptist Chapel; it is known to have been in use by miners on 3 June 1915. The colliery was served by a series of sidings which were in use between c. 1885 and c. 1937. The single-platform halt, which was 1.5 miles (2.4 km) from Abertillery, backed on to houses in Bournville Road. It was opened to the public and renamed Bournville (Mon) on 30 October 1933, with the suffix halt being added by 5 October 1942. Passenger services were withdrawn from the station on 30 April 1962. The line through the station was singled in 1964. Official closure of the section between Blaina and Rose Heyworth Colliery including Bournville came on 5 July 1976.

Preceding station	Disused railways	Following station
Blaina; Line and station closed	Great Western Railway; Monmouthshire Railway and Canal Company	Abertillery; Line and station closed

== Present ==
The A467 road follows the course of the former line through Bournville.
