= Abertillery railway station =

Disused railway station in Abertillery, Gwent

Coordinates: 51.73063°N 3.13845°W

Abertillery
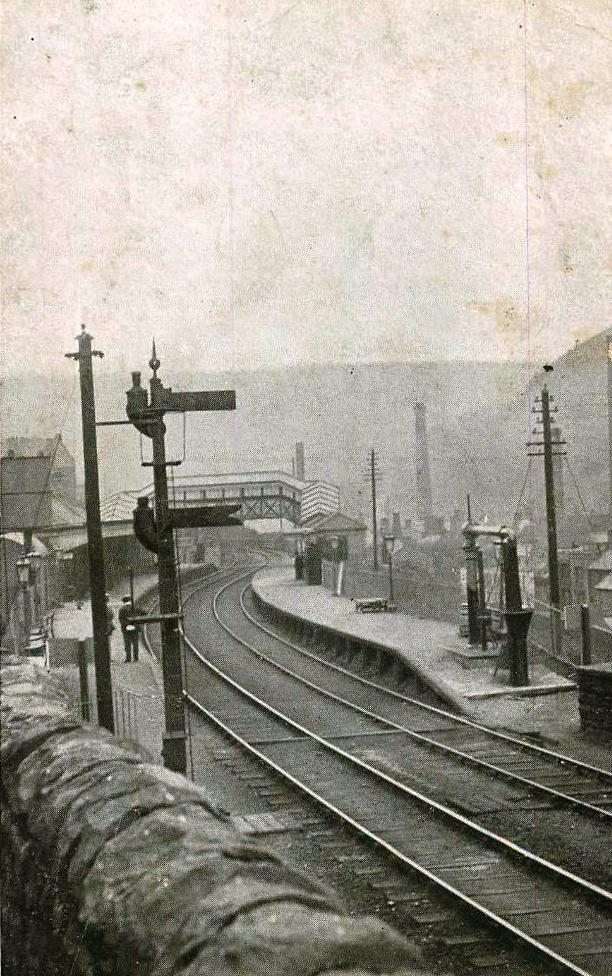

General information
- Location: Abertillery, Blaenau Gwent; Wales
- Grid reference: SO215041
- Platforms: 2

Other information
- Status: Disused

History
- Original company: Monmouthshire Railway and Canal Company
- Pre-grouping: Great Western Railway
- Post-grouping: Great Western Railway

Key dates
- 21 December 1850: Opened
- c. 1893/4: Resited 185 metres (202 yd) due north
- 30 April 1962: Closed to passengers
- 7 April 1969: Closed to goods traffic
Location

Abertillery railway station was a station which served Abertillery, in the Welsh county of Monmouthshire.

== History ==
Among the lines built by the Monmouthshire Railway and Canal Company from Newport into the valleys was a 6-mile (9.7-kilometre) branch from Aberbeeg to Nantyglo, which was first opened as a tramroad in 1824 branching from the Llanhiledd Tramroad between Crumlin and Beaufort. The first timetabled passenger service began on 21 December 1850 from Newport Courtybella to Blaina via Abertillery. The line was converted to a railway in 1855 together with other Monmouth tramroads in the area. It became part of the Great Western Railway in 1880 and remained there at the Grouping of 1923.

The first Abertillery station was replaced by a second situated 185 metres (202 yd) north in c. 1893/4. Solidly-built stone buildings were provided on the Up platform. The platforms were constructed of timber in order to reduce the weight on the made-up land on the valley side. Just to the south of the station was Abertillery Junction where a short mineral branch less than a mile long diverged to serve Cwmtillery Colliery from 1858 to 1963. The station had 59 employees in 1929 and 48 in 1938. In the 1930s, a combined rail and theatre ticket was issued which allowed passengers from certain stations in the Western valleys of Monmouthshire to travel to Abertillery which at the time had four cinemas.

Passenger services were withdrawn from the station on 30 April 1962 and cessation of goods services followed on 7 April 1969. The line through the station was singled on 3 May 1971. The route was progressively shortened as collieries were closed, with the last section being taken out of use in 1989 after the closure of Six Bells Colliery. The first station had remained open for goods traffic until 1 April 1963 during which period it was designated as "Abertillery Old Yard".

| Preceding station | Disused railways | Following station |
|---|---|---|
| Bournville (Mon) Halt; Line and station closed | Great Western Railway; Monmouthshire Railway and Canal Company | Six Bells Halt; Line and station closed |

== Present and future ==
The trackbed is clear up to south of the former station site. However the A467 road has been built on the formation from there northward.

The platform of the old station, albeit entirely cleared of station buildings, remained partly in place into the 1980s until the A467 development began, but a wire fence stood between it and the singled line. Station House, the one-time home of the stationmaster and the one remaining building associated with Abertillery Station, remains as a private dwelling on the town's Oak Street.

=== Proposed reopening ===
Abertillery was initially identified as a potential future phase development of the Ebbw Valley Railway. The preferred location of the station would be the British Gas site to the south of the former Co-op store. The extension of the railway line to Abertillery would involve relaying 2.5 kilometres (1.6 miles) of single-track from Aberbeeg Junction. In April 2009, a bus link to the nearest station at Llanhilleth was withdrawn after Blaenau Gwent County Borough Council said that it could not continue funding the £200,000 a year service following the ending of Welsh Assembly funding.

In October 2010, it was reported that Sewta had approved recommendations by Capita Symonds for new stations at Abertillery and Crumlin as part of a £14.2 million scheme which would see an hourly service between Abertillery and Cardiff. Negotiations were said to be ongoing with Tesco, the owners of the Co-op site, for the sale of the land. The site would have parking for up to 80 cars, creating a park and ride facility. The estimated cost of extending the line to Abertillery is estimated at £16.7m according to Sewta; part of the trackbed, which is owned by Blaenau Gwent Council, is used as a cycleway but there is thought to be sufficient space for a single track.

However, after the scheme was omitted from the Welsh Government's National Transport Plan for funding priorities until 2015, Welsh Transport Minister Carl Sargeant AM confirmed that the new station is not a priority until after 2015.

This line has been identified by Campaign for a Better Transport as a priority 1 candidate for reopening.

In January 2014 a petition was started by local resident Antony Partridge to reopen a station in Abertillery. The online petition gained over 1100 signatories. Despite this, as of 2026 the station is yet to be built.
