= Newport Courtybella railway station =

Former railway station in Wales

Newport Courtybella
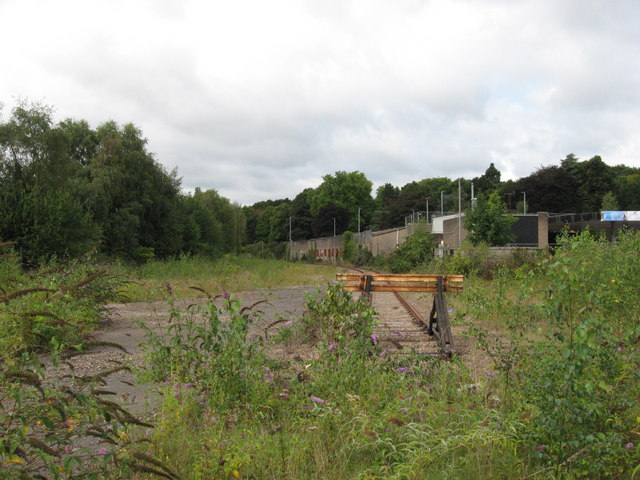
- Station site in August 2010.

General information
- Location: Newport, Newport; Wales
- Coordinates: 51.5779°N 2.9995°W
- Grid reference: ST308870
- Platforms: ?

Other information
- Status: Disused

History
- Original company: Monmouthshire Railway and Canal Company

Key dates
- 23 December 1850: Opened
- 4 August 1852: Closed
Location

Newport Courtybella railway station (also known as Court-y-Bella and Cwrt-y-Bella) was a temporary station opened by the Monmouthshire Railway and Canal Company in central Newport, Wales.

== History ==
A part of Monmouthshire at the time, the station was opened on 23 December 1850 as the temporary southern terminus of the Monmouthshire Railway and Canal Company's Western Valleys line to Blaina. The station was sited 1 mile (1.6 km) from Newport at Court-y-bella, a little to the west of the junction where the tramroad diverged to Dock St/Llanarth St and Pillgwenlly.

Courtybella station was built by the contractors Rennie and Logan who provided platforms and an engine shed. The initial service consisted of two daily passenger trains each way with a total journey time of 1¾ hours. The service was extended to Ebbw Vale on 19 April 1852. An extra train was added to the timetable, so that services ran at 7.00am, 12.00pm and 4.45pm from Newport, and at 9.00am, 2.15pm and 6.45pm in the other direction. The train divided en route at Aberbeeg, with one half continuing to Ebbw Vale via Cwm and Victoria, while the other half proceeded to Blaina via Abertillery. At the time, the line had a 4 ft 4 in (1,321 mm) gauge.

The temporary station at Courtybella was closed on 4 August 1852 when Newport Dock Street railway station was brought into use. In 1857, the wooden sheds and stone buildings at Courtybella were taken down and the material reused to provide carriage and wagon repair workshops at the Eastern and Western Valleys workshop in Bolt Street, Newport.

Preceding station	Disused railways	Following station
Bassaleg Junction; Line and station closed	Monmouthshire Railway and Canal Company	Terminus

== Present ==
All traces of the passenger station had disappeared by 1960, with the site marked only by a zero milepost from which the distances into the Western Valley were measured. The line through Courtybella was singled in 1971 the section west to Park Junction on the Western Valleys line closing in 1981 The line east to Dock Street remained open until 26 January 1991 following the cessation of coal traffic to the distribution centre at Dock Street. The track was then lifted back to Courtybella Crossing, although in recent years a short section was relaid as a run-round loop for trains from Newport Docks which need to proceed west, in particular for coal trains to Aberthaw.

== See also ==
- Railway stations in Newport
