= Ebbw Vale (Low Level) railway station =

Former railway station in Wales

Ebbw Vale (Low Level)
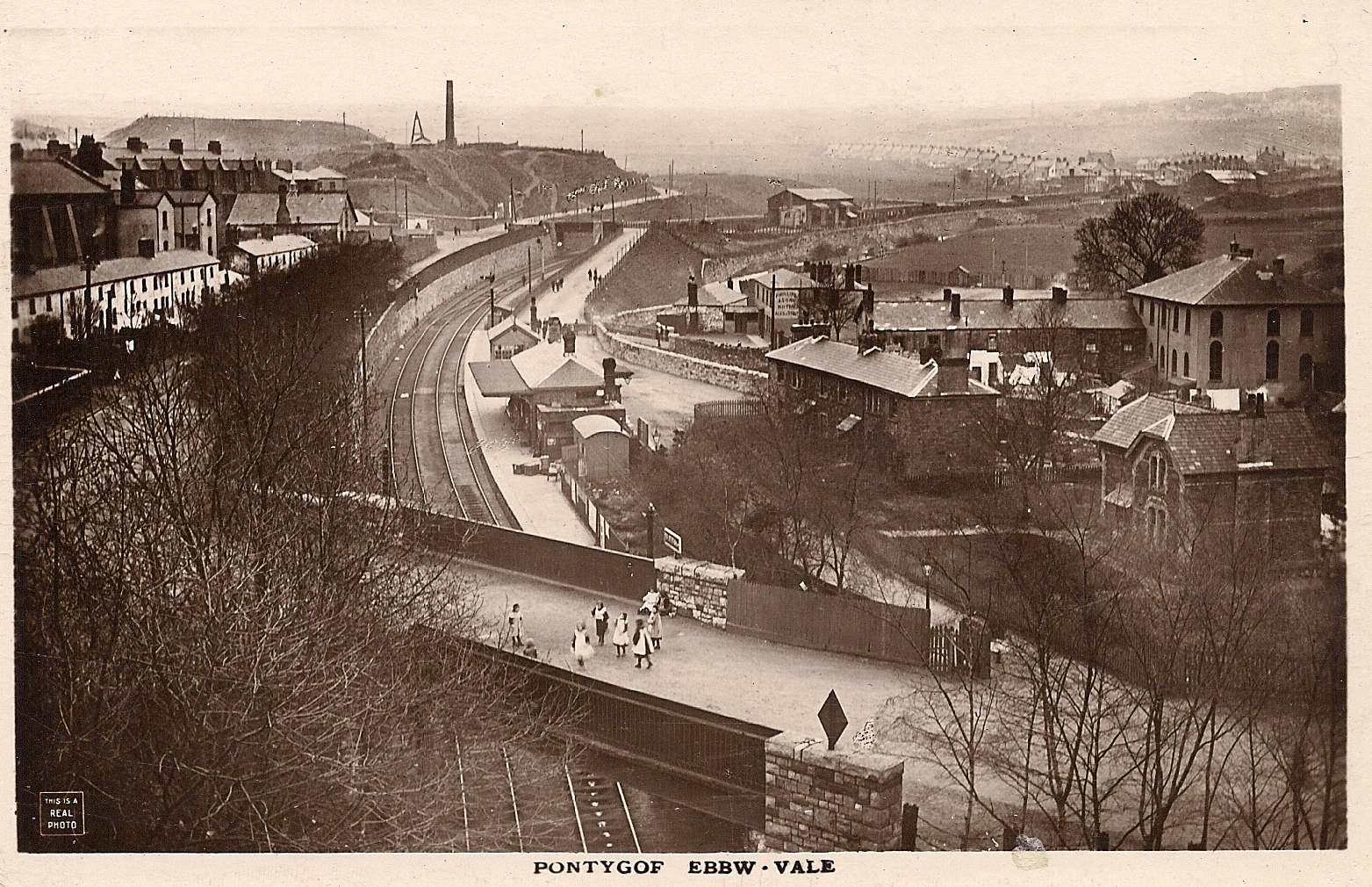

General information
- Location: Ebbw Vale, Blaenau Gwent; Wales
- Coordinates: 51.7827°N 3.2063°W
- Grid reference: SO168100
- Platforms: 1

Other information
- Status: Disused

History
- Original company: Monmouthshire Railway and Canal Company
- Pre-grouping: Great Western Railway
- Post-grouping: Great Western Railway

Key dates
- 19 April 1852: Opened as Ebbw Vale
- 19 July 1950: Renamed
- 30 April 1962: Closed to passenger traffic
- 1 December 1969: Closed to goods traffic
Location

Ebbw Vale (Low Level) railway station was a station which served Ebbw Vale, in the Welsh county of Monmouthshire.

== History ==
The origins of the railway in Ebbw Vale can be traced to the Beaufort Ironworks Tramway which opened in 1798 between the ironworks as far as Crumlin. The tramway was converted from 3 ft 4 in (1,016 mm) to 4 ft 4 in (1,321 mm) gauge in 1806. On 23 December 1850, the Monmouthshire Railway and Canal Company introduced a regular passenger service between Newport Courtybella and Blaina. Services were extended to Ebbw Vale on 19 April 1852 after improvement works had been carried out to the 9.5 miles (15.3 km) section between Aberbeeg and Ebbw Vale. The initial passenger service consisted of three trains either way at 7.00am, 12.00pm and 4.45pm from Newport, and at 9.00am, 2.15pm and 6.45pm in the other direction. The tramway was relaid as a standard gauge line in 1855.

A single platform station was provided with a brick station building facing the road. Situated in a slight cutting, it was conveniently located to the town centre. It was also convenient for the Ebbw Vale Steelworks at Pont-y-Gof which were connected to the line by the Rassa Railroad. This connection was in use until 2 November 1959. Adjacent to the station building was a 46-lever signal box. The line continued north to a remotely situated goods yard and an untimetabled stop for miners at Beaufort. To the south, a road overbridge crossed the line. The single platform was subsequently doubled in size and the platform buildings rebuilt. The station boasted a staff of 44 in 1923 and 62 in 1937.

A second station was opened in Ebbw Vale by the London and North Western Railway on 2 September 1867. To distinguish the two Ebbw Vale stations, British Railways added the suffix "High Level" (the L&NWR station) on 23 May 1949 and "Low Level" (the GWR station) on 19 July 1950.

The rundown of the line began in 1939 when the Beaufort Ironworks line fell out of use. Next came dieselisation in 1958 and then closure to passengers on 30 April 1962. The line was then singled in 1964 and the signal box was taken out of use on 17 August in the same year. Closure to goods traffic came on 1 December 1969.

Preceding station	Disused railways	Following station
Beaufort (GWR)	Great Western Railway; Monmouthshire Railway and Canal Company	Tyllwyn Halt; Line partly open, station closed

== Present ==
The station site was cleared after closure and only the station house and a short section of the retaining wall which supported the cutting side remains. A road occupies part of the trackbed. The current Ebbw Vale Town railway station is a little way to the south of the original site.
