= Ebbw Vale railway station =

Ebbw Vale railway station can refer to

- Ebbw Vale railway station, Ipswich, Australia
- Ebbw Vale (High Level) railway station, South Wales
- Ebbw Vale (Low Level) railway station, South Wales
- Ebbw Vale Parkway railway station, South Wales
- Ebbw Vale Town railway station, South Wales
