= Six Bells railway station =

Six Bells was the name of several former railway stations in Wales:

- Garndiffaith railway station - a former station in Torfaen once known as Six Bells which closed in 1941
- Six Bells Colliery railway station - a former station near Six Bells Halt railway station in Blaenau Gwent which served the local colliery
- Six Bells Halt railway station - a former station in Blaenau Gwent which closed in 1962
