= Six Bells Halt railway station =

Railway station in Blaenau Gwent, Monmouthshire, Wales from 1937 to 1962

Six Bells Halt

General information
- Location: Six Bells, Blaenau Gwent; Wales
- Coordinates: 51.7212°N 3.1288°W
- Grid reference: SO221030
- Platforms: 2

Other information
- Status: Disused

History
- Original company: Great Western Railway
- Post-grouping: Great Western Railway

Key dates
- 27 September 1937: Opened
- 30 April 1962: Closed
Location

Six Bells Halt railway station was a station which served the Six Bells Colliery near Abertillery in the Welsh county of Monmouthshire.

== History ==
The halt was opened by the Great Western Railway on 27 September 1937 on its line from 6-mile (9.7-kilometre) branch from Aberbeeg to Nantyglo. The route had first opened as a tramroad in 1824 by the Monmouthshire Railway and Canal Company before being converted to a railway in 1855. It became part of the Great Western Railway in 1880 and remained there at the Grouping of 1923.

The station was situated to the north-east of Six Bells Colliery which was served by a network of sidings which remained in use until 30 November 1980. The line was four-tracked to the south of Six Bells Halt narrowing to two lines going through the station beyond which was a loop serving two small collieries. The 35-lever Cwmnantygroes signal box, which lay to the north, was in use until 11 October 1964. The station was provided with an island platform reached via a footbridge. A private siding for J. Lancaster & Co. Ltd trailed off to the west; this was in use from 1891 to 1980. In 1947, two special trains for National Coal Board staff were running daily between Ebbw Vale and Six Bells. This attracted criticism in the House of Commons on the basis of the costs involved. Passenger services were withdrawn from the station on 30 April 1962. The line through the station was singled on 3 May 1971. The route was progressively shortened as collieries were closed, with the last section being taken out of use in 1989 after the closure of Six Bells Colliery.

To the south of Six Bells Halt, there had been a previous station which served the colliery between July 1897 and July 1902. This was an untimetabled halt for the use of miners.

Preceding station	Disused railways	Following station
Abertillery; Line and station closed	Great Western Railway; Monmouthshire Railway and Canal Company	Aberbeeg; Line and station closed

== Proposed re-opening ==
In 2010 Sewta proposed to reopen the line through Six Bells Halt as part of a scheme which would see a new station at Abertillery with an hourly service to Cardiff. The cost of extending the line to Abertillery was estimated at £16.7m according to Sewta. Part of the trackbed, which is owned by Blaenau Gwent Council, is used as a cycleway and there was thought to be sufficient space for a single track. However, after the scheme was omitted from the Welsh Government's National Transport Plan for funding priorities until 2015, Welsh Transport Minister Carl Sargeant AM confirmed that the new station would not be a priority until after 2015.
