= Cwm railway station =

Former railway station in Wales

Cwm
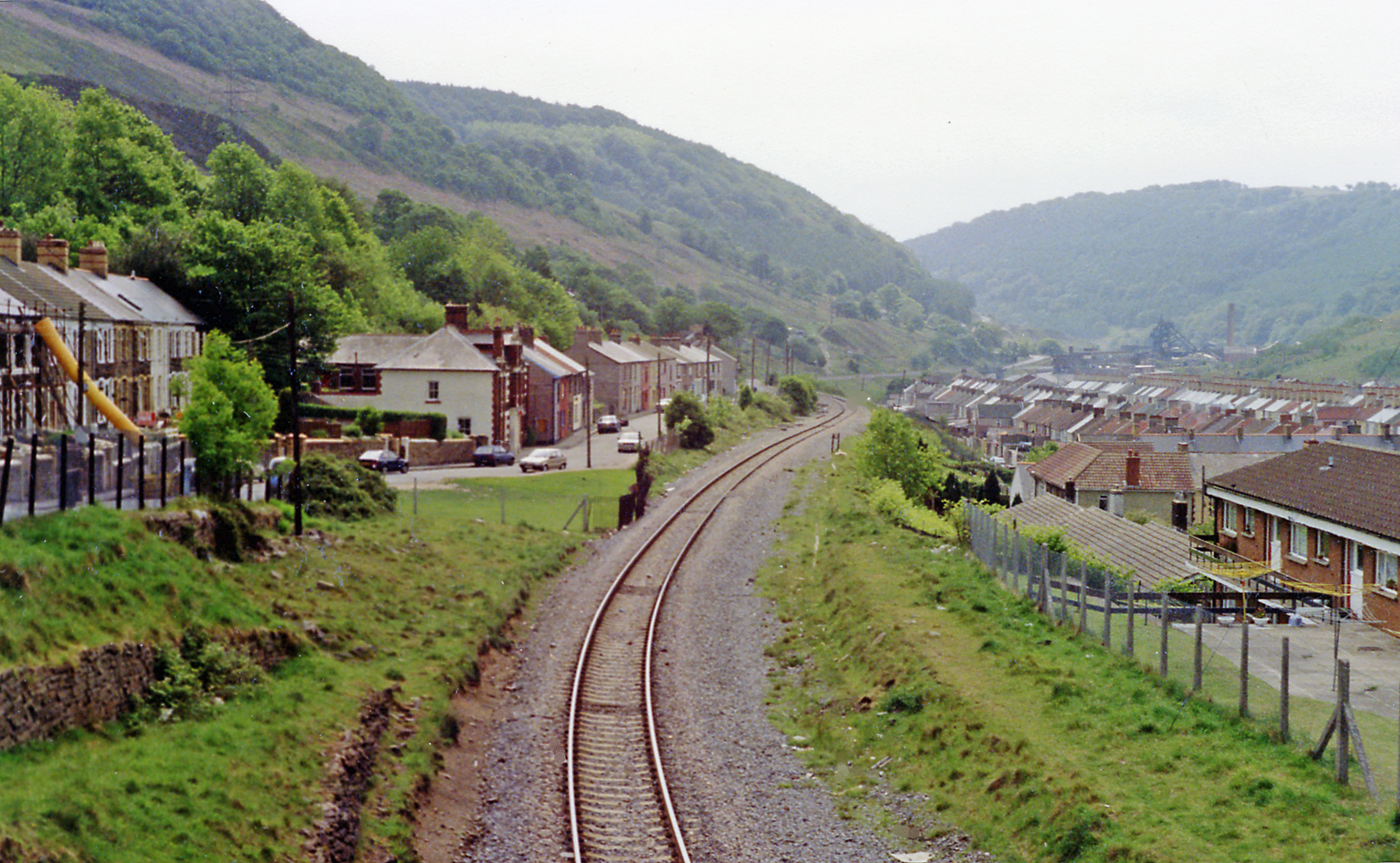
- Station site in 1990.

General information
- Location: Cwm, Blaenau Gwent; Wales
- Coordinates: 51.7417°N 3.1822°W
- Grid reference: SO184055
- Platforms: 2

Other information
- Status: Disused

History
- Original company: Monmouthshire Railway and Canal Company
- Pre-grouping: Great Western Railway
- Post-grouping: Great Western Railway

Key dates
- 19 April 1852: Opened
- 30 April 1962: Closed to passengers
- 4 November 1963: Closed to goods traffic
Location

Cwm railway station served the village of Cwm in Monmouthshire, Wales.

== History ==
The station was originally opened by the Monmouthshire Railway and Canal Company on 19 April 1852. It became part of the Great Western Railway in 1880 and remained there at the Grouping of 1923. The line then passed on to the Western Region of British Railways on nationalisation in 1948. The station was closed to passengers by the British Transport Commission on 30 April 1962, remaining open for goods traffic until 4 November 1963.

== Present day ==
A new station on the Ebbw Valley Railway, which would serve the community of Cwm, South Wales has been proposed. Planning permission has not yet been granted, and the station was not included in the first stage of the line reopening plan, which created a passenger service between Cardiff Central and Ebbw Vale Parkway in 2008.

Preceding station	Historical railways	Following station
Victoria (Blaenau Gwent); Line and station open	Great Western Railway; Monmouthshire Railway and Canal Company	Aberbeeg; Line open, station closed
	Future services	
Ebbw Vale Parkway	Transport for Wales; Ebbw Valley Railway	Llanhilleth

== See also ==
- South Wales Metro
- Transport for Wales
- Proposed railway stations in Wales
