= Nantyglo railway station =

Former railway station in Monmouthshire, Wales

Nantyglo

General information
- Location: Nantyglo, Blaenau Gwent; Wales
- Coordinates: 51.7816°N 3.1725°W
- Grid reference: SO192098
- Platforms: 1

Other information
- Status: Disused

History
- Original company: Monmouthshire Railway and Canal Company
- Pre-grouping: Great Western Railway
- Post-grouping: Great Western Railway

Key dates
- 16 May 1859: Opened
- 28 May 1906: Became a through station
- 30 April 1962: Closed
- 4 November 1963: Line closed
Location

Nantyglo railway station was a station which served Nantyglo, in the Welsh county of Monmouthshire.

== History ==
Among the lines built by the Monmouthshire Railway and Canal Company from Newport into the valleys was a 6-mile (9.7-kilometre) branch from Aberbeeg to Nantyglo, which was first opened as a tramroad in 1824 branching from the Llanhiledd Tramroad between Crumlin and Beaufort. The first timetabled passenger service ran on 23 December 1850 from Newport Courtybella to Blaina. The line was converted to a railway in 1855 together with other Monmouth tramroads in the area. It became part of the Great Western Railway in 1880 and remained there at the Grouping of 1923.

Although the Monmouthshire Railway had established a goods station at Brynmawr by 15 December 1849 via its connection with Joseph and Crawshay Bailey's tramroad at Coalbrook Vale, passenger services were not extended beyond Nantyglo Gate at Blaina. It was only after agreement was reached in June 1858 with the two brothers that the Monmouthshire Railway was authorised to establish a station in their territory. Nantyglo station opened on 16 May 1859 and was the terminus of the line from Aberbeeg until 1906 when the Brynmawr and Western Valleys Railway opened to provide a link with Brynmawr on the London and North Western Railway's Heads of the Valleys line. The link was 1 mile 10.75 chains (1.826 km) from a point 410 yards (370 m) north of Nantyglo's booking office to a junction with the LNWR line, 150 yards (140 m) to the west of Brynmawr station. Although the official opening took place on 30 June 1905, it was not until 28 May 1906 that it was authorised to open. The new line, which was on a 1 in 47 gradient fall towards Nantyglo, was jointly worked by the Great Western and the LNWR, with traffic exchanged between the two companies at Nantyglo. The link created the third route from Newport to Brynmawr, it also being possible to travel via Blaenavon High Level or Nantybwch and the Sirhowy Railway.

A single platform was provided for the station which had a small goods yard on the opposite side of the line. Such was the traffic generated during the 1930s that the station had a staff of eleven. To the north of the station was a tall signal box with 20 levers and to the south there was a passing loop. Passenger and goods services were withdrawn from the station on 30 April 1962. The line was progressively shortened as colleries were closed, with official closure of the section between Brynmawr and Coalbrookvale including Nantyglo coming on 4 November 1963. The last section of the route near Abertillery was taken out of use in 1989 after the closure of Six Bells Colliery.

Preceding station	Disused railways	Following station
Terminus	Great Western Railway; Monmouthshire Railway and Canal Company	Blaina; Line and station closed
Brynmawr; Line and station closed	Great Western Railway and London and North Western Railway; Brynmawr and Western Valleys Railway	Terminus

== Present ==
The A467 road follows the course of the former line through Nantyglo.
