= Blaina railway station =

Former railway station in Monmouthshire, Wales

Blaina
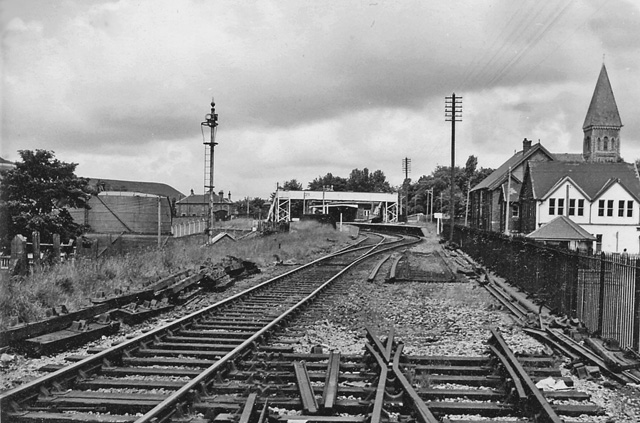
- Station remains in 1966.

General information
- Location: Blaina, Blaenau Gwent; Wales
- Coordinates: 51.7644°N 3.1613°W
- Grid reference: SO199079
- Platforms: 2

Other information
- Status: Disused

History
- Original company: Monmouthshire Railway and Canal Company
- Pre-grouping: Great Western Railway
- Post-grouping: Great Western Railway

Key dates
- 23 December 1850: Opened
- 30 April 1962: Closed to passengers
- 23 March 1964: Closed to goods
- 5 July 1976: Line closed
Location

Blaina railway station was a station which served the town of Blaina in the Welsh county of Monmouthshire.

== History ==
Among the lines built by the Monmouthshire Railway and Canal Company from Newport into the valleys was a 6-mile (9.7-kilometre) branch from Aberbeeg to Nantyglo, which was first opened as a tramroad in 1824 branching from the Llanhiledd Tramroad between Crumlin and Beaufort. The first timetabled passenger service began on 23 December 1850 from Newport Courtybella to Blaina via Abertillery. There were two daily services each way; the journey time was 1¾ hours between termini. The line was converted to a railway in 1855 together with other Monmouth tramroads in the area. It became part of the Great Western Railway in 1880 and remained there at the Grouping of 1923.

Blaina station opened with the first timetabled service on 23 December 1850. It was situated opposite St Peter's Church and to the north of Blaina Reading Institute. To the north lay a network of sidings branching off to serve the Tinplate Works and Lower Deep Pit, while to the south were the Gasworks served by a private siding between 1911 and 1937. The Brynmawr and Blaina Gas Company received around 4000 tons of coal yearly during this period, after which coke oven gas was sourced from Blaenavon. The station had two platforms linked by a covered footbridge which subsequently lost its roof. A pagoda shelter stood on the Down platform, whilst the solidly-built stone station building was on the Up platform with a 42-lever signal box which was in service until 11 October 1964. Around 15 staff were employed at Blaina station in the 1930s.

Passenger services were withdrawn from the station on 30 April 1962. Goods facilities were provided until 23 March 1964. The route was progressively shortened as collieries were closed, with official closure of the section between Blaina and Rose Heyworth Colliery coming on 5 July 1976. The last section of the line near Abertillery was taken out of use in 1989 after the closure of Six Bells Colliery.

Preceding station	Disused railways	Following station
Nantyglo; Line and station closed	Great Western Railway; Monmouthshire Railway and Canal Company	Bournville (Mon) Halt; Line and station closed

== Present ==
The A467 road follows the course of the former line through Blaina.
