= St Illtyd =

Coordinates: 51.71081°N 3.13290°W

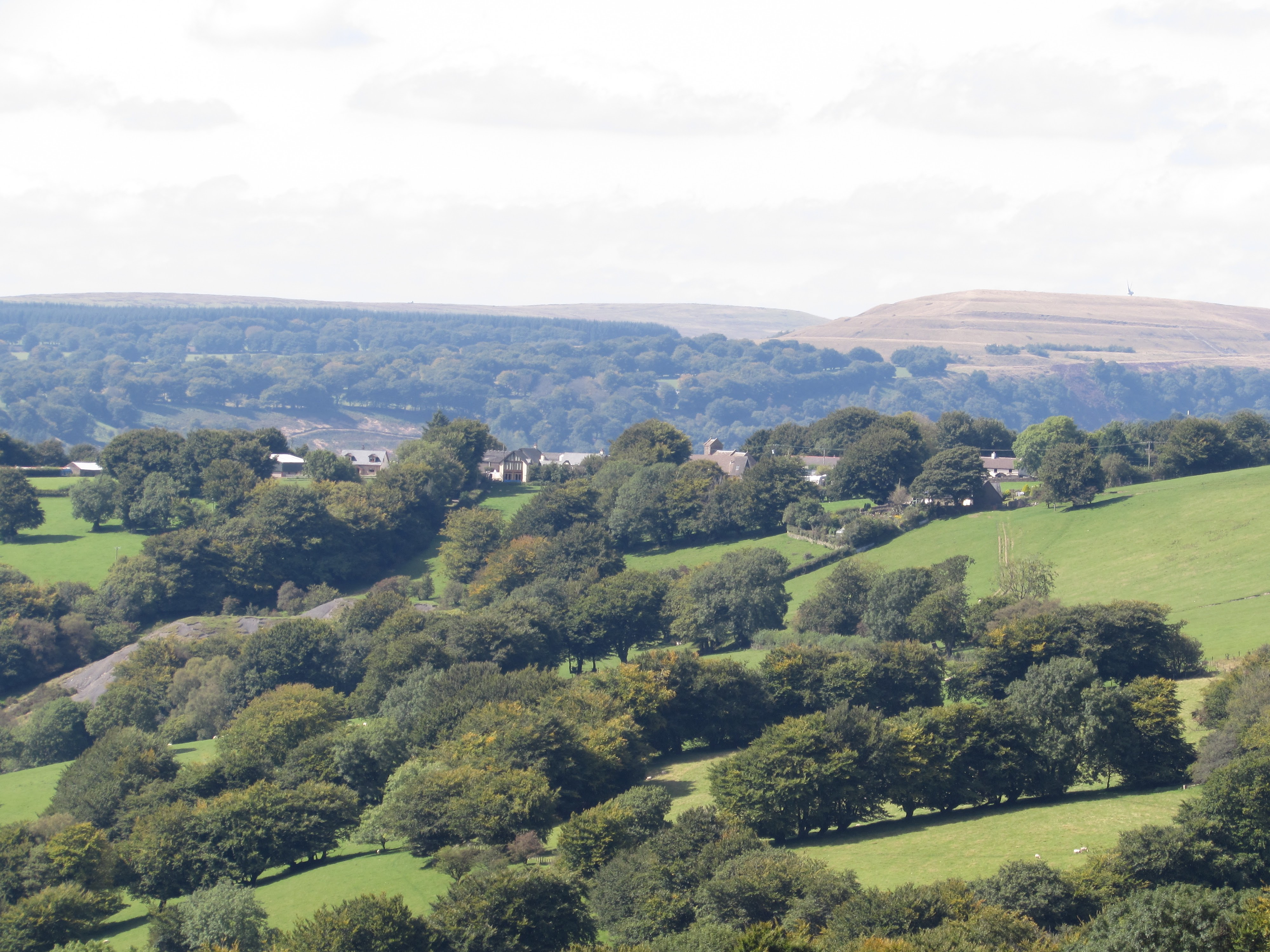
- St Illtyd as viewed from the South East

- Location within Blaenau Gwent
- Population: 4,797 (Llanhilleth) (2011)
- OS grid reference: SO218020
- Community: Cwm & Waunlwyd
- Principal area: Blaenau Gwent
- Preserved county: Blaenau Gwent
- Country: Wales
- Sovereign state: United Kingdom
- Post town: ABERTILLERY
- Postcode district: NP13
- Dialling code: 01495
- Police: Gwent
- Fire: South Wales
- Ambulance: Welsh
- UK Parliament: Blaenau Gwent and Rhymney
- Senedd Cymru – Welsh Parliament: Blaenau Gwent

St Illtyd is a hamlet near Aberbeeg, in southeast Wales, within the historic boundaries of Monmouthshire. It is situated on the mountain road between Pontypool and Abertillery in Blaenau Gwent. It rests at about 1200 feet above sea level. The Royal Mail postcode is NP13 2AY.

It is located 1.26 miles (2.03 km) south of Abertillery and 10.56 miles (16.99 km) north of Newport. The B4471 runs near to the village. The population of the wider community including nearby Aberbeeg and Llanhilleth is 4,797.

== Geography ==
St Illtyd's church by night

In and around the hamlet there can be found cottages, farms, former farms, a public house, a former public house, a huge former open cast site, former levels, a canyon left by an opencast or strip mining and a television transmitter.

A nearby proposal for a sandstone mine has been reported by newspapers locally after a number of unsuccessful planning applications since 2006. The landowner made further attempts in 2011.

== History ==
It is most notable for St Illtyd's Church, a 13th-century building generally believed to have been built by Cistercian monks from Llantarnam on the site of a previous church which historians have tended to date as dating from 863 AD or thereabouts. The present dedication to St Illtyd is not however the original one, for it was not until around 1754 that this saint's name was given as the name of the church. The 9th century "Englynion y Beddau" (Stanzas of the Graves) collected among the texts now known as the Black Book of Carmarthen (recorded 12th-13th centuries) refer to "Llan Heledd" or "Llan Helet", (Heledd being a sixth to seventh princess of Powys and a "local canonisation".

T. D. Breverton records that during the 16th and 17th centuries the parish of Llanhilleth bore the name Llanheledd Forwyn (Church of Heledd the Virgin), and this dedication has survived today in the place-name, having reached its present form via Llan Helet, Llanheledd, Llanhiledd and Llanhylithe down the years, although Llaniddel is given by Archdeacon Coxe in 1701 as the name of the parish and there are references to the church as being dedicated to "St Ithel" until around 1800.

Until 1911 it was the parish church of Llanhilleth, now in the Diocese of Monmouth, and it remained in intermittent use as a place of worship until 1975. The following list of incumbents is given in various places.

- 1560 - The Reverend John Williams
- 1612 - The Reverend David Pritchard
- 1617 - The Reverend William Price
- 1660 - The Reverend Lewis James
- c.1700 - The Reverend Walter Evans
- 1742 - The Reverend Richard Edwards
- 1768 - The Reverend Abednego Pritchard
- 1771 - The Reverend David Jones
- 1818 - The Reverend Thomas Jones
- 1840 - The Reverend William Evans
- 1843 - The Reverend James Hughes
- 1895 - The Reverend Daniel Felix
- 1930 - The Reverend Canon Thomas Madog Williams - obit 1956
- 1957 - The Reverend John MacLaren Price (largely nominal after 1962)
- 1968 - The Reverend Lewis David Pritchard (officiated only intermittently at St Illtyd)
- 1982 - The Reverend Albert James Way (nominal only, 1982–84)

The church was abandoned after 1975, although the circular churchyard, which is now closed for burials remains in the care of the Church in Wales. The building was de-consecrated in 1985 in an advanced state of decay, but was renovated as an historic monument in 1990. Today the Friends of St Illtyd help Blaenau Gwent County Borough Council look after the church building.

John Wesley visited St Illtyd twice to speak at the preaching cross which is now in the graveyard.

== Transport ==
The hamlet is a 47-minute walk or 1.8 miles (2.9 km) from Llanhilleth railway station where trains run hourly between Ebbw Vale and Cardiff Central. In 2021 services will operate to Newport.

It is a 28-minute 1 mile (1.6 km) walk from the centre of Brynithel village, where residents are served by the number 1 bus between Six Bells and Abertillery, and the slightly further away Rugby Club stop provides connections to Stagecoach South Wales services:

- 62 (Ebbw Vale-Cwmbran)
- X15 (Newport-Brynmawr)
- X1 (Cwmbran-Brynmawr and Pontypool)
- 95B (Newbridge)

== Governance ==
The Llanhilleth electoral ward serves the village. The ward is represented by Councillors Norman Lee Parsons (Llanhilleth, Ind), Hedley McCarthy (Llanhilleth, Lab), and Joanne Collins (Llanhilleth, Ind).

The area is represented in the Senedd by Alun Davies (Labour) and the Member of Parliament is Nick Smith (Labour).
