= Aberbeeg =

Village in Wales

Coordinates: 51.709°N 3.145°W

Aberbeeg: Welsh: Aber-bîg
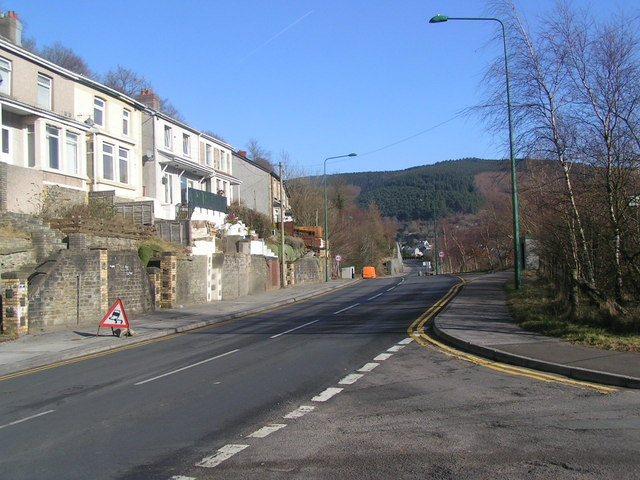

- Location within Blaenau Gwent
- OS grid reference: SO213017
- Principal area: Blaenau Gwent; Caerphilly County Borough Council
- Preserved county: Gwent
- Country: Wales
- Sovereign state: United Kingdom
- Post town: ABERTILLERY
- Postcode district: NP13
- Dialling code: 01495
- Police: Gwent
- Fire: South Wales
- Ambulance: Welsh
- UK Parliament: Blaenau Gwent and Rhymney

Aberbeeg (Welsh: Aber-bîg) is a village which lies in both Blaenau Gwent and Caerphilly County Borough, in Wales, within the historic boundaries of Monmouthshire. It is part of the community of Llanhilleth. The two main tributaries of the Ebbw River, the Ebbw Fawr and Ebbw Fach converge at Aberbeeg.

Nearby are the villages of Llanhilleth and Six Bells, where the former colliery allowed the whole community to thrive as part of the South Wales coalfield community.

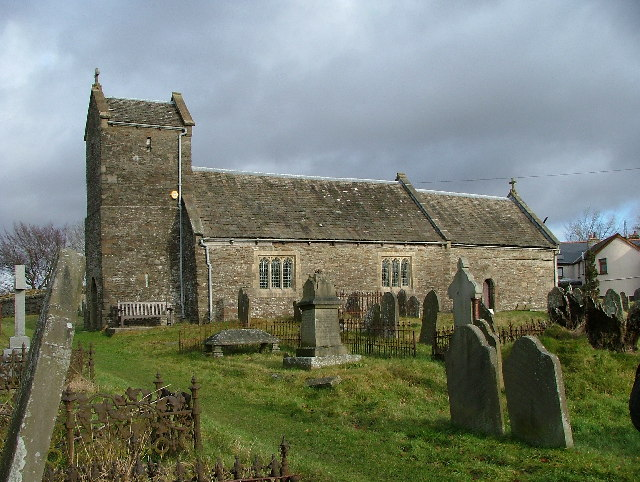
St Illtyd's church

Today, one of the most prominent sights in Aberbeeg area is the grade II* listed St. Illtyd's parish church, which is thought to have been built in the late 5th century, and underwent extensive renovation over the last 200 years. After closing in 1962, the church was privately acquired in 1984. It has now returned to public ownership and is now open to visitors. The friends of St. Illtyd help Blaenau Gwent look after the building.

Aberbeeg railway station closed on 30 April 1962. The Ebbw Valley Railway re-opened in February 2008. A bus service between Aberbeeg and Llanhilleth, the nearest railway station on the line, runs every hour.

It is named after the Nant Big (also spelled Nant Bîg), a small stream that flows into the Ebbw Fawr river approximately half-a-mile upstream from the confluence of the Ebbw Fawr and Ebbw Fach. The term "bîg" (later "beeg") in the Welsh name, is derived from the Welsh term "pig", meaning a beak or spout, which may refer to a spot where the small stream emerges.

== In popular culture ==
In the TV series Fresh Meat one of the lead characters, Josie (Kimberley Nixon), states she is from Aberbeeg.

== Bibliography ==
- Davies, John; Jenkins, Nigel; Menna, Baines; Lynch, Peredur I., eds. (2008). The Welsh Academy Encyclopaedia of Wales. Cardiff: University of Wales Press. ISBN 978-0-7083-1953-6.
