= Aberbeeg railway station =

Disused railway station in Aberbeeg, Wales

Coordinates: 51.70942°N 3.14452°W

Aberbeeg
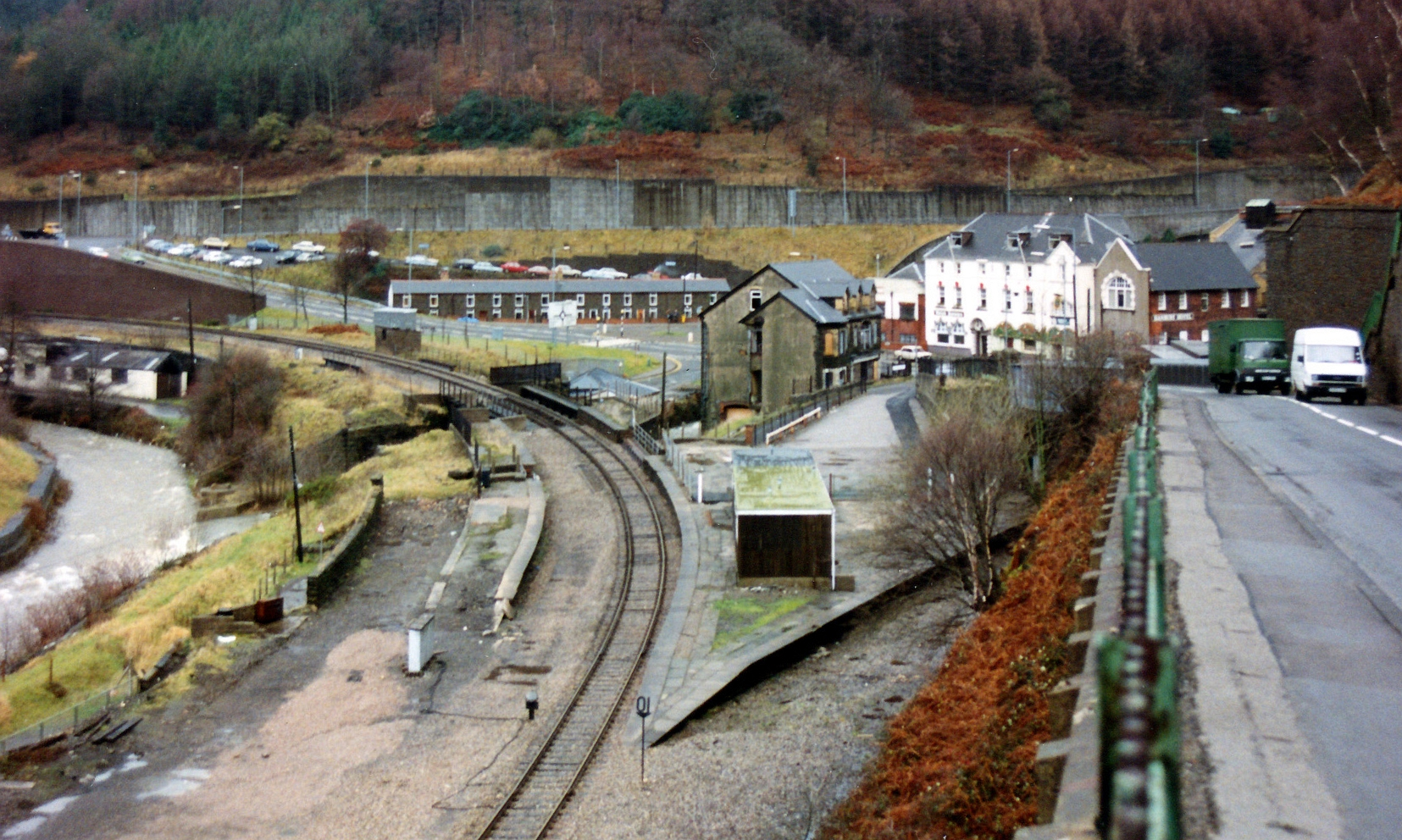

General information
- Location: Aberbeeg, Blaenau Gwent; Wales
- Grid reference: SO209018
- Platforms: 4

Other information
- Status: Disused

History
- Opened: 21 December 1850
- Original company: Monmouthshire Railway and Canal Company
- Pre-grouping: Great Western Railway
- Post-grouping: Great Western Railway

Key dates
- 30 April 1962: Closed to passengers
- 28 November 1966: Closed to goods traffic
Location

Aberbeeg railway station served the village of Aberbeeg in Monmouthshire, Wales. It was the junction where the Monmouthshire Railway and Canal Company's lines from Newport to Brynmawr and Ebbw Vale diverged.

== History ==
Opened by the Monmouthshire Railway and Canal Company on 21/23 December 1850, it became part of the Great Western Railway in 1880 and remained there at the Grouping of 1923. The line then passed on to the Western Region of British Railways on nationalisation in 1948. The station was closed to passengers by the British Transport Commission on 30 April 1962, remaining open for goods traffic until 28 November 1966.

Preceding station	Historical railways	Following station
Cwm; Line open, station closed	Great Western Railway; Monmouthshire Railway and Canal Company	Llanhilleth; Line and station open
Six Bells Halt; Line and station closed	Great Western Railway; Monmouthshire Railway and Canal Company	Llanhilleth; Line and station open

== The site today ==
Trains on the reopened Ebbw Vale Line pass the site between Llanhilleth and Ebbw Vale Parkway stations, although the station has not been re-opened (the platforms are still intact but disused).

The mooted extension of the railway line to Abertillery would involve relaying the line from Aberbeeg that was lifted in the early 1990s.
