= Monmouthshire Railway and Canal Company =

Transport operator

The Monmouthshire Railway and Canal Company was a canal and railway company that operated a canal and a network of railways in the Western Valley and Eastern Valley of Newport, Monmouthshire. It started as the Monmouthshire Canal Navigation and opened canals from Newport to Pontypool and to Crumlin from 1796. Numerous tramroads connected nearby pits and ironworks with the canal.

After 1802 the company built a tramway from Nine Mile Point, west of Risca, to Newport, and an associated company, the Sirhowy Tramroad, connected from Tredegar. Steam locomotives were used from 1829. By 1850 pressure was mounting to modernise the line, and the Newport and Pontypool Railway Amendment Act 1848 authorised conversion to a modern railway, construction of a new railway from Newport to Pontypool, and a change of name for the company to the Monmouthshire Railway and Canal Company.

The high volume of mineral activity in the area kept the company in good financial health for many years, but it failed to keep abreast of competing developments, and faced with unforeseen major loss of business it sold the rights to operate its network to the Great Western Railway (GWR) in 1875. The GWR developed the network, until in the period after 1918 road competition increasingly abstracted passenger and non-mineral goods traffic. Passenger operation ceased in 1962.

The Eastern Valley Line closed completely south of Cwmbran Junction in 1963, but the Western Valley Line was sustained by the continued operation of British Steel's works at Ebbw Vale. A passenger service from Ebbw Vale to Cardiff was resumed on 6 February 2008.

== Monmouthshire Canal Navigation ==
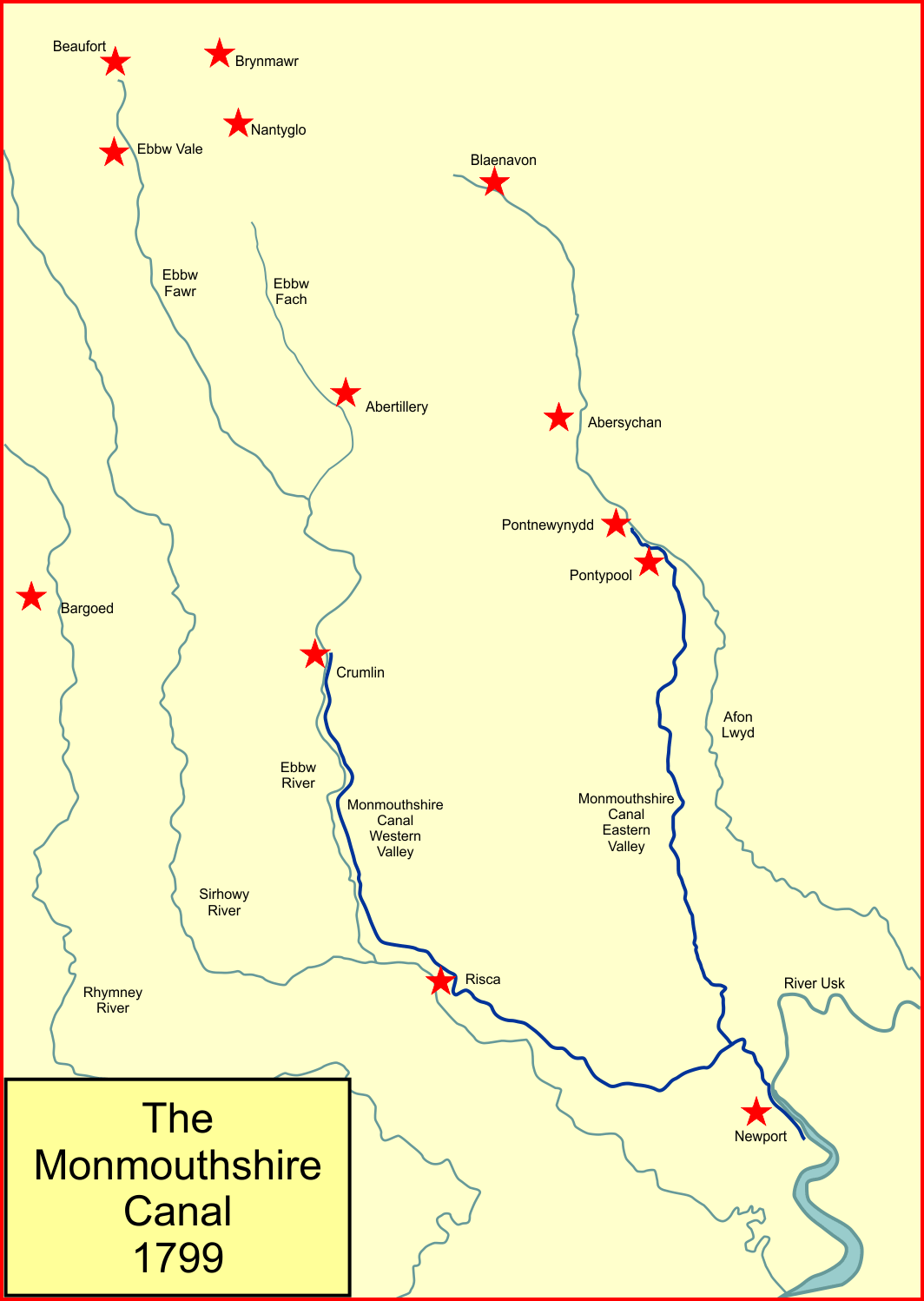
The Monmouthshire Canal system

For centuries the mineral wealth of Monmouthshire had been exploited, especially in the manufacture of iron; the necessary raw materials were all at hand: coal, ironstone, limestone, and timber. This availability encouraged technical innovation, and this in turn led to considerable progress in the industry. The iron production took place some distance from the coast, and transport away to a point of use was exceedingly difficult and expensive.

Industrialists in the area combined to finance the construction of a canal from Pontnewynydd, a little north-west of Pontypool, to Newport, and a second arm from near Crumlin, through Rogerstone to join the first arm of the canal at Crindau, close to Newport. Each arm of the canal was 11 miles in length. The canal was authorised by the Monmouthshire Canal Navigation Act 1792 (32 Geo. 3. c. 102), and the act included permission to build connecting tramways or plateways (or alternatively "stone roads") to pits within eight miles of the canal, (Note: Priestley, directly quoting the act of Parliament, says eight miles.) and to raise £120,000. The estimated cost was £106,000, and such was the enthusiasm for the scheme that the capital was all subscribed before the act was passed.

There was a considerable fall from the top of the canal to Newport: the Pontnewynydd arm descended 447 feet, using 42 locks; there were two tunnels. The Crumlin arm descended 358 feet to Crindau, and required 31 locks. Reservoirs had to be created at the heads of the canal to ensure a reliable water supply.

The main arm of the canal opened in 1796, and by this time tramroads had already been constructed in readiness connecting the furnaces of Trosnant, Blaendare and Blaenavon to the line of the canal. When the Crumlin arm was ready, corresponding tramroad connections led to it from Beaufort, Sorwy, Nantyglo and Aberbeeg. In fact, the numerous short tramroad connections exceeded in aggregate length the extent of the canal to which they led.

Priestley described the route of the canal:

This canal and its branches and railroads commence in the Usk River, not a great distance below the town of Newport, close to the termination of the Rumney and Sirhowey Railroads: passing on in a direction nearly full north and leaving Newport to the east, the canal extends by Pontypool to Pontnewynydd, a distance of more than seventeen miles and three-quarters. Near this place it connects with the Abergavenny and Brecknock Canal. In its course it passes Malpas opposite which at Crindau is a branch canal to Crumlin Bridge. At Court-y-Bella Farm at Risca and at Pillgwenlly it joins the Sirhowey Tramroad. From the Crumlin Bridge branch, there is a railroad to Beaufort ironworks; a branch to Sorwy furnace, another to Nant-y-Glo works and a third to the Sirhowey Railroad to Risca. Near Pontypool is a railway branch to Trosnant furnace and another to Blaen-Din works. From the Usk to Pontnewynydd in a distance of twelve miles and a half, there is a rise of 447 feet by the canal; in its railway continuation to Blaen-Din there is a rise of 610 feet in a distance of five miles and a quarter. From Crindau Farm to Crumlin Bridge the canal rises 358 feet in eleven miles; the railway from Crumlin Bridge to Beaufort rises 619 feet in ten miles; the Nant-y-Glo branch has a rise of 518 feet.

The gauge of the tramroads was 3 ft 4in, and it was constructed of edge rails of a plain cross-section 2 inches wide at the head and 2 1/2 inches wide at the base, and three inches deep. The wagon wheels were double flanged, straddling the rail. Cast iron sleepers maintained the gauge, and these were supported on square wooden blocks laid on stone chippings. There were no passing places on the single line tramroads: empty wagons were manhandled off the track to allow loaded wagons to pass them.

A supplementary act of Parliament was secured on 30 May 1798 to allow for loading facilities at the ship berths in Newport. In April 1799 the whole project was said to be complete, and nearly 44,000 tons of material were conveyed in 1798 alone.

== A main line plateway ==
The project was hugely successful, and there was immediate demand for connecting other mineral sites, in particular at Tredegar and in the Sirhowy Valley. Extension of the canal was a possibility, although difficulties had already been experienced with shortage of water, and with ice blockage of the canal in winter. The engineer Benjamin Outram was called in to advise. He proposed a new line of plateway from Tredegar to Risca Church, joining the existing canal there. This time the line would have "all convenient turnouts" (passing loops) and "if required to construct double rail".

In addition Outram recommended further reservoir capacity for the canal, and conversion of all the existing tramroad connections to plateways, in which the rails are L-shaped plates, the vertical flange providing the guidance to unflanged wheels; the gauge was to be 4 ft 2in. The canal company accepted his recommendations, and this was formalised on 18 December 1800.

The work was authorised by act of Parliament, the Monmouthshire Canal Navigation Act 1802 (42 Geo. 3. c. cxv), of 26 June 1802, although by that time a modification had been decided upon. Instead of the Monmouthshire Canal Navigation Company building the whole of the new plateway, it would concentrate on conversion of the existing lines, and improving the canal. The Sirhowy Tramroad Company would be formed to build the majority of the new line from Tredegar as far as a location nine miles from Newport, later named Nine Mile Point. The canal company was to build its own tramway from there to a terminus at Llanarth Street in Newport, at the canal basin. The line passed through the estate of Sir Charles Morgan, later Lord Tredegar, and he reserved tolls for himself on the mile of route through his land; this lucrative arrangement became known as "the Park Mile" or "the Golden Mile". The Monmouthshire Canal Navigation Company was by now authorised to raise a total capital of £275,330.

The whole of the Monmouthshire Canal section was double track, and there was a large viaduct of 32 arches at Risca; the whole Monmouthshire Canal Navigation Company line cost £32,000. The wagons were conveyed in trains of 15 or so drawn by five or six horses.

The Monmouthshire Canal Navigation Act 1802 allowed the Monmouthshire Canal Navigation Company to make additional wharves on the banks of the River Usk to enable cargoes to be transferred to ships for export. The canal was to be extended a mile and a quarter down the river from Llanarth Street, the original termination, to Pillgwenlly; the cost was said to be £100,000. Work was begun in 1806.

== Passengers on the tramway ==
Passengers were carried on the Monmouthshire plateway lines from 1822. They were carried on specially constructed vehicles operated by independent carriers. John Kingson operated his horse-drawn omnibus from the Tredegar Arms at Newport to Tredegar; his carriage was nicknamed the "Caravan" and ran twice weekly, Kingson paying tolls along the route. A man called Samuel Homfray soon joined Kingson with services from other towns to Newport.

== Locomotives ==
The transit from the ironworks to Newport was slow and expensive, as each wagon was accompanied by a horse and driver. The employment of steam locomotives elsewhere had been beneficial, and Samuel Homfray and his engineer Thomas Ellis were interested in using one at the Tredegar works. A locomotive was ordered from Robert Stephenson of Killingworth for trials. The locomotive, named Britannia, started work in October 1829, and the following December made its first journey to Newport. A newspaper reported:

It was confidently stated for some weeks past that the Tredegar Iron Company... were to start a locomotive engine the day of the Cattle Show, on Thursday last, to bring the iron from the Works to this port [Newport], a distance of twenty-four miles. The persons assembled at the Cattle Show (which was close to the tram-road) were looking anxiously for the steam-engine, but it did not make its appearance. The engine did, however, start from the Works early in the morning, but unfortunately, at one of the crossings in the tramroad... the wheels got out of the tram-plates, which caused a detention of some hours, and on coming through Tredegar Park, the chimney was carried away by a branch of a tree hanging over the tram-road; and in consequence of these accidents it did not arrive at Newport till the evening.

There were problems with steaming and with boiler feed water in the early days. Nevertheless, the results of locomotive operation were encouraging. However, the weight of the locomotive caused many of the tramplates to break, and the company set about adapting their track by installing more substantial plates; nearly 1,000 tons of tramplates were ordered from the Coalbrook Vale and Nant-y-glo Ironworks.

Mr Prothero of Newport ordered a locomotive from Price and Co. of Neath Abbey, to convey coal from his collieries at Blancyffin Isha to Pillgwenlly. The engine was delivered on 16 July 1830 and on 25 July made a demonstration run conveying a payload of 52 1/2 tons a distance of 15 miles. Two other coalowners followed his example.

== Upgrading the Western Valley Line ==
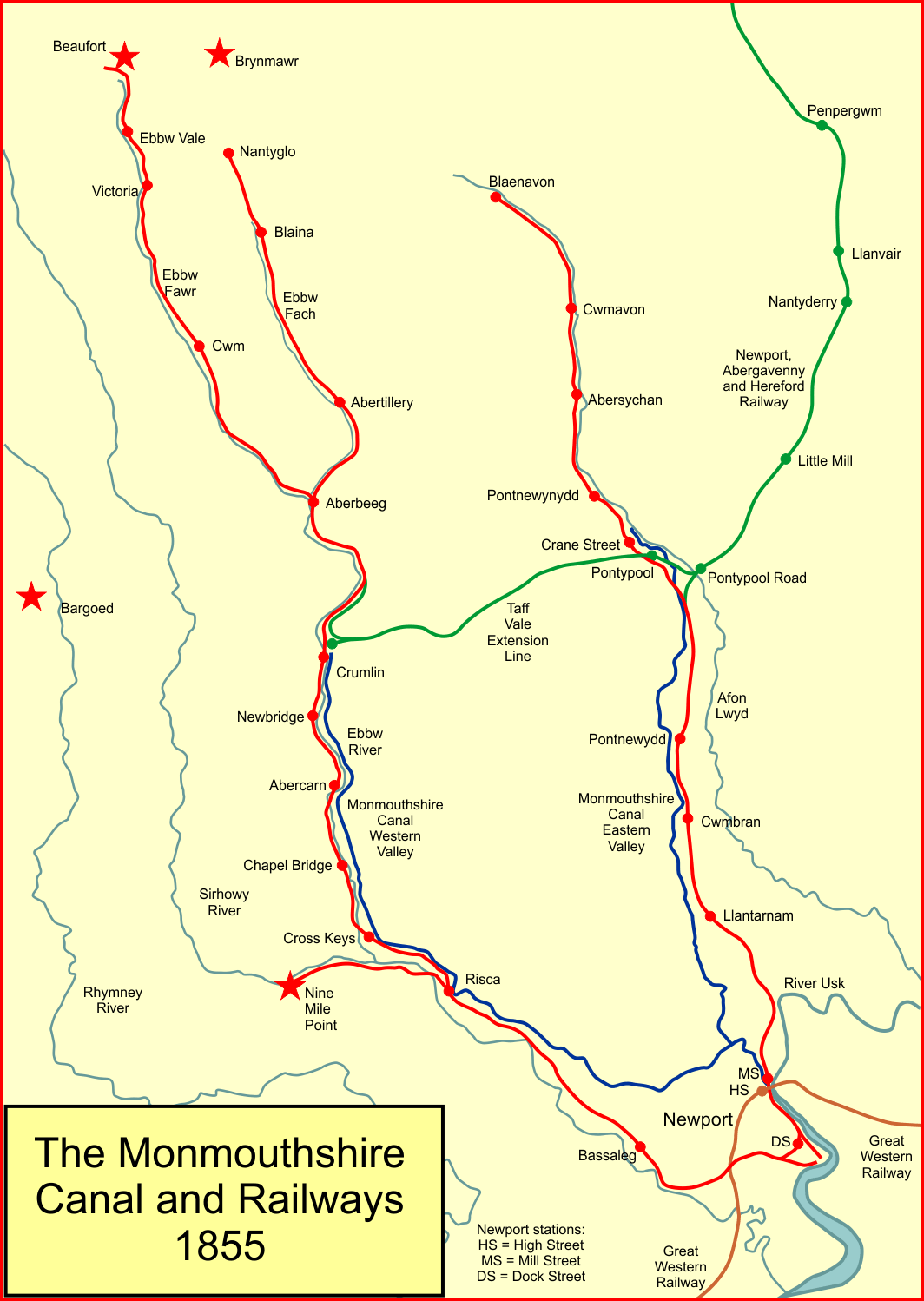
The Monmouthshire Railway and Canal system in 1855

The Newport to Risca (and Nine Mile Point) tramroad was extended from Risca to Crumlin in 1829, directly paralleling the canal. It became known as the Western Valley Line. Most of the traffic was still horse-drawn. The Rumney Tramroad was under construction, running on the eastern side of the Rhymney Valley it joined the Monmouthshire Tramway at Tydu (later named Bassaleg), and ran along the Park Mile. It was completed in 1836, and a further five carriers started to use the line, which was becoming seriously congested.

New locomotives had to be ordered for the Western Valley Line; the first was received from Grylls of Llanelly during December 1848. It weighed nearly 20 tons, more than double the weight of any locomotive previously seen on the Western Valley lines.

With the company absolved from the supply of mineral wagons, it now published a specification for the carriers' wagons so that they could operate together in trains, as few of the existing wagons were compatible with each other. The carriers had 4,000 wagons between them and there was a protest at the cost of converting them. Captain Simmons of the Board of Trade was called in to adjudicate.

In fact Simmons reviewed the whole of the company's proposed operation, and on 28 April 1849 they received his judgment. He was critical of the combination rail and wheel arrangement, and he recommended that "proper" railway track should be used, laid adjacent to the existing tramplate to allow for continued operation during the conversion. He wanted the railway fenced, and level crossing gates and signalling to be provided. All the wagons in use were unsuitable for a passenger carrying railway, and they had to be replaced with those of an approved type, with wrought iron wheels, springs and buffers.

A similar report had been received by the canal company in 1847, so that it was impossible to claim lack of knowledge of the recommendations, and the company was obliged to proceed with the work. By 1 August 1849 it appeared that opening to locomotive operation could take place. In fact eight new locomotives were delivered shortly before the proposed inauguration, but the combination tramplates were to be used. The locomotives were so heavy at about 20 tons, that widespread breakage of the new tram-plates took place, causing serious damage to the locomotives in addition. The company reverted to horse traction, and the intended passenger service was abandoned.

To ease the situation, Crawshay Bailey of Nantyglo offered them 2,000 tons of urgently needed rails, valued at £10,000, in exchange for an equivalent value of shares in the company. The new rails were of a completely different design to Barber's combination rail, and similar to the Great Western design of bridge rail which the South Wales Railway was laying on its line through Newport. The rail weighed 120 lbs. to the yard, and was described as a kind of rail and tramplate combined in such a way that neither would interfere with the other, but would allow the present antiquated trams and the locomotive engines to travel with perfect safety and ease.

David Jones, the new Company Engineer worked quickly, applying himself fully to the whole of the Western Valley section. Tenders were invited for booking offices and waiting rooms at Crumlin, Aberbeeg, Cwmtillery, Blaina and Ebbw Vale. Additional tenders were also invited for extra wagons suitable for carrying hay, straw, pitwood and coke.

Towards the end of 1850 the whole of the line had been re-laid on wooden sleepers, and at the sharp curves the new type of rail was laid, and the curves eased. Captain Laffan inspected the line on 15 October 1850, and at last the opening for passenger operation was approved. The work in the Western Valley had cost £136,000, and the line opened for passenger traffic on 23 December 1850. Initially there were two passenger trains a day in each direction. In fact at the half-yearly shareholders' meeting on 15 May 1850 it was announced that "as regards the western valleys the whole of the goods and mineral traffic is now conveyed by means of locomotive power".

With the passenger service to Blaina opened, improvements to the Beaufort branch from Aberbeeg Junction to Ebbw Vale were started, and sixteen months later, on 19 April 1852, a passenger service from Court-y-Bella to Ebbw Vale began. There were now three passenger trains daily from Newport, dividing at Aberbeeg Junction for the two onward routes.

On 4 August 1852 Dock Street station at Newport was brought into use, and the temporary terminus at Court-y-Bella was closed.

== A railway for the Eastern Valley ==
The operation of the tramroad gave an enormous boost to the efficiency of the coal and iron industries, but of course only in the areas of the Western Valley that it served. Important works and pits in the Eastern Valley were at a competitive disadvantage. The ironmasters of Eastern Monmouthshire were frustrated with the inaction of the Monmouthshire Company, and they decided that the solution was a new railway for both passengers and goods: the Newport and Nantyglo Railway, soon retitled the Monmouthshire Railway. The proprietors of the Monmouthshire Canal Navigation themselves proposed a railway to head off the competitive threat, and to alter all their tramroads to "make them suitable for locomotive haulage" and to become the carriers themselves.

Early in 1845 an accommodation was reached between the canal company and the promoters of the railway; the canal company would promote the necessary railway themselves.

Newport and Pontypool Railway Act 1845 (Note: Section 3.)
- Act of Parliament
- Parliament of the United Kingdom
- Long title: An Act to authorize the Company of Proprietors of the Monmouthshire Canal Navigation to make a Railway from Newport to Ponty Pool; and to enlarge the Powers of the several Acts relating to the said Company.
- Citation: 8 & 9 Vict. c. clxix
- Territorial extent: United Kingdom

Dates
- Royal assent: 31 July 1845
- Commencement: 31 July 1845 (Note: The Acts of Parliament (Commencement) Act 1793.)

Other legislation
- Amends: Monmouthshire Canal Navigation Act 1792; Monmouthshire Canal Navigation Act 1797

Text of statute as originally enacted

The Monmouthshire Canal Navigation got the Newport and Pontypool Railway Act 1845 (8 & 9 Vict. c. clxix), for the "Newport and Ponty Pool Railway", authorising it to build the railway, to use locomotives and become sole carriers. Authorised capital was £119,000. The act required it to make the new railway to standard gauge and to convert the whole of the Western Valley system to that gauge as well, except the Rassa, Blaendare and Cwmffrwd Tramroads, and to provide all the rolling stock for mineral traffic. To retain income during the conversion, the canal company had to find some way of allowing existing services to run while the work was being done. The company owned some 30 miles of tramroad, but there were just as many miles under private ownership, as well as the 22 miles of the connecting Rumney Tramroad, and 14 miles of the Sirhowy Tramroad. Some of the curves were sharper than 15 feet radius, an impossibility under locomotive operation.

The work involved closure of part of the upper end of the canal; the Pontnewynydd to Pontypool section was closed in 1849, and Pontypool to Pontymoile in 1853.

The company engineer, Edward Barber, designed a combination tramplate which provided an edge rail, and a special "combination" wheel that could run on a standard gauge edge rail track or the narrower tramplate track. Over 521 tons of improved wrought iron tramplates were purchased, and the cost of improvements by November 1846 was £17,742.

Newport and Pontypool Railway Amendment Act 1848
- Act of Parliament
- Parliament of the United Kingdom
- Long title: An Act to amend the Provisions of the Newport and Pontypool Railway Act, 1845.
- Citation: 11 & 12 Vict. c. cxx

Dates
- Royal assent: 14 August 1848

Other legislation
- Amends: Newport and Pontypool Railway Act 1845

Text of statute as originally enacted

At the time of authorisation of the Pontypool line in 1845, the company was heavily committed in upgrading its existing lines. A financial depression set in at this time, and money became impossible to obtain for railway schemes. As a result, the company was unable to complete the Newport and Pontypool Railway within the time limit set by Parliament. The Newport and Pontypool Railway Amendment Act 1848 (11 & 12 Vict. c. cxx) was passed, allowing an extension of time for construction, authority to carry passengers, and a change of name to the Monmouthshire Railway and Canal Company. They were freed from the obligation to provide mineral wagons, but locomotives remained their responsibility, and horse traction was to be prohibited when passenger operation started.

== A failed takeover ==
Monmouthshire Railway Act 1846
- Act of Parliament
- Parliament of the United Kingdom
- Long title: An Act for making certain Branch Railways to be connected with the Newport and Pontypool Railway, and for incorporating a new Company for carrying on the Monmouthshire Canal Navigation.
- Citation: 9 & 10 Vict. c. ccclxxi
- Territorial extent: United Kingdom

Dates
- Royal assent: 13 August 1846
- Commencement: 13 August 1846

Other legislation
- Amends: Monmouthshire Canal Navigation Act 1792; Monmouthshire Canal Navigation Act 1797
- Relates to: Monmouthshire Canal Navigation Act 1802

Text of statute as originally enacted

A new entity, the Monmouthshire Railway Company, obtained an act of Parliament, the Monmouthshire Railway Act 1846 (9 & 10 Vict. c. ccclxxi) giving them the authority to purchase the entire works of the Monmouthshire Canal system, including all the railways;

The First General Meeting of the Monmouthshire Railway Company was held [on 11 September 1846]... After congratulating the proprietors on obtaining the Act of Parliament, which received the Royal Assent on 13 August last, [the Managing Committee report] referred to the present state and future prospects of the Company. One of the objects which they had started was the purchase of Monmouthshire Canal Company, which beside its own course, had a connexion with some 50 or 60 miles of tramway travelling throughout its district. This canal had been purchased by the committee at £200 a share... Among the conditions of purchase it was left to the Canal Company to take shares in the railway in lieu of the purchase money... The Canal Company had not yet given notice of the number of shares that it might be their intention to take...

— Cardiff and Merthyr Guardian

Although the purchase had been authorised, the Monmouthshire Railway Company failed to raise the cash it needed for the purchase. The purchase was not completed, and the powers lapsed.

== More in the Eastern Valley ==
The ironmasters who had agitated for the Eastern Valley section of railway were displeased at the delay: work on the Pontypool to Newport line had been abandoned in the panic of 1847, while they had spent considerable sums on their pits and works in anticipation. The so-called Cardwell Clause in all railway acts enabled them to demand the completion of lines for which legal powers had been given in the act, and the issue turned acrimonious. A committee of investigation was appointed on 5 April 1851, and several directors lost their seats as a result. Work was now resumed and carried forward swiftly, and after an inspection Captain Simmons on 14 June 1852, the Newport and Pontypool Railway was opened to traffic on Wednesday 30 June 1852, from a temporary terminus at Marshes Turnpike Gate, Newport to the Crane Street station at Pontypool.

It was reported that "The extent of the railway is 8 miles of single track; the rails are 'Double T', weight 70 lbs. to the yard, on transverse sleepers 9 ft. long × 5ins. deep and 10ins. wide." There were six stations, the additional ones being Llantarnam and the temporary terminus at Marshes Turnpike Gate, Newport. Initially there were three passenger trains run each way.

On the same day that the Newport and Pontypool line was authorised in Parliament, the Newport, Abergavenny and Hereford Railway had also received its authorisation. That company had intended to build a line throughout from Newport, but Parliament objected to the building of two railways between Newport and Pontypool along pretty much the same ground, and obliged the NA&HR to use the Monmouthshire's line to reach Newport from a junction at Coed-y-Gric Farm near Pontypool. Accordingly, the Monmouthshire now started doubling their line to accommodate the extra traffic. In addition the line had to be completed from the temporary terminus at Marshes Turnpike Gate to Mill Street; this was opened on 9 March 1853.

The official opening of the NA&HR took place on 2 January 1854: five trains per day were run. The remaining three were mixed goods and passenger with third class accommodation, and had an intermediate stop at Pontnewydd.

== Improvements in Newport ==
The Eastern and Western Valley sections were not connected at Newport, due to objections from the town council to street running. An application was made in 1852 within a parliamentary bill to stop up the canal from the Mill Pond to Potter Street lock near the dock, and to seek more capital. A total of £200,000 was required to complete the conversion in the Western Valley, to provide a depot for carriages, locomotives and other stock, together with all the necessary buildings, workshops and essential machinery.

The bill was approved, allowing the money to be raised by the issuing of £150,000 of new share stock. The railway link between Mill St and Dock Street stations was authorised; the section of canal there was to be closed, and any carrier had the right to demand free carriage from the new canal terminus to the dock by the company in compensation for the loss of the canal section. All the existing tramroads had to be converted to edge rail and the independent users would be allowed three months by the company to alter their stock.

Dock Street station in Newport was brought into use on 4 August 1852 as the terminus for the Western Valley traffic; the temporary station at Courtybella was now closed. The Eastern Valley too received an improved Newport terminal: on 9 March 1852 the line was opened from Marshes Turnpike Gate to Mill Street.

A new branch line from Pill Bank to the Canal Parade, on the Western Valley section, was made in April 1854. Another new railway branch line connecting the east side of the dock with the Western, Eastern and Hereford lines was also made. Access to this east side over the canal was achieved by the installation of three lift bridges for the railway, leading on to the banks of sidings storing the full and empty wagons which serviced the dock.

== Enhancements on the network ==
A passenger service was started on the tramroad from Courtybella to Blaina in December 1850, and the line from Aberbeeg to Ebbw Vale was opened for passenger traffic on 19 April 1852. In 1853 the Eastern Valley Railway was opened for passengers only, from Pontypool to Mill Street, on 9 March 1852.

By 1 June 1854 the double line was extended from Pontypool Crane Street to Abersychan, but the rest of the line from Abersychan to Blaenavon remained single track. The line to Blaenavon was opened for passenger traffic on 1 October 1854. (Note: According to Byles; Barrie says goods 1 June 1854, passengers 2 October 1854, and MacDermot agrees.) Stations were provided at Pontnewynydd, Abersychan, Cwmavon and Blaenavon. Three trains per day were run, taking one hour to complete the journey.

Meanwhile, in the Western Valley, Charles Hodges the contractor was making rapid progress in the conversion to edge rail. One line was open on the Ebbw Vale branch and the greater part of the Blaina branch was complete by September. The following May, the management committee were told that the Eastern Valley and Western Valley lines were complete, with the exception of Nine Mile Point, which were to be proceeded with immediately. The line from Risca to Nine Mile Point was completed by November 1855 but not opened to passenger traffic until the Sirhowy Railway did so ten years later.

After the opening of the weekday services in the Western Valley, there was considerable pressure for a Sunday service, and this was started on 8 June 1851. Passenger business soon exceeded all expectations. It was said that on one Sunday evening twelve ordinary and three or four goods carriages were required. Sunday services were introduced on the Eastern Valley lines on 4 July 1852. The weekday services were increased from three to four per day, and then to five trains the following November, with three on Sunday.

In October 1855 a junction was made at Llanhilleth on the Western Valley line, forming a connection from the Taff Vale Extension line of the Newport, Abergavenny and Hereford Railway.

In 1858 the Western Valley Line was extended from Blaina to Nantyglo, and in 1864 the Cwmtillery branch was acquired; it had been built privately by a Mr Russell in 1858.

== External pressures ==
From about 1856 the structure of the coal and iron industries changed perceptibly; the iron manufacturing process was modernised and new foundries were developed, demanding a different mix of coal and iron ore. The Newport, Abergavenny and Hereford Railway (merged into the West Midland Railway in 1860) was pushing west with its Taff Vale Extension line, forming new connecting links with the valleys and making transport to and from the industrial north west of England a primary flow. Moreover, the Merthyr, Tredegar and Abergavenny Railway was being promoted by the London and North Western Railway (LNWR). At the same time the Monmouthshire Railway system was still technologically primitive, and income, and profitability, declined steeply. A lease to the West Midland Railway began to be considered, and early in 1861 agreement was struck; however shareholders rejected the proposal and decided to remain independent.

On 3 July 1863 there was a derailment at Cwmbran, and at the Board of Trade inquiry, the Inspecting Officer gave the view that the line was not adapted for high speeds and heavy main line engines. He indicated that the whole of the line from Coed-y-Gric to the Marshes Turnpike Gate had to be re-laid with new sleepers and rails, and the joints fish-plated.

In the Western Valley, certain private lines were brought into Monmouthshire ownership. The one-mile branch to Cwmtillery was transferred in August 1864. Further up the Ebbw Fach Valley, the Monmouthshire Railway had terminated at Coalbrook Vale, where it joined Joseph and Crawshay Bailey's tramroad to Brynmawr. The Monmouthshire Railway had established a goods station at Brynmawr from 15 December 1849, but for some years passenger services were not extended beyond Nantyglo Gate at Blaina. From June 1858, Monmouthshire Railway trains were admitted to a new passenger station and goods shed at Nantyglo. In August 1864, this section too was transferred to the Monmouthshire, and contracts for new stations at Abertillery, Blaina and Nantyglo were put in hand. The Nine Mile Point branch from Risca was upgraded for passenger traffic. After approval by the Board of Trade, it was thought that LNWR trains from the Sirhowy line would run into Newport from Tredegar, but this did not take place for some time.

On 1 January 1870 the LNWR opened a branch off the Merthyr and Abergavenny line from Brynmawr to Blaenavon Ironworks, giving them direct access to Blaenavon and other collieries.

== Acquisition of the Brecon Canal ==
Monmouthshire Railway and Canal Act 1865 (Note: Section 1.)
- Act of Parliament
- Parliament of the United Kingdom
- Long title: An Act for authorizing the Monmouthshire Railway and Canal Company to execute additional Works; to acquire the Brecon and Abergavenny Canal; to raise additional Capital; and for other Purposes relating to the same Company.
- Citation: 28 & 29 Vict. c. cclxxxi
- Territorial extent: United Kingdom

Dates
- Royal assent: 5 July 1865
- Commencement: 5 July 1865

Other legislation
- Amends: Monmouthshire Canal Navigation Act 1792; Brecknock and Abergavenny Canal Act 1793

Text of statute as originally enacted

In 1865 the Brecknock and Abergavenny Canal was purchased by the Monmouthshire Railway and Canal Company, having been authorised to do so by the Monmouthshire Railway and Canal Act 1865 (28 & 29 Vict. c. cclxxxi). The commercial value of the canal is unclear, and the Monmouthshire had recently been offered, and had refused, acquisition of the Sirhowy Railway, which fell to the LNWR instead. The canal purchase cost the company £36,000, and in the first years tolls derived from traffic had come to £1,470 but essential repairs and maintenance had cost £1,274, leaving a working profit of £196.

== The Caerleon line ==
In the parliamentary session of 1865 a new and rival company, the Pontypool, Caerleon and Newport Railway, was authorised by the Pontypool, Caerleon and Newport Railway Act 1865 (28 & 29 Vict. c. ccclxiv). The Great Western Railway, as successors to the Newport, Abergavenny and Hereford Railway (and in turn the West Midland Railway) had their line to Hereford from Pontypool, but had to rely on the Monmouthshire Company's Eastern Valley Line between there and Newport. The new company was to acquire the old Caerleon Tramroad and convert it to a modern railway route between Maindee, immediately east of the GWR station at Newport High Street, and Pontypool, by-passing the entire Eastern Valley line.

The Pontypool, Caerleon and Newport Railway Amendment Act 1868 (31 & 32 Vict. c. cxxxvii) had received royal assent on 13 July 1868, but the GWR, as its sponsor, was heavily committed at the time in converting the track gauge of much of its network from broad gauge to narrow (standard gauge). The Pontypool, Caerleon and Newport Railway was opened for goods traffic on 18 September 1874. Coal trains from Aberdare were re-routed by the Great Western over the Taff Vale Extension line to Pontypool Road, and along the Caerleon line to the South Wales main line at Maindee Junction, diverting much business away from the Monmouthshire network. The effect was marked: six months after the Pontypool, Caerleon and Newport Railway opened, Monmouthshire income was £455 less than for the previous half year, and £3,274 down on the previous year. Passenger operation started on 21 December 1874.

== Network extensions ==
In 1870 two short branches were opened from Pontnewynydd, forking at Branches Fork Junction and proceeding to Cwmffrwdoer and Cwmnantddu respectively. Both were very steeply graded and served several pits and a clay mine. The Cwmffrwdoer branch had gradients of 1 in 22 but the Cwmnantddu branch had 1 in 19, an exceptional gradient for adhesion lines. Ascending the gradient, the locomotive was required to propel the train, but the brake van was next to the locomotive, restricting the driver's view. Two guards were required, one in the leading wagon and one in the van relaying the front guard's signals to the driver. Between 1888 and 1890 the GWR built four special vans for these duties: they had low bodies, less than 11 feet from rail level. They were replaced by new vans in 1949, and these were scrapped in 1968.

On 18 September 1879 a third branch was opened from Trevethin Junction, a little south of Pontnewynydd, to Abersychan & Talywain. It formed a tight semi-circle over the Cwmffrwdoer and Cwmnantddu branches. This last branch had a passenger service, and from 1912 rail motor trains were introduced, coupled with the provision of several halts for the service.

== Taken over by the Great Western Railway ==
In 1874 the Monmouthshire Company had started negotiations to acquire the Sirhowy Railway, but after some time these fell through. The Great Western Railway (GWR) stepped in and apparently agreed the acquisition. Believing that they now had possession of the Sirhowy line, they realised that they could greatly improve the route for the heavy mineral traffic from Aberdare via Pontypool if they built a new 8-mile line from Nine Mile Point to Caerleon. This would cut across the Western Valley Line and abstract business from it. The directors of the Monmouthshire were disconcerted by this development, and they approached the GWR to acquire their own line. In the absence of parliamentary authorisation, this was not possible in the short term, but after consideration running powers over the whole Monmouthshire system were granted to the GWR.

Great Western and Monmouthshire Railways Amalgamation Act 1880
- Act of Parliament
- Parliament of the United Kingdom
- Long title: An Act for amalgamating the Monmouthshire Railway and Canal Company with the Great Western Railway Company.
- Citation: 43 & 44 Vict. c. cx

Dates
- Royal assent: 2 August 1880

Text of statute as originally enacted

It was announced that the Great Western would take possession of the whole of the Monmouthshire lines, rolling stock and appliances, and from 1 August 1875, and would guarantee to pay a fixed dividend of 6 1/2% to ordinary Monmouthshire Railway Company shareholders. The Monmouthshire Railway Company was amalgamated with the Great Western Railway on 1 August 1880 by the Great Western and Monmouthshire Railways Amalgamation Act 1880 (43 & 44 Vict. c. cx). The Monmouthshire Railway Company's profitability had been good in recent years, averaging 5 to 6%, and the settlement of acquisition got them £130 of Great Western Guaranteed 5% Stock for every £100 of Monmouthshire Ordinary. (The Sirhowy Railway was in fact acquired by the London and North Western Railway.)

The GWR naturally wanted to centralise passenger operation at Newport, and in 1878 a start was made on a 3/4 mile link line between Llantarnam and the Eastern Valley line at Cwmbran, enabling trains from the upper parts of the Eastern Valley lines to reach Maindee and Newport over the Caerleon line. It opened in April 1878. A similar link—the Gaer Loop—was made from the Western Valley lines west of Newport Tunnel, enabling traffic from them, and also from the Brecon and Merthyr and the Sirhowy lines, to reach Newport High Street. It opened on 1 January 1879.

New stations were built at Cwmbran and Coed-y-Gric Junction (Panteg and Griffithstown) on the Caerleon line. Newport High Street Station was completely rebuilt and enlarged to receive the new traffic, and reopened on 11 March 1880. Dock Street, Mill Street, Llantarnam and the old Cwmbran stations were closed, and all passenger traffic from the Eastern and Western Valleys was diverted into the modernised station at High Street.

== The twentieth century ==
The original route from the Western Valley to Pillgwenlly on the Usk in Newport had long been duplicated by the through line from Dock Street to Mill Street uniting the Western and Eastern Valley lines. In the course of time innumerable connections had been made to wharves and depots on the later route. In 1907 the original route, designated the Cardiff Road lines, was closed. It had run from Courtybella Junction, forking to Llanarth Street Junction and Dock Street station.

During World War I Newport became the third largest coal exporting port in the United Kingdom. Additional sidings were laid at Pontypool for the Admiralty coal traffic, making the marshalling yards the largest in Wales and the West of England.

From the end of the war, motor bus services, primitive at first, were operated in competition with the railways. At the same time the local transport of goods by road increased, and revenues fell. The passenger service from Newport via Pontypool to Talywain was withdrawn from 5 May 1941. The decline continued and after nationalisation of the railways in 1948 were considered to be unsustainable. Passenger services were withdrawn from both Western and Eastern Valleys on 30 April 1962.

== Closures ==
Passenger services to Blaenavon High Level and Brynmawr over the GWR and LNWR Talywain branch ceased in May 1941 as a wartime economy, but the services never resumed after the end of hostilities. The passenger service to Blaenavon Low Level closed on 30 April 1962.

The line from Newport to Cwmbran closed on 27 October 1963, with traffic being transferred to the Pontypool, Caerleon and Newport Railway route. The rundown in the local mining industry and the closure of a local brickworks also led to the closure of the Cwmnantddu and Cwmffrwdoer lines in 1962 and 1967 respectively, and when, on 3 May 1980 the Big Pit coal mine closed, the remainder of the railway line closed with it.

A number of rail enthusiast passenger specials ran between 1968 and 1981, but as the track from Trevethin Junction to Blaenavon Low level had been lifted in the 1960s they had followed the route of the High Level line. The line was severed in July 1982 when a double-decker bus ferrying day-trip passengers on a route normally only used by single-deck buses, crashed into a low bridge in Pontrhydyrun. Six people were killed and the bridge was demolished, as well as the two bridges that made up the Llantarnam Link in Cwmbran as a precaution.

In 1983 the remainder of the track was lifted except for a section of the northern extension of the line which is in preservation as the Pontypool and Blaenavon Railway.

In 1988, Cwmbran Drive A4051 road was opened by the Cwmbran Development Corporation, following the original railway line from Malpas to Sebastopol.

== Ebbw Vale line reopening ==
In 2008 the Western Valley Line was reopened for passenger traffic between Cardiff and Ebbw Vale Parkway; it was extended to Ebbw Vale Town in 2015.

== Mural ==
A large commemorative mural has been installed within the pedestrian subway system near Newport Castle.

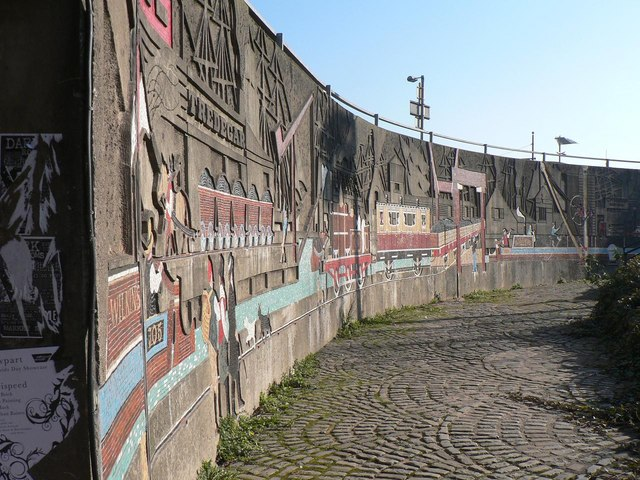

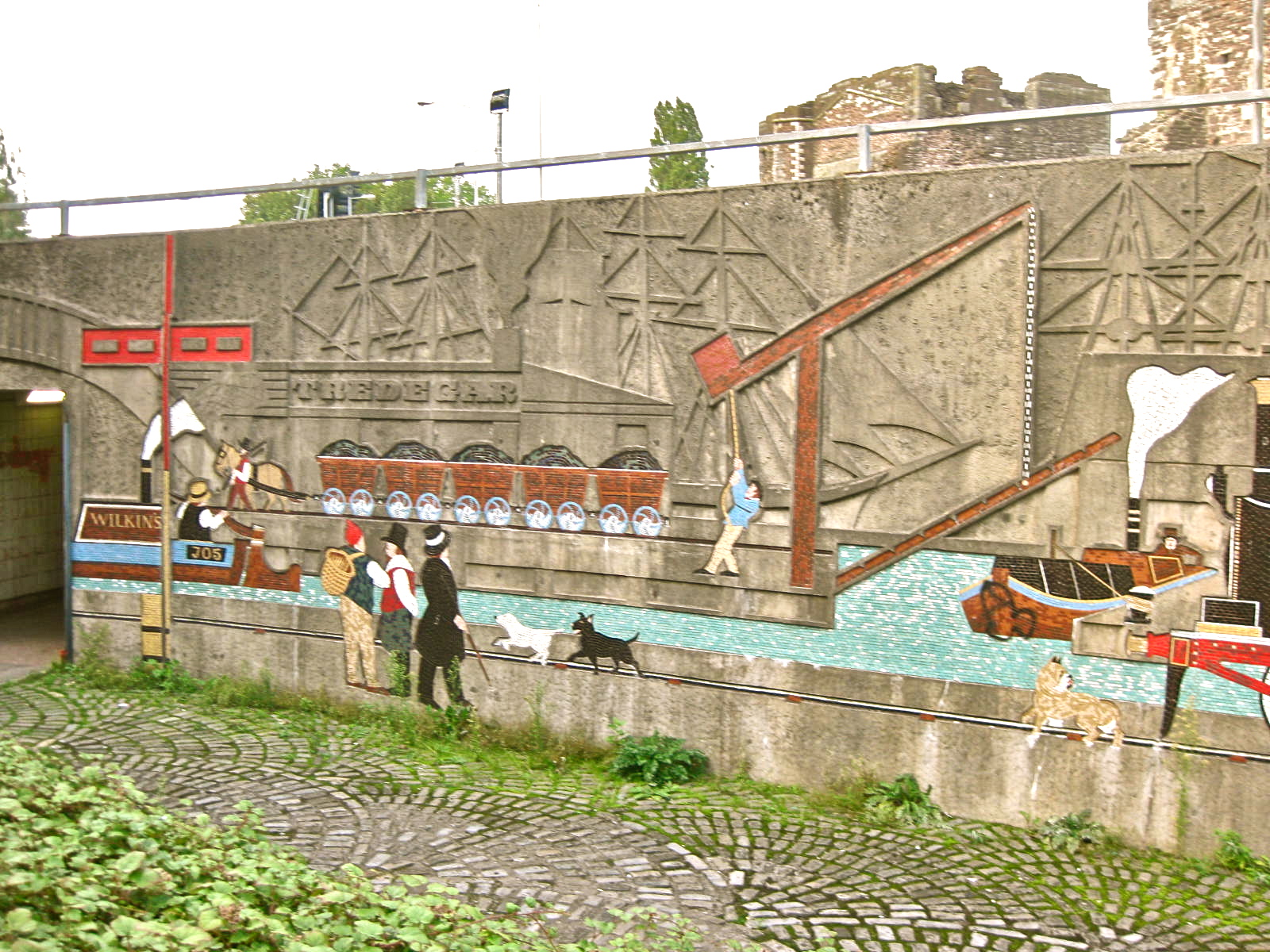

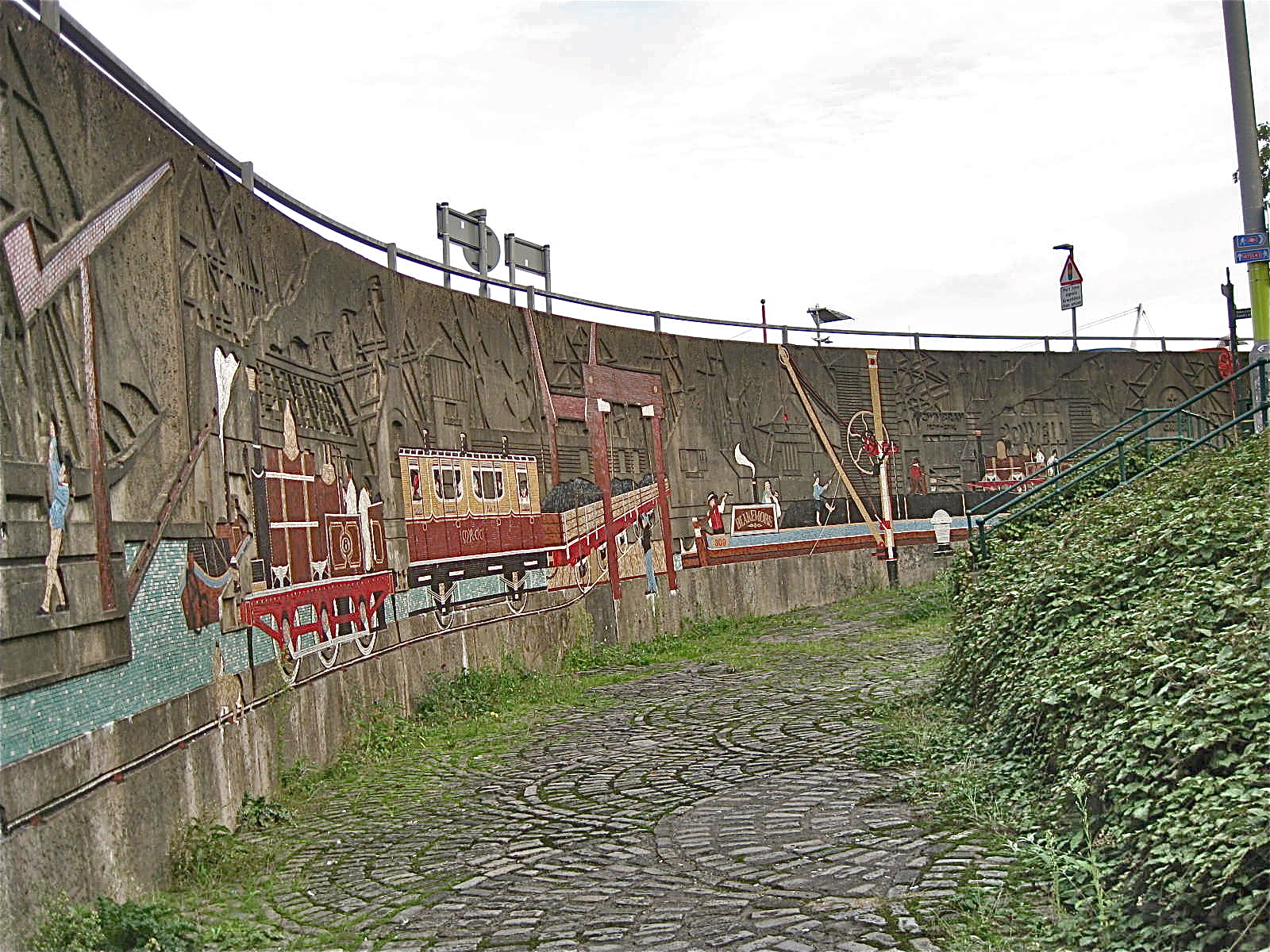

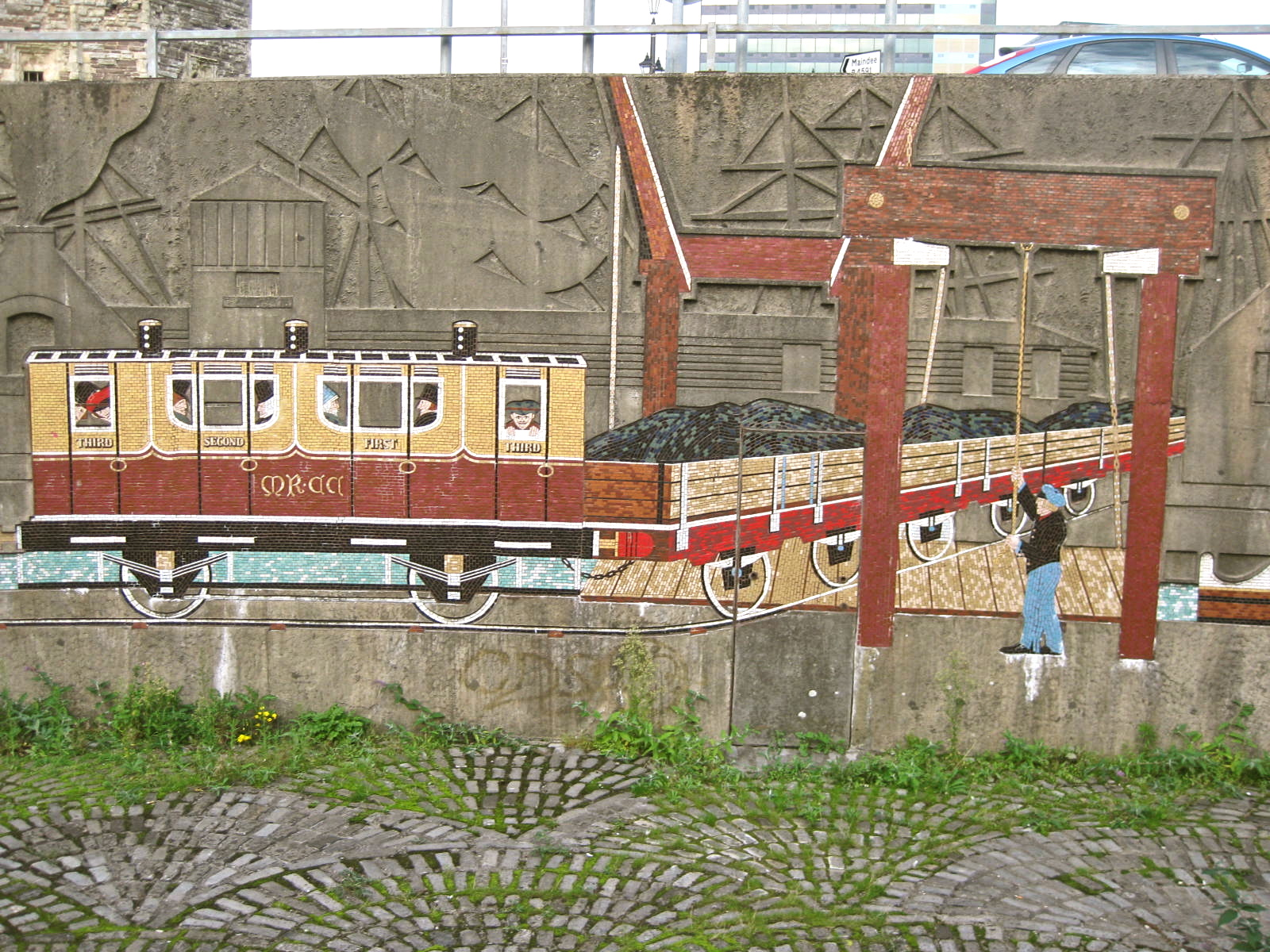

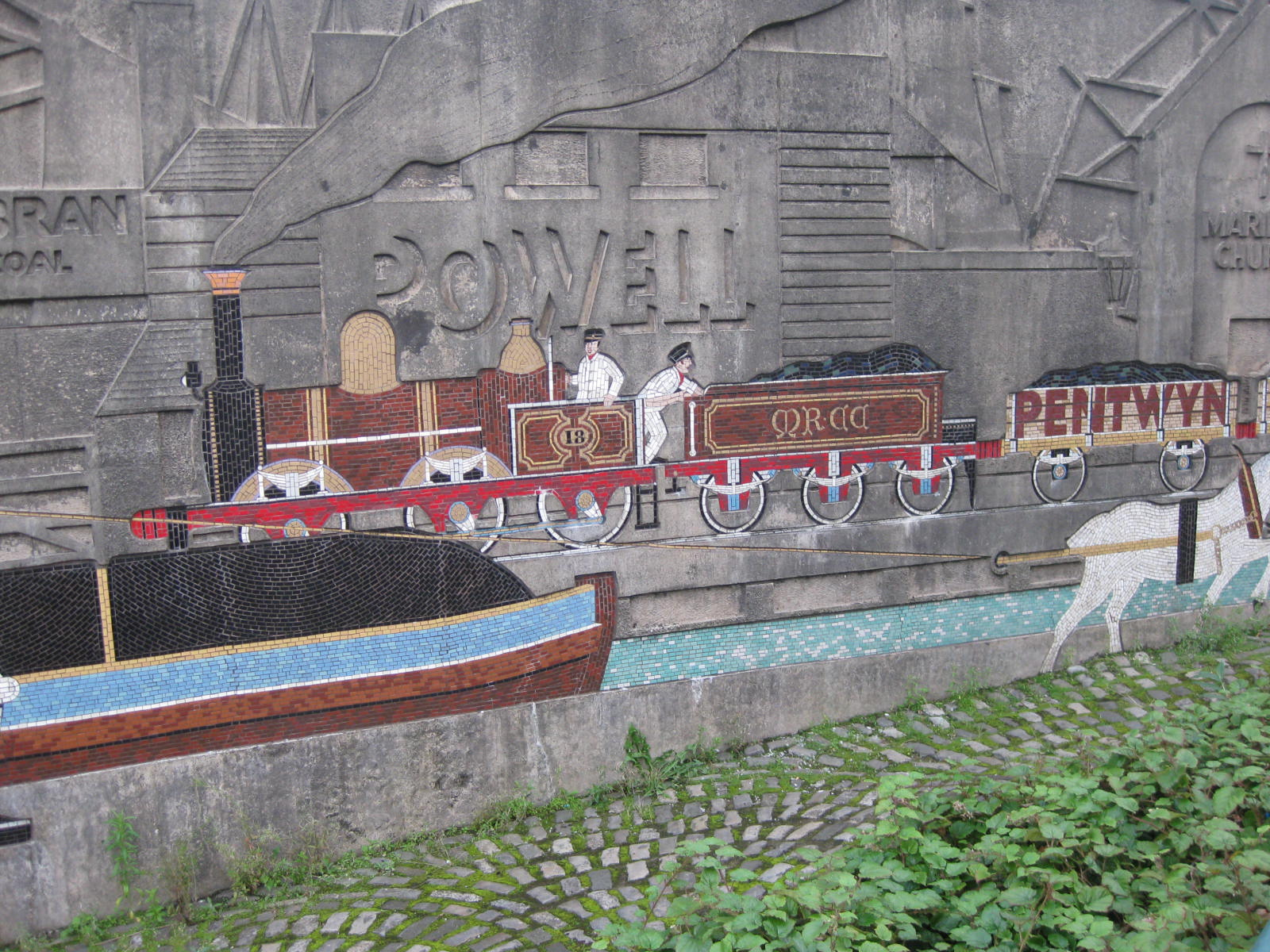

== Topography ==
=== Western Valley main line ===
- Beaufort Iron Works;
- Ebbw Vale; opened 19 April 1852; renamed Ebbw Vale Low Level 1950; closed 30 April 1962;
- Ebbw Vale Town; opened 17 May 2015; still open;
- Tyllwyn Halt; opened 29 November 1943; closed 30 April 1962;
- Ebbw Vale Steelworks;
- Victoria; opened by August 1852; closed 30 April 1962; reopened as Ebbw Vale Parkway 6 February 2008; still open;
- Waunllwyd Colliery;
- Cwm; opened 19 April 1852; closed 30 April 1962;
- Marine Colliery Platform; opened 1890; closed 2 October 1961;
- Aberbeeg; opened 23 December 1850; closed 30 April 1962;
- Llanhilleth; opened by August 1853; closed 30 April 1962; reopened 27 April 2008; still open;
- Llanhilleth Middle Jn; spur diverged to Taff Vale Extension line;
- Crumlin Low Level; opened 23 December 1850; closed 30 April 1962;
- Celynen North; opened 10 August 1936; closed 30 April 1962; unadvertised halt for miners;
- Newbridge; opened 23 December 1850; closed 30 April 1962; reopened 6 February 2008;
- Celynen; opened 14 August 1933; renamed Celynen South April 1936; closed 30 April 1962;
- Abercarn; opened 23 December 1850; closed 30 April 1962;
- Chapel Bridge; opened May 1855; closed 1 July 1876;
- Cwmcarn; opened 2 March 1925; closed 30 April 1962;
- Cross Keys; opened September 1851; closed 30 April 1962; reopened as Crosskeys 7 June 2008; still open;
- Halls Road Junction; convergence of Halls Road branch;
- Risca; opened 23 December 1850; closed 30 April 1962; reopened as Risca and Pontymister 6 February 2008; still open;
- Tynycwm Halt; opened 17 April 1935; closed 30 April 1962;
- Tydee; opened by August 1851; soon renamed Tydu; renamed Rogerstone 1898; closed 30 April 1962; new station opened on a different site on 6 February 2008; still open;
- Pye Corner; opened 14 December 2014; still open;
- Rhymney Junction; opened 23 December 1850; renamed Bassaleg 1858; closed 1 January 1917; reopened 3 March 1919; renamed Bassaleg Junction 1924; closed 30 April 1962;;
- Park Jn; divergence of spur to Gaer Junction on GWR main line;
- Maesglas Jn; convergence of Brecon and Merthyr Railway;
- Newport Courtybella; opened 23 December 1850; closed 4 August 1852;
- Salutation Junction; divergence of connecting line to Mill Street;
- Newport Dock Street; opened 4 August 1852; closed 1 June 1880.

The line closed from Beaufort Iron Works to Ebbw Vale station in 1952; and from there to Ebbw Vale Works in 1975; and the section from Waunllwyd Colliery to Ebbw Vale Works was closed from 1976 - 1989. Park Junction to Courtybella closed in 1981.

The Cwmtillery Colliery branch closed in 1962.

=== Ebbw Fach branch ===
- Nantyglo; opened 16 May 1859; closed 30 April 1962; end on junction with Brynmawr and Western Valleys Joint Line;
- Coalbrookvale Ironworks;
- Blaina; opened 23 December 1850; closed 30 April 1962;
- Tylers Arms Platform; opened July 1897, for miners only; renamed Bournville Halt 30 October 1933 and made public; closed 30 April 1962;
- Rose Heyworth Colliery;
- Abertillery; opened 23 December 1850; closed 30 April 1962;
- Six Bells Halt; opened 27 September 1937; closed 30 April 1962;
- Six Bells Colliery; opened by July 1897 private halt for miners; closed by July 1902;
- Aberbeeg (above).

The line closed from Nantyglo to Coalbrookvale in 1983. From Coalbrookvale to Blaina closed in 1973, from which time Coalbrookvale was served from the north. Blaina to Rose Heyworth Colliery closed in 1976, and Rose Heyworth Colliery to Aberbeeg closed in 1984.

=== Nine Mile Point branch ===
- Nine Mile Point; opened by July 1868; closed 2 February 1959; end on junction with the Sirhowy Railway;
- Risca (above).

The line closed in 1970.

=== Eastern Valley ===
- Blaenavon; opened 2 October 1854; renamed Blaenavon Low Level 1950; closed 30 April 1962;
- Cwmavon; opened 2 October 1854; renamed Cwmavon Halt 1953; closed 30 April 1962;
- Cwmffrwyd Halt; opened 13 July 1912; closed 30 April 1962;
- Abersychan; opened 2 October 1854; renamed Abersychan Low Level 1885; closed 30 April 1962;
- Snatchwood Halt; opened 13 July 1912; closed 5 October 1953;
- Pontnewynydd; opened 2 October 1854; closed 30 April 1962;
- Trevethin Junction; convergence of Varteg Colliery line;
- Pontypool; opened 1 July 1852; renamed Pontypool Crane Street 1881; closed 30 April 1962;
- Pontypool Blaendare Road Halt; opened 30 April 1928; closed 30 April 1962;
- Coedygric Junction; convergence of Newport, Abergavenny and Hereford Railway;
- Panteg and Griffithstown; opened 21 December 1874; closed 30 April 1962;
- Sebastopol; opened 28 May 1928; closed 30 April 1962;
- Pontrhydyrun; opened 1 July 1852; closed 1 January 1917;
- Pontrhydyrhun Halt; opened 17 July 1933; closed 30 April 1962;
- Pontnewydd; opened 1 July 1852; renamed Upper Pontnewydd 1881; closed 30 April 1962;
- Cwmbran Junction; divergence of link line to Pontypool, Caerleon and Newport Railway;
- Cwmbran; opened 1 July 1852; closed 1 August 1880;
- Llantarnam; opened by May 1853; closed 1 August 1880;
- Marshes Turnpike Gate; opened 1 July 1852; closed 9 March 1853;
- Mill Street; opened 9 March 1853; closed 1 August 1880;
- Llanarth Street Junction; divergence of connecting line to Salutation Junction (above).
- Newport Docks.

Blaenavon to Snatchwood closed in 1962; Snatchwood to Pontnewynydd closed in 1963; Cwmbran Junction to Pontnewynydd closed in 1980. Cwmbran Junction to Mill Street closed in 1963; Mill Street to Dock Street closed 1966; Courtybella to Dock Street closed in 1991.

=== Varteg branch ===
- Varteg Station; opened May 1878; closed 5 May 1941
- Six Bells Halt; opened 1912; renamed Garndiffaith Halt,1922; closed 5 May 1941;
- Abersychan and Talywain; opened May 1878; closed 5 May 1941;
- Pentwyn Halt; opened 13 July 1912; closed 5 May 1941;
- Pentrepiod Halt; opened 13 July 1912; closed 5 May 1941;
- Cwmffrwydoer Halt; opened 13 July 1912; closed 5 May 1941;
- Wainfelin Halt; opened 13 July 1912; closed 30 April 1917; reopened 30 April 1928; closed 5 May 1941;
- Trevethin Junction; (above).

Varteg Colliery closed in 1968; Abersychan and Talywain to Trevethin Junction closed in 1980. The Cwmffrwdoer and Cwmnantddu branches closed in 1960.

== See also ==
- Railway stations in Newport
- Monmouthshire & Brecon Canal
