= List of closed railway stations in Great Britain: T–V =

The list of closed railway stations in Great Britain includes the following: Year of closure is given if known. Stations reopened as heritage railways continue to be included in this list and some have been linked. Some stations have been reopened to passenger traffic. Some lines remain in use for freight and mineral traffic.

== T ==
=== Ta ===
Station (Town, unless in station name)	Rail company	Year closed
Tadcaster	York and North Midland Railway	1964
Taff Merthyr Colliery Halt	GWR	1964
Takeley	Great Eastern Railway	1952
Talacre	London and North Western Railway	1966
Talerddig	Cambrian Railways	1965
Talgarth	Cambrian Railways	1962
Talley Road Halt	Vale of Towy Railway	1955
Tallington	GNR	1959
Talsarn Halt	GWR	1951
Tal-y-Bont (Ceredigion) (also known as "Talybont")	Plynlimon and Hafan Tramway	1898
Talybont-on-Usk	Brecon and Merthyr Tydfil Junction Railway	1962
Talyllyn	Mid Wales Railway	1878
Talyllyn (Brynderwen)	Brecon and Merthyr Tydfil Junction Railway	1869
Talyllyn Junction	Brecon and Merthyr Tydfil Junction Railway	1962
Tamerton Foliot	London and South Western Railway	1962
Tanfield	NER	1931
Tanfield Lea	Brandling Junction Railway	1844
Tanhouse Lane (Widnes)	Great Central and Midland Joint Railway	1964
Tankerton Halt	South Eastern and Chatham Railway	1931
Tannadice	Caledonian Railway	1952
Tan-y-Manod	Festiniog and Blaenau Railway	1883
Tarbolton	Glasgow and South Western Railway	1943
Tarff	Glasgow and South Western Railway	1965
Tarleton Halt	Lancashire and Yorkshire Railway	1913
Tarset	North British Railway	1956
Tatham Bridge	Midland Railway	1850
Tattenhall	London and North Western Railway	1957
Tattenhall Road	London and North Western Railway	1966
Tattershall	GNR	1963
Tauchers Platform	London, Midland and Scottish Railway	1964
Tavistock North	London and South Western Railway	1968
Tavistock South	GWR	1962
Tayport	North British Railway	1966

=== Te ===
Station (Town, unless in station name)	Rail company	Year closed
Tean Halt	North Staffordshire Railway	1953
Tebay	London and North Western Railway	1968
Teigl Halt	GWR	1960
Teigngrace Halt	GWR	1959
Telford Coalbrookdale	British Railways	1979
Temple Hirst	North Eastern Railway	1961
Temple Sowerby	North Eastern Railway	1953
Templecombe	London & South Western Railway	1966 reopened 1983
Templecombe Lower	Somerset and Dorset Joint Railway	1966
Templeton	GWR	1964
Tempsford	GNR	1956
Tenbury Wells	Tenbury Railway	1962
Tenterden St. Michael's	Kent and East Sussex Light Railway	1954
Tenterden Town	Kent and East Sussex Light Railway	1954 (reopened 1974)
Tern Hill	GWR	1963
Terrington	Midland and Great Northern Joint Railway	1959
Teston Crossing Halt	South Eastern and Chatham Railway	1959
Tetbury	GWR	1964
Tetbury Road	GWR	1882
Tettenhall	GWR	1932
Teversall Manor	Midland Railway	1930 regular services 1963 special services
Tewkesbury	Midland Railway	1864; 1961

=== Th ===
Station (Town, unless in station name)	Rail company	Year closed
Thackley	GNR	1931
Thame	GWR	1963
Thames Haven	London Tilbury and Southend Railway	1880
Thankerton	Caledonian Railway	1965
Thaxted	Great Eastern Railway	1952
The Avenue	Blyth and Tyne Railway	1864
The Dyke	Brighton and Dyke Railway	1939
The Hawthorns Halt	Great Western Railway	1968 reopened 1995
The Lane Halt	Bideford, Westward Ho! and Appledore Railway	1917
The Lodge Halt	GWR	1931
The Mound	Highland Railway	1960
The Oaks	Lancashire and Yorkshire Railway	1950
The Pilot Inn or The Pilot Halt	Romney, Hythe and Dymchurch Railway	1977
Theddingworth	London and North Western Railway	1966
Theddlethorpe	Great Northern Railway	1960
Thelwall	London and North Western Railway	1956
Thetford Bridge	Great Eastern Railway	1953
Thirsk Town	Leeds Northern Railway	1855
Thongs Bridge	Lancashire and Yorkshire Railway	1959
Thorganby	Derwent Valley Light Railway	1926
Thorington	Great Eastern Railway	1957
Thornbridge Halt	Caledonian Railway	1938
Thornbury	Midland Railway	1944
Thorne (Old)	South Yorkshire Railway	1866
Thorne Lock or Thorne Waterside	South Yorkshire Railway	1859
Thorner	North Eastern Railway	1964
Thorney	Midland and Great Northern Joint Railway	1957
Thorney and Kingsbury Halt	GWR	1964
Thorneybank	Lancashire and Yorkshire Railway	1866
Thorneyburn	North British Railway	1956
Thorney Wood	GNR	1916
Thornfalcon	GWR	1962
Thornhill (Dewsbury)	Lancashire and Yorkshire Railway	1962
Thornhill (Dumfries)	Glasgow and South Western Railway	1965
Thornielee	North British Railway	1950
Thornley	North Eastern Railway	1952
Thornton (Stag and Castle Inn)	Leicester and Swannington Railway	1842
Thornton (West Yorkshire)	GNR	1955
Thornton Curtis	Manchester, Sheffield and Lincolnshire Railway	1848
Thornton Dale	North Eastern Railway	1950
Thornton Junction	North British Railway	1969
Thornton Lane	Midland Railway	1865
Thornton-Cleveleys	Preston and Wyre Joint Railway	1970
Thornton-in-Craven	Midland Railway	1970
Thorp Arch	North Eastern Railway	1964
Thorpe	LNWR	1964
Thorpe Cloud	London and North Western Railway	1954
Thorpe Thewles	North Eastern Railway	1931
Thorpeness	Great Eastern Railway	1966
Thorpe-on-the-Hill	Midland Railway	1955
Thor's Cave	North Staffordshire Railway	1934
Thorverton	GWR	1963
Thrapston Bridge Street	LNWR	1964
Thrapston Midland Road	Midland Railway	1959
Three Cocks Junction	Cambrian Railways	1962
Three Counties	GNR	1959
Threlkeld	Cockermouth, Keswick and Penrith Railway	1972
Thringstone Halt	London and North Western Railway	1931
Throsk	Caledonian Railway	1966
Thrumpton (Retford)	Manchester, Sheffield and Lincolnshire Railway/Great Central Railway	1859
Thrumster	Highland Railway	1944
Thrybergh Tins	British Railways	1968
Thurgoland	Sheffield, Ashton-under-Lyne and Manchester Railway	1847
Thurlby	GNR	1951
Thurnby and Scraptoft	GNR	1953 regular services, 1962 summer weekend services
Thursford	Midland and Great Northern Joint Railway	1959
Thurstaston	Birkenhead Joint Railway	1954
Thuxton	Great Eastern Railway	1969
Thwaites	Midland Railway	1909

=== Ti ===
Station (Town, unless in station name)	Rail company	Year closed
Tibbermuir	Caledonian Railway	1951
Tibshelf and Newton	Midland Railway	1930
Tibshelf Town	Great Central Railway	1963
Tickhill and Wadworth	South Yorkshire Joint Railway	1929
Tidal Basin	Eastern Counties Railway	1943
Tiddington	GWR	1963
Tidenham	GWR	1959
Tidworth	Midland and South Western Junction Railway	1955
Tiffield	Northampton and Banbury Junction Railway	1871
Tilbury Marine	London, Midland and Scottish Railway	1932
Tilbury Riverside	London, Tilbury and Southend Railway	1992
Tillicoultry	North British Railway	1964
Tillietudlem	Caledonian Railway	1951
Tillyfourie	Great North of Scotland Railway	1950
Tillynaught	Great North of Scotland Railway	1968
Tilmanstone Colliery Yard	East Kent Light Railway	1930
Tilton	Great Northern and London and North Western Joint Railway	1953
Tingley	GNR	1954
Tinkers Green Halt	GWR	1965
Tinsley	South Yorkshire Railway	1951
Tintern	GWR	1959
Tipton Five Ways	Great Western Railway	1962
Tipton St Johns	London and South Western Railway	1967
Tiptree	Great Eastern Railway	1951
Tissington	London and North Western Railway	1954
Tisted	London and South Western Railway	1955
Titley Junction	GWR	1955
Tiverton	GWR	1964
Tiverton Junction	GWR	1986
Tivetshall	Great Eastern Railway	1966
Tivoli	South Eastern Railway (UK)	circa 1872

=== To ===
Station (Town, unless in station name)	Rail company	Year closed
Tochieneal	Great North of Scotland Railway	1951
Tod Point	North Eastern Railway	1873
Todd Lane Junction	Lancashire and Yorkshire Railway	1968
Toddington	GWR	1960 (reopened by Gloucestershire and Warwickshire Railway)
Tollcross	Caledonian Railway	1964
Toller	GWR	1975
Tollerton	North Eastern Railway	1965
Tollesbury	Great Eastern Railway	1951
Tollesbury Pier	Great Eastern Railway	1921
Tolleshunt d'Arcy	Great Eastern Railway	1951
Tolleshunt Knights	Great Eastern Railway	1951
Tomatin	Highland Railway	1965
Ton Llwyd Halt	GWR	1933
Tondu	GWR	1970 reopened 1992
Tonge and Breedon	Midland Railway	1930
Tongham	London and South Western Railway	1937
Tongwynlais	Cardiff Railway	1931
Tonmawr Junction	South Wales Mineral Railway	1930
Tonteg Halt	Taff Vale Railway	1930
Tonteg Halt	GWR	1962
Tonyrefail	GWR	1958
Tooting Junction	Tooting, Merton and Wimbledon Railway	1894 replaced by present Tooting
Topcliffe	North Eastern Railway	1959
Torksey	Great Central Railway	1959
Torpantau	Brecon and Merthyr Tydfil Junction Railway	1962
Torphins	Great North of Scotland Railway	1966
Torrance	North British Railway	1951
Torrington	London and South Western Railway	1965
Torryburn	North British Railway	1930
Torver	Furness Railway	1958
Tottington	Lancashire and Yorkshire Railway	1952
Tovil	South Eastern Railway (UK)	1943
Tow Law	North Eastern Railway	1956
Towcester	Stratford-upon-Avon and Midland Junction Railway	1952
Tower Hill (Devon)	London and South Western Railway	1966
Tower Hill (London) – was Mark Lane	Metropolitan Railway	1967
Tower of London	Metropolitan Railway	1884
Towersey Halt	GWR	1963
Towiemore Halt	London and North Eastern Railway	1968
Towneley	Lancashire and Yorkshire Railway	1952
Toxteth Dock	Liverpool Overhead Railway	1956

=== Tr ===
Station (Town, unless in station name)	Rail company	Year closed
Trabboch	Glasgow and South Western Railway	1951
Tram Inn	GWR	1958
Tram Road (Pontypridd)	Alexandra (Newport and South Wales) Docks and Railway	1922
Tranmere	Chester and Birkenhead Railway	1857
Traveller's Rest (Abercynon)	Taff Vale Railway	1932
Travis Street (Manchester)	Manchester and Birmingham Railway	1842
Trawscoed	GWR	1964
Trawsfynydd	GWR	1960
Trawsfynydd Lake Halt	GWR	1960
Treborth	London and North Western Railway	1959
Trecynon Halt	GWR	1964
Tredegar	London and North Western Railway	1960
Treeton	Midland Railway	1951
Trefeglwys	Van Railway/Cambrian Railways	1879
Trefeinon	Cambrian Railways	1962
Trefnant	London and North Western Railway	1955
Treforest Halt	Alexandra (Newport and South Wales) Docks and Railway	1956
Treforest (High Level)	Barry Railway	1930
Tregaron	GWR	1965
Tregarth	London and North Western Railway	1951
Treharris	GWR	1964
Trehowell Halt	GWR	1951
Trelewis Halt	GWR	1964
Trelewis Platform	GWR	1964
Treloar's Hospital Platform	London & South Western Railway	1939
Tremains Platform	Great Western Railway	1961
Trench Crossing	London and North Western Railway	1964
Trench Halt	Cambrian Railways	1962
Trenholme Bar	North Eastern Railway	1954
Trent	Midland Railway	1968
Trent Valley Junction (Lichfield)	London and North Western Railway	1871
Trentham	North Staffordshire Railway	1964
Trentham Gardens	North Staffordshire Railway	1957
Treowen Halt	GWR	1960
Trerhyngyll and Maendy Halt	Taff Vale Railway	1951
Tresmeer	London and South Western Railway	1966
Trethomas	Brecon and Merthyr Tydfil Junction Railway	1962
Trevil Halt	London and North Western Railway	1958
Trevor	GWR	1965
Trewerry and Trerice Halt	GWR	1963
Triangle	Lancashire and Yorkshire Railway	1929
Trimdon	North Eastern Railway	1952
Trimdon Foundry	North Eastern Railway	1873
Trimingham	Norfolk and Suffolk Joint Railway	1953
Trimsaran Road	Burry Port and Gwendraeth Valley Railway	1953
Trinity	North British Railway	1925
Trodigal Halt	Campbeltown and Machrihanish Light Railway	1932
Troedyrhiew Garth	GWR	1970 reopened 1992 as Garth
Troedyrhifuwch Halt	Rhymney Railway	1916
Troed-y-Rhiw Halt	Rhymney Railway/GWR	1951
Troon Harbour	Kilmarnock and Troon Railway	1846
Troon (old)	Glasgow & South Western Railway	1892
Trouble House Halt	British Railways	1964
Troutbeck	Cockermouth, Keswick and Penrith Railway	1972
Trowell	Midland Railway	1967
Trowse (Norwich)	Great Eastern Railway	1939
Trumpers Crossing Halt	GWR	1926
Trumpington Halt	Great Eastern Railway	1922
Truro Road	West Cornwall Railway	1855
Trusham	GWR	1958
Truthall Halt	GWR	1962 reopened 2017
Tryfan Junction	North Wales Narrow Gauge Railways	1936 reopened 2011

=== Tu ===
Station (Town, unless in station name)	Rail company	Year closed
Tue Brook	London and North Western Railway	1948
Tullibardine	Caledonian Railway	1964
Tumby Woodside	GNR	1970
Tunbridge Wells West	London, Brighton and South Coast Railway	1985 New station opened by Spa Valley Rly
Tunnel Halt (later Moelwyn Halt)	Ffestiniog Railway	1939
Tunnel Junction	North Eastern Railway	1863
Tunstall	North Staffordshire Railway	1964
Turnberry	Glasgow and South Western Railway	1942
Turnchapel	London and South Western Railway	1951
Turnhouse	North British Railway	1930
Turriff	Great North of Scotland Railway	1951
Turton and Edgworth	Lancashire and Yorkshire Railway	1961
Turvey	Midland Railway	1962
Tutbury	North Staffordshire Railway	1966 reopened 1989
Tutshill Halt	GWR	1959
Tuxford Central	LD&ECR	1955
Tuxford North	GNR	1955

=== Tw ===
Station (Town, unless in station name)	Rail company	Year closed
Twechar	North British Railway	1951
Tweedmouth	North Eastern Railway	1964
Twenty	Midland and Great Northern Joint Railway	1959
Twerton-on-Avon	GWR	1917
Twizell	North Eastern Railway	1955
Twyford Abbey Halt	GWR	1911
Twywell	Midland Railway	1951

=== Ty ===
Station (Town, unless in station name)	Rail company	Year closed
Tydd	Midland and Great Northern Joint Railway	1959
Tyddyn Bridge Halt	GWR	1960
Tyddyngwyn	GWR	1883
Tylacoch Halt	Taff Vale Railway	1912
Tyldesley	London and North Western Railway	1969
Tyllwyn Halt	GWR	1962
Tylorstown	Taff Vale Railway	1964
Tylwch	Cambrian Railways	1962
Tyne Commission Quay	North Eastern Railway	1970
Tynehead	North British Railway	1969
Tynemouth B.T. Station	North Eastern Railway	1864; 1882
Tynemouth N.N.S. Station	North Eastern Railway	1882
Tynycwm Halt	GWR	1962
Tytherington	Midland Railway	1944

== U ==
Station (Town, unless in station name)	Rail company	Year closed
Uddingston East	North British Railway	1955
Uddingston West	North British Railway	1955
Udny	Great North of Scotland Railway	1965
Uffculme	GWR	1963
Uffington	GWR	1964
Uffington and Barnack	Midland Railway	1952
Ufford Bridge	GNR	1929
Ulbster	Highland Railway	1944
Ulceby Aerodrome Platform	London and North Eastern Railway	1947
Ullesthorpe	Midland Railway	1962
Ullock	Whitehaven, Cleator and Egremont Junction Railway	1931
Ulverston Road	Furness Railway	1854
Underhill Halt	Whitehaven and Furness Junction Railway	1860
Undy Halt	GWR	1964
Union Bank Farm Halt	London and North Western Railway	1951
Union Mills	Isle of Man Railway	1968
Unstone	Midland Railway	1951
Up Exe Halt	GWR	1963
Uphall	North British Railway	1956 reopened 1986
Uplawmoor -(originally Caldwell)	Glasgow, Barrhead and Kilmarnock Joint Railway	1966
Uplawmoor	Lanarkshire and Ayrshire Railway	1962
Upper Bank	Midland Railway	1950
Upper Batley	GNR	1952
Upper Boat	Cardiff Railway	1931
Upper Boat Halt	Alexandra (Newport and South Wales) Docks and Railway	1956
Upper Broughton	Midland Railway	1948
Upper Greenhill	Edinburgh and Glasgow Railway	1865
Upper Greenock	Caledonian Railway	1967
Upper Junction	North Staffordshire Railway	1864
Upper Lydbrook	Severn and Wye Railway	1929
Upper Pontnewydd	GWR	1962
Upper Soudley Halt	GWR	1958
Upper Sydenham	London, Chatham and Dover Railway	1954
Uppermill	London and North Western Railway	1917
Upperthorpe and Killamarsh	LD&ECR	1930
Uppingham	London and North Western Railway	1960
Upton and Blewbury	GWR	1962
Upton and North Elmsall	Hull and Barnsley Railway	1932
Upton-by-Chester	GWR and LMS jointly	1984
Upton Magna	Shrewsbury and Wellington Joint Railway	1964
Upton-on-Severn	Midland Railway	1961
Upwell	Great Eastern Railway	1928
Upwey	GWR	1886
Upwey (Abbotsbury Railway)	GWR	1952
Upwey Wishing Well Halt	GWR	1957
Uralite Halt	South Eastern and Chatham Railway	1961
Urquhart	Great North of Scotland Railway	1968
Ushaw Moor	NER	1951
Usk	GWR	1955
Usworth	NER	1963
Utterby Halt	GNR	1961
Uttoxeter Bridge Street	North Staffordshire Railway	1881
Uttoxeter Dove Bank	North Staffordshire Railway	1881
Uttoxeter Junction	North Staffordshire Railway	1881
Uxbridge (Belmont Road)	Metropolitan Railway	1938
Uxbridge High Street	GWR	1939
Uxbridge Road	West London Railway	1940 new station Shepherds Bush opened in 2008 on same site
Uxbridge Vine Street	GWR	1962

== V ==
Station (Town, unless in station name)	Rail company	Year closed
Valley	London and North Western Railway	1966 reopened 1982
Varteg	London and North Western Railway	1941
Velvet Hall	NER	1955
Venn Cross	GWR	1966
Ventnor	Isle of Wight Railway	1966
Ventnor West	Isle of Wight Central Railway	1952
Verney Junction	London and North Western Railway	1968
Verwood	London and South Western Railway	1964
Vicarage Crossing Halt	GWR	1931
Victoria (Monmouthshire)	GWR	1962 reopened 2007 as Ebbw Vale Parkway
Victoria Dock (Hull)	NER	1864
Victoria Park (London)	North London Railway	1943
Victoria Park and Bow	London and Blackwall Railway and Eastern Counties Railway Joint	1851
Victoria Road (Barnstaple)	GWR	1960
Vigo	NER	1869
Vowchurch	Golden Valley Railway	1941
Vulcan Halt	London and North Western Railway	1965
