= Trentham railway station =

Trentham railway station may refer to:

- Trentham railway station, New Zealand in Trentham, New Zealand
- Trentham railway station, Victoria, a former station in Trentham, Victoria, Australia
- Trentham (Staffordshire) railway station, a former station in Trentham, Staffordshire, England
- Trentham Gardens railway station, a former station serving Trentham Gardens, Staffordshire, England
