= Coed Ely railway station =

Former railway station in Wales

Coed Ely

General information
- Location: Thomastown, Rhondda Cynon Taf; Wales
- Coordinates: 51.5709°N 3.4291°W
- Grid reference: ST010867
- Platforms: 2

Other information
- Status: Demolished

History
- Original company: Great Western Railway
- Post-grouping: Great Western Railway

Key dates
- 13 July 1925: Station opened
- 9 June 1958: Station closed
Location

Coed Ely railway station served the portion of the Ely Valley around the mining communities of Thomastown and Coed-Ely in South Wales, between 1925 and 1958.

== History ==
The Ely Valley Railway (EVR) opened between Llantrisant and Tonyrefail on 2 August 1860, at first for goods trains only; it served several collieries, and was extended to Penygraig in December 1862. A passenger service between Llantrisant, Tonyrefail and Penygraig was introduced on 1 May 1901, operated by the Great Western Railway (GWR). After the EVR had been absorbed by the GWR, an additional halt was opened at Coed Ely on 13 July 1925; it was situated between Llantrisant and Tonyrefail.

The station had two platforms, each 300 feet in length. It had a building on the 'up' platform only. This was constructed from timber and asbestos. It contained waiting rooms and conveniences. The booking office was situated beside the approach footpath from the main road, at the northerly end of the 'up' platform. The 'down' platform was without any form of shelter. The station had no footbridge, passengers having to cross the line by means of a sleeper level crossing.

The station was closed when passenger services were withdrawn from the Ely Valley line from 9 June 1958.

Preceding station	Disused railways	Following station
Llantrisant; Line closed, station open	Great Western Railway; Ely Valley Railway	Tonyrefail; Line and station closed
Llantrisant; Line closed, station open	Great Western Railway; Ely Valley Extension Railway	Hendreforgan; Line and station closed
