= Thomas Morgan (Afanwyson) =

Welsh writer, historian and Baptist minister (1850–1939)

- Born: Thomas Morgan; 9 March 1850; Cwmafan, Glamorgan, Wales
- Died: 27 August 1939 (aged 89)
- Occupations: Writer, historian and Baptist minister
- Writing career
- Language: Welsh

Thomas Morgan (also known by his bardic name, Afanwyson) was a Welsh writer, historian and Baptist minister. In his work as a writer, he is remembered for his biographical works and especially his collections on Welsh place names.

== Early life and career ==
Born in Cwmafan on 9 March 1850, Morgan was the nephew of the deacon and bard David Michael (Dewi Afan) whose own poetry was characterised as "Biblical and ethical" in its nature.

Morgan began his training as a Baptist minister in 1875 at the Pontypool Baptist College, before taking up the role of minister at Caersalem chapel, Dowlais three years later. Morgan would remain at Caersalem for the next seventeen years, during which time he would become the co-editor of Y Bedyddiwr Bach in 1882 and Yr Heuwr in 1890, as well as publishing the first edition of one of his most notable works, The Place-Names of Wales in 1887.

== Later years ==
In 1895 Morgan moved to the Ainon Chapel, Cardiff where he ministered until he again moved in 1900, to Skewen where he would remained following his retirement from more than fifty years in ministry. It was during this later period that Morgan's literary work began to take precedence. At Cardiff, he worked with Thomas Powel in reorganising the Salusbury library in the University College of South Wales and Monmouthshire. He also began publishing many biographical works such as Cofiant y Parch. Nathaniel Thomas, Caerdydd in 1900, Enwogion Cymreig, 1700-1900 in 1907, Cofiant y Parch. J. Rhys Morgan, D.D. (Lleurwg) in 1908, Y Gwir Anrhydeddus D. Lloyd George, A.S. in 1910 and The Life and Work of the Rev. Thomas Thomas, D.D. in 1925. Morgan also revised and updated The Place-Names of Wales in 1887 and again in 1912, while he produced another etymological work, Glamorganshire place-names in 1901.

Morgan was also secretary of the South Wales Temperance Association for thirty years until 1920 as well as serving as president of the Welsh Baptist Union in 1927.
