= Ely Valley =

Ely Valley may refer to:

- The valley of the River Ely in South Wales surrounded by the communities of Tonyrefail, Gilfach Goch, Llantrisant, Pontyclun, Llanharan and Llanharry
- A community sports park in Tonyrefail
- Ely Valley Railway, a Welsh railway line
