= Bob Thompson (footballer, born September 1890) =

English footballer (1890–1969)

Personal information
- Full name: Robert Atkinson Thompson
- Date of birth: 5 September 1890
- Place of birth: Coundon Grange, England
- Date of death: 1 June 1969 (aged 78)
- Place of death: Ferryhill, England
- Height: 6 ft 0 in (1.83 m)
- Position: Centre forward

Senior career*
Years	Team	Apps	(Gls)
1910–1911	Wingate Albion		
1911–1913	Preston North End	17	(2)
1913–1914	Goole Town		
1914	Bristol Rovers		
1914–1915	Rotherham Town		
1919	Hartlepools United	10	(9)
1919–1920	Durham City		(25)
1920–1921	Leeds United	23	(11)
1921–1922	Ashington	17	(2)
1922–1923	Luton Town	17	(7)
1923–1924	Pontypridd		
1924–1925	Accrington Stanley	33	(17)
1925–1926	Bury	1	(0)
1926	Tranmere Rovers	1	(0)
1926–1927	Hartlepools United	4	(3)
1927	Goole Town		
1927	York City	10	(7)
- * Club domestic league appearances and goals

Robert Atkinson Thompson (5 September 1890 – 1 June 1969) was an English footballer who played as a centre forward in the Football League for Preston North End, Leeds United, Ashington, Luton Town, Accrington Stanley, Bury, Tranmere Rovers and Hartlepools United. He was a member of the inaugural Leeds United side, was the team's top scorer in their first season, and scored the team's first hat-trick. He also played non-league football for Wingate Albion, Goole Town, Bristol Rovers, Rotherham Town, Durham City, Pontypridd and York City. As a Pontypridd player, he was capped once for the Welsh League XI. Thompson was also a professional sprinter; he won the Powderhall Sprint in 1916.

== Life and career ==
Thompson was born at Black Boy Brick Yard, Coundon Grange, County Durham, in 1890, a younger son of Thomas Thompson, a mason, and his wife, Isabella. The 1911 Census finds him living with his mother in Hutton Henry, near Wingate, and working as a stone miner in a colliery.

Thompson earned himself a reputation as "a dead shot when in front of goal" while playing for Wingate Albion in the North-Eastern League during the 1910–11 season, and he joined Football League First Division club Preston North End in April 1911. He made his debut on 29 April in the last match of the season, a 2–0 win at home to Bradford City, who had just won the 1911 FA Cup Final after a replay. He began the next campaign in fine form for Preston's reserves in the newly formed Central League: in the opening fixture, at home to Burnley's reserves, he scored twice, and in the next, against Glossop, he scored four in the first half before having to leave the field with injury. Brought into the first team for the visit of Bolton Wanderers on 23 September, Thompson duly gave his team the lead, but Preston lost the match, his goalscoring form did not continue at senior level, and he scored only twice from eleven appearances during the 1911–12 season. Preston were relegated to the Second Division at the end of the season, and Thompson began the new season in the League eleven; he went five matches without scoring, and made no further appearance before leaving the club. He spent six months with Midland League club Goole Town, finished the 1913–14 season with Bristol Rovers of the Southern League, and returned to the Midland League with Rotherham Town until competitive football was abandoned for the duration of the First World War.

Thompson remained working in Sheffield during the war, and was able to keep up his involvement in sport. In 1916, he won the annual Powderhall Sprint, for which he had trained at Vickers' sports ground in the city. He also played wartime football for clubs including Sheffield United, Rotherham County and Barnsley, with whom he had one particularly eventful match. Having given a fine exhibition of centre-forward play, "distributing the ball judiciously and accurately and shooting dead on the target", during which he scored four goals including a nine-minute hat-trick, Thompson fell out of favour with his opponents and in the last minute of the match, he and Chesterfield's Ernie Gadsby were sent off for fighting. After the war he returned to the north east of England where he played for Hartlepools United and scored nine goals from ten matches in the Northern Victory League.

When competitive football resumed, Thompson helped Durham City finish fifth in the 1919–20 North-Eastern League, in which he top-scored with 25 goals, before resuming his Football League career at the age of 30 with Leeds United, newly elected to the Second Division. He was injured during their first match, a defeat away to Port Vale on 28 August 1920, and not recalled to the first team until mid-October, when he scored the first goal in a 2–0 defeat of Sheffield Wednesday. The Yorkshire Post described him as "a tall, raw-boned player" who "proved himself an energetic opportunist. He lies well up the field, ready to snap at any chance that may come along, and in this way he obtained the first goal, after the ball had struck the cross-bar from a long drive by Walton, the half back." In his next match, he scored the only goal against Hull City with a header from a corner that gave Leeds the first away win of their League career. then had a mid-season run of 22 matches in which he scored 11 goals – including Leeds United's first League hat-trick, against Notts County on 11 December, and two goals in a 3–0 win against Wolverhampton Wanderers – before losing his place to the newly arrived Tommy Howarth. The secretary stated that although the team had done well enough for a first season at Football League level, the club were aiming for a "more representative place" next season and were retaining players who could help achieve that; despite having finished as top scorer, Thompson was not among the chosen few.

Thompson signed for Ashington of the newly formed Football League Third Division North in June 1921. He scored twice in five matches before dropping to the reserves, for which he scored three goals and was promptly restored to first-team duty, for one game at centre forward and then on the right wing. He remained in and around the side until January, and then made only three more appearances in the rest of the season. Despite his inclusion on Ashington's retained list, he chose to move on to Luton Town on what he claimed would be a free transfer; the move was delayed until all parties confirmed that his contract with Ashington did indeed include a clause allowing him a free transfer. Thompson began his Luton career with six goals in his first six Third Division South matches, but his goalscoring tailed off and he made only one appearance after the Christmas period. He was given a free transfer at the end of the season, and signed for Pontypridd ahead of their unsuccessful bid for election to the Football League. Competing in the Southern League Western Division and the Welsh League, Pontypridd were a free-scoring side, and Thompson played his part. He scored four goals in a 12–1 Welsh League win in December that took the team past 100 in the first four months of the season, and was reported to have finished the season with 51. He was selected at centre forward for the Welsh League representative side to face the Irish Free State League XI in that league's first match against opponents from outside the country. The match was drawn 2–2, and Thompson did not score.

He returned to the Football League with Accrington Stanley for 1924–25. After the first match, a 2–0 win against Rotherham County in the Third Division North, the Sheffield Daily Telegraph's opinion was that "in R. Thompson, Accrington have obtained a skilful and brainy leader, his ball distribution being unusually good." After injury kept him out for a couple of matches, he scored his first goal during his fourth appearance, a 3–1 win at home to Wigan Borough. Thompson remained a regular in the side: his goalscoring in the first half of the season was infrequent, but he justified his selection with constructive use of the ball. A run of 13 goals in 12 matches in the new year took his total to 21 for the season (17 in league competition) and made him the team's top scorer by some distance. Stanley would have re-engaged him for a second season, but his contract allowed him a free transfer, and he took advantage of it to sign for First Division club Bury. He started the first match of the 1925–26 season at inside left, but that was his last appearance for Bury's first team.

Thompson played once in the Third Division North for Tranmere Rovers in September 1926, and was given a month's trial at another Northern Section club, Hartlepools United, later in the year. He played in four matches and scored in each of the first three, but was not taken on. After a trial with Goole Town, he finished his career with seven goals from ten Midland League matches for York City.

The 1939 Register finds Thompson living with his wife, Sarah, and three children in Ferryhill and working as a general labourer. He was resident in Ferryhill at the time of his death in 1969 aged 78.
