= St Michael and All Angels Church, Tongwynlais =

St Michael & All Angels
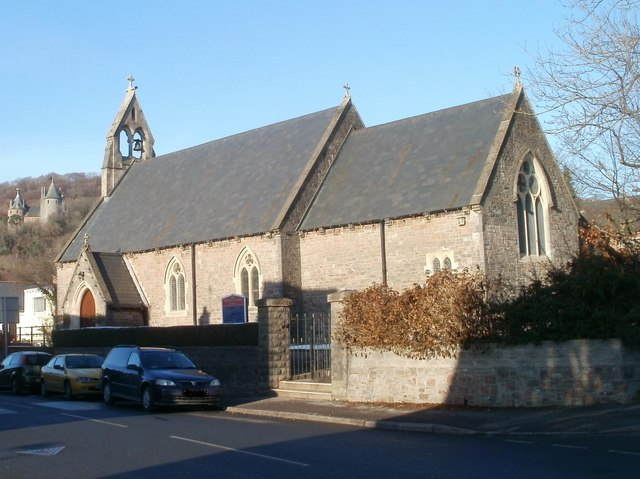
- St Michael & All Angels
- 51.5319°N 3.2508°W
- Denomination: Anglican

History
- Status: Active

Architecture
- Heritage designation: Grade II
- Designated: 10 June 1977
- Architect: John Prichard
- Architectural type: Victorian Gothic
- Groundbreaking: 1875
- Completed: February 1877

Specifications
- Materials: sandstone

Administration
- Diocese: Llandaff
- Archdeaconry: Llandaff
- Deanery: Llandaff
- Parish: Tongwynlais

Clergy
- Priest: Rev'd Sandra Birdsall

St Michael and All Angels Church is an Anglican church in the village of Tongwynlais, South Wales, serving the parish of the same name. It is a Grade II listed building.

== Early history ==
Historically belonging to the Parish of Whitchurch, Tongwynlais had no Anglican church of its own until 1850. Although the Ainon Baptist Church had existed since 1828, Anglican residents of the village were still obliged to travel nearly 2.5 miles to St Mary's Church in Whitchurch. In 1850, Henry Lewis, the squire of Greenmeadow, had his coach-house converted into a church and school, obviating the journey to Whitchurch for the first time. In 1875, he donated a site for a new purpose-built church, together with £100 towards the new building. Contributions were also received from the Llandaff Church Extension Society and the Melingriffith Tin Plate Works, and the church's founding stone was laid in 1875 with John Prichard engaged as architect. The church, constructed in red and grey sandstone, was opened in February 1877, and would function as a chapel of ease to St Mary's Church, Whitchurch for the next 44 years. Its rood screen was donated by Herbert Cory in thanksgiving for the safe return of the villagers who fought in the First World War

== Independent Parish ==
After the formation of the Church in Wales in 1920, changes were carried out to the parish structures in the area. In 1921, St Michael's was partitioned from the Parish of Whitchurch, and was placed in a new Parish of Tongwynlais. The new parish was initially in the Deanery of Caerphilly, but has since been transferred to the Deanery of Llandaff. St Michael's saw its graveyard reduced in width in 1950 owing to a road-widening scheme. In 1954, St Michael's was joined in its parish by St James' Church in Taff's Well and St Mary's Church in Nantgarw, which had both been separated from the Parish of Eglwysilan, though St Mary's in Nantgarw closed in 1983. St Michael's gained listed status in 1977.

St Michael's current priest-in-charge is Rev'd Sandra Birdsall, who is also Ministry Area Leader for the wider Garth Ministry Area which now includes the former parishes of Tongwynlais, Radyr and Pentyrch.

== St Mary & St James, Taff's Well ==
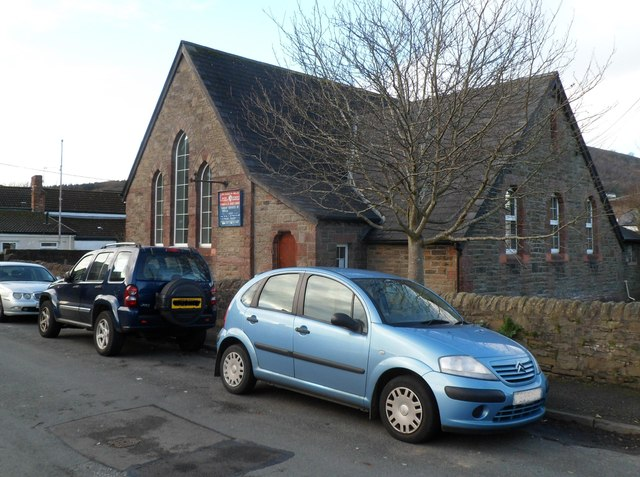
St Mary & St James

The church of St Mary and St James in Taff's Well remains St Michael's sister church. Originally dedicated solely to St James, the building was erected on Church Street in 1869, originally as a school. It continued in this role until replaced by the current village school in 1879 and subsequently saw conversion into a church. It has a war memorial commemorating local people lost during the two world wars and the Troubles in Northern Ireland. After St Mary's in Nantgarw closed in 1983, St James' amended its dedication to St Mary and St James in commemoration.
