= Trentham Park branch line =

Short railway branch line in Staffordshire, England

The Trentham Park branch line was a 1 1/4-mile (2.0 km) railway line that ran through the Trentham area of Stoke-on-Trent. It was last branch line to be built by the North Staffordshire Railway. Intended to route traffic to Trentham Gardens, the branch was authorised by the North Staffordshire Railway Act 1907 (7 Edw. 7. c. cxlvii) and opened on 1 April 1910. It left the main line at Trentham Junction where there was a platform connected by a short path to Trentham, although Trentham Junction itself never appeared as a separate station in the timetable.

== Abortive extension ==
By the time of its opening, local traffic was already being carried by road. As a result, the only intermediate station, Hanford Road Halt, was closed after just three years.

However, a plan to extend the line to Pool Dam, Newcastle-under-Lyme, to form a four mile long route around the growing suburbs was approved by the North Staffordshire Railway (Trentham, Newcastle-under-Lyme, and Silverdale Light Railway) Order 1914. In preparation for this a steel bridge was constructed in September 1914 over London Road (now part of the A34) just beyond Trentham Park, along with a brick culvert to protect a water main from the planned embankment, but work on the extension was halted by World War I, and officially abandoned by the North Staffordshire Railway Act 1921 (11 & 12 Geo. 5. c. cxvii). The bridge remained as a bridge to nowhere until 1940, when it was dismantled for scrap for the World War II effort.

== World War II ==
During the war, the branch was at its busiest due to the Bankers' Clearing House having temporarily relocated the national cheque clearing house to the ballroom at the Trentham Estate. Numerous unpublicised passenger trains ran to serve it, along with a daily freight working.

== Closure ==
After the war the line continued to be used for excursion trains from the Midlands, the last one running from Birmingham on 1 October 1957.
