= Penygraig railway station =

Disused railway station in Penygraig, Rhondda Cynon Taf

Penygraig

General information
- Location: Penygraig, Glamorgan; Wales
- Coordinates: 51.6109°N 3.4478°W
- Grid reference: SS998912
- Platforms: 2

Other information
- Status: Disused

History
- Original company: Great Western Railway
- Pre-grouping: Great Western Railway
- Post-grouping: Great Western Railway

Key dates
- 1 May 1901: Opened
- 9 June 1958: Closed
Location

Penygraig railway station served the village of Penygraig, in the historical county of Glamorgan, Wales, from 1901 to 1958 on the Ely Valley Railway.

== History ==
The station was opened on 1 May 1901 by the Great Western Railway. It was known as Penygraig and Tonypandy in the handbook of stations from 12 July 1911 until 13 July 1925. It closed on 9 June 1958.

Preceding station	Disused railways	Following station
Terminus	Great Western Railway; Ely Valley Railway	Tonyrefail; Line and station closed
