= Glan y Llyn railway station =

Disused railway station in Wales

Glan-y-Llyn

General information
- Location: Taffs Well, Rhondda Cynon Taf; Wales
- Coordinates: 51.55°N 3.27°W
- Grid reference: ST120841
- Platforms: 2 (later 1)

Other information
- Status: Disused

History
- Original company: Cardiff Railway
- Post-grouping: Great Western Railway

Key dates
- 1 March 1911: opened
- 20 July 1931: closed
Location

Glan-y-Llyn railway station is a disused railway station in Rhondda Cynon Taf, South Wales.

== History ==
The station was opened in 1911 by the Cardiff Railway. It lay near to the junction with the Taff Vale Railway, at Taffs Well station. It served Glan-y-Llyn, a district of Taffs Well. Glan-y-Llyn was a substantial structure, comprising a brick station building, two platforms linked by a footbridge, a signal box (which opened in 1909), and a large goods shed which lay to the south of the passenger facilities.

The Great Western Railway, in response to the slim profits of the line, closed the signal box in 1927, and the 'down' platform was taken out of use in 1928. The section of track on which the station lay was later reopened as a freight-only link, providing access to Nantgarw Colliery, surviving until 1988.

== After Closure ==
The station building still stands and is now in use as a private residence. The structure has been considerably altered.

Preceding station	Disused railways	Following station
Tongwynlais; Line and station closed	Great Western Railway; Cardiff Railway	Nantgarw (Low Level) Halt; Line and station closed
