= Tunnel Junction railway station =

Short-lived railway station in Coundon Grange, County Durham

Tunnel Junction

General information
- Location: Coundon Grange, County Palatine of Durham; England
- Coordinates: 54.6423°N 1.6497°W
- Grid reference: NZ227275

Other information
- Status: Disused

History
- Original company: North Eastern Railway
- Pre-grouping: North Eastern Railway

Key dates
- 13 October 1858: Opened
- 1 August 1863: Closed
Location

Tunnel Junction railway station co-served the village of Coundon Grange, in the historic county of County Palatine of Durham, England, from 1858 to 1863 on the Shildon branch of the Stockton and Darlington Railway.

== History ==
The station was opened on 13 October 1858 by the North Eastern Railway. It appeared in the handbook of stations as Tunnel Branch Junction. It was a short-lived station, only being open for under five years before closing on 1 August 1863.

| Preceding station | Disused railways | Following station |
|---|---|---|
| Shildon; Line closed, station open | North Eastern Railway; Shildon branch | Terminus |
