= Upper Boat Halt railway station =

Former railway station in Wales

Upper Boat Halt

General information
- Location: Upper Boat, Rhondda Cynon Taf; Wales
- Coordinates: 51.5787°N 3.2889°W
- Grid reference: ST108875

Other information
- Status: Disused

History
- Original company: Pontypridd, Caerphilly and Newport Railway
- Post-grouping: Great Western Railway

Key dates
- 1 September 1904: opens as Upper Boat
- 1 July 1924: renamed Upper Boat Halt
- 17 September 1956: closed
Location

Upper Boat Halt railway station served the village of Upper Boat in South Wales until the 1950s.

== History and description ==
All the halts built on the line were very basic affairs, most being without platforms, though unlike the others, Upper Boat had a footbridge to allow passengers to reach the 'down' platform.

Upper Boat was given the 'halt' suffix in 1924 after the GWR took control of the line in order to avoid confusion with Upper Boat railway station on the former Cardiff Railway. This, in contrast, was a substantial station with a large building.

It did not take long for the GWR to curtail what it saw as the unnecessarily dense network of railways in the region, which prior to the Railways Act 1921 had all been in competition with each other. In 1924, Upper Boat Halt was listed as a request stop, and again in 1926– and then only on certain services.

The halt closed in 1956 when traffic on the line was withdrawn.

Preceding station	Disused railways	Following station
Dynea Halt; Line & station closed	Great Western Railway; Pontypridd, Caerphilly & Newport Railway	Groeswen Halt; Line & station closed
