= Groeswen Halt railway station =

Former railway station in Wales

Groeswen Halt

General information
- Location: Caerphilly; Wales
- Coordinates: 51.573096°N 3.2784072°W
- Grid reference: ST115868

Other information
- Status: Disused

History
- Original company: Pontypridd, Caerphilly and Newport Railway
- Post-grouping: Great Western Railway

Key dates
- 1 September 1904: opens as Groeswen
- 1 July 1924: renamed Groeswen Halt
- 17 September 1956: closed

Groeswen Halt railway station served the hamlet of Groeswen in Caerphilly, South Wales.

== History and description ==
Opened as 'Groeswen', the station was similar in construction to the other halts on the line. It had ground-level platforms which were without shelters, and had only wooden fenced enclosures, the gates of which would be unlocked by the train guard. Despite scrimping on passenger facilities, the Company provided Groeswen with a signal box and a large manager's house for the tramway (industrial) which led from Groeswen Colliery to a siding which ran through the 'down' platform. This was installed in 1899 to connect with the already-existing colliery sidings. In 1907, a down refuge siding was added, and lasted until 1949, though the crossover remained until 1952.

== Closure and after ==
Like the other stations on the branch, Groeswen closed in 1956. In the same year, the Groeswen signal box was demolished. The remains of the trackbed were cleared in 1988. The site of the halt is now a picnic area, though the stone retaining wall of the signal box remains.

Preceding station	Disused railways	Following station
Upper Boat Halt; Line & station closed	Great Western Railway; Pontypridd, Caerphilly & Newport Railway	Nantgarw (High Level) Halt; Line & station closed
