= Rhydyfelin (Low Level) Halt railway station =

Former railway station in Wales

Rhydyfelin (Low Level) Halt

General information
- Location: Rhydyfelin, Rhondda Cynon Taf; Wales
- Coordinates: 51.58334°N 3.31170°W
- Grid reference: ST091880
- Platforms: 1

Other information
- Status: Disused

History
- Original company: Cardiff Railway
- Post-grouping: Great Western Railway

Key dates
- 1 March 1911: opens as Rhydyfelin Halt
- 1 July 1924: renamed Rhydyfelin Low Level Halt
- 20 July 1931: closes
Location

Rhydyfelin Low Level Halt railway station was a small halt in the county borough of Rhondda Cynon Taf, South Wales. It opened in 1911 and closed in 1931.

== History & Description ==
The halt was the terminus of the Cardiff Railway. Although the Rhydyfelin viaduct lay just beyond the station and connected the Cardiff Railway to the Taff Vale Railway lines at Treforest, the TVR was successful in preventing the instigation of regular trains over the viaduct.

The halt was very basic. At first, it consisted of a signal-cabin which had an adjoining fenced enclosure (at ground-level) where passengers waited. The gate was opened by the guard when the train arrived.

In 1924, the Great Western Railway amended the station's name to Rhydyfelin Low Level Halt to avoid confusion with the similarly named halt on the neighboring Pontypridd, Caerphilly and Newport line, which became Rhydyfelin High Level Halt at the same time.

In 1928, the GWR added a passing-loop and a proper platform. However, the halt closed in 1931 when the line was shut down.

== Remains ==
The site of the halt is no longer easily traceable. Like many of the stations on the Cardiff Railway, it is now covered by the A470 trunk road.

Preceding station	Disused railways	Following station
Upper Boat; Line and station closed	Great Western Railway; Cardiff Railway	Treforest Low Level; Line closed, station open
