= Tongwynlais =

Village and community in Cardiff, Wales

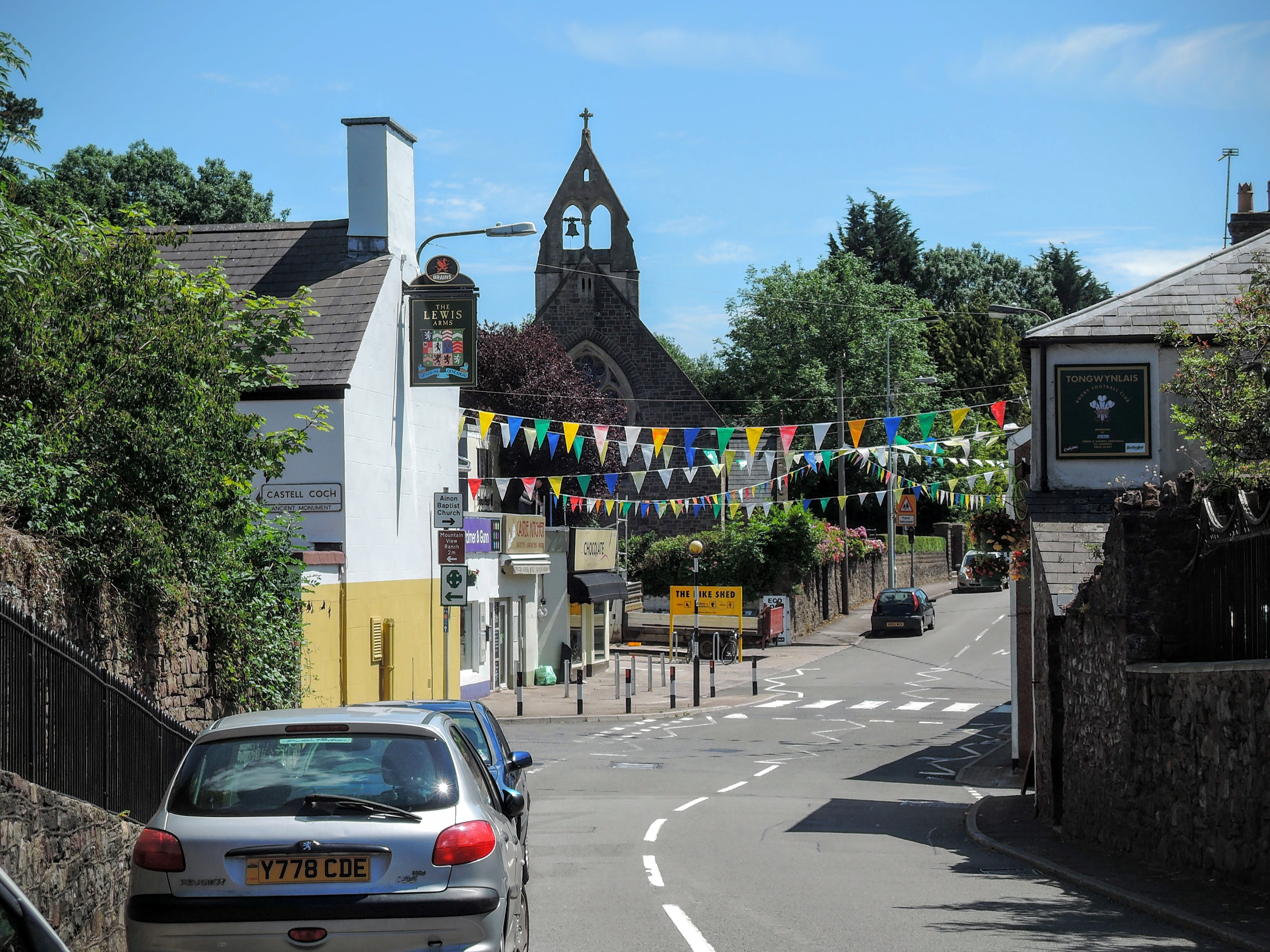
- Merthyr Road, with St Michael and All Angels Church in the background.

- Location within Cardiff
- Population: 1,871
- OS grid reference: ST136819
- Principal area: Cardiff
- Preserved county: South Glamorgan
- Country: Wales
- Sovereign state: United Kingdom
- Post town: CARDIFF
- Postcode district: CF15
- Dialling code: 029
- Police: South Wales
- Fire: South Wales
- Ambulance: Welsh
- UK Parliament: Cardiff North
- Senedd Cymru – Welsh Parliament: Cardiff North
- Website: https://www.tongwynlaiscommunitycouncil.gov.wales/
- List of places UK Wales Cardiff 51.5307°N 3.2490°W Map of the community

Tongwynlais (Welsh pronunciation: [tɔŋgˈwɪnlai̯s]) is a village and community in the north of Cardiff, Wales, north of the M4 motorway in the Taff Valley. It is notable as the location of the hillside landmark, Castell Coch. The population as of the 2011 census was 1,871.

== Toponymy ==
The name Tongwynlais is believed to be derived from the word ton meaning 'ley land', i.e. 'pasture, grassland or unploughed land'; and Gwynlais, the name of the stream that runs through the village, Nant Gwynlais, thus "pasture by the Gwynlais". Gwynlais means pure voice in Welsh. (See also Tonna.)

== Overview ==
Tongwynlais lies in the River Taff Valley. Its population was 1946 at the 2001 census.

Tongwynlais is located near Junction 32 of the M4 motorway, east of Bridgend and west of Newport and the A470 trunk road. It is situated 5 miles (8 km) north of Cardiff city centre and 7 miles (11 km) south of Pontypridd. The surrounding towns and villages are Pentyrch and Radyr to the west, Taff's Well and Caerphilly to the north, and Rhiwbina and Whitchurch to the south. Tongwynlais became part of Cardiff in 1974 when Cardiff was expanded northwestwards.

Many consider Tongwynlais as the entrance to the South Wales Valleys from Cardiff, with its famous landmark, Castell Coch, on a hillside. The main route to the Valleys, and beyond to Mid Wales, the A470, runs alongside the village. To the north of the village is Fforest Fawr, a forest of about 100 hectares (250 acres) run by Natural Resources Wales. Tongwynlais is separated from the rest of Cardiff by the M4 and the A470 to the south and west and hills and forestry to the east. Tongwynlais is considered to be part of the Cardiff North Rural Area.

Tongwynlais is home to a pub, several shops, a football club, a rugby club, a 9-hole golf course, and Tongwynlais Library.

The Taff Trail cycle route passes through the village, and it is a popular resting point between sections.

The Cardiff Railway once ran through Tongwynlais. It passed through a tunnel just beneath Castell Coch. Tongwynlais railway station opened in 1911 and closed in 1931. The nearest station on the Coryton Line is Coryton. Radyr railway station is also nearby.

== Government ==
Senedd Cymru – Welsh Parliament
Tongwynlais is in the Caerdydd Ffynnon Taf constituency for the Senedd.

Houses of Parliament
Cardiff North is currently represented by Anna McMorrin MP, a member of the Labour Party.

Local Government - City Council
Tongwynlais is part of the Whitchurch & Tongwynlais electoral ward of Cardiff City Council and is represented by 4 councillors all of the Welsh Labour Party. In addition, Tongwynlais is also governed by a community council.

Local Government - Community Council
There are nine seats on the community council, which is funded by a precept on council tax bills in Tongwynlais and supports a number of local services. Elections are held every five years. The last election was held at the same time as the 2022 Cardiff Council election. The next election is due to be held in May 2027.

== Castell Coch ==
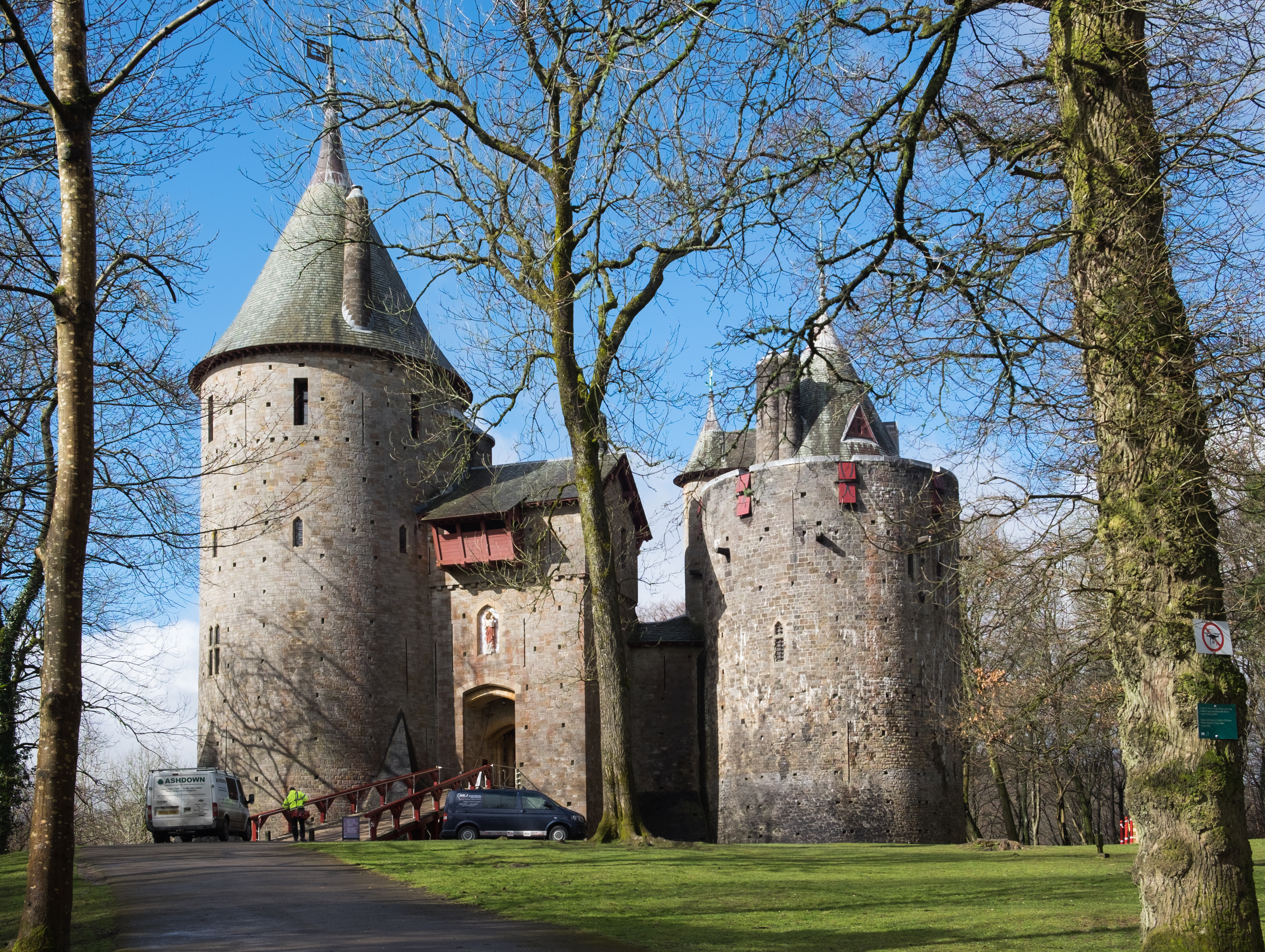
Castell Coch in 2018

Tongwynlais' most notable building is the Victorian era folly castle called Castell Coch (Red Castle) which is open to the public. It was built on top of the ruins of a 13th-century castle thought to have belonged to Ifor Bach, a local Welsh ruler. It was rebuilt and transformed in the late 1870s by William Burges for the 3rd Marquess of Bute.

== Places of worship ==
=== St Michael and All Angels ===
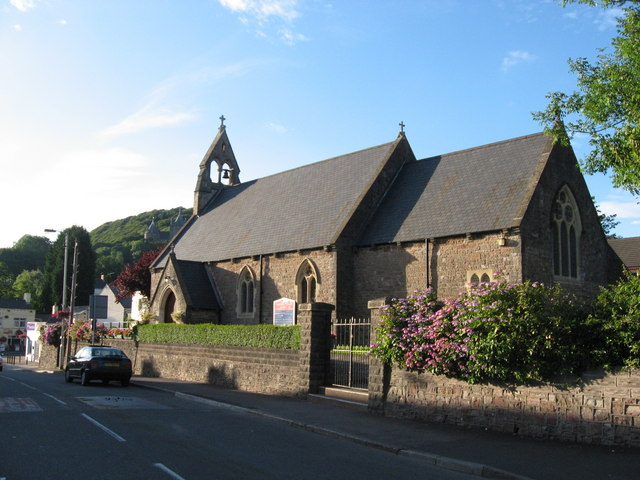
|St Michael and All Angels Church, Tongwynlais

St Michael and All Angels Church is the parish church of Tongwynlais. Designed by the architect John Prichard in the Victorian Gothic style, the church was built between 1875 and 1877 on land donated by Colonel Henry Lewis of Greenmeadow. Constructed of red and grey sandstone, it opened in February 1877 and became a Grade II listed building in 1977.

=== Ainon Baptist Church ===
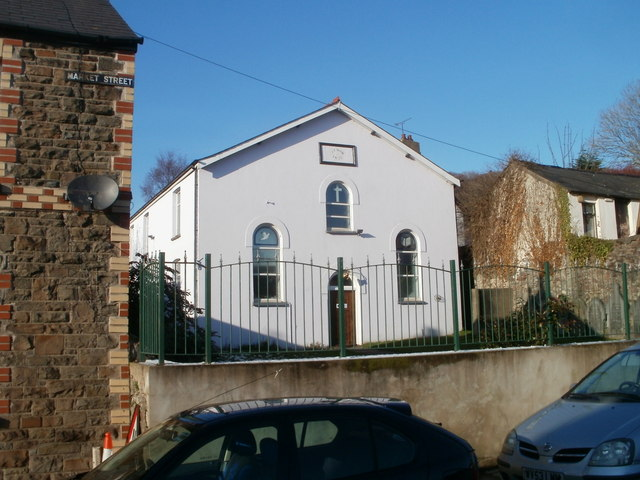
Ainon Baptist Church, Tongwynlais.

Ainon Baptist Church is a Baptist chapel on Market Street in Tongwynlais. The preacher Christmas Evans was based at Tonyfelin Chapel in Caerphilly between 1826 and 1828, during which time he preached at the Lewis Arms public house in the village. Inspired by his ministry, Ainon Baptist Church was established in 1828. The present chapel building was constructed in 1832 and is the oldest church building in Tongwynlais. The interior of the church was renovated and modernised in 2003.

=== St Garabed Armenian Church ===
St Garabed Armenian Church occupies the former Bethesda United Reformed Church building and serves the Armenian community in South Wales

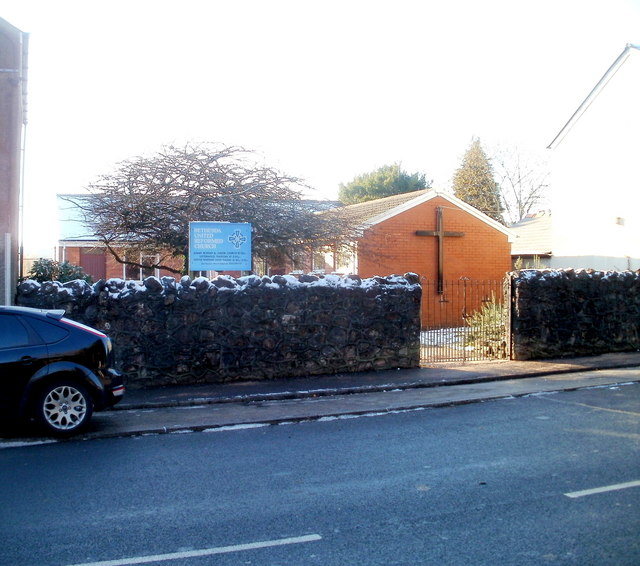
St Garabed Armenian Church, Tongwynlais.

There were once two other Nonconformist chapels in the village, both of which have since closed and been converted into private residences.

== History ==
=== Bennett's Garage ===
Bennett's Garage was a petrol filling station and vehicle repair business located on Merthyr Road in Tongwynlais. Established in 1942 on the site of a former smithy, it served motorists and local residents for much of the twentieth century.

The garage was operated by the Bennett family and was a well-known local business during the 1950s, 1960s and 1970s. An advertisement published in connection with the 1969 Investiture of the Prince of Wales referred to the business as L. J. & C. Bennett.

The petrol station later closed, and the site was subsequently redeveloped for other uses.

=== Railway ===
The Cardiff Railway ran through Tongwynlais in the early 20th century, passing beneath Castell Coch via a tunnel and following the River Taff valley. The line was constructed to link the coalfields of the South Wales Valleys with Cardiff Docks.

Tongwynlais railway station was opened by the Cardiff Railway on 1 March 1911. The station had two platforms connected by a footbridge and a substantial station building on the up platform. It served both passengers and goods traffic.

The station closed on 20 July 1931 following the decline in use of the line, and it was never reopened when the route briefly returned to service after nationalisation. Little trace of the station remains today, as the site was later removed during construction of the A470 road.

=== Greenmeadow and the Lewis family ===
Greenmeadow is a historic house near Tongwynlais in the northern part of Cardiff, associated with the Lewis family of Van, a prominent landed gentry family in Glamorgan. The estate forms part of a wider pattern of country houses owned by the family across South Wales, including The Van near Caerphilly.

The Lewis family were among the leading landowning families in the region from the early modern period onwards, holding extensive estates and serving in public office, including the role of High Sheriff of Glamorgan on multiple occasions.

Greenmeadow became associated with the family in the 19th century and is recorded as having been occupied by members of the Lewis family during this period. The house was later the residence of Colonel Henry Lewis, who maintained the estate and its grounds in the late 19th and early 20th centuries.

The property is noted in contemporary accounts for its interior collection of artworks, antiques, and curios gathered from Britain and abroad. It also became associated with wider social and political connections, including visits by prominent public figures of the period.

Following the decline of large landed estates in the 20th century, Greenmeadow passed out of direct family use and the wider Lewis estate holdings in the area were gradually reduced through sale and redevelopment

=== Industrial period ===
During the 19th century, the wider Taff Valley experienced significant industrial development associated with the growth of coal mining, iron production, and transport infrastructure in South Wales. Although Tongwynlais itself did not develop as a major industrial centre, its location on the northern edge of Cardiff meant it was influenced by these wider regional changes.

The construction of transport routes through the valley, including the Glamorganshire Canal and later railway developments in the surrounding area, improved connections between the South Wales Valleys and the port of Cardiff. These routes facilitated the movement of raw materials and goods, contributing to the economic integration of the region.

Quarrying activity took place in the surrounding limestone hills, providing building stone for local and regional use. This activity was generally small-scale compared with the large coal and iron industries elsewhere in South Wales, but formed part of the mixed rural-industrial economy of the Cardiff hinterland.

By the late 19th and early 20th centuries, industrial expansion in nearby areas such as Cardiff and the Rhondda Valleys led to increased residential development in surrounding villages. Tongwynlais increasingly functioned as a residential settlement connected to Cardiff rather than as an industrial centre in its own right.

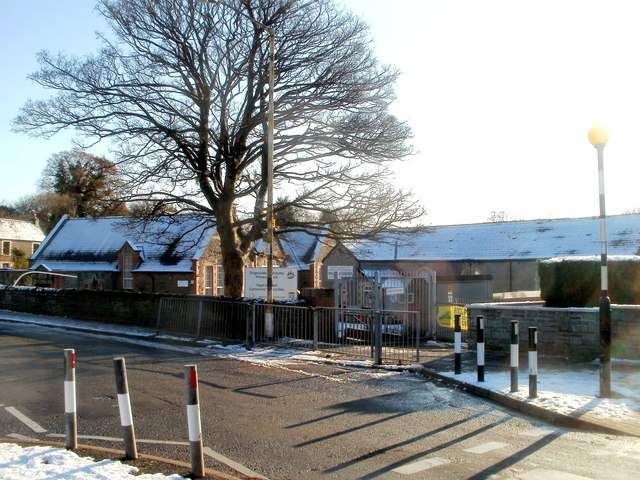
Tongwynlais Community Primary School

== Education ==
Tongwynlais Primary School is a community primary school located on Merthyr Road in Tongwynlais, Cardiff. The school provides co-educational education for pupils aged 3 to 11 and serves the local community.

The school opened in 1908 and is housed in a traditional stone building. It has been extended and modernised over time while retaining its original structure.

The school continues to serve pupils from Tongwynlais and the surrounding area as part of the Cardiff local authority education system.

== Music ==
The band RocketGoldStar wrote a song about the village, recording it on their 1996 album. They recorded it for a BBC Radio 1 Maida Vale Session. Tongwynlais Brass Band has been in existence since the 19th century and continues to compete in national competitions as well as performing concerts. Castell Coch Choral Society also does a lot of charitable work and has recently performed in the Czech Republic.

The Welsh glam metal band Tigertailz named a song on Disc 1 of their Thrill Pistol album "Tongwynlais Fly".

== In popular culture ==
Tongwynlais is closely associated with Castell Coch, which has been used as a filming location for numerous television programmes and films. The castle appeared in the BBC science-fiction series Doctor Who, including the episode "Nightmare in Silver" (2013), where it was used as "Natty Longshoe's Comical Castle". Filming also took place in nearby Fforest Fawr for the episode "Robot of Sherwood" (2014).

Castell Coch has also featured in the television series The Worst Witch and Merlin, contributing to its reputation as one of Wales's most recognisable fantasy and historical filming locations.

== Geology ==
The geology of the Tongwynlais area is dominated by Carboniferous Limestone, which forms part of the wider bedrock geology of the northern Cardiff region within the South Wales Basin. These limestone deposits were formed during the Carboniferous period in a warm, shallow marine environment.

The surrounding landscape reflects the influence of this bedrock, with steep valley sides and exposed rock formations characteristic of the Taff Valley. The River Taff and its tributaries have played a significant role in shaping the local topography through long-term erosion and valley formation.

Superficial deposits in the valley floor consist mainly of alluvium and glacial or post-glacial sediments associated with the River Taff system.

Evidence of small-scale quarrying in the surrounding area reflects the local use of Carboniferous Limestone for building materials. Disused quarries remain visible within the wider landscape.

== Images ==
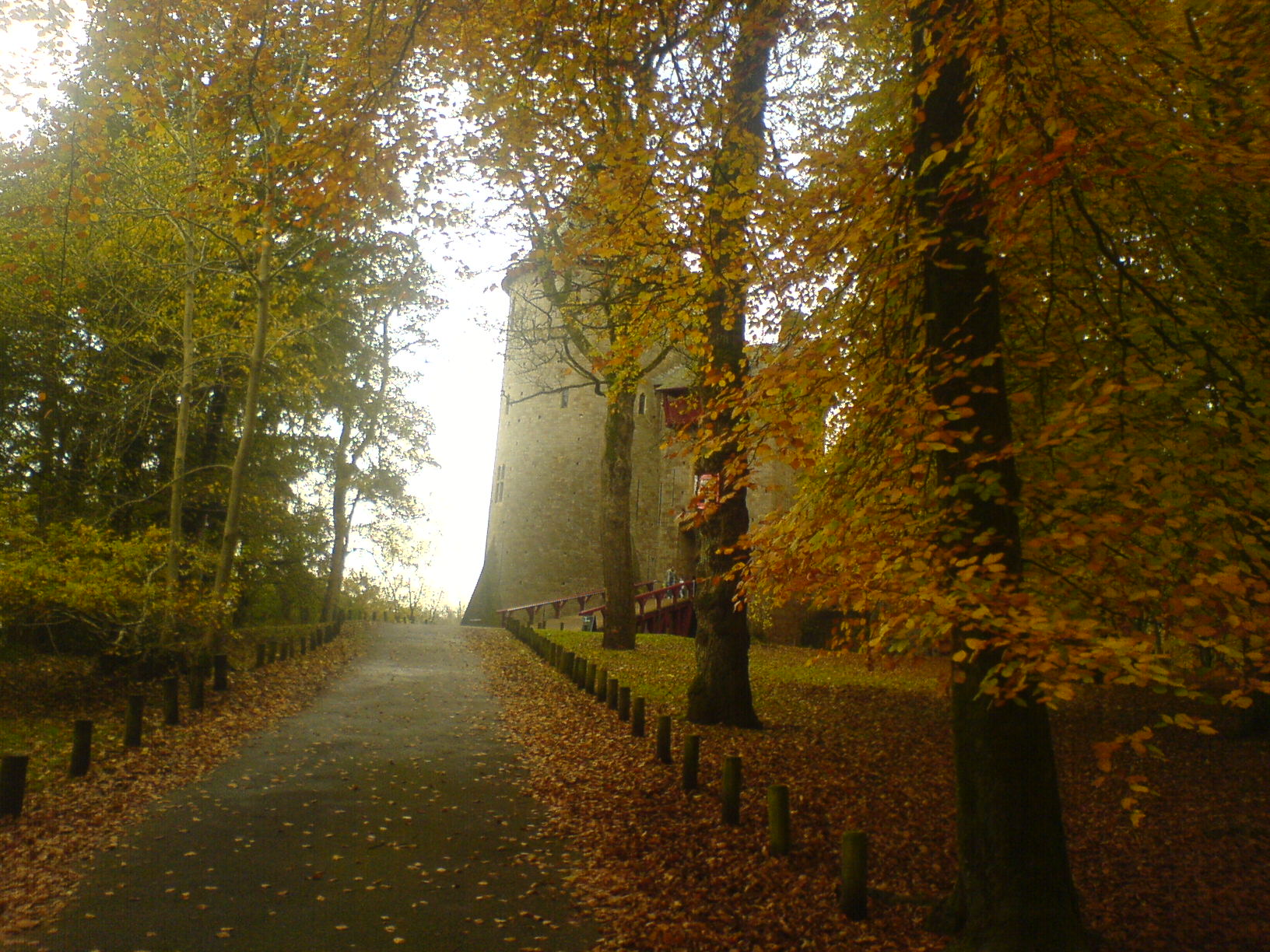
Castell Coch in autumn.
