= Glyntaff Halt railway station =

Formerrailway station in Wales

Glyntaff Halt

General information
- Location: Glyntaff, Rhondda Cynon Taf; Wales
- Coordinates: 51.5976°N 3.3244°W
- Grid reference: ST084896
- Platforms: 2

Other information
- Status: Disused

History
- Original company: Pontypridd, Caerphilly and Newport Railway
- Post-grouping: Great Western Railway

Key dates
- 1 September 1904: opens as Glyntaff
- 1 July 1924: renamed Glyntaff Halt
- 5 May 1930: closes
Location

Glyntaff Halt was a small, short-lived railway halt which served the village of Glyntaff in South Wales.

== History & Description ==
Although only a small station, Glyntaff was, at the time of opening, the location of the line's engine shed. This closed in September 1922. It was also the site of the railmotor shed, which was opened in 1906 and closed in 1930, though the siding remained until 1947. One of the sidings served Pentrebach Quarry, under an agreement of 1903. The quarry changed hands in 1925 and the agreement was terminated.

The station initially had ground-level platforms, but these were soon modified to raised ones. It is possible that this was done in 1906, when similar alterations were carried out at Pontypridd Tram Road Halt. The station had a single long building.

In 1924, the station was renamed Glyntaff Halt by the Great Western Railway, which had taken over the line during the Grouping.

Glyntaff Halt closed some years before the other stations on the line, ceasing to operate in 1930.

Preceding station	Disused railways	Following station
Pontypridd Tram Road; Line and station closed	Great Western Railway; Pontyprid, Caerphilly & Newport Railway	Treforest Halt; Line and station closed
