= Dynea Halt railway station =

Former railway station in Wales

Dynea Halt

General information
- Location: Rhydyfelin, Rhondda Cynon Taf; Wales
- Coordinates: 51.5872°N 3.3029°W
- Grid reference: ST098883

Other information
- Status: Disused

History
- Original company: Pontypridd, Caerphilly and Newport Railway
- Post-grouping: Great Western Railway

Key dates
- 1 September 1904: opens as Dynea
- 1 July 1924: renamed Dynea Halt
- 17 September 1956: closed
Location

Dynea Halt was a railway station in Rhydyfelin near Pontypridd, Wales. It was a small halt on the Pontypridd, Caerphilly and Newport Railway, and closed in 1956.

== History and description ==
Like the other halts on the line, Dynea opened in 1904 to cater for the local railmotor passenger services. In October 1908, the halt was badly damaged in a flood. An avalanche of water and rubble swept through the area before over-spilling into the Glamorganshire Canal. In 1924, the suffix 'halt' was added by the GWR.

Dynea had ground-level platforms with partially-open wooden shelters inside wooden enclosures. The gates of these would be unlocked when a train arrived. The shelters do not appear in later photographs, probably removed at some date before the 1950s. In 1931, the GWR added a down siding some 300 yards from Dynea Halt, controlled by the Dynea signal box. At some later date, a ground frame was added to control it, but this development was short-lived, and the siding was gone by 1943.

Dynea closed in 1956, along with all the remaining halts on the line.

== After closure ==
There are no traces remaining of the halt. The site is now part of the Nantgarw-Treforest cycle track.

Preceding station	Disused railways	Following station
Rhydyfelin (High Level) Halt; Line & station closed	Great Western Railway; Pontypridd, Caerphilly & Newport Railway	Upper Boat Halt; Line & station closed
