= Nantgarw (High Level) Halt railway station =

Former railway station in Wales

Nantgarw (High Level) Halt

General information
- Location: Nantgarw, Rhondda Cynon Taf; Wales
- Coordinates: 51.5642°N 3.2648°W
- Grid reference: ST124858

Other information
- Status: Disused

History
- Original company: Pontypridd, Caerphilly and Newport Railway
- Post-grouping: Great Western Railway

Key dates
- 1 September 1904: opens as Nantgarw Halt
- 1 July 1924: renamed Nantgarw (High Level) Halt
- 17 September 1956: closed
Location

Nantgarw (High Level) Halt railway station was a halt on the disused Pontypridd, Caerphilly & Newport Railway.

== History and description ==
The halt opened in 1904. It was without raised platforms, having only ground-level wooden shelters which were sealed off from the tracks by wooden enclosures which were unlocked by the conductor when a train arrived. In 1924, it was renamed to avoid confusion with the similarly named halt on the former Cardiff Railway, Nantgarw (Low Level) Halt, which closed in 1931.

The signs at Nantgarw (High Level) Halt read simply 'Nantgarw' in its last years. The halt closed in 1956. Its location is no longer easily identifiable. The site is now part of the Nantgarw-Treforest cycle-way.

Preceding station	Disused railways	Following station
Groeswen Halt; Line & station closed	Great Western Railway; Pontypridd, Caerphilly & Newport Railway	Caerphilly; Line closed, station open
