= Rhydyfelin (High Level) Halt railway station =

Former railway station in Wales

Rhydyfelin High Level Halt

General information
- Location: Rhydyfelin, Rhondda Cynon Taf; Wales
- Coordinates: 51.5887°N 3.3109°W
- Grid reference: ST093886
- Platforms: 2

Other information
- Status: Disused

History
- Original company: Pontypridd, Caerphilly and Newport Railway
- Post-grouping: Great Western Railway

Key dates
- 1 September 1904: opens as Rhydyfelin Halt
- 1922: renamed Rhydyfelin (High Level) Halt
- 14 May 1928: re-sited
- 8 June 1953: closed
Location

Rhydyfelin (High Level) Halt railway station once served the village of Rhydyfelin in South Wales.

== History ==
The station opened in 1904 on the Pontypridd, Caerphilly and Newport Railway to cater to the new railmotor service on the line. As opened, it consisted of a single ground-level wooden platform made of old sleepers and a level crossing, also at ground-level. In 1922, the station was renamed to avoid confusion with the similarly named halt on the former Cardiff Railway, which subsequently became Rhydyfelin (Low Level) Halt. In 1928, the original halt was closed and a new one was built at 51.5886°N 3.3107°W. This had two wooden platforms and a corrugated tin shelter.

== Closure ==
The halt closed in 1953 and no trace of it remains. The trackbed is now part of the Treforest-Nantgarw cycleway.

Preceding station	Disused railways	Following station
Treforest Halt; Line & station closed	Great Western Railway; Pontypridd, Caerphilly & Newport Railway	Dynea Halt; Line & station closed
