= Tonyrefail railway station =

Disused railway station in Tonyrefail, Rhondda Cynon Taf

Tonyrefail

General information
- Location: Tonyrefail, Glamorgan; Wales
- Coordinates: 51.5838°N 3.4304°W
- Grid reference: ST009881
- Platforms: 2

Other information
- Status: Disused

History
- Original company: Great Western Railway
- Pre-grouping: Great Western Railway
- Post-grouping: Great Western Railway

Key dates
- 1 May 1901: Opened
- 9 June 1958: Closed
Location

Tonyrefail railway station served the village of Tonyrefail, in the historical county of Glamorgan, Wales, from 1901 to 1958 on the Ely Valley Railway.

== History ==
The station was opened on 1 May 1901 by the Great Western Railway. It closed on 9 June 1958.

Preceding station	Historical railways	Following station
Penygraig; Line and station closed	Great Western Railway; Ely Valley Railway	Coed Ely; Line and station closed
