= Nantgarw (Low Level) Halt railway station =

Former railway station in Wales

Nantgarw (Low Level) Halt

General information
- Location: Taffs Well, Rhondda Cynon Taf; Wales
- Coordinates: 51.5614°N 3.2746°W
- Grid reference: ST118854
- Platforms: 2 (later 1)

Other information
- Status: Disused

History
- Original company: Cardiff Railway
- Post-grouping: Great Western Railway

Key dates
- 1 March 1911: opens as Nantgarw Halt
- 1 July 1924: renamed Nantgarw (Low Level) Halt
- 20 July 1931: closed
Location

Nantgarw (Low Level) Halt railway station was a halt on the now-disused Cardiff Railway.

== History ==
The halt opened along with the line in 1911. It was named Nantgarw Halt, even though there was already a halt with this name on the Pontypridd, Caerphilly and Newport Railway, which had opened in 1904.

After the Great Western Railway took over the line in the 1920s, the halt was renamed Nantgarw (Low Level) Halt to distinguish it from the PC&NR station in 1924. An additional platform was opened on the down side of the line in 1928, and a passing loop was added at the same time. Despite these modifications, the halt closed to all traffic in 1931.

== After closure ==
The footpaths and one nameboard remained in 1957, but these traces of the halt are long gone. The line, slightly modified to serve Nantgarw Colliery lasted in use until the 1980s. The whole site of the station (and much else) is now covered by a business park.

Preceding station	Disused railways	Following station
Glan-y-Llyn; Line and station closed	Great Western Railway; Cardiff Railway	Upper Boat; Line and station closed
