= Trefeinon railway station =

Former railway station in Powys, Wales

Trefeinon

General information
- Location: South of Trefeca, Powys; Wales
- Coordinates: 51.9668°N 3.2605°W
- Grid reference: SO134306
- Platforms: 2

Other information
- Status: Disused

History
- Original company: Mid Wales Railway
- Pre-grouping: Cambrian Railways
- Post-grouping: Great Western Railway

Key dates
- October 1864: opened
- 1962: Closed
Location

Trefeinon railway station was a station to the south of Trefeca, Powys, Wales. The station was closed in 1962. The station had a signal box.

Preceding station	Disused railways	Following station
Talgarth; Line and station closed	Cambrian Railways; Mid Wales Railway	Llangorse Lake Halt; Line and station closed
