= Thornton railway station (Stag and Castle Inn) =

Disused railway station in Thornton, Leicestershire

Coordinates: 52.6675°N 1.3237°W

Thornton

General information
- Location: Thornton, Leicestershire; England

Other information
- Status: Disused

History
- Original company: Leicester and Swannington Railway
- Pre-grouping: Leicester and Swannington Railway

Key dates
- 18 July 1832: Opened as Stag and Castle Inn
- 1841: Name changed to Thornton
- 1 January 1842: Closed

Thornton railway station served the village of Thornton, Leicestershire, England, from 1832 to 1842 on the Leicester and Swannington Railway.

== History ==
The station was opened as Stag and Castle Inn on 18 July 1832 by the Leicester and Swannington Railway. Its name was changed to Thornton in 1841. It closed on 1 January 1842.

Preceding station	Historical railways	Following station
Merry Lees; Line and station closed	Leicester and Swannington Railway	Bagworth and Ellistown; Line and station closed
