= Trentham Gardens railway station =

Former station in Staffordshire, England

Trentham Gardens

General information
- Location: Trentham, Staffordshire, Stoke-on-Trent; England
- Coordinates: 52.9690°N 2.1963°W
- Grid reference: SJ867412
- Platforms: 2

Other information
- Status: Disused

History
- Original company: North Staffordshire Railway
- Post-grouping: London, Midland and Scottish Railway; British Railways (London Midland region)

Key dates
- 28 March 1910: Opened as Trentham Park
- September 1927: closed to regular traffic
- 7 October 1946: renamed Trentham Gardens
- 1 October 1957: closed
Location

Trentham Gardens railway station (originally named Trentham Park) was the last station built by the North Staffordshire Railway (NSR) and was the terminus of the short 1 mile 14 chains (1.18 miles; 1.89 kilometres) Trentham Park branch.

The line was built to serve Trentham Gardens which had recently been opened to the public as pleasure gardens.

Regular passenger traffic on the branch line was withdrawn between 1927 and 1938 although excursion trains ran frequently. In 1938 a regular Sunday service was reintroduced but the outbreak of the Second World War led to the discontinuation of these services.

During the war the Bankers' Clearing House – the arrangement of the clearing banks to exchange cheques – was evacuated from London to Trentham Hall and regular goods trains ran to Trentham Park to deliver supplies. Excursion trains continued throughout the war.

After the war excursion trains continued, and in 1946 the station was renamed Trentham Gardens. The growth in car traffic made the branch line less economic and it closed at the end of 1957

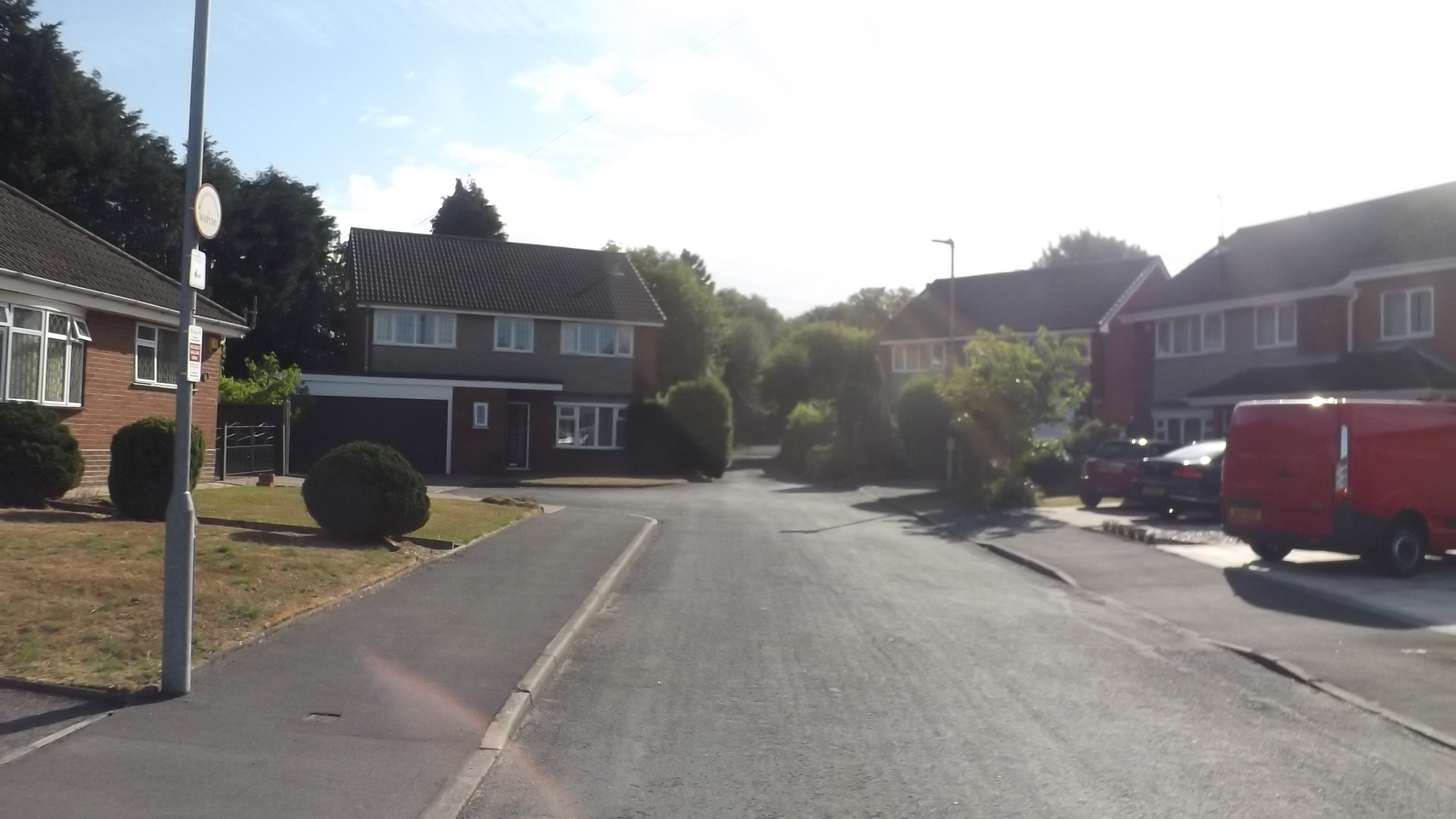
The station site photographed in 2018

Since closure the site of the station has been built upon and is now a housing estate.

Preceding station	Historical railways	Following station
Terminus	North Staffordshire Railway Trentham Park branch	Hanford Road Line and station closed
