= Tonmawr Junction railway station =

Short-lived railway station in Tonmawr, Neath Port Talbot

Tonmawr Junction

General information
- Location: Tonmawr, Glamorganshire; Wales

Other information
- Status: Disused

History
- Original company: Great Western Railway

Key dates
- November 1922: Opened
- 22 September 1930: Closed

Tonmawr Junction railway station served the village of Tonmawr, in the historical county of Glamorganshire, Wales, from 1922 to 1930 on the South Wales Mineral Railway.

== History ==
The station was opened in November 1922, although it had opened as Tonmawr Halt to miners in 1920. It appeared earlier in the timetables, on 2 October 1922. Trains only served the station on Saturdays. It closed on 22 September 1930.
