= Troedyrhifuwch Halt railway station =

Disused railway station in Tir-Phil, Caerphilly

Troedyrhifuwch Halt

General information
- Location: Tir-Phil, Glamorgan; Wales
- Coordinates: 51.7343°N 3.2583°W
- Grid reference: SO132047

Other information
- Status: Disused

History
- Original company: Rhymney Railway
- Pre-grouping: Rhymney Railway

Key dates
- 1 April 1908: Opened
- 1 January 1916: Closed
Location

Troedyrhifuwch Halt railway station served the villages of Troedrhiwfuwch and Tir-Phil, in the historic county of Glamorgan, Wales, from 1908 to 1916 on the Rhymney Railway.

== History ==
The station was opened on 1 April 1908 by the Rhymney Railway. It closed on 1 January 1916.

Preceding station	Disused railways	Following station
Pontlottyn; Line and station open	Rhymney Railway	Tir-Phil; Line and station open
