= Talgarth railway station =

Former rail station in central Wales

Talgarth
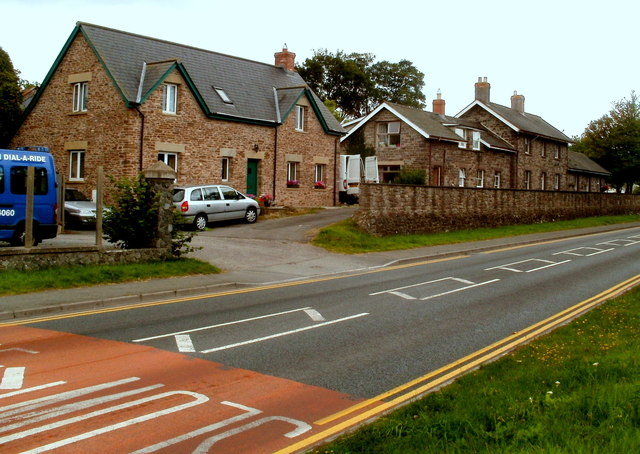
- Talgarth station in 2010

General information
- Location: Talgarth, Powys; Wales
- Coordinates: 51.9958°N 3.2353°W
- Platforms: 2

History
- Original company: Mid-Wales Railway
- Pre-grouping: Cambrian Railways
- Post-grouping: Great Western Railway

Key dates
- 21 September 1864: Opened
- 31 December 1962: Closed
Location

Talgarth railway station is a former railway station on the Mid-Wales Railway. It opened in 1864 and closed in 1962, serving the town of Talgarth in Powys, Wales.

== History ==
The station was opened in 1864 concurrent with the opening of the Mid-Wales company line between Llanidloes and Talyllyn Junction; regular services commenced in September 1864 but special trains had run at the end of August.

Closure came on 31 December 1962 when all lines to Brecon including the Mid-Wales line were closed.

== Present day ==
The original station buildings survive as private residence and the trackbed is now in use as part of the A479 road.

Preceding station	Disused railways	Following station
Three Cocks Junction; Line and station closed	Cambrian Railways; Mid-Wales Railway	Trefeinon; Line and station closed
