= Tongwynlais railway station =

Former railway station in Wales

Tongwynlais

General information
- Location: Tongwynlais, Cardiff; Wales
- Coordinates: 51.53047°N 3.25261°W
- Platforms: 2 (later 1)

Other information
- Status: Disused

History
- Original company: Cardiff Railway
- Post-grouping: Great Western Railway

Key dates
- 1 March 1911: opened
- 20 July 1931: closed
Location

Tongwynlais railway station served Tongwynlais in South Wales.

== History ==
The station was opened by the Cardiff Railway. Compared with the others on the line, Tongwynlais was one of the larger stations. It had two long platforms with a substantial wooden building on the up side. The platforms were linked with a metal footbridge. The 'down' platform closed on 16 May 1928 when the track was singled. The station closed to both goods and passengers in 1931. In 1947, the line re-opened, but the station did not.

== After closure ==
Despite having been closed for 30 years, the station remained in a reasonable condition for a long time, and the station building was still standing in 1961. However, no trace of the station remains, as it has since been buried under the A470 road.

Preceding station	Disused railways	Following station
Coryton; Line closed, station open	Great Western Railway; Cardiff Railway	Glan y Llyn; Line and station closed
