= Treforest Halt railway station =

Former railway station in Wales

Treforest Halt

General information
- Location: Treforest, Rhondda Cynon Taf; Wales
- Grid reference: ST086894
- Platforms: 2

Other information
- Status: Disused

History
- Original company: Pontypridd, Caerphilly and Newport Railway
- Post-grouping: Great Western Railway

Key dates
- 1 September 1904: opens as Treforest
- 1 July 1924: renamed Treforest Halt
- 17 September 1956: closes

Treforest Halt railway station was a small halt which served the village of Treforest between 1904 and 1956.

The halt had ground level platforms, with small corrugated waiting-sheds within fenced enclosures which were unlocked by conductors when a train arrived.

The station was renamed Treforest Halt in 1924. It closed in 1956. The site is now covered by the playing field of a comprehensive school.

Preceding station	Disused railways	Following station
Glyntaff Halt; Line and station closed	Great Western Railway; Pontyprid, Caerphilly & Newport Railway	Rhydyfelin (High Level) Halt; Line and station closed
