= Pontypridd Tram Road railway station =

Former railway station in Wales

Pontypridd Tram Road

General information
- Location: Pontypridd, Rhondda Cynon Taf; Wales
- Coordinates: 51.5991°N 3.3348°W
- Grid reference: ST076897
- Platforms: 1

Other information
- Status: Disused

History
- Original company: Alexandra (Newport and South Wales) Docks and Railway

Key dates
- 1 September 1904: Opened
- 10 July 1922: Closed
Location

Pontypridd Tram Road (also known as Pontypridd Tram Road Halt) was a railway station in Pontypridd, Wales. From 1904 to 1922, it served as the Pontypridd terminus of the Alexandra (Newport and South Wales) Docks and Railway's local passenger service between Pontypridd and Caerphilly.

== History ==
Incorporated in 1865, the Alexandra (Newport and South Wales) Docks and Railway (AD&N) promoted the nominally independent Pontypridd, Caerphilly and Newport Railway in 1878 as a means of connecting with the Taff Vale Railway to tap the rich traffic of the Taff and Rhondda valleys without incurring the wrath of the Great Western Railway (GWR) or the London and North Western Railway. The first section between Pontypridd and Penrhos Junction to the west of Caerphilly opened to goods traffic in 1884, with the second section from Bassaleg to Mendalgief Sidings via Park Junction opening in April 1886.

Passenger services began on 28 December 1887 with three services each way from Pontypridd to Newport, increasing to four in 1892. Staff of the AD&N operated the services until 1 January 1899 when the GWR agreed to take over through services. Local passenger services were started in April 1904 by the AD&N but the GWR refused to allow it entry to Pontypridd station unless the smaller company paid extra charges for the use of the junction or the station; this the AD&N was not prepared to do and so opened a station on its own metals to serve Pontypridd. This station was Tram Road Halt which opened on 1 September 1904 as a ground level platform on the bridge carrying the line over the Pontypridd tramway on the Broadway. The delay between the opening of the station and the commencement of local passenger services was due to the need to obtain Board of Trade approval for what was classed as a 'motor car service' between Pontypridd and Caerphilly. The railway halt consisted of wooden planks laid next to each other on the Up side of the line, together with a basic wooden passenger shelter.

As no crossover was provided, services had to be worked "wrong line" for 400 yards (370 m) to the crossover near Glyntaff Halt where it could cross onto the correct line; this practice continued until 1 May 1906 when the signalling arrangements were revised. The station had been rebuilt by 28 April 1906 when it was again inspected by an officer from the Board of Trade who reported that the ground level platform had been replaced by one 100 feet (30 m) long and 10 feet (3.0 m) wide, at a height of 3 feet 6 inches (1.07 m) above rail level. The shelter had been extended to provide ladies' accommodation and toilets, and additional lighting had been installed. A ramp led up to the platform which was fenced and gated, with access only given when a train was about to depart.

The AD&N became a constituent of the GWR at the Grouping with effect from 1 January 1923. As a result, the Halt was closed on 10 July 1922. The line itself was closed to passengers on 17 September 1956 and to goods on 20 July 1964.

Preceding station	Disused railways	Following station
Terminus	Alexandra Docks and Railway; Pontypridd, Caerphilly and Newport Railway	Glyntaff Halt; Line and station closed

== Present ==
The trackbed of the Pontypridd, Caerphilly and Newport Railway through Pontypridd has been taken over by the A470 Pontypridd and Rhondda bypass road. In June 1986 the piers of the bridge on which Tram Road Halt was constructed were demolished and the site cleared to make way for a car park.

== See also ==
- Pontypridd railway station
- Pontypridd Graig railway station
