= Trentham, Staffordshire =

Coordinates: 52.966348°N 2.189856°W

Trentham
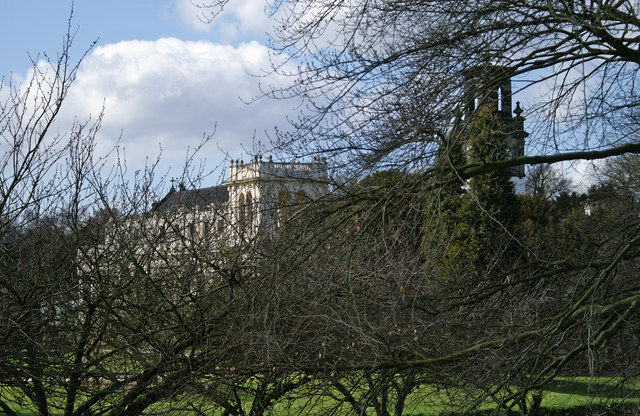
- Trentham Hall

- Location within Staffordshire
- Population: 11,836 (2011.Ward. Hanford and Trentham)
- OS grid reference: SJ872410
- Unitary authority: Stoke-on-Trent
- Ceremonial county: Staffordshire
- Region: West Midlands
- Country: England
- Sovereign state: United Kingdom
- Post town: STOKE-ON-TRENT
- Postcode district: ST4
- Dialling code: 01782
- Police: Staffordshire
- Fire: Staffordshire
- Ambulance: West Midlands
- UK Parliament: Stoke-on-Trent South

Trentham (/ˈtrɛntəm/) is a suburb of the city of Stoke-on-Trent, in north Staffordshire, England, south-west of the city centre and south of the neighbouring town of Newcastle-under-Lyme. It is separated from the main urban area by open space and by the Trent and Mersey Canal and the River Trent, giving it the feel of a village.

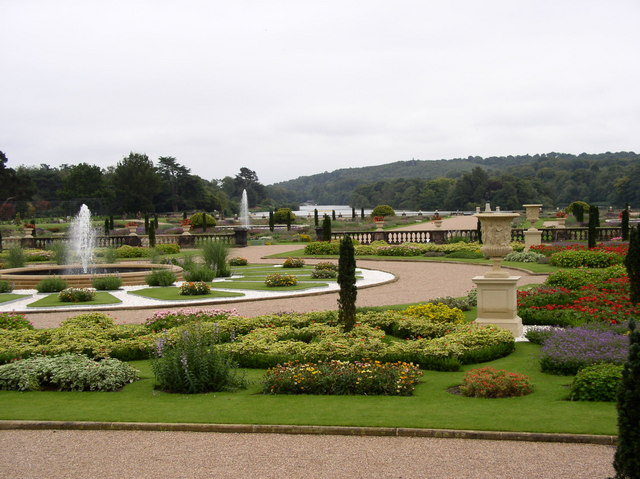
Trentham Gardens

== Boundaries ==
The River Trent is the border between the City of Stoke-on-Trent and Stafford borough for most of its southerly flow past Trentham. Some parts of Trentham are in Stafford Borough, notably the parish church and the remaining buildings of the Trentham Hall estate in the parish of Swynnerton which are classed as a conservation area.

== History ==
The Mercian princess Werburgh, born in Stone, died in Trentham in 699 AD. She became the patron saint of the city of Chester in Cheshire. Her feast day is 3 February.

Trentham was the site of Trentham Priory, dissolved in 1540. The Lordship of the manor of Trentham existed from 1149 to 1541.

Trentham village was the estate village for Trentham Hall and the Trentham Estate, the former country seat of the Dukes of Sutherland. Their private Sutherland Mausoleum is a prominent landmark next to the A34 road and the only Grade I listed building in the city.

On 1 April 1922 the civil parish was abolished and merged with Swynnerton, Barlaston and Whitmore. At the 1921 census (the last before the abolition of the parish), Trentham had a population of 726.

Trentham was not one of the historic "six towns" which joined to form a city in the original Federation of Stoke-on-Trent in 1910. Trentham joined the federation a little later, in the 1922 expansion.

In World War I, Trentham was bombed by the Imperial German Navy Zeppelin 'L 21' in 1916. During the Second World War of 1939-1945 Trentham Ballroom was used by the Bankers' Clearing House for clearing the country's cheques. The grounds were also used to station thousands of French troops who had fled Europe at the fall of France in 1940.

Trentham Colliery opened in 1925 and closed in 1993. In 1993, it was the site of protests by the North Staffordshire Miners' Wives Action Group, including round-the-clock camps and the occupation of Trentham pit by three women who chained themselves to machinery inside the mine.

== Trentham today ==
Trentham has two Anglican churches, three public houses, a cafe/bar, a rugby club, a Scout Group, two primary schools (Ash Green and The Priory) and a high school (Trentham High School).

The village was previously served by Trentham (Staffordshire) railway station and Wedgwood railway station on the Stafford to Manchester Line

Trentham station closed in 1957 and currently no trains stop at Wedgwood railway station, the service having been replaced by a rail replacement bus service. As of 2019 it is proposed to permanently close Wedgwood railway station.

The ducal estate of the Sutherland family is now branded as Trentham Gardens following a substantial and costly regeneration effort by St. Modwen, and the estate is now one of the region's major leisure and tourist attractions. The Trentham Lake on the estate is home to the Trentham Boat Club.

== Notable people ==
- William Theed (1804–1891) an English sculptor, versatile and eclectic in his works, he specialised in portraiture
- Sam Hughes (1824–1898) the last great ophicleide player, the ophicleide was the bass-baritone instrument of the brass family, replacing the serpent and in turn being replaced by the euphonium.

== Bibliography ==
- The Making of the Six Towns ISBN 0-905080-42-4.

== See also ==
- Trentham (Staffordshire) railway station
- Trentham Gardens railway station
