= Templeton railway station =

Disused railway station in Templeton, Pembrokeshire

Templeton
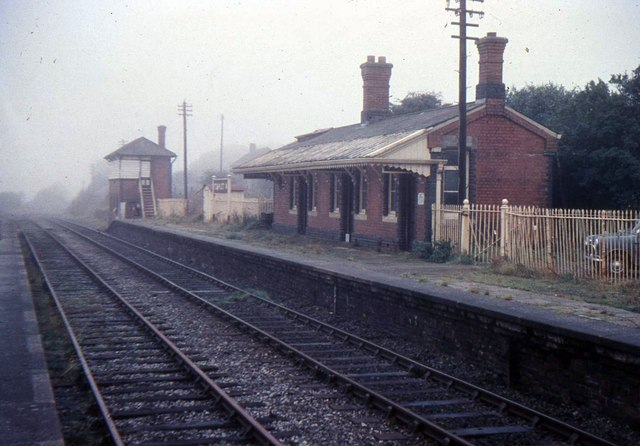
- The station building and signal box after closure in 1967

General information
- Location: Templeton, Pembrokeshire; Wales
- Coordinates: 51.767°N 4.7361°W
- Grid reference: SN113111
- Platforms: 2

Other information
- Status: Disused

History
- Original company: Pembroke and Tenby Railway
- Pre-grouping: Great Western Railway
- Post-grouping: Great Western Railway

Key dates
- 1867: Opened on market days
- October 1877: Opened to public as Templeton Platform
- 1905: Name changed to Templeton
- 15 June 1964: Closed
Location

Templeton railway station served the village of Templeton, Pembrokeshire, Wales, from 1877 to 1964 on the Pembroke and Tenby Railway.

== History ==
The station was opened as Templeton Platform in October 1877 by the Pembroke and Tenby Railway, although there is evidence of trains stopping before the station was built in 1867. It was then only used for market trains until it appeared in the timetable in October 1877. It was initially open on Fridays and Saturdays only but it opened every day on 1 May 1906. 'Platform' was dropped from its name in 1905. The station closed on 15 June 1964.

Preceding station	Historical railways	Following station
Narberth; Line and station open	Pembroke and Tenby Railway	Kilgetty; Line and station open
