= Trentham (Staffordshire) railway station =

Former railway station in England

Trentham

General information
- Location: Trentham, Staffordshire, Stoke-on-Trent; England
- Coordinates: 52.9682°N 2.1742°W
- Grid reference: SJ883411
- Platforms: 3

Other information
- Status: Disused

History
- Original company: North Staffordshire Railway
- Post-grouping: London, Midland and Scottish Railway; British Railways (London Midland region)

Key dates
- 17 April 1848: Opened
- 28 March 1910: Trentham Junction platform opened
- 1 October 1957: Trentham Junction platform closed
- 2 March 1964: Closed
Location

Trentham railway station was built by the North Staffordshire Railway (NSR) as part of the main line south from Stoke towards Stafford and served the village of Trentham, Staffordshire, England.

The original station opened along with the first section of the Stafford to Manchester Line in 1848. As the station was the closest to Trentham Hall, at the time the principal residence of the Dukes of Sutherland, new station buildings were constructed in 1851 to a design by Charles Barry.

== Trentham Junction ==
In 1910 the NSR opened the Trentham Park branch to serve Trentham Gardens. This new line joined the main line slightly to the north of Trentham station and, to enable passengers travelling to/from stations south of Trentham to exchange to the branch, a new single platform station called Trentham Junction was opened. Reached from Trentham station by a short walk, Trentham Junction was always operated as part of Trentham station and never featured separately in public timetables.

== Closure ==
The Trentham Branch line closed to regular passenger traffic in 1927 but continued in use for excursion traffic until 1 October 1957 when the branch and the Trentham Junction platform finally closed The main Trentham station closed in the Beeching cuts of 1964.

Preceding station	Historical railways	Following station
Sideway Halt Line open, station closed	North Staffordshire Railway Stafford to Manchester Line	Barlaston Line open, station not served by rail
Sideway Halt Line open, station closed	London, Midland and Scottish Railway Stafford to Manchester Line	Wedgwood Line open, station not served by rail
Terminus	North Staffordshire Railway Trentham Park branch	Hanford Road Halt Line and station closed
