= Upper Boat railway station =

Former railway station in Wales

Upper Boat

General information
- Location: Upper Boat, Rhondda Cynon Taf; Wales
- Coordinates: 51.5769°N 3.2934°W
- Grid reference: ST104873
- Platforms: 2 (later 1)

Other information
- Status: Disused

History
- Original company: Cardiff Railway
- Post-grouping: Great Western Railway

Key dates
- 1 March 1911: station opened
- 20 June 1931: station closed
Location

Upper Boat railway station was a former station which served Upper Boat, Rhondda Cynon Taf, between 1911 and 1931.

== History ==
The station was opened by the Cardiff Railway. It was the second station to serve Upper Boat after Upper Boat Halt which had been opened by the Pontypridd, Newport and Caerphilly Railway in 1904. It had two platforms and a substantial station building. The footbridge at the station, which linked the platforms with the top of the nearby embankment was the longest on the line.

The 'down' platform at Upper Boat was taken out of use in 1928. The station closed completely in 1931.

== After closure ==
The station building, complete with its canopy, was still largely intact in 1956, but no longer exists. The site was occupied by the premises of a building merchant for DIY enthusiasts. It is now part of the car park for the retail outlet Dunelm's

Preceding station	Disused railways	Following station
Nantgarw (Low Level) Halt; Line and station closed	Great Western Railway; Cardiff Railway	Rhydyfelin (Low Level) Halt; Line and station closed
