= Ainon Baptist Church (Tongwynlais) =

Church in Cardiff, Wales

Ainon, Tongwynlais
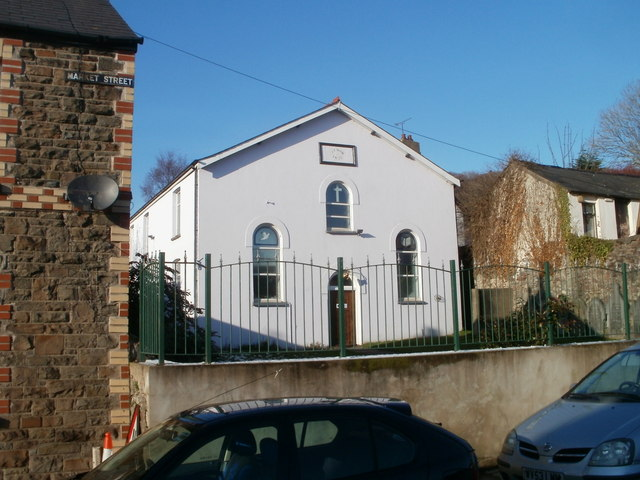
- Ainon, Tongwynlais
- 51.5321°N 3.2523°W
- Denomination: Baptist
- Website: http://www.ainonbaptistchurch.co.uk/

History
- Status: Active
- Founded: 1828

Architecture
- Completed: 1832

Ainon Baptist Church, Tongwynlais is an independent Baptist church which has operated in the village of Tongwynlais in Cardiff, Wales, for over 180 years.

== History ==
The preacher Christmas Evans had been based at Tonyfelin Chapel in Caerphilly between 1826 and 1828. During this time, he preached sermons at the Lewis Arms public house in Tongwynlais. Evans' time in the district was brief, but such was its impact that in 1828, Ainon was established. The present building was constructed in 1832, and is the oldest church building in Tongwynlais.The church's interior was updated and modernised in 2003.

The practice in the village of the churches taking Whitsun outings together died out in the mid-20th Century, but Ainon remains an active church.
