= Coundon Grange =

Village in County Durham, England

Coordinates: 54.6468°N 1.6480°W

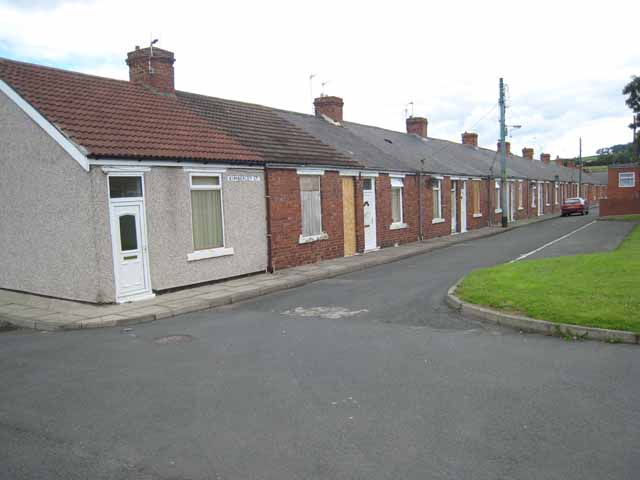
- Front of Kimberley Street

- Location within County Durham
- Population: 235 (2001 census)
- Civil parish: Dene Valley
- Unitary authority: County Durham
- Ceremonial county: Durham
- Region: North East
- Country: England
- Sovereign state: United Kingdom
- Post town: BISHOP AUCKLAND
- Postcode district: DL14
- Dialling code: 01388

Coundon Grange is a village in the civil parish of Dene Valley, in County Durham, England. It is situated to the east of Bishop Auckland. In the 2001 census Coundon Grange had a population of 235.

== Governance ==
Coundon Grange was formerly a township in the parish of Auckland St. Andrew, in 1866 Coundon Grange became a separate civil parish, on 1 April 1937 the parish was abolished and merged with Bishop Auckland. In 1931 the parish had a population of 3109.
