= Ely Valley Railway =

Railway in south Wales, United Kingdom

Overview
- Locale: Wales

Technical
- Track gauge: broad gauge
Route map
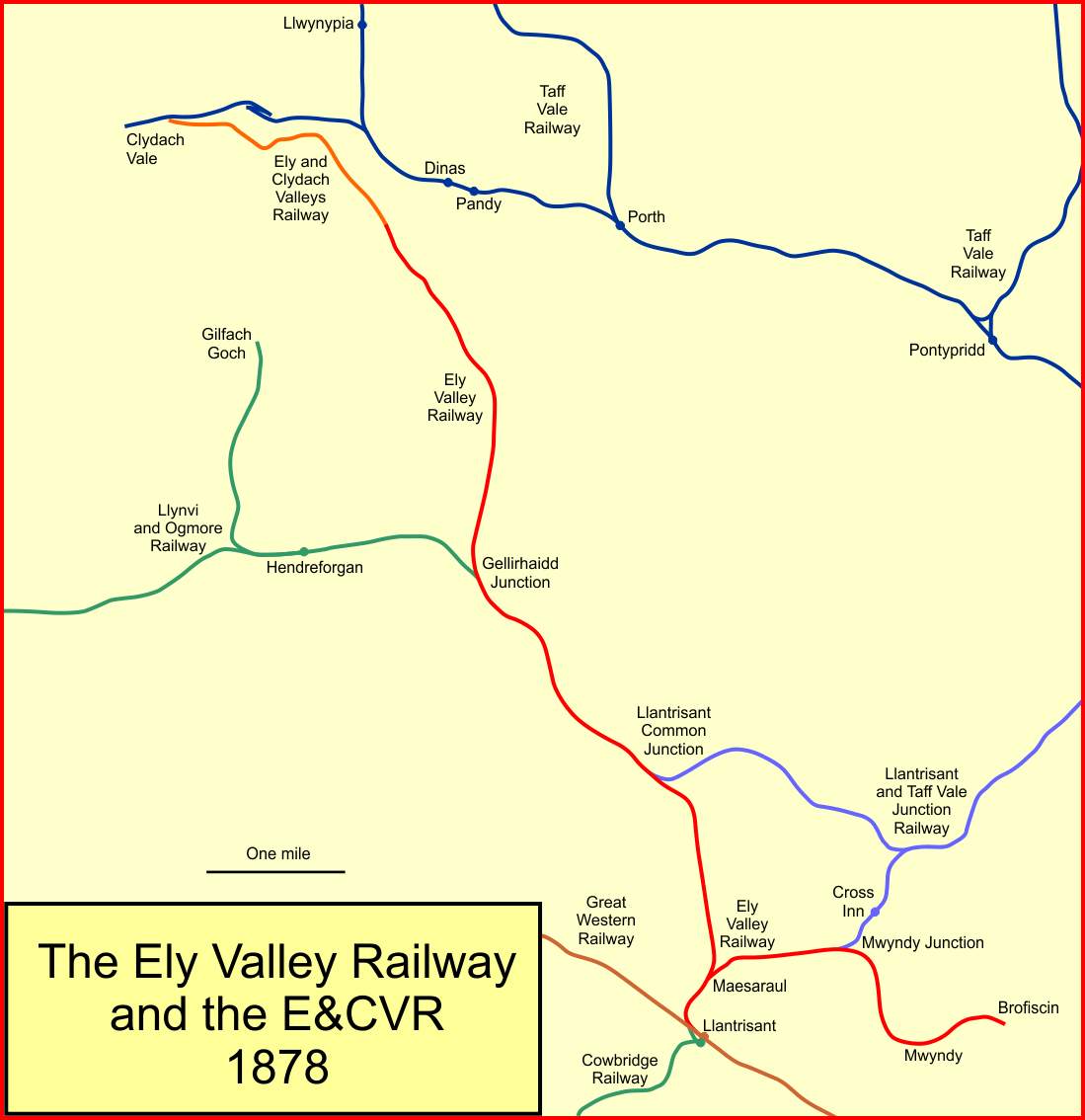

The Ely Valley Railway (EVR) was a broad gauge railway company in South Wales, which opened a mineral line between Llantrisant station on the South Wales Railway main line and pits at Mwyndy and Penrhiwfer in 1860.

It was unsuccessful financially, and was leased to the Great Western Railway in 1861. The network suffered from being on the broad gauge when many pits and rival railways used the narrow (standard) gauge, but the GWR extended the network into Cwm Clydach and the line became heavily used. The Ely Valley Extension Railway and the Ely and Clydach Valleys Railway were nominally independent additions to the network, also controlled by the GWR.

A limited passenger service was started in 1901. The use of the network declined in the 1920s but the passenger service continued until 1958. The general mineral traffic collapsed in the 1960s but final closure only occurred when Cwm Colliery closed on 2 March 1987.

== First railways ==
The mineral resources of the upper end of the valley of the River Taff encouraged the development of iron smelting industries at Merthyr and Dowlais, and these were dominant by the first decades of the nineteenth century. Transport of the products to market was always a problem, and the Glamorganshire Canal of 1794 and primitive tramroads connecting to it were an early response.

The Taff Vale Railway was opened in 1840 and 1841 throughout from Merthyr to Cardiff Docks, and was immediately successful. It was a narrow (standard) gauge line; its course was through the present-day Abercynon and Pontypridd.

Mineral extraction at Dihewyd, near Llantwit Fardre, attracted interest, and a private railway was built from pits there to the Glamorganshire Canal at Maesbach. The pits and the railway were owned by Thomas Powell. The line had a rope-worked incline to descend into the Taff valley. It opened in April 1844 and was known as the Llantwit Fardre Railway.

Promoters associated with the Great Western Railway obtained authorisation for a trunk line from near Gloucester to Milford Haven, connecting South Wales to the GWR network and London, and the first section of their line between Chepstow and Swansea opened on 18 June 1850. Both lines were engineered by Isambard Kingdom Brunel, but the South Wales Railway was built on the broad gauge. It had a station called Llantrisant, although it was two miles from the town of that name. (Note: The station is now known as Pontyclun.) As a trunk railway, the South Wales Railway made few connections to collieries and iron mines, and the development of these industries in the area close to the main line was as yet limited.

In 1840 there was mineral activity in the Rhondda but at this stage it was limited to the area around Dinas, served by tramroads with which an 1841 branch of the Taff Vale Railway connected; the westward extension was in the future.

In 1845 a Rhondda and Ely Valley Railway was proposed; it would leave the South Wales Railway at Llantrisant and run to the head of the Rhondda Fawr, connecting also to proposed railways in the Ogmore Valley. On 16 September 1845 the promoters published their intention to obtain an act of Parliament authorising their line; the Taff Vale Railway had been aware of the move (from prior public meetings) and simultaneously published its own corresponding proposals to reach the Rhondda Fawr; the far greater resources resulted in the Ely Valley scheme being abandoned immediately.

== Ely Valley Railway authorised ==
In October 1856 it was announced that the Ely and Rhondda Valleys Railway was being promoted, although at first it would only build eight miles of line, from Llantrisant to Dinas (Penygraig). In November the statutory parliamentary notice was published; the company name had been altered to the Ely Valley Railway; it was to be a broad gauge line 6 1/2 miles long from Llantrisant to Penrhiwfer, with two branches. It was primarily a mineral railway, and passengers would not be carried.

Ely Valley Railway Act 1857
- Act of Parliament
- Parliament of the United Kingdom
- Long title: An Act for making a Railway from the Llantrissant Station of the South Wales Railway to Penrhiwfer in the Parish of Llantrissant in the County of Glamorgan, with Branches to Glanmychydd and Mynydd Gellyrhaidd, both in the said Parish of Llantrissant.
- Citation: 20 & 21 Vict. c. xli

Dates
- Royal assent: 13 July 1857

Text of statute as originally enacted

Ely Valley (Mwyndy Branch) Act 1858
- Act of Parliament
- Parliament of the United Kingdom
- Long title: An Act to authorize the Ely Valley Railway Company to make a Branch Railway, to be called "The Mwyndy Branch;" and for other Purposes.
- Citation: 21 & 22 Vict. c. xxx

Dates
- Royal assent: 14 June 1858

The bill went to Parliament and encountered only limited opposition, and the Ely Valley Railway Act 1857 (20 & 21 Vict. c. xli) received royal assent on 13 July 1857, with capital of £70,000. At the first formal board meeting it was decided to seek powers to build a branch to the productive Mwyndy iron ore mine, and possibly on to Brofiscin Quarry. This was successfully achieved in the Ely Valley (Mwyndy Branch) Act 1858 (21 & 22 Vict. c. xxx), with an additional £13,000 of capital authorised.

Construction work was soon under way, and the directors decided that it was a high priority to open to the Mwyndy mine so as to bring some money in. Temporary track and horse traction was used to manage this, and an informal opening took place before 22 February 1859.

== Ely Tidal Harbour ==
The Ely Tidal Harbour and Railway Company had been incorporated by the Ely Tidal Harbour and Railway (Glamorgan) Act 1856 (19 & 20 Vict. c. cxxii) of 21 July 1856 to build a harbour at the mouth of the River Ely, to the west of Cardiff, and to build a narrow (standard) gauge railway to meet the Taff Vale Railway at the place that is now Radyr. The primary purpose of this was to relieve the congestion at the Bute docks on the east side of Cardiff, and on the approach lines of the TVR.

The following year, on 27 July 1857 the company changed its name to the Penarth Harbour, Dock and Railway, and the scope was increased to add the dock. The harbour was relatively quickly made ready, opening for business on 18 July 1859, but the dock took considerably longer, in fact until 1865.

As well as carrying the traffic of the TVR to its new harbour, the Penarth company was interested in the traffic that might come from the Ely company, located as it was on the west side of Cardiff. A meeting took place between the two companies on 15 December 1858, at which the Penarth company suggested a narrow (standard) gauge link between them.

When the Ely Valley Railway (EVR) was planned, the only other railway in the vicinity was the broad gauge South Wales Railway, and it seemed obvious at the time to make the EVR line on the same gauge. On reflection, however, this posed some serious disadvantages; iron ore bound for the Merthyr and Dowlais smelters had to travel via Neath and the Vale of Neath Railway, and be transhipped near the end of the journey. Moreover there were limited facilities at Cardiff for supplying ships from broad gauge wagons.

The Penarth company now recommended a narrow gauge connection, and the idea seemed attractive to the Ely Valley Railway (EVR) directors. In addition to the EVR converting its system to the narrow gauge, this could best be achieved by the South Wales Railway laying a third rail, to make mixed gauge track between Llantrisant and the junction for Penarth; in fact the scheme escalated to include the route as far as the Bute East Dock, mutual running powers being offered. The South Wales Railway was not hostile to these arrangements, but wished to get Great Western Railway (GWR) acquiescence. In fact the GWR were entirely opposed to the plan, seeing no benefit to compensate for the expense of carrying it out, and the negotiations were at an end; the EVR had wrapped up a number of secondary, but important, issues in the talks, and now these were lost as well.

As a fallback, the EVR and the Penarth company discussed the building of a connecting line between the two systems; all seemed to be going well, with discussion of assistance with funding. But in March 1860 the magnitude of the costs involved in building the new line and converting the existing EVR system was addressed, and it was quickly seen that the whole thing was not affordable.

== Opening the line ==
The Ely Valley Railway (EVR) was not yet fully open, and thoughts now turned urgently to the working arrangements for their line. On 15 June 1860, an agreement was concluded with the joint operating committee of the South Wales Railway and the Great Western Railway (Note: The Great Western Railway was working the South Wales Railway by contract.) (GWR) as to the working of the Mwyndy branch by the GWR, and a corresponding agreement for the Ely Valley main line was finalised soon after. The effective date of these agreements was to be 1 August 1860.

On 2 August 1860 a ceremonial opening of the lines took place. As well as the Mwyndy branch, the main line ran from Llantrisant station to Penrhiwfer, a little beyond Tonyrefail, where there were important collieries. There were two short branches: one was to Castellau, diverging north-eastward not far north of Llantrisant; the other was to Gellirhaidd, running to the west from a point not far south of Penrhiwfer.

The Mwyndy branch was extended to Brofiscin, opening on 8 January 1862. (Note: Barrie and Baughan say that Gellirhaidd opened in January 1862.)

== Lease to the Great Western Railway ==
For some time the Great Western Railway, quite independently of the South Wales Railway, had taken an interest in the developing collieries near Gyfeillon, in the Rhondda a little west of Pontypridd, where excellent quality steam coal was being extracted. In 1854 the GWR had leased a colliery belonging to John Calvert, using it to supply locomotive coal. It became known as the Great Western Mine.

The GWR now approached the EVR with a proposal to acquire the network; the plan was to extend it to Gyfeillon, giving the GWR broad gauge access from the colliery to its system. The EVR asked for £100,000 in cash to purchase, and difficult negotiations progressed, ending with a 999 year lease, taking £35,000 worth of EVR shares and guaranteeing 5% per annum on £80,000. This was agreed and was effective from 1 January 1861, being ratified by the Great Western, Hereford, Ross and Gloucester, and Ely Valley Railways Act 1862 (25 & 26 Vict. c. cxcvi) of 29 July 1862. (in fact the Gyfeillon extension was never built.)

== Narrow gauge lines at Llantrisant ==
At the time these discussions were proceeding, the Taff Vale Railway were encouraging the promotion of what became the Llantrisant and Taff Vale Junction Railway (L&TVJR), a line to Llantrisant from near Treforest, connecting up numerous small mines on between, and forming an intrusion into territory that the broad gauge companies considered their own.

The L&TVJR was authorised on 7 June 1861, and opened part of its line at the northern end on 17 September 1863. However the southern end of the L&TVJR was a junction with the broad gauge Ely Valley Railway at Maesaraul.

The Cowbridge Railway was designed to give the town a connection to the merging railway network, but was short of funding. When the Taff Vale Railway assisted it by taking part of the share issue, it was inevitable that the line would be built on the narrow gauge.

The Cowbridge Railway intended to cross the South Wales Railway main line and connect with the L&TVJR at Maesaraul, but this proved beyond its means, and it settled for running into a platform alongside the South Wales Railway station at Llantrisant. That left a gap between the two narrow gauge systems; as part of the negotiation in parliamentary committees, the GWR undertook to mix the gauge on the Ely Valley Railway between Maesaraul and Llantrisant, enabling through running; the necessary running powers were granted to the Cowbridge Railway.

In fact a second, narrow gauge, line was built from Llantrisant to Mwyndy Junction, the lines being mixed onward from there.

The Taff Vale Railway worked the trains on both the Cowbridge and L&TVJR systems, so that passenger trains ran through from Pontypridd to Cowbridge, reversing at Llantrisant. This started on 18 September 1865, when the Ely Valley Railway had finally got approval from the Board of Trade for passenger operation over the mixed gauge section.

The Cowbridge Railway had opened for goods traffic on 30 January 1865.

The Ely Valley Railway had separately undertaken to lay mixed gauge track to enable access for the L&TVJR to Mwyndy, but, no doubt encouraged by the Great Western Railway, was very slow to do so, and a legalistic point over the extent of the branch was used to delay matters. It was not until 5 December 1864 that the installation of mixed gauge was done.

== North from Penrhiwfer ==
The northern terminus of the Ely Valley Railway was at Penrhiwfer, near Tonyrefail; there were important pits there. There were further productive pits a little further north, near Penygraig, in Cwm Clydach. In 1860 a parliamentary bill to build such an extension was withdrawn, but the EVR negotiated privately with the landowners; with their agreement a mineral railway could be built without needing to obtain legal powers in an act of Parliament.

The agreement was finalised in October 1860 and the extension was opened to traffic in December 1862. The northern terminus was now at Dinas Goods Station, immediately north of Penygraig colliery. The extension was ratified by the Great Western Railway (Further Powers) Act 1866 (29 & 30 Vict. c. cccvii) of 30 July 1866.

== Ely and Clydach Valleys Railway ==
Cwm Clydach was a little further on and the existing pits were served by the TVR Pwllyrhebog branch. This involved a 1 in 13 incline, at this stage a rope worked incline operated on the balanced load system without a stationary steam engine. This was causing congestion as traffic volumes increased, and when a new pit was sunk further up the valley at Clydach Vale in 1872, potentially overwhelming the incline, the Ely Valley Railway considered it was time to compete with the TVR.

A nominally independent Ely and Clydach Valleys Railway was promoted in 1872, to run from a junction near Dinas on the EVR (Note: Now effectively part of the Great Western Railway.) to the head of Cwm Clydach, nearly two miles away. The company obtained its authorising act of Parliament, the Ely and Clydach Valleys Railway Act 1873 (36 & 37 Vict. c. ccxxx), on 5 August 1873. It opened, at least in part, on 10 August 1878, but the anticipated traffic was a long time in coming, partly because of an agreement between the coalmaster and the Taff Vale Railway for exclusivity of carriage of its output.

The Ely and Clydach Valleys Railway was vested in the Great Western Railway effective from 27 August 1880, by the Great Western Railway Act 1880 (43 & 44 Vict. c. cxli) of 6 August.

== Ely Valley Extension Railway ==
Ely Valley Extension Railway Act 1863
- Act of Parliament
- Parliament of the United Kingdom
- Long title: An Act for incorporating a Company, and for making and maintaining the Ely Valley Extension Railway; and for other Purposes.
- Citation: 26 & 27 Vict. c. cxcix

Dates
- Royal assent: 28 July 1863

Text of statute as originally enacted

The terminus of the Gellirhaidd branch appeared ideal for a westward extension into the Ogmore Valleys, and from 1857 a number of schemes were out forward. These were without success until 28 July 1863 when the Ely Valley Extension Railway was authorised by the Ely Valley Extension Railway Act 1863 (26 & 27 Vict. c. cxcix), though in a much reduced form compared with its promoters' intentions. Instead of forming a link from Gellirhaidd into the Ogmore Valley, it was reduced to a stump from Hendreforgan to Gilfach Goch only; at this stage Hendreforgan had not been reached by any railway.

At the same time the Ogmore Valley Railway (OVR) was authorised to build from Tondu via Blackmill to the present-day Nantymoel at the head of the Ogmore Valley. The promoters had observed the disadvantages of small railways adopting the broad gauge, and they determined that their line would be on the narrow (standard) gauge. However their isolated position among broad gauge lines challenged the ability of their line to get the mineral products away to Cardiff or anywhere else. The Great Western Railway (GWR) and the South Wales Railway had now merged, and the promoters of the OVR met with the GWR to ascertain whether they would lay mixed gauge on the main line to accommodate the OVR trains, but this was refused.

The OVR proprietors were unabashed, and decided to continue with the construction of their line on the narrow gauge. To get access to a waterway, they now planned to build a line to connect to the narrow gauge Penarth Harbour, Dock and Railway company. This company was friendly to the Taff Vale Railway and the Llantrisant and Taff Vale Junction Railway lay in between; an alliance between those companies, and some use of existing railways, would provide an affordable scheme. This was considered in the 1865 session of Parliament and rejected, but a second attempt in 1866 was more successful. Notwithstanding its opposition to laying mixed gauge on the South Wales Main Line, the GWR had given a parliamentary assurance that it would do so on the portion of the Ely Valley Railway to enable narrow gauge trains to run from Hendreforgan to Common Branch Junction (near Ynysmaerdy) reaching the L&TVJR there.

Ogmore and Ely Railways (Amalgamation) Act 1865
- Act of Parliament
- Parliament of the United Kingdom
- Long title: An Act for the Amalgamation of the Ogmore Valley Railways Company and the Ely Valley Extension Railway Company; and for other Purposes.
- Citation: 28 & 29 Vict. c. ccv

Dates
- Royal assent: 5 July 1865

Text of statute as originally enacted

In the 1865 session of Parliament, the Ogmore and Ely Railways (Amalgamation) Act 1865 (Note: Chapman suggests this may be a mistake for "Ogmore and Ely Valley Extension Railways Act".) (28 & 29 Vict. c. ccv) was passed, by which the Ely Valley Extension Railway was taken over by the Ogmore Valley Railway. The Ely Valley Extension Railway opened its line on 16 October 1865, and was worked by the Great Western Railway as part of the Ely Valley line. (It was converted to narrow gauge in May 1872 and remained detached from the Ogmore network until the completion of the Black Mill to Hendreforgan line in September 1875.)

The L&TVJR secured the Llantrissant and Taff Vale Junction Railway Act 1866 (29 & 30 Vict. c. ccxlviii) (the 'New Lines Act') on 23 July 1866. It would build a new line on a north-west to south-east diagonal, from the Ely Valley Railway at Ynysmaerdy to Waterhall Junction south of Radyr, on the Penarth Harbour line.

The Ogmore Valley Bill was passed on the same day, authorising a connection between Blackmill and Hendreforgan, although the OVR had hoped for much wider extensions elsewhere.

Following authorisation, the emphasis on the flow from the Ogmore Valley to Penarth was much reduced, and these lines were slow to be completed; the Blackmill to Hendreforgan line of the OVR (merged to form the Llynvi and Ogmore Railway) was opened on 1 September 1875, and the Hendreforgan – Ynysmaerdy link opened on 25 February 1875. The L&TVJR line to Waterhall Junction, for Penarth, took much longer still, opening on 11 September 1886.

== Absorption of the South Wales Railway ==
The South Wales Railway had been formed as an independent company, but it was worked throughout its life by the Great Western Railway. Merging of the companies was to be a positive move, and the GWR absorbed the South Wales Railway, effective from 1 August 1863. The Ely Valley Railway was already leased to the SWR and the lease now transferred to the GWR.

== Castellau branch closed ==
In 1864 a local newspaper reported that "The Castella Colliery of Dr Lloyd is nearly exhausted." and when serviceable permanent way materials were urgently needed to keep the main lines going at a time of great financial pressure, the track of the branch was taken up, some time after 31 January 1867.

== Gauge conversion ==
For some years the GWR had accepted that the broad gauge was a liability that had to be got rid of, but the latter half of the 1860s were very difficult financially, and the matter was delayed. From 11 May 1872 all the broad gauge lines in South Wales were progressively converted, including the Ely Valley Railway and all other leased and independent lines, the process being completed on 29 May.

The two single tracks, broad and narrow gauge, from Llantrisant to Mwyndy Junction were now installed as conventional double track.

== Cil Ely Colliery ==
The Great Western Railway (GWR) had earlier taken a lease on a colliery at Gyfeillon for engine coal, but never used it and relinquished the lease. Now in April 1874 it negotiated a lease with the owner of Cil Ely Colliery, a short distance north of Tonyrefail, and this became a prime supplier to the GWR.

== Passengers ==
From the outset the Ely Valley Railway had decided that it did not wish to carry passengers, and the relatively small income in a sparsely populated area did not justify the outlay. Over the years the population in the area built up, and the company came under pressure to provide passenger trains. It continued to refuse to do this but in 1893 Glamorgan County Council took the company to the adjudication court of the Railway and Canal Commissioners. In the days when railways were often a local monopoly, there was legal precedent for courts to require the provision of a passenger service. Legal argument was finely balanced, and in 1894 the EVR won its case on the basis that it was agreed that substantial infrastructure improvements—doubling much of the line (because of the density of mineral traffic), building stations etc—that the court did not have the power to demand.

As this was an obvious technicality, the GWR considered how a passenger service might be provided. A double track section between Common Branch Junction and Gellirhaidd Junction, with passing loops at other places, Penrhiwfer and Penygraig, was a starting point, and this was done, opening on 20 December 1896.

The section between Gellirhaidd and Penygraig was next on the agenda; there was a summit at Penrhiwfer, and as part of the work, the line would be lowered by 20 feet there. This was carried out some time at the end of 1897 and in 1898. The passenger service started on 1 May 1901. The new stations were at Tonyrefail and Penygraig. There were typically five trains each way daily except Sundays. Coed Ely station was opened further down the valley on 13 July 1925.

== Absorption by the GWR ==
The Ely Valley Railway network was leased to the Great Western Railway for 999 years. In 1920 the question of absorption was considered by both companies. Both were agreeable to the idea and it took place on 1 July 1903, authorised by the Great Western Railway Act 1903 (3 Edw. 7. c. cxcvi) of 11 August 1903. Ely Valley shareholders received £120 Great Western 5% guaranteed for £100 Ely consolidated.

== Road competition ==
In the 1920s road competition for passenger transport became active: tramways and trolleybuses at first and then motor buses as interurban roads were improved. Carryings on the passenger trains of the Ely Valley Railway fell disastrously. Freight traffic fared as badly; ordinary goods business was susceptible to more flexible road lorry competition in the same way as the passenger services. The decline of some of the pits, partly from overseas competition, led to falling volumes of mineral traffic.

The passenger service on the Ely Valley Extension Railway line (now GWR) was suspended between 5 March and 26 March 1928, and withdrawn finally on 22 September 1930. Goods services continued until 5 June 1961.

The end of the Mwyndy branch, actually from Mwyndy siding and Brofiscin, was closed from November 1936.

On 31 March 1952 the Llantrisant to Pontypridd passenger service was closed; this had run over part of the Ely Valley network as far as Maesaraul Junction.

The last ordinary passenger trains on the Ely Valley Railway itself, between Llantrisant and Penygraig, ran on 7 June 1958, but there was a special excursion to Porthcawl the following day.

The entire Ely Valley Extension Railway network was closed on 30 June 1960, as well as the EVR Gellyrhaidd branch, except for a short stub used for stabling banking engines, which remained until 1 March 1964.

The line was singled above Gellyrhaidd Junction on 9 September 1963, and south from there to Mwyndy Junction on 3 October 1965.

The Cambrian Colliery at Clydach Vale closed on 31 March 1967 and the line above Coed Ely Colliery was closed on 2 April 1967, the line up to that point being operated as a long siding. The Mwyndy branch from Maesaraul Junction was closed on 7 October 1968.

The last revenue earning train left Coed Ely colliery on 4 October 1983, (Note: Chapman; Barrie and Baughan say total closure above Mwyndy Junction from 30 November 1983.) although a special railway enthusiasts' train was allowed to use the line on 31 March 1984. When Cwm Colliery closed on 2 March 1987 the Maesaraul stub which connected the former L&TVJR line was closed, after 2 March 1987, although an enthusiasts' special train ran on 11 April 1987.

== Llantrisant locomotive depot ==
There was a locomotive depot at Llantrisant. The original EVR depot was close to the station, but in 1900 this was replaced by a new depot on the eastern side of the line between the station and Mwyndy Junction; this was built to the specifications of William Dean, the GWR Locomotive Superintendent. The stone-built locomotive shed measured 50 by 125 feet (15 m × 38 m); it had a northlight roof, and contained three tracks for the stabling of locomotives. Alongside this were the depot offices, measuring 15 ft × 45 ft (4.6 m × 13.7 m), and the stores, measuring 15 ft × 80 ft (4.6 m × 24.4 m). The coal stage measured 30 ft × 16 ft (9.1 m × 4.9 m) and also carried a water tank with a capacity of 22,500 imperial gallons (102,000 L). There was also a turntable, a sand drier and some sidings. Access to the depot complex was provided at both ends, although locomotives could not run direct from the station to Mwyndy Junction via the depot without a double reversal.

Like Tondu depot to the west, Llantrisant depot was within the Newport division, so locomotives requiring attention which was beyond the capabilities of their equipment would be sent to Ebbw Junction depot at Newport, which was the main shed for the division. In the 1910s, the GWR introduced depot codes, and Llantrisant was coded "LTS"; these letters were painted on the locomotives, at first inside the cab, but later on towards the front of the locomotive on the framing. A separate code for accountancy purposes was introduced in 1932, and under this system, Llantrisant depot was no. 86; the last digit "6" denoting the Newport division. In February 1950, British Railways decided to use the depot coding method of the former London, Midland and Scottish Railway, and so Llantrisant was allocated code 86D, the figures 86 denoting the Newport division. This was altered to 88G in October 1960, the figures 88 denoting the Cardiff division; the main depot for the division becoming Cardiff (Canton) at the same time.

In January 1938, there were 23 locomotives allocated to Llantrisant; at the end of 1947, 15 steam locomotives were allocated there, plus one Diesel railcar; there were 19 in 1950, and 16 in 1959. Locomotive classes allocated to the shed included members of the 455 class (2-4-0T), the 1400 class (0-4-2T), the 4200 class (2-8-0T) and the 5700 class (0-6-0PT). In addition to these, there was no. 1205, a former Alexandra Docks & Railway 2-6-2T built in 1920, which was used as the Llantrisant shed pilot. The depot closed in October 1964.

== Topography ==
- Ely Valley Junction; divergence from main line;
- Mwyndy Junction; divergence of line to Mwyndy and Brofiscin;
- Llantrisant Common Junction; convergence of Llantrisant and Taff Vale Junction Railway;
- Coed Ely; opened 13 July 1925; closed 9 June 1958;
- Gellyrhaidd Junction; divergence of Hendreforgan line;
- Tonyrefail; opened 1 May 1901; closed 9 June 1958;
- Penygraig; opened 1 May 1901; renamed Penygraig and Tonypandy 1911 to 1925; closed 9 June 1958;
- Clydach Vale;
- end of line.
