= Great Western Railway absorbed locomotives =

Rolling stock of various British railways merged into GWR

Great Western Railway absorbed locomotives gives details of Great Western Railway absorbed locomotives which do not yet have individual pages.

== The grouping ==
Under the terms of the Railways Act 1921, the Great Western Railway (GWR) amalgamated with six companies – the "constituent companies" - and absorbed a large number of others – the "subsidiary companies". All of the constituent companies and ten of the subsidiary companies owned locomotives, ranging from the Taff Vale Railway which had 275 locomotives (one of which was not taken into GWR stock), to the Cleobury Mortimer and Ditton Priors Light Railway and the Gwendreath Valleys Railway, with just two each. The constituent companies were amalgamated on 1 January 1922, some of the subsidiary companies being absorbed on the same date, the rest following at intervals until July 1923. Two more undertakings, not mentioned in the Act, which were responsible for shunting at Swansea Docks, sold their locomotives to the GWR soon afterwards.

Company	Status	Date	Locomotives	Notes
Alexandra (Newport and South Wales) Docks and Railway	Constituent	1 January 1922	39	
Barry Railway	Constituent	1 January 1922	148	
Cambrian Railways	Constituent	1 January 1922	99	
Cardiff Railway	Constituent	1 January 1922	36	
Rhymney Railway	Constituent	1 January 1922	123	
Taff Vale Railway	Constituent	1 January 1922	274	
Brecon and Merthyr Tydfil Junction Railway	Subsidiary	1 July 1922	47	
Burry Port and Gwendraeth Valley Railway	Subsidiary	1 July 1922	15	
Cleobury Mortimer and Ditton Priors Light Railway	Subsidiary	1 January 1922	2	
Gwendreath Valleys Railway	Subsidiary	1 January 1923	2	
Llanelly and Mynydd Mawr Railway	Subsidiary	1 January 1923	8	
Midland and South Western Junction Railway	Subsidiary	1 July 1923	29	
Neath and Brecon Railway	Subsidiary	1 July 1922	15	
Port Talbot Railway and Docks Company	Subsidiary	1 January 1922	22	
Rhondda and Swansea Bay Railway	Subsidiary	1 January 1922	37	
South Wales Mineral Railway	Subsidiary	1 January 1923	5	
Powlesland and Mason		1 January 1924	9	
Swansea Harbour Trust		1 July 1923	14	

== Alexandra (Newport and South Wales) Docks and Railway ==
Thirty-nine locomotives acquired by the GWR on 1 January 1922.

Type	Quantity	Nos.	Builder	Year	GWR Nos.	Notes
0-4-0ST	1	Trojan	Avonside Engine Company	1897	1340	Acquired 1903
0-4-0ST	1	Alexandra	Avonside Engine Company	1898	1341	Acquired 1903
0-4-2T	1	14	GWR Wolverhampton	1877	1426	GWR 517 Class
0-6-0ST	5	1 to 5	Robert Stephenson & Company	1898–1900	674–678	

== Brecon and Merthyr Tydfil Junction Railway ==
Forty-seven locomotives were acquired by the GWR on 1 July 1922

Brecon and Merthyr Tydfil Junction Railway locomotives inherited by the GWR
Type	Quantity	Nos.	Builder	Year	GWR Nos.	Notes
0-6-0ST	2	17–18	Sharp, Stewart & Co.	1881	2190–1	
0-6-0ST	12	1–8, 13–16	Robert Stephenson & Co.; John Fowler & Co.	1884–86	2177–88	
2-4-0T	5	9–12, 25	Robert Stephenson & Co.	1888–89, 1898	1402/12/52/8/60	
0-6-2ST	4	19, 20/3/6	Vulcan Foundry	1894, 1905	1674/7/92, 1833	
0-6-0ST	5	22, 24, 27–29	Kitson & Co; Nasmyth, Wilson & Co.	1896, 1900	2169–73	
0-6-0ST	3	32–34	Swindon Works	1886–87	1685/93/4	Ex-GWR 1661 Class, acquired 1906–07
0-6-2T	8	36–43	Robert Stephenson & Co.	1909–10, 1914	11, 21, 332, 504, 698, 888, 1084, 1113	
4-4-2T	1	44	Beyer Peacock & Co	1879	1391	Ex-LSWR 46 class, acquired 1914
0-6-2T	6	45–50	Robert Stephenson & Co.	1915, 1921	1372–5, 1668/70	
0-6-0T	1	35	Kerr, Stuart & Co.	1917	2161	Ex-Railway Operating Division, acquired 1920

== Burry Port and Gwendraeth Valley Railway ==
Fifteen locomotives were acquired by the GWR on 1 July 1922

Burry Port and Gwendraeth Valley Railway locomotives inherited by the GWR
Type	Quantity	Nos.	Builder	Year	GWR Nos.	Notes
0-6-0ST	2	1, 3	Chapman and Furneaux	1900–01	2192–3	
0-6-0ST	4	4–7	Avonside Engine Company	1903–07	2194–6, 2176	
0-6-0T	9	8–12, 2, 15, 13, 14	Hudswell Clarke	1909–19	2197, 2163, 2198, 2164/5/2/8/6/7	

No. 2164 was withdrawn in 1929, and no. 2163 in 1944; the remaining thirteen were passed on to British Railways, being withdrawn between 1951 and 1959.

== Cambrian Railways ==
Ninety-nine locomotives were acquired by the GWR on 1 January 1922, including five narrow gauge: three on the Vale of Rheidol Railway, and two on the Welshpool and Llanfair Light Railway:

Number	Name	Builder	Wheel arr.	Year built	Notes
1	Edward VII	Davies & Metcalfe	2-6-2T	1902	Re-numbered 1212 in 1922. Overhauled by the GWR in 1925 and gained traditional Swindon fittings. Saw very little use following the arrival of the 3 new locomotives. In 1932 1212 moved to Swindon works The official withdrawal date is given as 9 March 1935. It was scrapped shortly afterwards.
2	Prince of Wales	Davies & Metcalfe	2-6-2T	1902	Renumbered 1213 in 1922. Sent to Swindon works in 1924 and scrapped. The number was immediately re-used for the new locomotive 1213 (now No 9) as part of the pretence of a heavy overhaul of the original locomotive.
3	Rheidol	Bagnall	2-4-0T	1896	Renumbered 1198 by the GWR in 1923 but withdrawn and scrapped the following year, having never carried its GWR number.

Type	Quantity	Nos.	Builder	Year	GWR Nos.	Notes
0-6-0T	2	WLLR 1 The Earl and 2 Countess	Beyer, Peacock & Company		822 and 823	

== Cleobury Mortimer and Ditton Priors Light Railway ==
Two locomotives were acquired by the GWR on 1 January 1922

Type	Quantity	Nos.	Builder	Year	GWR Nos.	Notes
0-6-0ST	2	Cleobury and Burwarton	Manning Wardle	1908	28 and 29	Both rebuilt as 0-6-0PT

== Gwendreath Valleys Railway ==
Two 0-6-0ST locomotives were acquired by the GWR on 1 January 1923. One was given the GWR number 26, but the second (Margret) was sold in 1923 without being allocated a GWR number.

== Llanelly and Mynydd Mawr Railway ==
Eight locomotives acquired by the GWR on 1 January 1923

- 312 Andrew Barclay 0-6-0T, George Waddell
- 339 Hudswell Clarke 0-6-0T, Tarndune
- 803 Hudswell Clarke 0-6-0T, Ravelston
- 937 Hudswell Clarke 0-6-0T, Merkland
- 359 Hudswell Clarke 0-6-0ST, Hilda
- 704 Manning Wardle 0-6-0T, Victory
- 944 Avonside Engine Company 0-6-0T, Great Mountain
- 969 Fox, Walker and Company 0-6-0ST, Seymour Clarke

== Rhondda and Swansea Bay Railway ==
Thirty-seven locomotives acquired by the GWR on 1 January 1922

- 164 - 179, 181 Kitson 0-6-2T
- 180, 182 Robert Stephenson & Company 0-6-2T ex Port Talbot Railway
- 728, 1167, 1652, 1660 ex-GWR 1076 Class 0-6-0ST
- 789, 801, 802, 805, 806 Beyer, Peacock & Company 0-6-0T
- 1307, 1309, 1310 Kitson 2-4-2T
- 1710, 1756 ex-GWR 1701 Class 0-6-0ST
- 1825, 1834 ex-GWR 1813 Class 0-6-0ST
- 2756 ex-GWR 2721 Class 0-6-0ST

== South Wales Mineral Railway ==
Five locomotives acquired by the GWR on 1 January 1923

- 817 - 818 ex-South Devon Railway Buffalo class 0-6-0ST
- 1546, 1806, 1811 ex-GWR 645 Class 0-6-0ST

== Taff Vale Railway ==
275 locomotives were acquired by the GWR on 1 January 1922

Taff Vale Railway locomotives inherited by the GWR
Class	Wheels	Introduced	Final TVR nos.	Quantity	First GWR nos.	To BR	Extinct	Notes	Ref
A	0-6-2T	1914	3, 7, 10–12, 20, 42/5, 52, 75, 80, 90/1, 120/2–5/7–130/2–6/8–140/4/9, 154/6–160/2/4/5, 400–416	58	335/7, 343–9, 351/2/6/7, 360–2/4–8, 370–391/3/4/7–9, 401–4/6/8, 438–441	58	1957	GWR nos. 401 up allotted 303–9, 312/6, 322 in 1946, renumbered 1947–50	
C	4-4-2T	1888	170–5	6	1301–6	—	1927		
D	0-6-0ST	1865	250, 270	2	797/8	—	1926		
E	0-6-0ST	1873	264–5	2	795/6	—	1927		
H	0-6-0T	1884	141–3	3	792–4	3	1953	Renumbered 193–5 during 1948/49	
I	4-4-0T	1884	285–7	3	999, 1133, 1184	—	1925		
K & L	0-6-0	1874	210/7/9, 220, 235/6/9, 242/5, 252/3/9, 261, 281/3/4/8, 297/8, 301/2/4, 313–6, 320/2/5/7/8, 335–7/9, 340, 354/6–360	42	912–933/5/6/8/9, 941–4/6/8, 968–970/4/8, 984, 1000–2	—	1930	43 withdrawn 1907–20	
M & M1	0-6-2T	1885	4, 5, 14–16, 22/4, 50/1/3/4, 71/4, 86–89, 145–8, 150–3, 163/6–9, 176–181, 344/9, 362/4/5	41	442–5, 462/6, 478, 481–4/7–493, 503/5–8, 511/3/5/6, 520, 552, 560/7, 573/7–580/2–6	—	1934		
N	0-6-2T	1891	106/7, 182–9	10	485/6, 494–6, 498–502	—	1934		
O	0-6-2T	1894	21/5/6, 33/4, 190	6	446–8, 452/3, 581	—	1930		
O1	0-6-2T	1894	27–29, 37, 41, 60–65, 70/3/8	14	449–451/4/5, 471–7/9, 480	—	1931		
O2	0-6-2T	1899	31/2, 44, 66, 81–5	9	412/3/5/9, 421/3–6	—	1928		
O3	0-6-2T	1902	18/9, 47, 55/7, 92/3/6, 103, 117, 126, 131/7, 155, 161	15	410/1/6–8, 427–35/7	2	1948	Nos. 410/1 to BR	
O4	0-6-2T	1907	1, 2, 6, 8, 9, 13/7, 35/6/8/9, 43/6/8/9, 56/8/9, 67–9, 94/5/7/8, 101/2/4/5/8–116/8/9, 121	41	236, 278–302, 310/1/3–5/7–321/4, 333, 409, 414, 420	41	1955	Nos. 300 up allotted 200–211, 215–220 in 1946; except for 301/2, 314 these were renumbered in 1946–50.	
S & T	0-4-0ST	1876	266/7	2	1342/3	—	1926		
U & U1	0-6-2T	1895	23, 30, 40, 72/6/7/9, 191–198	15	587–593/5–600/2/3	—	1931		
V	0-6-0ST	1899	99, 100, 275, 280, 290/1	6	786–791	—	1930		

== See also ==
- GWR 0-4-0ST
- Welsh 0-6-2T locomotives
- Locomotives of the Great Western Railway
