= Brecon and Merthyr 0-6-2T locomotives =

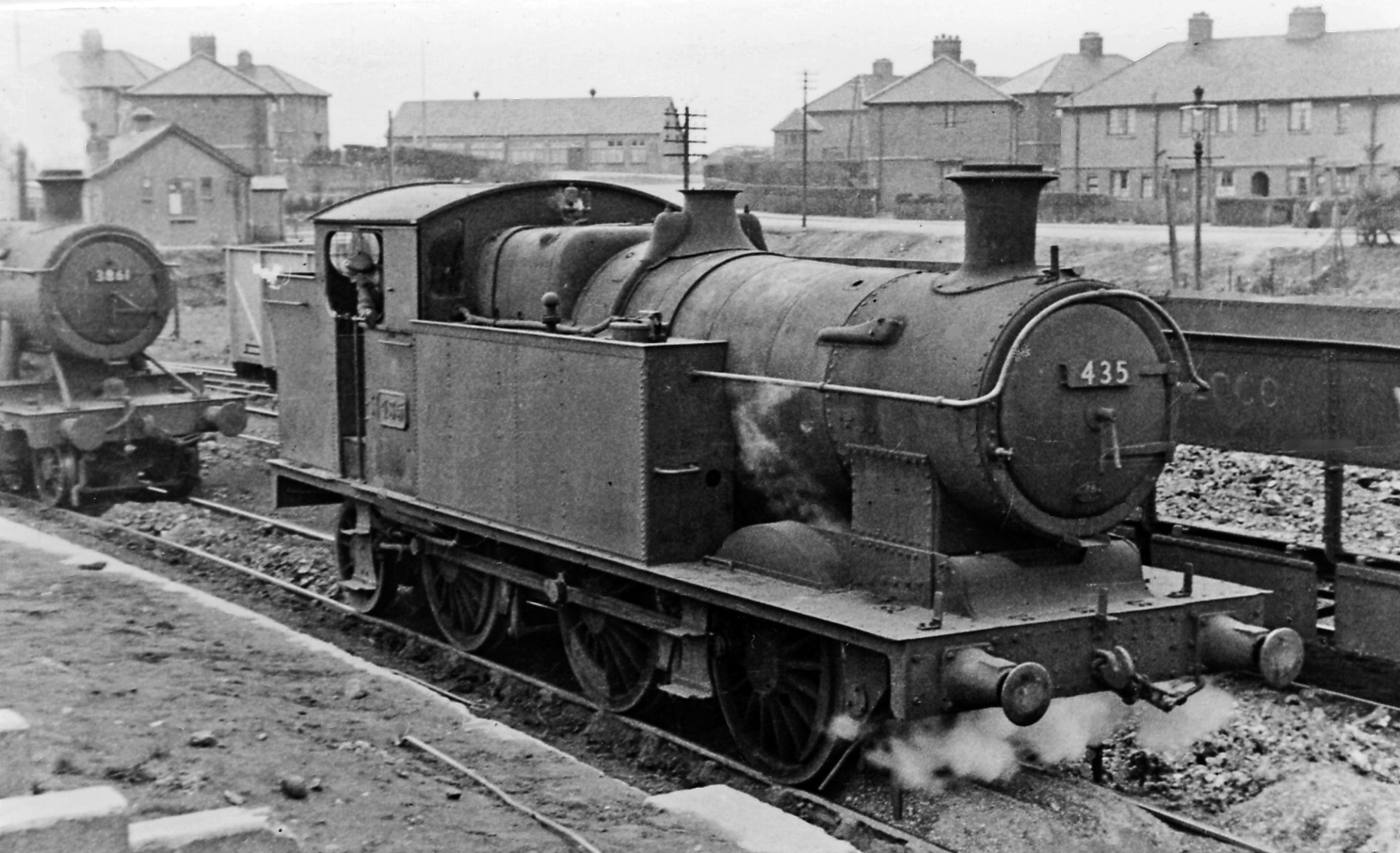
B&M No. 49 at Ebbw Junction Depot 1951

Brecon and Merthyr 0-6-2T locomotives were steam tank locomotives of the Brecon and Merthyr Railway including classes 36 and 45.

The Brecon and Merthyr 36 was a class of 0-6-2T steam locomotive introduced into traffic in 1909 from a design by the Rhymney Railway's engineer Hurry Riches. There were initially four locos in the class augmented to eight in 1914. They were built by Robert Stephenson and Company and were almost identical to the successful Rhymney Railway R class excepting a round-topped boiler. When rebuilt by the GWR they acquired GWR Belpaire boilers.

The B & M also borrowed from the Rhymney Railway P class for six more engines in two batches of three in 1915 and 1920 loosely known as the 45 class.

== Overview of similar classes ==
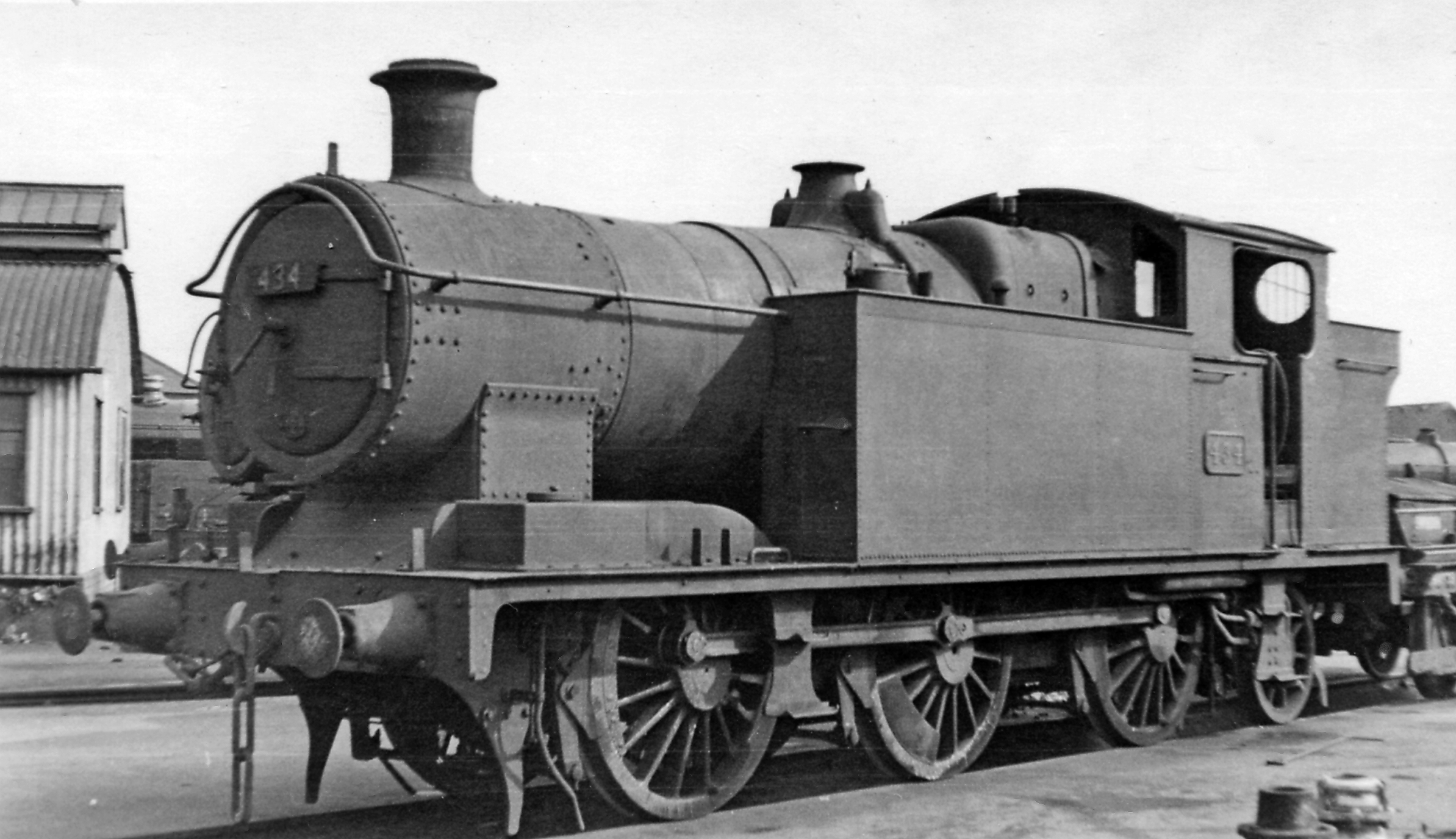
No. 434, built as B&M No. 48 in 1921, acquired by the GWR in 1922 as No. 1375 and renumbered 434 by 1950, 25 April 1954.

In similar vein, the Neath and Brecon Railway used the Rhymney Railway's Stephensons as a blueprint for three locomotives (known as the Neath and Brecon Stephensons) built in 1904 to the design of the Rhymney Railway M class.

The Rhymney Railway R class and related 1904-introduced Rhymney Railway M class and 1910 Rhymney Railway A class were successful designs ideally suited to hauling heavy coal trains a relatively short distance. In 1924, Nos 36 & 38 were reboilered by the GWR and in this form were visually almost indistinguishable from the GWR 5600 Class. All but two of the fourteen B & M Stephensons were eventually rebuilt, the last as late as 1947.

Thus the 36 (and larger wheeled 45 class) were designed for work on the Brecon and Merthyr, replacing smaller locomotives. When the smaller railway companies were forcibly merged into the GWR, these 0-6-2T's were in generally good order and had proved successful. Collectively the sixty-five various permutations of the Rhymney Stephensons became the blueprint for the 200 strong 56xx class.

The design of the 56xx followed the Rhymney/Brecon and Merthyr/Neath and Brecon designs quite closely, but adopted GWR practice as far as possible, by utilising many standardized parts. Included in Collett's innovations was a standard number 2 boiler which was suitable for the 5600 (and the M and R class Rhymney locomotives and the B & M 36 class), complete with the traditional copper GWR safety valve casing and copper-capped chimney. Some Rhymney A and P classes were also rebuilt but used the slightly shorter standard number 10 boiler, also to good effect.

These were substantial sized tank engines, and weighed 66tons (62 tons after rebuilding) and were 36' 8" in length.

They had long lives, extended by the rebuilding. The first withdrawal was in 1947 and the last in 1954.

== Dimensions ==
- B & M 36 class, see Rhymney Railway R class
- B & M 45 class, see Rhymney Railway P class

== Welsh 0-6-2T types ==
The railways of South Wales seem to have had a particular liking for the 0-6-2T type. This was because the nature of the work they undertook demanded high adhesive weight, plenty of power with good braking ability, but no need for outright speed, nor large tanks or bunker as the distances from pit to port were short. These Welsh locomotives were taken over by the GWR at the grouping in 1923 and many including seventeen of the Rhymney A, M, P and R's were rebuilt with GWR taper boilers. All the Rhymney Stephenson-derived locos passed into British Railways (BR) ownership in 1948. Others included (with some gaps in numbering):

- Brecon and Merthyr Railway, BR numbers 431–436
- Cardiff Railway, BR number 155
- Rhymney Railway, BR numbers 35–83
- Taff Vale Railway, BR numbers 204–399

For further information on these pre-grouping locomotives see Locomotives of the Great Western Railway.

== See also ==
- Welsh 0-6-2T locomotives
