= Taff Vale Railway A class =

Class of 58 British 0-6-2T locomotives

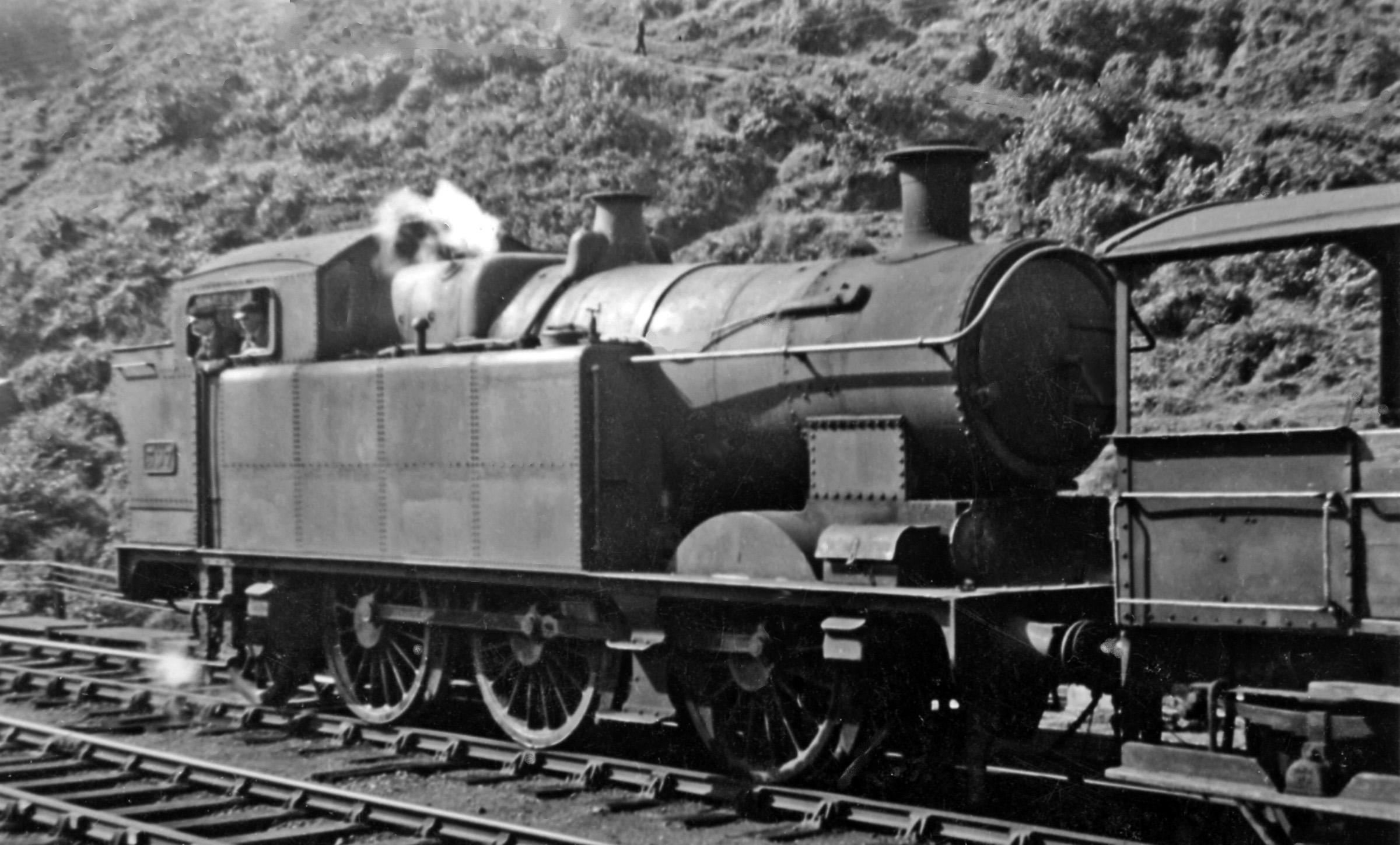
- Class 'A' No. 397 at Abercynon 1946 (rebuilt with GWR boiler)
Type and origin
- Power type: Steam
- Designer: John Cameron
- Builder: Hawthorn Leslie & Co. (27); Nasmyth, Wilson & Co. (12); North British Locomotive Co. (6); Vulcan Foundry (13)
- Build date: 1914–1921, rebuilt 1924
- Total produced: 58
Specifications
- Configuration
  - Whyte: 0-6-2T
- Gauge: 4 ft 8 1/2 in (1,435 mm) standard gauge
- Driver dia.: 5 ft 3 in (1.600 m)
- Loco weight: 65.70 long tons (66.75 t; 73.58 short tons)
- Fuel type: Coal
- Boiler pressure: As built: 175 psi (1.21 MPa); Rebuilt: 200 psi (1.38 MPa)
- Cylinders: Two, inside
- Cylinder size: As built: 18 in × 26 in (457 mm × 660 mm); Rebuilt: 17.5 in × 26 in (444 mm × 660 mm)
Performance figures
- Tractive effort: As built: 21,000 lbf (93.4 kN); Rebuilt: 21,480 lbf (95.5 kN)
Career
- Power class: BR: 4P
- Retired: 1952–1957
- Disposition: All scrapped

The Taff Vale Railway A class was a class of 0-6-2T steam tank locomotives designed by J. Cameron for mixed traffic work and introduced to the Taff Vale Railway (TVR) in 1914. The A class was an enlarged version of the TVR O4 class designed by Tom Hurry Riches in 1907. The A class was the last new class of locomotive to be introduced on the TVR, which had introduced its first 0-6-2Ts in 1885 (the M class); and, with a total of 58 built, was numerically the largest class of tank locomotive on the TVR.

Previous classes of mixed-traffic 0-6-2T on the TVR (the M, M1, N, O, O1, O2, O3 and O4 classes) had used driving wheels of 4 ft 6 in (1.37 m) or 4 ft 6 1/2 in (1.384 m) diameter; but the A class used the same diameter as the TVR's passenger 0-6-2T (U and U1 classes), i.e. 5 ft 3 in (1.60 m), and they were used mainly on passenger trains.

The first 51 locomotives initially had boilers working at a pressure of 160 pounds per square inch (1,100 kPa), which (except for no. 120) was later altered to 175 psi (1,210 kPa); the last seven worked at the higher pressure from new. By the time that the TVR amalgamated with the Great Western Railway (GWR) at the start of 1922, only four (TVR nos. 3, 42, 52 and 120) still worked at the original pressure. All of the A class locomotives were rebuilt with taper boilers and superheaters by the GWR between 1924 and 1932; these also worked at 175 psi (1,210 kPa) at first. The pressure was raised to 200 psi (1,380 kPa) between 1930 and 1939; at the same time, the cylinder bore was reduced from 18 1/2 inches (470 mm) to 17 1/2 in (440 mm). All 58 passed to British Railways (BR) in 1948, until the introduction of the BR 82xxx 2-6-2Ts in the mid-1950s, these engines were widely used on passenger workings in the South Wales Valleys.

After withdrawal, several were employed as Works Pilots in Swindon before being broken up. The first loco withdrawn was 344 in November 1952 from Cardiff Cathays shed. The last seven locos 370, 373, 381, 383, 390, 398 and 402 were withdrawn together in August 1957 from Abercynon shed. None are preserved.

== Builders and numbering ==
The locomotives were built in several batches by Hawthorn Leslie, Nasmyth, Wilson and Company, Vulcan Foundry and North British Locomotive Company. Their initial GWR numbers were in the ranges 335–408 (for locos working at a boiler pressure of 175 psi (1,210 kPa)) and 438–441 (pressure 160 psi (1,100 kPa)), but they were not consecutive and were intermingled with other classes. Those with numbers above 399 were renumbered between 303 and 322 during 1947–50.

List of TVR A class locomotive orders
Year	Quantity	Manufacturer	Serial numbers	TVR Numbers	GWR Numbers	Notes
1914	6	Hawthorn Leslie	3057–3062	3, 7, 10, 11, 12, 120	438, 335, 337, 343, 344, 441	441 renumbered 322 in 1947, 438 renumbered 309 in 1949
1915	6	North British Locomotive Co.	21156–21161	42, 45, 52, 122, 123, 124	439, 346, 440, 352, 356, 357	439 and 440 renumbered 312 and 316 in 1949 and 1950 respectively
1916	6	Vulcan Foundry	3178–3183	125, 127, 128, 129, 130, 132	360, 361, 362, 364, 365, 366	
1919	12	Nasmyth, Wilson & Co.	1269–1280	133, 135, 136, 138, 139, 140, 154, 156, 157, 158, 159, 160	367, 370, 371, 372, 373, 374, 377, 378, 379, 380, 381, 382	
1920	16	Hawthorn Leslie	3394–3409	20, 134, 144, 149, 162, 164, 165, 400 to 408	345, 368, 375, 376, 383 to 391, 393, 394, 397	
1921	5	Hawthorn Leslie	3410–3414	409 to 413	398, 399, 401 to 403	401 and 403 renumbered 303 and 305 in 1947, 402 renumbered 304 in 1948
1914	7	Vulcan Foundry	3492–3498	75, 80, 90, 91, 414 to 416	347 to 349, 351, 404, 406, 408	404, 406, and 408 renumbered 306 to 308 in 1949, 1949 and 1948 respectively

Originally, the Taff Vale Railway commissioned the German locomotive factory Hannoversche Maschinenbau AG to build six locomotives in 1914. However, due to the outbreak of the First World War, the deal did not come into being. The order for these six locomotives was transferred to North British and they were delivered as nos. 42 etc. during 1915.

== See also ==
- Welsh 0-6-2T locomotives
- Locomotives of the Great Western Railway

== Sources ==
- ABC of British Railways Locomotives; part 1. Ian Allan. Winter 1957–1958. p. 22.
