= Neath and Brecon Stephensons =

The Neath and Brecon Stephensons were 0-6-2T tank locomotives introduced into traffic on the Neath and Brecon Railway in 1904 from a Rhymney Railway design. There were three locos in the class. They were built by Robert Stephenson and Company and were almost identical to the successful Rhymney Railway M class.

== Overview of similar classes ==
In similar vein, the Brecon and Merthyr Railway used the Rhymney Railway's Stephensons as a blueprint for locomotives (Brecon and Merthyr 0-6-2T locomotives) built from 1909 to the design of the Rhymney Railway R class.

The M class and related 1910 introduced R and A class were successful designs ideally suited to hauling heavy coal trains a relatively short distance. In 1922 the three Neath and Brecon locos were repaired by the GWR and lasted until 1929–1930.

== Welsh 0-6-2T types ==
The railways of South Wales seem to have had a particular liking for the 0-6-2T type. This was because the nature of the work they undertook demanded high adhesive weight, plenty of power with good braking ability, but no need for outright speed, nor large tanks or bunker as the distances from pit to port were short. These Welsh locomotives were taken over by the GWR at the grouping in 1923 and many (but not the N & B locos) were rebuilt with GWR taper boilers. All the similar Rhymney Stevenson derived locos passed into British Railways (BR) ownership in 1948. Others included (with some gaps in numbering):

- Brecon and Merthyr Railway, BR numbers 431–436
- Cardiff Railway, BR number 155
- Rhymney Railway, BR numbers 35–83
- Taff Vale Railway, BR numbers 204–399

For further information on these pre-grouping locomotives see Locomotives of the Great Western Railway.

== See also ==
- Welsh 0-6-2T locomotives
