= O4 =

O4 may refer to:

- LNER Class O4, a class of ex-Great Central Railway 2-8-0 steam tender locomotives
- Taff Vale Railway O4 class, a class of 0-6-2T steam tank locomotives
- USS O-4 (SS-65), a 1917 United States O class submarine
- O-4, the pay grade for the following officer ranks in the U.S. uniformed services:
  - Major in the Army, Marine Corps, Air Force, and Space Force
  - Lieutenant Commander in the Navy, Coast Guard, Public Health Service Commissioned Corps, and NOAA Commissioned Officer Corps
- Tetraoxygen (O_{4}), oxozone
- a class of stars in the stellar classification
- Otoyol 4, a highway from Istanbul to Ankara, Turkey
- Martin XO-4, an observation aircraft proposed by the Glenn L. Martin Company
- O(4), the orthogonal group in dimension 4

== See also ==
- 04 (disambiguation)
- 4O (disambiguation)
