= 04 =

04 may refer to:

- The year 2004, or any year ending with 04
- The month of April
- 4 (number)
- 04 (Six by Seven album)
- 04 (Urban Zakapa album)
- 04, department number of Alpes-de-Haute-Provence, France
- Several German football teams, including:
  - Bayer 04 Leverkusen
  - FC Ingolstadt 04
  - 1. FC Neubrandenburg 04
  - FC Schalke 04
- Mobile phones in Australia (prefix 04)

== See also ==
- O4 (disambiguation)
