= 4O =

4O or 4-O may refer to:

- Quarto (4° or 4o), a format of a book
- 4 Degrees and Beyond International Climate Conference, 2009
- Quaternary sector of the economy (4o Sector)
- Air Montenegro (IATA code: 4O), the flag carrier of Montenegro
- Interjet (former IATA code: 4O), a former Mexican airline
- 2007 Rally d'Italia Sardegna (4º Supermag Rally Italia Sardinia)
- GPT-4o, a large language model developed by OpenAI

== See also ==
- Fourth (disambiguation) (4º)
- 4° (disambiguation)
- O4 (disambiguation)
- 40
