= 4° =

4° may refer to:

- 4°, or Quarto a book or pamphlet produced from full 'blanksheets', each of which is printed with eight pages of text, four to a side
- 4°, a reference to a 4-degrees Celsius increase in the global average temperature due to climate change, 4 Degrees and Beyond International Climate Conference
- "4°", the third single by the progressive rock band Tool from their 1993 album Undertow
- "4 Degrees", the first single by experimental pop singer Anohni from her 2016 album Hopelessness

== See also ==
- 4O (disambiguation)
