= GWR 5600 Class =

Steam locomotive

Great Western Railway 5600 class
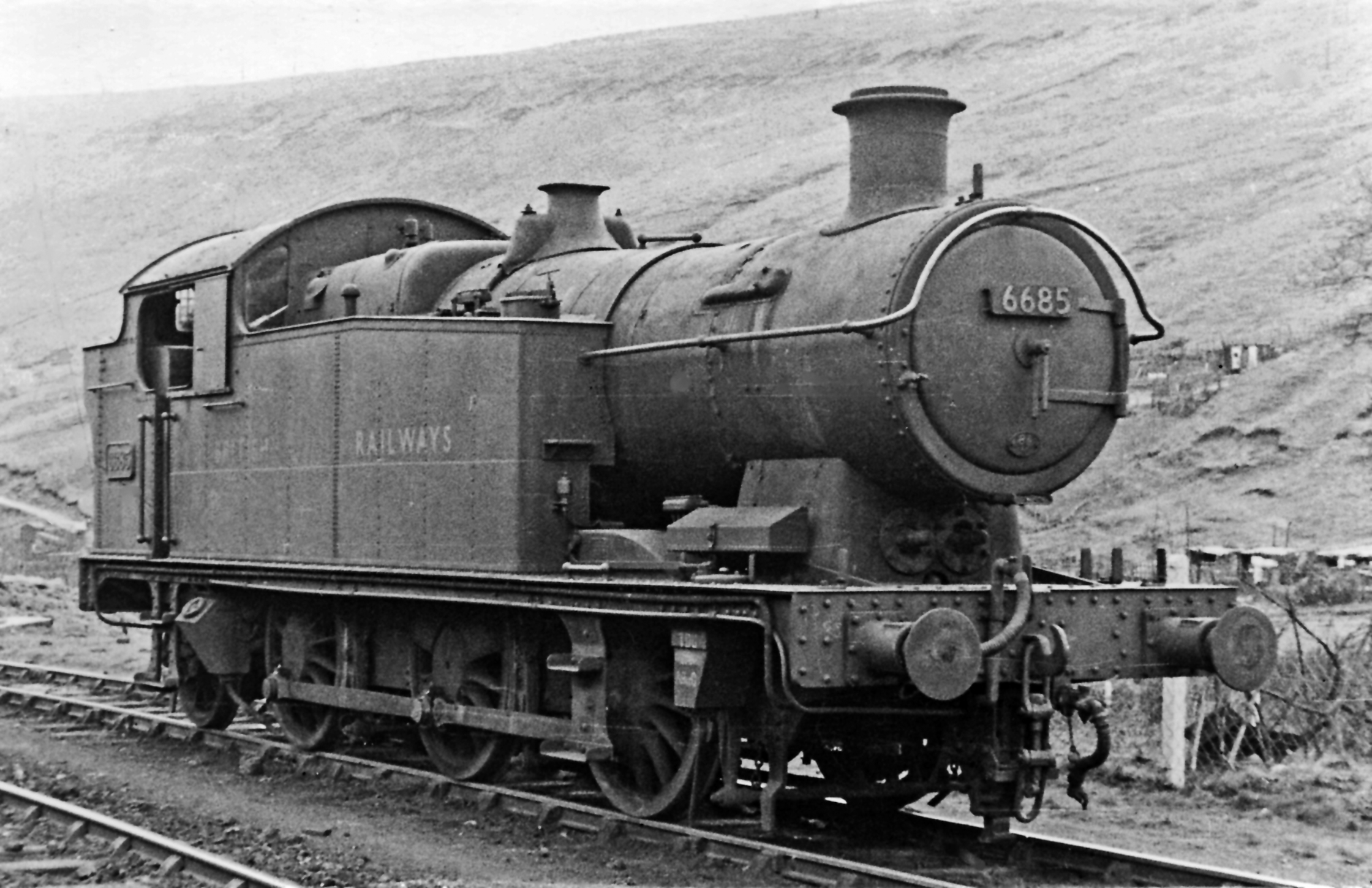
- 6685 at Aberbeeg locomotive depot in April 1951.
Type and origin
- Power type: Steam
- Designer: Charles B. Collett
- Builder: GWR Swindon Works (150); Armstrong Whitworth (50)
- Order number: 228, 235, 244, 252, 255
- Serial number: AW: 938–987
- Build date: 1924–1928
- Total produced: 200
Specifications
- Configuration
  - Whyte: 0-6-2T
  - UIC: C1′ h2t
- Gauge: 4 ft 8 1/2 in (1,435 mm) standard gauge
- Driver dia.: 4 ft 7 1/2 in (1.410 m)
- Trailing dia.: 3 ft 8 in (1.118 m)
- Loco weight: 5600: 68 long tons 12 cwt (153,700 lb or 69.7 t); 6600: 69 long tons 7 cwt (155,300 lb or 70.5 t)
- Fuel type: Coal
- Fuel capacity: 3.75 long tons (3.81 t; 4.20 short tons)
- Water cap.: 1,900 imp gal (8,600 L; 2,300 US gal)
- Boiler: GWR Standard No. 2
- Boiler pressure: 200 psi (1.38 MPa)
- Superheater: Yes
- Cylinders: Two, inside
- Cylinder size: 18 in × 26 in (457 mm × 660 mm)
- Valve gear: Stephenson's
- Valve type: piston valves
Performance figures
- Tractive effort: 25,800 lbf (115 kN)
Career
- Operators: Great Western Railway; British Railways
- Class: 5600
- Power class: GWR: D BR: 5MT
- Numbers: 5600–5699, 6600–6699
- Axle load class: Red
- Withdrawn: 1962–1966
- Disposition: 9 preserved, remainder scrapped

The GWR 5600 Class is a class of 0-6-2T steam locomotive built between 1924 and 1928. They were designed by Charles Collett for the Great Western Railway (GWR), and were introduced into traffic in 1924. After the 1923 grouping, Swindon inherited a large and varied collection of locomotives from historic Welsh railway companies, which did not fit into their standardisation programme. GWR boiler inspectors arrived en masse and either condemned the original locomotives or had them rebuilt. The systematic destruction of many examples of locomotives, most still in serviceable condition, followed, but others continued in service alongside the 5600s.

Two hundred GWR 5600 Class locomotives were built and remained in service until withdrawn by British Railways between 1962 and 1965. Nine of the class have survived into preservation.

== Background: Welsh 0-6-2T types ==
The railways of South Wales had long made use of the 0-6-2T type. This was because the work they undertook required high adhesive weight, high tractive effort with good braking ability, but no need for outright speed or high coal and water capacitiy as the distances from pit to port were short. The 0-6-2 configuration was found necessary to handle the sharp curves common in the area. Because of the steep gradients, the locomotives were operated facing up hill, ensuring water coverage of the firebox crown. On the loaded journey downhill speeds were at their highest, the pair of carrying wheels essential to guide the locomotive through the curves. These Welsh locomotives were taken over by the GWR at the Grouping in 1922, as follows:

Railway	Quantity	GWR numbers
Alexandra (Newport and South Wales) Docks and Railway	4	190–2, 663
Barry Railway	72	193–201/3/4/6–214, 223–235/8, 240–277
Brecon and Merthyr Tydfil Junction Railway (B&M)	18	11, 21, 332, 504, 698, 888, 1084, 1113, 1372–5, 1668/70/4/7/92, 1833
Cardiff Railway	13	151–163
Neath and Brecon Railway	5	1114/7, 1277, 1327/71
Port Talbot Railway and Docks Company	7	183–189
Rhondda and Swansea Bay Railway	19	164–182
Rhymney Railway	101	30–44, 46–91, 97–101, 105–110/2–5/7–9, 122/7/9/30/1/3–145/7–150
Taff Vale Railway (TVR)	209	236, 278–302, 310/1/3–5/7–321/4, 333/5/7, 343–9, 351/2/6/7, 360–2/4–8, 370–391/3/4/7–9, 401–4/6/8–421/3–435/7–455, 462/6, 471–496/8–503/5–8, 511/3/5/6, 520, 552, 560/7, 573, 577–593/5–600/2/3

Some were rebuilt with GWR taper boilers. In 1946, all of the surviving B&M locomotives and several TVR locomotives were allotted new numbers, which were applied between 1946 and 1950 (although some were withdrawn before the new number could be applied). A number of them passed into British Railways (BR) ownership in 1948, including (with some gaps in numbering):

- Alexandra (Newport and South Wales) Docks and Railway, BR number 190
- Barry Railway, BR numbers 198–277
- Brecon and Merthyr Tydfil Junction Railway, BR numbers 422-436
- Cardiff Railway, BR number 155
- Port Talbot Railway and Docks, BR number 184
- Rhymney Railway, BR numbers 30-83
- Taff Vale Railway, BR numbers 200–411

Of the Taff Vale Railway, many engines continued to operate up to the 1950s, but today only two locomotives survived, TVR 'O1' No.28, the last-surviving Welsh-built engine, and TVR 'O2' No.85.

For further information on these pre-grouping locomotives see Locomotives of the Great Western Railway.

== Origins ==
When the GWR took over the Welsh valley lines, they discovered that the Welsh locomotive crews liked their 0-6-2T locomotives. Rather than a new design the 5600 Class was a "Swindonised" version of the Rhymney Railway M class and R class locomotives. The 1904 M class (and the similar 1909 R class) were successful designs ideally suited to hauling heavy coal trains a relatively short distance.

The 5600 Class was specially designed for work in South Wales, replacing the worn-out locomotives that were taken over from smaller railways in 1923. Contrary to this trend, the Rhymney Railway's more modern 0-6-2s were in generally good order and had proved successful. Thus they became the blueprint for the 56xx.

The first of five R class locos was re-boilered by the GWR in 1926 and a single M class was upgraded in 1930. In this form, both were visually almost indistinguishable from the 5600 Class.

== Design ==
The design of the 5600 Class followed Great Western Railway practice as far as possible, by utilising many standardised parts. Included in Churchward's innovations was a Standard Number 2 boiler which was suitable for the 5600 Class, and the M and R class Rhymney locomotives, complete with the traditional brass GWR safety valve casing and copper-capped chimney.

They were relatively large tank engines, 37 ft 6 in (11.43 m) in length and weighing 62 long tons (63 t; 69 short tons). The side tanks could hold 1,900 imp gal (8,600 L; 2,300 US gal) of water. The high domed cab, bunker and tanks were closely related to the 31xx and 42xx classes. One hundred of the class were built at the GWR workshops in Swindon from 1924 to 1927.

While they were powerful machines, the 5600s were very unpopular with footplate crews at the time. They were beset by numerous failures, the most common of which was hot axle boxes. They lacked the wider tolerances in their boxes that the original Welsh company locomotives had. They also had the tendency to derail, so those driving them preferred them in reverse, where the pony truck was able to guide them around tight curves. When the first batch were hastily recalled back to Swindon, Collett faced criticism from the Director of Caerphilly Works in building such a locomotive unsuited to the lines they were meant to work on.

In 1927 another 100 similar engines were constructed – these were slightly heavier and numbered in the 66xx series. Nos 6600–6649 were Swindon-built in 1927–1928, but due to the pressure of work 6650–6699 were built by Armstrong Whitworth in 1928. This resulted in some minor design differences from the Swindon locomotives, most visible were additional balance weights fitted inside the driving wheels webs opposite the crank pin to remedy the faults. When the Welsh railwaymen discovered that the new GWR 5700 Class 0-6-0 pannier tank (introduced 1929) was even more suitable for the same work – being shorter and lighter, with roughly the same (slightly lower) tractive effort – no further Class 56xx/66xx locos were built.

The 5600 Class had the distinction of being the only locomotive of 0-6-2 wheel arrangement built new by the GWR. Nevertheless, there were just over 400 locos with that wheel arrangement in service from 1940 to 1945, demonstrating the large number acquired in 1923.

Table of orders and numbers
Year	Quantity	Lot No.	Locomotive numbers	Notes
1924–25	50	228	5600–5649	
1926–27	50	235	5650–5699	
1927–28	30	244	6600–6629	
1928	20	252	6630–6649	
1928	50	255	6650–6699	Armstrong-Whitworth works nos. 938–987

== Dimensions ==
- Locomotive weight:
  - All locos, 68 tons 12 cwt
  - 5600 Class, 68 tons 12 cwt
  - 6600 Class, 69 tons 7 cwt
  - 5600 Class, 62 tons 18 cwt
  - 6600 Class, 15 cwt more than 5600

== Service ==
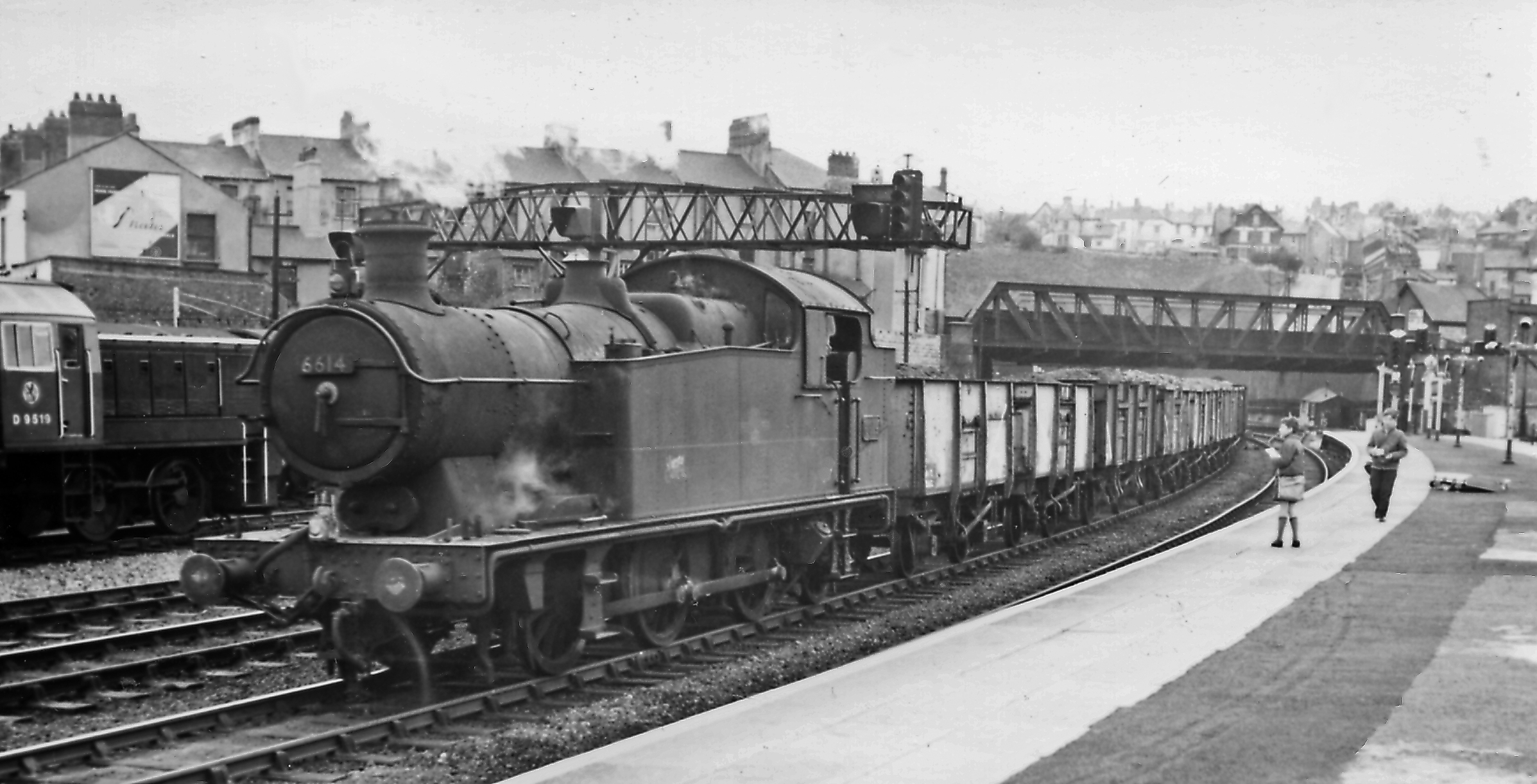
6614 with a coal train at Newport

A fall in the South Wales coal trade in the 1930s saw many of the class re-allocated to other parts of the system. Due to the stability of the design, many drivers would typically operate the 56xx class down the Welsh valleys in reverse (bunker first). The placement of the trailing wheels helped the engine enter the curves better than if operated in the other direction. Typically, during operation, when pulling a heavy load the tanks were operated bunker first, and then smokebox first on the return trips up the valleys.

All the 56xx/66xx locomotives passed into British Railways ownership at nationalisation in 1948, and all remained in service until 1962, at which time they were withdrawn from service quite rapidly, with the onset of diesel traction on BR gaining momentum. All had been retired by 1965.

== Withdrawal ==
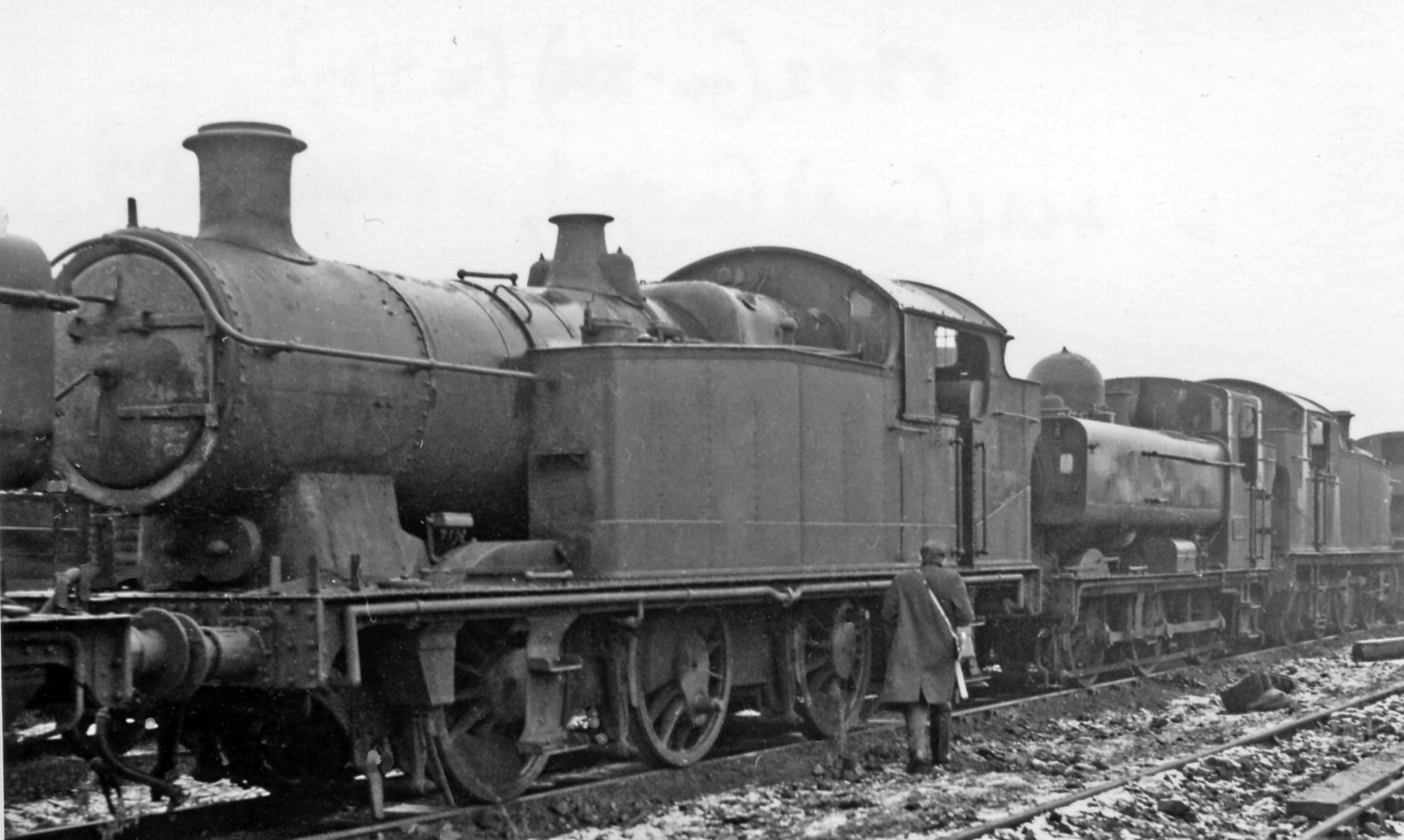
Withdrawn engines at Swindon

Withdrawn from 1962 to 1966, with nos. 5605 and 6697 being the last to go.

== Preservation ==
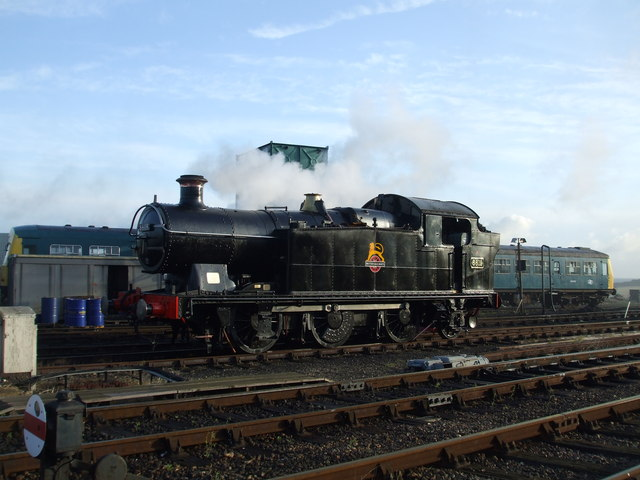
6619 in BR Black, Weybourne

Several ended up in Woodham Brothers' scrapyard in Barry, South Wales, with eight of the nine preserved engines saved from Barry. The majority of the class in preservation were built at Swindon Works, three of them: 6686, 6695 & 6697 being built by Armstrong Whitworth.

As the locomotives were operated mainly in South Wales, some railfans know the Class by the nickname "Taffy Tank"; 'Taffy' being a derogatory term for someone of Welsh descent. However, the 56xx class never had this title officially, whereas the more typical examples of the Rhymney Railway's M and R classes they replaced, were arguably the original 'Taffy Tanks' of fame.

As of 2023, six members of the class have run in preservation, with three engines currently in operation, 5668 undergoing restoration from scrapyard condition at the Kent and East Sussex Railway, 6634 and 6686 both awaiting restoration from scrapyard condition at Peak Rail and the Barry Tourist Railway respectively, and 6697 on static display at Didcot Railway Centre.

The following table lists the preserved locomotives:

Number	Builder	Built	Withdrawn	Working Life	Owner	Location	Livery	Status	Notes
5619	Swindon Works	March 1925	June 1964	39 Years, 3 months	Telford Steam Railway	Telford Steam Railway	BR Unlined Black	In service	
5637	Swindon Works	September 1925	June 1964	38 Years, 9 months	5637 Steam Locomotive Group	Swindon and Cricklade Railway	BR Lined Green	Awaiting overhaul	Permanently based at the S & CR, awaiting 10-year Heavy General Overhaul.
5643	Swindon Works	October 1925	July 1963	37 Years, 9 months	Furness Railway Trust	Ribble Steam Railway	BR Lined Green	Undergoing overhaul	Currently at its home the Ribble Steam Railway, the locomotive is currently undergoing a 10 year overhaul. It is hoped to complete the overhaul in time to allow the marking of the celebration of the centenary of the locomotive in 2025.
5668	Swindon Works	June 1926	September 1964	38 Years, 3 months	4253 Locomotive Company Ltd.	Kent and East Sussex Railway		Under restoration as of 2026	Asbestos stripped in readiness for a boiler lift.
6619	Swindon Works	January 1928	March 1963	35 Years, 1 month	6619 Ltd	Kent and East Sussex Railway	BR Unlined Black	Awaiting overhaul	Boiler ticket expired 1 January 2015.
6634	Swindon Works	August 1928	June 1964	35 Years, 8 months	Pete Waterman	Peak Rail		Under restoration	Restoration was to be undertaken by the SVR but never commenced. Moved to Rowsley in Nov 2017.
6686	Armstrong Whitworth	October 1928	June 1964	35 Years, 6 months	Vale of Glamorgan Council	Barry Tourist Railway		Under restoration	One of the Barry Ten.
6695	Armstrong Whitworth	October 1928	July 1964	35 Years, 9 months	6695 Locomotive Ltd	Avon Valley Railway	GWR Unlined Green	Operational	Withdrawn following expiry of boiler ticket in 2015. Re-entered service on the S & CR September 2022, and now stationed at the Avon Valley Railway.
6697	Armstrong Whitworth	October 1928	May 1966	37 Years, 7 months		Didcot Railway Centre	GWR Unlined Green	On static display	Only member of the class not to go through Woodham Brothers' scrapyard.
