= Welsh 0-6-2T locomotives =

Type of steam locomotive

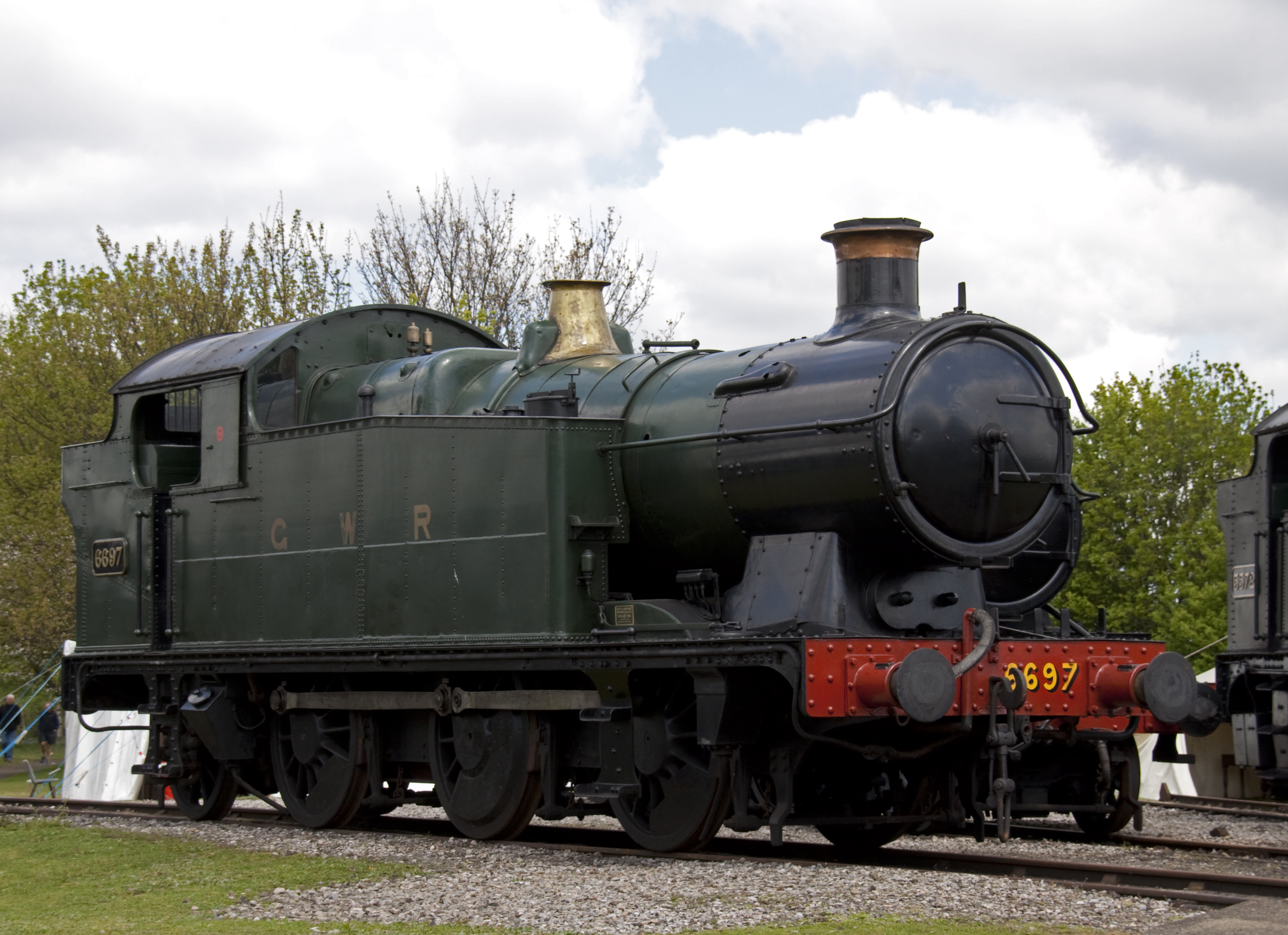
GWR 5600 Class, 6697 - a GWR development of the pre-1923 Welsh locomotives

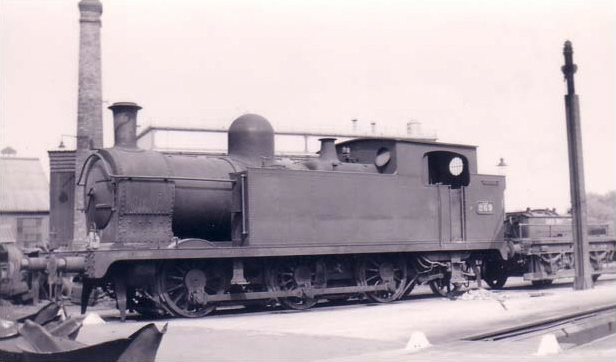
Former Barry Railway Class B1 0-6-2T at Swindon in 1950, British Railways no. 269

Welsh 0-6-2T locomotives were a standard steam locomotive of the railways of South Wales. Many of the independent railways used them and, at the grouping of 1923, the survivors passed into Great Western Railway (GWR) stock. The GWR perpetuated the type in the GWR 5600 Class. The other major railway company in Wales, the LNWR, also had the LNWR Webb Coal Tank Class, though this was grouped into the LMS not the GWR.

== Overview ==
The railways of South Wales seem to have had a particular liking for the 0-6-2T type. This was because the nature of the work they undertook demanded high adhesive weight, plenty of power with good braking ability, but no need for outright speed, nor large tanks or bunker as the distances from pit to port were short. These Welsh locomotives were taken over by the GWR at the grouping in 1923 and many were rebuilt with GWR taper boilers.

== Numbering ==
Many Welsh 0-6-2T locomotives passed into British Railways (BR) ownership in 1948 and these included (with some gaps in numbering). GWR engines all retained their numbers upon nationalisation.

- Rhymney Railway, BR numbers 30-83
- Cardiff Railway, BR number 155
- Barry Railway, BR numbers (random) 198-231 and 238-277 (the Barry Railway locomotives had all been withdrawn by 1952 so they are less well-documented than the others)
- Taff Vale Railway, BR numbers (random) 204-420 and 438-440
- Brecon and Merthyr Railway, BR numbers 422-436

== Railways ==
=== Alexandra (Newport and South Wales) Docks and Railway ===
Four 0-6-2T were handed over to the GWR by the Alexandra (Newport and South Wales) Docks and Railway (ADR) on 1 January 1922. Three were built for the ADR in 1908 by Andrew Barclay, and one was rebuilt from an 0-6-0T (built 1868, obtained secondhand from the London and North Western Railway (LNWR) in 1879) in 1921 by Hawthorn Leslie.

In addition to these, the ADR owned one 0-6-2ST that they purchased secondhand from the LNWR in 1880. It had been built in either 1848 or 1857 as an 0-6-0 tender locomotive, and subsequently rebuilt twice: first as an 0-6-0ST in either 1865 or 1869; then as an 0-6-2ST in 1878. It was sold by the ADR in 1900, and so did not become GWR property.

=== Barry Railway ===
The Barry Railway handed over 72 0-6-2T to the GWR on 1 January 1922. There were 25 of Class B, built in 1888–90; 42 of class B1, built between 1890 and 1900; and five of Class K, built in 1899.

=== Brecon and Merthyr Railway ===
Eighteen 0-6-2T were handed over to the GWR by the Brecon and Merthyr Tydfil Junction Railway on 1 July 1922. The first to be built were four saddle tanks from Vulcan Foundry, two each in 1894 and 1905. These were followed by eight side tanks built by Robert Stephenson & Co. in two batches of four, in 1909–10 and 1914; they were similar to the Rhymney Railway R class. Finally came six further side tanks from Stephensons, built in two batches of three in 1915 and 1921: these had larger coupled wheels, being intended for passenger work, and were based on the Rhymney Railway P class.

=== Cardiff Railway ===
Two predecessors to the Cardiff Railway had 0-6-2T locomotives. The earliest was the Bute Trustees (which managed the docks on behalf of the Marquess of Bute), which had a single 0-6-2T built for them in 1886. The Bute Docks Co., successor to the Trustees from 1886, bought three more with enlarged fireboxes: two in 1887 and one in 1894. The Cardiff Railway, which the Bute Docks Co. had become in 1897, bought two more, with enlarged bunkers, in 1898. In 1905, two of an improved design were bought; two more of this design were bought in 1919. The final, and largest, design of 0-6-2T to arrive on the Cardiff Railway were three built in 1908, these were similar to the Taff Vale Railway O4 class but with larger tanks and bunkers. Altogether thirteen 0-6-2T, all built by Kitson & Co., were handed over to the GWR by the Cardiff Railway on 1 January 1922.

=== Neath and Brecon Railway ===
The Neath and Brecon Railway (N&BR) provided the GWR with five 0-6-2T, all built by Robert Stephenson & Co. Two of these were bought by the N&BR in 1903 secondhand from the Port Talbot Railway; they had been built in 1897. The last three were similar to the Rhymney Railway M class and were bought new, one each in 1906, 1908 and 1910.

=== Port Talbot Railway ===
The Port Talbot Railway (PTR) ordered five 0-6-2T from Robert Stephenson & Co. in August 1896; before delivery commenced, the order was increased to eleven. They were delivered in 1897–98 as PTR nos. 4–14. With the purchase of larger locomotives a few years later, some of the 0-6-2T were found to be surplus to requirements, and four were sold – two (nos. 4 and 7) to the RSB in 1901, and two (nos. 5 and 6) to the N&BR in 1903.

The PTR was taken over by the GWR on 1 January 1908, but its locomotive fleet was not absorbed into the main GWR fleet until 1 January 1922. The seven remaining 0-6-2T (PTR nos. 8–14) subsequently became GWR nos. 183–9. Withdrawal occurred between 1929 and 1948, with one (GWR no. 184) surviving long enough to become BR property.

=== Rhondda and Swansea Bay Railway ===
The Rhondda and Swansea Bay Railway (RSB) had nineteen 0-6-2T locomotives. All but two of these were built by Kitson & Co. The first was RSB no. 4, built in 1885. This was followed by a larger design, RSB nos. 8–16 and 20–22, built in three batches between 1889 and 1899. In 1901, two were bought secondhand from the PTR – built by Robert Stephenson & Co. in 1897 and 1898, they became RSB nos. 23 and 24. Finally, four locomotives of a still larger design were built, RSB nos. 25–28, two each in 1902 and 1904.

Working of the RSB was taken over by the GWR on 1 July 1906, but the RSB locomotive fleet remained separate – it was not incorporated into the main GWR fleet until the RSB was itself absorbed by the GWR on 1 January 1922. In the meantime, a number of GWR locomotives were transferred into the RSB fleet, but no 0-6-2T were involved. Following the grouping, the nineteen RSB 0-6-2T became GWR nos. 164–182. Withdrawal occurred between 1926 and 1936.

=== Rhymney Railway ===
The Rhymney Railway had a total of 103 0-6-2T locomotives at one time or another. These comprised:

- K class – 47 saddle tanks built by Vulcan Foundry, Sharp Stewart, Hudswell Clarke and Neilson Reid between 1890 and 1900. One was withdrawn in 1909, the remainder passed to the GWR.
- M class (including the Ma and Mr classes) – six side tanks built by Robert Stephenson & Co. in 1904
- R class – fifteen side tanks built by Robert Stephenson & Co., Hudswell Clarke and Beyer Peacock between 1907 and 1921
- L1 class – three saddle tanks rebuilt between 1908 and 1911 from L class 2-4-2ST, originally built by Vulcan Foundry in 1890. One was withdrawn in 1921, the other two passed to the GWR.
- P class – three side tanks built by Robert Stephenson & Co. in 1909, one of which was rebuilt to P1 class in 1915
- P1 class – two side tanks, one rebuilt from P class in 1915, and one built new by Hudswell Clarke in 1917
- A and A1 classes – 24 side tanks built by Robert Stephenson & Co. and Hudswell Clarke between 1910 and 1918. The first sixteen had round-top fireboxes (A class); the last eight had Belpaire fireboxes (A1 class). Some locomotives were rebuilt from round-top to Belpaire, or vice versa, and reclassified accordingly.
- AP class – four side tanks built by Hudswell Clarke in 1921

The GWR inherited 101 of these on 1 January 1922.

The Rhymney Railway's A, M and R classes were successful designs ideally suited to hauling heavy coal trains a relatively short distance. In 1926, No 17 was reboilered by the GWR and in this form was visually almost indistinguishable from the GWR 5600 Class.

These three classes (and the larger wheeled P class) were designed for work on the Rhymney Railway, replacing smaller locomotives. When the smaller railway companies were forcibly merged into the GWR in 1923, these modern 0-6-2Ts were in generally good order (some were a few months old) and had proved successful. Collectively they became the blueprint for the 200 strong GWR 5600 class.

The design of the 5600 followed the Rhymney designs quite closely but adopted GWR practice as far as possible, by utilising many standardized parts. Included in Collett's innovations was a standard number 2 boiler which was suitable for the 5600 (and the M and R class Rhymney locomotives), complete with the traditional copper GWR safety valve casing and copper-capped chimney. Some A and P classes were also rebuilt but used the slightly shorter standard number 10 boiler, also to good effect.

Five R class locos were upgraded from 1926 onwards. All told sixteen "Stephenson" locos were similarly dealt with between 1926 and 1949.

=== Taff Vale Railway ===
The Taff Vale Railway had a total of 209 0-6-2T locomotives, all of which passed to the GWR on 1 January 1922. These comprised:

- M class – 41 built in several batches: 38 by Kitson & Co. between 1884 and 1891, plus three built at Cardiff West Yard in 1891–92. All were rebuilt between 1899 and 1913, becoming the M1 class.
- N class – ten built by Kitson & Co. in 1891.
- O class – six built at Cardiff West Yard in 1894–95.
- O1 class – fourteen built in two batches: eight by Kitson & Co. in 1894 and six at Cardiff West Yard in 1897.
- U class – eight built by Vulcan Foundry in 1895.
- U1 class – seven built by Vulcan Foundry in 1896.
- O2 class – nine built by Neilson Reid in 1899.
- O3 class – fifteen built by Hudswell Clarke (6), Kitson & Co. (3) and Vulcan Foundry (6) between 1902 and 1905.
- O4 class – 41 built in several batches by Manning Wardle (7), Beyer Peacock (24) and Vulcan Foundry (10) between 1907 and 1910.
- A class – 58 built in several batches by Hawthorn Leslie (27), North British (6), Vulcan Foundry (13) and Nasmyth Wilson (12) between 1914 and 1921.
