= Taff Vale Railway H class =

Class of Welsh 0-6-0T steam locomotives

Type and origin
- Power type: Steam
- Designer: Tom Hurry Riches
- Builder: Kitson & Co.
- Build date: 1884
- Total produced: 3
Specifications
- Configuration
  - Whyte: 0-6-0T
- Gauge: 4 ft 8 1/2 in (1,435 mm) standard gauge
- Driver dia.: 5 ft 3 in (1.600 m)
- Loco weight: 44.75 long tons (45.47 t; 50.12 short tons)
- Fuel type: Coal
- Boiler pressure: 140 psi (0.97 MPa)
- Cylinders: Two, inside
- Cylinder size: 17 in × 26 in (432 mm × 660 mm)
- Valve gear: Stephenson
- Valve type: Slide valves
Performance figures
- Tractive effort: 15,040 lbf (66.9 kN)
Career
- Operators: Taff Vale Railway; Great Western Railway; British Railways
- Withdrawn: 1951-1953
- Disposition: All sold or hired out of service; all ultimately scrapped.

The Taff Vale Railway H class was a class of three 0-6-0T steam tank locomotives designed by Tom Hurry Riches, built by Kitson & Co. and introduced to the Taff Vale Railway in 1884. They were primarily used on the Pwllyrhebog Colliery Incline, and had special tapered boilers for this purpose.

== Numbering ==
Builder & maker's Numbers	TVR	GWR	BR No. & date	Withdrawal
Kitson 2697	141	792	193 in 6/1948	Sold 2/1952 to NCB
Kitson 2698	142	793	194 in 9/1948	11/1953, hired to NCB
Kitson 2699	143	794	195 in 2/1949	Sold 11/1951

== Withdrawal and disposal ==
193 was used by the NCB at the Tar distillation plant, Wernddu, Caerphilly; it was scrapped in January 1960. 194 was also used at Wernddu Tar plant, and was scrapped at Swindon.

== See also ==
- Locomotives of the Great Western Railway
