= Rhymney Railway P class =

Class of British steam locomotives

Rhymney Railway P, P1 and AP classes
Type and origin
- Power type: Steam
- Designer: C. T. Hurry Riches
- Builder: Robert Stephenson & Co. (3), Hudswell Clarke (5)
- Build date: 1909–1921
- Total produced: 8
Specifications
- Configuration
  - Whyte: 0-6-2T
  - UIC: C1
- Gauge: 4 ft 8 1/2 in (1,435 mm) standard gauge
- Driver dia.: 5 ft 0 in (1.524 m)
- Loco weight: P class, 58.95 long tons (66.02 short tons; 59.90 t); AP class, 63 long tons (71 short tons; 64 t)
- Fuel type: Coal
- Boiler pressure: 175 psi (1.21 MPa)
- Cylinders: Two, inside
- Cylinder size: P: 18 in × 26 in (457 mm × 660 mm); AP: 18.5 in × 26 in (470 mm × 660 mm)
Performance figures
- Tractive effort: P: 20,885 lbf (92.90 kN); AP: 22,060 lbf (98.1 kN)
Career
- Operators: RR • GWR • BR
- Power class: GWR/BR: 3P
- Withdrawn: P: 1954–1955; P1: 1950–1953; AP: 1954–1955

The Rhymney Railway P class was a class of 0-6-2T steam locomotive introduced into traffic in 1909 designed by the Rhymney Railway's engineer C. T. Hurry Riches. These were substantial sized tank locomotives, weighed 60 long tons (67.2 short tons; 61.0 t) (59 long tons or 66.1 short tons or 59.9 t after rebuilding) and were 35 feet 0 inches (10.67 m) in length.

== Construction ==
There were initially three locos in the class augmented by another in 1917. The first batch were built by Robert Stephenson and Company but the last by Hudswell Clarke. The last differed in having a Belpaire firebox and was classed as P1. Four more were built by Hudswell Clarke in 1921 just before the company was absorbed by the GWR. These had superheaters and larger cylinders and were classified AP. The Rhymney subsequently rebuilt one of the P class, No. 5, to P1 class.

Numbering
Year	RR Class	RR No.	Builder	Builder Nos.	GWR/BR No.
1909	P	4–6	Robert Stephenson & Co.	3372–3374	82, 76, 83
1917	P1	31	Hudswell Clarke	1121	77
1921	AP	35–38	Hudswell Clarke	1443–1444, 1456–1457	78–81

== Overview of RR classes ==
The P/P1 classes and preceding 1904 introduced M and 1910 A and R classes were closely related designs ideally suited to hauling trains a relatively short distance. The P's were specifically designed for passenger work having larger driving wheels of 5 ft 0 in (1,524 mm) diameter.

All four were reboilered by the GWR with the number 10 boiler from 1926 onwards and in this form was visually similar to the GWR 5600 Class apart from the larger wheels.

Thus the P's (as opposed to the related "Stephenson" M class, R and A classes) were designed for passenger work on the Rhymney Railway, replacing smaller locomotives. When the smaller railway companies were forcibly merged into the GWR these modern 0-6-2's were in generally good order (some were a few months old) and had proved successful. Collectively they became the blueprint for the 200 strong 5600 class.

The design of the 5600 class followed the Rhymney designs quite closely but adopted GWR practice as far as possible, by utilising many standardized parts. Included in Collett's innovations was a standard number 2 boiler which was suitable for the 5600 (and the M and R class Rhymney locomotives), complete with the traditional copper GWR safety valve casing and copper-capped chimney. A and P classes were rebuilt but used the slightly shorter standard number 10 boiler, also to good effect.

All told twenty nine "Stephenson" locos were similarly dealt with up to as late as 1949.

== Welsh 0-6-2T types ==
The railways of South Wales seem to have had a particular liking for the 0-6-2T type. This was because the nature of the work they undertook demanded high adhesive weight, plenty of power with good braking ability, but no need for outright speed, nor large tanks or bunker as the distances from pit to port were short. These Welsh locomotives were taken over by the GWR at the grouping in 1923 and many including seventeen of the Rhymney A, M, P and R's were rebuilt with GWR taper boilers. All the Rhymney Stevenson derived locos passed into British Railways (BR) ownership in 1948. Others included (with some gaps in numbering):

Brecon and Merthyr Railway, BR numbers 431-436 Cardiff Railway, BR number 155 Rhymney Railway, BR numbers 35-83 Taff Vale Railway, BR numbers 204-399 For further information on these pre-grouping locomotives see Locomotives of the Great Western Railway.

== See also ==
- Welsh 0-6-2T locomotives
