= Taff Vale Railway U1 class =

Two classes of Welsh 0-6-2T locomotives

Taff Vale Railway U and U1 classes
Type and origin
- Power type: Steam
- Designer: Tom Hurry Riches
- Builder: Vulcan Foundry
- Build date: U: 1895; U1: 1896
- Total produced: U: 8 U1: 7
Specifications
- Configuration
  - Whyte: 0-6-2T
  - UIC: C1 n2t
- Gauge: 4 ft 8 1/2 in (1,435 mm) standard gauge
- Driver dia.: 5 ft 3 in (1.600 m)
- Trailing dia.: U: 3 ft 8 3/4 in (1.137 m); U1: 3 ft 1 in (0.940 m)
- Loco weight: U: 63 long tons 0 cwt (141,100 lb or 64 t) (70.6 short tons); U1: 62 long tons 18 cwt (140,900 lb or 63.9 t) (70.4 short tons)
- Boiler pressure: 160 psi (1.10 MPa)
- Superheater: None
- Cylinders: Two
- Cylinder size: 17.5 in × 26 in (444 mm × 660 mm)
- Valve gear: Stephenson
Performance figures
- Tractive effort: 17,190 lbf (76.46 kN)
Career
- Operators: TVR » GWR
- Retired: 1927–1931
- Disposition: All scrapped

The Taff Vale Railway U and U1 classes were 0-6-2T steam tank locomotive operated by Taff Vale Railway, Wales, from 1895. All were still in use when the Taff Vale Railway was acquired by the Great Western Railway in 1922 but were withdrawn from traffic between 1927 and 1931.

== Overview ==
Tom Hurry Riches, the Taff Vale Railway's Locomotive Superintendent brought out 2 similar classes, the U and the U1 for working passenger trains, both 0-6-2Ts. The only difference between the U and U1 class was in the radial wheels which were 3 ft 8 3/4 in (1.137 m) in the former and 3 ft 1 in (0.940 m) in the latter.

The boilers were identical with those fitted on the N, O and O1 classes but worked at the design pressure of 160 pounds-force per square inch (1.10 MPa), the mixed traffic engines being worked at 150 psi (1.03 MPa), or occasionally 140 psi (0.97 MPa). The main differences from the mixed traffic engines were larger diameter driving wheels, a longer wheelbase and replacing the usual four bar motion with single bar.

== Accidents and incidents ==
- On 23 January 1911 locomotive No. 193 was hauling a passenger train which was in a rear-end collision with a freight train at Hopkinstown, Glamorgan. Eleven people were killed and five were injured.

== Numbering ==
Year	Quantity	Manufacturer	Serial numbers	TVR Numbers	GWR Numbers	Notes
1895	8	Vulcan Foundry	1437–1444	191–194, 23, 72, 76 and 77	593, 595–597, 587, 589–591	U class
1896	7	Vulcan Foundry	1458–1464	30, 40, 79, 195–198	602, 588, 592, 598, 599, 603, 600	U1 class

== See also ==
- Welsh 0-6-2T locomotives
- Locomotives of the Great Western Railway
