= Rhymney Railway M class =

Steam locomotive

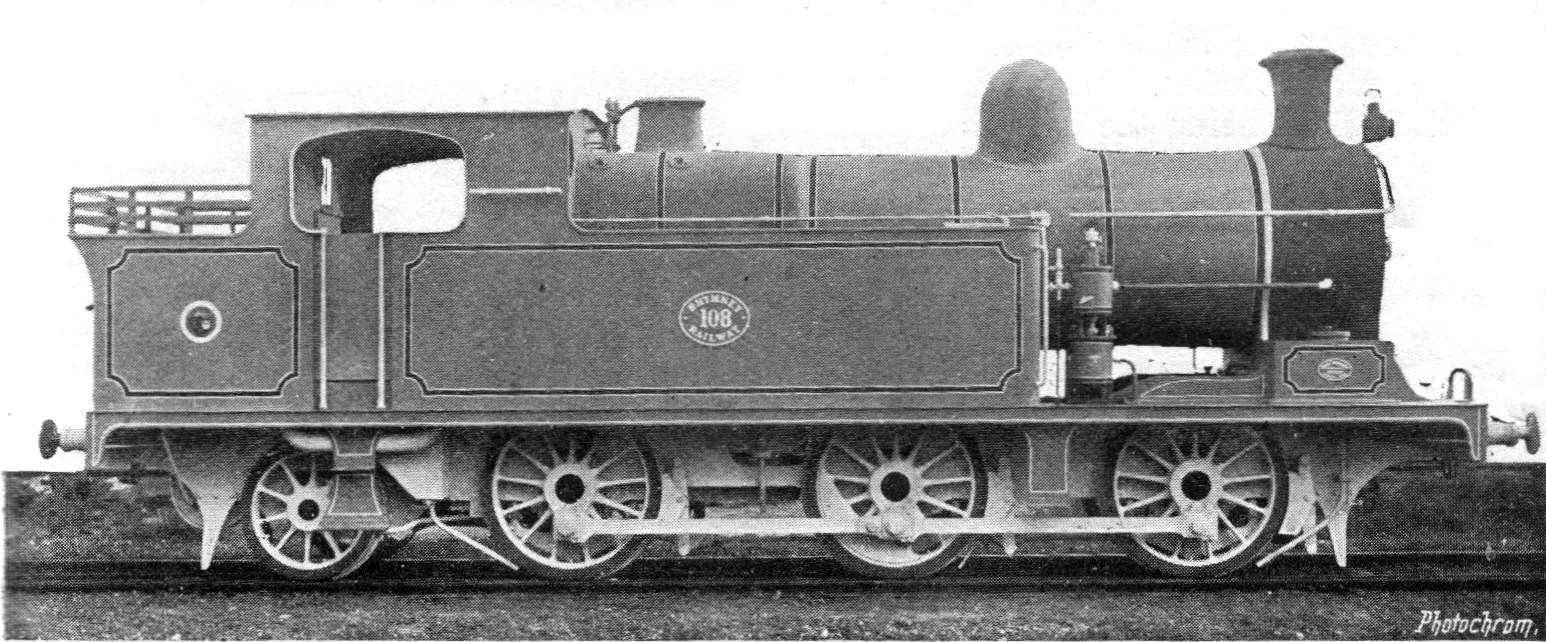
- No. 108
Type and origin
- Power type: Steam
- Designer: Richard Jenkins
- Builder: Robert Stephenson & Co.
- Serial number: 3125–3130
- Build date: 1904
- Total produced: 6
Specifications
- Configuration
  - Whyte: 0-6-2T
  - UIC: C1n2t
- Gauge: 4 ft 8 1/2 in (1,435 mm) standard gauge
- Driver dia.: 4 ft 6 in (1,372 mm)
- Length: 36 ft 9 in (11.20 m)
- Loco weight: 62 long tons 11 cwt (140,100 lb or 63.6 t) (70.1 short tons)
- Fuel type: Coal
- Boiler pressure: 175 lbf/in^{2} (1.21 MPa)
- Cylinders: Two, inside
- Cylinder size: 18.5 in × 26 in (470 mm × 660 mm)
- Valve gear: Stephenson
Performance figures
- Tractive effort: 24,510 lbf (109.0 kN)
Career
- Operators: RR, GWR, BR
- Numbers: RR: 106–110, 16; GWR: 47–51, 33
- Withdrawn: 1935–1951

The Rhymney Railway M class was a class of 0-6-2T tank locomotive introduced into traffic on the Rhymney Railway in 1904. These were substantial sized tank engines, and weighed 66 long tons (74 short tons; 67 t) (64 long tons or 72 short tons or 65 tonnes after rebuilding) and were 36 feet 9 inches (11.20 m) in length.

There were six locos in the class. They were built by Robert Stephenson and Company and are sometimes referred to as the Rhymney Stephensons even though Hudswell Clarke and Beyer, Peacock and Company contributed many of the derived designs.

== Numbering ==
The locomotives were numbered 16, 106–110 by the Rhymney. All passed to the Great Western Railway in 1922, and were renumbered 33, 47–51 in order. Three locomotives were taken into British Railways stock in 1948 and were numbered 33, 47 and 51.

== Overview of RR classes ==
The M class and related 1909 R class and 1910 A class were successful designs ideally suited to hauling heavy coal trains a relatively short distance. In 1930 M class No 47 was reboilered by the GWR and in this form was visually almost indistinguishable from the GWR 5600 Class.

Thus the M, R (and closely related A and A1) were designed for mineral working on the fifty mile long main line of the railway from Cardiff to Rhymney, replacing smaller locomotives. The larger wheeled but otherwise similar P class was designed for passenger working.

When the smaller railway companies were forcibly merged into the Great Western Railway, these modern 0-6-2's were in generally good order and had proved successful. Collectively they became the blueprint for the 200 strong 5600 class.

The design of the 5600 class followed the Rhymney designs quite closely but adopted GWR practice as far as possible, by utilising many standardized parts. Included in Collett's innovations was a standard number 2 boiler which was suitable for the 5600 (and the M and R class Rhymney locomotives), complete with the traditional copper GWR safety valve casing and copper-capped chimney. Fifteen A class and all eight P's were also rebuilt, but used the slightly shorter standard number 10 boiler, also to good effect.

Although only one M was rebuilt, five R class locos were upgraded from 1926 onwards. All told thirty from the four classes were similarly dealt with between 1926 and 1949.

== Welsh 0-6-2T types ==
The railways of South Wales seem to have had a particular liking for the 0-6-2T type. The first was in 1885 on the Taff Vale Railway the design being by their mechanical engineer Tom Hurry Riches, father of the designer of the Rhymney Stevensons.

The suitability of the type was because the nature of the work they undertook demanded high adhesive weight, plenty of power with good braking ability, but no need for outright speed, nor large tanks or bunker as the distances from pit to port were short. These Welsh locomotives were taken over by the GWR at the grouping in 1923 and many including seventeen of the Rhymney A, M, P and R's were rebuilt with GWR taper boilers. All the Rhymney Stephenson derived locos passed into British Railways (BR) ownership in 1948. Others included (with some gaps in numbering):

- Brecon and Merthyr Railway, BR numbers 431-436
- Cardiff Railway, BR number 155
- Rhymney Railway, BR numbers 35-83
- Taff Vale Railway, BR numbers 204-399

For further information on these pre-grouping locomotives see Locomotives of the Great Western Railway.

== See also ==
- Welsh 0-6-2T locomotives
