= Tom Hurry Riches =

British railway engineer (1846–1911)

- Born: 24 November 1846; Cardiff, Wales
- Died: 4 September 1911 (aged 64); Cardiff, Wales
- Known for: Railway engineer
- Children: Charles T. Hurry Riches (son)

Tom Hurry Riches (1846–1911) was a British engineer who became the Locomotive Superintendent of the Taff Vale Railway in October 1873, and held the post until his death on 4 September 1911. At the time of his appointment, he was the youngest locomotive superintendent in Britain. Riches was elected as a Whitworth Exhibitioner in 1868.

Riches served as President of the Institution of Mechanical Engineers between 1907–1908.

His son, Charles T. Hurry Riches was Locomotive Superintendent of the Rhymney Railway from 1906 until 1922.

== Locomotive designs ==
- TVR H class 0-6-0T (1884)
- TVR O1 class 0-6-2T (1894)
- TVR U class 0-6-2T (1895)
- TVR U1 class 0-6-2T (1896)
- TVR O2 class 0-6-2T (1899)
- TVR O3 class 0-6-2T (1904)
- TVR O4 class 0-6-2T (1907)

Business positions
Preceded by B. S. Fisher	Locomotive Superintendent of the Taff Vale Railway; 1873–1911	Succeeded by John Cameron
Professional and academic associations
Preceded by Edward Pritchard Martin	President of the Institution of Mechanical Engineers; 1907–1908	Succeeded by John Aspinall
