= Rhymney Railway A class =

Class of Welsh steam locomotives

Rhymney Railway A and A1 classes
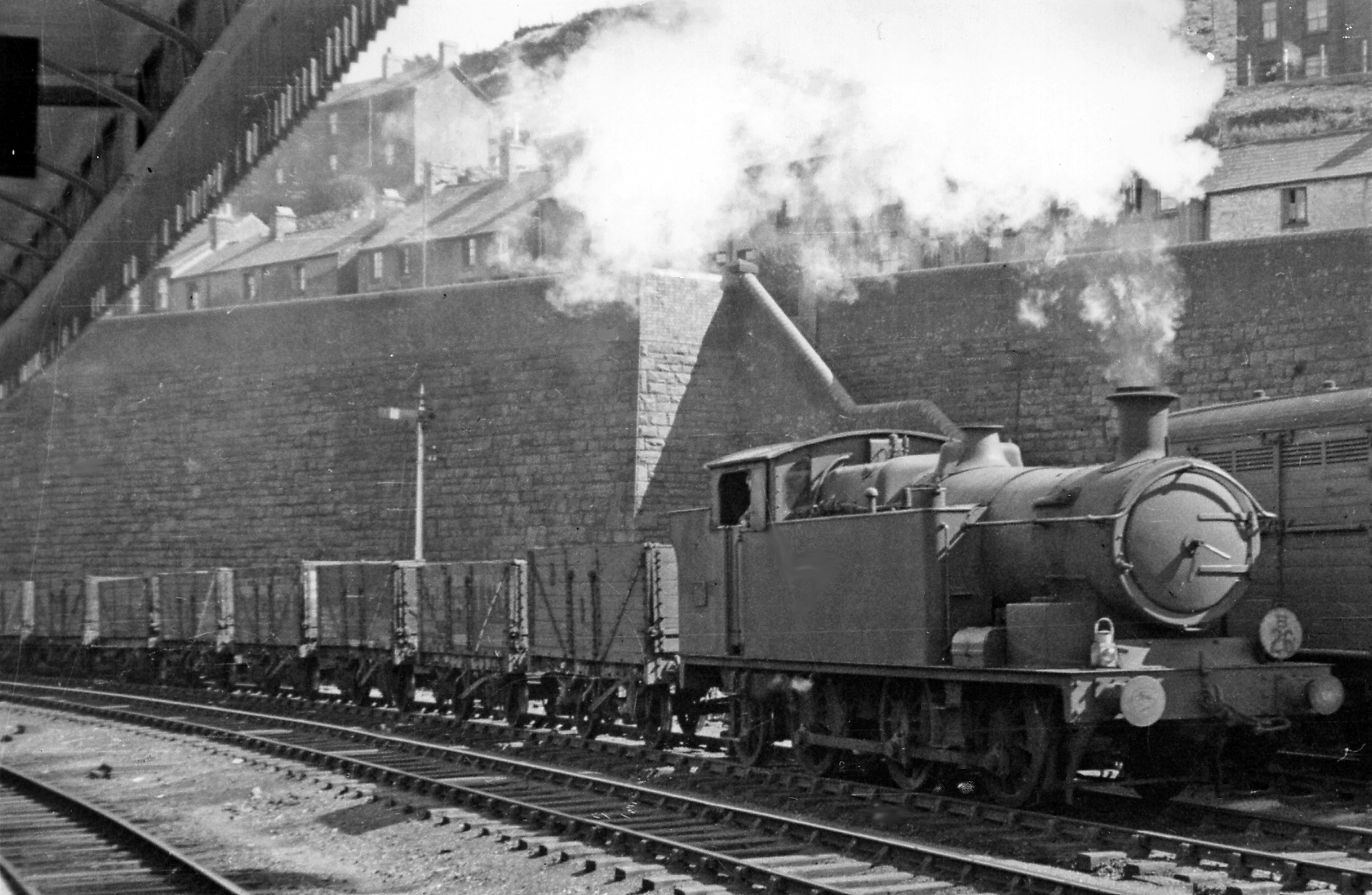
- 'A' class 0-6-2T No. 58 passing Pontypridd Station 1949
Type and origin
- Power type: Steam
- Designer: C. T. Hurry Riches
- Builder: Robert Stephenson & Co. (13); Hudswell Clarke (11)
- Build date: 1910–1918
- Total produced: 24
Specifications
- Configuration
  - Whyte: 0-6-2T
- Gauge: 4 ft 8 1/2 in (1,435 mm) standard gauge
- Driver dia.: 4 ft 4 1/2 in (1,334 mm)
- Length: 35 ft 9 in (10.90 m)
- Loco weight: 63.00–64.15 long tons (64.0–65.2 t)
- Fuel type: Coal
- Boiler pressure: 175 lbf/in^{2} (1.21 MPa)
- Cylinders: Two, inside
- Cylinder size: 18 in × 26 in (457 mm × 660 mm) or 18.5 in × 26 in (470 mm × 660 mm)
Performance figures
- Tractive effort: 23,870 lbf (106.2 kN) or 25,210 lbf (112.1 kN)
Career
- Operators: Rhymney Railway, Great Western Railway, British Railways
- Class: RR: A or A1
- Power class: BR: 4F
- Number in class: A: 16; A1: 8
- Withdrawn: 1948–1955

The Rhymney Railway A class were 0-6-2T tank locomotives introduced into traffic in 1910 and designed by the railway's engineer Hurry Riches. These were substantial sized tank engines, and weighed 64 long tons (72 short tons; 65 t) (63 long tons or 71 short tons or 64 tonnes after rebuilding) and were 35 ft 9 in (10.90 m) in length.

== Construction ==
There were initially five locos in the class augmented by another five in 1911, then three in 1914, two in 1916 and three in 1918. They were built by Robert Stephenson and Company and Hudswell Clarke. The last eight differed in having Belpaire fireboxes and were classed as A1.

Numbering
Year	RR class	RR Nos.	Builder	Builder Nos.	GWR/BR Nos.
1910	A	10–14	Robert Stephenson & Co.	3387–3391	52–56
1910	A	115–119	Robert Stephenson & Co.	3392–3396	71–75
1911	A	15, 18–22	Hudswell Clarke	946–951	57–62
1914	A1	23–25	Hudswell Clarke	1063–1065	63–65
1916	A1	26–27	Hudswell Clarke	1119–1120	66–67
1918	A1	28–30	Robert Stephenson & Co.	3660–3662	68–70

== Overview of RR classes ==
The A class, and the preceding M class of 1904 and R class of 1910, were closely related designs ideally suited to hauling heavy coal trains a relatively short distance.

These three classes (and the larger wheeled P class) were designed for work on the Rhymney Railway, replacing smaller locomotives. When the smaller railway companies were forcibly merged into the Great Western Railway (GWR) in 1923, these modern 0-6-2's were in generally good order (some were a few months old) and had proved successful. Collectively they became the blueprint for the 200 strong GWR 5600 Class.

== Rebuilds of RR classes ==
Fifteen A class locos were upgraded from 1926 onwards. All told twenty nine "Stephenson" locos were similarly dealt with up to as late as 1949. In 1929 No 55 was reboilered by the GWR and in this form was visually almost indistinguishable from the GWR 5600 Class.

The GWR number 2 boiler (used on the 5600 class) was also suitable for the M and R class Rhymney locomotives. The A and P classes were also rebuilt but used the slightly shorter standard number 10 boiler, also to good effect.

== GWR 5600 Class ==
The design of the 5600 class followed the Rhymney designs quite closely but adopted GWR practice as far as possible, by utilising many standardized parts. Included in Collett's innovations was a standard number 2 boiler which was suitable for the 5600 (and the M and R class Rhymney locomotives), complete with the traditional copper GWR safety valve casing and copper-capped chimney.

== Welsh 0-6-2T types ==
The railways of South Wales seem to have had a particular liking for the 0-6-2T type. This was because the nature of the work they undertook demanded high adhesive weight, plenty of power with good braking ability, but no need for outright speed, nor large tanks or bunker as the distances from pit to port were short. These Welsh locomotives were taken over by the GWR at the grouping in 1923 and many including seventeen of the Rhymney A, M, P and R's were rebuilt with GWR taper boilers. All the Rhymney Stephenson derived locos passed into British Railways (BR) ownership in 1948. Others included (with some gaps in numbering):

- Brecon and Merthyr Railway, BR numbers 431-436
- Cardiff Railway, BR number 155
- Rhymney Railway, BR numbers 35-83
- Taff Vale Railway, BR numbers 204-399

For further information on these pre-grouping locomotives see Locomotives of the Great Western Railway.

== See also ==
- Welsh 0-6-2T locomotives
