= Rhymney Railway R class =

Class of 0-6-2T steam locomotive

Rhymney Railway R and R1 classes
Type and origin
- Power type: Steam
- Designer: C. T. Hurry Riches
- Builder: Robert Stephenson & Co. (5), Hudswell, Clarke & Co. (4), Beyer, Peacock & Co. (6)
- Serial number: RS: HC: 1431/32/38/39; BP: 6099–6104
- Build date: 1907–1921
- Total produced: 15
Specifications
- Configuration
  - Whyte: 0-6-2T
- Gauge: 4 ft 8 1/2 in (1,435 mm) standard gauge
- Driver dia.: 4 ft 6 in (1,372 mm)
- Loco weight: 62.5–66.95 long tons (70.00–74.98 short tons; 63.50–68.02 t)
- Fuel type: Coal
- Boiler pressure: 175 lbf/in^{2} (1.21 MPa); Rebuilt: 200 lbf/in^{2} (1.38 MPa)
- Cylinders: Two, inside
- Cylinder size: 18.5 in × 26 in (470 mm × 660 mm)
Performance figures
- Tractive effort: 24,510 lbf (109.0 kN); Rebuilt: 28,015 lbf (124.6 kN)
Career
- Operators: RR, GWR, BR
- Class: RR: R & R1
- Power class: BR: 4F
- Numbers: RR: 1–3, 17, 39–47, 62, 97; GWR/BR: 30–44, 46
- Withdrawn: 1949–1957

The Rhymney R class was a class of 0-6-2T steam locomotive introduced into traffic in 1907 designed by the railway's engineer Hurry Riches. These were substantial sized tank locomotives, and weighed 67 long tons (75 short tons; 68 t) (62 long tons or 69 short tons or 63 t after rebuilding) and were 37 feet (11.28 m) in length.

== History ==
There were initially three locos in the class augmented to five in 1909. They were built by Robert Stephenson, though in 1921 Hudswell Clarke built four and Beyer, Peacock and Company contributed a further six.

Numbering
Year	RR class	RR Nos.	Builder	Builder Nos.	GWR/BR Nos.
1907	R	1–3	Robert Stephenson & Co.	3288–3290	30–32
1909	R	17, 97	Robert Stephenson & Co.	3370–3371	34, 46
1921	R1	39–42	Hudswell Clarke	1431–1432, 1438–1439	35–38
1921	R1	43–47, 62	Beyer, Peacock & Co.	6099–6104	39–44

The R class and related 1904-introduced M and 1910 A classes were successful designs ideally suited to hauling heavy coal trains a relatively short distance. In 1926, No 17 was reboilered by the GWR and in this form was visually almost indistinguishable from the GWR 5600 Class.

Thus the R (and closely related "Stephenson" M class, A, A1 and larger wheeled P classes) were designed for work on the Rhymney Railway, replacing smaller locomotives. When the smaller railway companies were forcibly merged into the GWR, these modern 0-6-2's were in generally good order (some were a few months old) and had proved successful. Collectively they became the blueprint for the 200 strong 5600 class.

The design of the 5600 class followed the Rhymney designs quite closely but adopted GWR practice as far as possible, by utilising many standardized parts. Included in Collett's innovations was a standard number 2 boiler which was suitable for the 5600 (and the M and R class Rhymney locomotives), complete with the traditional copper GWR safety valve casing and copper-capped chimney. Some A and P classes were also rebuilt but used the slightly shorter standard number 10 boiler, also to good effect.

Five R class locos were upgraded from 1926 onwards. All told sixteen "Stephenson" locos were similarly dealt with between 1926 and 1949.

== Welsh 0-6-2T types ==
The railways of South Wales seem to have had a particular liking for the 0-6-2T type. This was because the nature of the work they undertook demanded high adhesive weight, plenty of power with good braking ability, but no need for outright speed, nor large tanks or bunker as the distances from pit to port were short. These Welsh locomotives were taken over by the GWR at the grouping in 1923 and many including seventeen of the Rhymney A, M, P and R's were rebuilt with GWR taper boilers. All the Rhymney Stevenson derived locos passed into British Railways (BR) ownership in 1948. Others included (with some gaps in numbering):

- Brecon and Merthyr Railway, BR numbers 431-436
- Cardiff Railway, BR number 155
- Rhymney Railway, BR numbers 35-83
- Taff Vale Railway, BR numbers 204-399

For further information on these pre-grouping locomotives see Locomotives of the Great Western Railway.

== See also ==
- Welsh 0-6-2T locomotives
