= Taff Vale Railway O4 class =

Class of Welsh 0-6-2T steam locomotives

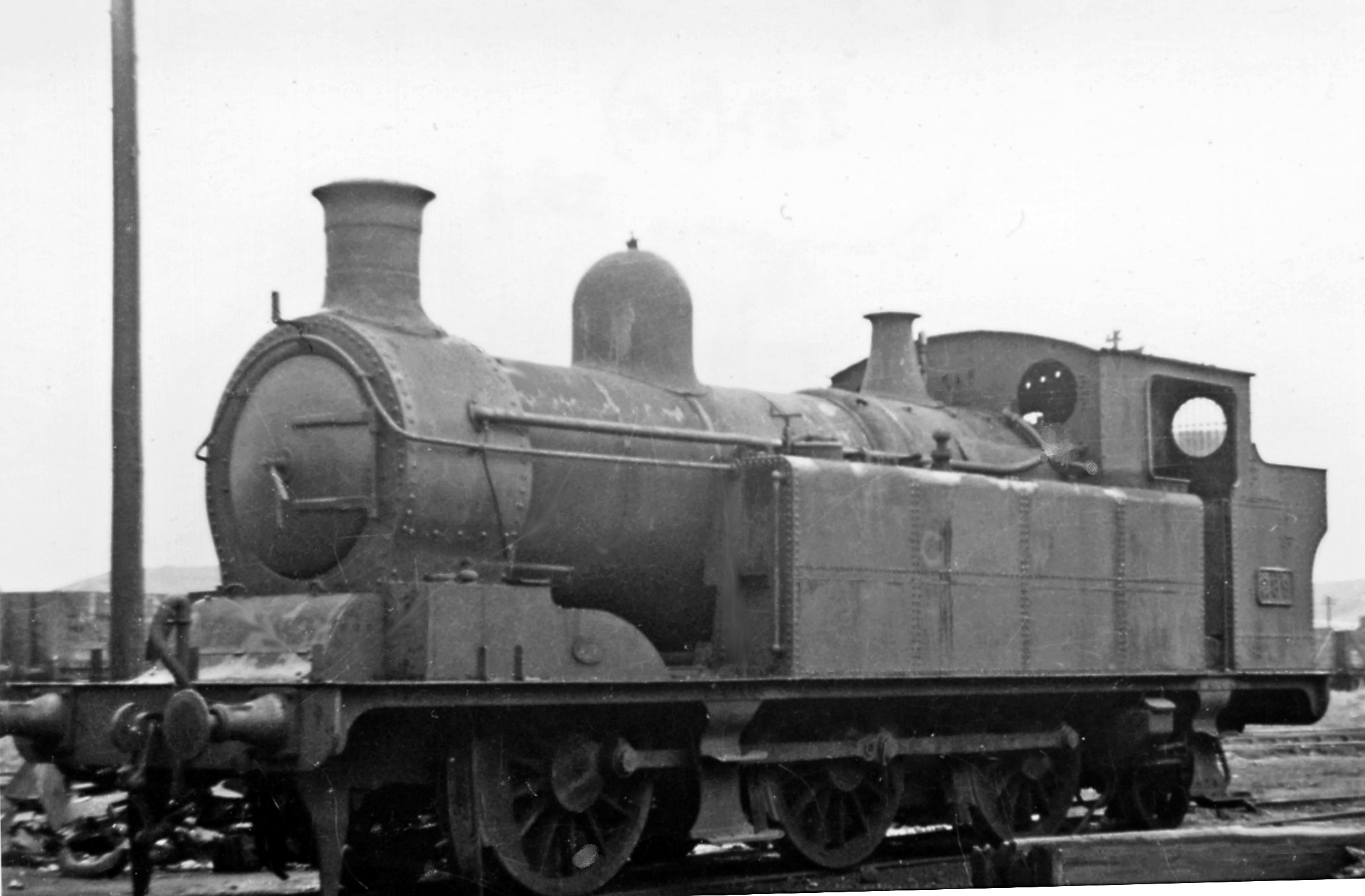
- 'O4' No. 289 at Danygraig Locomotive Depot, Swansea Docks 1946
Type and origin
- Power type: Steam
- Designer: Tom Hurry Riches
- Builder: Beyer, Peacock & Co. (24); Manning Wardle (7); Vulcan Foundry (10)
- Build date: 1907 (7), 1908 (14), 1910 (20)
- Total produced: 41
Specifications
- Configuration
  - Whyte: 0-6-2T
- Gauge: 4 ft 8 1/2 in (1,435 mm) standard gauge
- Driver dia.: 4 ft 6 1/2 in (1.384 m)
- Trailing dia.: 3 ft 1 in (940 mm)
- Wheelbase
  - Engine: 20 ft 4 in (6.20 m)
  - Drivers: 14 ft 6 in (4.42 m)
- Loco weight: 61 long tons (68 short tons; 62 t)
- Fuel type: Coal
- Fuel capacity: 2 t (2.0 long tons; 2.2 short tons)
- Water cap.: 1,600 imp gal (7,300 L)
- Firebox
  - Grate area: 21 sq ft (2.0 m^{2})
- Boiler pressure: 175 psi (1.21 MPa)
- Heating surface
  - Firebox: 107 sq ft (9.9 m^{2})
  - Tubes: 1,194 sq ft (110.9 m^{2})
  - Total surface: 1,301 sq ft (120.9 m^{2})
- Cylinders: Two, inside
- Cylinder size: 17.5 in × 26 in (444 mm × 660 mm)
Performance figures
- Tractive effort: 21,730 lbf (96.7 kN)
Career
- Operators: Taff Vale Railway; Great Western Railway; British Railways
- Retired: 1948–1955
- Disposition: All scrapped

The Taff Vale Railway O4 class was a class of 0-6-2T steam tank locomotives designed by Tom Hurry Riches and introduced to the Taff Vale Railway in 1907. They were rebuilt with taper boilers and superheaters by the Great Western Railway (GWR) from 1924.

The first loco withdrawn was 402 in April 1948 from Treherbert shed. The last three locos, 290, 317 and 321 were withdrawn together from Cardiff East Dock shed in July 1955. None were preserved.

== Builders and numbering ==
The locomotives were built in several batches by Vulcan Foundry, Manning Wardle and Beyer, Peacock and Company. Their GWR numbers were in the range 200-420 but they were not consecutive and were intermingled with other classes.

Year	Quantity	Manufacturer	Serial number	TVR Numbers	GWR Numbers	Notes
1907	7	Manning Wardle	1698–1704	38, 43, 59, 67–69, 94	285, 287, 293–295, 420, 296	420 renumbered 220 sometime between 1946 and 1950
1908	7	Beyer, Peacock & Co.	5095–5101	39, 95, 97, 98, 101, 102, 104	286, 297–302	300–302 renumbered 200–202 sometime between 1946 and 1950
1908	7	Beyer, Peacock & Co.	5127–5133	6, 9, 48, 56, 58, 105, 111	280, 282, 289, 291, 292, 236, 314	314 renumbered 206 sometime between 1946 and 1950
1910	10	Beyer, Peacock & Co.	5384–5393	13, 49, 112–116, 118, 119, 121	409, 290, 315, 317–321, 324, 333	315, 317–321, 324, 333, 409 renumbered 207–211, 215–218 sometime between 1946 and 1950
1910	10	Vulcan Foundry	2529–2538	1, 28, 8, 17, 35, 36, 46, 108–110	278, 279, 281, 283, 284, 414, 288, 310, 311, 313	310, 311, 313, 414 renumbered 203–205, 219 sometime between 1946 and 1950

== See also ==
- Welsh 0-6-2T locomotives
- Locomotives of the Great Western Railway
