= Taff Vale Railway O2 class =

Class of 9 British 0-6-2T locomotives

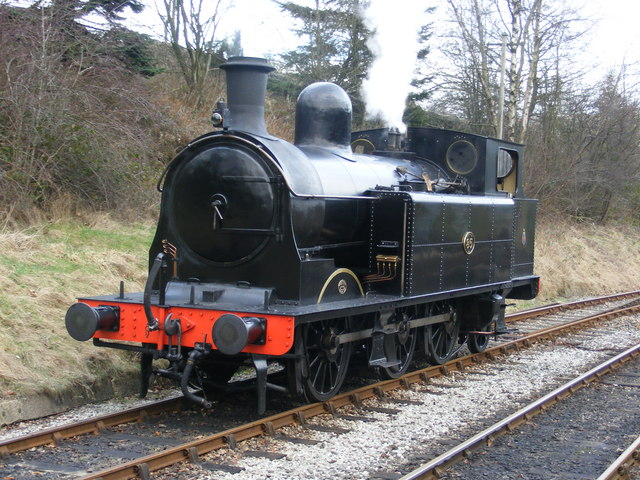
- Taff Vale 85 at Oxenhope, 27 January 2008
Type and origin
- Power type: Steam
- Designer: Tom Hurry Riches
- Builder: Neilson, Reid & Co.
- Build date: 1899
- Total produced: 9
Specifications
- Configuration
  - Whyte: 0-6-2T
  - UIC: C1 n2t
- Gauge: 4 ft 8 1/2 in (1,435 mm) standard gauge
- Driver dia.: 4 ft 6 1/2 in (1.384 m)
- Loco weight: 61 long tons 10 cwt (137,800 lb or 62.5 t) (69.4 short tons)
- Boiler pressure: 160 psi (1.10 MPa)
- Cylinders: Two, inside
- Cylinder size: 17.5 in × 26 in (444 mm × 660 mm)
- Valve gear: Stephenson
Performance figures
- Tractive effort: 19,870 lbf (88,386.16 N)
Career
- Operators: TVR » GWR
- Withdrawn: 1926–1928
- Preserved: One: TVR 85
- Disposition: One preserved, remainder scrapped

The Taff Vale Railway O2 class was a class of 0-6-2T steam tank locomotives designed by Tom Hurry Riches and introduced to the Taff Vale Railway in 1899.

== Numbering ==
Year	Quantity	Builder	Serial numbers	TVR Numbers	GWR numbers	Notes
1899	9	Neilson, Reid & Co.	5409, 5408, 5410–5416	82, 85, 84, 32, 83, 81, 31, 66, 44	423, 426, 425, 413, 424, 421, 412, 419, 415	

== Withdrawal and disposal ==
All were withdrawn from traffic between 1926 and 1928. One locomotive, GWR 426 (TVR 85) was sold to the National Coal Board and used at their Philadelphia Colliery, numbered 52. It was subsequently saved for preservation, and is based at the Keighley and Worth Valley Railway. It was restored to original Taff Vale condition in 2000, although the paintwork didn't receive any lining out, and ran on a regular basis until 2009 when its boiler ticket expired. Due to its popularity and good condition, it received a further overhaul which was completed in February 2016, just in time for the line's Winter Steam Gala that year. This time though, the loco's paintwork received full lining out, effectively completing its original Taff Vale appearance. Since re-entering service, the loco remained part of the railway's operational fleet. It was withdrawn in June 2025 and is now on static display at Oxenhope.

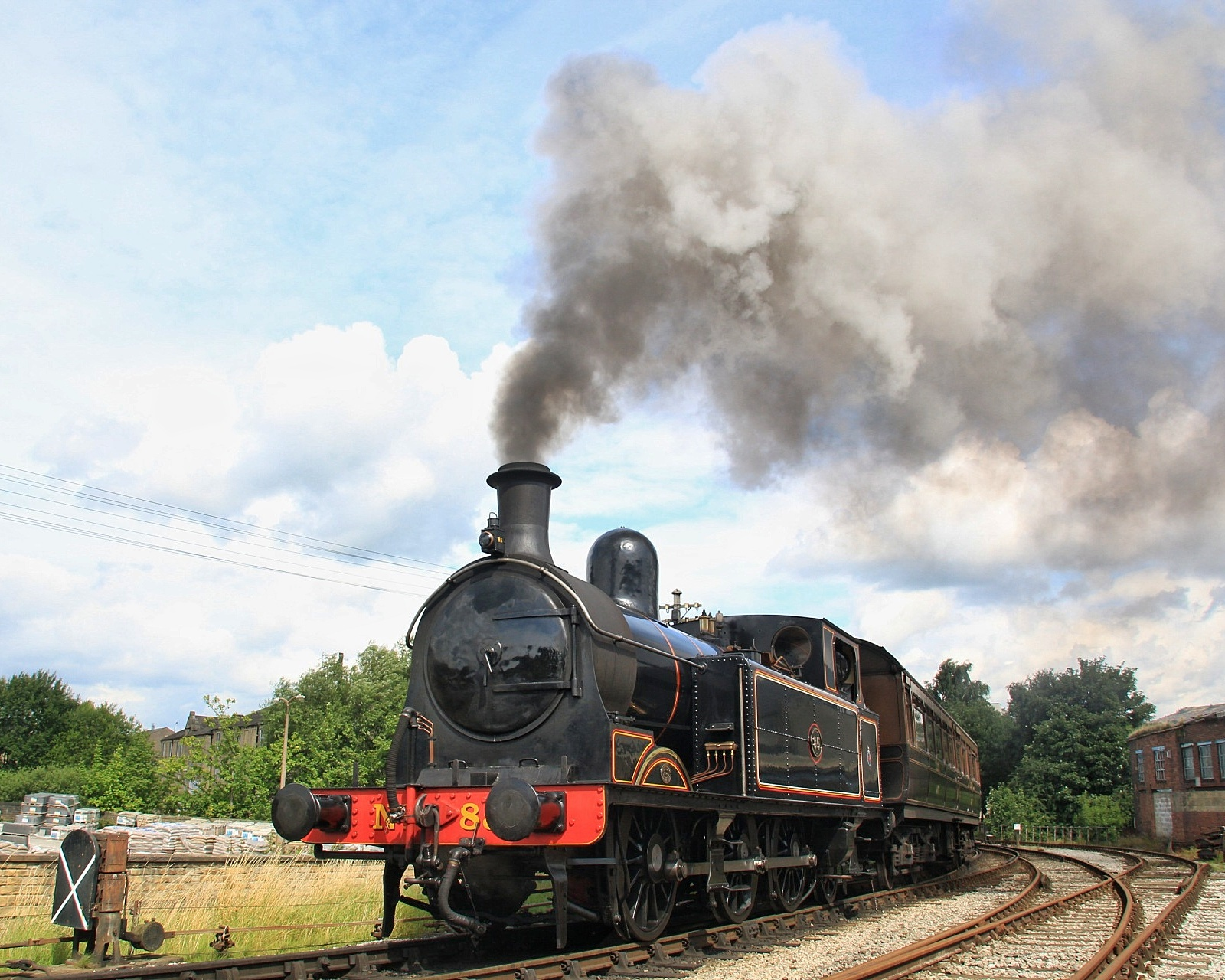
TVR 85 departing Keighley, with a vintage (L&YR) train set. 2017.
