= Taff Vale Railway O1 class =

British 0-6-2T steam tank locomotive

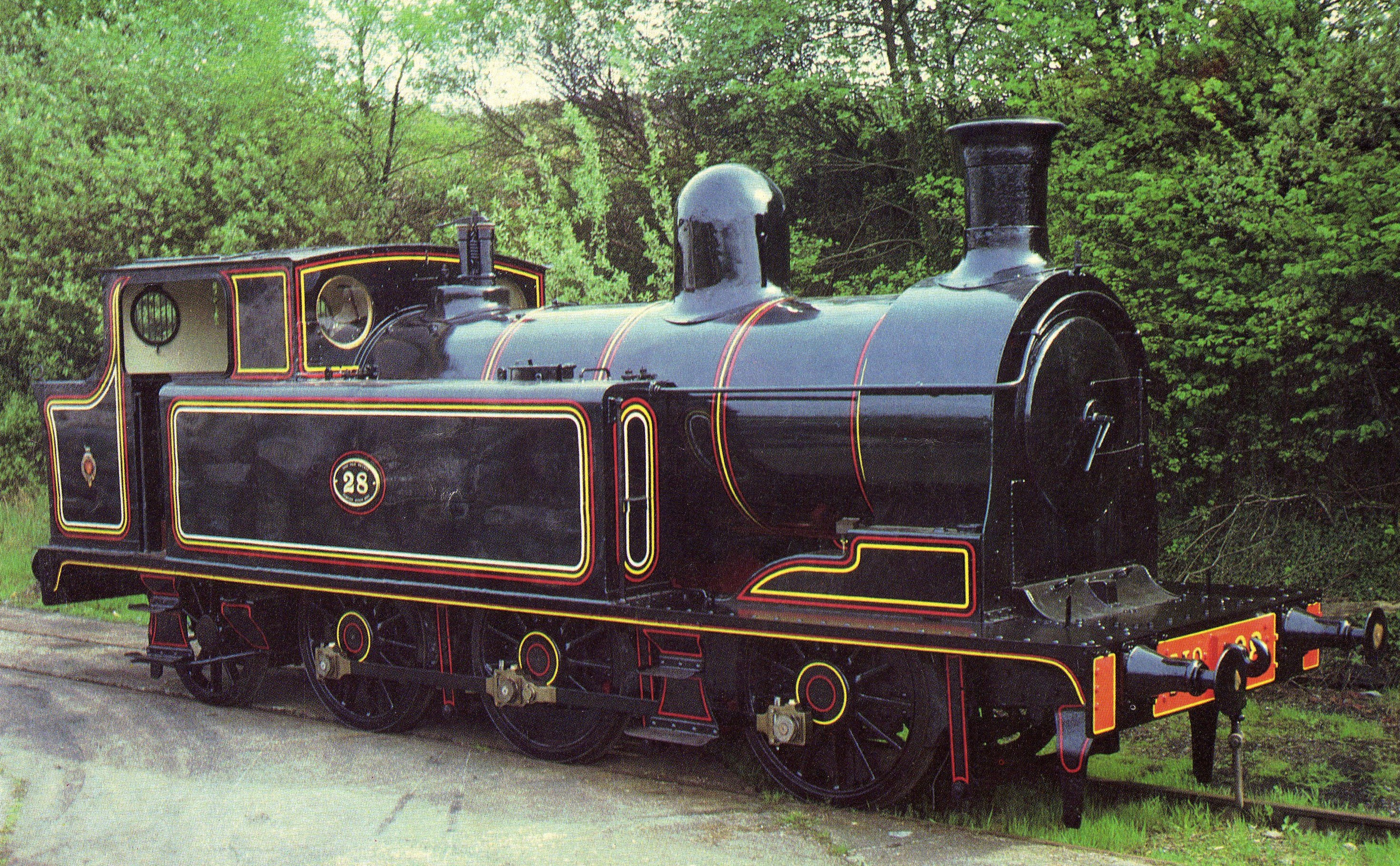
- No 28 when first restored to working order in 1983 by the Caerphilly Railway Society
Type and origin
- Power type: Steam
- Designer: Tom Hurry Riches
- Builder: Kitson & Co. (8); TVR Cardiff West Yard (6)
- Serial number: Kitson 3572–3579
- Build date: 1894 (8), 1897 (6)
- Total produced: 14
Specifications
- Configuration
  - Whyte: 0-6-2T
  - UIC: C1 n2t
- Gauge: 4 ft 8 1/2 in (1,435 mm) standard gauge
- Driver dia.: 4 ft 6 1/2 in (1.384 m)
- Loco weight: 56 long tons 8 cwt (126,300 lb or 57.3 t) (63.2 short tons)
- Fuel type: Coal
- Boiler pressure: 150 psi (1.03 MPa)
- Cylinders: Two
- Cylinder size: 17.5 in × 26 in (444 mm × 660 mm)
- Valve gear: Stephenson
Performance figures
- Tractive effort: 18,620 lbf (82.83 kN)
Career
- Operators: TVR » GWR
- Withdrawn: 1925–1931
- Preserved: No. 28
- Disposition: One preserved, remainder scrapped

The Taff Vale Railway (TVR) O1 class is a class consisting of fourteen 0-6-2T steam tank locomotives, designed by Tom Hurry Riches, which were introduced to the TVR during the period 1894-1897.

== Numbering ==
Year	Quantity	Builder	Serial numbers	TVR Numbers	GWR numbers	Notes
1894	8	Kitson & Co.	3572–3579	27, 29, 37, 41, 65, 70, 73, 78	449, 451, 454, 455, 476, 477, 479, 480	
1897	6	TVR Cardiff West Yard Works	—	28, 60–64	450, 471–475	No. 28 preserved

== Withdrawal and disposal ==
All were withdrawn from traffic between 1925 and 1931.

== Locomotive 28 ==
Locomotive No. 28 is the last surviving Welsh-built standard gauge locomotive. It began its TVR career working the mineral and coal trains from collieries to port. By 1922 when the Great Western Railway had taken control, it had run 483,189 miles, and by 1923 was given a major overhaul, receiving a new boiler from the West Yard Works.

Absorbed into the GWR fleet, No. 28 was renumbered No. 450, and given a GWR-style cover over its safety valve, its external design was unchanged. It was withdrawn from service on 30 October 1926, but was found to be in good mechanical condition and sold to the Government in 1927, for use on the Woolmer Military Instructional Railway, later called the Longmoor Military Railway. The engine was named "Gordon", after the General of Khartoum, and was kept in immaculate condition in Hampshire, performing relatively light duties compared to its TVR working days.

The Second World War broke out and No. 28 was renumbered W.D. 205, then W.D. 70205, before becoming surplus again and put into storage. It was then sold in 1947 to the National Coal Board and used at their Hetton colliery railway. It was renumbered No. 67, though still retaining the "Gordon" nameplates as it engaged in heavy work on the coalfields again. It received a major overhaul in 1955, with minor alterations to its external design, but by 1959 it needed boiler repairs and was withdrawn from service in 1960.

== Preservation ==
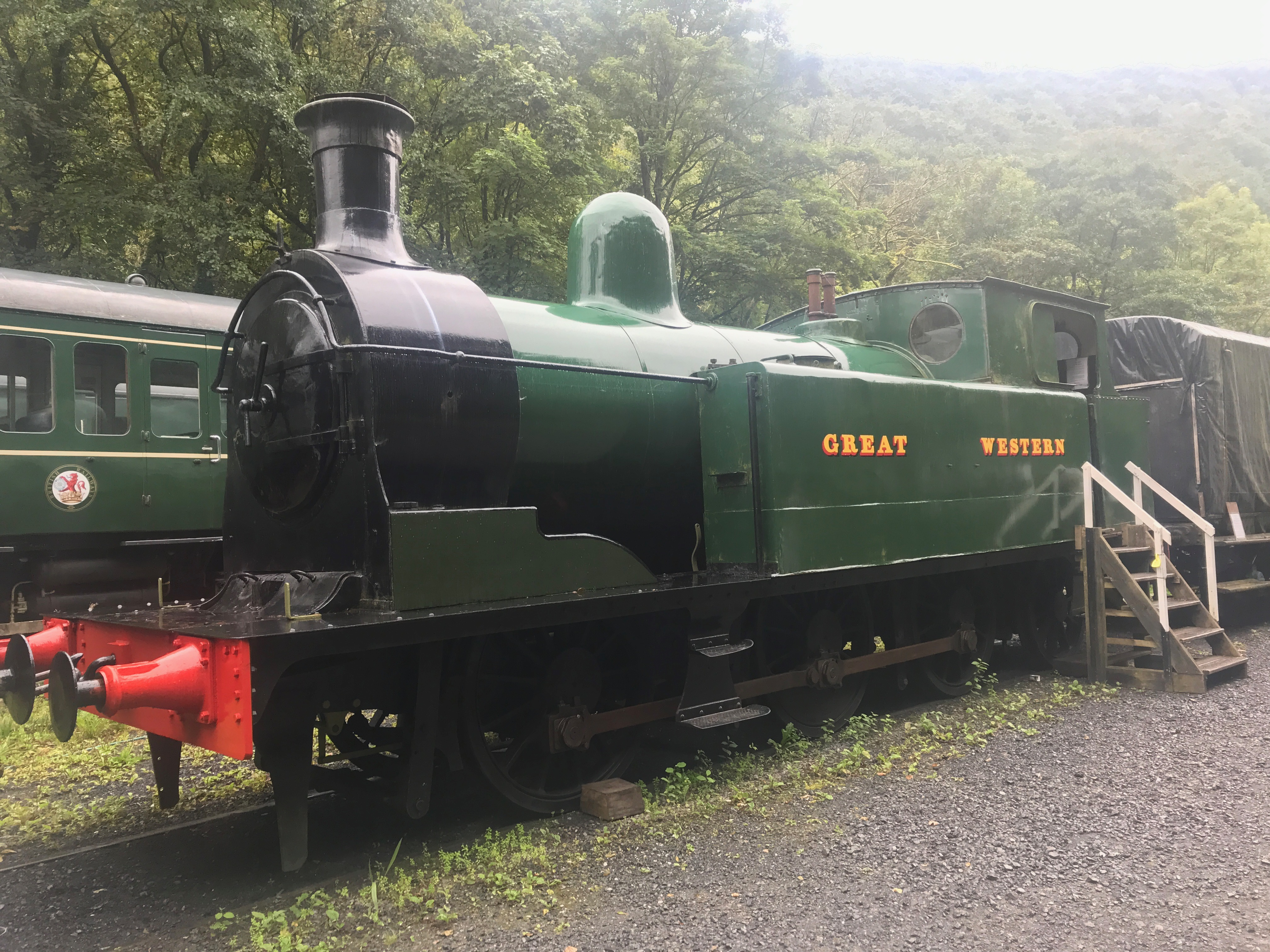
No. 28 photographed at the Gwili Railway in September 2018, where it is a static exhibit.

Following requests to NCB that it should be saved, locomotive 28 was successfully presented to British Railways for preservation in 1962. It is now part of the National Collection. It was originally intended that the last Welsh-built standard gauge locomotive be restored to original TVR condition at the Caerphilly Locomotive Works, however the site was given notice of closure and No. 28 was the last to leave for storage in Swindon and London.

In 1966, it was returned to Caerphilly as the National Museum of Wales had been given custodianship of the locomotive. In the 1983 the engine was restored to working order by the Caerphilly Railway Society and ran for about 7 years, until taken out of service to await routine boiler examination. Caerphilly Railway Society subsequently closed. The locomotive then spent over a decade on loan to the Dean Forest Railway who dismantled it for a more thorough restoration, but this was unsuccessful due to the discovery of cracked springs.

The NRM later in 2013 moved the locomotive to the Llangollen Railway where it was to be reassembled. In 2013 the cosmetic restoration of No. 28 was set to go ahead thanks to a three-way partnership between the National Railway Museum, the Llangollen Railway, and the Gwili Railway, with the aim of returning the locomotive to original condition. In 2014 it moved to the Gwili Railway on static loan under the care of the Gwili Vintage Carriages Group, with the current agreement due to expire in February 2020.

On 1 October 2019 the National Railway Museum and Welsh Railways Trust (Formerly Gwili Vintage Carriages Group) announced a three-year overhaul agreement to return it to steam in a £160,000 project, part-funded by a £18,000 grant from the Association for Industrial Archaeology. This grant will be used to restore the rolling chassis of the locomotive, which includes original Taff Vale Railway components. The overhaul will be carried out at the Gwili Railway, where it will then work.

== Gallery ==
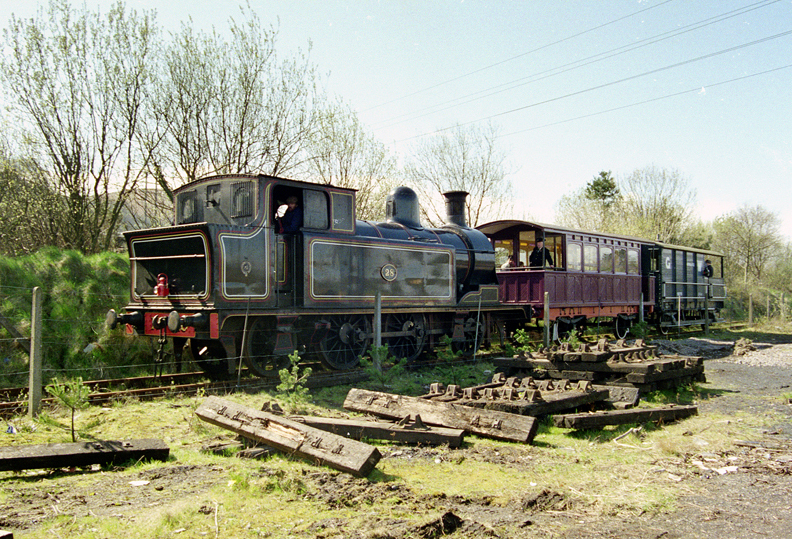

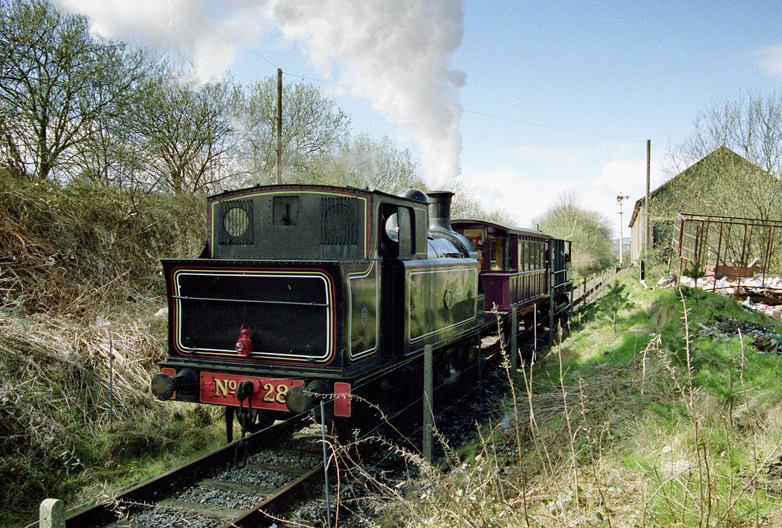

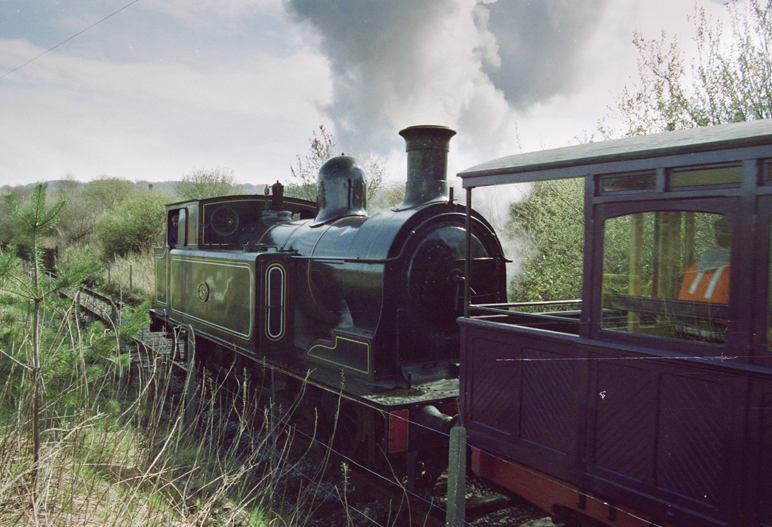

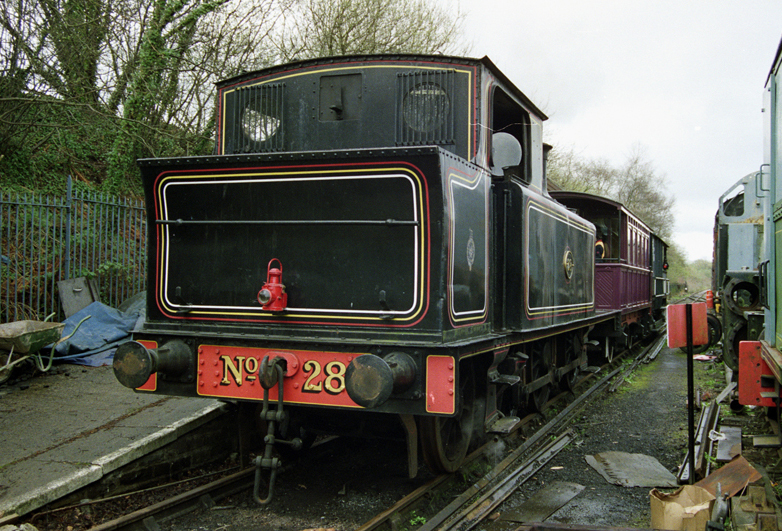

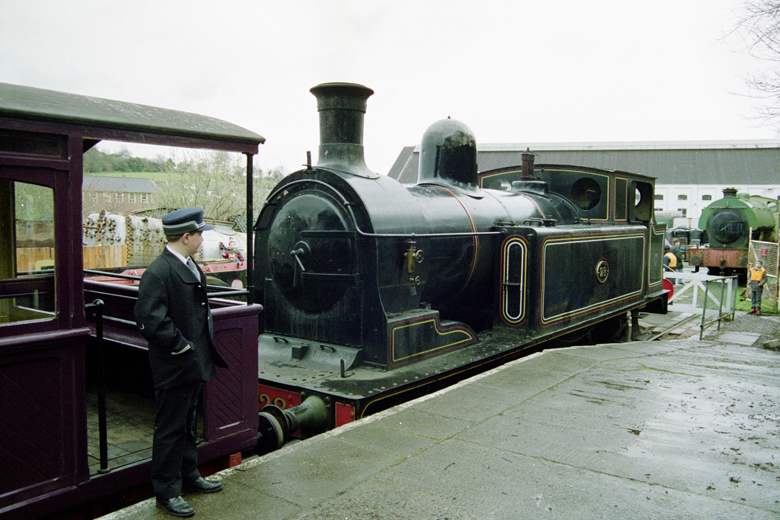
