= Maesycwmmer railway station =

Former railway station in Wales

Coordinates: 51.6455°N 3.2226°W

Maesycwmmer
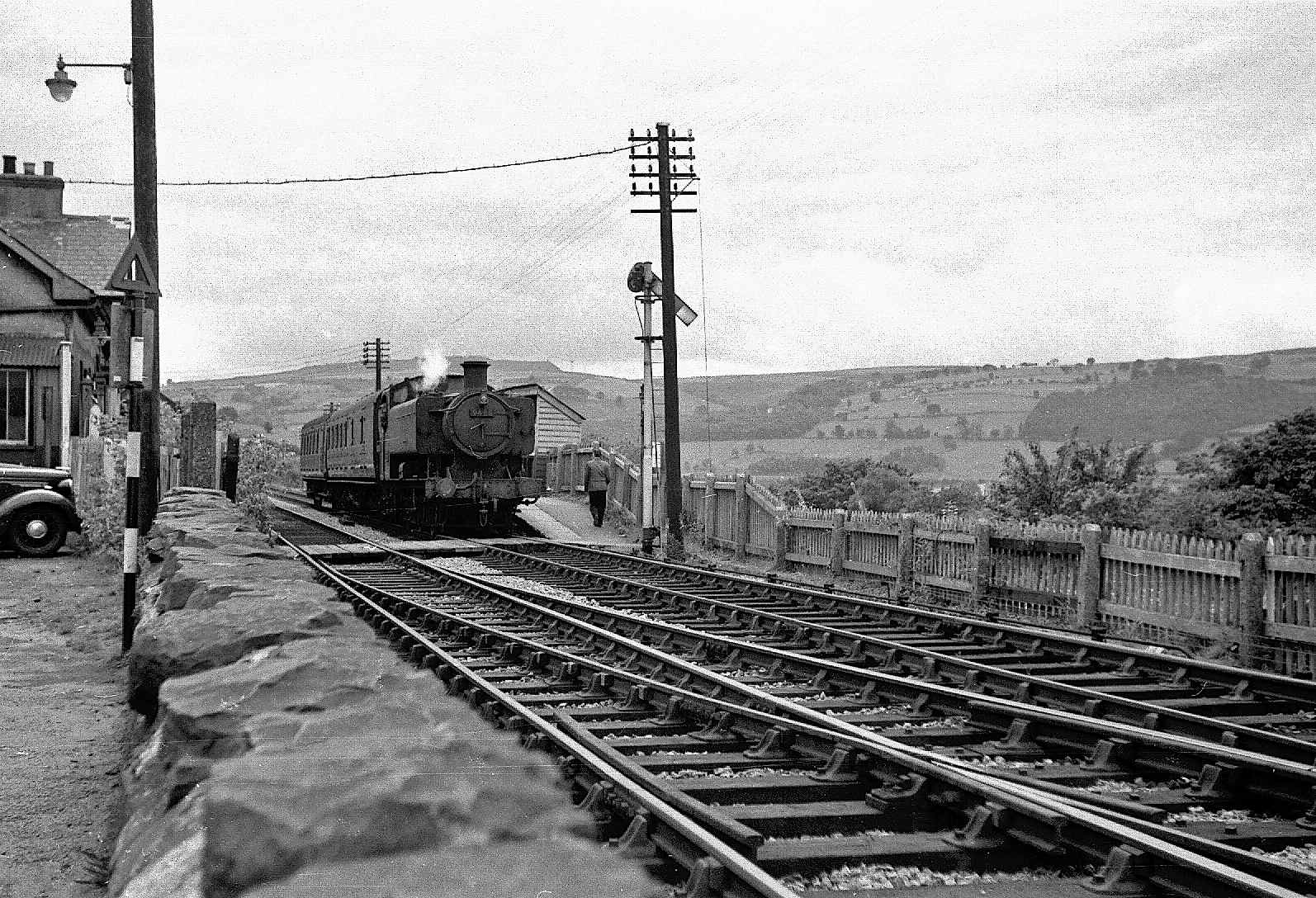
- September 1962

General information
- Location: Maesycwmmer, Caerphilly; Wales
- Grid reference: ST 155948
- Platforms: 2

Other information
- Status: Disused

History
- Original company: Brecon and Merthyr Railway
- Post-grouping: Great Western Railway Western Region of British Railways

Key dates
- 14 June 1865: Opened
- 31 December 1962: Closed
Location

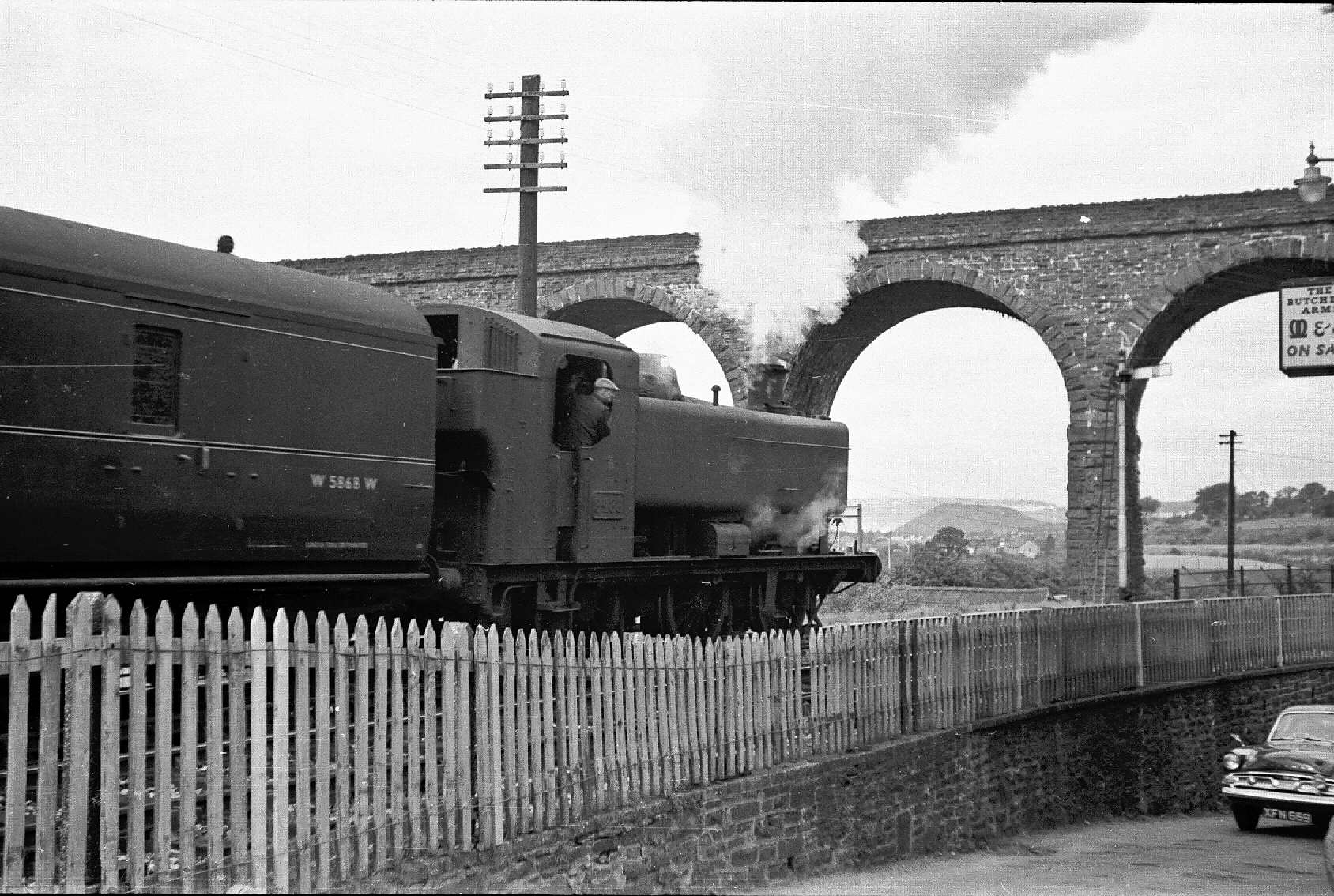
A northbound train leaving Maesycwmmer on 3 September 1962. It is about to pass under the Hengoed Viaduct on the Neath and Pontypool Road railway

Maesycwmmer railway station was situated on the Bassaleg and Bargoed line, serving the adjoining village of Maesycwmmer, which lies on the east bank of the Rhymney River in the historic county of Monmouth. It was located at 12 miles 44 chains (20.2 km) from Newport. The line was built by the Brecon and Merthyr Railway, and passed to the Great Western Railway in 1923 and to British Railways (Western Region) in 1948. The line was double track and the station had simple up and down platforms.

The station opened on 14 June 1865 and all services were withdrawn from 31 December 1962, when this section of line closed completely. The passenger service consisted in the 1960s of about ten trains a day in each direction, of which about half ran to and from Newport. Between 1906 and 1924 the station was named Maesycwmmer & Hengoed as it also served the nearby town of Hengoed on the opposite bank of the Rhymney. The district is still served by Hengoed railway station (formerly ‘Hengoed Low Level’) on the Cardiff – Rhymney branch.

The station was overshadowed by the spectacular 299-yard-long (273 m) Hengoed Viaduct which lies a short distance to the north. This carried the Neath and Pontypool Road section of the Great Western Railway, which closed to passengers in 1964. The viaduct is now part of a pedestrian trail.

== Accident ==
On 10 June 1869, a northbound goods train left Machen at about 11:45 am bound for Pengam. It comprised the 0-6-0 tender locomotive Antelope (built by Slaughter, Gruning & Co. in 1857), hauling about forty wagons including a brake van; proving to be too great a load for the locomotive, most of the wagons were detached at Bedwas. The train left Bedwas at about 12:35 pm with Antelope now hauling five loaded iron ore wagons, three empty wagons and the brake van. Although a goods train, it was carrying some passengers: together with the driver on the locomotive or tender were J. T. Simpson, the B&MR locomotive superintendent; John Kendall, the Rhymney Railway locomotive superintendent; the B&MR inspector of traffic; and a B&MR fitter; whilst in the brake van was a carpenter together with the guard and fireman of the train. The train passed Maesycwmmer at 1:05 pm, and shortly after, whilst passing under the Hengoed Viaduct, it became derailed on a very tight reverse curve. The derailed locomotive ran on for about 60 yards (55 m) then struck a girder supporting an underbridge, causing the girder, locomotive, tender and three ore wagons to fall 14 feet (4.3 m) into the road beneath. Of the five men on the locomotive and tender, Kendall and the driver were both killed, the others seriously injured – Simpson later died of his injuries. The locomotive was also damaged, but was later repaired and returned to traffic, eventually being given the number 7 and withdrawn from service in 1881.

== Routes ==
Preceding station	Disused railways	Following station
Fleur-de-Lis Platform; Line and station closed	Brecon and Merthyr Tydfil Junction Railway; Rumney Railway	Bedwas; Line and station closed
