= Rhiwderin railway station =

Former railway station in Wales

Rhiwderin
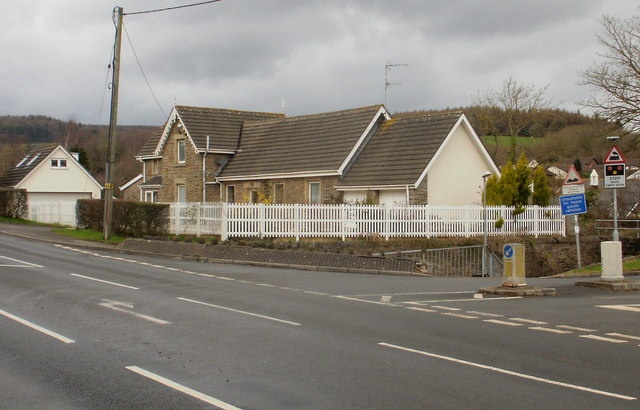
- Privately owned Station House in 2010

General information
- Location: Rhiwderin, Newport; Wales
- Coordinates: 51.5803°N 3.0691°W
- Grid reference: ST260874
- Platforms: 2

Other information
- Status: Disused

History
- Opened: 14 June 1865; 160 years ago
- Original company: Brecon and Merthyr Tydfil Junction Railway

Key dates
- 1 March 1954; 71 years ago: Closed to passengers
- 14 September 1959; 66 years ago: Closed to freight
Location

Rhiwderin railway station served the Welsh village of Rhiwderin near Newport, Wales.

== History and description ==
The station had two platforms with a large stone building on one side and a wooden shelter on the other. The station had no footbridge, and passengers crossed via a level crossing. The station had a signal box, which is now preserved.

Rhiwderin, like the other stations on this section of the line, was relatively successful in its early years, but as the road networks expanded after the 1940s, its profitability declined. The station proved an early casualty of the blow dealt to the local passenger stations in South Wales by bus services, closing to passengers in 1954 and to freight in 1959.

== After closure ==
As of 2017, the line is still in a functional condition, and sees occasional traffic from Machen Quarry, but there is no longer a passenger station in the area. Rhiwderin station is now a private residence, though much of its original character has been retained. The station signal box was acquired in 1967 by the Caerphilly Railway Society. It is now preserved on the Teifi Valley Railway.

Preceding station	Disused railways	Following station
Church Road; Line and station closed	Brecon and Merthyr Tydfil Junction Railway; Rumney Railway	Bassaleg; Line and station closed
