= Gwernydomen Halt railway station =

Former railway station in Wales

Gwernydomen Halt

General information
- Location: Caerphilly; Wales
- Coordinates: 51.5838°N 3.1897°W
- Grid reference: ST177879
- Platforms: 1

Other information
- Status: Disused

History
- Original company: Brecon and Merthyr Tydfil Junction Railway
- Post-grouping: Great Western Railway

Key dates
- October 1908: opened
- 17 September 1956: closed
Location

Gwernydomen Halt railway station (sometimes spelt Gwern-y-Domen) was a small rural halt in South Wales, northeast from Caerphilly. It operated until 1956.

== History and description ==
The halt was opened in 1908. It was a very basic affair, being without a platform, and consisting just of a fenced enclosure and a signboard, though did have the benefit of a single lamp. When the line was built through the location, an ancient motte was damaged by the building work.

The halt closed in 1956, when passenger services over the former Pontypridd, Caerphilly and Newport Railway were withdrawn. Little trace remains of it today, and the trackbed has been reclaimed by nature. By 1996, only a cleared area of trees and the abutments of a disused bridge marked the spot.

Preceding station	Disused railways	Following station
Caerphilly; Line closed, station open	Brecon and Merthyr Tydfil Junction Railway; Pontypridd, Caerphilly and Newport Railway; Up services only	Fountain Bridge Halt; Line and station closed
Caerphilly; Line closed, station open	Brecon and Merthyr Tydfil Junction Railway; Pontypridd, Caerphilly and Newport Railway; Down services only	Waterloo Halt; Line and station closed
