= Fountain Bridge Halt railway station =

Disused railway station in Wales

Fountain Bridge Halt

General information
- Location: Rudry, Caerphilly; Wales
- Coordinates: 51.589521°N 3.1691608°W
- Grid reference: ST191885
- Platforms: 1

Other information
- Status: Disused

History
- Original company: Brecon and Merthyr Tydfil Junction Railway

Key dates
- October 1908: Opened
- 17 September 1956: Closed
Location

Fountain Bridge Halt was a small halt which served the community of Rudry in Caerphilly, South Wales. It opened in 1908 and closed in 1956.

The halt was situated on the Machen Loop Line, and as such, was served only by 'up' trains. Correspondingly, Waterloo Halt served the same community, though catered only for 'down' services.

The halt had a ground-level platform, and was provided with only a lamp and a name board. Passengers were confined to a gated enclosure behind the platform, which was unlocked by the conductor on the train's arrival. The halt closed in 1956 when passenger services (already reduced to three a day) were withdrawn. The route is still present, but the site is now overgrown, with the trackbed having become waterlogged, and the bridge over the River Rhymney just beyond the halt has long been dismantled.

Preceding station	Disused railways	Following station
Gwernydomen Halt; Line and station closed	Brecon and Merthyr Tydfil Junction Railway; Pontypridd, Caerphilly and Newport Railway; Up services only	White Hart Halt; Line and station closed
