= Waterloo Halt railway station =

Former railway station in Wales

Waterloo Halt
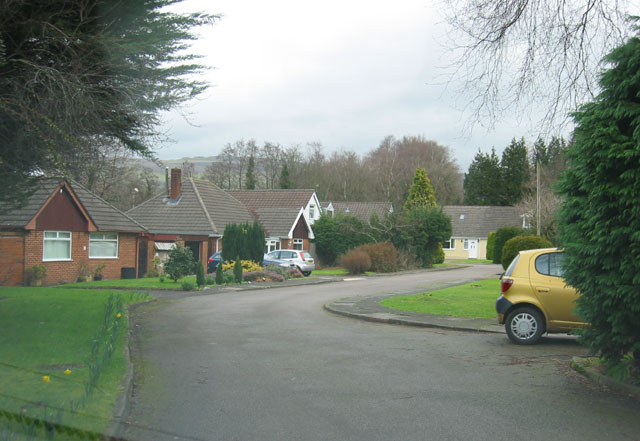
- Former site of the halt

General information
- Location: Rudry, Caerphilly; Wales
- Coordinates: 51.587781°N 3.1633423°W
- Grid reference: ST195883
- Platforms: 1

Other information
- Status: Disused

History
- Original company: Brecon and Merthyr Tydfil Junction Railway

Key dates
- October 1908: Opened
- 17 September 1956: Closed
Location

Waterloo Halt railway station was a small halt which served the community of Rudry in Caerphilly, South Wales between 1908 and 1956.

Like other halts on the line, Waterloo was very basic, consisting of a single ground-level platform made from sleepers, a name-board and one lamp (though the halt did have a second lamp for at least some of its later life). There was no shelter, with passengers being confined to a fenced enclosure, whose gate to the platform would be unlocked by the guard when the train arrived.

Located on the original Brecon & Merthyr Loop Line (as opposed to the second line which was built later by the Pontypridd, Caerphilly and Newport Railway), Waterloo Halt was served by 'down' services only. Fountain Bridge Halt on the opposite side of the river (on the PN&CR line) was served by the 'up' trains.

The halt closed in 1956 when the passenger service was withdrawn. The site is now the garden of a private residence.

Preceding station	Disused railways	Following station
Gwernydomen Halt; Line and station closed	Brecon and Merthyr Tydfil Junction Railway; Pontypridd, Caerphilly and Newport Railway; Down services only	White Hart Halt; Line and station closed
