= Machen railway station =

Former railway station in Wales

Machen

General information
- Location: Machen, Caerphilly County Borough; Wales
- Coordinates: 51.597896°N 3.1405004°W
- Grid reference: ST211894
- Platforms: 2

Other information
- Status: Disused

History
- Original company: Brecon and Merthyr Tydfil Junction Railway

Key dates
- 1865: Opened
- 31 December 1962: Closed to passengers
- 16 July 1964: Closed to freight
Location

Machen railway station was an interchange junction in Caerphilly County Borough, South Wales. It was large and substantial compared with many other stations in the vicinity.

== History and description ==
The passenger facilities at Machen comprised two platforms with a booking office, waiting-room and goods-shed, with a shelter also provided on the 'down' platform. The Pontypridd, Caerphilly and Newport Railway Act 1887 (50 & 51 Vict. c. clxxvi) (the Machen Loop Act 1887) authorised the Pontypridd, Caerphilly and Newport Railway to double the B&MTJR's Caerphilly branch. Accordingly, a new 'down' line was laid on a divergent route to Machen from Gwaun-y-Bara Junction. The former single line became the new 'up' line, and came into use in 1891. The PC&NR opened to passenger services in 1904. After Machen became a junction, it had many sidings, some of which were used by local businessmen. The local collier's trains were always parked in the north siding. Machen also had a carriage works, built originally in 1870 and expanded in 1900, 1911 and 1922. Apart from repairing railway stock, it also trained apprentices in many fields of engineering. The works closed in c. 1927.

== Closure and after ==
The service between Machen and Pontypridd was withdrawn in 1956. The remaining passenger services at Machen ceased in 1962 and freight closure followed in 1964. By 1996, this once-important station was still standing, but in an advanced state of decay.

Preceding station	Disused railways	Following station
Trethomas; Line and station closed	Brecon and Merthyr Tydfil Junction Railway; Rumney Railway	Church Road; Line and station closed
White Hart Halt; Line and station closed	Brecon and Merthyr Tydfil Junction Railway; Pontypridd, Caerphilly and Newport Railway	Church Road; Line and station closed
