= Church Road railway station (Wales) =

Former railway station in Wales

Church Road (B&MJR)
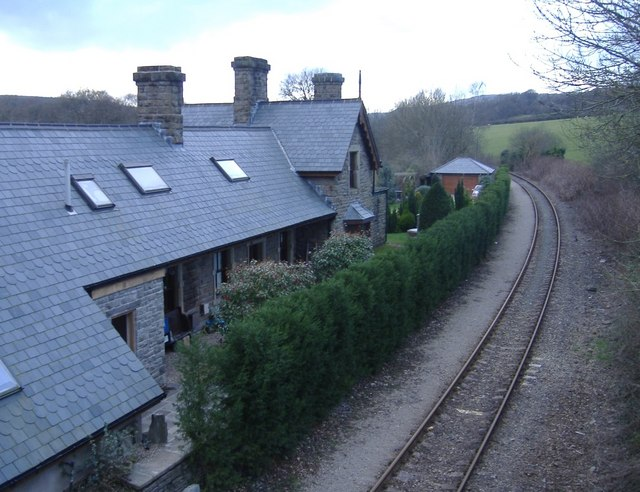
- The station building, now a private residence

General information
- Location: Lower Machen, Newport; Wales
- Coordinates: 51.5885°N 3.1123°W
- Grid reference: ST219883
- Platforms: 2

Other information
- Status: Disused

History
- Original company: Brecon and Merthyr Tydfil Junction Railway

Key dates
- 14 June 1865: Opened
- 16 September 1957: Closed
Location

Church Road railway station served the hamlet of Lower Machen in Newport, Wales.

== History and description ==
The station had two platforms. There was a substantial stone building on one, with the other supplied with only a shelter. Initially a small and insignificant halt (though the suffix 'halt' did not begin appearing until the 1900s), Church Road grew in importance and a telephone kiosk was installed in 1891, together with the larger waiting room. For many years, the station's flowerbeds had its name spelt out in bedding plants.

The station's patronage slumped in the post-war years. It closed to both passengers and freight in 1957, having been unstaffed for a number of years. The larger station building is now a private residence, though the second platform was gone by 1974.

Preceding station	Disused railways	Following station
Machen; Line and station closed	Brecon and Merthyr Tydfil Junction Railway; Rumney Railway	Rhiwderin; Line and station closed
