= Trethomas railway station =

Disused railway station in Trethomas, Monmouthshire

Trethomas
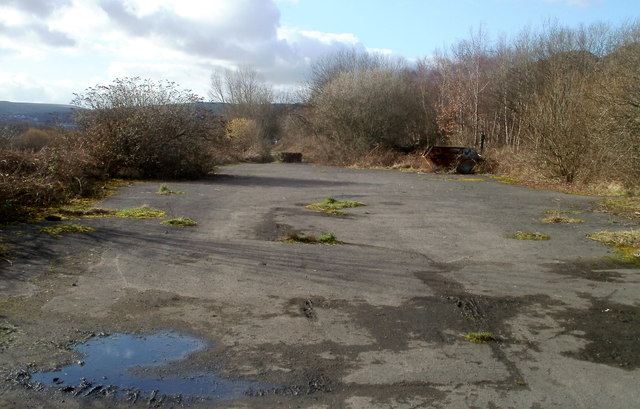
- The site of the station in 2011

General information
- Location: Trethomas, Caerphilly; Wales
- Coordinates: 51.5948°N 3.1765°W
- Grid reference: ST186891
- Platforms: 2

Other information
- Status: Disused

History
- Original company: Brecon and Merthyr Tydfil Junction Railway
- Pre-grouping: Brecon and Merthyr Tydfil Junction Railway
- Post-grouping: Great Western Railway

Key dates
- 4 January 1915: Opened
- 31 December 1962: Closed
Location

Trethomas railway station served the village of Trethomas, Caerphilly, Wales, from 1915 to 1962 on the Brecon and Merthyr Tydfil Junction Railway.

== History ==
The station opened on 4 January 1915 by the Brecon and Merthyr Tydfil Junction Railway, although it first appeared in Bradshaw in July of the same year. It closed on 31 December 1962. The site is now a cycle path.

Preceding station	Disused railways	Following station
Bedwas; Line and station closed	Brecon and Merthyr Tydfil Junction Railway; Rumney Railway	Machen; Line and station closed
