= Aber Bargoed railway station =

Disused railway station in Caerphilly, Wales

Aber Bargoed
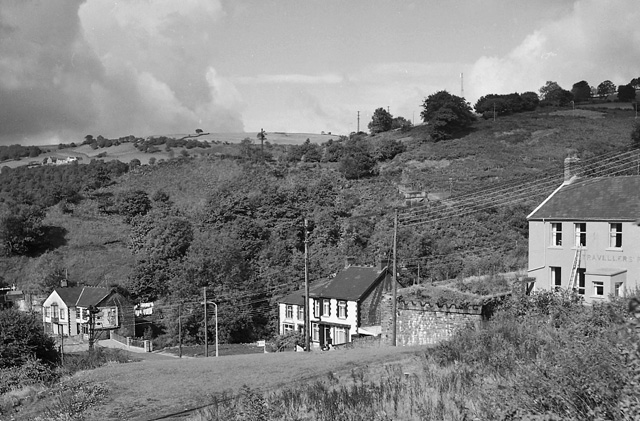
- Site of Aberbargoed Station in 1973

General information
- Location: Aberbargoed, Caerphilly; Wales
- Coordinates: 51.69599°N 3.22880°W
- Platforms: 1

Other information
- Status: Disused

History
- Original company: Brecon and Merthyr Tydfil Junction Railway
- Pre-grouping: Brecon and Merthyr Tydfil Junction Railway
- Post-grouping: Great Western Railway

Key dates
- 16 March 1866: Station opens
- October 1869: Station closes
- March 1870: Station reopens
- 1 September 1905: Station renamed Aber Bargoed and Bargoed
- 1 March 1909: Station renamed Bargoed and Aber Bargoed
- 1 July 1924: Station renamed Aberbargoed
- 31 December 1962: Station closes
Location

Aber Bargoed railway station was a small railway station in the valleys north of Cardiff. Opened as Aber Bargoed by the Brecon & Merthyr Junction Railway, the station went through several changes of name before closure. Despite the similarity in the name it is not the Bargoed station now open on the line to Rhymney.

== History ==
The station was incorporated into the Great Western Railway during the Grouping of 1923, Passing on to the Western Region of British Railways on nationalisation in 1948, it was then closed by British Railways.

== The site today ==
The site is now partly an open space, and partly the route of the Bargoed Bypass road.

| Preceding station | Disused railways | Following station |
|---|---|---|
| Cwmsyfiog & Brithdir; Line and station closed | Brecon and Merthyr Tydfil Junction Railway; Rumney Railway | Bargoed Colliery Halt; Line and station closed |
