= Pengam railway station =

Railway station in Caerphilly, Wales

Pengam
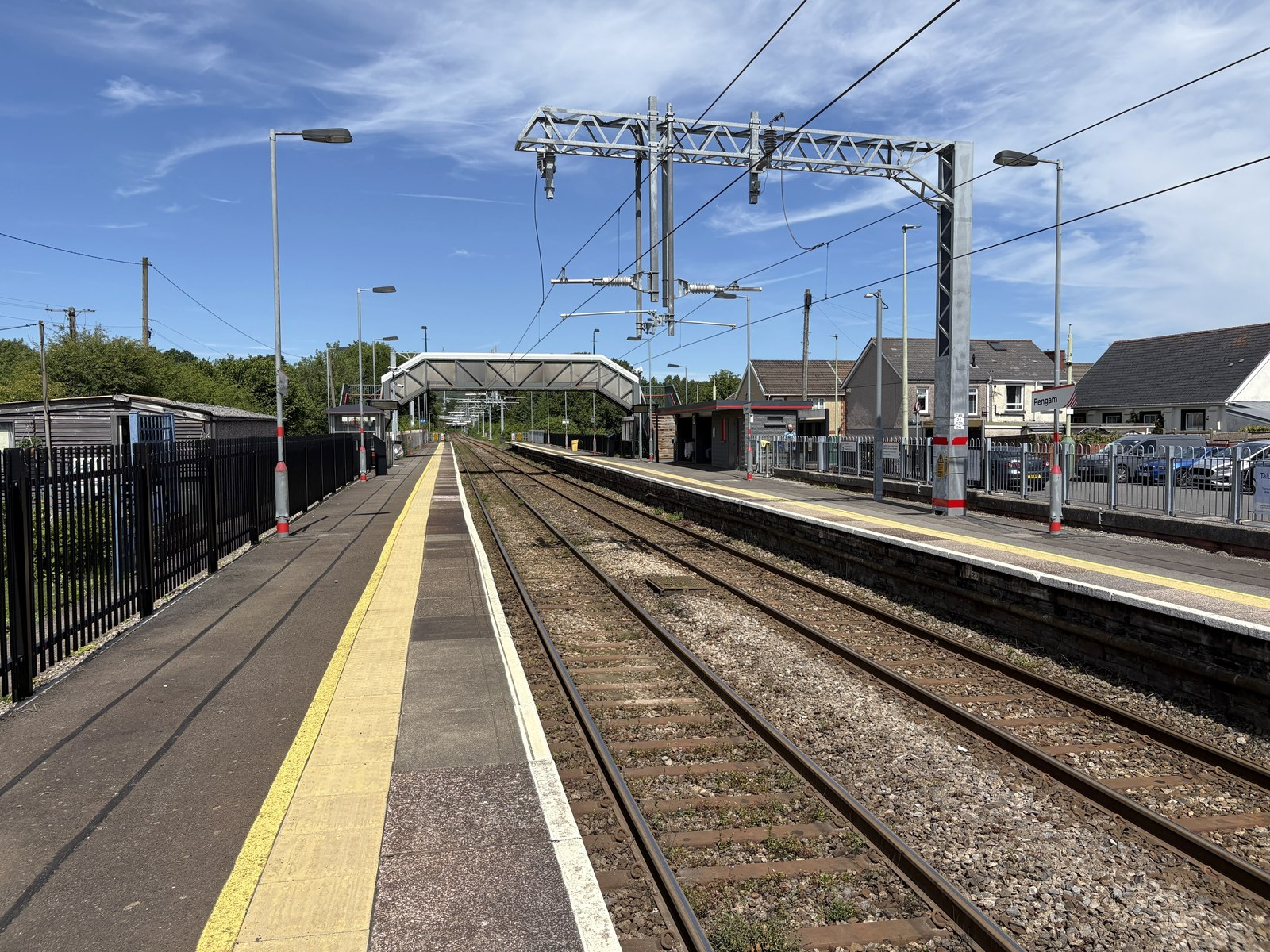

General information
- Location: Glan-y-nant, Caerphilly; Wales
- Coordinates: 51°40′12″N 3°13′48″W
- Grid reference: ST150975
- Manager: Transport for Wales
- Platforms: 2

Other information
- Station code: PGM
- Classification: DfT category F2

History
- Opened: 31 March 1858

Passengers
- 2021/22: ▲0.125 million
- 2022/23: ▲0.189 million
- 2023/24: ▲0.211 million
- 2024/25: ▲0.214 million
- 2025/26: ▼0.148 million
Location
Notes
- Passenger statistics from the Office of Rail and Road

Pengam railway station is situated in Pengam on the Rhymney Line of the Valley Lines network in South Wales. It is also the nearest station to the town of Blackwood. It is 16 miles 30 chains (26.4 km) from Cardiff (Bute East Dock), near Cardiff Bay, and is between Hengoed and Gilfach Fargoed. The station is managed by Transport for Wales Rail, who operate all services.

== History ==
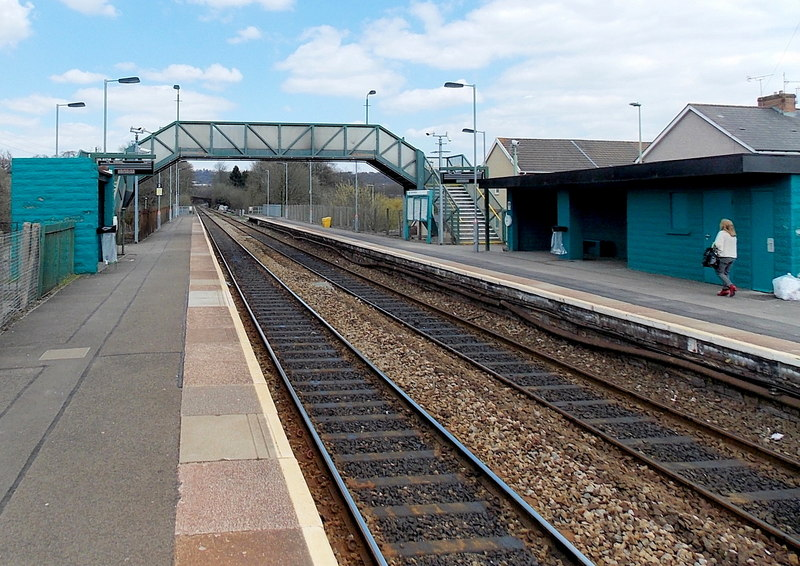
The station seen in 2013

The station opened on 31 March 1858. Between 1 February 1909 and 1 July 1924, the station was named Pengam & Fleur-de-lis, and was also named Pengam Glam between 29 March 1926 and 6 May 1968.

The station was a short walk from the former Pengam (Mon) station.

In January 2020, a Transport for Wales service caught fire at the station after a heater overheated.

The line through the station was electrified in late 2025.

== Facilities ==
The station previously had an independently-run ticket office, one of 21 stations in the country as of 2018. It closed during Covid-19, then reopened (this time run by Transport for Wales staff). However, the ticket office has been permanently closed since 2023.

The station has ticket machines, a car park, shelters, help points, cycle storage and live departure screens.

== Passenger volume ==
The station is the second busiest station on the Rhymney Line, after Caerphilly.

Passenger volume at Pengam
	2004–05	2005–06	2006–07	2007–08	2008–09	2009–10	2010–11	2011–12	2012–13	2013–14	2014–15	2015–16	2016–17	2017–18	2018–19	2019–20	2020–21	2021–22	2022–23	2023–24	2024–25
Entries and exits	375,494	397,569	426,341	485,195	469,688	457,734	450,990	464,464	448,000	460,970	469,052	471,778	490,342	461,066	473,760	423,128	32,616	125,188	189,282	210,680	214,248

The statistics cover twelve month periods that start in April.

== Services ==
Monday to Saturday daytime train services have four trains per hour in each direction. Northbound, there are two trains per hour that terminate at Bargoed, and two trains per hour that continues to Rhymney. Southbound, there are three trains per hour to Barry Island, and an hourly service to Bridgend via Rhoose Cardiff International Airport.

Evening northbound services have a half-hourly service to Rhymney. Evening southbound services have an hourly service to Barry Island and Bridgend. On Sundays, the train service will run hourly between Rhymney and Barry Island, one northbound service continues to Rhymney and one southbound service continues to Barry Island.

The Class 231, Class 150 and Class 153 trains operates to Barry Island and the Class 150 and Class 153 trains operates to Bridgend.

Preceding station	National Rail	Following station
Hengoed	Transport for Wales; Rhymney Line	Gilfach Fargoed

== Bibliography ==
- Marshall, Geoff; Pipe, Vicki (2018). The Railway Adventures: Places, Trains, People and Stations. September Publishing. ISBN 978-1910463871.
- Quick, Michael (2023). Railway Passenger Stations in Great Britain: A Chronology (PDF) (5th ed.). London: Railway and Canal Historical Society.
