= Gilfach Fargoed railway station =

Railway station in Caerphilly, Wales

Gilfach Fargoed
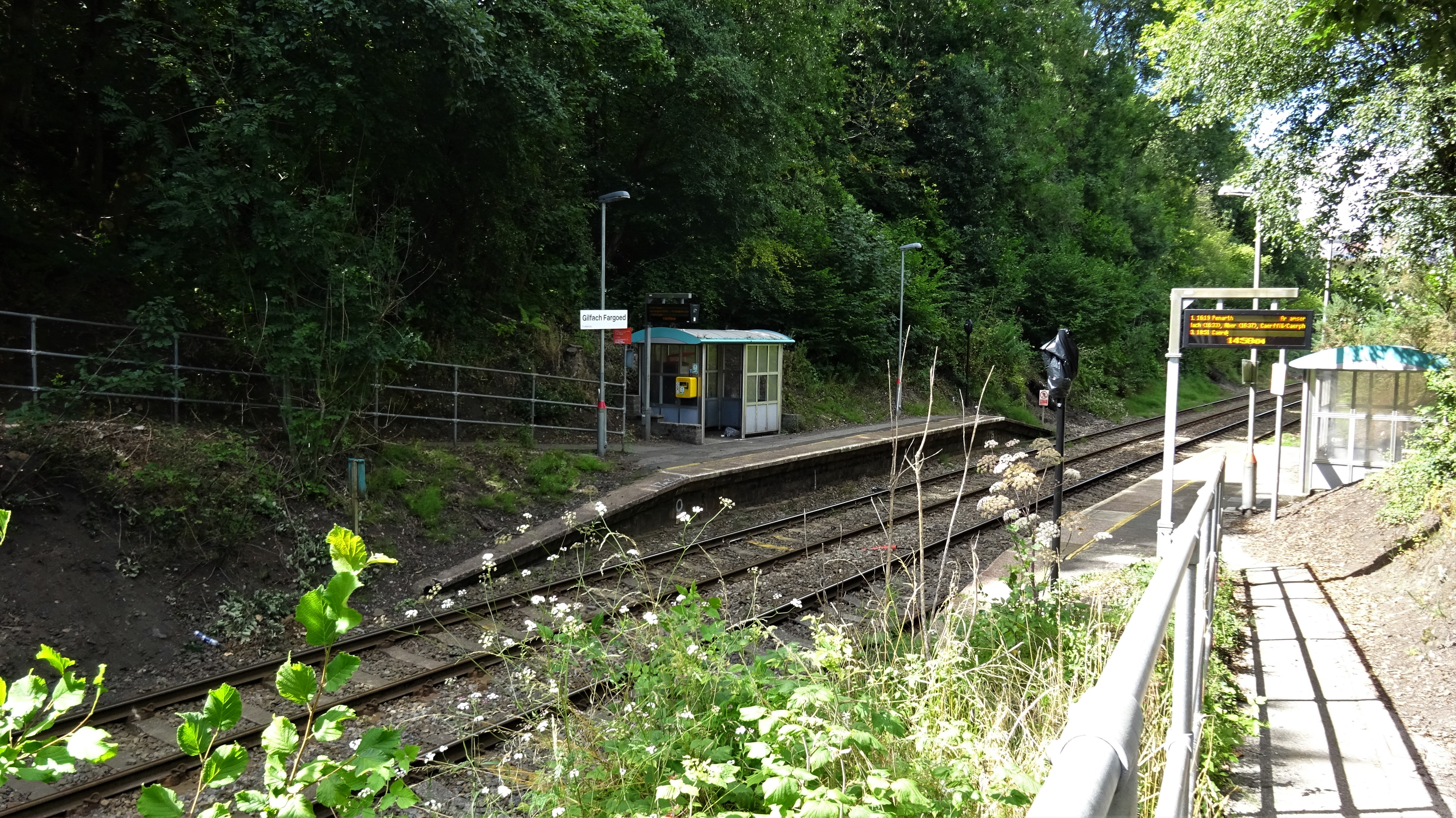

General information
- Location: Gilfach, Caerphilly; Wales
- Coordinates: 51°41′03″N 3°13′39″W
- Grid reference: ST152990
- Manager: Transport for Wales
- Platforms: 2

Other information
- Station code: GFF
- Classification: DfT category F2

Key dates
- April 1908: Opened
- 6 July 2020: Temporarily closed
- 21 August 2021: Reopened

Passengers
- 2021/22: ▲1,158
- 2022/23: ▲3,902
- 2023/24: ▲4,096
- 2024/25: ▲5,142
- 2025/26: ▲5,756
Location
Notes
- Passenger statistics from the Office of Rail and Road

Gilfach Fargoed railway station is a railway station serving the village of Gilfach, in Caerphilly county borough, south Wales. It is a stop on the Rhymney Line of the Valley Lines network.

The platforms are short (16 m or 52 ft) and can barely accommodate a British Rail Class 153 train, due to its small size it is affectionately nicknamed "Gilfach International". Passengers can only alight from the front doors of any train calling here, so the conductor on longer trains must give passengers advance notice so that they have time to move towards the front set of doors.

== History ==
Built as a halt by the Rhymney Railway in 1908 for recently introduced steam railmotors, some 50 years after the line first opened. Although very close, the halt did not serve the Brecon and Merthyr Railway which passed behind, on its way to Bargoed south Junction.

Due to the platforms not being long enough to accommodate social distancing measures introduced because of the COVID-19 pandemic, the station was temporarily closed between 6 July 2020 and 21 August 2021.

== Services ==
The Monday to Saturday service pattern is one train an hour southbound to Cardiff Central and Barry Island. Northbound one train an hour runs to Bargoed.

On Sundays, the service pattern is one train an hour southbound to Cardiff Central and Barry Island, and one an hour northbound to Rhymney.

Preceding station	National Rail	Following station
Pengam	Transport for Wales; Rhymney Line	Bargoed
