= Bedwas railway station =

Disused railway station in Bedwas, Caerphilly

Bedwas
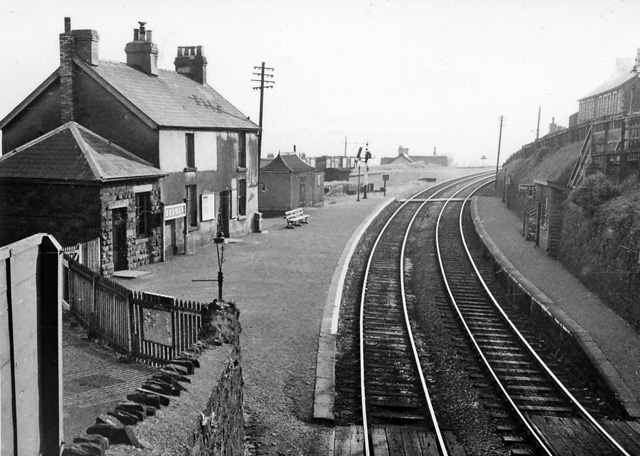
- The station in 1962

General information
- Location: Bedwas, Monmouthshire; Wales
- Coordinates: 51.5953°N 3.2000°W
- Grid reference: ST169891
- Platforms: 2

Other information
- Status: Disused

History
- Original company: Brecon and Merthyr Tydfil Junction Railway
- Pre-grouping: Brecon and Merthyr Tydfil Junction Railway
- Post-grouping: Great Western Railway

Key dates
- 14 June 1865: Opened
- 31 December 1962: Closed to passengers
- 6 April 1965: Closed to goods
Location

Bedwas railway station served the village of Bedwas, Monmouthshire, Wales, from 1865 to 1965 on the Brecon and Merthyr Tydfil Junction Railway.

== History ==
The station opened on 14 June 1865 by the Brecon and Merthyr Tydfil Junction Railway. It closed to passengers on 31 December 1962 and closed to goods traffic on 6 April 1965.

Preceding station	Disused railways	Following station
Llanbradach Colliery Halt; Line and station closed	Brecon and Merthyr Tydfil Junction Railway; Rumney Railway	Trethomas; Line and station closed
