= Fleur-de-Lis Platform railway station =

Disused railway station in Fleur-de-lis, Caerphilly

Fleur-de-Lis

General information
- Location: Fleur-de-lis, Glamorganshire; Wales
- Coordinates: 51.663°N 3.2224°W
- Grid reference: ST155967
- Platforms: 2

Other information
- Status: Disused

History
- Original company: Great Western Railway

Key dates
- 29 March 1926: Opened
- 31 December 1962: Closed
Location

Fleur-de-Lis Platform railway station served the village of Fleur-de-lis, in the historical county of Glamorganshire, Wales, from 1926 to 1962 on the Rumney Railway.

== History ==
The station was opened on 29 March 1926 by the Great Western Railway. It closed on 31 December 1962.

Preceding station	Disused railways	Following station
Pengam; Line and station closed	Great Western Railway; Rumney Railway	Maesycwmmer and Hengoed; Line and station closed
