= White Hart Halt railway station =

Former railway station in Wales

White Hart Halt

General information
- Location: Caerphilly; Wales
- Coordinates: 51.5956°N 3.1505°W
- Grid reference: ST205891
- Platforms: 1

Other information
- Status: Disused

History
- Original company: GWR

Key dates
- 12 May 1947: opened
- 30 June 1952: closed
Location

White Hart Halt was a short-lived railway halt in South Wales.

The halt was situated near the White Hart Inn. It was on both the 'up' and 'down' sections of the Pontypridd, Caerphilly and Newport Machen loop line.

The halt had a single ground-level platform with a wooden shelter, and a basic level crossing over the single line to give access to the shelter, which was on the side of the track furthest the road. The station was not staffed.

White Hart Halt closed on 30 June 1952. Little trace remains. The embankment which carried the line is still in existence, but is badly overgrown, making any remaining traces difficult to glimpse.

Preceding station	Disused railways	Following station
Fountain Bridge Halt; Line and station closed	Great Western Railway; Pontypridd, Caerphilly and Newport Railway; Up services only	Machen; Line and station closed
Waterloo Halt; Line and station closed	Great Western Railway; Pontypridd, Caerphilly and Newport Railway; Down services only	Machen; Line and station closed
