= Thomas Savin =

British railway engineer (1826–1889)

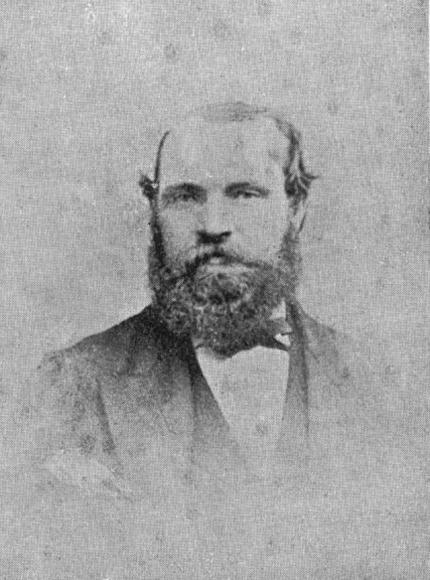
- Born: 1826
- Died: 23 July 1889 (aged 62–63); Oswestry, Shropshire, England, United Kingdom

Thomas Savin (1826 – 23 July 1889) was a British railway engineer who was the contractor who built many railways in Wales and the Welsh borders from 1857 to 1866. He also in some cases was an investor in such schemes.

== Early life ==
Savin was born in Shropshire at Llwynymaen near Oswestry in 1826. He married in 1852 Eliza Hughes with whom he had two sons who survived him. He initially worked in Oswestry running a mercery business in partnership with Edward Morris, who subsequently purchased and then sold the Van lead mines.

== Railway contractor ==
In 1857 Savin formed a partnership with David Davies to build the Vale of Clwyd Railway. The partnership was the principal contractor for many of the lines that became the Cambrian Railways. The partnership was dissolved in 1860. He also had an interest in or worked on a number of secondary and minor railways, including the Oswestry and Newtown Railway, Brecon and Merthyr Tydfil Junction Railway, the Hereford, Hay and Brecon Railway, the narrow gauge Corris Railway, the Kington & Eardisley Railway, the Bishop's Castle Railway. and Aberystwith and Welsh Coast Railway which connected the interior of mid-Wales from Machynlleth to the coast with the completion of the line and the opening of Aberystwyth station in 1864, and became part of the Cambrian Railways in 1865.

Savin followed up the opening of the last-named line with the creation of Aberystwyth's Castle Hotel to capitalise on the local seaside trade. He bought Castle House and converted it into a large hotel. He produced 'probably the first package holiday deal' whereby tickets bought by passengers at various railway stations in parts of England would entitle the buyer not only to the journey to and from Aberystwyth but board and lodging at the resort. It was opened in June 1865 while still incomplete but he had to stop work after £80,000 had been spent on it when he became bankrupt amid the failure of Overend, Gurney in 1866, at which point his enterprises involved a total of about £1.5 million. It was sold for £10,000 in March 1867 when it was purchased to become the first building for the University College of Wales.

== Industry ==
Savin owned a number of industrial companies across Wales. He owned a colliery, The New British Coalpit, at Coed-y-go, served by a branch line he built privately off the Oswestry & Newtown line, which carried twenty wagons of coal daily each way before the colliery closed in 1869.

He was the owner of the Cooper's Lime Rocks limestone quarry at Porthywaen in 1872, which suffered from a significant accident. Kegs of gunpowder were hauled up the incline to the magazine in the quarry. As the most recent set of kegs were being moved into the magazine, an empty wagon broke loose and collided at high speed with one of the kegs. The resulting explosion killed six workers employed by Savin.

== Politics and other interests ==
David Davies had entered active politics in 1865 when he unsuccessfully fought at Cardiganshire in the General Election. Later that year Savin was briefly mentioned as a possible Liberal candidate for Brecon. Savin served in local politics in Oswestry, to whose borough council he was elected in 1856, became Mayor of the town in 1866, and was alderman from 1871 until his death. He left the Liberal party and became a Conservative because of his support for Benjamin Disraeli's stance over Bulgaria and Turkey against Russia in the 1870s.

Savin served in the volunteer force as lieutenant in the Montgomeryshire Rifles and was captain of the 15th (Oswestry) company of the Shropshire Rifle Volunteers in 1864. He was also a Fellow of the Royal Horticultural Society and Associate Member of the Institution of Civil Engineers.

== Bankruptcy ==
On 5 February 1866 Savin declared himself bankrupt, in part because he could not pay civil engineering contractors for a canal wharf he built to increase output from his limestone quarries. His debts amounted to over £2 million (equivalent to £210,000,000 in 2025). His railway shares were sold to pay his debt to the principal creditor, the Joint Stock Discount Company, to which he owed £160,000. When his bankruptcy was discharged he remained in control only of four small quarrying companies.

== Later life ==
Savin died at his home, Ivy House, in Salop Road, Oswestry on 23 July 1889, aged 63, and was buried in Oswestry Cemetery on 26 July (Section D, Grave 34).

== Bibliography ==
- Gasquoine, C. P.; The Story of the Cambrian – a biography of a railway; Woodall, Minshall, Thomas & Co, 1922
- Johnson, Peter; An Illustrated History of the Great Western Narrow Gauge; Oxford Publishing Co, 2011 (Savin's involvement with the Corris Railway)
- Williams, Herbert; Davies the Ocean – railway king and coal tycoon; University of Wales Press, 1991
