= Bargoed railway station =

Railway station in Caerphilly, Wales

Bargoed Welsh: Bargod
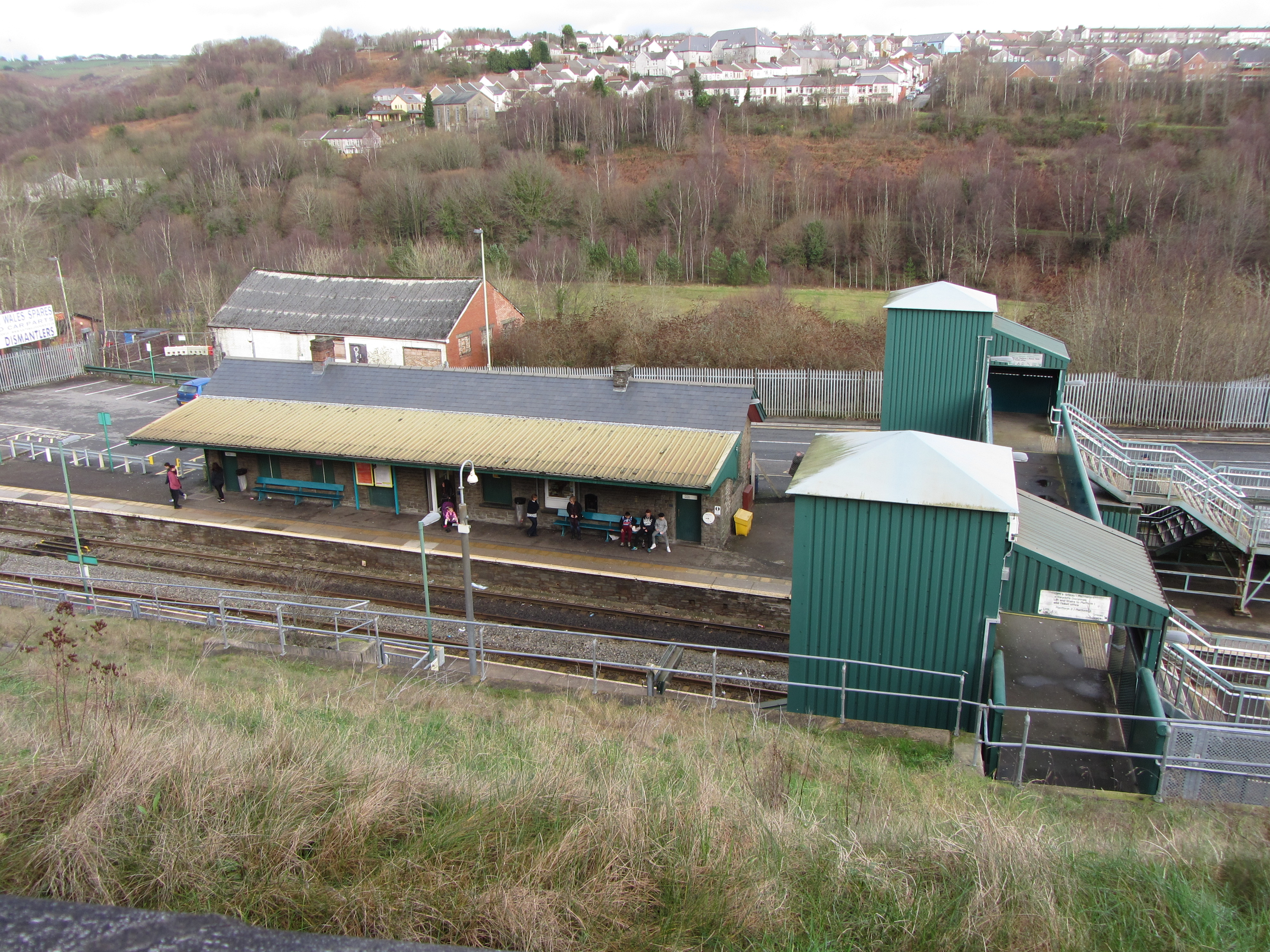

General information
- Location: Bargoed, Caerphilly; Wales
- Coordinates: 51°41′34″N 3°13′48″W
- Grid reference: SO150000
- Manager: Transport for Wales
- Platforms: 2

Other information
- Station code: BGD
- Classification: DfT category E

History
- Opened: 1858

Key dates
- September 2013: Signal box closed

Passengers
- 2021/22: ▲99,540
- 2022/23: ▲0.148 million
- 2023/24: ▲0.168 million
- 2024/25: ▲0.188 million
- 2025/26: ▼0.134 million
Location
Notes
- Passenger statistics from the Office of Rail and Road

Bargoed railway station serves the town of Bargoed in the county borough of Caerphilly, South Wales. It is a stop on the Rhymney Line of the Valley Lines network and is located a three-minute walk to the Bargoed Interchange bus station.

== History ==
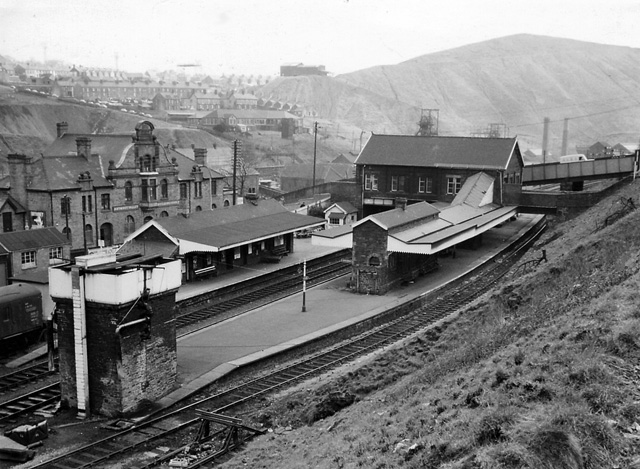
Bargoed Station in 1965

The station was opened on 31 March 1858 by the Rhymney Railway and was once a busy junction, serving lines to Newport (via Bedwas) and Brecon (the Brecon and Merthyr Tydfil Junction Railway), as well as the current route. However, the lines to Bedwas and Brecon were both closed to passengers on 31 December 1962, and completely in 1963–5. The junction site and trackbed of the old Brecon line are still visible north of the station.

In 1905, it was renamed Bargoed and Aber Bargoed, before reverting to its original name in 1924. Another similarly named station, Aber Bargoed, was opened by the Brecon & Merthyr Junction Railway and located on the now-defunct Newport line north of Bargoed South Junction.

== Facilities ==
The station previously had a ticket office run independently of Transport for Wales Rail. However, the ticket office has since closed. There is a ticket machine, toilet, help points, car park, waiting rooms and live departure screens.

== Services ==
The typical Monday to Saturday daytime service pattern consists of four trains per hour southbound to Cardiff Central: three continue to Barry Island and one to Bridgend. Northbound, two trains per hour run to Rhymney, one skipping intermediate stations. The frequency decreases in the evening.

On Sundays, the service pattern is one train per hour southbound to Cardiff Central and Barry Island, and one per hour northbound to Rhymney.

Preceding station	National Rail	Following station
Gilfach Fargoed or Pengam	Transport for Wales; Rhymney Line	Brithdir or Rhymney
	Disused railways	
Groesfaen Colliery Platform; Line and station closed	Brecon and Merthyr Tydfil Junction Railway	Pengam; Line and station closed

== Bibliography ==
- Marshall, Geoff; Pipe, Vicki (2018). The Railway Adventures: Places, Trains, People and Stations. September Publishing. ISBN 978-1910463871.
