= Pengam (Mon) railway station =

Disused railway station in Pengam, Caerphilly, Wales

Pengam (Mon)
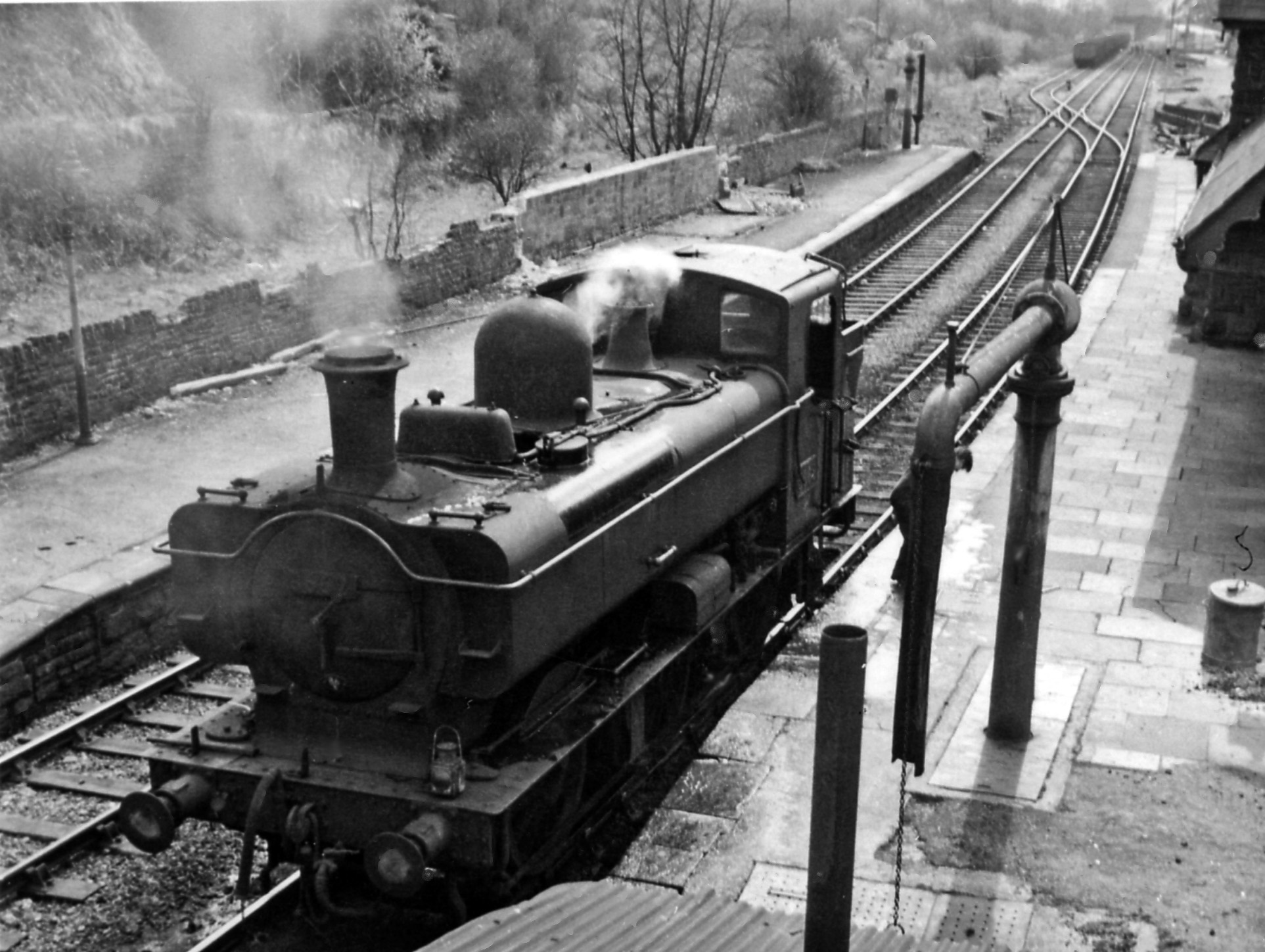
- The station, looking south towards Maes-y-Cwmmer, in 1965

General information
- Location: Pengam, Monmouthshire; Wales
- Coordinates: 51.6707°N 3.2201°W
- Grid reference: ST157975
- Platforms: 2

Other information
- Status: Disused

History
- Original company: Brecon and Merthyr Tydfil Junction Railway
- Pre-grouping: Brecon and Merthyr Tydfil Junction Railway
- Post-grouping: Great Western Railway

Key dates
- 14 June 1865: Opened as Pengam
- 1 February 1909: Name changed to Pengam and Fleur-de-Lis
- 1 July 1924: Name changed to Fleur-de-Lis
- 29 March 1926: Name changed to Pengam (Mon)
- 31 December 1962: Closed
Location

Pengam (Mon) railway station served the village of Pengam, historically in Monmouthshire, Wales, from 1865 to 1962 on the Brecon and Merthyr Tydfil Junction Railway.

== History ==
The station was opened as Pengam on 14 June 1865 by the Brecon and Merthyr Tydfil Junction Railway. Its name was changed to Pengam and Fleur-de-Lis on 1 February 1909, changed to Fleur-de-Lis on 1 July 1924 and changed again to Pengam (Mon) on 29 March 1926 to avoid confusion with Fleur-de-Lis Platform, which opened on the same day. The station closed on 31 December 1962, although it remained open to goods for a few more years.

Preceding station	Disused railways	Following station
Bargoed Colliery Halt; Line and station closed	Brecon and Merthyr Tydfil Junction Railway; Rumney Railway	Fleur-de-Lis Platform; Line and station closed
Bargoed; Line closed, station open	Brecon and Merthyr Tydfil Junction Railway; Rumney Railway	Fleur-de-Lis Platform; Line and station closed
