= Pontypridd, Caerphilly and Newport Railway =

Former railway in Wales

The Pontypridd, Caerphilly and Newport Railway was built to bring the coal output of the Aberdare and Rhondda valleys directly to Alexandra Docks at Newport.

It was a little over 5 miles (8 km) in length, running from Pontypridd to a junction near Caerphilly; from there to Newport existing allied railways conveyed the mineral trains. A passenger service was operated later, not stopping intermediately on the line, until in 1904 a railmotor service was started, calling at new low-cost intermediate stopping places.

The line closed to passengers in 1962, and to freight from 1965.

== Monmouthshire Railway and Canal Company ==
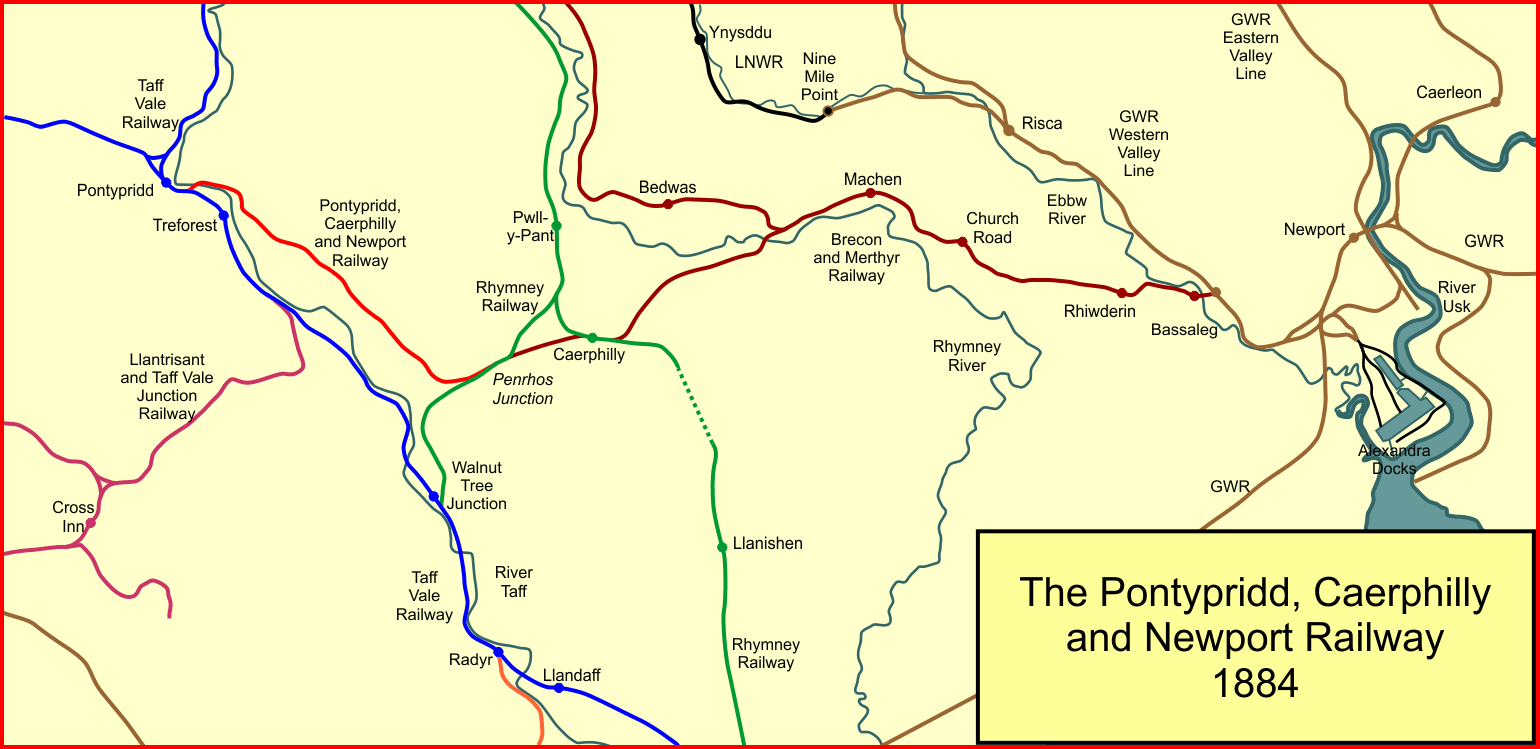
The Pontypool, Caerphilly and Newport Railway in context

The remarkable topography of south-east Wales consists of mountainous terrain with a number of valleys running north to south, or north-west to south-east. In addition, the region at the upper part of the valleys was rich in mineral resources, in particular iron ore, coal and limestone. The co-existence of these minerals encouraged the production of iron, but both that industry and the distribution of coal was limited by the very poor transport network, itself constrained by the valleys and intervening ridges.

In 1792 ironmasters and coalowners collaborated to form the Monmouthshire Canal Navigation, a canal that connected Pontnewynydd (near Pontypool) and Crumlin to Newport. The Monmouthshire Canal Navigation Act 1792 (32 Geo. 3. c. 102) permitted the construction of tramways to connect any mineral pit to the canal, provided the pit was within 7 miles (11 km) of the canal.

The canal proved very successful, and in time longer tramroad branches and main lines were built; from 1848 a modern railway was being built linking Newport and Pontypool. The Monmouthshire Canal Navigation Company changed its name to the Monmouthshire Railway and Canal Company.

== Newport Docks ==
Throughout this period, mineral products were transferred from canal boats, and later from tramroad wagons, to ships for export of coastal transport at wharves on the River Usk at Newport. Over time a considerable number of wharves were created. The tidal range there is exceptionally large, and it was increasingly difficult to effect the transfer as trade volume increased, and it was realised that a wet dock was needed. Newport Town Dock was opened in 1842. Trade was still increasing rapidly and the opening of the dock further stimulated the trade, so an extension was built, opening in 1858.

== Alexandra Dock ==
Still the volume of trade increased and outstripped the capacity of the enlarged Town Dock, and it was decided to build what became the Alexandra Dock; this was on a much larger scale on land to the south of the town. Interested parties formed a company, the Alexandra (Newport) Dock Company. Alexandra Dock opened in 1875.

The company changed its name in 1882 to the Alexandra (Newport and South Wales) Docks and Railway Company (A(N&SW)D&R), reflecting the fact of the complex of access railways at the docks.

Immediately it was realised that expansion of demand had continued to outstrip expansion of capacity, and a second dock, Alexandra South Dock, was opened in 1893, the original Alexandra Dock being renamed North Dock. Extensions to the South Dock were built in successive stages, until completion in 1914.

The Alexandra Dock system was said to be the largest dock in the world, and it was capable of handling the largest shipping then foreseeable.

== Coal from the Taff Valleys ==
Minerals and mineral products travelled almost exclusively by railway and canal in the nineteenth century, and the topographical constraints of building the railways resulted in their following valleys. (Note: There were two exceptions in south-east Wales: the Taff Vale Extension Railway of the Newport, Abergavenny and Hereford Railway and the Merthyr, Tredegar and Abergavenny Railway. Both were exceptionally expensive to build and difficult to work because of steep gradients.) This resulted in the Newport dock system being connected to the Newport Western and Eastern Valleys and the Sirhowy Valley. At the same time the coal districts of the Taff Valley and the Cynon Valley were connected to Cardiff, and transported onward from Cardiff Docks.

The volume of transported materials at Cardiff docks resulted in increasing congestion there, and it was reported that the masters of ships had to stand off for several days waiting for a berth to load their cargo. At the same time, the Cardiff system was considered to be a monopoly, exploited by its owners and charging excessive dues for its use. Moreover, the Taff Vale Railway serving the route from Pontypridd to Cardiff Docks had become extremely congested, and mineral trains spent lengthy periods waiting for access to the docks.

Meanwhile, the structure of the colliery trade was changing: steam coal from the Taff Valley was held in high esteem worldwide, and blending of coal was becoming commonplace. These factors resulted in a desire to connect Pontypridd with Newport. Caerphilly was already connected to Newport over the Rhymney Railway and the Brecon and Merthyr Railway, and the gap between the Taff Vale Railway at Pontypridd and a point of junction with the Rhymney Railway near Caerphilly was only a little over 5 miles (8 km) in extent.

== The Pontypridd, Caerphilly and Newport Railway ==
These considerations led to the formation of the Pontypridd, Caerphilly and Newport Railway (PC&NR). (Note: There was another railway nearby with the same initials: the Pontypool, Caerleon and Newport Railway.) The decision to go ahead was taken at the Alexandra Docks board meeting on 16 July 1877. Lord Tredegar was involved in the discussion, and for him the enhanced traffic which would pass the Park Mile on his lands would bring in substantial extra toll charges. Many of the directors and principal investors in the new company were involved in similar capacities with the Alexandra, and relations between the PC&NR and the A(N&SW)D&R were cordial.

The new company was incorporated by the Pontypridd, Caerphilly, and Newport Railway Act 1878 (41 & 42 Vict. c. ccxv) on 8 August 1878; James Szlumper was the engineer for the scheme.

== Opening delays ==
The line was duly constructed, but an intended opening at the beginning of 1884 was delayed:

owing to a defect in one of the abutments of the bridge crossing the River Taff at Pontypridd, men are pulling it down and propping the girders with timber, so that many months must now elapse before the reconstruction will be completed. The opening of the railway for traffic will therefore be retarded.

Even at the last minute there were problems which might have been foreseen:

For some little time past, hopes and expectations have been entertained that the new Pontypridd, Caerphilly and Newport Railway would be opened for goods and mineral traffic today (Tuesday), but up to Monday evening [30 June 1884], the owners of the line, although they had made strenuous efforts with that object, had failed to remove all the difficulties which stood in the way, and in all probability the opening will not take place for several days to come.

The Pontypridd, Caerphilly and Newport company have running powers over a small portion of the Rhymney Company’s line at Caerphilly station, and the chief obstacle in the way of the opening of the dormer company’s line, is that the manager of the latter company objects to these powers being exercised until his directors have had a meeting and granted formal permission.

Another difficulty presents itself in the fact that men to occupy the signalboxes on the new line have not yet been engaged.

Of course this delay in the opening of the new railway will have the effect of postponing the operation of the agreement entered into the other day between the Taff Vale Railway Company and the Pontypridd, Caerphilly and Newport Railway Company whereby the former company undertook to provide the locomotive power and work the latter’s line and as this agreement whenever it does come into force will deprive the Rhymney company of the traffic from the collieries in the Aberdare Valley it is perhaps not surprising that they are anxious that it should remain inoperative as long as possible.

Those difficulties were resolved, but there was worse to come:

Attempt to Open the Line: Obstructive Attitude of the Great Western Railway Company. On Monday morning [7 July 1884] officials of the Taff Vale Railway Company made an effort to open the Pontypridd, Caerphilly and Newport Railway for traffic the whole length from Pontypridd to Newport. A train of 27 wagons, loaded with coal, was started from one of the Powell Duffryn collieries, Aberdare Valley.

As well as the coal there were ten dignitaries travelling with the train.

In the wake of the train ran a pilot engine, to be ready in case of some mishap occurring, and the van at the tail of the coal train contained a number of short, stout bars of timber, to be used as sprags in case of emergency.

At Caerphilly an assistant engine was coupled in front for the 1 in 68 gradient. At Bassaleg the train would need to run over the GWR Western Valley line into Newport Docks.

At Bassaleg we came to an abrupt stand. We were now at the threshold of the Great Western Railway system, and Mr. Henshaw, the manager of the Merthyr and Brecon Line … tendered a "permit" to the official of the [GWR] … He returned it, and said that he could not allow the train to enter the line of his company. The train was moved to the limit of the boundary and left there, while most of the company proceeded to Newport to wait the result of a telegraphic dispatch to the head-office [of the GWR].

== Full opening ==
The train stood immobile at Bassaleg for over a fortnight, until on 25 July 1884, the GWR and the PC&NR negotiated the necessary running arrangement.

The PC&NR line itself was double track. There were no passenger stations.

The Pontypridd, Caerphilly and Newport Railway Act 1883 (46 & 47 Vict. c. clxxx) of 2 August 1883 authorised the Pontypridd, Caerphilly and Newport Railway to build an independent double track line from Bassaleg to the Alexandra Dock Company's line within Newport Docks, alongside the Monmouthshire Railway (now GWR) line. The confrontation in 1884 confirmed the need for this, and the 2 miles (3 km) of track was built, opening in April 1886. Until that section was opened, the Pontypridd to Newport coal trains passed over the track of six railway companies in a journey of 19 miles (31 km).

== Working of trains ==
As a short railway relying on neighbouring lines for continuation of the journey, the PC&NR did not acquire locomotives, and arranged with the Taff Vale Railway that it would work the trains.

A passenger service of three trains a day over the line was started on 28 December 1887; they ran from Pontypridd (TVR station) to Newport. There were no stops on the PC&NR line itself; by this time the Gaer Loop at Newport was open, and the trains could run direct to the Great Western Railway's High Street station. The train service was enhanced to four trains daily in 1892.

The passenger trains were operated by the Alexandra Docks company, until on 1 January 1899 the Great Western Railway took over the operation of the passenger trains.

The through service from Newport was suspended from 1917 because of the pressures of World War I, and restored on 9 July 1923, and extended to Merthyr at that time. It was suspended again on the outbreak of World War II in September 1939.

== Taking over coal train operation ==
The Taff Vale Railway had been working the mineral trains between Pontypridd and Newport since the outset, but gave notice that at they wished to cease doing so in 1903. The A(N&SW)D&R decided that they would take over the working themselves. At the time the Mersey Railway was changing over to electric operation, and a number of their condensing locomotives were available second-hand. Seven 2-6-2T and three 0-6-4T engines were acquired, up until 1905. The condensing apparatus was removed and the primitive weatherboards replaced by proper cabs. The engines were considered to be good performers on the PC&NR line.

== Railmotors ==
There had not been any intermediate stations on the PC&NR line, but in the first few years of the twentieth century, railway managers were considering how low-cost provision of passenger stops in lightly trafficked areas might be achieved. The solution seemed to be railmotors, generally single-carriage vehicles with a small integrated steam engine. The PC&NR decided to implement such a scheme, and acquired a railmotor, and a spare passenger coach was converted for use as a trailer.

Several stopping places were provided on the line; they were at Pontypridd Tram Road, Glyntaff Halt, Treforest Halt, Rhydyfelin (High Level) Halt, Dynea Halt, Upper Boat Halt, Groeswen Halt, Nantgarw (High Level). The designation "halt" was not applied to these stopping places. Nonetheless, most of them were of the most basic character.

The railmotor service did not enter the Taff Vale Railway station at Pontypridd, to avoid paying the TVR toll on doing so; the Tram Road station was not central in Pontypridd, and of course did not permit a direct change of train. The railmotor trains did not require to run round at the end of the journey, and there was only a platform on the westbound line at Tram Road; the railmotor returned to Caerphilly by running back along the westbound track to a crossover at Interchange Sidings, to gain the correct line. The single platform arrangement allowed pedestrian access to Broadway and also avoided the need for a subway.

At first the stopping place was a "ground platform", that is a small wooden plank staging at ground level. On 28 April 1906 an enhanced facility was inspected: an elevated platform 100 feet (30 m) long and 10 feet (3 m) broad was provided, with a waiting room and ladies’ room with conveniences. From 1 May 1906 a new crossover adjacent to the stopping place meant that the returning train could immediately cross to the correct line.

Railmotor no. 1 was built by the Glasgow Railway & Engineering Co Ltd, of Govan; it was 55 ft 6 in (16.92 m) long and could seat 52 passengers.

The new service was so successful that a second, larger, railmotor of improved design was acquired from 28 September 1905. No 2 was built by the same builders; it was 61 ft 3 in (18.67 m) long, and had a clerestory roof. Notwithstanding the success of the service, railmotors had the limitation of inflexibility at busy times. In 1911 (no. 2) and 1917 (no. 1) the railmotors were rebuilt as ordinary coaches, and both lasted in service until the 1930s.

== The Machen Road ==
East of Caerphilly the PC&NR mineral trains relied on the Brecon and Merthyr Railway route from Caerphilly to Bassaleg. It was a single line, and there was a difficult climb of 1 in 39 rising for loaded trains out of Caerphilly station, and these factors were a serious limitation on capacity.

It was decided to duplicate the worst part of the route on an easier gradient, and this was authorised by the Pontypridd, Caerphilly and Newport Railway Act 1887 (50 & 51 Vict. c. clxxvi) of 8 August 1887. This was done by building a new single line from Gwaun-y-bara to Machen, with a gradient of 1 in 200 for loaded trains. The old single line became the westbound track; although together they formed a double track, they were not immediately adjacent. The new arrangement came into operation on 14 September 1891; having been constructed by the PC&NR, it was immediately transferred to the Brecon and Merthyr Railway for operational purposes, receipts being shared equally.

== Absorbed by the Alexandra ==
There was an obvious reliance by the PC&NR on the Alexandra (Newport & South Wales) Dock and Railway, and the latter was a much larger undertaking. The A(N&SW)D&R absorbed the PC&NR by the Alexandra (Newport and South Wales) Docks and Railway Act 1897 (60 & 61 Vict. c. clxxxviii) of 6 August 1897, becoming effective on 31 December 1897.

== Grouping of the railways; and nationalisation ==
The Railways Act 1921 determined that most of the railway companies of Great Britain were to be restructured in four large "groups". The A(N&SW)D&R was a constituent of the new Great Western Railway, and the change took effect from 25 March 1922. (Note: The A(N&SW)D&R was primarily a dock activity, and was taken into the Docks Division of the GWR. Presumably the relatively distant section of railway was regarded as an intrinsic part of the local railway network.)

The GWR also took over other South Wales Railways, and because of the proximity of similarly named stations on the Cardiff Railway, Rhydyfelin and Nantgarw were redesignated "High Level" from 1 July 1924. (Note: This was not done in the case of Upper Boat, even though the Cardiff Railway had a nearby station of the same name.) All the stations on the line were redesignated "Halt" at the same time.

The railways were again restructured in 1948 when they were taken into state ownership. The former PC&NR line, having been part of the GWR railway operation, simply transferred to the new British Railways.

== Closure ==
The general decline in passenger use of rural services after 1945 affected the profitability of the passenger train service, and it was withdrawn on 17 September 1956. Freight use of the line continued, but that too was ended in 1965. The short stub at Pontypridd to Glyntaff Interchange Sidings remained in use until 31 July 1967.

The northern stretch of the line from Upper Boat to Pontypridd forms the redeveloped dual carriageway sections of the A470 road, while the southern 3 1/2-mile (5.6 km) section from Rhydyfelin to Penrhos form part of the Taff Trail cycleway.

== Location list ==
- Pontypridd PC&N Junction; (Note: Barrie and Baughan state that the junction signal box was emblazoned "Pontypridd, Caerphilly and Newport Junction" in full.) divergence from Taff Vale main line;
- Pontypridd Tram Road; opened 1 September 1904; closed 10 July 1922;
- Glyntaff; opened 1 September 1904; renamed Glyntaff Halt 1924; closed 5 May 1930;
- Treforest; opened 1 September 1904; renamed Treforest Halt 1924; closed 17 September 1956;
- Rhydyfelin; opened 1 September 1904; renamed Rhydyfelin (High Level) Halt 1924; relocated 18 chains east 14 May 1928; closed 2 February 1953;
- Dynea; opened 1 September 1904; renamed Dynea Halt 1924; closed 17 September 1956;
- Upper Boat; opened 1 September 1904; renamed Upper Boat Halt 1924; closed 17 September 1956;
- Groeswen; opened 1 September 1904; renamed Groeswen Halt 1924; closed 17 September 1956;
- Nantgarw; opened 1 September 1904; renamed Nantgarw (High Level) Halt 1924; closed 17 September 1956;
- Penrhos Junction; convergence with Rhymney Railway line.
