= Rumney Railway =

Defunct railway in Wales

The Rumney Railway in Wales was a 4 ft 2 in (1,270 mm) plateway built to connect the ironworks at Rhymney to the Monmouthshire Canal Company's tramroad near Newport, providing a connection the wharves at the Newport Docks. The line was opened in 1826. It was later converted to a standard gauge railway.

== History ==
Rumney Railway Act 1825
- Act of Parliament
- Parliament of the United Kingdom
- Long title: An Act for making and maintaining a Railway or Tram Road from the Northern Extremity of a certain Estate called Abertyswg, in the Parish of Bedwelty, in the County of Monmouth, to join the Sirhowy Railway, at or near Pye Corner, in the Parish of Bassaleg, in the same County.
- Citation: 6 Geo. 4. c. lxii

Dates
- Royal assent: 20 May 1825

Other legislation
- Repealed by: Rumney Railway Act 1861

Status: Repealed

Text of statute as originally enacted

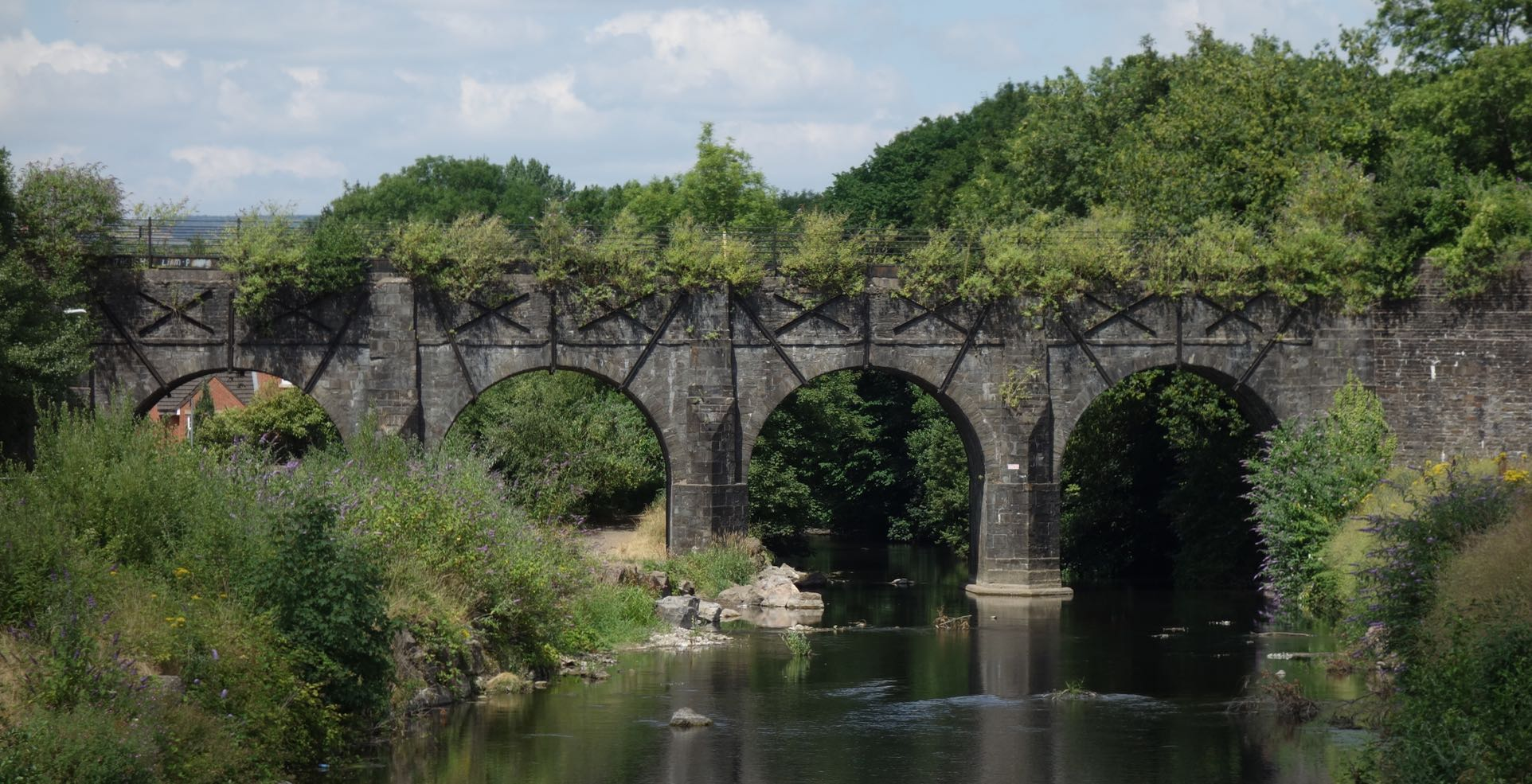
Bassaleg Viaduct, believed to be the world's oldest operational railway viaduct, built for the Rumney Railway in 1826 over the Ebbw River.

The company was incorporated by the Rumney Railway Act 1825 (6 Geo. 4. c. lxii) and the line, engineered by George Overton, opened the following year worked by horses. The line ran down the east side of the River Rhymney to Machen where the route left the river to head east towards Newport. It made a junction with the Monmouthshire line at the top end of that part of the company's route, known as the Park Mile, on its way to the shipping places on the River Usk at Newport. Sir Charles Morgan built and maintained the section where it ran through the park of his Tredegar House.

The line operated in a similar way to a toll road and traders introduced steam locomotives in the 1840s. In 1856 Crawshay Bailey purchased a plateway locomotive from the Monmouthshire company for the Rumney Railway, implying that the company was operating the line with its own locomotives.

Rumney Railway Act 1861
- Act of Parliament
- Parliament of the United Kingdom
- Long title: An Act for authorizing the Rumney Railway Company to alter the Line and Levels of their existing Railway, and to make and maintain new Railways in connexion therewith; and for other Purposes.
- Citation: 24 & 25 Vict. c. ccxxvii

Dates
- Royal assent: 1 August 1861

Other legislation
- Repeals/revokes: Rumney Railway Act 1825

Rumney and Brecon and Merthyr Railways Act 1863
- Act of Parliament
- Parliament of the United Kingdom
- Long title: An Act for making a Railway to complete the Connexion between the Brecon and Merthyr Tydfil Junction Railway and the Rumney Railway; for enabling the Brecon and Merthyr Tydfil Junction Railway Company to acquire the Rumney Railway; for facilitating the Transmission of Traffic over, from, and at the Rhymney Railway; and for other Purposes.
- Citation: 26 & 27 Vict. c. ccii

Dates
- Royal assent: 28 July 1863

Text of statute as originally enacted

The Monmouthshire company converted its lines in the Western Valleys to standard gauge in the 1850s. In 1861 Lord Tredegar (Chairman) and Crawshay Bailey (Director) obtained an act of Parliament, the Rumney Railway Act 1861 (24 & 25 Vict. c. ccxxvii) to reincorporate the Rumney Railway as a railway company, with powers to reconstruct the line as a standard gauge railway. Also obtained were powers to make a branch to join the Rhymney Railway at Caerphilly and to sell or lease the undertaking to either the Monmouthshire Railway or the West Midland Railway. However, little was done to improve the line and it remained a plateway until it was acquired by the Brecon and Merthyr Railway by the Rumney and Brecon and Merthyr Railways Act 1863 (26 & 27 Vict. c. ccii) of 28 July 1863.

The reconstructed line was finally passed as safe for passengers by the Board of Trade Inspector on his third visit, and opened to passenger traffic through to the Monmouthshire Railway's Newport (Dock Street) station on 14 June 1865.
