= Brecon and Merthyr Tydfil Junction Railway =

Railway company in Wales

The Brecon and Merthyr Tydfil Junction Railway (B&MTJR) was a railway company in Wales. It was originally intended to link the towns in its name. Finding its access to Merthyr difficult at first, it acquired the Rumney Railway, an old plateway, and this gave it access to Newport docks. This changed its emphasis from rural line to mineral artery.

It opened at the Brecon end to a point near Dowlais in 1863, and in 1865 it opened a disconnected section from Rhymney to Newport. In due course the company connected the two sections and reached Dowlais and Merthyr, but had to concede sharing a route with the powerful London and North Western Railway.

The B&MTJR was always short of money, and was notable for its prodigious gradients, but it survived until the grouping of 1923, when it became part of the Great Western Railway. Its network declined rapidly after 1945, and passenger operation ceased in 1962. Goods and mineral operation also lost its market, and as of 2020, only a short stub to a quarry at Machen remains rail connected.

== History ==
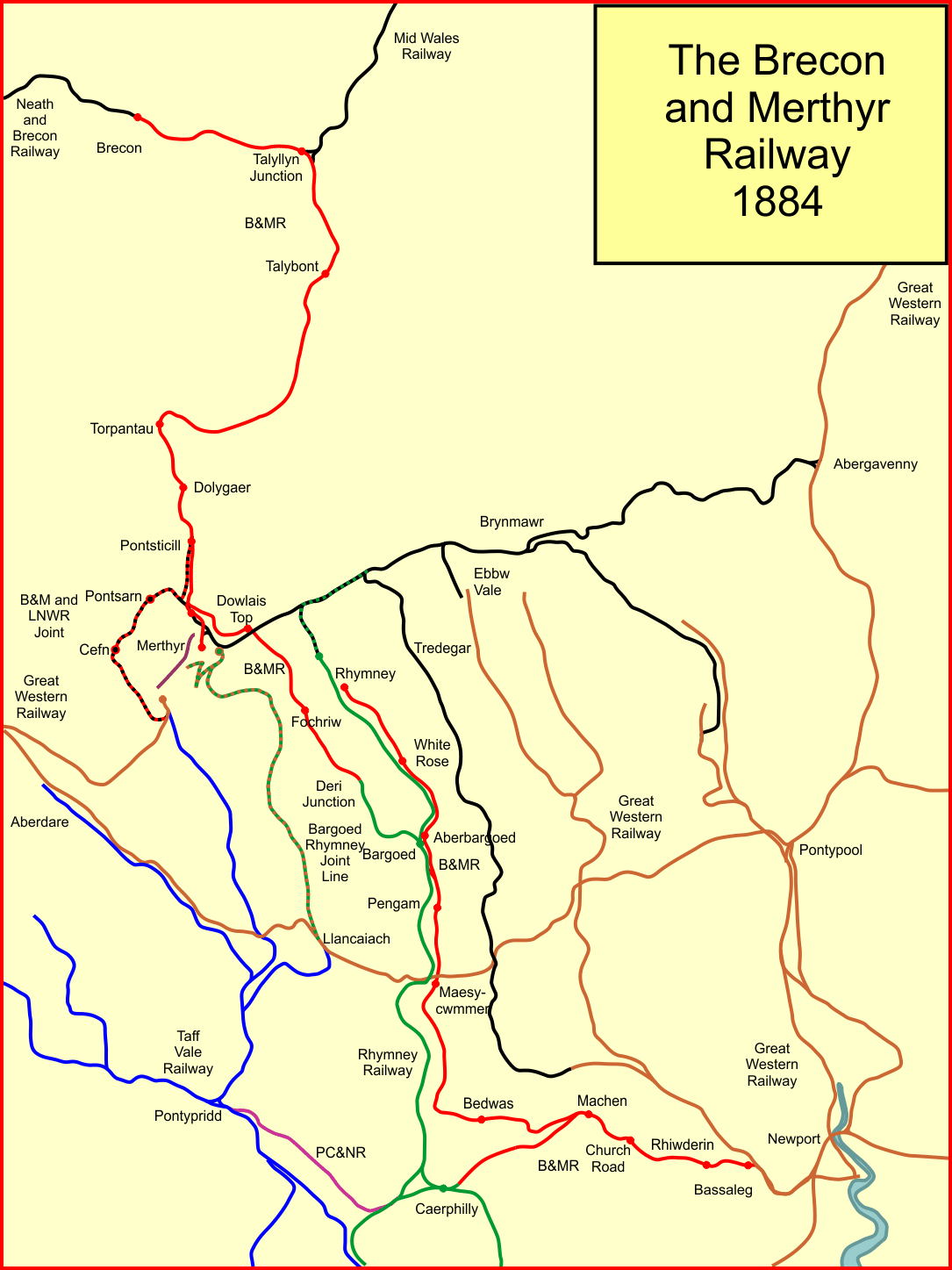
System map of the Brecon and Merthyr Railway in 1884

Brecon was an important regional centre in mediaeval times, due to its location at the confluence of the River Honddu and the River Usk. Its relatively remote location meant that transport was always an important consideration.

The difficult terrain southwards would require crossing the ridge of the Brecon Beacons into the high ground at the head of the South Wales Valleys, and the first turnpike connected eastward to Abergavenny and south-westward to Swansea.

The Brecknock and Abergavenny Canal, later part of the Monmouthshire and Brecon Canal, was opened to Brecon in 1800 continuing the alignment to the east.

In 1816 the Hay Railway was opened; this was a horse-drawn plateway 24 miles long, connecting Brecon to Hay, and later Eardisley.

Industry south of the Brecon Beacons was linked in to the canal when the Brinore Tramway (or Bryn Oer Tramway) opened in 1815. It connected the industrial site of Brinore, near Trevil, north of Tredegar, to Talybont-on-Usk, on the Brecknock and Abergavenny Canal.

== Brecon and Merthyr Junction Railway Act 1859 ==
In the 1859 session of Parliament, the Brecon and Merthyr Bill was considered. It proposed a railway from a junction with the Dowlais Railway of 1851 near its terminus at Dowlais, to Brecon near the head of the canal. The Dowlais Railway was built chiefly to serve the Dowlais Iron Company, so that the proposed B&MTJR would provide an outlet, via the canal, for its products. It also connected Dowlais and Merthyr in difficult terrain—it included a rope worked incline—that might save expense for the B&MTJR in reaching Merthyr.

Brecon and Merthyr Junction Railway Act 1859
- Act of Parliament
- Parliament of the United Kingdom
- Long title: An Act for making Railways in the District between Brecon and Merthyr Tydfil, and for other Purposes.
- Citation: 22 & 23 Vict. c. lxviii

Dates
- Royal assent: 1 August 1859

During the progress of the bill the Brecon to Talybont section was dropped, conceding the part of the route to another planned railway company; this failed to get authorised, but this was too late for the B&MTJR to reinstate the omitted section. The railway as authorised by the Brecon and Merthyr Junction Railway Act 1859 (22 & 23 Vict. c. lxviii) on 1 August 1859 was from Dowlais to Talybont.

A railway further north got authorised: the Hereford, Hay and Brecon Railway (HH&BR). It had made arrangements with the larger Newport, Abergavenny and Hereford Railway to work it.

The Hay Railway was intent as this stage on selling its line, and the Hereford, Hay and Brecon Railway proposed to purchase it, simplifying the issue of land acquisition. After considerable negotiation, the HH&BR agreed to partition the Hay Railway, conceding part to the Mid Wales Railway and the southern section from Talyllyn to Brecon was granted to the B&M. These arrangements were ratified by the Hay Railway Act 1860 (23 & 24 Vict. c. clxxix) of 6 August 1860.

Brecon and Merthyr Railway (Extensions) Act 1860
- Act of Parliament
- Parliament of the United Kingdom
- Long title: An Act to enable the Brecon and Merthyr Tydfil Junction Railway Company to complete their Communication with Brecon; and for other Purposes connected with their Undertaking.
- Citation: 23 & 24 Vict. c. xvii

Dates
- Royal assent: 15 May 1860

Text of statute as originally enacted

Accordingly, relying on the confirmation of the agreement, the B&MTJR was able to get powers to extend from Talybont through Talyllyn to Brecon, by Brecon and Merthyr Railway (Extensions) Act 1860 (23 & 24 Vict. c. xvii) of 15 May 1860. A triangular junction would be formed at Talyllyn with the Mid Wales Railway. Mutual running powers arrangements were agreed.

== Construction ==
The first sod was turned on 18 January 1860; the contractors were David Davies and Thomas Savin, and a lease arrangement was concluded with them for ten years in which they guaranteed the proprietors 5% interest on capital.

The Beacon Tunnel (official railway name 'Torpantau Tunnel') was completed by 11 January 1862, and on 28 August 1862 a trial run for the directors was undertaken between Pant and Talyllyn. The section between Talyllyn and Brecon was much slower to construct, partly because it was still in use by the Hay Railway; Talyllyn tunnel needed to be opened out with that traffic in operation.

It was possible to run a locomotive through to Brecon on 1 January 1863, and on 12 February Captain Rich of the Board of Trade carried out an inspection for approval of passenger operation. There was still a delay, but there was some revenue goods train operation in April 1863.

== Opening ==
The entire line between Brecon and Pant, 19 miles of single line, opened on 1 May 1863. First stations were Brecon (temporary station), Talyllyn (temporary station), Talybont, Dolygaer, and Pant. A horse omnibus connected for Merthyr; in due course the Dowlais Railway was to make the connection to the ironworks for mineral traffic. The engineer for the line was Henry Conybeare, who described it as a good locomotive road throughout. Coming south, locomotives were going to have to ascend the Seven Mile Bank, making a 925 feet climb.

== Extending the network ==
Brecon and Merthyr Railway Extensions Act 1861
- Act of Parliament
- Parliament of the United Kingdom
- Long title: An Act to enable the Brecon and Merthyr Tydfil Junction Railway Company to make certain new Lines of Railway; and for other Purposes.
- Citation: 24 & 25 Vict. c. ccxxxv

Dates
- Royal assent: 6 August 1861

Brecon and Merthyr Railway (Capital) Act 1861
- Act of Parliament
- Parliament of the United Kingdom
- Long title: An Act to enable the Brecon and Merthyr Tydfil Junction Railway Company to raise additional Money; and for other Purposes.
- Citation: 24 & 25 Vict. c. x

Dates
- Royal assent: 17 May 1861

While construction was in progress, the B&MTJR was busy getting Parliament to approve its plans for extension. In the 1861 session it obtained authority in the Brecon and Merthyr Railway Extensions Act 1861 (24 & 25 Vict. c. ccxxxv) to build down the Bargoed Rhymney valley, but the Rhymney Railway was given similar powers in the Rhymney Railway (Capital and Branch) Act 1861 (24 & 25 Vict. c. cxliv) and they were mutually exclusive. Eventually the powers were divided, the Rhymney Railway building up to Deri Junction, and the B&MTJR building down to that point from the north.

Brecon and Merthyr Railway Act 1862
- Act of Parliament
- Parliament of the United Kingdom
- Long title: An Act to enable the Brecon and Merthyr Tydfil Junction Railway Company to make new Railways, and for other Purposes.
- Citation: 25 & 26 Vict. c. clxxxiv

Dates
- Royal assent: 29 July 1862

Text of statute as originally enacted

The B&MTJR got powers in the Brecon and Merthyr Railway Act 1862 (25 & 26 Vict. c. clxxxiv) to abandon the Dowlais Railway connection that had become superfluous, and to connect directly to the Taff Vale Railway at Merthyr.

== The Rumney Railway ==
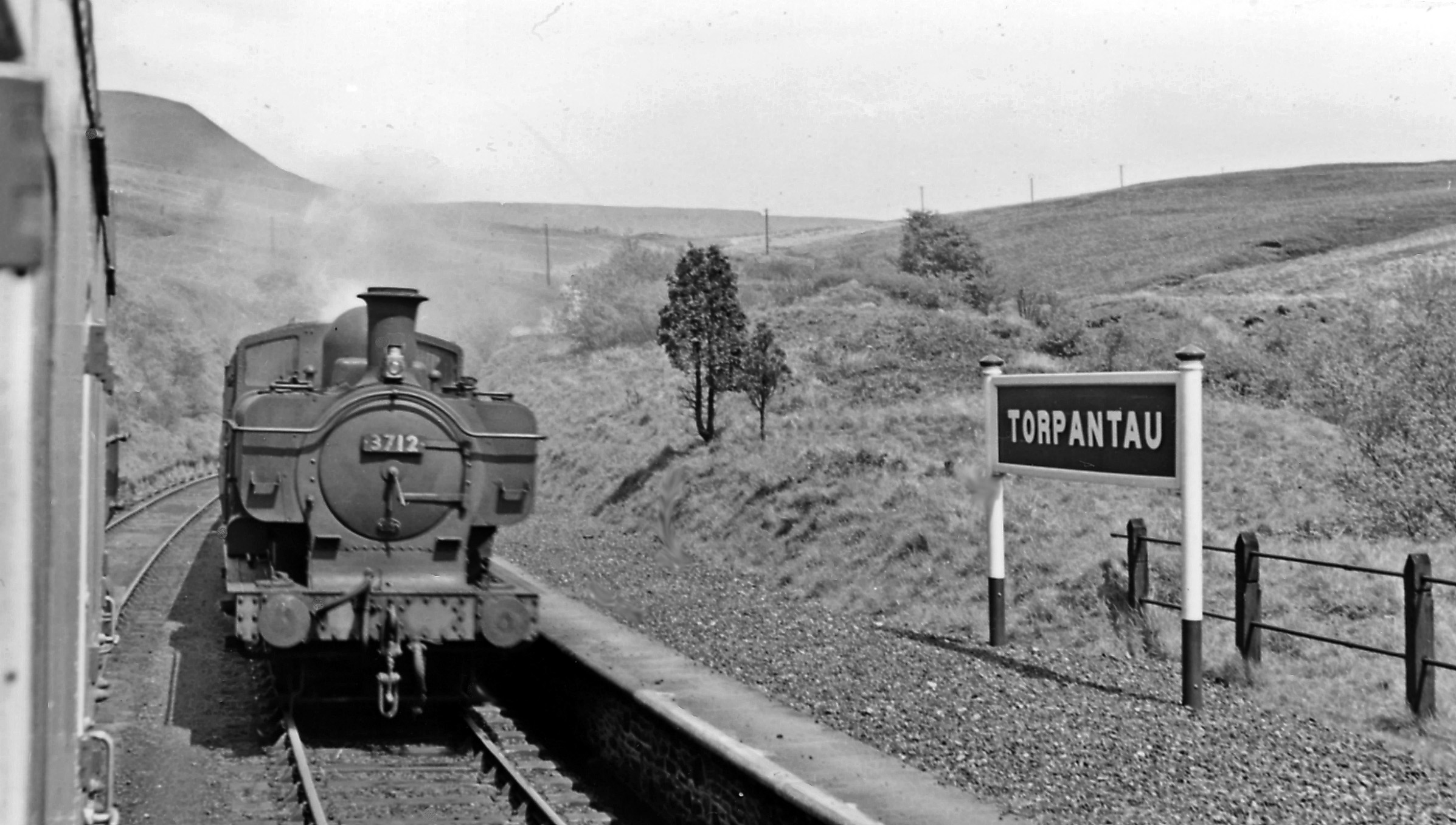
Torpantau station in 1957

The Rumney Railway had been incorporated in 1825 and opened in 1826 as a horse-operated plateway, running from the ironworks at Rhymney to Bassaleg, near Newport, connecting there with the Sirhowy Railway and giving access to Newport Docks. Some steam locomotive operation was undertaken after about 1854, and the Rumney Railway Act 1861 (24 & 25 Vict. c. ccxxvii) gave powers to modernise the line and adapt it for passenger operation. It is evident that the true objective was to sell the line to one or other more modern neighbouring company as a going concern. It was the Brecon and Merthyr Railway that acquired it for £90,000 under the Rumney and Brecon and Merthyr Railways Act 1863 (26 & 27 Vict. c. ccii) of 28 July 1863.

The B&MTJR had got hold of an obsolescent railway, but with it came access to Newport over the Monmouthshire Railway from Bassaleg. The B&MTJR now had to set about the modernisation of the line itself, including a considerable amount of easing of the sharp curves. Captain Rich, after two refusals, agreed to reopening for passenger operation following his inspection on 7 June 1865, and the line opened to passenger operation between Pengam and Newport Dock Street (Monmouthshire Railway) on 14 June 1865; the operation was extended up to Rhymney from 16 April 1866, and in 1867 coal traffic started running.

The Rhymney station was about a mile down the valley from the Rhymney Railway's equivalent.

Passenger stations on the B&MTJR section of this route were now Rhymney, New Tredegar, Bargoed, Pengam, Maesycwmmer, Bedwas, Machen, Church Road, Rhiwderin, and Bassaleg. This part of the B&MTJR was detached by ten miles from the section towards Brecon, running down the east side of the Rhymney River, opposite the Rhymney Railway itself on the west side.

== Financial danger ==
The company's trains were being worked by Thomas Savin and John Ward, who paid the proprietors 5% on their capital, but early in 1866 [or 1865] the contractor failed. Suddenly the B&MTJR was unable to meet its own financial commitments; it started to miss debenture payments, and the company went into administration. Thus it could not complete the Merthyr branch, and the restrictive clauses in its acts of Parliament meant that it oriented from opening the line through to Newport.

In 1868 and again in 1870 financial arrangements were made with creditors, which enabled the company to carry on; debentures were converted to debenture stock and the company was enabled to continue.

== Completing to Merthyr, Dowlais and Newport ==
Finishing the line to Merthyr was the obvious priority, and Alexander Sutherland was commissioned to find a means to do so. The obstruction hitherto had been the objection of the Crawshay Estate to the line coming through the grounds of Cyfarthfa Castle. Sutherland redesigned the route further west, avoiding the Estate. This was at the expense of much difficulty of engineering, and of operation later.

The line was opened in part, from Pontsticill to Cefn, on 1 August 1867. The new line joined the Vale of Neath Railway line at Rhydycar Junction, immediately south of Merthyr station, opening on 1 August 1868. The VoNR station at Merthyr was used.

This now released the legal obstruction to the opening to Newport; the part of this from Pant to Dowlais Top had opened on 1 August 1867, and from Dowlais Top to Pengam was opened on 1 September 1868. Three trains ran daily from Brecon to Newport Dock Street.

This section from Dowlais to Pengam ran through the Bargoed Rhymney Valley. Both the B&MTJR and the Rhymney Railway had wished to build a line through this, but the defile near Bargoed made that physically impossible, and at length a compromise was reached: the Rhymney Railway would build up from Bargoed to Deri Junction, and the B&MTJR would build down from Dowlais to Deri Junction. There would be a limited mutual exchange of running powers.

At Bargoed the Rhymney Railway and the B&MTJR trains exercising running powers were on the west side of the valley, and the B&MTJR from its Rhymney station was on the east side. A north-west to south-east diagonal connection was built as part of the work.

The location of the stations at Dowlais was determined by the through lines on which they were sited, and in 1865 the B&MTJR had obtained powers to make a short branch to a central location in Dowlais. It opened from Pant on 23 June 1869. The Dowlais station, at Lloyd Street, was later (in 1924) renamed Dowlais Central.

== LNWR connections ==
The London and North Western Railway (LNWR) was encroaching from the east by means of the Merthyr, Tredegar and Abergavenny Railway which it had acquired, and it was obvious that it sought to reach Dowlais and Merthyr. In the London and North Western Railway (New Lines) Act 1867 (30 & 31 Vict. c. cxiii) of 15 July 1867 it obtained authority to make junctions with the B&MTJR near Dowlais Top and near Dowlais (Central), where its new alignment would bring the two railways close together. The LNWR line was to pass Dowlais heading north, in tunnel under Pant station, curving west and south to join the B&MTJR line at Morlais Junction. The connections were made on 1 January 1873.

The connection at Dowlais Top was used for the exchange of goods and mineral traffic, and was removed about 1933. The connection near the B&MTJR central station at Dowlais was made by curving from northward to join the B&MTJR southward at Ivor Junction just outside the B&MTJR station; LNWR trains used the B&MTJR station from that time. On 4 May 1885 the LNWR opened a station at Dowlais High Street, somewhat to the east of Dowlais, and from that date transferred its passenger calls to that station.

The goods traffic of the LNWR (and its successors) continued to be exchanged at Dowlais (Central) B&MTJR station until 22 November 1954, from which date such traffic ran via Pontsticill Junction.

The LNWR still wanted good access to Merthyr and in 1874 promoted a bill for a new line getting access to the town. The B&MTJR opposed this in Parliament, but a compromise was reached by which the B&MTJR's own Merthyr line would be made joint with the LNWR in consideration of the LNWR refunding half the original cost of construction of that line. This was agreed, but the LNWR had to build an expensive connecting line from a new junction, Penywern Junction, on its line to the B&MTJR Dowlais (Central) station, running northward in tunnel to a westward junction with the B&MTJR line at Morlais Junction.

The line took four years to construct, but the LNWR took formal joint ownership of the relevant part of the B&MTJR line in 1875, ensuring that it retained access in the event of the B&MTJR negotiating with rivals. The LNWR line opened on 1 June 1879, when the LNWR trains were able to run to Merthyr High Street station.

== Hereford, Hay and Brecon Railway ==
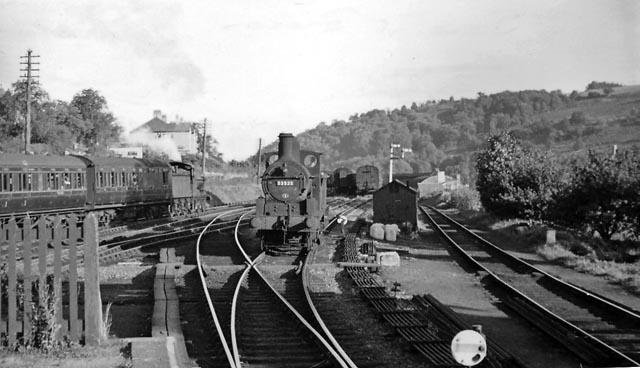
East end of Brecon station in 1949

The Brecon and Merthyr Railway had opened its first main line between Brecon and Pant on 1 May 1863. Trains of the Hereford, Hay and Brecon Railway, worked by the Mid Wales Railway, started working in to Brecon from 19 September 1864

An east loop was built at Talyllyn, forming a triangular junction there, enabling goods trains from Merthyr to the north to run direct; this opened on 21 September 1864.

Brecon and Merthyr Railway (Amalgamation) Act 1865
- Act of Parliament
- Parliament of the United Kingdom
- Long title: An Act for enabling the Brecon and Merthyr Tydfil Junction Railway Company to acquire the Hereford, Hay, and Brecon Railway; and for other Purposes.
- Citation: 28 & 29 Vict. c. cccxxiv

Dates
- Royal assent: 5 July 1865

Text of statute as originally enacted

The original partitioning of the Hay Railway had been a negotiated compromise, and led to an arrangement that was less than ideal; the Hereford, Hay and Brecon Railway agreed to amalgamate with the Brecon and Merthyr Railway, and this was ratified by the Brecon and Merthyr Railway (Amalgamation) Act 1865 (28 & 29 Vict. c. cccxxiv) of 5 July 1865.

Brecon and Merthyr Railway Arrangement Act 1868
- Act of Parliament
- Parliament of the United Kingdom
- Long title: An Act for suspending legal Proceedings with reference to the Brecon and Merthyr Tydfil Junction Railway Company; for converting the Mortgage and other Debts into Debenture Stock; for authorizing the Completion of certain Lines of Railway; for regulating the Capital and future Management of the Company; and for other Purposes.
- Citation: 31 & 32 Vict. c. cxlii

Dates
- Royal assent: 13 July 1868

This appeared to be satisfactory, but it emerged in 1867 that the arrangement had not been agreed by the preference shareholders, and the amalgamation was held to be void. The Brecon and Merthyr Railway Arrangement Act 1868 (31 & 32 Vict. c. cxlii) confirmed the separation of the two companies once again and the HH&BR was reincorporated by the Hereford, Hay and Brecon Railway Act 1869 (32 & 33 Vict. c. cxl) of 26 July 1869. It needed a company to work its trains for it, and after a false start the Midland Railway performed this task, from 1 October 1869. The Midland Railway had a presence at Hereford using running powers, and had long sought an entry into South Wales.

The working arrangement was converted into a lease (of the HH&BR by the Midland) from 1874 and acquired the Swansea Vale Railway in the same year. When it negotiated an arrangement to run its trains over the Neath and Brecon Railway from 1877, it had achieved its goal of reaching Swansea. This brought a considerable volume of additional traffic to the route, and proved lucrative for the Brecon and Merthyr, whose line formed part of the chain from Hereford to Swansea.

== Brecon arrangements ==
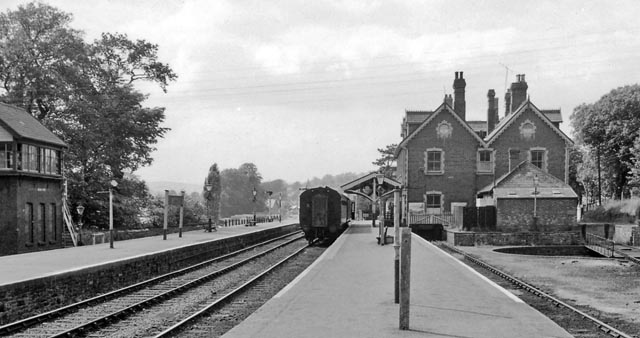
Brecon Free Street station, looking west towards Neath in 1962

The first Brecon and Merthyr Railway station at Brecon was at Watton; it was always intended as a temporary station, but the arrival of the HH&BR trains and Mid Wales Railway's own trains overloaded the accommodation significantly.

The Neath and Brecon Railway opened its line at Brecon from the west in 1867, but during its construction it became clear that its attitude to the B&MTJR was unfriendly. It was also desperately short of money, and opened its line to a separate temporary station at Free Street. A connection was made between the two stations, but it was not suitable for passenger operation. Nevertheless, Barrie observes:

As late as July 1869… the Neath and Brecon Engineer, admitted to a House of Lords select committee that if any passengers for east of Brecon arrived by train at Mount Street their tickets were collected, they were put on the engine, and run forward on the high level line to a point opposite and above the Watton station. (There was also a loop line direct from the Free Street extension into Watton Yard, but the Neath & Brecon witnesses claimed that the B&M would not let them use it, but kept the points locked.

By 1870 a contract was let to build a new station at Free Street, intended to be a Joint station for all the railway companies (although wholly owned by the B&MTJR), and it opened on 1 March 1871. Nonetheless, the Neath and Brecon Railway continued to use its own station until 1874, when its passenger trains moved to Free Street, the former station being relegated to goods traffic. Watton had already adopted that role.

== Caerphilly ==
The Old Rumney Railway had secured authorisation in the Rumney Railway Act 1861 (24 & 25 Vict. c. ccxxvii) for a line from Machen to Caerphilly, and after the acquisition of the Old Rumney by the B&MTJR this was constructed, opening in 1867. It served mainly collieries and factories.

On 8 August 1878 the Pontypridd, Caerphilly and Newport Railway (PC&NR) was incorporated. It was heavily sponsored by the Alexandra (Newport) Dock Company, which wished to bring the coal resources of the Rhondda and Cynon (Aberdare) valleys to Newport Docks. Traffic agreements were secured with the Taff Vale Railway to achieve the connection, as well as with the B&MTJR and the Rhymney Railway.

In 1882 the B&MTJR decided to double the line between Bassaleg, Machen and Abertysswg in anticipation of considerable extra business on the route.

The Great Western Railway (GWR), by now owner of the Monmouthshire Railway system, was less cooperative. The PC&NR (Note: There was another, unconnected PC&NR in the vicinity: the Pontypool, Caerleon and Newport Railway.) was to use the B&MTJR from Machen to Bassaleg, but needed to pass over a mile or so of the Monmouthshire Western Valley line to reach Newport Docks, and the GWR did not make the facility available at first, on 7 July 1884. After a stand-off the use of the line was conceded.

In 1882 the Newport Docks company reconstituted itself as the Alexandra (Newport and South Wales) Docks and Railway and was clearly in the lead over the affairs of the PC&NR, and it obtained powers in 1883 to build an additional double track alongside the Western Valley line from Bassaleg. This opened in April 1886.

The approach to Machen on the B&MTJR Caerphilly branch was on a steeply graded single line, and working the heavy mineral traffic over it was inconvenient; the PC&NR obtained powers to build a second, nearly parallel single line on easier gradients: the Machen Loop. This was opened on 14 September 1891 an immediately transferred to B&MTJR ownership. The new and old single lines were operated as a double track. Waterloo and Fountain Bridge platforms for the railmotor stopping trains, were on the separated single lines and accordingly had a service in one direction only respectively.

== Barry Railway ==
The Barry Railway was founded to provide an alternative port for the export of the coal and mineral resources of South Wales, following decades of dissatisfaction with the facilities at Cardiff and Newport, and with the railway connections to those places.

The first section of line opened in 1888 and in the following year coal was hauled from the Rhondda Valley, and the Company moved on to providing a connection from the Rhymney Railway at Penrhos, west of Caerphilly.

In 1898 it obtained powers to make another connection, this time with the B&MTJR between Bedwas and Maesycwmmer. This was a significant civil engineering undertaking, crossing the Rhymney Valley on a large structure known as Llanbradach viaduct.

The new line opened on 2 January 1905. The Barry Railway had running powers for mineral traffic in the upper part of the B&MTJR network in the Rhymney Valley; other traffic was hauled by the local company and exchanged at Duffryn Isaf.

== Grouping ==
Most of the railways of Great Britain became part of one or other of four new larger companies, in an event referred to as the "grouping", following the Railways Act 1921. The Brecon and Merthyr Railway was a subsidiary (Note: Only the larger lines qualified to be "constituents". The Rhymney Railway was not much greater in capitalisation, but its net income was nearly seven times that of the B&MTJR; the constituent companies were the GWR itself; the Alexandra (Newport and South Wales Docks and Railway, the Barry Railway, the Cambrian Railways, the Cardiff Railway, the Rhymney Railway and the Taff Vale Railway.) of the new Great Western Railway; the change took effect on 1 July 1922.

There had, of necessity, been capital reconstructions in 1882 and 1902. In the 20th century dividends were paid on the preference shares, and in 1918–1921 this was as high as 4%, but on preference shares only.

At 31 December 1921, the B&MTJR had issued capital of £2.07 million; net income in 1921 was £66,577; dividend in 1921 on ordinary shares: nil; locomotives taken over by the GWR: 47; number of passenger carriages 90; number of freight wagons 640; employees 842. Single track mileage was 82 miles and 44 chains (133 km) en route mileage of 59 miles and 66 chains (96 km).

== From 1923 ==
Many of the ironworks of the Merthyr and Dowlais areas were declining steeply or indeed closing in this period, and the B&MTJR network's dependency on those industries made it extremely vulnerable. A traffic pooling arrangement for mineral traffic between the GWR and the London Midland and Scottish Railway was agreed in 1933. This resulted in a switch for much traffic to more efficient routes, avoiding the long and difficult climb through the Brecon Beacons and Talyllyn, and this reduced the volume of traffic.

The hillside above New Tredegar had shown itself to be unstable, resulting in temporary closure of the line in 1916, and there were more serious slips in September 1928, April 1929 and April 1930. This resulted in the closure of the upper portion of the branch from 14 April 1930; the only working colliery on the affected section could equally well be served by the former Rhymney Railway branch.

== From 1948 ==
Under British Railways ownership after nationalisation, the decline in use of the railway continued, affecting all classes of traffic.

The passenger service between Dowlais Central (the former B&MTJR terminus at Dowlais) and Pant was withdrawn from 28 June 1952. For a period workmen's trains continued, but these were ended on 2 May 1960.

The Machen to Pontypridd passenger service, instituted but not worked by the PC&NR, was closed down on 15 September 1956.

The Merthyr to Pontsticill service was withdrawn from 13 November 1961. The main line service from Newport to Brecon, and also the New Tredegar branch, closed from 31 December 1962. On the same date, the services from Hereford and Moat Lane were also closed down, so that Brecon had no passenger train service.

There remained a Caerphilly – Machen – Newport unadvertised service for workmen as the only passenger operation on the B&MTJR network; that too closed on 1 July 1963.

Goods and mineral traffic between Deri Junction and Pant was withdrawn on 5 August 1963, followed by that between Brecon and Merthyr, and also Pontsticill and Dowlais Central, on 4 May 1964. Brecon continued as a non-rail-connected coal depot until 9 November 1964.

Bedwas to Pengam closed completely on 31 December 1962. The Waterloo section of line, built to ease gradients and congestion approaching Machen, was closed on 20 July 1964, but the residual freight traffic was diverted through Radyr and the Caerphilly to Machen section closed from 20 November 1967.

Ogilvie Colliery on the Deri line remained in use until 3 September 1978.

By 1980 only one short section of 10.5 miles (16.9 km) survived, serving coal traffic to Bedwas Navigation Colliery, from Newport via Bassaleg and Nine Mile Point. When the Bedwas colliery closed, the section of the branch between Bedwas and Machen was also closed, in 1985. The section between Machen and Bassaleg Junction has experienced sporadic stone traffic from Hanson Aggregates' limestone quarry, east of Machen.

== 1878 accident ==
The B&MTJR was subject to a number of accidents; the extreme gradients were often a cause. On 2 December 1878 a particularly tragic accident took place. A goods and mineral train was descending the seven-mile bank, and inadequate wagon brakes had been applied. The train got out of control, and derailed near Talybont, running down the embankment slope. The train consisted of 22 wagons of coal, three of goods, 11 empties, and a brake van; it was worked by three 0-6-0 saddle tank engines; the aggregate weight of the train was 397 tons. Two drivers and two firemen were killed.

== Rolling stock ==
Initially, the B&MTJR was worked by the contractor Thomas Savin, who provided locomotives and rolling stock from a fleet that was also used to work several other Welsh lines, such as the Mid Wales Railway. Savin went bankrupt in February 1866 and fourteen of his 56 locomotives then came into B&MTJR ownership.

Later locomotive classes of the Brecon and Merthyr Tydfil Junction Railway
Wheels	Quantity	Final B&MTJR nos.	Builder	Year	To GWR	First GWR nos.	To BR	Extinct	Notes	Ref
2-4-0	2	10, 21	Sharp, Stewart & Co.	1865	–	–	–	1904	Ordered by Savin. No. 21 originally 9	
0-6-0ST	12	18–29	Sharp, Stewart & Co.	1865–72	–	–	–	1905	Ordered by Savin	
0-6-0ST	2	30–31	Avonside Engine Co.	1874	–	–	–	1921	Ex-Neath and Brecon Railway, acquired 1877	
0-6-0ST	2	17–18	Sharp, Stewart & Co.	1881	2	2190–1	–	1934	No. 18 originally 11	
0-6-0ST	12	1–8, 13–16	Robert Stephenson & Co.; John Fowler & Co.	1884–86	12	2177–88	–	1934		
2-4-0T	6	9–12, 21, 25	Robert Stephenson & Co.	1888–89, 1898, 1904	5	1402/12/52/8/60	–	1924		
0-6-2ST	4	19, 20/3/6	Vulcan Foundry	1894, 1905	4	1674/7/92, 1833	–	1928		
0-6-0ST	5	22, 24, 27–29	Kitson & Co; Nasmyth, Wilson & Co.	1896, 1900	5	2169–73	–	1932		
0-6-0ST	3	32–34	Swindon Works	1886–87	3	1685/93/4	–	1934	Ex-GWR 1661 Class, acquired 1906–07	
4-4-0PT	1	35	Swindon Works	1898	–	–	–	1916	Ex-GWR No. 1490, acquired 1908	
0-6-2T	8	36–43	Robert Stephenson & Co.	1909–10, 1914	8	11, 21, 332, 504, 698, 888, 1084, 1113	7	1951	Allotted 421–8 in 1946; except for 11, 332, 504, 1084 these were renumbered in 1947.	
4-4-2T	1	44	Beyer Peacock & Co	1879	1	1391	–	1922	Ex-LSWR 46 class, acquired 1914	
0-6-2T	6	45–50	Robert Stephenson & Co.	1915, 1921	6	1372–5, 1668/70	6	1954	Renumbered 431–6 during 1947–50	
0-6-0T	1	35	Kerr, Stuart & Co.	1917	1	2161	–	1929	Ex-Railway Operating Division, acquired 1920	

Whilst the B&MTJR was absorbed by the GWR on 1 July 1922, its locomotives were not taken into stock until the four-week period that ended on 8 October that year. At the time, there were 47 locomotives allocated to five depots: Bassaleg (29 locomotives), Brecon (13), Dowlais (2), Rhymney (2) and Talyllyn (1). All were tank locomotives: most were of the 0-6-0T (23 locomotives) and 0-6-2T (18) wheel arrangements, there were also 2-4-0T (5) and 4-4-2T (1). Many of the locomotives were withdrawn by the end of 1934, leaving 14 0-6-2T; of these, one was withdrawn in 1947 and the remainder were inherited by British Railways in 1948, the last two being withdrawn in 1954.

Bassaleg locomotive depot opened in 1875. The GWR gave it the code BSG, and it closed in 1926 – the locomotives were transferred to Newport (Ebbw Junction) depot.

Brecon locomotive depot was shared with the Cambrian Railways, it opened in 1863 on the southern side of Watton station. The GWR gave it the code BCN and number 39. At the end of 1947, it had 14 locomotives: nine 0-6-0, four 0-6-0PT and one 0-4-2T. British Railways initially gave it the code 89B but in November 1959 it became a sub-shed of Oswestry, so the locomotives allocated to Brecon carried the 89A code of Oswestry. Regional boundary changes at the end of 1960 moved Oswestry into the London Midland Region, but Brecon remained in the Western Region, and again gained its own code, this time 88K. It closed in December 1962.

Dowlais locomotive depot was on the western side of Dowlais Central station; it opened in 1898. The GWR gave it the code CVU and number 78, altering the code to DLS in 1940. At the end of 1947, it had a single locomotive – ex-TVR O4 class 0-6-2T no. 292. British Railways made it a sub-shed of Merthyr, so the locomotives allocated to Dowlais carried the 88D code of Merthyr. It closed in May 1960.

Rhymney closed by 1930. Talyllyn was a sub-shed of Brecon, and closed in 1922.

There were 114 coaching stock vehicles (76 four-wheel and 38 six-wheel) taken into GWR stock on 24 July 1922, of which 91 (60 third-class, 18 composite, 11 brake third and two saloons) were passenger carrying, and the remainder (17 brake vans, three horse boxes, two carriage trucks and an inspection car) non-passenger. There were also three "market vans", authorised to run in passenger trains. Virtually all of these were withdrawn within a few years of grouping – only two were still in stock at the end of 1928: a third-class coach, withdrawn in 1930; and a brake van (used as a breakdown van), withdrawn in 1948.

- Goods vehicles (mainly coal): 629. By 1913, the line carried nearly 3.5 million long tons a year of coal and 227,000 long tons of other minerals.

The main workshops for locomotives, carriages and wagons were at Machen; it was open by 1863, and was reconstructed in 1875. The works was about half a mile east of Machen station on the northern side of the line (51.5956°N 3.1303°W). Although overhaul of the whole rolling stock fleet was carried out there, new construction was confined to wagons, including the three "market vans". One locomotive, no. 25, part-built by Robert Stephenson & Co., was completed at Machen during 1898. After the Grouping, the GWR rationalised the workshops inherited from the various railways of South Wales, and the Caerphilly works of the former Rhymney Railway was selected for enlargement. The work was completed in 1926, and Machen works, just a few miles to the north-east, was then closed.

== Traffic managers and general managers ==
- Alfred Henshaw, 1863 – 1894
- John Gall, 1894 – 1903
- Herbert R. Price, 1903 – 1922.

== Locomotive Superintendents ==
- John Thomas Simpson: 1863 – 10 June 1869 (killed in accident at Maesycwmmer)
- Thomas Mason: 1869 – November 1871 (resigned)
- Charles Long: January 1872 – May 1888 (retired)
- George C. Owen: 1888 – 18 April 1909 (killed in accident at Machen)
- James Dunbar: 1909 – February 1922 (died in office)

Following the death of Dunbar, the post remained vacant until the GWR absorbed the B&MTJR locomotive stock on 1 July 1922. During this period, H. F. H. Gibson, the chief draughtsman, was in charge of the B&MTJR locomotive department.

== Topography ==
The Pontsarn viaduct is 455 feet (139 m) long and 92 feet (28 m) high, whilst the Cefn Coed (or Pontycapel) viaduct is 770 feet (230 m) long with a height of 115 feet (35 m).

Torpantau tunnel through the Beacons was 667 yards (610 m) long. At an elevation of 1,313 feet (400 m), it was the highest railway tunnel above sea level anywhere in Britain. Exiting from south-east portal of the tunnel, the line descended for 7 miles (11 km) along a 1:38 (2.6%) gradient by the side of Glyn Collwyn and the (later: 1931) Talybont reservoir.

Talyllyn tunnel was situated at the west end of the former Talyllyn station, about 5 miles (8 km) to the east of Brecon. It is 674 yards (616 m) long, and was originally built in 1816 for the Hay Railway.

=== Location list, Brecon to Dowlais ===
- Brecon Mount Street (N&B station); opened 3 June 1867; closed 1872;
- Brecon Free Street; opened 1 March 1871; closed 31 December 1962;
- Watton (on spur); opened 23 April 1863; closed 1 March 1871;
- Heol Lladron Junction; convergence of Watton spur;
- Groesfford Halt; opened 8 September 1934; closed 31 December 1962;
- Talyllyn Tunnel; 674 yards;
- Talyllyn Brynderwen; opened 23 April 1863; closed 1 October 1869;
- Talyllyn Junction; opened 1 October 1869; closed 31 December 1962;
- Talyllyn East Junction;
- Talybont; opened 19 March 1863; renamed Talybont-on-Usk 1898; closed 31 December 1962;
- Pentir Rhiw; opened April 1897 for limited use; closed 31 December 1962;
- Torpantau Tunnel; 667 yards;
- Torpantau; opened 18 June 1863; closed 31 December 1962;
- Dolygaer Halt; opened 19 March 1863; closed 31 December 1962;
- Pontsticill Junction; opened 19 March 1863; closed 31 December 1962;
- Dowlais; opened 19 March 1863; renamed Pant(Glam) 1869; closed 31 December 1962;
- Pantysgallog Halt; opened 1 October 1910; renamed Pantysgallog Halt High Level 1950; closed 2 May 1960;
- Dowlais; opened 23 June 1869; renamed Dowlais Central 1924; closed 2 May 1960.

=== Merthyr loop line ===
- Pontsticill Junction; above;
- Pontsarn; opened June 1869; closed 13 November 1961;
- Cefn; opened 1 August 1867; renamed Cefn Coed 1920; closed 13 November 1961;
- Morlais Junction; convergence of LNWR line;
- Heolgerrig Halt; opened 31 May 1937; closed 13 November 1961;
- Cyfarthfa Junction with ironworks lines;
- Ynysfach Junction;
- Rhydycar Junction.

== Bargoed Rhymney line ==
- Pant; above;
- Dowlais Top; opened 1 August 1867; closed 31 December 1962;
- Pantywaun Halt; opened 22 December 1941; closed 31 December 1962;
- Fochriw; opened September 1867; closed 31 December 1962;
- Ogilvie Colliery Halt; miners' platform; opened 8 June 1925; closed 31 December 1962;
- Ogilvie Village Halt; opened 16 May 1935; closed 31 December 1962;
- Deri Junction; junction with Rhymney Railway.

=== Rhymney to Newport ===
- Rhymney
- Rhymney Lower and Pontlottyn: opened 16 April 1866: closed 14 April 1930;
- Abertysswg; opened 1 August 1905; closed 14 April 1930;
- Mclaren Colliery Halt; in use in 1930; opening date uncertain; closed 14 April 1930;
- New Tredegar colliery platform; in use in late 1920s, opening date uncertain; closed 14 April 1930;
- White Rose; opened 16 April 1866; renamed New Tredegar & White Rose 1885; renamed New Tredegar & Tirphil 1906; renamed New Tredegar 1924; closed 31 December 1962;
- Elliot Pit Halt; miners' platform; opened by September 1926; closed 31 December 1962;
- Cwmsyfiog Halt; opened 5 July 1937; closed 31 December 1962;
- Cwmsyfiog & Brithdir; opened 1 February 1908; renamed Cwmsyfiog 1924; closed 5 July 1937; reopened as Cwmsyfiog Colliery Halt for miners only 6 December 1937; closed 31 December 1962;
- Aberbargoed; opened 16 April 1866; renamed Aberbargoed & Bargoed 1 September 1905; relocated 10 chains north 1 July 1924; relocated to original site and renamed Aberbargoed 30 September 1935; closed 31 December 1962;
- Bargoed Colliery Halt; opened 1926; closed 31 December 1962;
- Pengam; opened 14 June 1865; closed 31 December 1962;
- Fleur de lis platform; opened 29 March 1926; closed 31 December 1962;
- Maesycwmmer Junction; divergence to Taff Vale Extension line;
- Maesycwmmer; opened 14 June 1865; closed 31 December 1962;
- Llanbradach Colliery Halt; opened by September 1928; closed between 1948 and 1954, date uncertain;
- Barry Junction; divergence of Barry Railway;
- Bedwas; opened 14 June 1865; closed 31 December 1962;
- Trethomas; opened 4 January 1915; closed 31 December 1962;
- Machen; convergence of Caerphilly lines; opened 14 June 1865; closed 31 December 1962;
- Church Road; opened 14 June 1865; closed 16 September 1957;
- Rhiwderin; opened 14 June 1865; closed 1 March 1954;
- Bassaleg; opened 14 June 1865; closed 31 December 1962;
- Bassaleg Junction; convergence with Western Valley line.

=== Caerphilly to Machen ===
- Caerphilly; Rhymney Railway station;
- Gwernydomen Halt; opened from October 1908; closed 17 September 1956;
- [down and up lines separate];
- Fountain Bridge Halt; down line only; opened from October 1908; closed 17 September 1956;
- Waterloo Halt; up line only; opened October 1908; closed 17 September 1956;
- White Hart Halt; opened 12 May 1947; closed 30 June 1952;
- Machen; above.

== Brecon Mountain Railway ==
The Brecon Mountain Railway operates a narrow-gauge steam-hauled tourist line along the former Brecon and Merthyr Railway trackbed over a 5.5-mile (8.9 km) section of the B&MTJR, from Pant through Pontsticill to Torpantau, a distance of five miles.

== Remaining vehicles ==
Only one B&MTJR coach has survived into the present day; the body (only) of coach No.111 stands in a private residence at Armscote. (2017) A goods wagon, no.197 is currently (2017) at the Severn Valley Railway.

== National Cycle Network ==
Some sections of the route have become part of the National Cycle Network. These routes are NCN 4 (Celtic Trail) between Machen and Trethomas, NCN 469 between Bargoed and Fochriw and NCN 8 (Taff Trail) between Torpantau and Talybont Reservoir. NCN 468 runs from Aberbargoed northwards.
