= Chapel of the Holy Rood, Bagworth =

Chapel in Bagworth, Leicestershire, England

Coordinates: 52.66742°N 1.33674°W

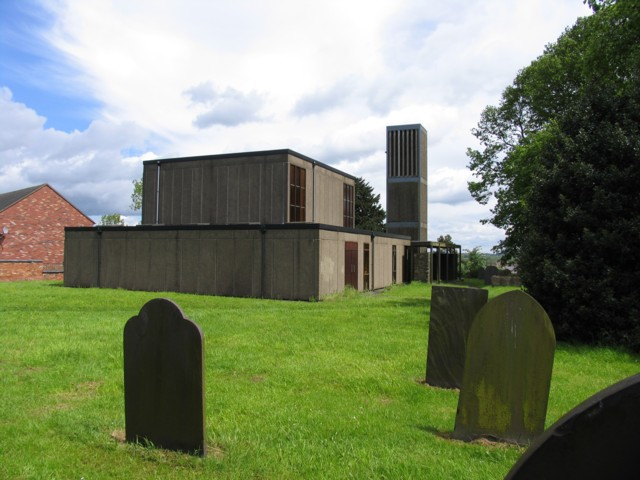
- Denomination: Church of England

History
- Dedication: Holy Rood

Administration
- Diocese: Leicester
- Archdeaconry: Loughborough
- Parish: Bagworth, Leicestershire

Clergy
- Rector: Andrew Smith
- Pastor(s): Simon Nicholls

The Chapel of the Holy Rood was a Church of England chapel in Bagworth, Leicestershire. It closed in 2013 to worship and was demolished in 2019. Now, a war memorial garden occupies the site of the church with the graveyard and some remnants of the church still visible. The congregation and church now meets at the nearby Bagworth Community Centre.

== History ==
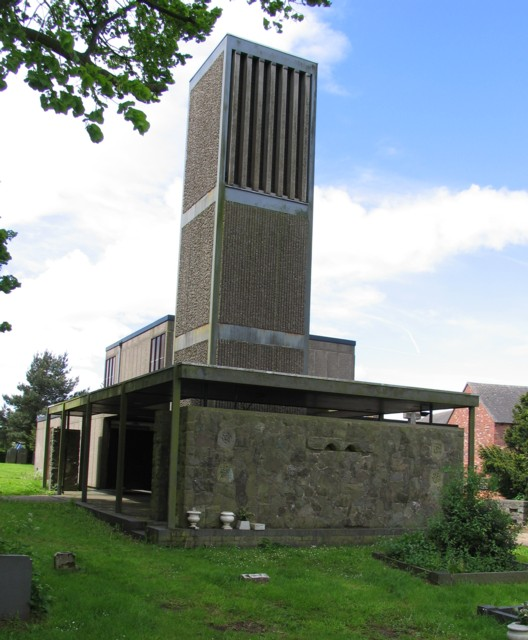
Belltower

The chapel was a dependent chapelry of St Peter's Church, Thornton. It was described, in 1848, as having walls dating from 1637 and having a Saxon door. The entire church, except the tower, was rebuilt in 1873. The church was demolished in 1968.

The new chapel was square and consisted of a raised altar, nave, lobby, two aisles and a separate tower, which contained two bells. Some remains of the earlier Norman church could be seen in the walls. The font survived from the earlier building. The site was demolished in 2019 after being left unused since 2013.
