= Jim Sperry =

Jim Sperry may refer to:

- James Sperry, English cricketer
- Jim Sperry (politician), member of the South Dakota House of Representatives
