= Thornton railway station (disambiguation) =

Thornton railway station may refer to:

- Thornton railway station, Yorkshire, England (disused)
- Thornton railway station, New South Wales, Australia
- Thornton Abbey railway station, Lincolnshire, England
- Thornton–Cleveleys railway station, Lancashire, England (disused)
- Thornton-in-Craven railway station, Yorkshire, England (disused)
- Thornton Dale railway station, Yorkshire, England (disused)
- Thornton Lane railway station, Leicestershire, England (disused)
- Glenrothes with Thornton railway station, Fife, Scotland
- Ingleton Thornton station, also known as Ingleton (L&NW) railway station, Yorkshire, England (disused)
- Stanlow and Thornton railway station, Cheshire, England
