= James Sperry =

English cricketer (1910–1997)

Personal information
- Full name: James Sperry
- Born: 19 March 1910; Thornton, Leicestershire, England
- Died: 21 April 1997 (aged 87); Thornton, Leicestershire, England
- Nickname: Jim
- Batting: Left-handed
- Bowling: Left-arm fast-medium
- Role: Bowler

Domestic team information
- Years: Team
- 1937–52: Leicestershire
- First-class debut: 19 June 1937 Leicestershire v Lancashire
- Last First-class: 10 June 1952 Leicestershire v Essex

Career statistics
Competition	First-class
Matches	188
Runs scored	1193
Batting average	7.18
100s/50s	–/–
Top score	35
Balls bowled	33139
Wickets	492
Bowling average	28.36
5 wickets in innings	19
10 wickets in match	4
Best bowling	7/19
Catches/stumpings	52/–
- Source: CricketArchive, 11 August 2013

James Sperry (19 March 1910 – 21 April 1997) was an English cricketer. He was a tail-end left-handed batsman and a left-arm fast-medium in-swing bowler who played first-class cricket for Leicestershire from 1937 to 1952. He was born in Thornton, Leicestershire and died there as well.

== Pre-war cricket ==
Sperry was a miner at Bagworth colliery who was 27 before he appeared in senior cricket. He made his first-class debut for Leicestershire in a single match in 1937 when he made little impression, failing to take a wicket and not being required to bat. In 1938, with the decline and imminent retirement of George Geary, who had been the mainstay of the bowling attack since before the First World War, Leicestershire gave Sperry an extended trial in the second half of the season and he responded with 27 wickets.

The 1939 season was a very poor one for Leicestershire, who finished at the bottom of the County Championship, but Wisden Cricketers' Almanack noted "notable advancement" by Sperry who, it said, often endured long spells of work". In all matches, he was the county's biggest wicket-taker, with 78 wickets at an average of 23.88. Leicestershire won only one match all season, and Sperry was at the heart of it: in the match against Hampshire, he took seven-second innings wickets for 19 runs, to give match figures of 10 for 71 – the innings figures would remain the best of his career. After the game, Sperry was presented with the ball, inscribed by the Leicestershire County Club committee; he was also awarded his county cap in the 1939 season.

== Post-war cricket ==
The Leicestershire club that Sperry returned to in 1946 after the Second World War was a rather different side from that of 1939: other seam bowlers such as William Flamson and Haydon Smith were either dead or retired, and the attack centred on the spin bowling of Jack Walsh and Vic Jackson. Sperry played regularly in the first six post-war seasons as often the only regular seam bowler, sometimes having Jackson's off-breaks as the other opening bowler. His best return was in the 1948 season, when he took 81 wickets in all matches at an average of 23.55; his average was better in 1951, when his 62 wickets cost just 22.70, but in some other seasons he averaged more than 33 runs per wicket, high for a regular bowler in the period in which he played. He retired at the age of 41 after the 1951 season but returned for two games in 1952 when he was granted a benefit match by Leicestershire.

Sperry's only first-class match that was not for Leicestershire came in 1947, when he appeared in a festival match at Harrogate in which two teams composed largely of county rather than Test players played a game organised by Maurice Leyland, who had retired from full-time cricket the previous year.

In his obituary in the 1998 edition of Wisden the Leicestershire cricket historian Philip Snow was quoted: "(Sperry) appeared frail, but would bowl loyally until the point of fatigue. A rather lugubrious, pallid countenance hid unfailing amiability. He was a man of excellent team spirit."
