= Bagworth =

Village in Leicestershire, England

Coordinates: 52.672°N 01.343°W

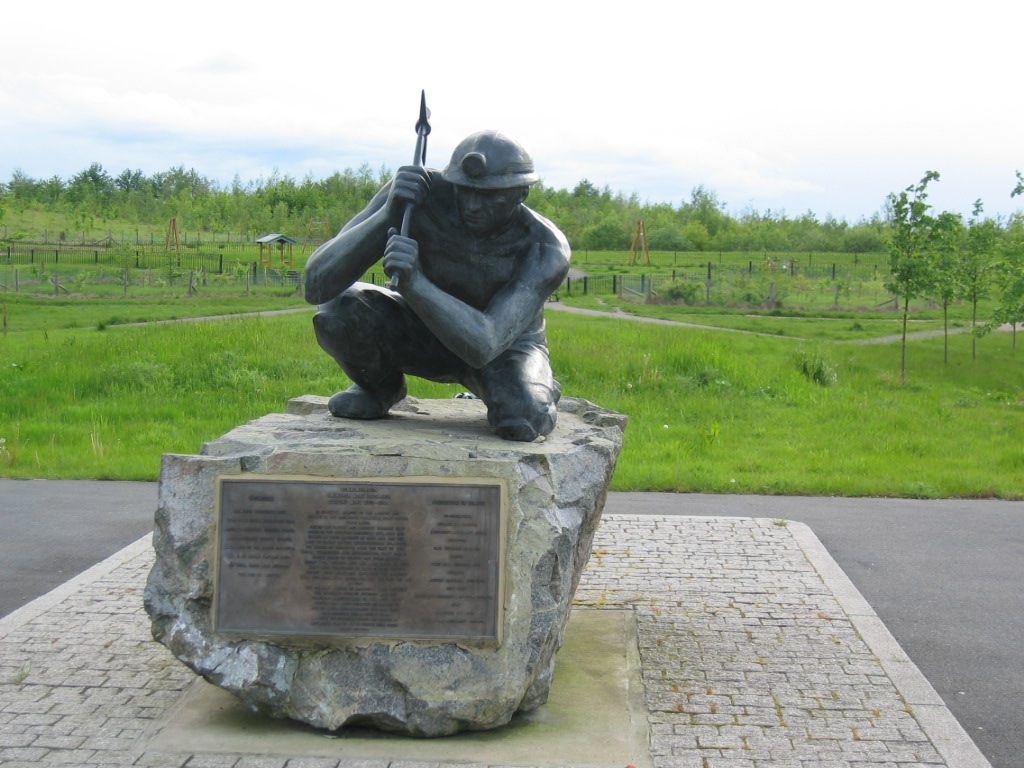
- A statue of a coal miner in Bagworth, commemorating the village's industrial heritage.

- Location within Leicestershire
- Population: 3,500
- OS grid reference: SK4408
- Civil parish: Bagworth and Thornton
- District: Hinckley and Bosworth
- Shire county: Leicestershire
- Region: East Midlands
- Country: England
- Sovereign state: United Kingdom
- Post town: Coalville
- Postcode district: LE67
- Dialling code: 01530
- Police: Leicestershire
- Fire: Leicestershire
- Ambulance: East Midlands
- UK Parliament: Mid Leicestershire
- Website: Bagworth & Thornton Parish Council

Bagworth is a village in the civil parish of Bagworth and Thornton, in the Hinckley and Bosworth district, in Leicestershire, England, 9 miles (14 km) west of Leicester.

== History ==
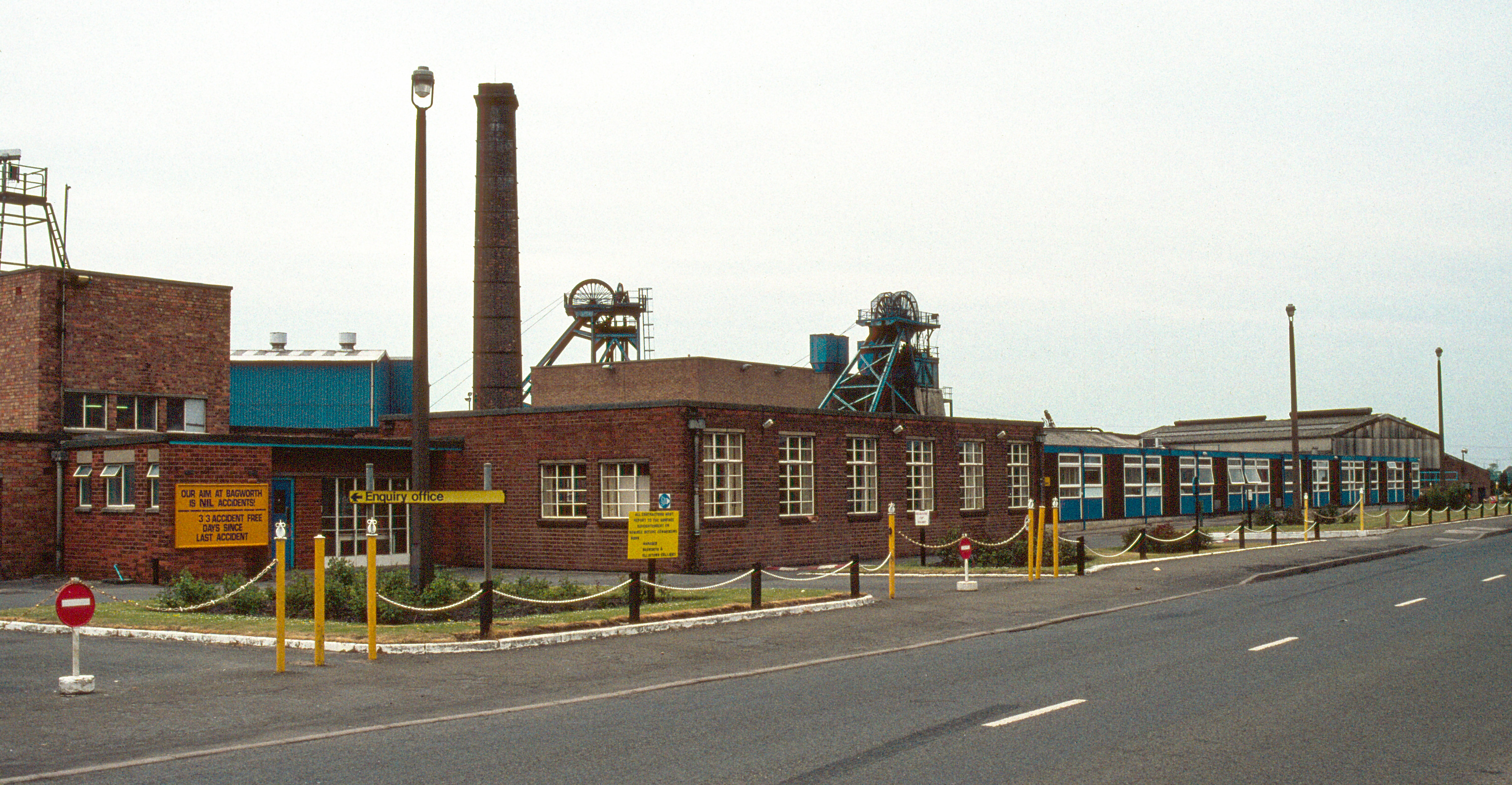
Bagworth Colliery in 1990.

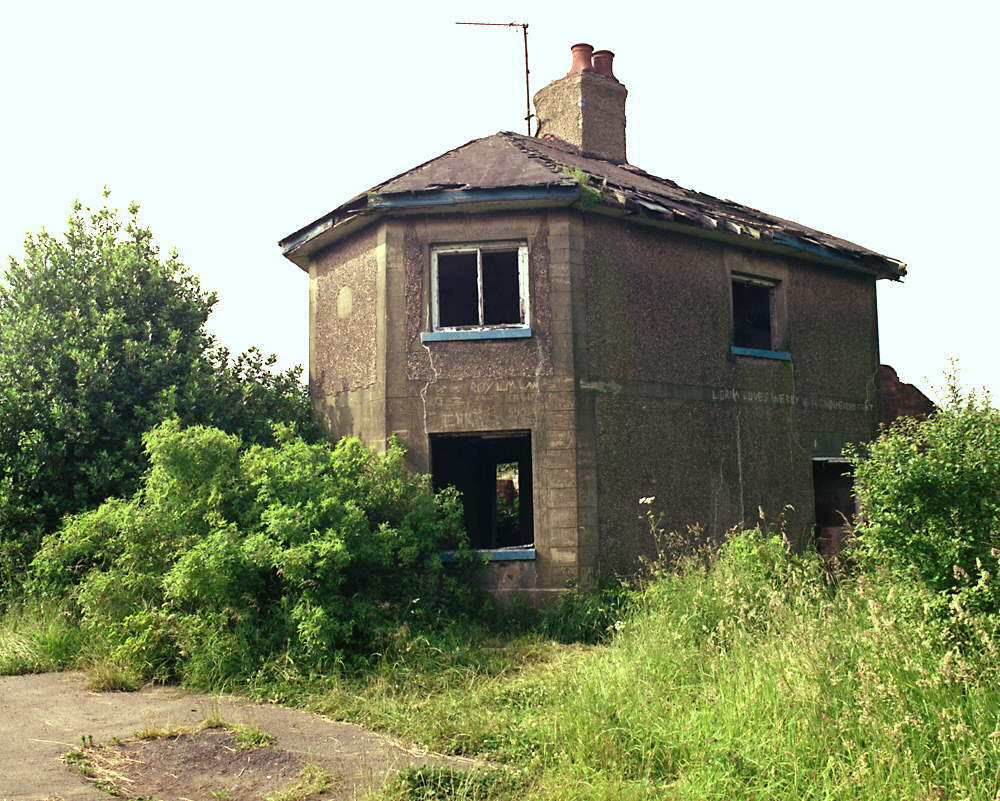
The incline-keeper's house at the top of Bagworth incline in 1985, before it was allowed to fall down.

The village's name means 'the enclosure of Baecga'.

There are records of the manor of Bagworth from the early 14th and early 15th centuries, when it was held by the same feudal lords as the neighbouring manor of Thornton.

Bagworth Park is first recorded in 1279 under ownership of the Bishop of Durham. In 1318 Roger de Holland was given permission to fortify his property at Bagworth. It is recorded under the ownership of Matilda Lovell in 1411. The Lovell family later sold the land to the Hastings family. Development of the site was granted to William, Lord Hastings by Edward IV in 1474 for "crenellation and emparkment of 2000 acres of land" along with the castle developments at Ashby de la Zouche and Kirby Muxloe but there is no indication of any building by Hastings on the site prior to his execution by Richard III in 1483. A later moated house was developed on the site by Sir Robert Banaster in 1616.

In 1761 Baron Maynard funded the building and endowment of a village school for Bagworth.

The then Viscount Maynard had the first shaft of Bagworth Colliery sunk in 1828 and, initially, the coal was carried to Leicester by road.

In 1832 the Leicester and Swannington Railway was opened. It passed within 1/2-mile (800 m) of Bagworth and provided a railway station to serve the village at the foot of the rope-worked Bagworth Incline, and a convenient connection to the colliery at the top of the incline.

The Midland Railway took over the Leicester and Swannington in 1845 and built a gentler graded deviation line which bypassed the old incline and opened a new Bagworth railway station 1 mile (1.6 km) north of the centre of the old village in 1849. The new station was renamed Bagworth and Ellistown in 1894 to reflect the nearby colliery village that had developed since Ellistown colliery was sunk in 1873. British Railways withdrew passenger services from the line and closed the station in September 1964. The railway remains open for freight.

Bagworth Colliery was connected underground to Nailstone Colliery in 1966. There the coal was raised, washed, and transported by train back along a branch line to interchange sidings next to the site of Bagworth and Ellistown station. In 1980 the branch line from Nailstone colliery was replaced by a conveyor belt which transported the coal to a rapid loader to the north of the site of Bagworth and Ellistown station. The colliery closed in 1991 when economic reserves were exhausted and the rapid loader was demolished.

In the 1990s BR planned to restore Leicester to Burton upon Trent Line passenger services through Bagworth as the second phase of its Ivanhoe Line project. However, after the privatisation of British Rail in 1995 this phase of the project was discontinued. In 2009 the Association of Train Operating Companies published a £49 million proposal to restore passenger services to the line that would include reopening a station at Bagworth.

In 1931 the parish had a population of 1568. On 1 April 1935 the parish of Thornton was merged with Bagworth, on 13 August 2001 the parish was renamed "Bagworth & Thornton".

== Chapels ==
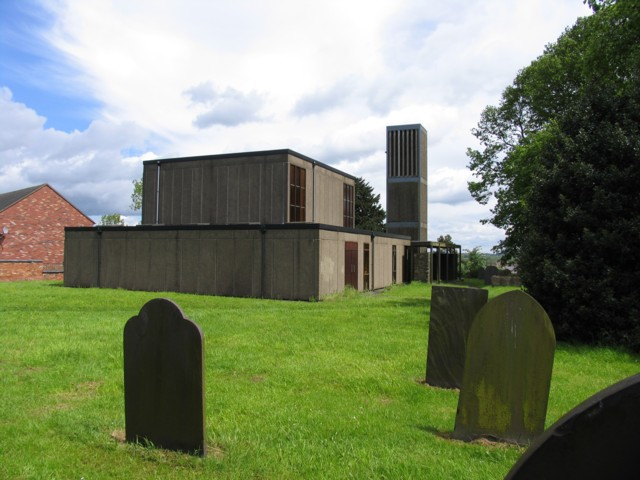
Chapel of the Holy Rood, Bagworth

The Chapel of the Holy Rood, Bagworth was a dependent chapelry of the parish church of Saint Peter, Thornton. In 1848 Holy Rood was described as having a Saxon door and that its walls bore the date 1637. In 1873 the entire church except for the tower was rebuilt in granite with limestone dressings, with buttresses banded with red brick and blue vitrified brick. In the 20th century the Victorian church and medieval tower suffered subsidence so in 1968 they were demolished. They were replaced with a new modern church building that is unusual in being built of CLASP prefabricated concrete panels. This building decayed fairly rapidly and was unused for a number of years before its demolition in 2019. The site has now been grassed over. The graveyard and a few relics of the earlier church remain.

Holy Rood is now part of the Church of England parish of Thornton Bagworth and Stanton, which is part of a united benefice with the parishes of Copt Oak and Markfield.

By 1848 Bagworth had also a General Baptists' chapel.

== Amenities ==
Bagworth had a public house, The Maynard, opposite the former railway station. It was closed in 2008 due to a fire and has since been demolished to make way for development of a shop and houses. There were also 2 other public houses in Bagworth and they were The Barrel (closed in 1980s and demolished) and The Rose and Crown which is a private residence having closed in the first half of the 20th century. Bagworth Heath Woods is nearby.

== Sources ==
- Lewis, Samuel, ed. (1931) [1848]. A Topographical Dictionary of England (Seventh ed.). London: Samuel Lewis. pp. 128–132.
- Pevsner, Nikolaus (1960). Leicestershire and Rutland. The Buildings of England. Harmondsworth: Penguin Books. p. 57.
