= Thornton Lane railway station =

Disused railway station in Thornton, Leicestershire

Coordinates: 52.6676°N 1.3243°W

Thornton Lane

General information
- Location: Thornton, Leicestershire; England

Other information
- Status: Disused

History
- Original company: Midland Railway
- Pre-grouping: Midland Railway

Key dates
- 1850: Opened
- 1 October 1865: Closed

Thornton Lane railway station served the village of Thornton, Leicestershire, England, from 1850 to 1865 on the Leicester and Swannington Railway.

== History ==
The station was opened in 1850 by the Midland Railway. It was only used on Saturdays. It closed on 1 October 1865.

Preceding station	Historical railways	Following station
Merry Lees; Line open, station closed	Leicester and Swannington Railway	Bagworth; Line open, station closed
