= Ellistown and Battleflat =

Civil parish in Leicestershire, England

Coordinates: 52.694°N 1.353°W

Ellistown and Battleflat is a civil parish in North West Leicestershire, England, just south of the town of Coalville. Most of the parish's population lives in the village of Ellistown in the western part of the parish. The population of the civil parish at the 2011 census (including Bardon) was 2,626.

Battleflat is a scattered settlement of farms and an industrial estate. Battleflat straddles the boundary between the parish and its neighbour of Stanton under Bardon. Battleflat was formerly divided between the parishes of Thornton and Ibstock. The toponym is said to be derived from a skirmish during the English Civil War.
