= Bagworth and Thornton =

Civil parish in Leicestershire, England

Coordinates: 52.67°N 1.33°W

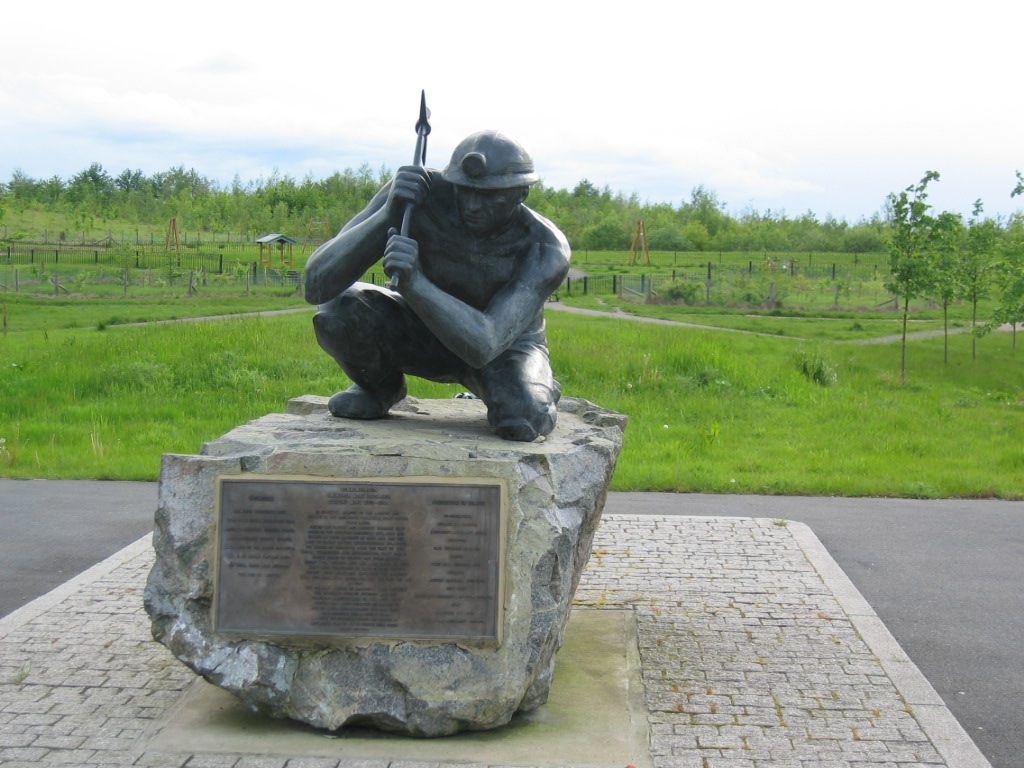
- A statue of a coal miner in Bagworth, to commemorate the village's heritage.

- Location within Leicestershire
- Civil parish: Bagworth and Thornton
- District: Hinckley and Bosworth
- Shire county: Leicestershire
- Region: East Midlands
- Country: England
- Sovereign state: United Kingdom

Bagworth and Thornton, formerly just Bagworth is a civil parish in the Hinckley and Bosworth district of Leicestershire, England, west of Leicester. The 2001 Census recorded a population of 1,836, increasing at the 2011 census to 2,605. The parish includes the villages of Bagworth and Thornton.

== History ==
On 1 April 1935 the parish of Thornton was merged with Bagworth on 13 August 2001 the parish was renamed "Bagworth & Thornton".
