= Lemuel Abbott =

English clergyman and poet

Lemuel Abbott (ca. 1730 – April 1776) was an English clergyman and poet.

== Life ==
Little is known of his background, but he was a curate in Anstey, and vicar of Thornton, both in Leicestershire. He is known to posterity primarily for his collection of poems titled Poems on Various Subjects, whereto is Prefixed a Short Essay on the Structure of English Verse, published in 1765. Abbott and his wife Mary were probably the parents of the artist Lemuel Francis Abbott.
