= Merry Lees railway station =

Former railway station in Leicestershire, England

General information
- Location: Merry Lees, Hinckley and Bosworth; England
- Coordinates: 52.6481°N 1.3070°W

Other information
- Status: Disused

History
- Original company: Leicester and Swannington Railway
- Pre-grouping: Midland Railway

Key dates
- 18 July 1832: First Merry Lees station opened
- 27 March 1848: Second Merry Lees station opened
- date unknown: Station renamed Merrylees
- 1 March 1871: Station closed
Location

Merry Lees was a railway station on the Leicester to Burton upon Trent Line in Leicestershire. It was opened in 1832 and closed in 1871.

The Leicester and Swannington Railway opened the first Merry Lees station on 18 July 1832. The Midland Railway took over the line in 1845 and replaced the station with a second one 150 yards (140 m) to the north on 27 March 1848. The Midland renamed the station Merrylees station some time thereafter, and closed it on 1 March 1871. For the entire period from 1832 to 1871 the station was run by a station mistress, Mary Argyle.

Preceding station	Historical railways	Following station
Desford; Line open, station closed	Midland Railway; Leicester to Burton upon Trent Line	Thornton Lane; Line open, station closed
