= Bagworth Heath Woods =

UK natural landmark

Coordinates: 52°39′24.66″N 1°19′27.65″W

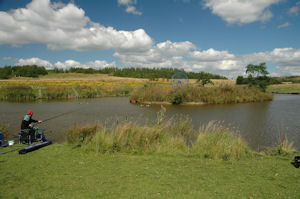
Bagworth Heath Fishing Lake

Bagworth Heath Woods is a 75-hectare (185-acre) country park on the location of the former Desford Colliery, in Leicestershire, England consisting of woodland, grassland, heathland, lakes and ponds. The site was built on the land of a reclaimed coal mine.

The site is linked to Thornton and Bagworth by the 100-mile circular walk around Leicestershire called the Leicestershire Round.
