= Thornton, Leicestershire =

Village in Leicestershire, England

Coordinates: 52.66°N 01.31°W

Thornton
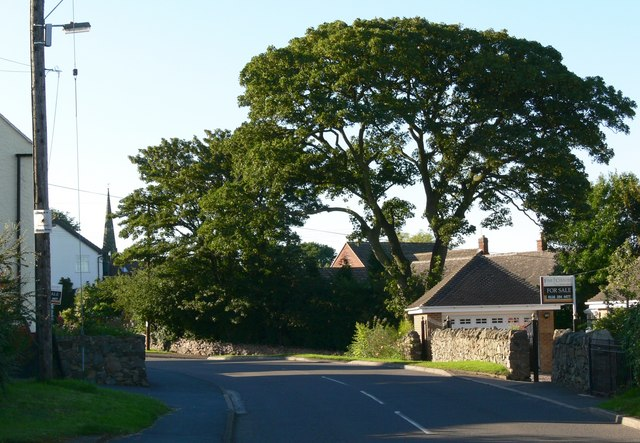
- Merrylees Road, Thornton photographed in July 2007

- Location within Leicestershire
- OS grid reference: SK4607
- Civil parish: Bagworth and Thornton
- District: Hinckley and Bosworth
- Shire county: Leicestershire
- Region: East Midlands
- Country: England
- Sovereign state: United Kingdom
- Post town: Coalville
- Postcode district: LE67
- Police: Leicestershire
- Fire: Leicestershire
- Ambulance: East Midlands
- UK Parliament: Mid Leicestershire
- Website: thorntonvillage.org

Thornton is a village in the civil parish of Bagworth and Thornton, in the Hinckley and Bosworth district, in the county of Leicestershire, England. It is a linear village lying along a scarp overlooking Thornton Reservoir.

The Church of England parish church of St Peter was built in the 13th century. The church door was originally at Ulverscroft Priory. The priory door is inside the church and not its main external door. It is believed that the door was the only compensation received for the loss of tithes due to the Reformation of Henry VIII. It was reported in November 2011 that the church is being split in two by subsidence. In 1931 the parish had a population of 711. On 1 April 1935 the parish was abolished and merged with Bagworth.

The first historical notice of Thornton, otherwise called "Torinton" is that in the Domesday Book completed in 1086 AD. In it Thornton, or Torentum, comes under the manor of Bagworde (Bagworth).

== Benefactions ==
There were many in the parish but the following 2 are most significant. 1. In 1630 Luke Jackson gave by will one third of the tithes of Stanton Under Bardon in the parish of Thornton to the poor of the parish for ever. This benefitted the vicar of Thornton to the tune of £2 for preaching 2 sermons on 28 July each year in remembrance of the defeat of the Spanish Armada in 1588 and on 5 November in commemoration of deliverance from the Gunpowder Plot of 1605. This benefaction comes from the fact that Mr Jackson acquired the tithes at the time of the Reformation when in fact they were rightly belonging to the Church. 2. William Grundy of Thornton, gentlemen, gave by will, a house and garden in Thornton to the poor forever.

== Railway ==
From 1832 until 1871 Thornton was served partly by Merry Lees railway station on the Leicester and Swannington Railway. The Stag and Castle Inn built in 1832 served as a station in Thornton Hollow, part way between Thornton and Bagworth until 1865. This is now a private residence.

On 4 May 1833 an accident occurred at Thornton Lane level crossing (now a bridge). The gates had been left open and a train ran into a horse and cart, the driver of which had not heard the engine driver's bugle. The Company had to pay for a new horse and cart along with fifty pounds of butter and eighty dozen eggs. George Stephenson, the line being laid out by Robert Stephenson in 1832, devised the steam whistle. It was constructed by a Leicester musical instrument maker and of course it became standard equipment on most steam trains afterwards.

== Local features ==
Thornton Reservoir has an area of 75 acres (30 ha). It was constructed in 1851 and during excavation traces of a presumed Roman road were seen. It is no longer used as a source of drinking water and was opened for trout fishing in the mid 1970s but due to the demise of the company managing the fishery, there is currently no fishing. Severn Trent Water opened it to the public for walking in 1997. There is 1 public house here, The Bricklayers Arms., along with a Working Men's Club. The Reservoir Inn (previously known as The Bulls Head, The Tipsy Fisherman, and The Steam Trumpet) closed for good in 2019. It was once the site of a slaughter house though it is unclear whether this was at the same time that it was a drinking establishment. The building is being converted into a number of apartments but as of February 2026 this is still incomplete. Thornton was originally a farming village but, with the coming of the collieries in Bagworth and the Coalville area, many miners lived in Thornton too. There was no colliery or mine workings in Thornton and it is understood that underground faults made any coal under Thornton unworkable. Some believe that the collieries of Desford and Bagworth failed to mine below Thornton, and thus deny it the ravages of subsidence, as it may have caused severe damage to the railway or drained the reservoir, this is hearsay. Bagworth Heath Woods now stands on the site of Desford colliery. Desford Colliery being the nearest one to Thornton closed in 1984

Nearby is Brown's Wood, formerly Manor Farm Woodland, which was planted in part due to the heavy metal group Iron Maiden liaising with The Carbon Neutral Company to plant enough saplings to offset the carbon dioxide generated by the production and distribution of their 2003 album Dance of Death.

== Notable residents ==
- Leslie Cave of Horsepool Grange, Thornton, living 1619
- Lemuel Abbott was vicar here 1773 to his death in 1776, a poet and clergyman.
- Pete Lawrence, astronomer
