= Leicester and Swannington Railway =

Early British railway company (1832–1846)

The Leicester and Swannington Railway (L&SR) was one of England's first railways, built to bring coal from West Leicestershire collieries to Leicester, where there was great industrial demand for coal. The line opened in 1832, and included a tunnel over a mile in length, and two rope-worked inclined planes; elsewhere it was locomotive-operated, and it carried passengers.

When it was built, the L&SR was the only railway in the area, but the Midland Railway (MR) was formed and had a main line through Leicester, opened in 1840 (Note: By the Midland Counties Railway.) and its directors decided to acquire the L&SR. They made a generous offer and they took possession in 1847. At first the Midland Railway line and the L&SR were not connected, but the Midland Railway constructed a route from its main line to Burton, using part of the L&SR. The MR by-passed the inclines for its new route, but most of the other parts of the L&SR continued in use until 1966. The MR Burton line continues in use at the present day.

== Prior history ==
The industry of Leicester was dominant in the county and the region generally, but it was limited by poor transport links. The developing industry brought about a huge demand for coal. During the closing years of the eighteenth century, the opening of turnpikes, and improvements to the River Soar – the Loughborough Navigation in 1778; the Leicester Navigation in 1791) and then in 1814 the completion of the Grand Union Canal towards Rugby – were all supportive of Leicester's development.

As early as 1790 a railway connection from Swannington was proposed:

[On 12 July 1790] a meeting was held at the castle of Leicester in order finally to determine upon a general plan of navigation in this country. Lord Rawdon opened the business of the meeting... and laid before them the outline of a plan, viz., the [River] Soar to be made navigable to Loughborough, and a cut, or railway, from Swannington and the neighbourhood to the Bason at Loughborough.

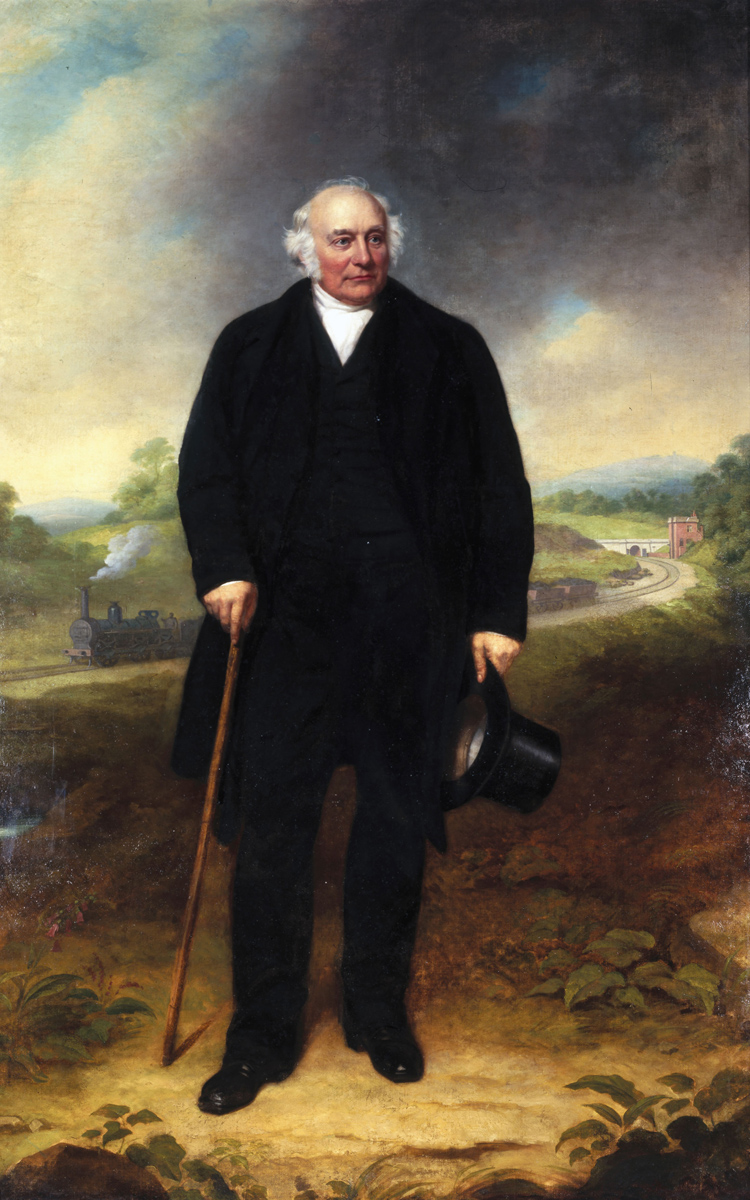
John Ellis by John Lucas

In the 1820s the Leicester Navigation was carrying 56,000 tons of coal annually for Leicester and 59,000 tons for other markets. There was good quality coal nearby around Swannington but no usable transport link, so it was cheaper to bring coal thirty miles by canal from South Derbyshire. William Stenson was part-owner of Long Lane Pit near Whitwick (close to present-day Coalville). Frustrated by the situation, he visited the industrial north-east of England in 1827 and observed the success of the Stockton and Darlington Railway. Seeing a railway as a solution to his local difficulty, he enlisted the support of the wealthy weaver John Ellis, and together they travelled to see George Stephenson, who was engaged on the construction of the Liverpool and Manchester Railway. Stephenson and his son Robert Stephenson, then 25, visited Leicester by invitation in the Autumn of 1828.

== Conception of the Leicester and Swannington Railway ==
Leicester and Swannington Railway Act 1830
- Act of Parliament
- Parliament of the United Kingdom
- Long title: An Act for making and maintaining a Railway or Tramroad from the River Soar, near the West Bridge in or near the Borough of Leicester to Swannington, in the County of Leicester, and four Branches therefrom.
- Citation: 11 Geo. 4 & 1 Will. 4. c. lviii

Dates
- Royal assent: 29 May 1830

Text of statute as originally enacted

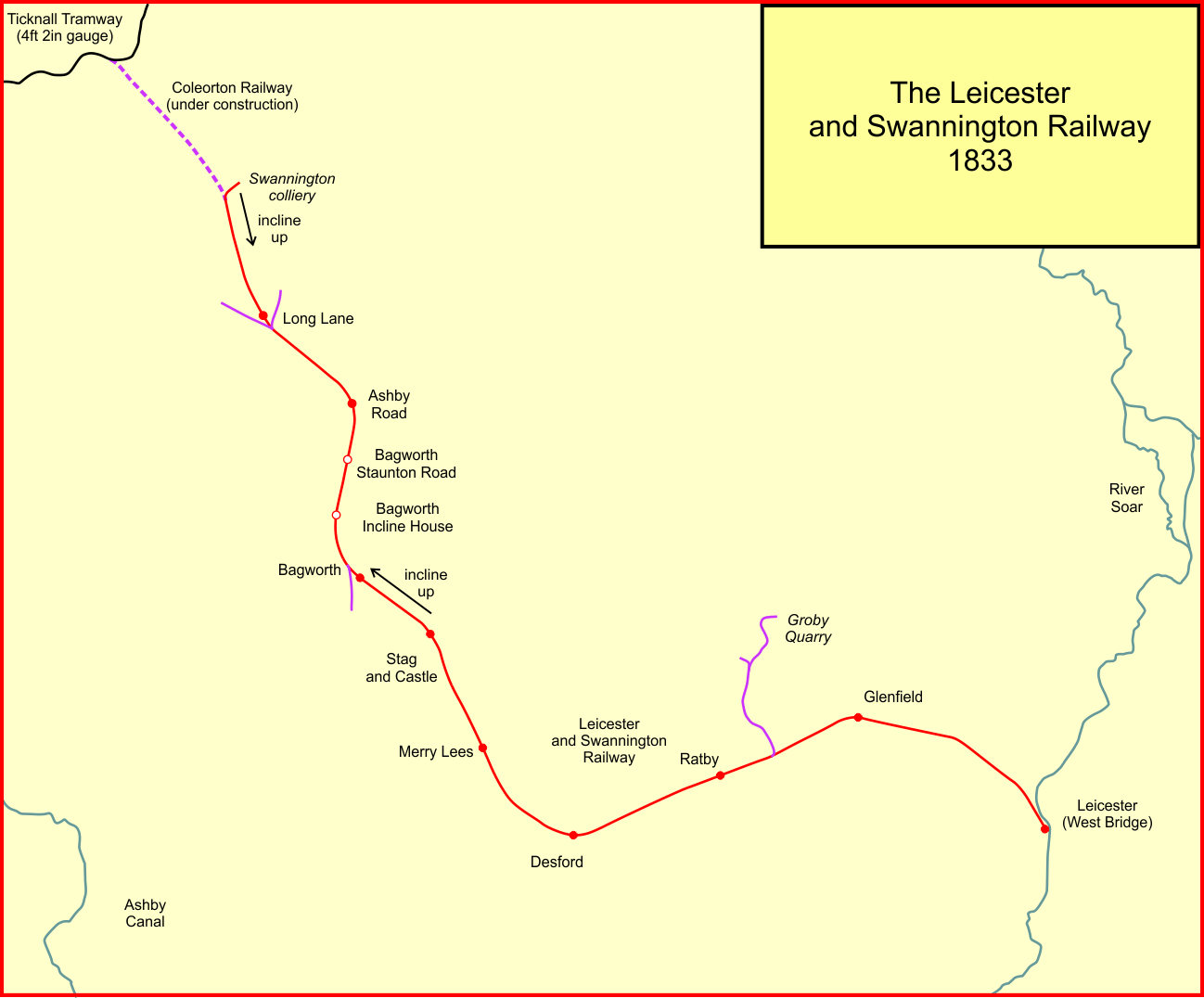
The Leicester and Swannington Railway in 1833

George Stephenson agreed to become involved in making a railway line from Swannington to Leicester; the first formal meeting to project the line was held at the Bell Inn in Leicester on 12 February 1829. At a further meeting on 24 June 1829, Robert Stephenson stated that a sixteen-mile line could be built for £75,540. Subscriptions amounting to £58,250 were raised at this meeting. The remainder of the £90,000 necessary for the construction of was raised through Stephenson's financial contacts in Liverpool. The act of incorporation for the line, the Leicester and Swannington Railway Act 1830 (11 Geo. 4 & 1 Will. 4. c. lviii), obtained royal assent on 29 May 1830. Authorised share capital was £90,000. The act prescribed that the company might carry goods, that is, operate as a carrier and not merely as a provider of the route for independent carriers.

George Stephenson was consulted about the track gauge to be selected for the line, as compared to that of the Canterbury and Whitstable line, and is quoted as saying:

"Make them of the same width; though they may be a long way apart now, depend upon it they will be joined together some day."

Williams stresses the magnitude of the undertaking:

Although but a single line 16 miles long, it was only the fifth line to be authorised in England and was opened six years before Birmingham was connected to London by rail. The Glenfield Tunnel was by any standard a major undertaking, and in 1830 called for great courage on the part of the engineer and the proprietors.

When completed it was the first locomotive railway in the Midland counties, and only the second south of Manchester, after the Canterbury and Whitstable Railway.

Leicester and Swannington Railway Act 1833
- Act of Parliament
- Parliament of the United Kingdom
- Long title: An Act to enable the Company of Proprietors of the Leicester and Swannington Railway to execute additional Works and Branches, and for altering and amending the Powers of the Act relating to the said Railway.
- Citation: 3 & 4 Will. 4. c. lxix

Dates
- Royal assent: 10 June 1833

Text of statute as originally enacted

Leicester and Swannington Railway Company Act 1837
- Act of Parliament
- Parliament of the United Kingdom
- Long title: An Act to enable the Leicester and Swannington Railway Company to raise a further Sum of Money.
- Citation: 7 Will. 4 & 1 Vict. c. lxvi

Dates
- Royal assent: 30 June 1837

A second act for the company, the Leicester and Swannington Railway Act 1833 (3 & 4 Will. 4. c. lxix), was obtained on 10 June 1833 giving authority to increase the share capital by £10,000. There was a third act of 30 June 1837, the Leicester and Swannington Railway Company Act 1837 (7 Will. 4 & 1 Vict. c. lxvi), which authorised £40,000 increase in share capital, making a total of £140,000.

== Construction ==
The engineer for the railway was Robert Stephenson, with the assistance of Thomas Miles, while George Stephenson raised part of the capital for the line from businesspeople in Liverpool. The line was to run from West Bridge, in Leicester, at a location alongside the navigable River Soar; the intention was to be able to continue the transit of coal by water. The line was to run to the north end of Swannington village, together with three colliery branches, to Whitwick, Ibstock and Bagworth. In addition there was to be a branch in Leicester to the North Bridge, although that was never made. The colliery branches, and the land acquisition for them, were authorised by the Leicester and Swannington Railway Act 1830, but the actual construction of them would be the financial responsibility of the colliery owners.

There was to be one tunnel, at Glenfield, just over a mile in length. Nine underbridges and one overbridge would be needed, and sixteen level crossings over public roads. The line was to be single throughout, except at stations.

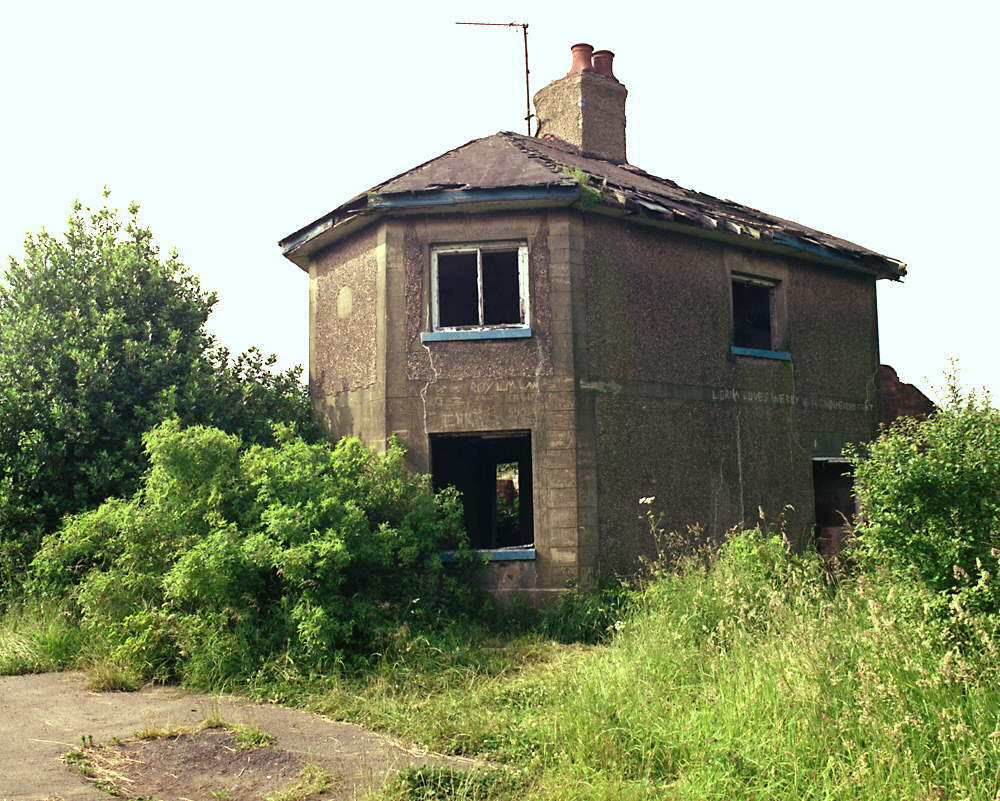
The incline-keeper's house at the top of Bagworth incline in 1985.

The terrain was difficult, and due to the limited power of locomotives at the time, the line was built with two rope-worked inclined planes. One was at Bagworth; on a gradient of 1 in 29 it was self-acting, loaded wagons descending pulling up empty wagons. Originally it was to have been powered by a stationary steam engine. The top level was the summit of the line at an altitude of 565 ft (172 m). The engine was built by the Horseley Coal and Iron Company., (Note: Sometimes spelt Horsely.) and was equipped with a very early example of a piston valve. The other was near Swannington, on a gradient of 1 in 17 against the load. (Note: The loaded wagons had to climb the gradient and the lighter empty wagons descended.)

The line was standard gauge, with fish-bellied rails on half-round oak cross-sleepers, but longitudinal timbers were used in Glenfield Tunnel.

Construction began almost immediately but soon ran into trouble, particularly with the tunnel. Initial boring had suggested that it would not need a lining. However, it turned out that about 500 yards (460 m) would be through sand, requiring much more expensive construction, and in fact doubling the estimated cost of the tunnel. During its construction, on 5 April 1831, one of the contractors, Daniel Jowett, fell down a working shaft and was killed. Three separate contractors gave up their contracts and had to be replaced.

The novelty of a tunnel attracted the interest of local people and in March 1832 temporary gates were placed at the entrances "so as to keep out intruders on Sundays until the permanent gates can be put up".

== Opening and early operation ==
=== First formal journey ===
A formal opening of the first part of the line took place on 17 July 1832; a passenger journey for proprietors and directors and their friends only, ran from the West Bridge terminus in Leicester to the summit level at Staunton Road crossing, a distance of 11 miles 55 chains (19 km). The inaugural train was drawn by the locomotive Comet and consisted of an open wagon specially covered in for use of the directors, the company's only open second-class carriage and ten new coal wagons with improvised seats, conveying in all about 400 passengers. It left West Bridge at 10:00 and reached Bagworth at 11:00 "A slight delay was caused by the engine chimney striking the roof of the tunnel at a point where the platelayers had temporarily raised the track to pack a 'low' place. The train was halted specially at Glenfield Brook to enable the passengers, especially the ladies, to remove the effects of the enforced sojourn in the tunnel." The return journey conveyed two wagons of coal in addition.

=== Public opening ===
The general public were able to travel to Bagworth and back by a second special train at 16:30. On the next day, the ordinary train service started; this usually consisted of three empty wagon trains each weekday, leaving West Bridge at 08:00, 13:00 and 16:30; the passenger carriage was attached to these and the corresponding return loaded trips. Apparently, special passenger trips were run for a few weeks after opening, until the novelty of a train journey had worn off.

=== Coal rates ===
At first only Bagworth colliery was connected to the line, and accordingly income from mineral traffic was far below what was planned. Pressing ahead with the construction of the northern section of the authorised line was called for. In addition, a rebate was offered to other coal owners whose workings were near to the open section but not connected by rail; the rebate was in recognition of the cost of road transport from those pits to the railway, and of the breakage of coal due to the additional transhipment. The rebate proved very effective and those pits forwarded considerably increased quantities.

=== Train operation ===
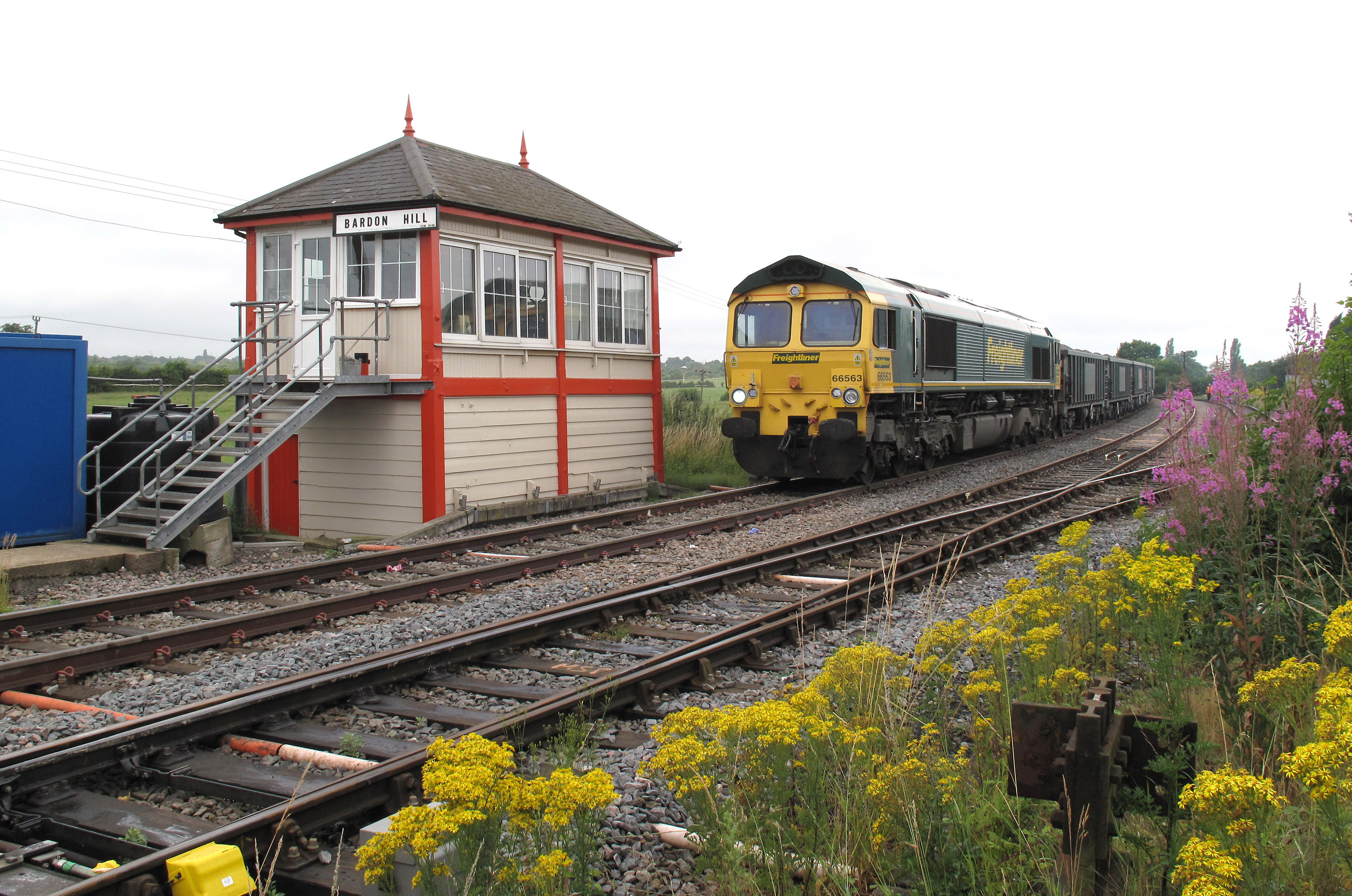
A train loaded with granite chippings from the Bardon Hill quarry

The usual train consisted of twenty-four wagons of 32 long hundredweight (1.6 t) each. The idea that there would be a demand from passengers came as something of a surprise to the directors, but a carriage was hastily built, and very soon the line was carrying about 60 passengers a day and their fares were repaying one per cent of the capital. In time, both first and second class was provided. On payment of the fare at the departure station, each passenger would receive a metal token marked with the destination. This would be given up on arrival and reused. Small four-wheeled wagons and coaches, painted plain blue, comprised the rolling stock.

Passenger ticket

For many years facilities for passengers remained primitive; tickets were procured at local inns; passenger carriages were attached to goods trains. At West Bridge carriages were drawn into a siding by horses once they had been detached from the goods wagons. It was well into the 1870s before a platform was provided, and the conveyance of passengers at the rear of coal trains continued until 1887. From that time the Midland Railway supplied a proper branch train of six-wheel carriages hauled by a Midland 0-6-0 tender locomotive.

=== Permanent way problems ===
The cross-sleepers were found to cause difficulties, especially in cuttings, and some sections were replaced with stone blocks. However the stone blocks required constant packing to maintain line, level and gauge, and were considered to be harder riding than timber sleepers. Nevertheless, some of the stone blocks continued in use until at least 1885.

=== Further opening ===
The remainder of the line from Staunton Road to Ashby Road opened on 1 February 1833 or a few days before that. From Ashby Road to Long Lane, Coalville, was opened on 22 April 1833 for coal traffic and on 27 April 1833 for passengers, completing the intended extent of passenger operation, as from that point to Swannington would be used for mineral traffic only. The continuation to Swannington probably opened at the end of November 1833.

=== Soar Lane, Leicester ===
There had previously been plans to extend at Leicester across the Leicester Canal to Soar Lane. The decision was taken to revive the Soar Lane branch on 22 October 1832. On 10 June 1833 the necessary powers were secured in the Leicester and Swannington Railway Act 1833; an opening bridge was required over the Leicester Canal. The branch was brought into use on 4 October 1834.

== Inclines ==
=== Bagworth incline operation ===
The Bagworth incline was 43 chains in length and the gradient 1 in 29. It was self-acting: the loaded wagons descended by gravity, pulling up the lighter, empty ones by means of a hemp rope. The rope passed around a large horizontal pulley at the top. When a train from Leicester arrived at the Bagworth station at the foot of the incline, the locomotive was detached and the empty wagons connected to the rope. The loaded waggons had been brought by another locomotive to the top, and they were attached to the other end of this rope. Their greater weight pulled the empty ones to the top. In the middle of the incline there was a passing place and from this loop to the top there were three rails, the centre rail being common to both up and down movements; the object of this was to account for the width of the wheel and the position of the rope. 10 or 12 loaded waggons of about 6 tonnes each were run down at one time the descent occupying eight or nine minutes.

=== Swannington Incline problems and later closure ===
The Swannington incline was 48 chains in length on a gradient of 1 in 17. It was operated by a stationary steam engine. The engine developed problems at the end of November 1833, and arrangements were had to be made to get horses to haul wagons up the incline. The working of the incline was entirely suspended on 7 March 1834, when the Breedon Hill lime and Peggs Green coal traffics stopped using the railways in protest against a rate increase. However the traffic resumed on 11 May.

Traffic at Swannington was never heavy, and the collieries there were soon worked out. The Coleorton Railway had been made to bring coal and other minerals from Worthington to Swannington, being transshipped to the L&SR, but this traffic ceased in 1860. Calcutta Colliery was the last to be closed, in 1892, but it had to continue being pumped out to prevent inundation of other pits in the vicinity. Coal was brought down the incline for the pumping engine, until electric pumps were installed in 1947, and the incline was closed on 14 November 1947.

=== Bagworth incline accident ===
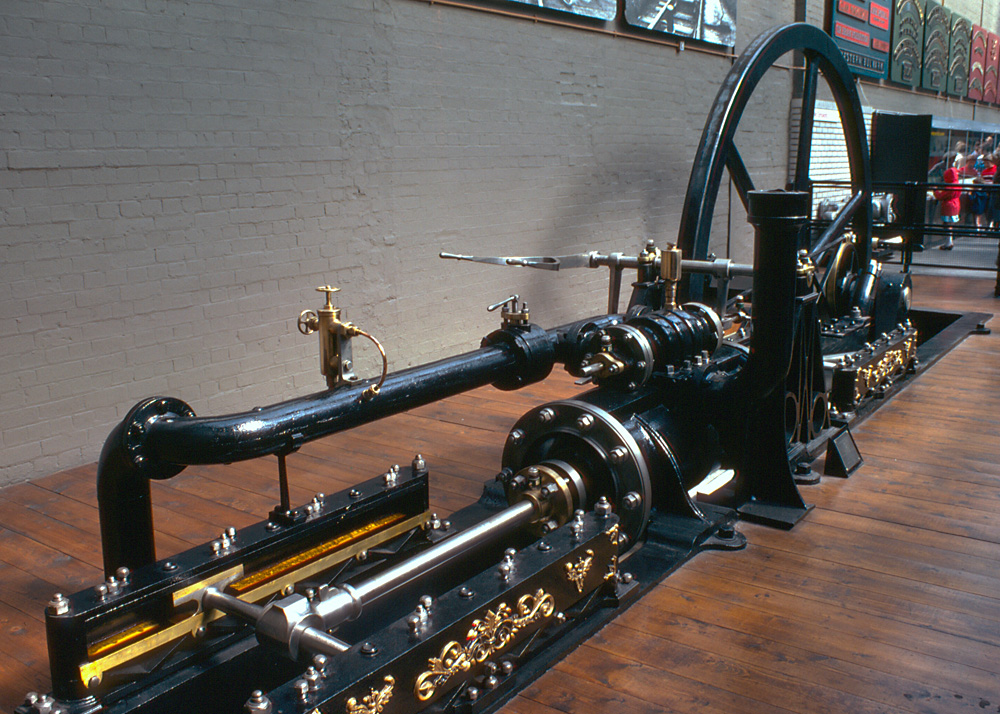
The Swannington incline winding engine preserved in the National Railway Museum, York.

In 1843 a serious accident took place on the Bagworth incline. A train of goods wagons and an empty passenger carriage was being lowered down the incline when it slipped from the incline rope, and ran at high speed down the incline and was wrecked. The company decided to discontinue the use of the incline for passenger traffic. Passengers had to disembark from their trains and walk up or down the incline to rejoin the train.

== Connecting lines ==
The L&SR did not make any branch lines itself, although from the beginning, mine and quarry owners were encouraged to make their own connecting mineral lines from their workings.

=== Groby Granite Railway ===
This branch opened on the same day as the Leicester and Swannington Railway, joining the line about halfway between Glenfield and Ratby. The junction was made by a turntable into a loop siding off the L&SR main line. The branch closed around 1843. After the L&SR had been upgraded by the Midland Railway, the Groby branch was re-opened around 1866–1870. A proper running junction with sidings was put in place. The branch ran northward for over three miles, to the Old Groby Quarry, close to the centre of Groby village. Later extensions linked to other quarries in and near Groby: the Castle Hill Quarry (after 1870), the Bunney Hill Quarry, the Sheet Hedges Wood Quarry (1890s), and the Dowry Quarry (1907 to 1916).

The wagons were hauled by a stationary engine at the summit of the hill beside the Ratby Road. The loaded wagons were pulled there from the quarries and then they ran downhill to the junction with L&SR, speed being controlled by a brakesman. Two horses were aboard for the downhill journey; they drew empty wagons back up the incline.

=== Coleorton Railway ===
Coleorton Railway Act 1833
- Act of Parliament
- Parliament of the United Kingdom
- Long title: An Act for making and maintaining a Railway from the Termination of the Leicester and Swannington Railway in the Township of Swannington in the County of Leicester to the Ashby-de-la-Zouch Railway in the Township of Worthington in the said County, and a Branch Railway therefrom.
- Citation: 3 & 4 Will. 4. c. lxxi

Dates
- Royal assent: 10 June 1833

Text of statute as originally enacted

Sir George Beaumont owned lands and colliery workings at Coleorton, to the northwest of Swannington. He had anticipated that the Leicester and Swannington Railway would be extended to Coleorton, but the L&SR directors decided not to do so. On 28 September 1832 Beaumont wrote to the company saying that he would be willing to make a line from the Coleorton colliery area to the L&SR at Peggs Green if the L&SR would meet the parliamentary costs of obtaining an authorising act of Parliament. The L&SR agreed to this arrangement and the Coleorton Railway received its authorising act of Parliament, the Coleorton Railway Act 1833 (3 & 4 Will. 4. c. lxxi), on 10 June 1833.

It opened in 1834, using horse traction. It ran from a junction with the 4 ft 2in gauge Ticknall Tramway at Worthington to the foot of the Swannington incline. Leleux states that it never made a physical connection with the L&SR. However Hartley states that by November 1833 the first loads of coal from the Coleorton Railway were being worked up the Swannington incline, though by teams of horses due to problems with the winding engine., and Clinker states that L&SR traffic returns show 138 tons of coal from the Coleorton Railway were conveyed on the L&SR in November 1833 and assumes that this used the incline. The Coleorton Railway ceased working during 1860, and part of its course was operated as a siding from the Ashby to Derby line, which opened in 1874, following a similar alignment to the Ticknall Tramway.

=== Other branches ===
Other branches were made: they were the Bagworth Colliery branch, opened in July 1832; the Ibstock Colliery branch, opened in 1832; the Long Lane (Whitwick) Colliery branch, opened in 1833; and a branch to Snibston Colliery, opened in 1833. Two further branches to Snibston were built up to 1850; they were followed later by the Nailstone Colliery branch, opened in 1866, and Ellistown Colliery Branch, opened about 1875–1876.

== Locomotives ==
=== Initial designs ===
Five locomotives were built by Robert Stephenson and Company for the line. The first was Comet, shipped from the works by sea and canal. The second engine, Phoenix, was delivered in 1832; both had four-coupled wheels. Phoenix was sold in 1835 to work in the construction of the London and Birmingham Railway. The next were Samson and Goliath, delivered in 1833. They were initially four-coupled, but were extremely unstable and a pair of trailing wheels were added. This 0-4-2 formation was also used for Hercules, the next engine to enter service. These were the first six-wheeled goods engines with inside cylinders and, after the flanges were taken off the centre pairs of wheels, were so satisfactory, that Stephenson decided never to build another four-wheeled engine.

=== 0-6-0 design ===
By 1834, traffic had increased to such an extent that more powerful engines were needed and the next to be delivered was Atlas, the first ever six-coupled inside cylinder design. These engines were more stable than their outside cylindered counterparts.

So far all the engines had been provided by Stephenson, but the directors decided to try one of Edward Bury's locomotives. An 0-4-0, Liverpool, was delivered in 1834 but it proved unequal to the loads hauled by Atlas. The next engine bought for the line was Vulcan, an 0-6-0 by Tayleur and Company. The last two were constructed by the Haigh Foundry, Ajax, 0-4-2 and Hector, 0-6-0.

=== Whistle ===
The historian Clement Stretton relates that towards the close of the year 1833 a collision took place between a train at a cart crossing the line near Thornton. The engine was “Samson”. The engine driver had a horn (Note: Presumably a hunting horn as used on stage coaches.) but could not attract the attention of the cart driver, and the engine struck it. Mr Baxter the line manager suggested the use of a steam trumpet or whistle and by Mr George Stephenson's instructions such an appliance was at once constructed by a local musical instrument maker and it worked satisfactorily.

If this is factual, it would appear to be the creation of the first steam whistle. However many factories used steam power supplied by stationary steam engines to drive mill machinery, and it seems remarkable that steam whistles had not been in use to indicate for example the start and end of the working day. Clinker is dismissive of this story for several reasons; in particular the board minutes recorded considerable detail of trivial events, yet this is not reported.

== The Midland Railway ==
=== Competition ===
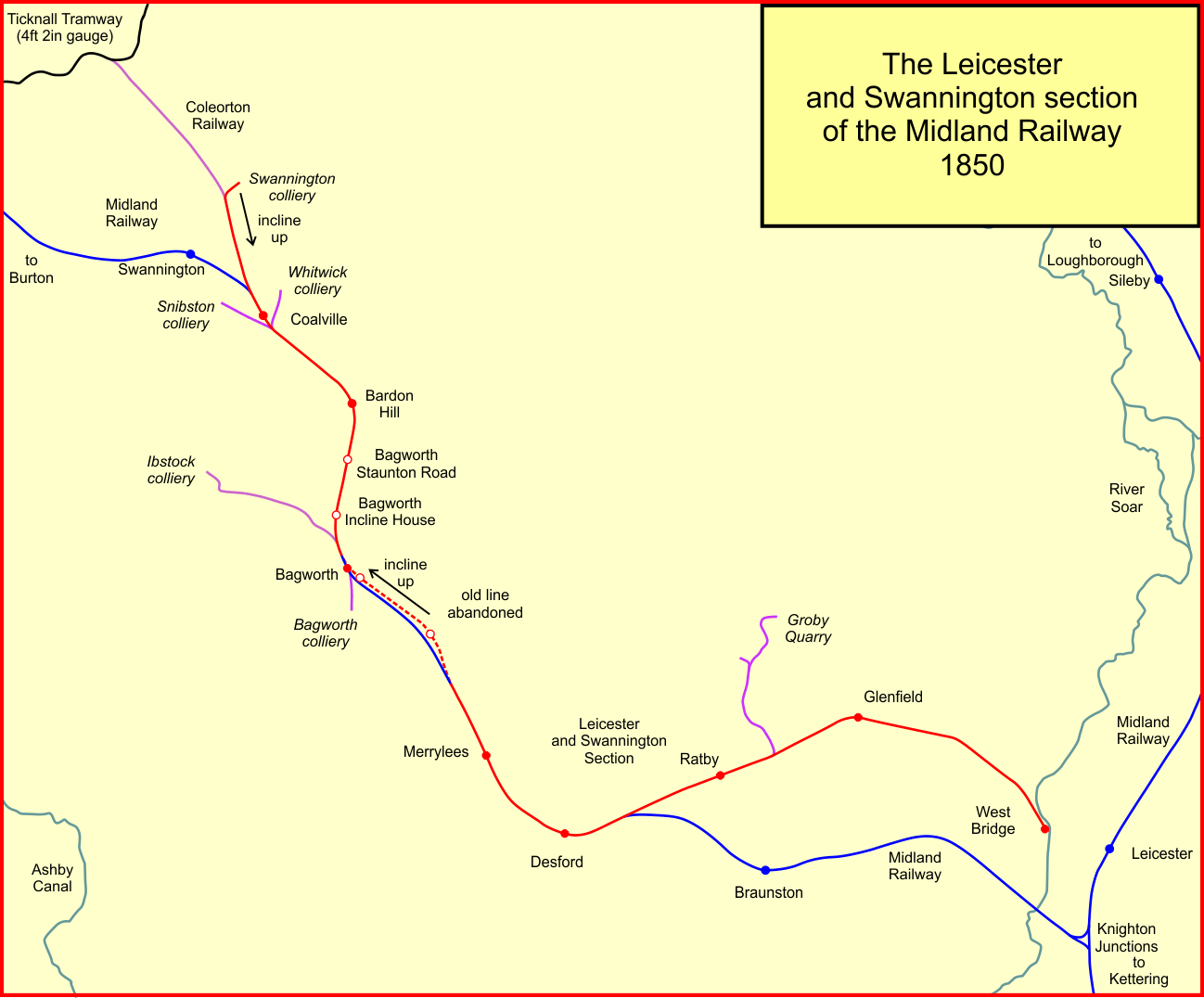
The Leicester and Swannington system in 1850

The L&SR had not faced competition for some time, but in 1835 the Midland Counties Railway was proposed, for a line from collieries in Derbyshire and Nottinghamshire to Leicester and Rugby. The Midland Counties Railway was authorised on 21 June 1836. The line opened on 4 May 1840.

The Leicester Navigation immediately suffered from the competition and lowered its rates considerably. This put the cost of coal from those regions below that for which West Leicestershire products could be sold, forcing their owners to reduce their own prices.

Midland Railway (Leicester and Swannington Railway Purchase) Act 1846
- Act of Parliament
- Parliament of the United Kingdom
- Long title: An Act for vesting the Leicester and Swannington Railway in the Midland Railway Company.
- Citation: 9 & 10 Vict. c. ccxliii

Dates
- Royal assent: 27 July 1846

The L&SR was in turmoil, looking for an alternative business, and in 1845 the Midland Railway, successor to the Midland Counties Railway, made an offer to purchase the L&SR. The motivation of the Midland Railway was partly to exclude competing railways that might take on the L&SR. The offer was excellent, and the L&SR shareholders agreed on 20 August 1845. The Midland Railway (Leicester and Swannington Railway Purchase) Act 1846 (9 & 10 Vict. c. ccxliii) ratified it as from 27 July 1846. The Midland began working the L&SR on 1 January 1847.

=== Midland Railway improvements ===
The Midland Railway had acquired 16 1/2 miles of railway, eight locomotives, six carriages, and twelve goods vehicles. (Note: Nearly all the mineral wagons were owned by the collieries.) The line was not physically connected to any other railway.

Midland Railway (Leicester and Swannington Railway Amendment) Act 1847
- Act of Parliament
- Parliament of the United Kingdom
- Long title: An Act to enable the Midland Railway Company to alter the Line of the Leicester and Swannington Railway, and to make certain Branches therefrom; and for other Purposes.
- Citation: 10 & 11 Vict. c. cxxii

Dates
- Royal assent: 2 July 1847

Text of statute as originally enacted

In July 1847 the Midland got authorisation in the Midland Railway (Leicester and Swannington Railway Amendment) Act 1847 (10 & 11 Vict. c. cxxii) to make a new railway from Leicester to Burton, incorporating part of the L&SR into the route. The L&SR was doubled between Desford Junction and Thornton, also between Bagworth and Mantle Lane, Coalville, and a new deviation line, two miles in length, was constructed, by-passing the Bagworth self-acting incline.

The old Bagworth incline was closed after cessation of traffic on 25 March and replaced on 27 March 1848 by the new double line, with a ruling gradient of 1 in 66.

It was soon discovered that the L&SR engines were inadequate to cope with the gradient, so that banking engines had to be used. Later the Midland used a more powerful "Buffalo" design, but as the L&SR system was still disconnected from the general railway network, the locomotive had to be moved through the streets of Leicester by road.

=== Leicester to Burton line ===
The Midland Railway opened its Leicester to Burton line, incorporating part of the L&SR, on 1 August 1849. It ran from a connection at Knighton Junction, a short distance south of Leicester station; in 1850 a south curve was constructed there, making it a triangular junction. The Leicester passenger terminal had always been of the most basic description, but it was not until 13 March 1893 that the Midland Railway opened a new station there, at West Bridge.

The original Leicester termination of the L&SR continued in use as the West Bridge branch until passenger services were withdrawn on 24 September 1928 and freight on 2 May 1966.

In 1969 Glenfield Tunnel, on the original, and now by-passed, L&SR route was purchased by Leicester Corporation for £5, and sealed. The present Leicester to Burton line closed to passengers on 7 September 1964.

== Locations ==
Following stagecoach practice, formal station buildings were not provided at first; the stations were merely stopping points.

- Leicester opened 18 July 1832; West Bridge soon added to name; replaced 13 March 1893 by station known locally as King Richard's Road; closed 24 September 1928;
- Glenfield; opened 18 July 1832; resited east of level crossing 1875; closed 24 September 1928;
- Ratby Lane; opened 18 July 1832; renamed Ratby by 26 April 1833; resited west of level crossing 1873; closed 24 September 1928;
- Desford Junction; convergence of Midland Railway new line;
- Desford Lane; opened 18 July 1832; renamed Desford by 26 April 1833; resited about 150 yards west 27 March 1848; closed 7 September 1964;
- Merry Lees; opened 18 July 1832; soon renamed Merrylees; resited 150 yards west of road overbridge 27 March 1848; closed 1 March 1871;
- Stag & Castle; opened 18 July 1832; renamed Thornton 1841; closed 1 January 1842;
- Thornton Lane; opened 1850; on deviation line; closed 1 October 1865;
- Bagworth; opened 18 July 1832; closed 27 March 1848 when new station on deviation opened;
- Bagworth; opened on deviation line 27 March 1848; renamed Bagworth & Ellistown 1 October 1894; closed 7 September 1964;
- Bagworth Incline House 'stopping place'; 3/4 mile beyond Bagworth; opened 18 July 1832; probably soon closed;
- Bagworth Staunton Road; original terminus of service opened 18 July 1832; ceased to be a calling point when line extended, 27 April 1833;
- Ashby Road; opened 22 February 1833; limited service; opened fully 27 April 1833; renamed Bardon Hill 1 January 1847; closed 1 March 1849; reopened 1 September 1849; closed 12 May 1952;
- Long Lane; opened 27 April 1833; renamed Coalville 1848; renamed Coalville Town 2 June 1924; closed 7 September 1964;
- Mantle Lane Junction; divergence of Midland Railway line to Burton;
- Swannington.

== Remains ==
Some remains of the Leicester and Swannington Railway are visible and can be visited.

- Much of the land at the Leicester terminus of the railway at West Bridge has been converted into a park called The Rally.
- A distance along the track bed north-west from West Bridge has been paved to provide a footpath and is also part of National Cycle Network route 63.
- Though some ventilation shafts of Glenfield tunnel are situated in private gardens some are visible by the side of public roads. Most are grade II listed buildings.
- After the closure of the West Bridge branch, Leicester City Council acquired Glenfield tunnel which required strengthening in places. The tunnel itself underwent a retrofit in 2008 to install strengthening rings that are hoped to prevent a collapse of the extant tunnel shaft. The £500,000 reinforcement project was commissioned by the Leicester city council and was recorded by the Ironbridge Gorge Museum Trust and photographed by the Leicestershire Industrial History Society. Occasional "open days" are held for organised groups. The western portal of Glenfield tunnel can be viewed from a public footpath in Glenfield, SK544066. The portal, which is a grade II listed building, has been secured.
- Most of the track bed from Station Road, Glenfield SK543065, to Station Road, Ratby SK518054, has been paved to provide a public footpath and is also part of National Cycle Network route.
- The incline at Bagworth, now bypassed by a deviation line, is a public footpath, SK444091 at top to SK453086 near bottom, though its profile has been affected by mining subsidence. Near the top was the bow-fronted incline-keeper's house, SK446091, see photograph near the top of this page, and the demolition remains of the building were visible in 2023.
- At Coalville the original building for passengers to buy tickets is now a children's nursery beside the level crossing, SK426142, and is a Grade II Listed Building.
- The incline at Swannington is under the supervision of the Swannington Heritage Trust and the track bed down the incline has been opened as a permissive path with information boards. The foundations of the engine house at the top of the incline, SK420156, have been uncovered and about 75 yards (69 m) of track have been re-laid. The historic winding engine, see photograph above, was removed from here after the incline closed to the National Railway Museum at York.
- The railway lift bridge based on an 1834 design by Robert Stephenson which was over the Grand Union canal in Leicester has been reconstructed using a number of original components at the Mountsorrel and Rothley Community Heritage Centre and formally opened in April 2026.
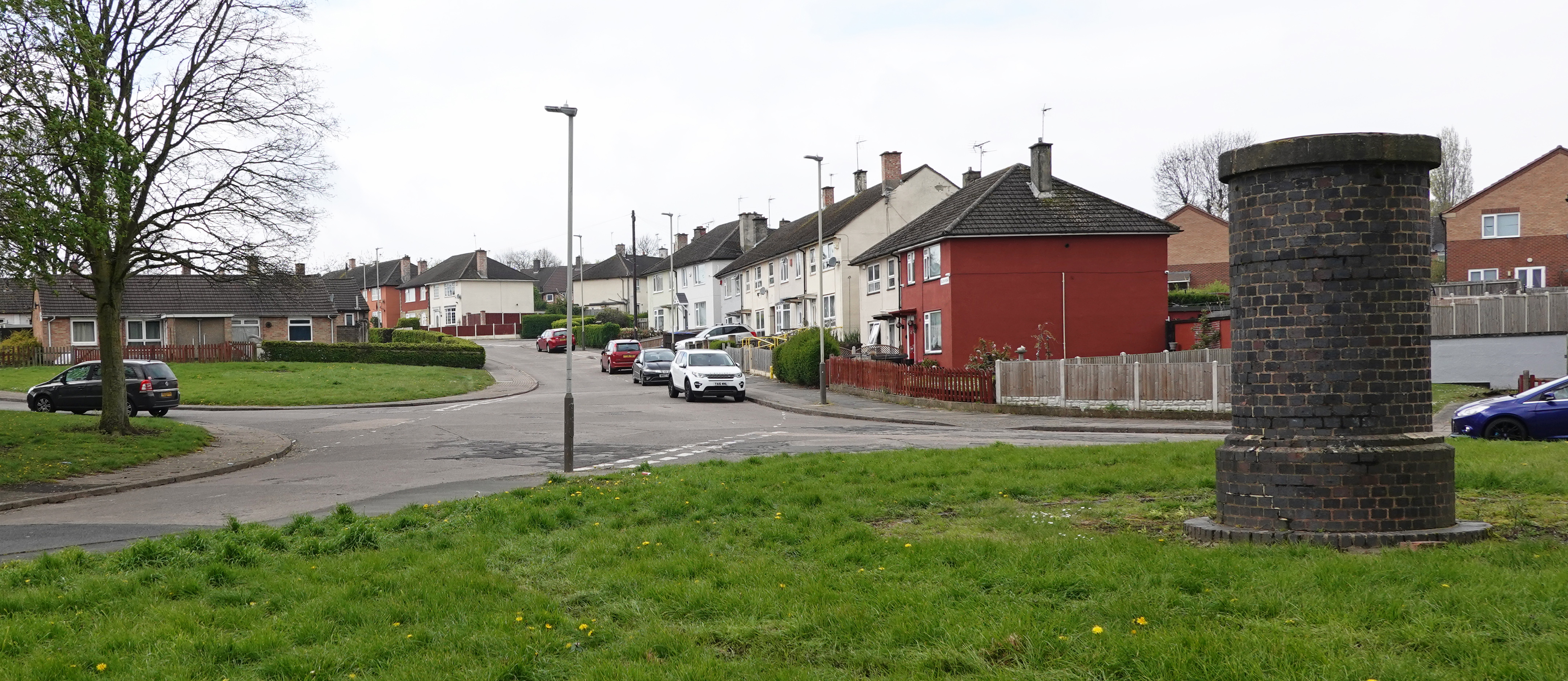
Small ventilation shaft of Glenfield Tunnel built by the Leicester & Swannington Rly, by the side of Stenson Road, Leicester, in April 2023.

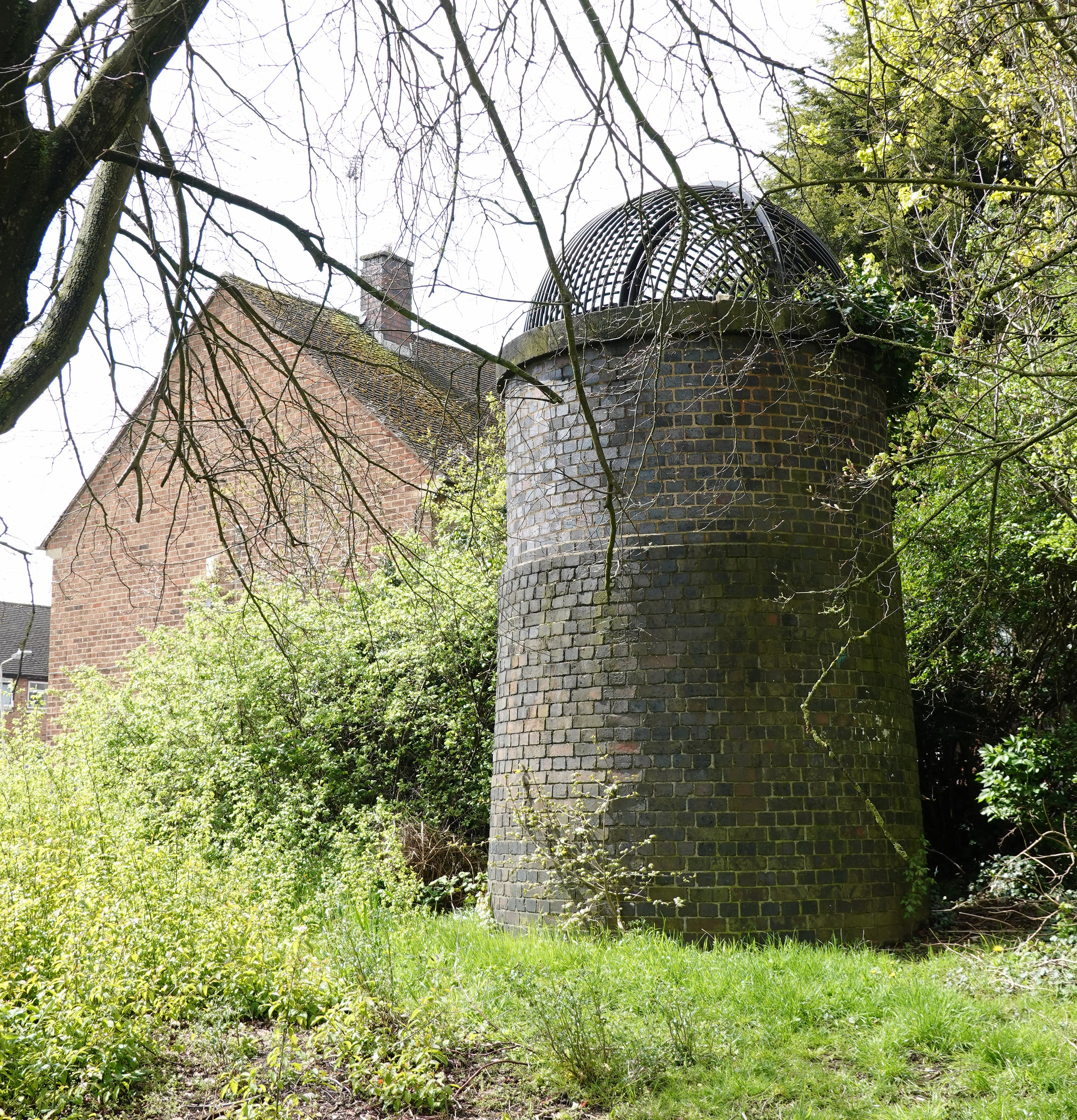
Large ventilation shaft of Glenfield Tunnel built by the Leicester and Swannington Railway, by the side of New Parks Way, Leicester, in April 2023.

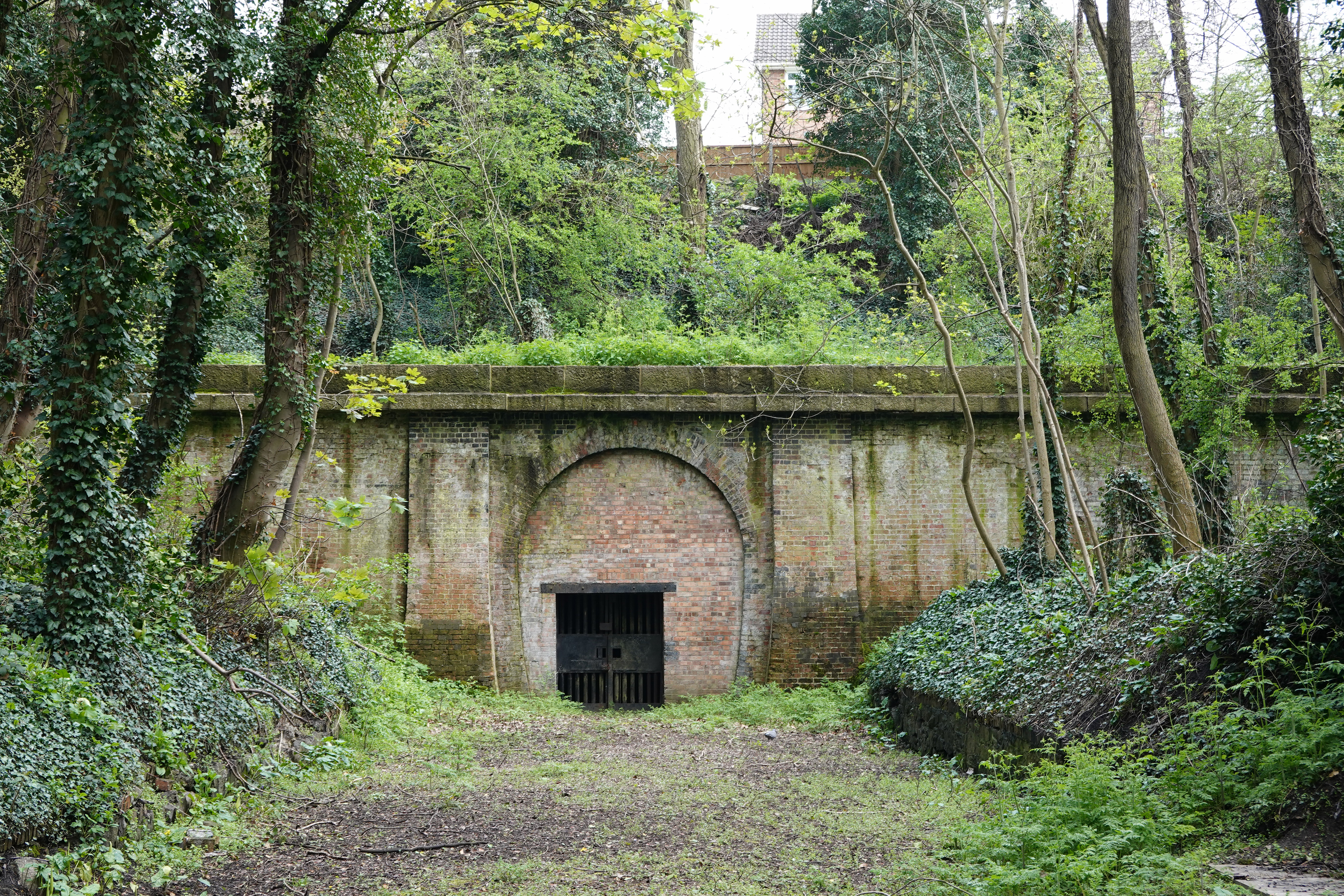
The secured west portal of the Leicester & Swannington Railway's Glenfield Tunnel, in April 2023.

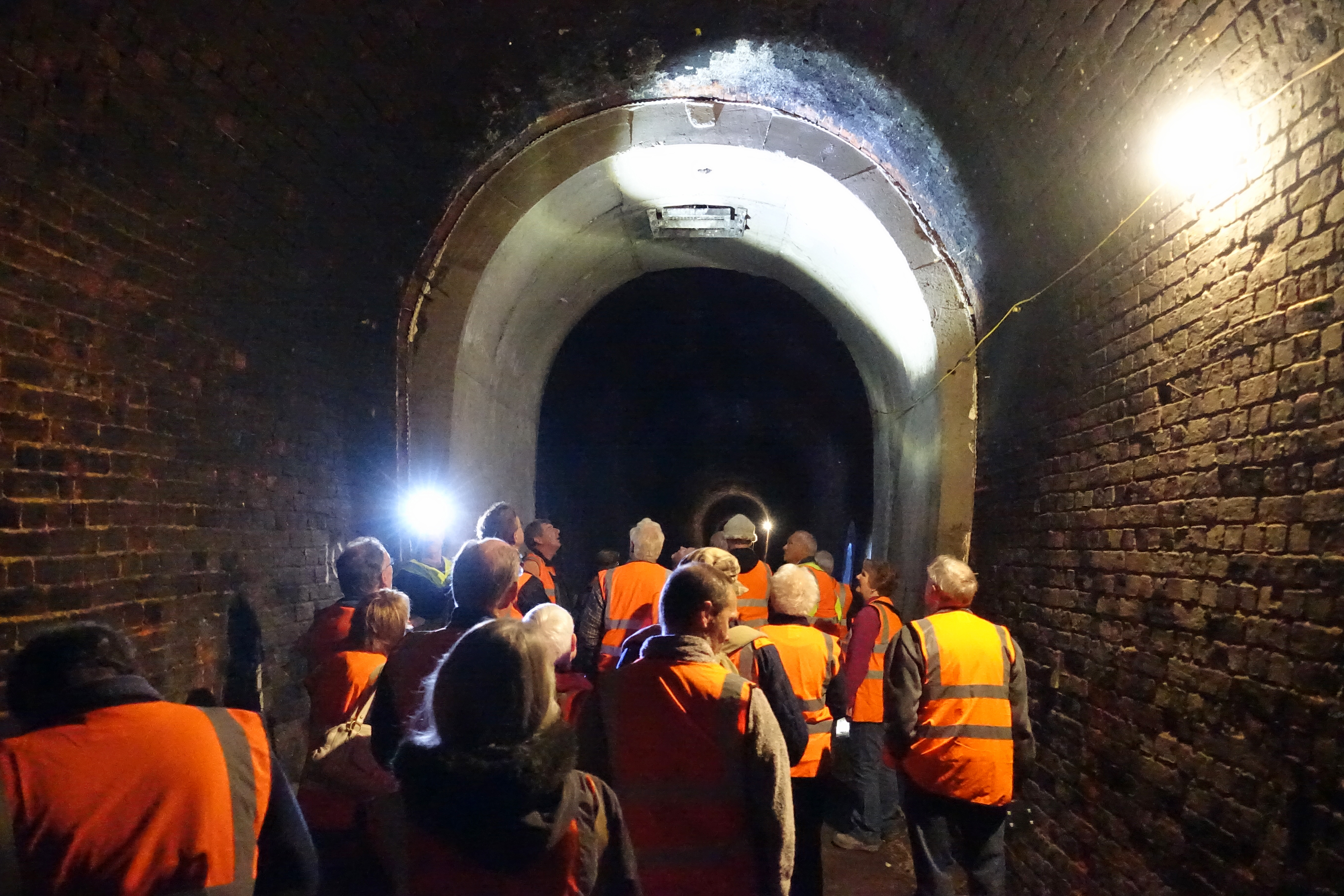
A guided tour of the Leicester & Swannington Railway's Glenfield Tunnel, organised by the Leicestershire Industrial History Society.

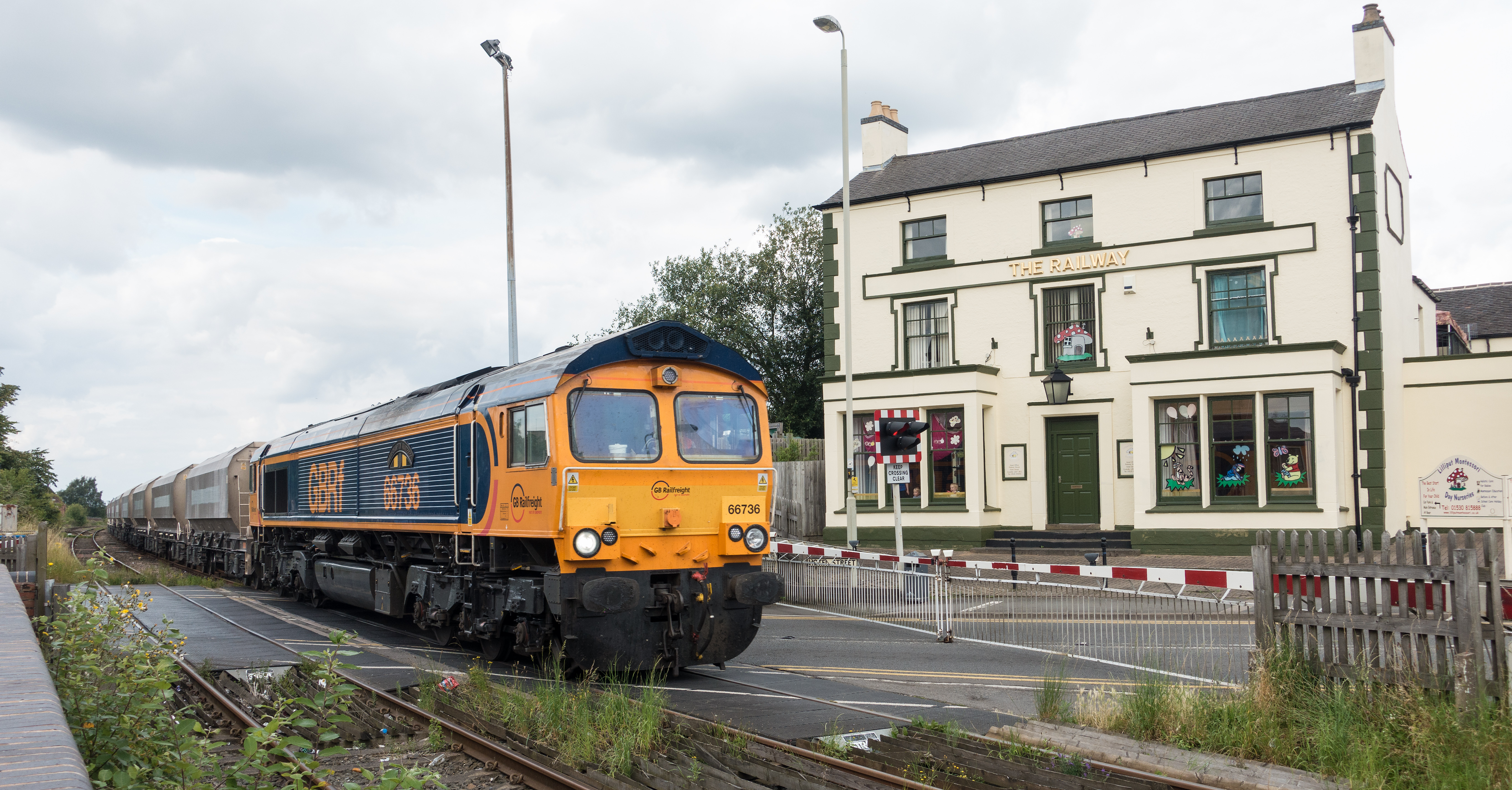
Freight train at level crossing in centre of Coalville, July 2016. The building in the background was where passengers could buy tickets for the trains until the Midland Railway opened a proper station just beyond in 1848.

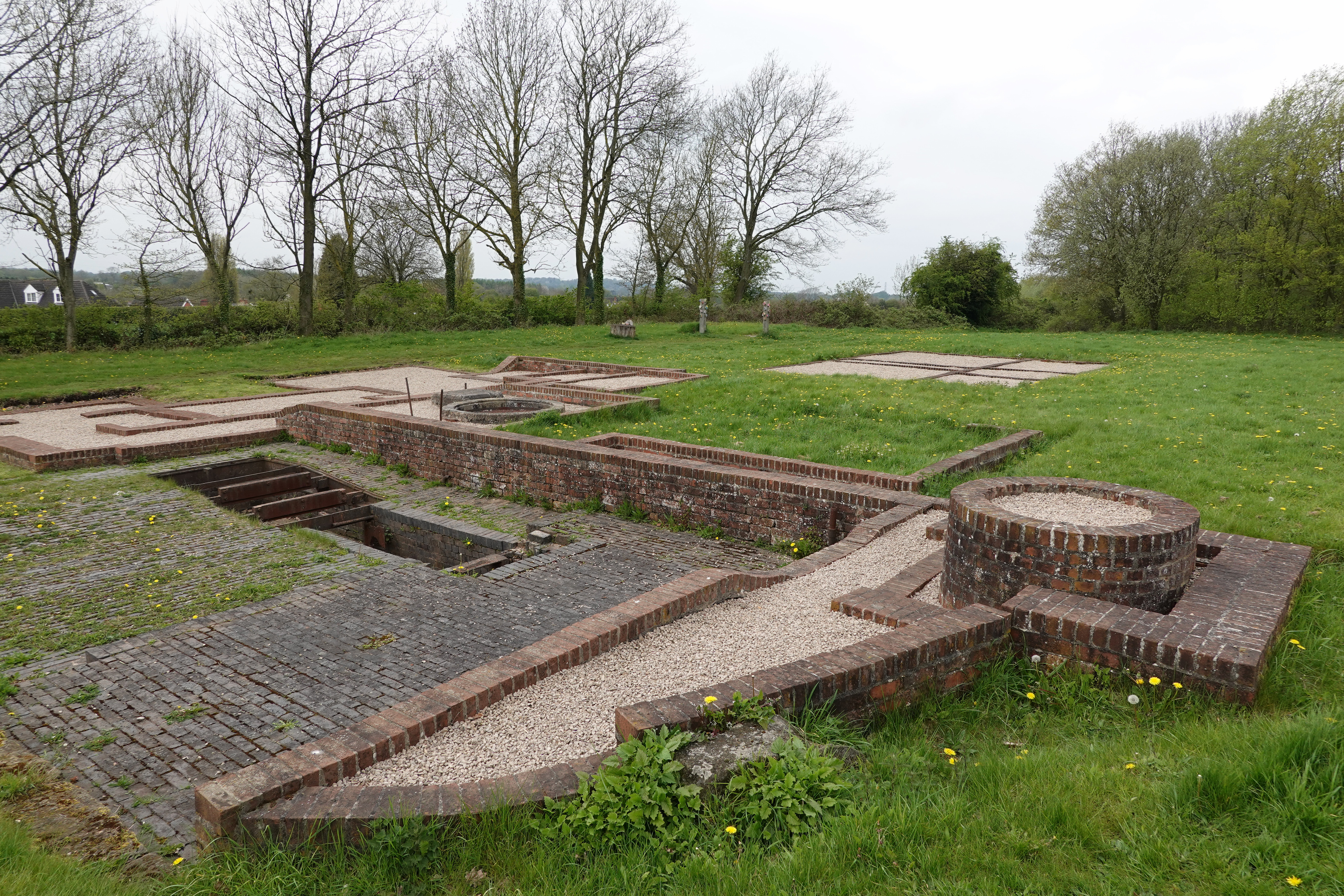
The foundations of the Leicester & Swannington's engine house at the top of Swannington Incline, in April 2023.

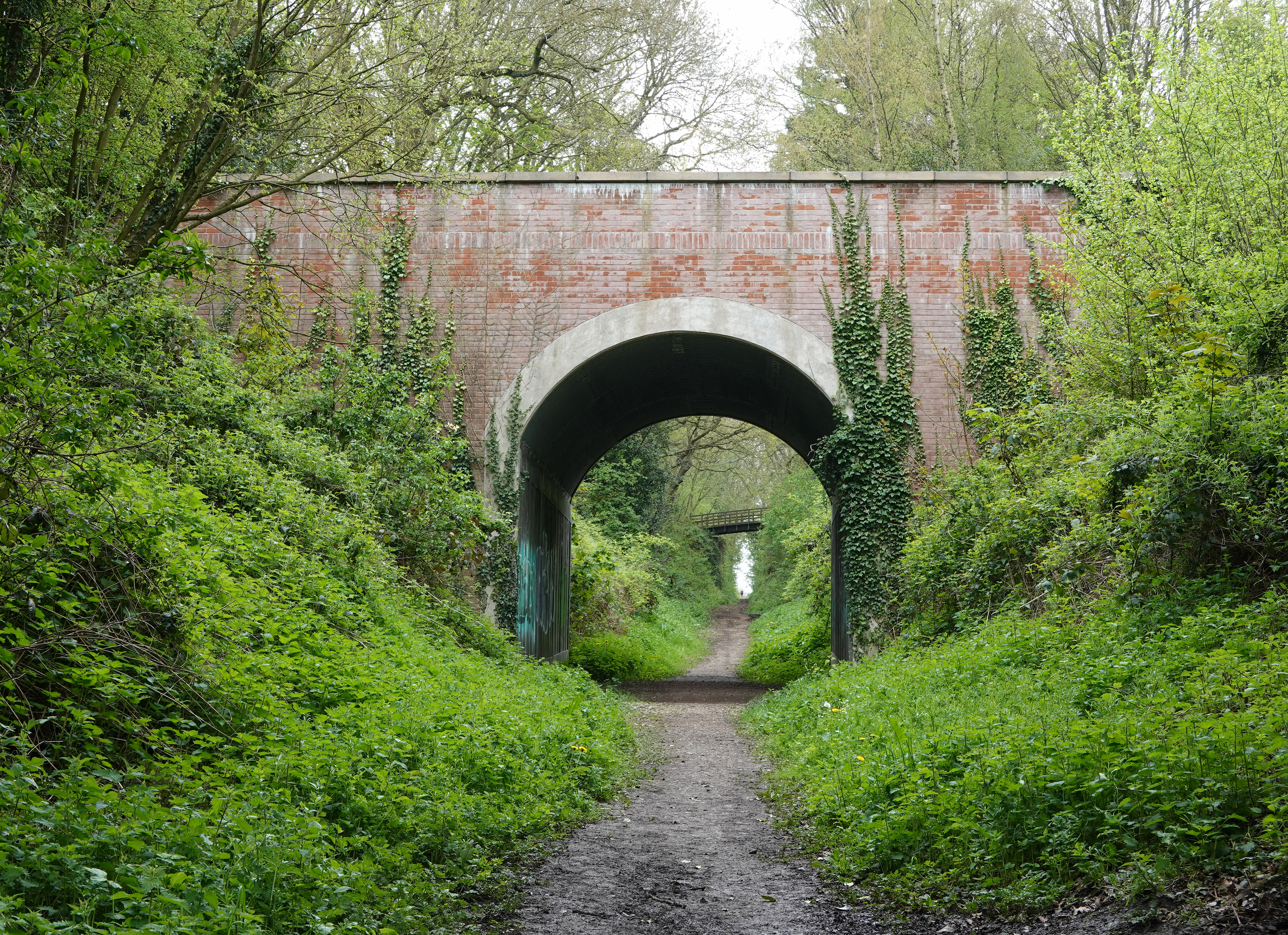
Looking up the abandoned Swannington Incline of the Leicester & Swannington Railway, in April 2023.

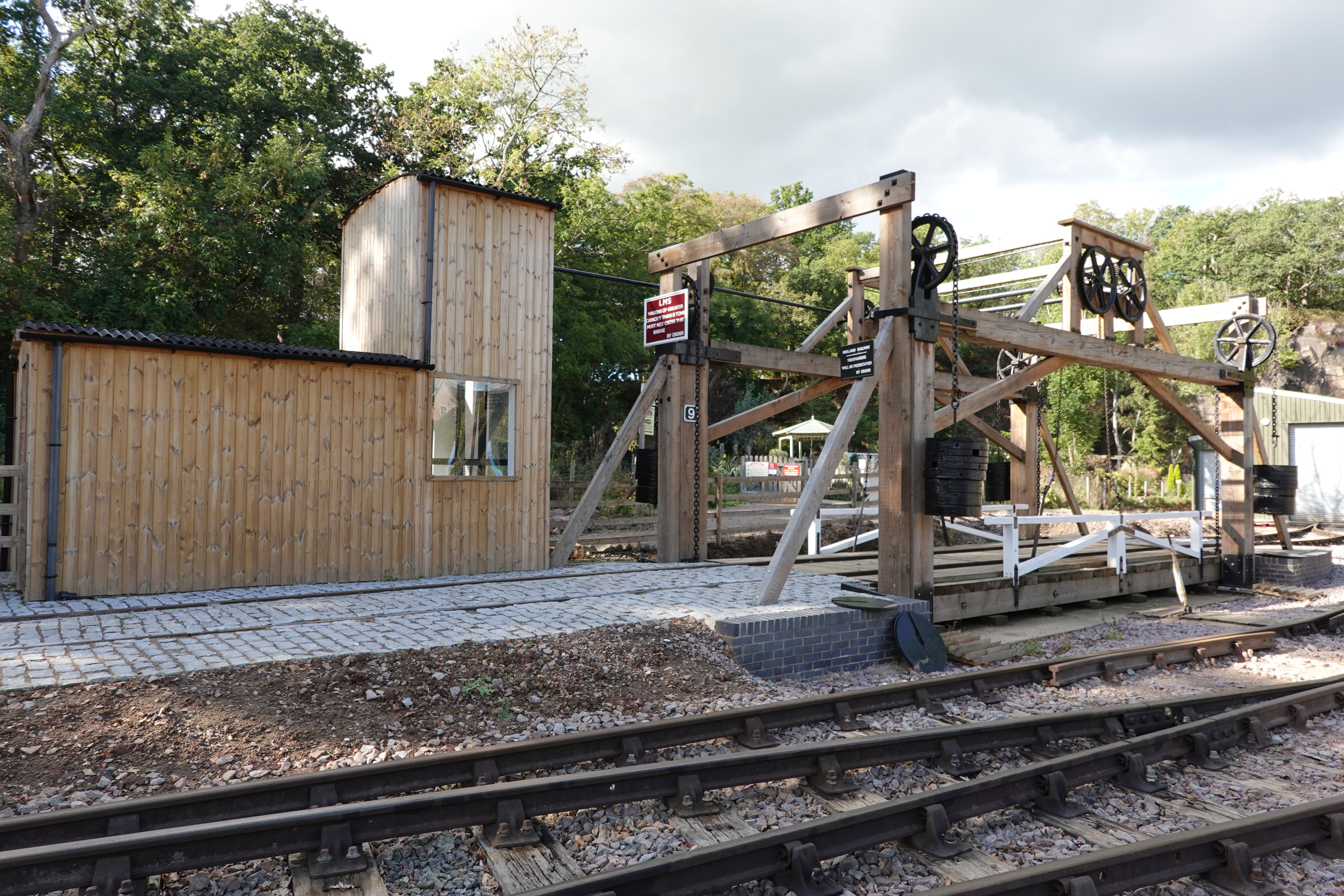
Stephenson railway lift bridge reconstructed at the Mountsorrel and Rothley Community Heritage Centre
